= Victoria and Albert Museum =

Art museum in London, England

- Logo introduced in 1989

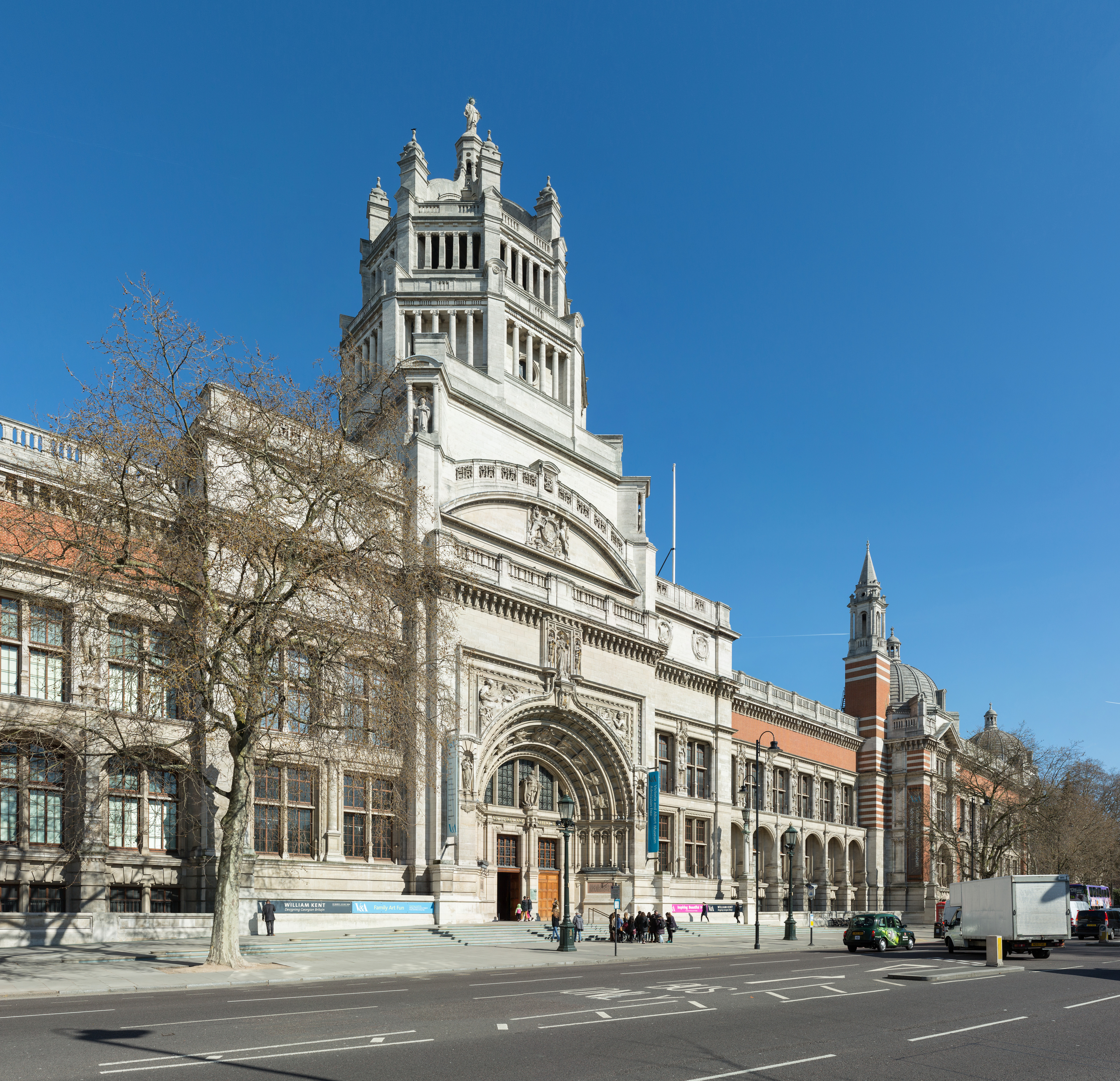
- The museum's main Cromwell Road entrance
- Former names: Museum of Manufactures; South Kensington Museum
- Established: 1852; 174 years ago
- Location: Cromwell Road, Kensington and Chelsea, London, SW7
- Coordinates: 51°29′48″N 00°10′19″W
- Type: Art museum
- Collection size: approx. 2.8 million objects; 145 galleries
- Visitors: 3,332,300 in 2025
- Director: Tristram Hunt
- Architects: Francis Fowke; Henry Young Darracott Scott; J. W. Wild; Aston Webb; Amanda Levete; et al.
- Owner: Non-departmental public body of the Department for Culture, Media and Sport
- Public transit access: South Kensington; Kensington Museums 360; Victoria & Albert Museum 14, 74, C1
- Website: vam.ac.uk

The Victoria and Albert Museum (abbreviated V&A) in the United Kingdom is the world's largest museum of applied arts, decorative arts and design, housing a permanent collection of over 2.8 million objects. The Victoria and Albert Museum collection is housed across six sites in the United Kingdom. This "family of museums" comprises;-

- V&A South Kensington, the museum's original London site which covers 12.5 acres (5.1 ha) in the Royal Borough of Kensington and Chelsea in London and has over 145 galleries.
- Young V&A, opened as the V&A Bethnal Green Museum in 1872, became the Museum of Childhood in 1974 and then the Young V&A in 2023.
- V&A Dundee, opened in September 2018
- V&A Wedgwood Collection, the former Wedgwood Museum in Barlaston, Stoke-on-Trent acquired in 2014
- V&A East Storehouse, opened in June 2025
- V&A East Museum, opened in April 2026.

The sites share a common website which also hosts the "Order an Object" service allowing members of the public to view individual objects at V&A East Storehouse or at South Kensington.

The museum collection spans 5,000 years, from ancient history to the present day, and includes works from Europe, the Americas, Africa and Asia plus art from South Asia, China, Japan, Korea and the Islamic world. The East Asian collections are particularly strong in ceramics and metalwork, while the Islamic collection is amongst the largest in the Western world. The museum also holds one of the largest collections of post-classical sculpture in the world. Its collection of Italian Renaissance sculpture being the largest outside Italy, however, the art of antiquity in most areas is not the V&A's focus. The holdings of ceramics, glass, textiles, costumes, jewellery, silver, metalwork, furniture, medieval objects, sculpture, prints, drawings and photographs are also among the largest and most comprehensive in the world.

The museum can trace its origins to the Government School of Design, established in 1832, and until 1983, the museum remained directly controlled by a government department, initially the Board of Education and eventually the Department of Education and Science. It is now a non-departmental public body sponsored by the Department for Culture, Media and Sport. As with other national British museums, entrance is free.

== History ==
=== Origins ===
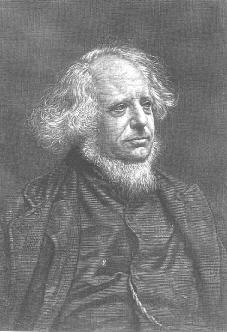
Sir Henry Cole, the museum's first director

The Victoria and Albert Museum has its origins in the Government School of Design, established by the British Government in 1832 at Somerset House in London for "the direct application of the Arts to Manufactures". The School of Design was created because the government feared that the poor quality of art education in Britain was restricting the growth and export potential of British industry. The school included a museum which, alongside contemporary artworks, held plaster casts of ancient sculptures and of features from classical buildings to use as teaching aides. At the French Industrial Exposition of 1844 in Paris, £1400 was spent on items for the museum.

In January 1852, Henry Cole was appointed head of the Government School of Design and announced his intention to transform it into an institution that would "elevate the Art Education of the whole people, and not merely ... teach the artisans, who are servants of the manufacturers." Prince Albert, who had worked with Cole on the Great Exhibition, supported this approach and offered the use of a royal mansion, Marlborough House on The Mall, for this new Museum of Manufactures, which would include the Design School.

With a parliamentary grant of £5000, Cole purchased several exhibits from the Great Exhibition of 1851 for the museum's collection. These included a large number of textiles from India and several works by Augustus Pugin. In 1853 the museum attracted 125,000 visitors and was re-named the Museum of Ornamental Art.

=== Move to South Kensington ===
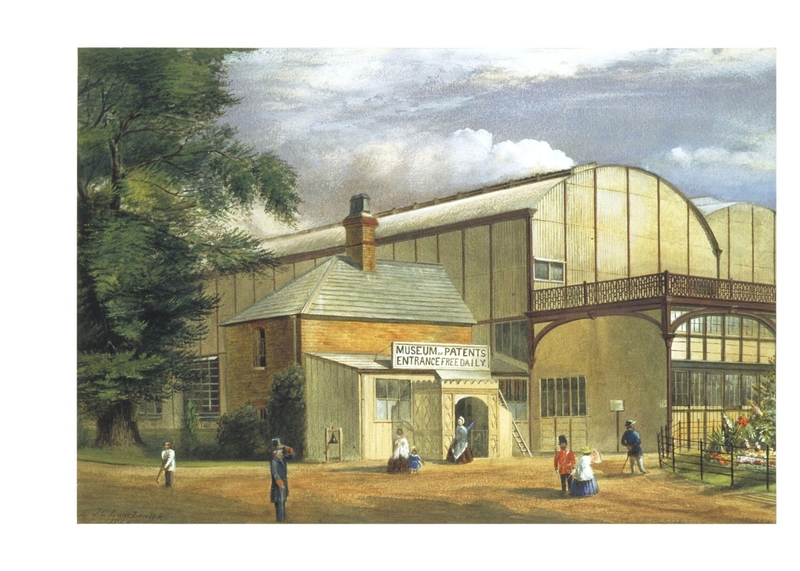
South Kensington Museum, a watercolour painting by J.C. Lanchenick

By February 1854, discussions were underway to transfer the museum to Brompton on the edge of central London. There, as a legacy of the Great Exhibition, Prince Albert was planning a group of institutions for the improvement of industry by the study and application of the arts and sciences. Dubbed "Albertopolis" by the British press, the project included what eventually became the Natural History Museum, the Science Museum and Imperial College London. Given the run-down nature of Brompton, Cole persuaded the authorities to rename the area South Kensington to make it more attractive to potential visitors. In 1855, the German architect Gottfried Semper produced a design for the South Kensington site, but it was rejected as too expensive. In 1857 the museum, which included scientific displays, did move to South Kensington where, at the suggestion of Prince Albert, it was re-named the South Kensington Museum.

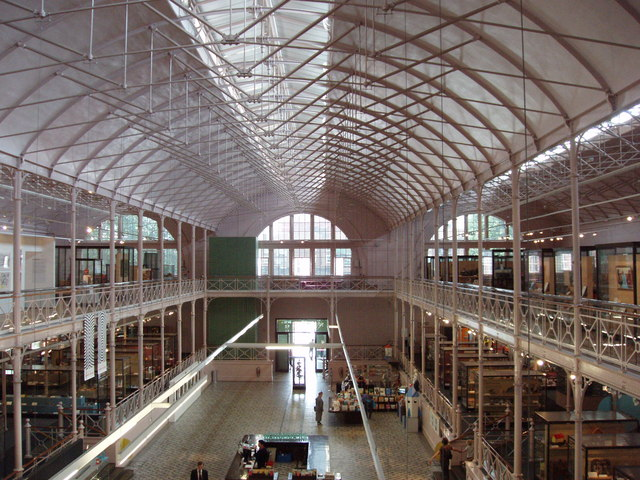
Interior of the Young V&A, with iron work from the Brompton Boilers

The South Kensington site was then occupied by a large, dilapidated property, Brompton Park House. In 1856, that building was extended by the "Brompton Boilers". These starkly utilitarian iron galleries were described as "hideously ugly" by The Builder magazine but did include a refreshment room, making the museum the first in the world to provide a catering service for visitors. The "Brompton Boilers" were dismantled in 1867 and their structural iron-work reassembled in East London to build the museum's Bethnal Green branch. The Bethnal Green branch, which is now the Young V&A, then housed the museum's collection of shoes, boots, animal products, butterflies and moths.

The first building to be erected that still forms part of the South Kensington site was the gallery built to house the art collection donated by John Sheepshanks. Built in 1857 on the eastern side of the central garden of Brompton Park House, its architect was the civil engineer Captain Francis Fowke.

John Charles Robinson became curator of the museum in 1853 and in his ten years in the role made annual trips to France, Italy and Spain. He purchased treasures that had become available on the art market due to social upheaval, revolutions or the disestablishment of religious institutions. In this way the museum virtually cornered the European market in medieval sculpture and assembled the greatest collection of Italian Renaissance sculpture anywhere outside of Italy plus significant collections of ivory and ceramics.

=== Official opening ===
The museum's official opening by Queen Victoria was on 20 June 1857. In these early years the practical use of the collection was very much emphasised as opposed to that of "High Art" at the National Gallery and of scholarship at the British Museum. George Wallis (1811–1891), the first Keeper of Fine Art Collection, passionately promoted the idea of public art education through the museum collections. This led to the original School of Design component of the museum becoming part of the National Art Training School, which would eventually become the Royal College of Art. As such, for the first fifty years of its existence, the museum was an integral part of Britain's national system of art education.

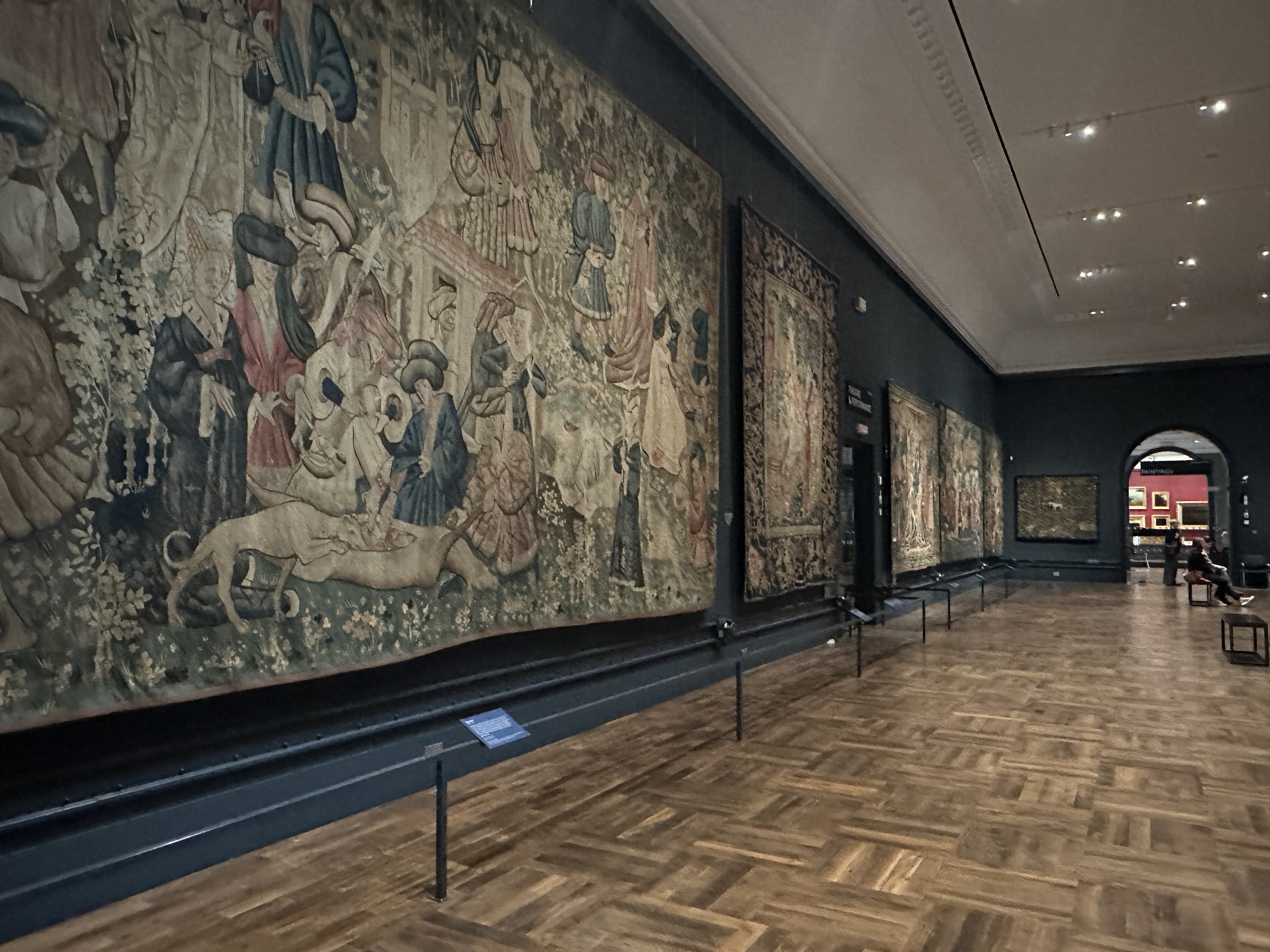
Tapestry Gallery

During 1858–1859, Fowke designed the rooms that are now form the tapestry and picture galleries. Gas lighting allowed late-night opening to be introduced in 1858 as Cole believed that this would help "to ascertain practically what hours are most convenient to the working classes". Displaying both collections of applied art and science, the museum aimed to provide educational resources and thus boost productivity in industry. Throughout the 1860s to the 1880s the scientific collections was moved from the main building to various improvised galleries west of Exhibition Road. In 1893 the "Science Museum" began to come into existence when a separate director was appointed for the scientific collections.

=== Expansion in 1860s ===
By June 1862, the North and South Courts, directly behind the Sheepshanks Gallery, were opened and remain in use today to host temporary exhibitions. An ambitious decoration scheme was developed for these areas. Between 1862 and 1871, for the upper level of the South Court, a series of thirty-five, over life-size mosaic figures depicting famous European artists was created. Known as the 'Kensington Valhalla', these have now been either moved to other areas of the museum, lost or put in storage.

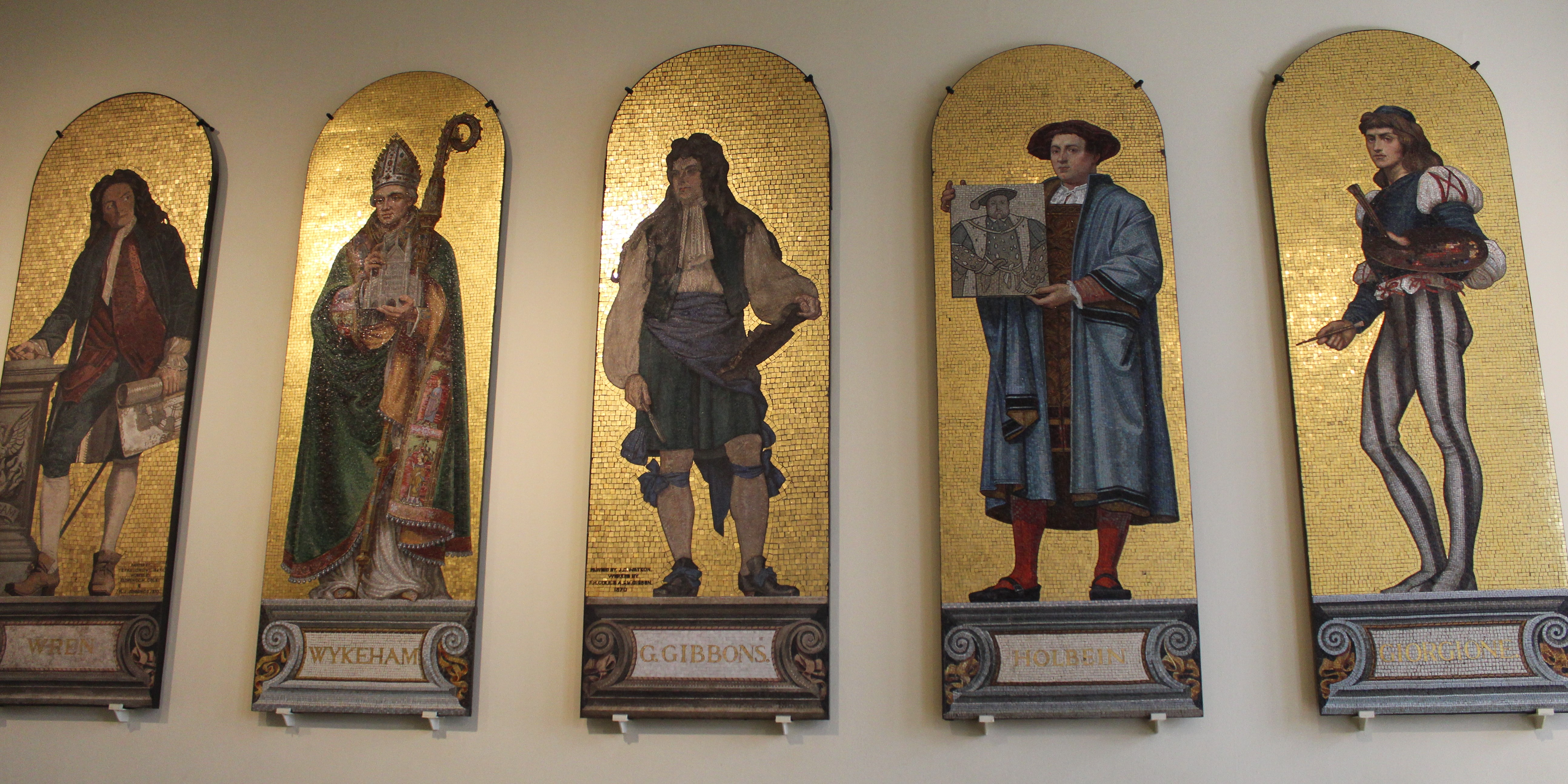
Five mosaic panels from the Kensington Valhalla

Also overlooking the South Court were two large semi-circular frescoes, the Leighton Frescoes. Commissioned by Cole with subjects previously suggested by the late Prince Albert and designed by Lord Leighton they were titled Industrial Arts as Applied to War and Industrial Arts Applied to Peace. To the east of these were additional galleries, the Oriental Courts, decorated by the architect Owen Jones. Completed in 1863, none of his decoration remains.

The Secretariat Wing was built in 1862 on the southeast side of the site. It now houses the museum's executive offices and boardroom and is not open to the public.

The last works designed by Fowke were the buildings on the north and west sides of the garden. The building west of the garden, completed in 1863, included the staff residences. The building on the north side of the garden included three new refreshment rooms, the ceramics gallery (now the silver gallery), access to the science and art schools and a lecture theatre on the top floor. The Ceramic Staircase, completed in 1871, in the northwest corner of these buildings was designed by F.W. Moody and has architectural details of moulded and coloured ceramics, many made using innovative techniques by Minton, Hollins & Co. For many years, the façade of this buildings was the main entrance to the museum. Its bronze doors, designed by James Gamble and Reuben Townroe, have six panels depicting individual scientists and artists and now lead into the cafe. Godfrey Sykes designed the mosaic in the pediment of the North Façade commemorating the Great Exhibition. The mosaic is flanked by terracotta statue groups by Percival Ball. This building replaced Brompton Park House, which was then demolished.

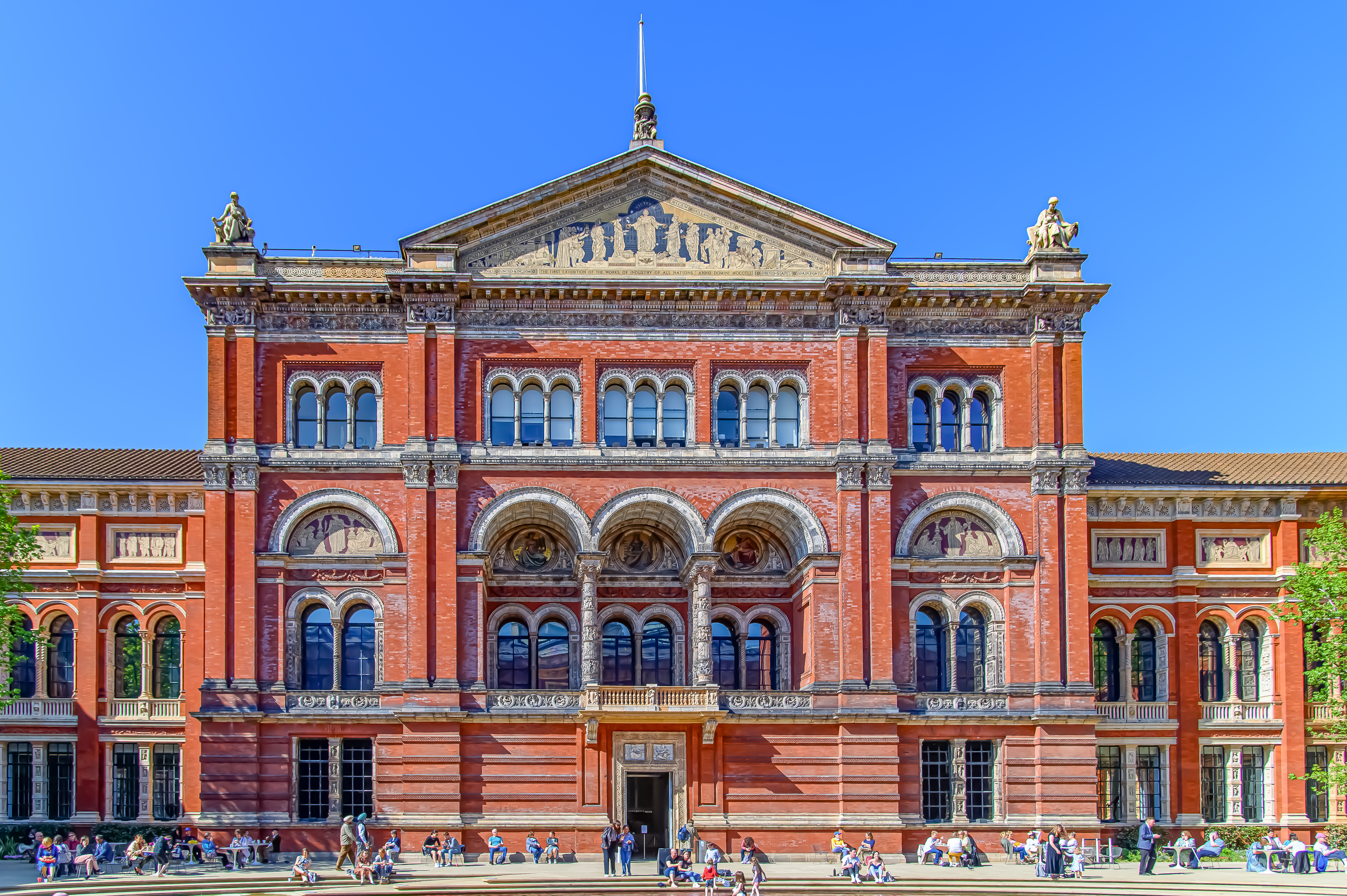
North side of garden

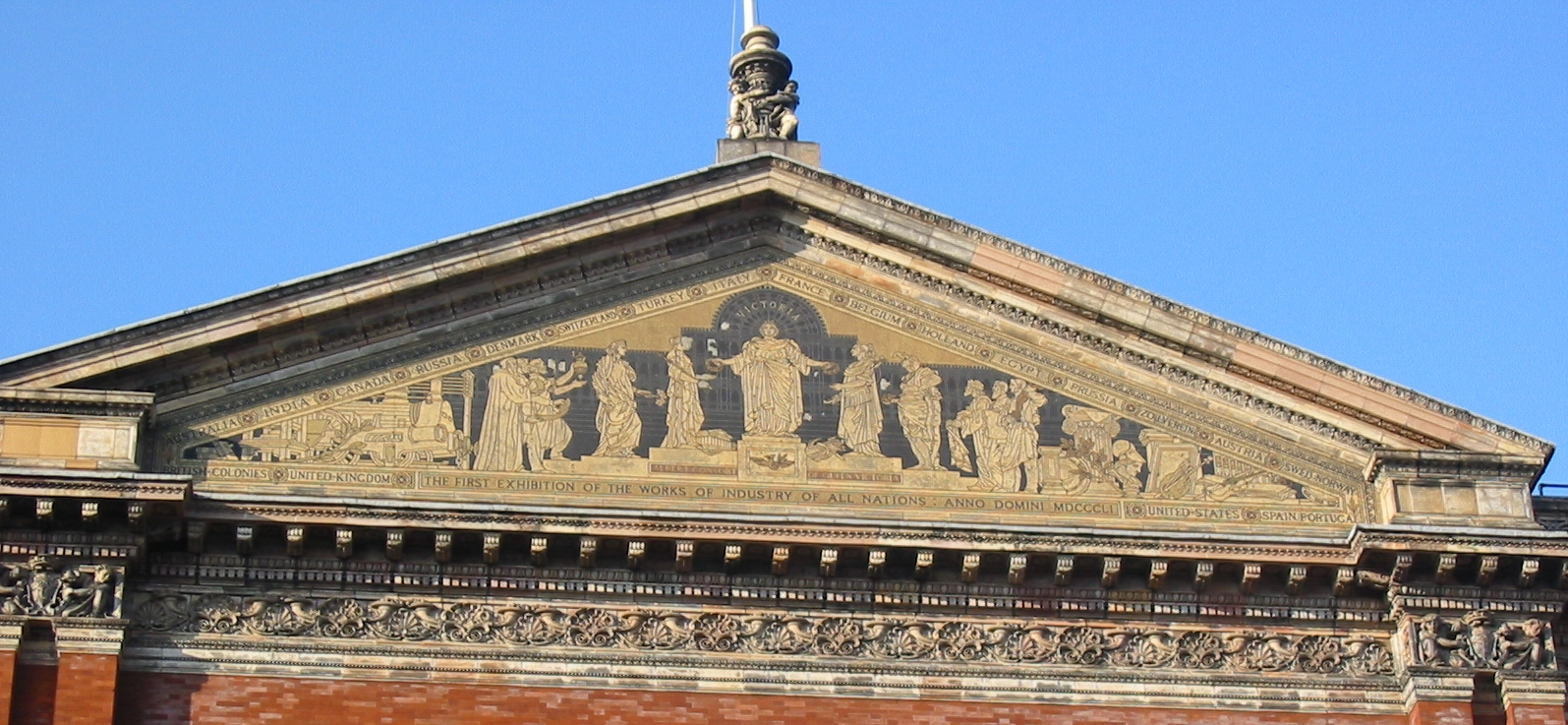
Pediment on the north side of the garden

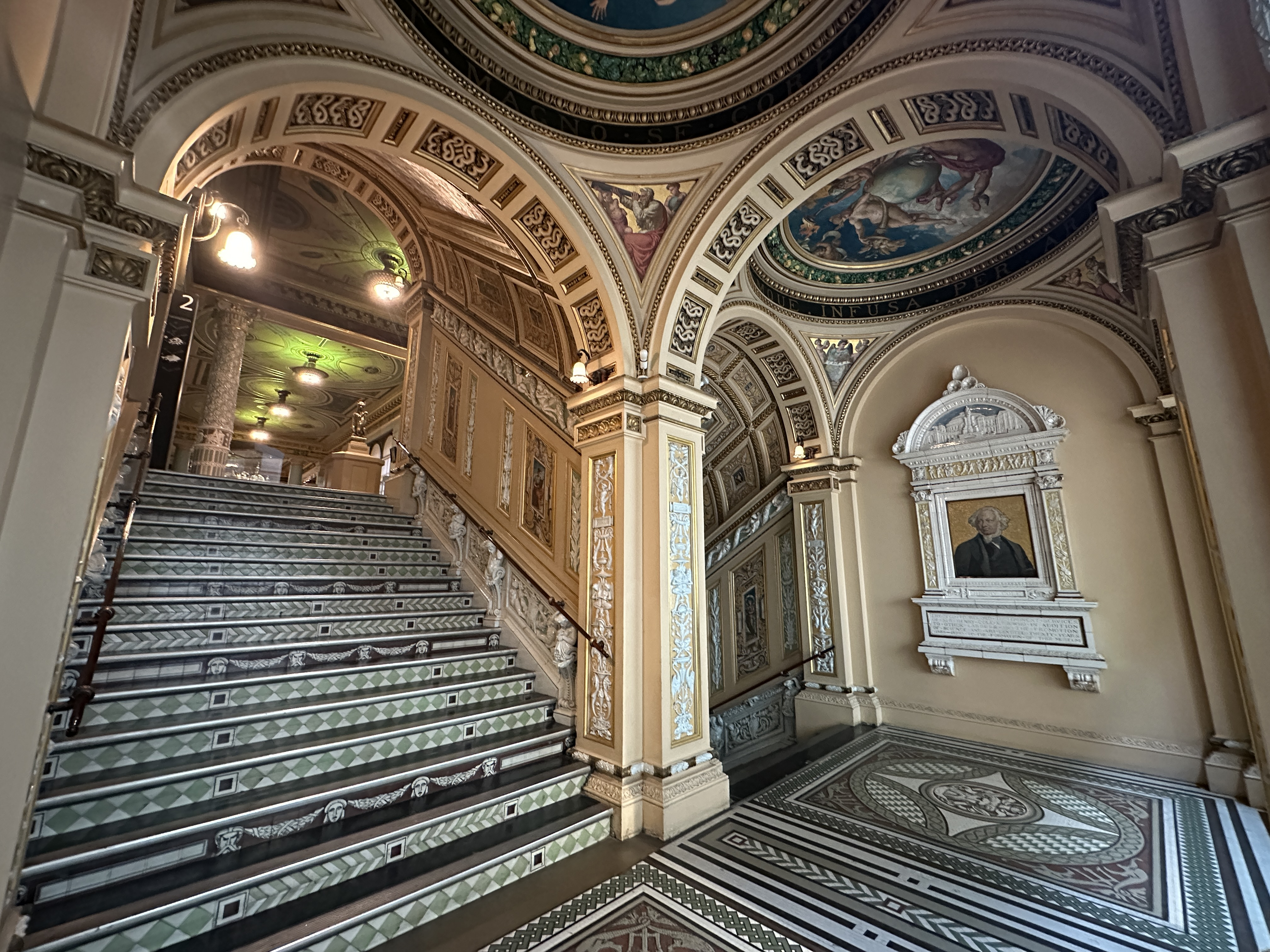
The Ceramic Staircase

=== Henry Cole Wing opens ===
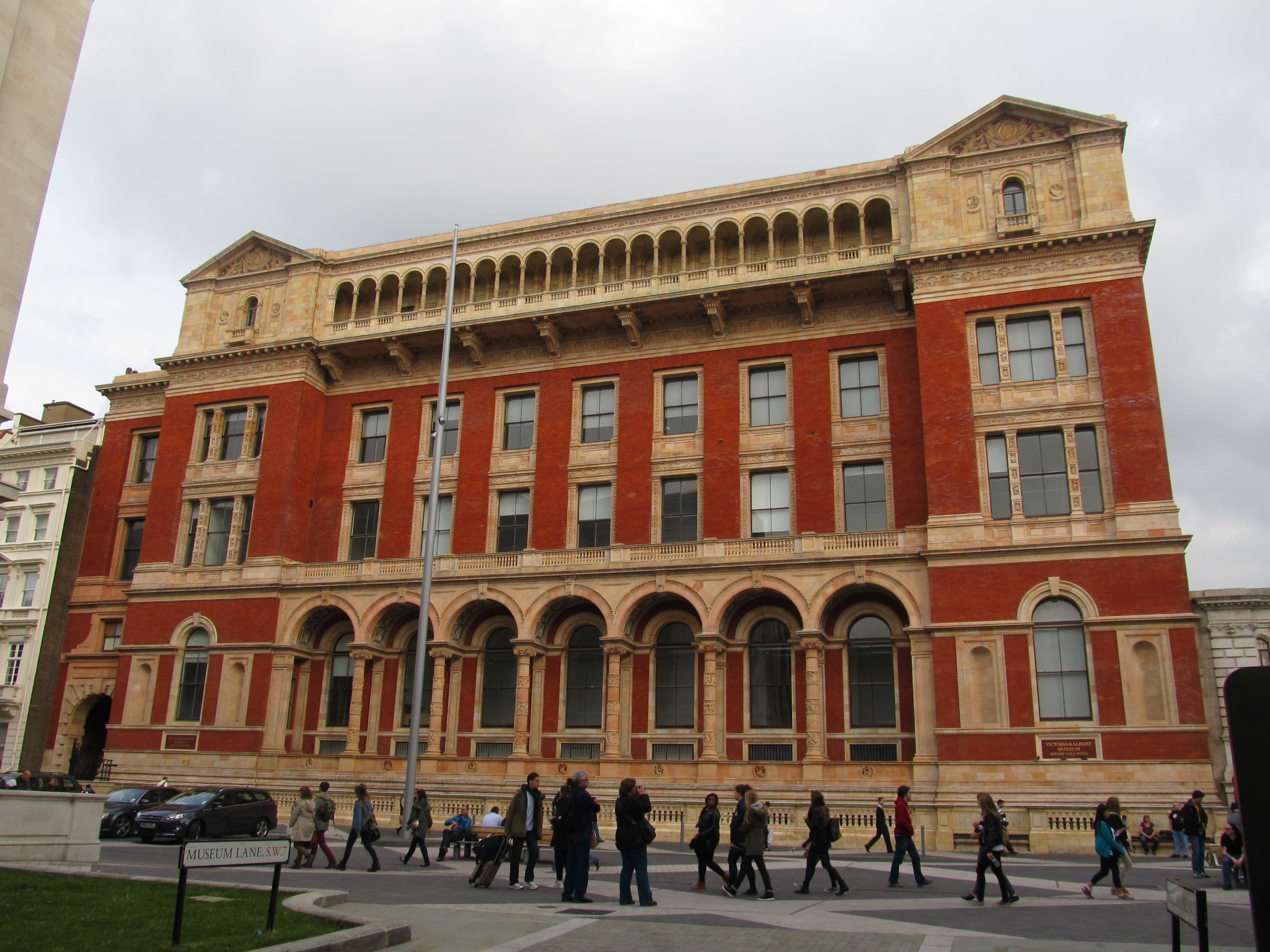
The Henry Cole Wing

Between 1867 and 1872, the architect Henry Young Darracott Scott designed, to the northwest of the garden, the five-storey School for Naval Architects (also known as the science schools) which, eventually, became the Henry Cole Wing of the museum. Scott's assistant, James William Wild designed the staircase that rises the full height of the building, which now houses the V&A prints collection and the RIBA Drawings and Archives Collections.

Various designers were responsible for the decoration of the Henry Cole Wing. The terracotta embellishments were the work of Godfrey Sykes, although sgraffito was used to decorate the east side of the building designed by F. W. Moody. The wrought iron gates made in 1885 were designed by John Starkie Gardner.

=== Creation of the Cast Courts ===
Cast of Portico of Glory, Room 46a

Scott also designed the two Architectural Courts, now the Cast Courts (1870–73) to the southeast of the garden. These vast spaces comprise two large, skylighted rooms three storeys high, plus a smaller corridor gallery. Building the rooms, with ceilings 83 feet (25 m) in height allowed the museum to bring together plaster casts previously displayed elsewhere in the building. For example, the cast of the Portico of Glory from the Santiago de Compostela Cathedral had previously only been displayed in sections in different parts of the building while the classical and Renaissance casts were kept in a corridor. Both courts initially contained original works and photographs alongside the plaster casts, with European subjects in one court and works from India in the other.

The courts now house hundreds of plaster casts of sculptures, friezes and tombs. One room is dominated by a full-scale replica of Trajan's Column, cast in two parts. The other includes reproductions of various works of Italian Renaissance sculpture and architecture, including a full-size replica of Michelangelo's David. Replicas of two earlier Davids by Donatello and Verrocchio, are also present. The two courts are divided by corridors on both storeys, and the partitions that used to line the upper corridor, now room 111, were removed in 2004 to allow the courts to be viewed from above.

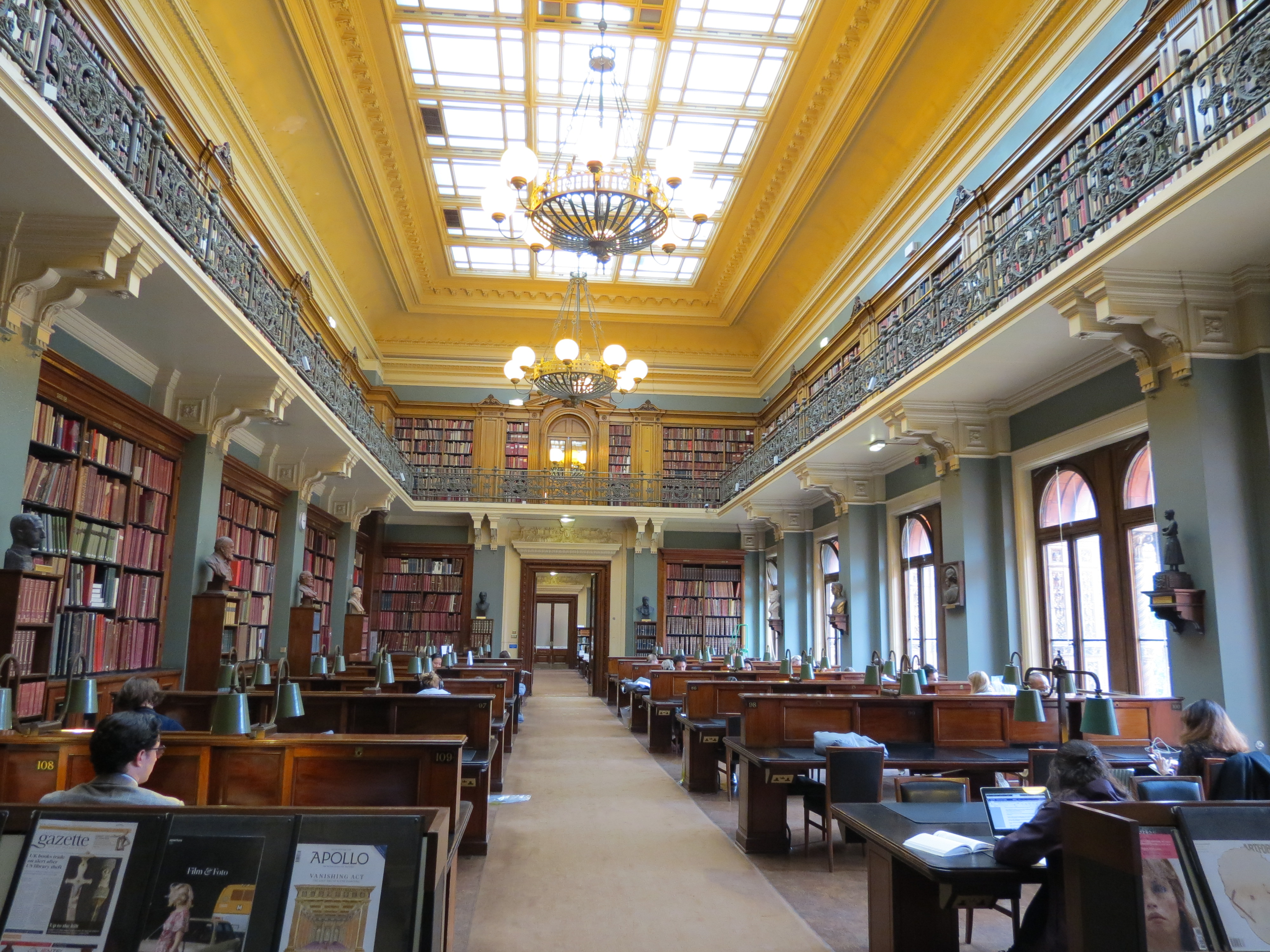
The National Art Library

The final part of the museum designed by Scott was the Art Library and what are now the sculpture galleries on the south side of the garden, built in 1877–1884. The exterior mosaic panels in the parapet were designed by Reuben Townroe, who also designed the plaster work in the library. Sir John Taylor designed the bookshelves and cases. This was the first part of the museum to have electric lighting. These works completed the northern half of the site, creating a quadrangle of buildings around the garden, but left the museum without a proper façade.

=== Cromwell Road façade built ===
In 1890 the government launched a competition to design new buildings that would give the museum an imposing front entrance along Cromwell Road and Cromwell Gardens. This competition was won, in 1891, by the architect Aston Webb. Queen Victoria returned to lay the foundation stone of the new building on 17 May 1899. It was during this ceremony that the change of name from "South Kensington Museum" to "Victoria and Albert Museum" was made public. Queen Victoria's address during the ceremony ended: "I trust that it will remain for ages a Monument of discerning Liberality and a Source of Refinement and Progress."

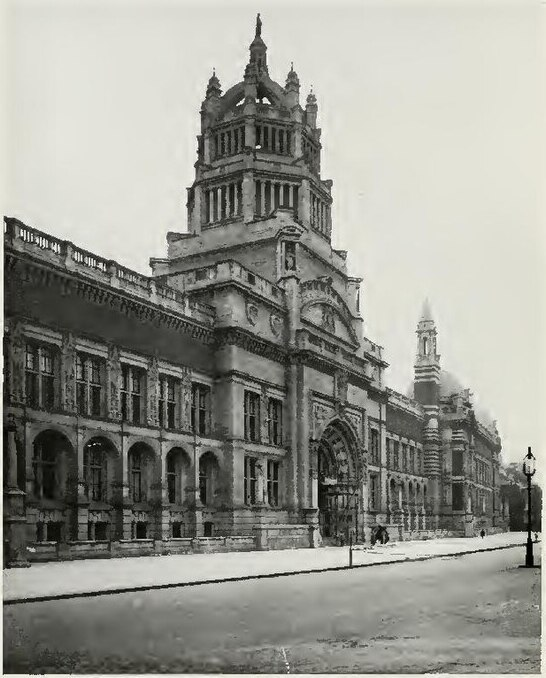
Victoria and Albert Museum, main Cromwell Road / Cromwell Gardens entrance (circa 1914)

Built between 1899 and 1909 in red brick and Portland stone, the new façade of the museum stretches 720 feet (220 m) along Cromwell Gardens. The main entrance consists of a series of shallow arches supported by slender columns and niches with twin doors. The tower above the entrance has an open work crown surmounted by a statue of Fame. The top row of gallery windows are interspersed with statues of British artists. Prince Albert and Queen Victoria, as sculpted by Alfred Drury, appear within the arches above the entrance doors. The façade surrounds four levels of galleries including, on the top floor, a series of rooms with glazed ceilings to allow in natural daylight and which now house the ceramics collection.

Webb's design also created the entrance Hall and rotunda, the areas now occupied by the shop, the Asian Galleries and the domed, octagonal Fashion Gallery plus the massive East Hall (Rooms 50a and 50b) and the West Hall. The latter now houses the Raphael Cartoons and temporary exhibitions. Marble was used in the entrance hall and on the flanking staircases. The opening ceremony, by King Edward VII and Queen Alexandra, for the Aston Webb building took place on 26 June 1909.

With so much additional space available, the museum reviewed its policy on how exhibits were displayed and decided upon a purely materials based approach, as opposed to grouping exhibits based on historical periods or cultures. This created several galleries with long rows of glass cases containing very similar looking objects. These displays were in contrast to the elaborate settings previously created by Cole and his associates. The new galleries, as originally designed by Webb, were white with restrained classical detail and mouldings, again in contrast to the elaborate decoration of the Victorian galleries, much of which was removed in the early 20th century. Despite much criticism in the press, the purely materials-based displays remained until the 1940s.

In 1914 the construction of the Science Museum began, marking the final split between the museum's science and art collections.

=== World War II ===
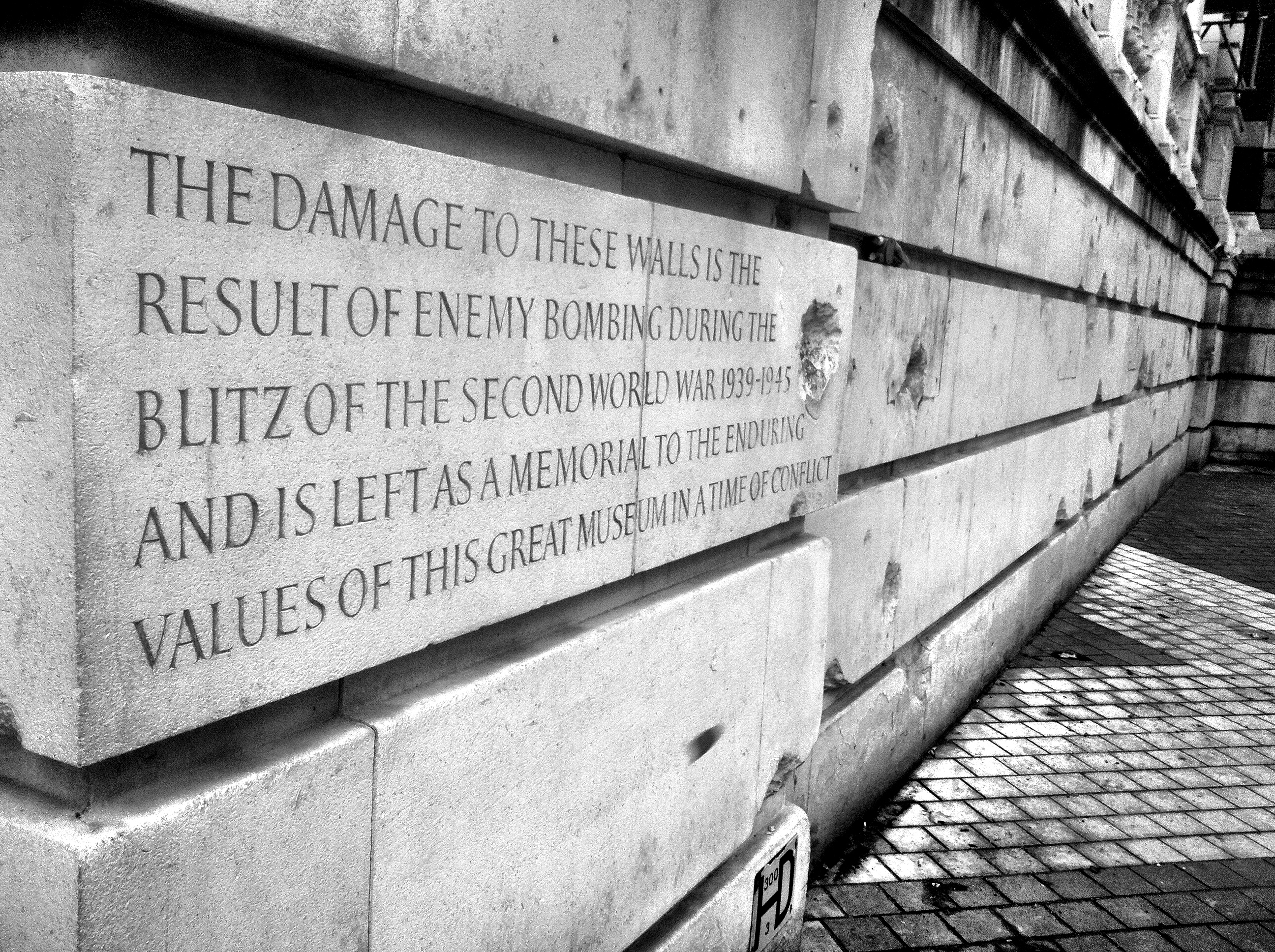
Bomb damage on the Exhibition Road facade

In 1939 on the outbreak of the Second World War, many items in the collection were sent to Westwood quarry in Bradford-on-Avon, to Montacute House in Somerset or to tunnels near Aldwych tube station and Brompton Road tube station. Larger objects remained in situ, sand-bagged and bricked in. The Raphael Cartoons were bricked up in a specially built shelter in the museum basement. Between 1941 and 1944 some galleries were used as a school for children evacuated from Gibraltar. The South Court became a canteen, first for the Royal Air Force and later for Bomb Damage Repair Squads. After the evacuation of the art works, the museum remained open throughout the war.

The South Kensington building survived the Second World War with relatively minor bomb damage. During The Blitz several incendiary bombs fell on the building and were successfully dealt with by the museum's staff and fire wardens. In November 1940, two bombs landed in Exhibition Road destroying the windows and grilles on that side of the building and further bomb damage occurred in April 1941. The pockmarks in the stonework visible on Exhibition Road were caused by fragments from those bombs.

A memorial, in Welsh slate, to the fourteen museum staff killed in the conflict was unveiled in the main entrance hall in 1950. Close by is the stone memorial plaque, carved by Eric Gill and Joseph Cribb, to the sixteen members of the museum staff killed in World War I.

=== Post-war period ===
After the war, the Britain Can Make It exhibition was held in the museum between September and November 1946, attracting nearly a million-and-a-half visitors. This was organised by the Council of Industrial Design, established by the British government in 1944 "to promote by all practicable means the improvement of design in the products of British industry". The success of this exhibition led to the planning of the Festival of Britain to be held in 1951.

By 1948, most of the objects that been sent elsewhere during the war had returned to the museum. The reinstallation was accompanied by a change in the museum's policy on the display of exhibits. It was decided that alongside the existing strictly material-based galleries, established in 1909, the museum should create exhibits based on particular styles, historic periods or nations. These guidelines were later revised to create the existing mixture of galleries focused on the production of objects, known as the Materials & Techniques Galleries, and the Art and Design Galleries that showcase the role of objects within a particular culture or nation.

In the immediate post-war years, there was little money available for anything other than essential repairs so the museum sought to expand by running English stately homes as satellite museums. From 1947, the museum ran the Wellington Museum at Apsley House in London until, in 2004, it was transferred to English Heritage. Also from 1947, until 1991, both Ham House and Osterley Park were run by the museum and are now under National Trust ownership.

The first major building work after the war was the creation of new storage space for books in the Art Library in 1966 and 1967. This involved flooring over the main hall to form the book stacks, and creating a new medieval gallery on the ground floor. In 2006 that space became the museum shop.

=== Restoration of the Refreshment Rooms ===
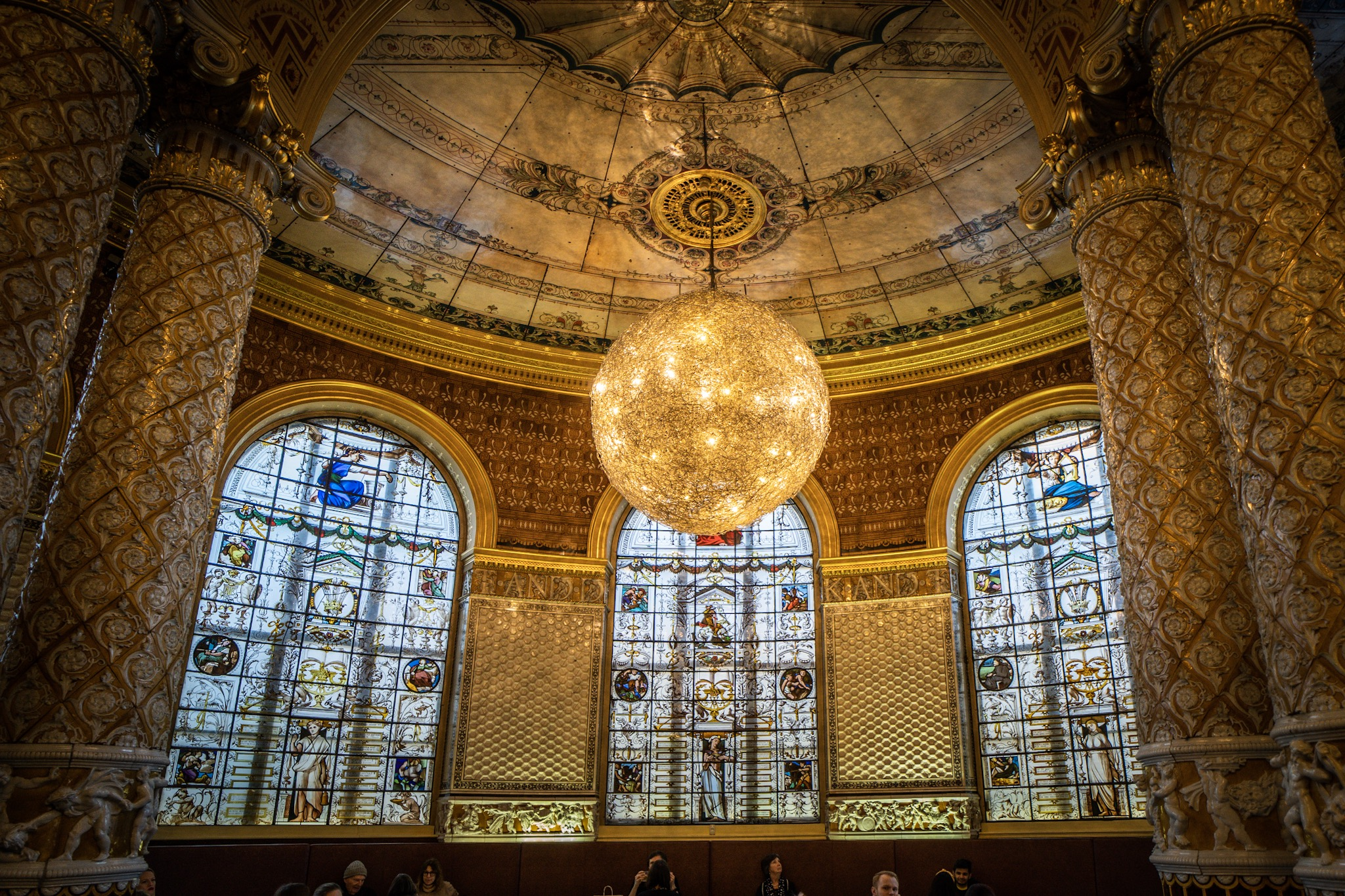
The Gamble Room

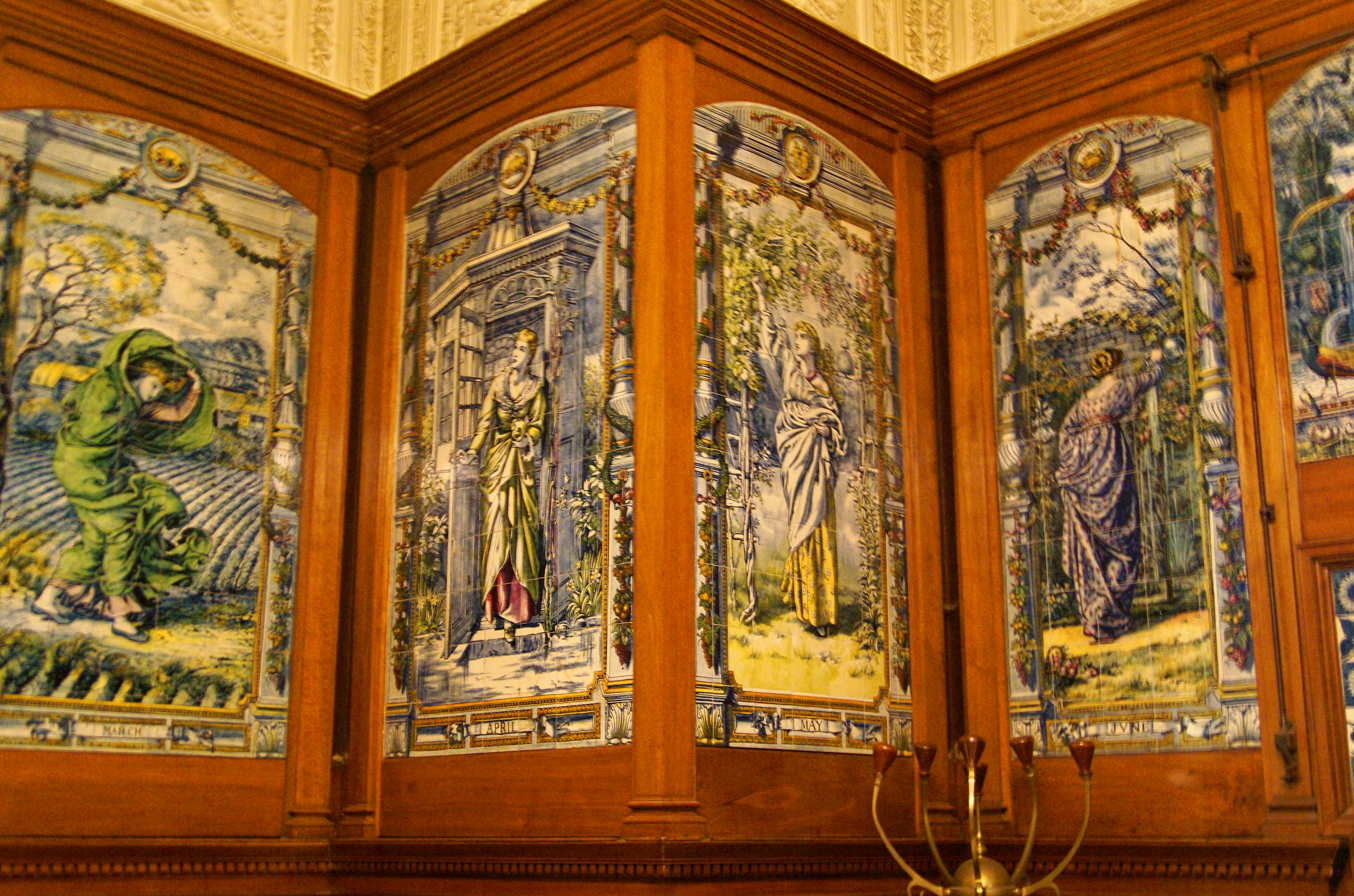
Tiles depicting the Four Seasons in the Poynter Room

By the 1970s, the museums suite of three refreshment rooms built in 1867 had become neglected. Two had become store rooms and the third open only as an exhibit. Between 1974 and 1978, the three rooms were fully restored and opened for public use. The interiors of the three rooms had originally been assigned to different designers and the rooms are now named after each of them.

The Green Dining Room (1866–68) was the work of Philip Webb and William Morris and is now the Morris Room. The lower part of the walls is wood panelled with a band of paintings on the main part of the wall, a plaster frieze around the ceiling and stained-glass windows by Edward Burne-Jones.

The Centre Refreshment Room (1865–77), now the Gamble Room, was designed in a Renaissance style by James Gamble. The walls and the columns in this room are covered in decorative and moulded ceramic tiles, the ceiling consists of elaborate designs on enamelled metal sheets and matching stained-glass windows. The marble fireplace was designed and sculpted by Alfred Stevens for Dorchester House and relocated on that building's demolition in 1929.

The Grill Room (1876–81) was designed by Sir Edward Poynter; the lower part of its walls consist of blue and white tiles enclosed by wood panelling, above which are tiles depicting the seasons and the months of the year. These were painted by students from the Art School then based in the museum. In the 2000s, Poynter's elaborate, artistic metal-work grill in the room was fully restored as were elements of the Morris room.

=== Late 20th-century developments ===
In July 1973 the V&A became the first museum in Britain to present a rock concert. A combined concert/lecture by the British progressive folk-rock band Gryphon, explored the links between medieval and contemporary music. Such events became a hallmark of the directorship of Sir Roy Strong and was subsequently emulated by some other British museums. Strong, who had become director of the museum in 1974, brought a fresh emphasis to increasing the museums' collection of contemporary designs and art works. He invited the Crafts Council to open a shop within the building to sell contemporary items.

Strong initiated a series of exhibitions championing the preservation of Britain's heritage. The 1974 exhibition The Destruction of the Country House 1875 - 1975 proved highly influential and is regarded as having enabled the formation of the campaigning group Save Britain's Heritage in 1975. That exhibition was followed, in 1977, by Change and Decay: The Future of our Churches and The Garden: A Celebration of 1,000 Years of British Gardening in 1979.

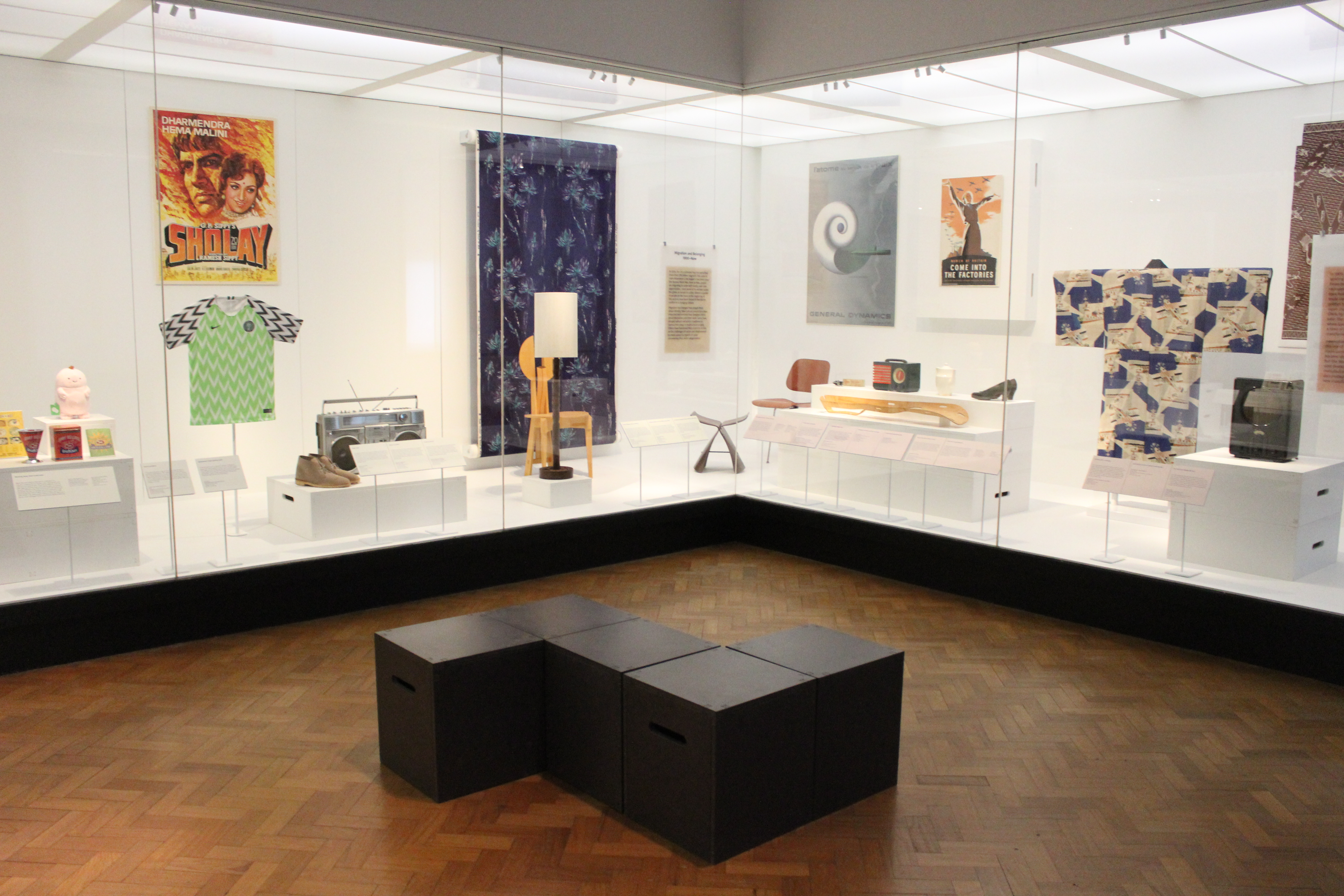
Part of the Design 1900 - Now galleries

The museums' branch in Bethnal Green was relaunched in 1974 as the Museum of Childhood, with the museums collection of toys, children's books and clothes being moved there. Items moved from Bethnal Green to South Kensington became, in 1987, the Art and Design in Europe and America 1800-1900 gallery and are now the Design 1900 - Now galleries.

In 1974 the museum acquired the Henry Cole wing from the Royal College of Science and adapted the building interior into a series of public galleries for prints, paintings and photographs. To link to the rest of the museum, a new entrance building were constructed on the site of the former boiler house between 1978 and 1982 and was officially opened by Queen Elizabeth II in March 1983. The entrance building was basically a concrete and glass corridor gallery. The only embellishment being the iron gates, by Christopher Hay and Douglas Coyne of the Royal College of Art, set in Aston Webb's 1909 screen wall. During the 1980s the space was used to host a series of exhibitions on industrial design and modern technology. These "Boilerhouse Project" exhibitions would, eventually, lead to the creation of the Design Museum.

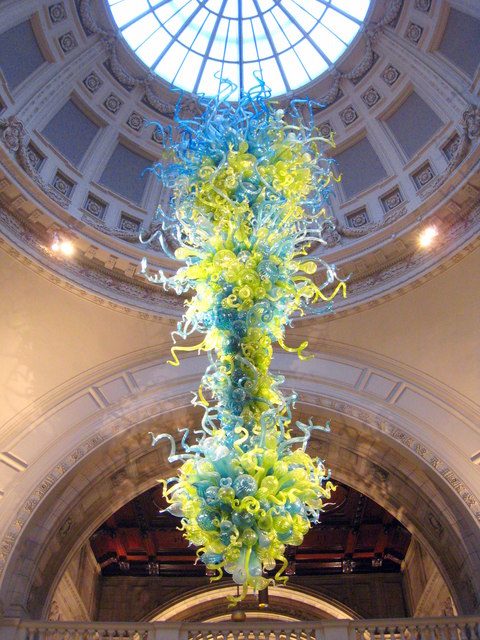
The V&A Rotunda Chandelier by Dale Chihuly

The façades around the garden quadrangle were fully cleaned and restored in 1977, as was the Lecture Theatre that year. The lower ground-floor galleries in the south-west part of the museum were redesigned, opening in 1978 as the Continental art 1600–1815 galleries. The Cast Courts were restored between 1978 and 1982, the Entrance Hall between 1983 and 1986 and the National Art Library in 1986. The garden quadrangle was landscaped and became the Pirelli garden in May 1987. The garden was subsequently redesigned in 2005.

The theatre collection was moved from South Kensington to its own site in Covent Garden in 1987 to become The Theatre Museum. Strong's successor Elizabeth Esteve-Coll oversaw a turbulent period for the institution in which the museum's curatorial and senior staff roles were re-defined, leading to public criticism from some staff. Esteve-Coll's attempts to make the V&A more accessible included a much criticised marketing campaign emphasising the café over the collection.

In 1999, the museum commissioned Dale Chihuly to create a large chandelier for the main entrance hall. Entitled "Ice Blue and Spring Green", the work was revised and enlarged in 2001 to produce the existing entrance hall chandelier.

=== Rebuilding the British galleries ===
In 2001, the rebuilding of the fifteen British galleries was completed. This was the largest project undertaken by the museum in fifty years. The new galleries replaced the English Primary galleries, installed in 1947-52, and the Victorian galleries created in 1964-66. Combined these were known as the British Art and Design galleries and by the 1990s were in a rather sorry state. Air pollution, mainly from traffic on the Cromwell Road, meant no fragile textiles or clothing could be displayed and an earlier botched refurbishment meant no objects dating from 1675 to 1730 were on show throughout the 1980s. Despite these issues, the decision to rebuild all fifteen galleries in a single project was considered ambitious.

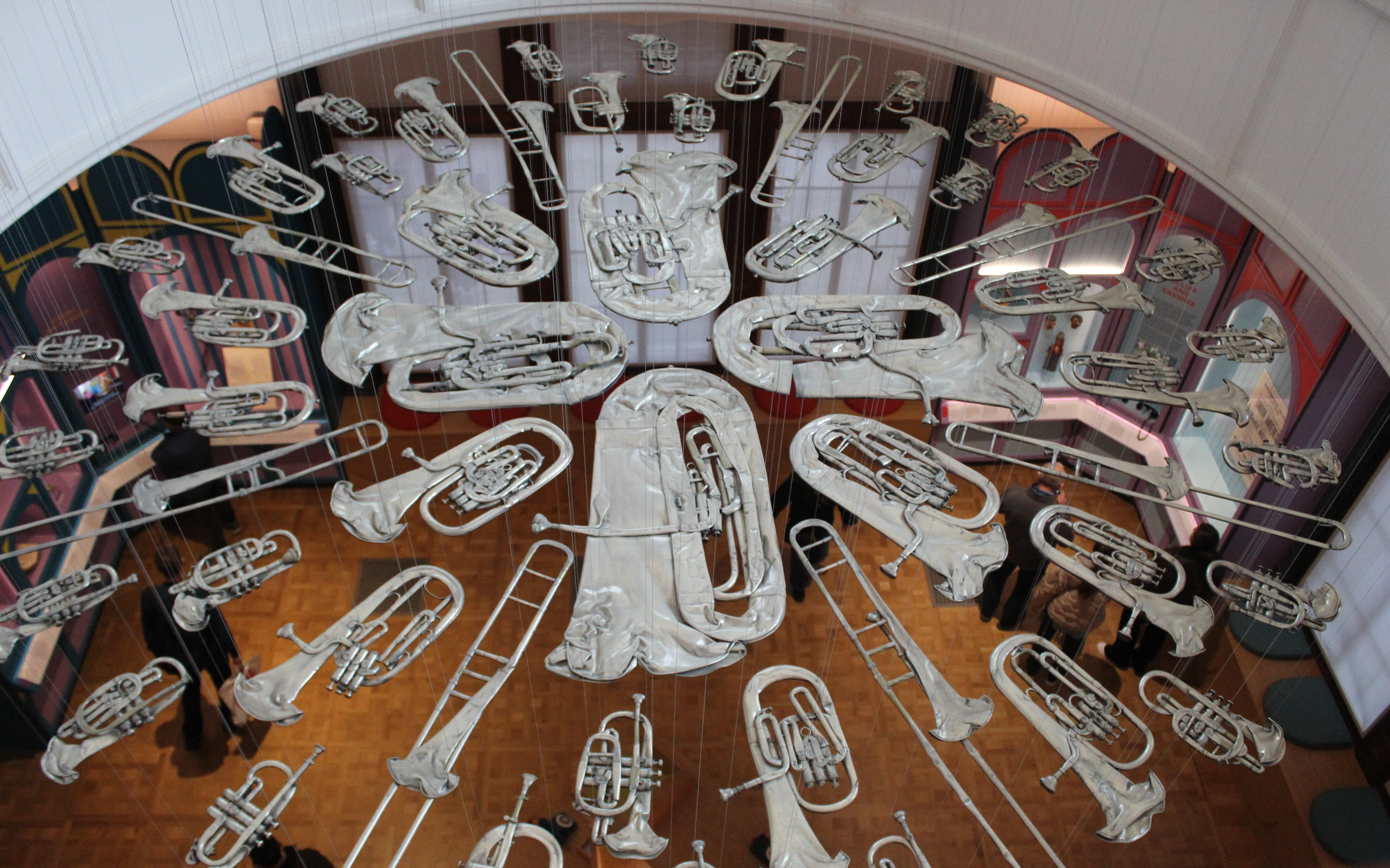
Breathless by Cornelia Parker

The completed project, by extending the galleries into adjacent storerooms and offices, increased the available display space by 25%, so allowing 3,000 objects to be displayed. The redesign also added study rooms, interactive spaces and allowed five complete period rooms to be installed. The new galleries included an artwork commissioned from Cornelia Parker, Breathless that consists of 54 brass musical instruments squashed flat. Also in 2001, new access ramps and steps, designed by Pringle Richards Sharratt, were installed at the main entrance.

=== FuturePlan Phase 1 ===
The success of the rebuilt British Galleries prompted the development of a long-term plan to redesign all the galleries in the museum. Starting in 2002, Phase 1 of the FuturePlan project saw 43 projects completed that upgraded some 26,500 square metres of the museum and brought 3,000 square metres of former office and storage space into public use.

Projects completed as part of phase 1 of the FuturePlan included;

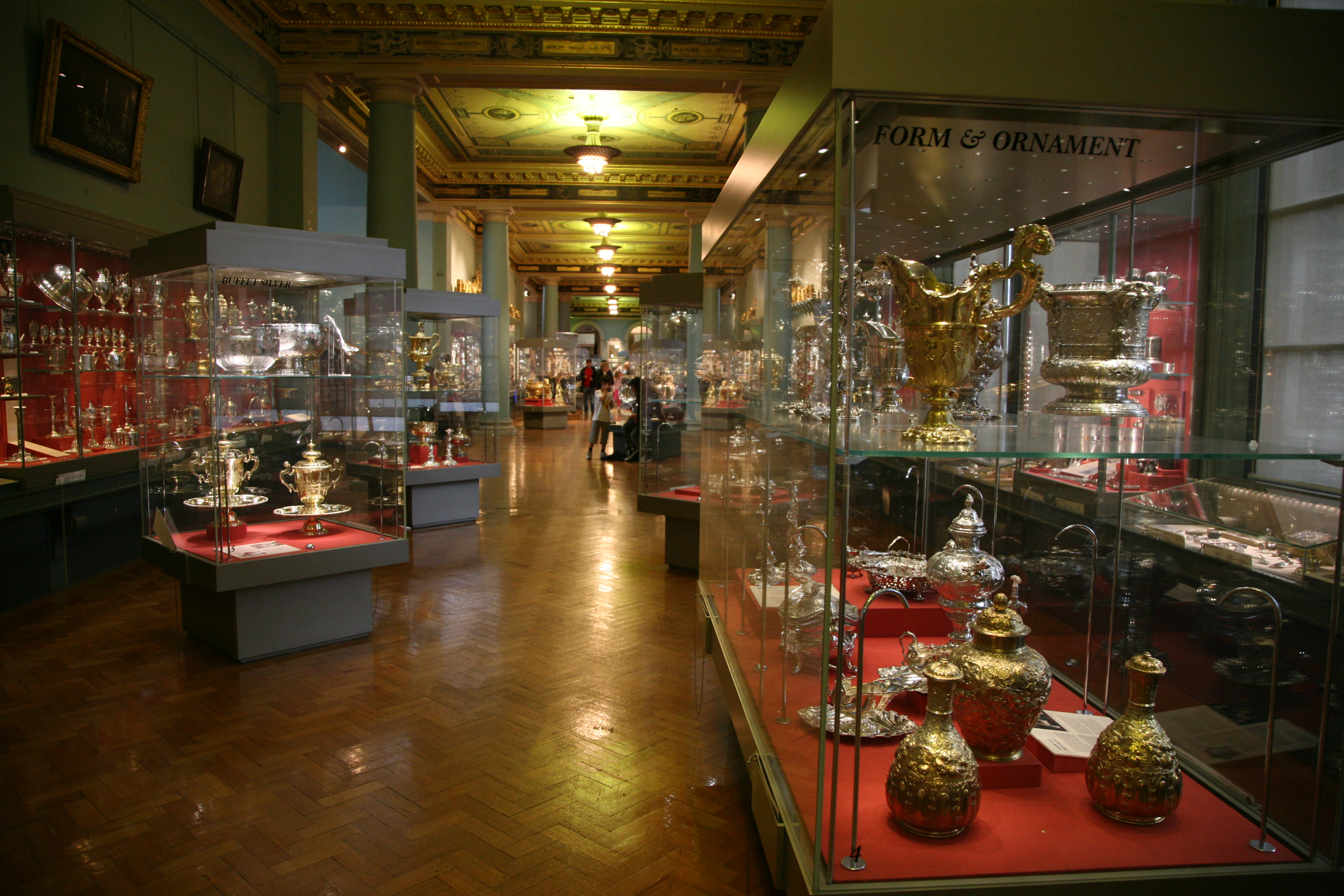
Silverware Gallery (Room 67)

- 2002: Restoration of the Victorian decoration in the Silver Gallery;
- 2002: A new gallery for temporary exhibitions of contemporary subjects was created. This closed in 2007 and a new gallery, the Porter Gallery, was created adjacent to the main entrance.
- 2003: Photography, the main entrance, Paintings Galleries, Prints & Drawings study area;
- 2004: The subway tunnel entrance was re-opened, new signage throughout the museum installed, metalware, glass, and the Gilbert Bayes sculpture gallery refurbished;
- 2004: The Members Room was designed by the architectural designers Softroom
- 2005: Portrait miniatures, metal work displays in Room 117, sacred silver and stained glass;
- 2005: Architecture Gallery was redesigned by Gareth Hoskins Architects

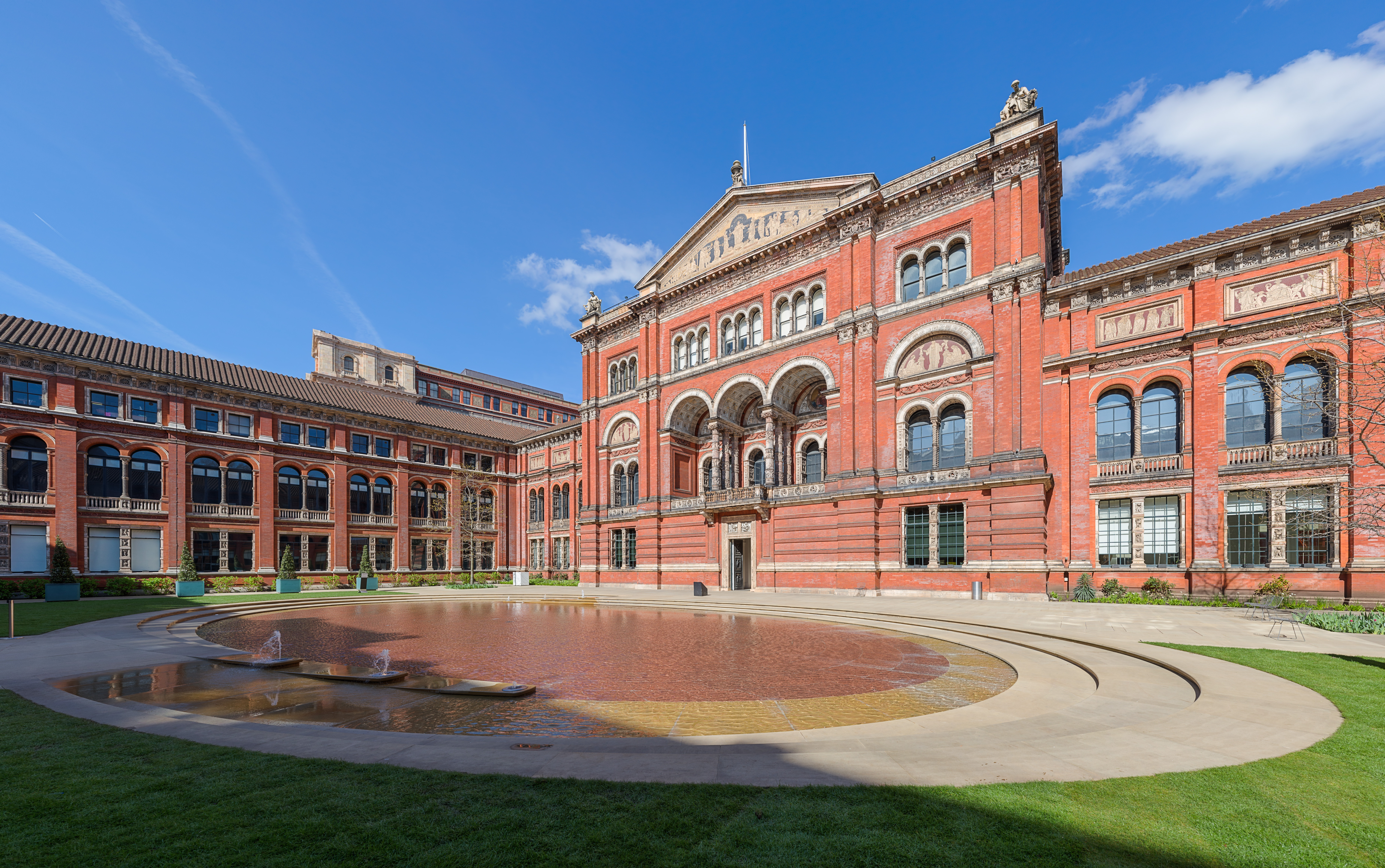
The John Madejski Garden

- 2005: The central garden was redesigned by Kim Wilkie and reopened as the John Madejski Garden. The design features an elliptical water feature, lined in stone with steps, in front of the bronze doors leading to the refreshment rooms. In summer a café is open in the southwest corner. The garden also hosts temporary exhibits.
- 2006: The Islamic Middle East Gallery, designed by Softroom, opened
- 2006: The new cafe on the north side of the garden, designed by McInnes Usher McKnight Architects, opened.
- 2008: The Sackler Centre for arts education, designed by Softroom, opened in the Henry Cole wing.
- 2008: Opening of the Jewellery Gallery, designed by Eva Jiřičná. Jiřičná also designed the enhancements to the main entrance and rotunda, the new shop, the tunnel entrance and the sculpture galleries.
- 2009: Re-development of the buddhist sculpture galleries, Rooms 17-20, by the V&A Design Department.
- 2009: Development of the gold, silver and mosaics galleries, by the V&A Design Department, to display the Gilbert Collection.
- 2010: Repair and conservation of the Exhibition Road facade.
- 2010: Renovation of the Ceramics Galleries by architects Stanton Williams and OPERA Amsterdam. This project also created a new space for temporary exhibitions, Room 146, and required the building of a link bridge to the Secretarial building as a fire escape.
- 2010: Renovation of the Sculpture 1300-1600 galleries, (Rooms 16a, 25,26 & 27) by V&A'S Design Department. This work restored the Victorian mosaic floors in the galleries that had been covered in linoleum after the Second World War.

=== New Medieval and Renaissance galleries created ===
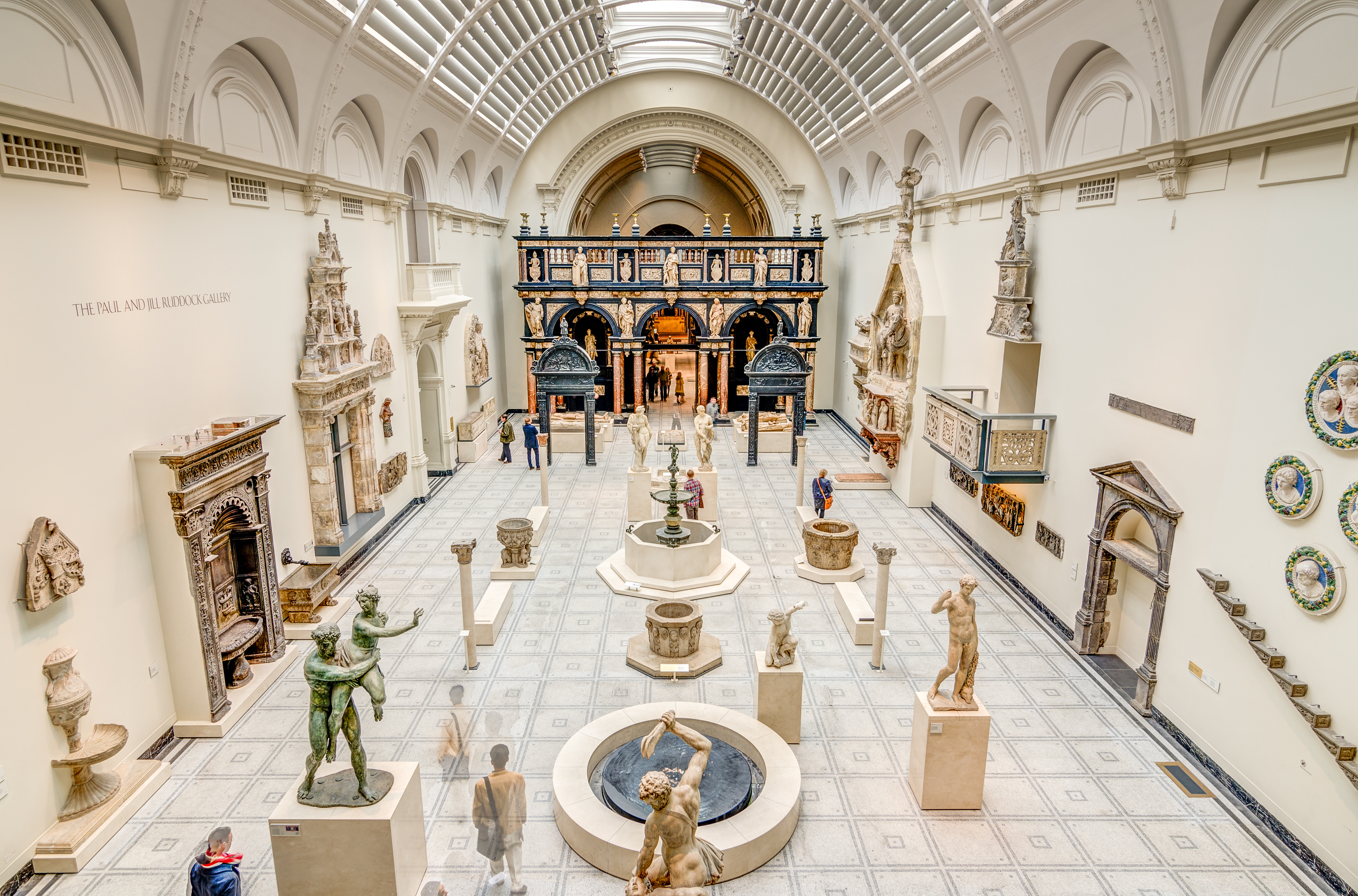
Medieval and Renaissance Galleries, V&A (Room 50a)

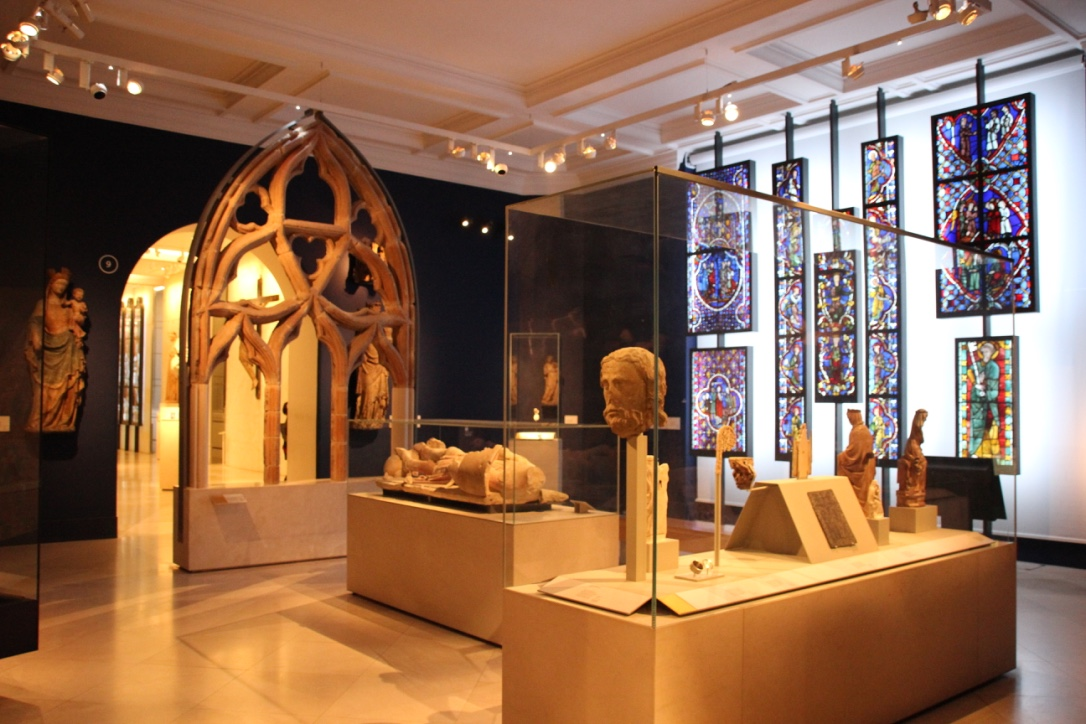
Medieval and Renaissance Galleries (Room 9)

In November 2009 the Medieval and Renaissance galleries opened to reviews bordering on the ecstatic. The ten galleries, designed by McInnes Usher McKnight Architects (MUMA), occupy three floors of the east side of the Aston Webb building. Critics praised the transformation of some of the museums' darkest and least hospitable spaces into bright, often naturally lit, areas displaying over 1,800 objects including some of the museum's rarest treasures. The decision to combine the two historic periods into a continuous display showcasing the links between them was also praised. The entire project took seven years to complete and cost £31.75 million. To link the three floors of the galleries an internal open-air service yard was converted into a glass-roofed gallery three stories high. This space allowed one of the largest objects in the collection to be displayed, the facade of Paul Pinder's house. The rood loft from St. John's Cathedral ('s-Hertogenbosch) in room 50a underwent conservation and cleaning to form the backdrop to a gallery containing well-heads, archways and balconys from Renaissance courtyards. The adjoining room, 50b, has a central aisle flanked by decorated alter-pieces leading to the chapel from the convent of Santa Chiara in Florence, the only Italian Renaissance chapel outside of Italy.

=== Exhibition Road Quarter opens ===
A proposed extension on Exhibition Road covering the area previously occupied by the museum's boilers was abandoned in 2004 after failing to receive funding from the Heritage Lottery Fund. That scheme was designed by Daniel Libeskind with Cecil Balmond and was known as The Spiral.

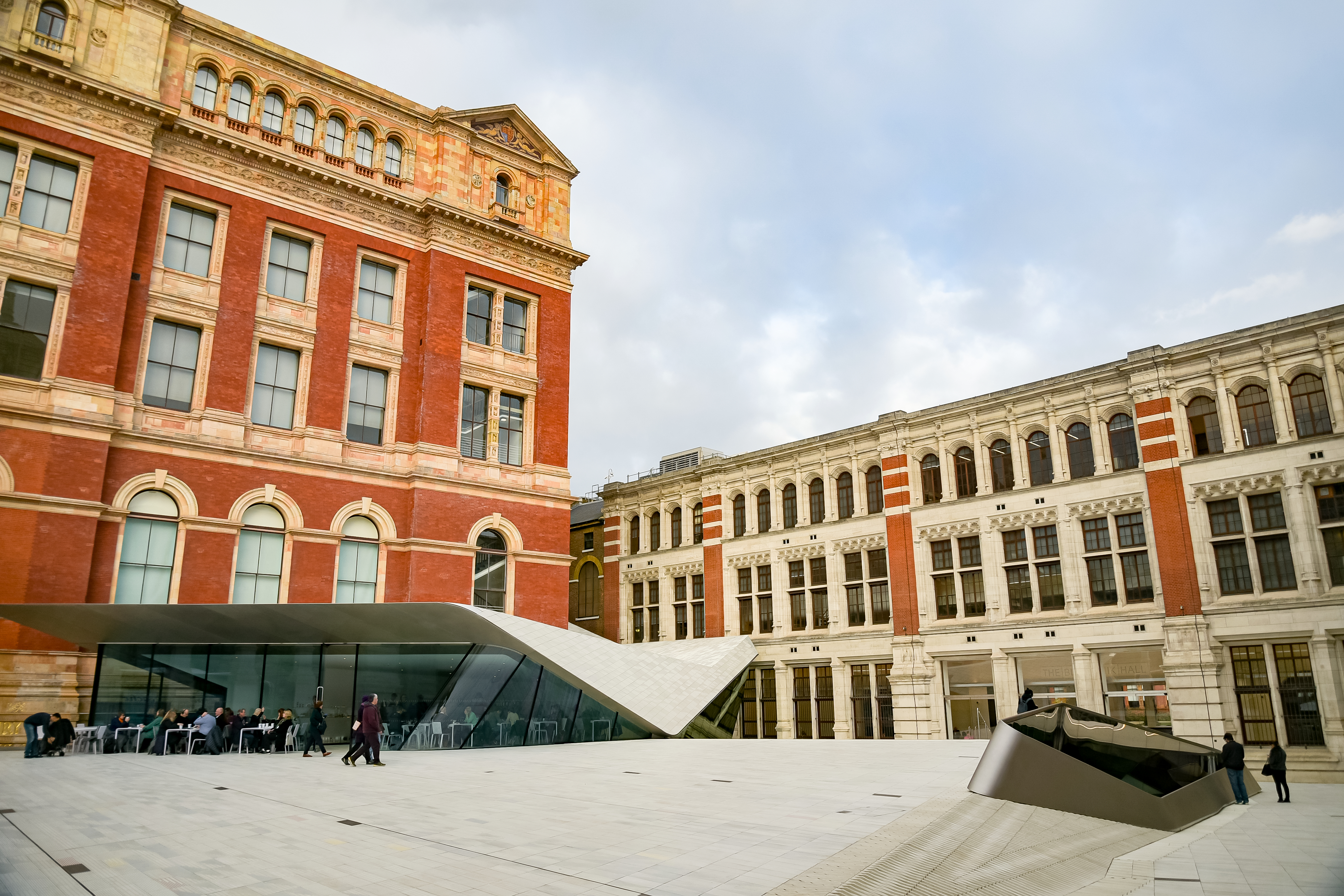
Exhibition Road Quarter

In its place a new Exhibition Road Quarter, designed by Amanda Levete's AL A practice, was built and opened in 2017. It features a porcelain-tiled courtyard, now named the Exhibition Road Courtyard and a new column-less 1,100-square-metre underground gallery for temporary exhibitions. This space, the Sainsbury Gallery, is accessed through a new entrance, the Blavatnik Hall. The Exhibition Road Quarter project created 6,400 square metres of extra space, which was the largest expansion at the museum in over 100 years. The Aston Webb Screen, the colonnade built to hide the museum's boilers, was restored with sections removed to allow access to the courtyard. The new 1,200-square meter courtyard is the world's first all-porcelain courtyard and is covered with 11,000 handmade porcelain tiles. A pavilion with glass walls and an angular roof sits in one corner and contains a cafe. Skylights provide natural light for the stairwell and the exhibition space below.

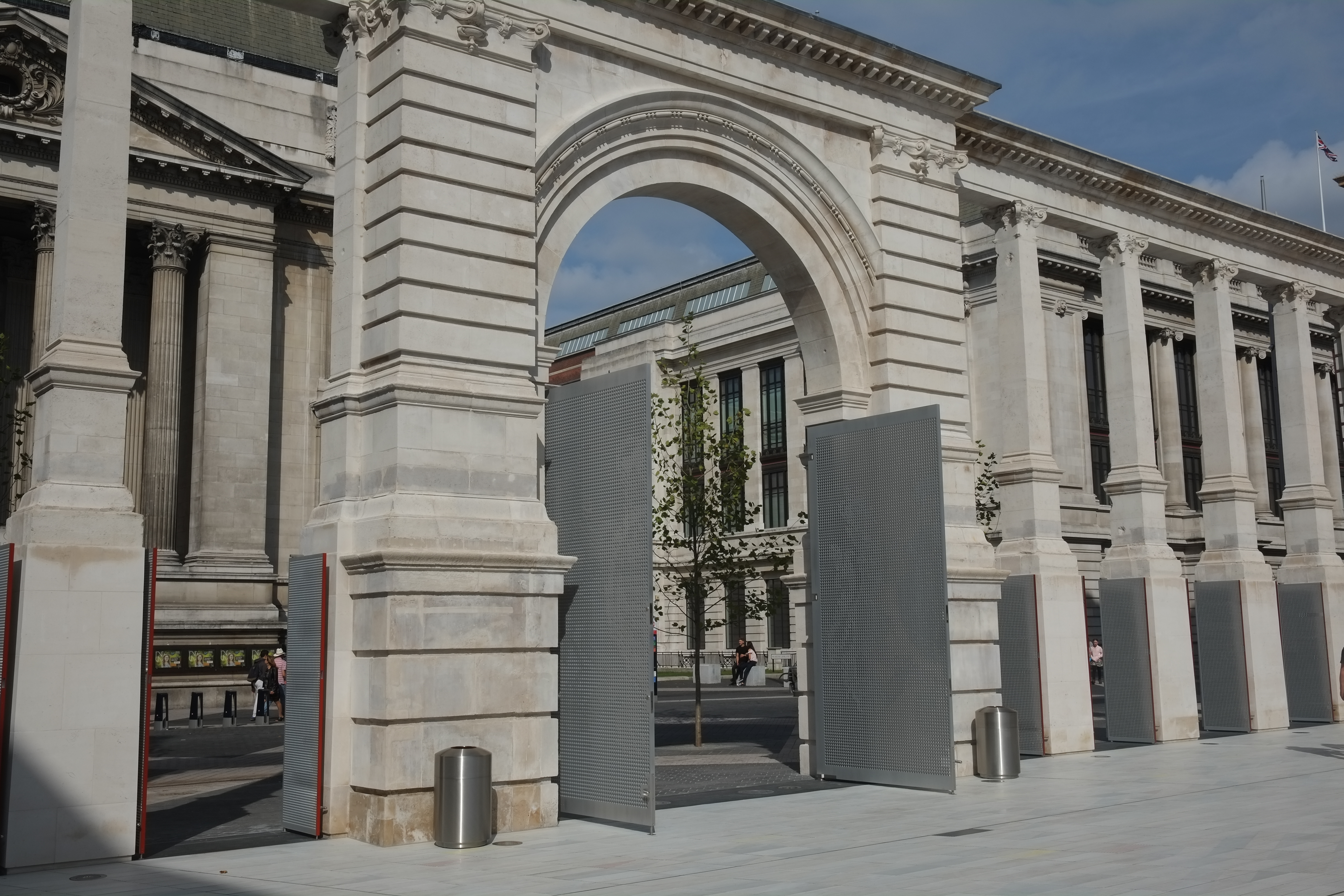
Entrance to the Exhibition Road Quarter via the Aston Webb screen

When it opened, the Exhibition Road Courtyard was named the Sackler courtyard, having been partly sponsored by the Sackler family, which owned Purdue Pharma, makers of the addictive opioid painkiller OxyContin. In November 2019 the artist Nan Goldin led a "die-in" in the courtyard entrance, in protest against the V&A's acceptance of donations from the Sacklers. The museum's director, Tristram Hunt, defended the museum's relationship with the Sacklers, saying it was proud to have received their support over a number of years. In 2022 the museum announced it was cutting all financial ties to the Sackler family and the Sackler name was removed from both the courtyard and the education centre.

=== FuturePlan Phase 2 ===
The success of the FuturePlan projects led to funding becoming available for redesigning other areas of the museum. Termed FuturePlan Phase 2, these projects included;-

- European galleries for the 17th century and the 18th century, designed by ZMMA, opened on 9 December 2015 and restored the original Victorian interiors.
- The V&A Shop, designed by Friends & Co, opened in May 2017
- The Cast Courts, re-designed by Metaphor, with the East Court re-opening in 2014 and the West Court in 2018
- A new Members' Room, designed by Garmody Groarke, opened in the Aston Webb Building, in September 2017.
- Phase One of the Photography Centre, designed by David Kohn Architects opened in October 2018, and greatly increased the floor space of the gallery. Phase One was officially opened by the Duchess of Cambridge who had become the royal patron of the museum in March 2018. Phase 2 of the Photography Centre opened in 2022 and created a reading room and two galleries for temporary exhibitions.

On 15 September 2018, the first V&A museum outside London, V&A Dundee, opened. The museum, built at a cost of £80.11m, is located on Dundee's waterfront, and is focused on Scottish design, furniture, textiles, fashion, architecture, engineering and digital design.

In 2019 the V&A received sponsorship for an exhibition on cars from Bosch, which had been fined €90 million over its part in the diesel emissions scandal. A V&A spokeswoman said: "Bosch is at the forefront of innovation, with a focus on delivering sustainable solutions for the mobility of the future."

=== Recent events and developments ===
In 2021 plans to cut the museum's costs by reorganising its collections by date rather than by material were abandoned after critics said it would lead to staff cuts and thereby a loss of expertise.

By September 2024, those objects stored at Blythe House had been moved to the V&A East Storehouse in East London. The move required the transfer of 331,321 object parts, 350,000 library volumes and 915 archive collections.

The Fashion Gallery closed at the end of 2025 for a major re-build and will reopen in Spring 2027.

The Design 1900-Now galleries reopened in February 2026 with a total of 250 items on display, including 60 new additions.

In March 2026 the four rooms housing the Rosalinde and Arthur Gilbert Collection were re-opened after a major refurbishment. Three new rooms, (70b, 71a and 72a) for the collection were created from former offices. The new design allows a greater emphasis on the micromosaics, rather than the gold and silver objects, in the collection and more information on the provenance of the objects to be shown. These galleries hosted programming as part of the inaugural Jewish Culture Month in 2026, including a curator-led tour of English Jewish ceramics and Shavuot storytelling events drawn from the Gilbert Collection.

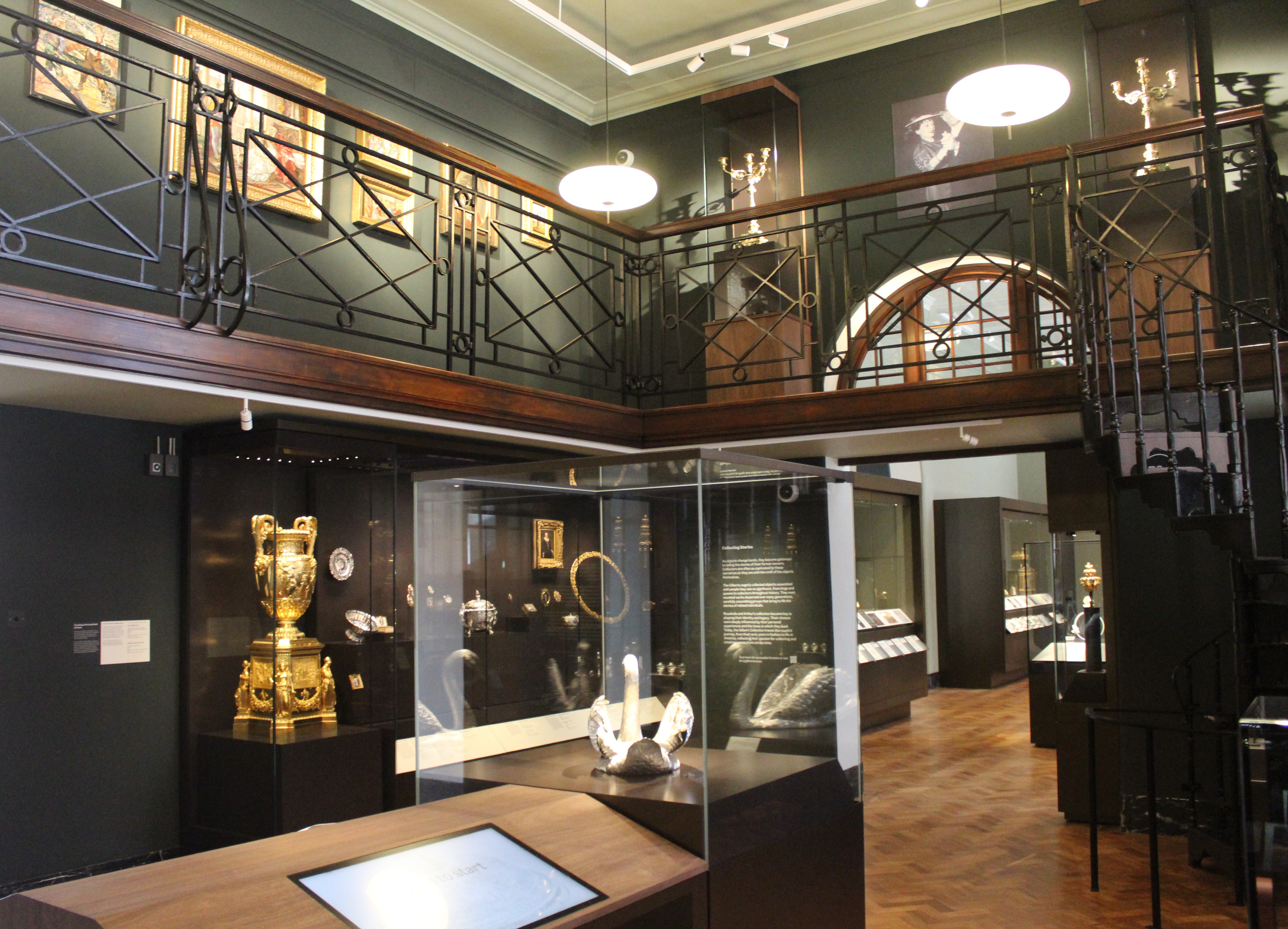
Room 70b

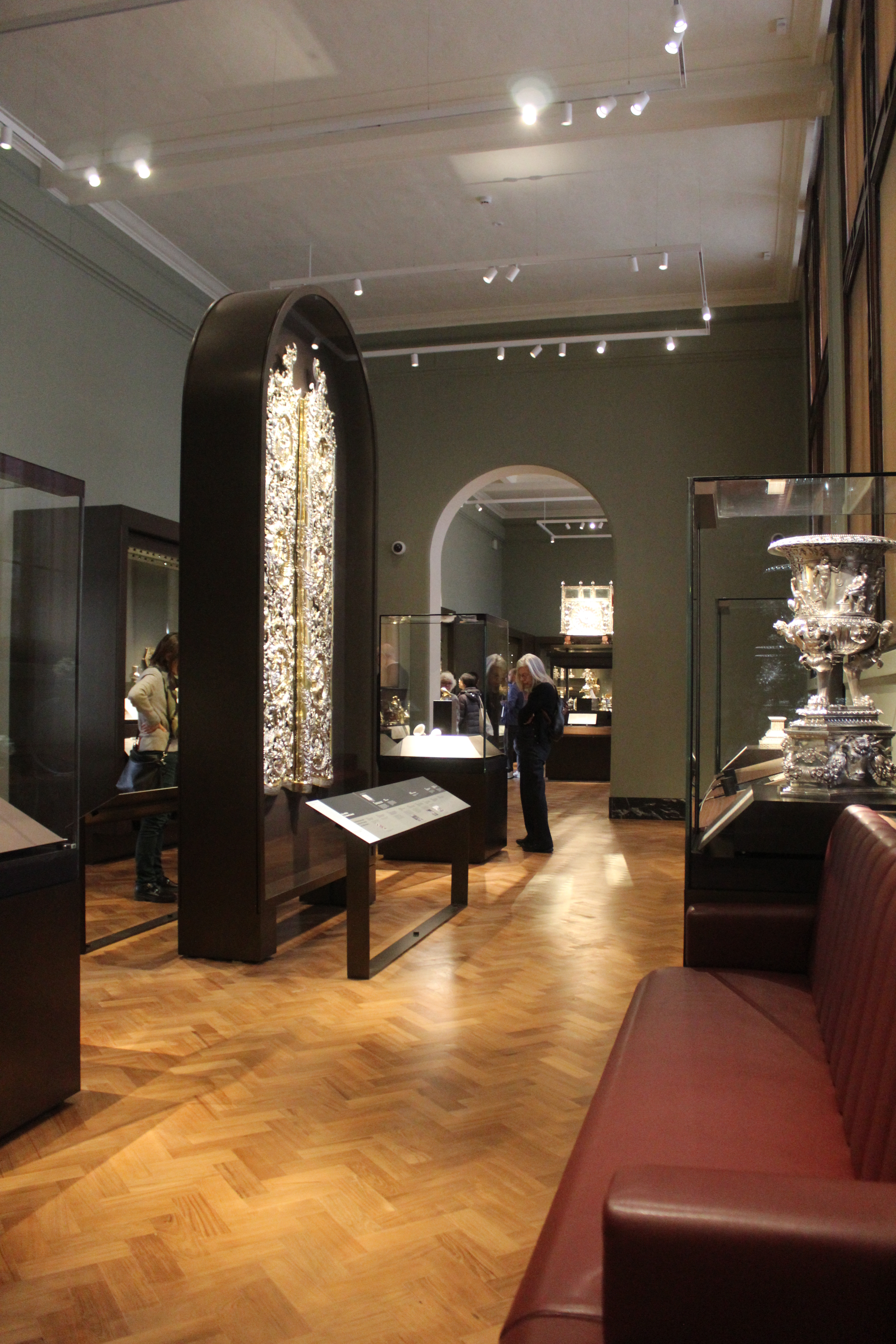
Room 71a

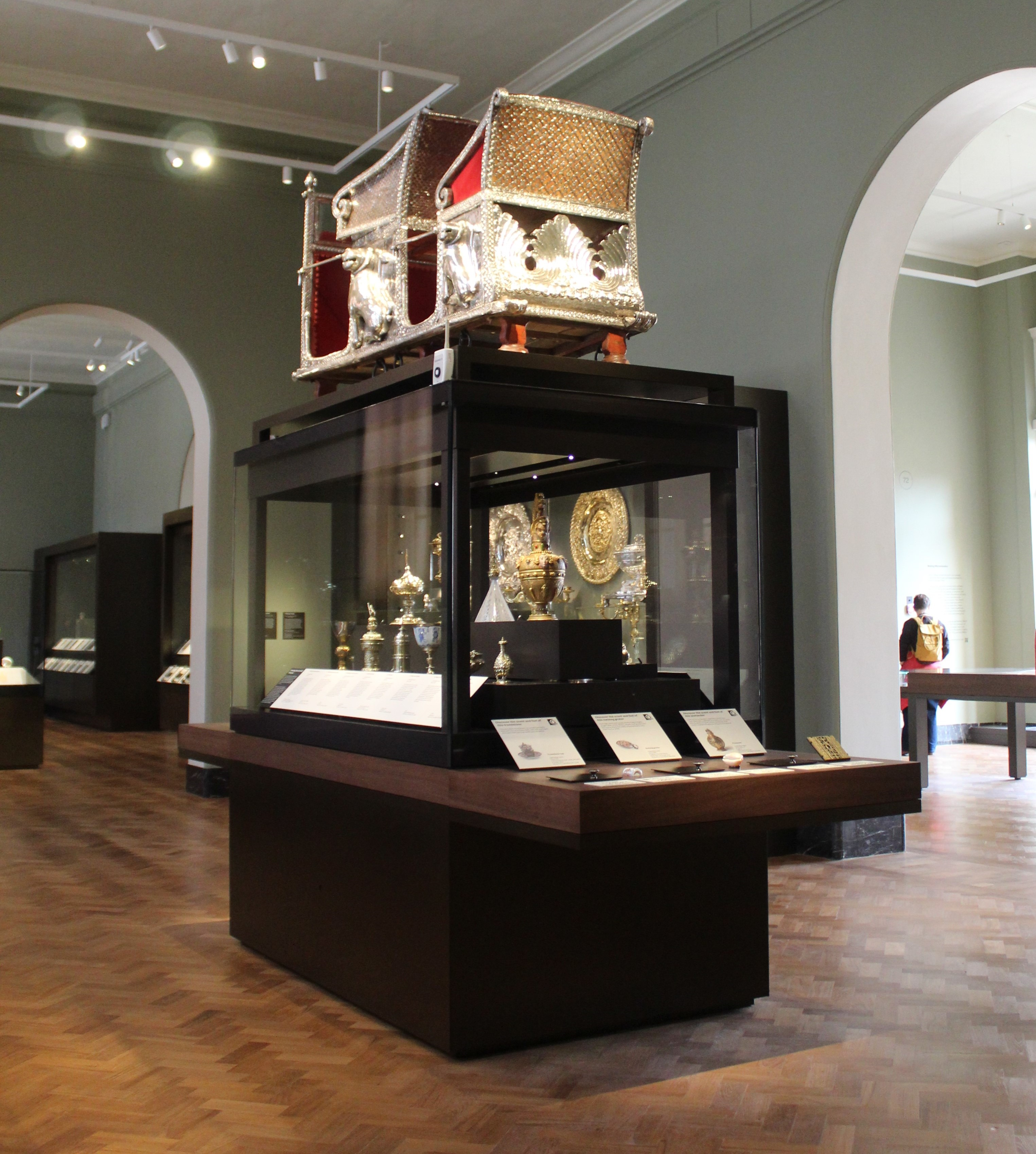
Room 72a

In 2026, the V&A agreed to censor images of 1930s-era maps of China at the request of the Chinese government's General Administration of Press and Publication.

In September 2026, 700 museum workers (over half the V&A's workforce) went on strike in a dispute over pay and working conditions, including concerns about safe working temperatures after a summer of severe heatwaves. In October 2026, the museum announced a voluntary redundancy scheme and plans to restructure the V&A Academy due to financial difficulties. In November, it confirmed plans to end in-person courses at the V&A Academy, while continuing to offer online learning.

== Collections ==
The museum collection consists of 2.83 million objects of which, as of March 2025, 62,894 objects were on public display across the different sites. Some 40 to 50 objects are contested in terms of past ownership.

The V&A's holdings are organised into four main curatorial departments:

- Decorative Art and Sculpture;
- Performance, Furniture, Textiles and Fashion;
- Art, Architecture, Photography and Design;
- Asia.

The following table lists the total number of objects within each collection across all of the museum's public sites, and at its collection store in Dean Hill Park, Wiltshire, as of September 2025.

Collection	Number of objects
Art, Architecture, Photography & Design	1,173,589
Asia	144,557 plus 1 archive collection
Performance, Furniture, Textiles & Fashion	172,381
Decorative Art & Sculpture	176,930 plus 18 archives. Includes approximately 63,000 items in the Wedgewood collection
Young V&A collections	36,539
Research, National Art Library & Archives	1,133,515 library items plus 1,190 archives

=== Architecture ===
In 2004, the V&A alongside Royal Institute of British Architects opened the first permanent gallery in the UK covering the history of architecture with displays using models, photographs, elements from buildings and original drawings. At the same time, the RIBA Drawings and Archives Collection was transferred to the museum, joining the already extensive collection held by the V&A. With over 600,000 drawings, over 750,000 papers and paraphernalia, and over 700,000 photographs, together they form the world's most comprehensive architectural resource.

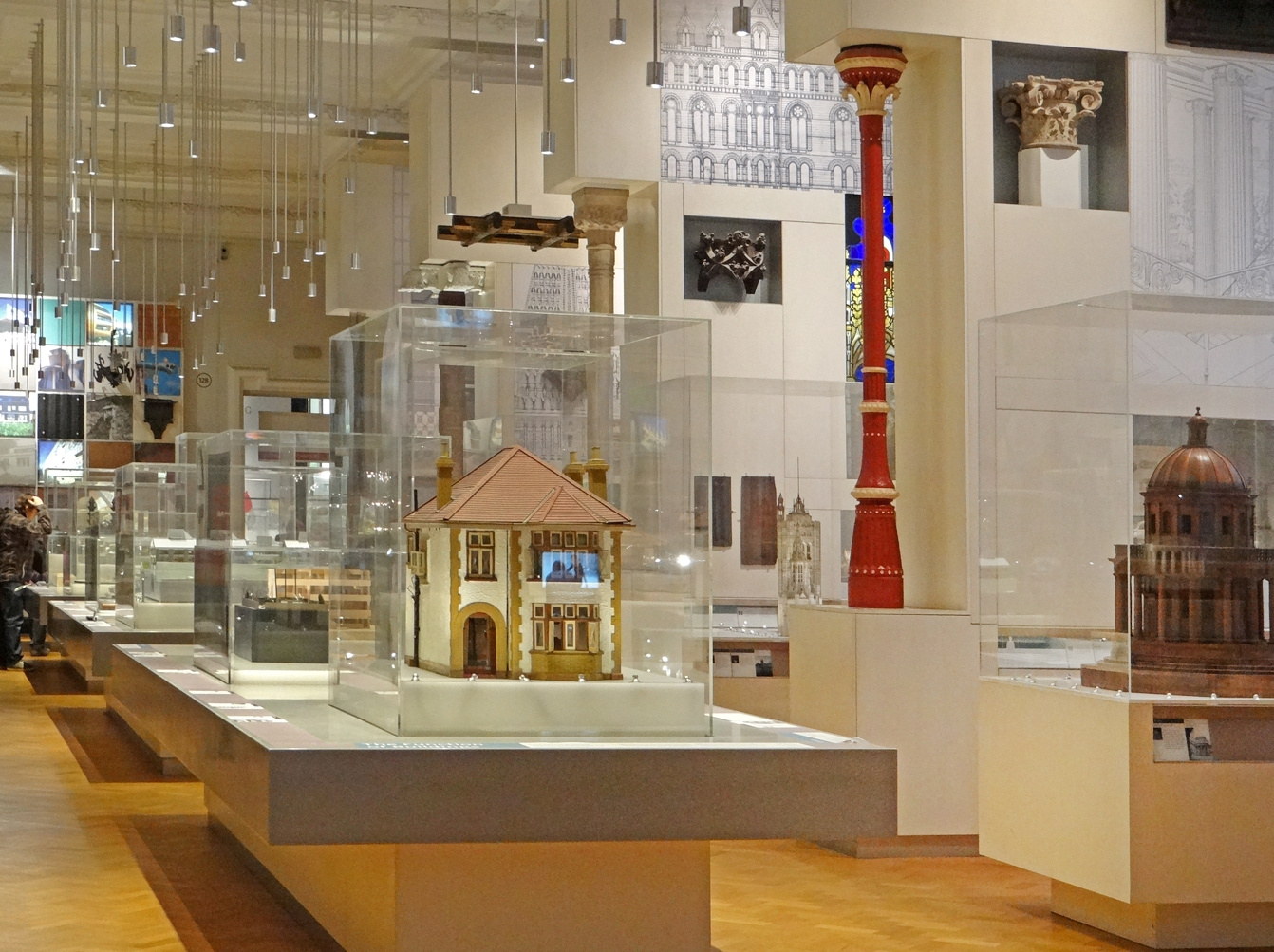
Room 128, The Architecture Gallery

Many European and American architects' drawings are held in the collection. The RIBA's holdings of over 330 drawings by Andrea Palladio are the largest in the world. Also well represented are Jacques Gentilhatre and Antonio Visentini.

British architects whose drawings, and in some cases building models, are in the collection, include: Inigo Jones, Sir Christopher Wren, Robert Adam, Sir William Chambers, Sir John Soane, Sir Charles Barry, Charles Robert Cockerell, Augustus Welby Northmore Pugin, Richard Norman Shaw, Sir Edwin Lutyens, Charles Rennie Mackintosh, Charles Holden, Lord Richard Rogers, Lord Norman Foster.

As well as period rooms, the collection includes parts of buildings, for example, the two top stories of the facade of Sir Paul Pindar's house dated c. 1600 from Bishopsgate with elaborately carved woodwork and leaded windows, a rare survivor of the Great Fire of London. A brick portal from a London house of the English Restoration period and a fireplace from the gallery of Northumberland house. European examples include a dormer window dated 1523–1535 from the chateau of Montal. There are several examples from Italian Renaissance buildings including, portals, fireplaces, balconies and a stone buffet that used to have a built-in fountain. The main architecture gallery has a series of pillars from various buildings and different periods, for example, a column from the Alhambra. Examples from Asia are in those galleries concerned with those countries, as well as models and photographs in the main architecture gallery.

In June 2022, RIBA announced it would be terminating its 20-year partnership with the V&A in 2027, "by mutual agreement", ending the permanent architecture gallery at the museum. Artefacts will be transferred back to the RIBA's existing collections, with some rehoused at the institute's headquarters at 66 Portland Place, set to become a new House of Architecture following a £20 million refurbishment.

=== Islamic art ===
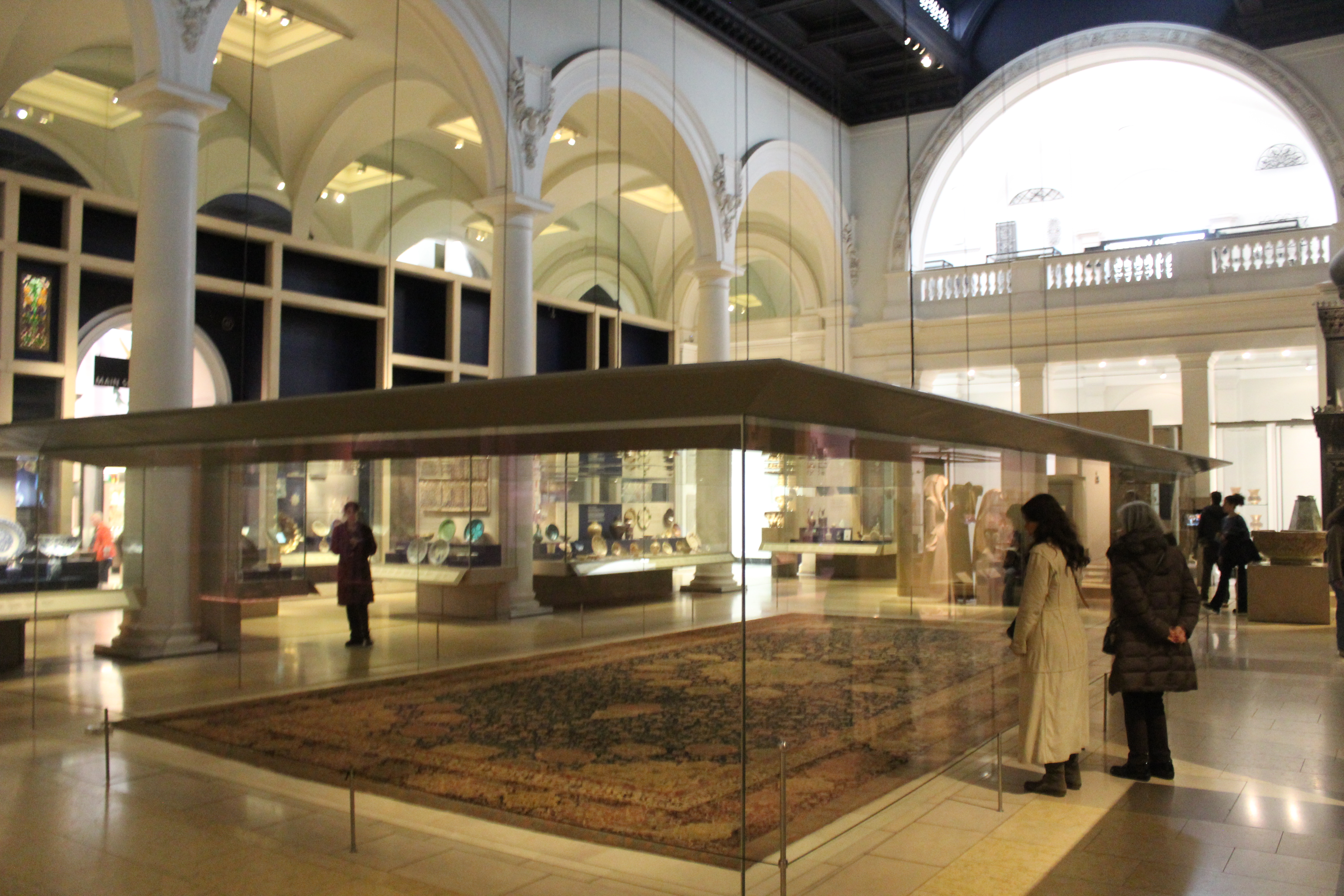
Room 42, the Islamic Middle East gallery

The museum holds over 19,000 objects from the Islamic world, ranging from the early Islamic period (the 7th century) to the early 20th century. The Jameel Gallery of Islamic Art, opened in 2006, houses 400 objects from Spain, North Africa, the Middle East, Central Asia and Afghanistan. The centrepiece of the gallery is the Ardabil Carpet. Many examples of Qur'āns with exquisite calligraphy dating from various periods are on display. A 15th-century minbar from a Cairo mosque with ivory forming complex geometrical patterns inlaid in wood is one of the larger objects on display. Extensive examples of ceramics especially Iznik pottery, glasswork including 14th-century lamps from mosques and metalwork are on display. A 10th-century rock crystal ewer is considered a masterpiece of Islamic art. The collection of Middle Eastern carpets and Persian rugs is amongst the finest in the world, many were part of the Salting Bequest of 1909. Examples of tile work include a fireplace dated 1731 from Istanbul made of intricately decorated blue and white tiles. Turquoise tiles from the exterior of buildings in Samarkand are also displayed.

=== Asia ===
The V&A's Asia collection numbers more than 160,000 objects, one of the largest in existence. It has one of the world's most comprehensive and important collections of Chinese art whilst the collection of South Asian Art is the most important in the West. The museum's coverage includes pieces from South and South East Asia, Himalayan kingdoms, China, the Far East and the Islamic world.

==== South Asia ====
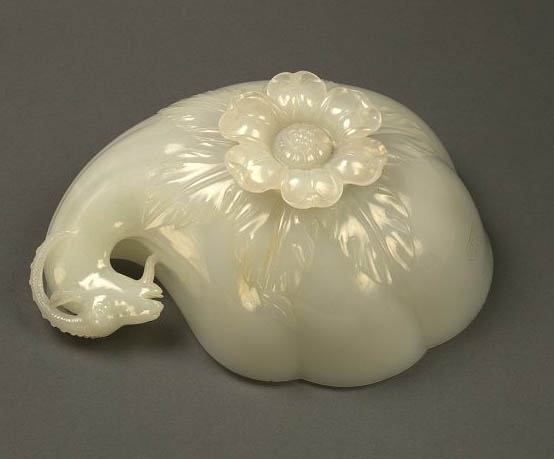
Wine cup of Shah Jahan.

The museum's collections of South and South-East Asian art are the most comprehensive and important in the West comprising nearly 60,000 objects, including about 10,000 textiles and 6,000 paintings' The Jawaharlal Nehru gallery of Indian art, which opened in 1991, contains art from about 500 BC to the 19th century. There is an extensive collection of sculptures, mainly of a religious nature, Hindu, Buddhist and Jain. The gallery includes the art from the Mughal Empire and the Maratha Confederacy, including portraits of the emperors and other paintings and drawings, jade wine cups and gold spoons inset with emeralds, diamonds and rubies. Also from this period are parts of buildings such as a jaali and pillars. Clothing and textiles produced in India, from dyed cotton chintz, muslin to embroidery work using gold and silver thread, coloured sequins and beads are displayed, as are carpets from Agra and Lahore.

In 1879–80, the collections of the defunct East India Company's India Museum were transferred to the V&A and the British Museum. Items in the collection include Tipu's Tiger, an 18th-century automaton created for Tipu Sultan, the ruler of the Kingdom of Mysore and the Wine cup of Shah Jahan, the personal wine cup of a Mughal Emperor.

As of March 2026, the South Asia gallery at South Kensington is closed for a major refurbishment and is due to reopen in 2028.

==== East Asia ====
The Far Eastern collections include more than 70,000 works of art from China, Japan and Korea.

The T. T. Tsui Gallery of Chinese art opened in 1991, displaying a representative collection of the V&As approximately 16,000 objects from China, dating from the 4th millennium BC to the present day. Though the majority of artworks on display date from the Ming and Qing dynasties, there are objects dating from the Tang dynasty and earlier periods, among them a metre-high bronze head of the Buddha dated to about 750 AD and a 2000-year-old jade horse head from a burial. Other sculptures include life-size tomb guardians. Chinese decorative arts on display include Chinese lacquer, silk, Chinese porcelain, jade and cloisonné enamel. Two large ancestor portraits of a husband and wife painted in watercolour on silk date from the 18th century. There is a unique Chinese lacquerware table, made in the imperial workshops during the reign of the Xuande Emperor in the Ming dynasty. Examples of clothing are also displayed. One of the largest objects is a bed from the mid-17th century. The work of contemporary Chinese designers is also displayed.

The Toshiba gallery of Japanese art opened in December 1986. The majority of exhibits date from 1550 to 1900, but one of the oldest pieces displayed is the 13th-century sculpture of Amida Nyorai. Examples of classic Japanese armour from the mid-19th century, steel sword blades (Katana), Inrō, lacquerware including the Mazarin Chest dated c1640 is one of the finest surviving pieces from Kyoto, Imari porcelain, Netsuke, woodblock prints including the work of Andō Hiroshige, graphic works include printed books, as well as paintings, scrolls and screens, textiles and dress including kimono are some of the objects on display. Also displayed is Suzuki Chokichi's bronze incense burner (koro) dated 1875, at over 2.25 metres high and 1.25 metres in diameter it is also one of the largest examples made. The museum also holds some cloisonné pieces from the Japanese Ando Cloisonné Company production company.

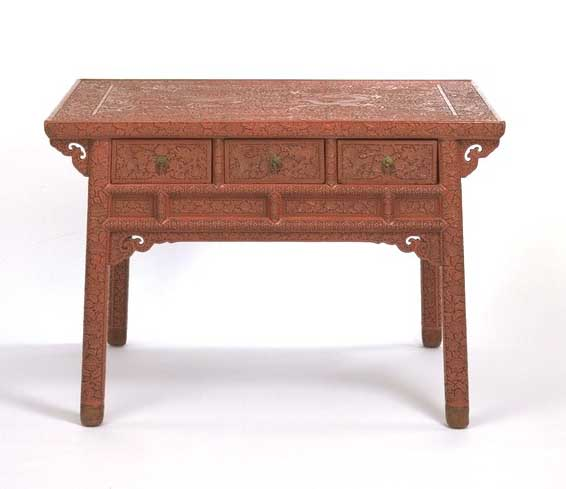
Lacquerware table, China, c. 1425–1436

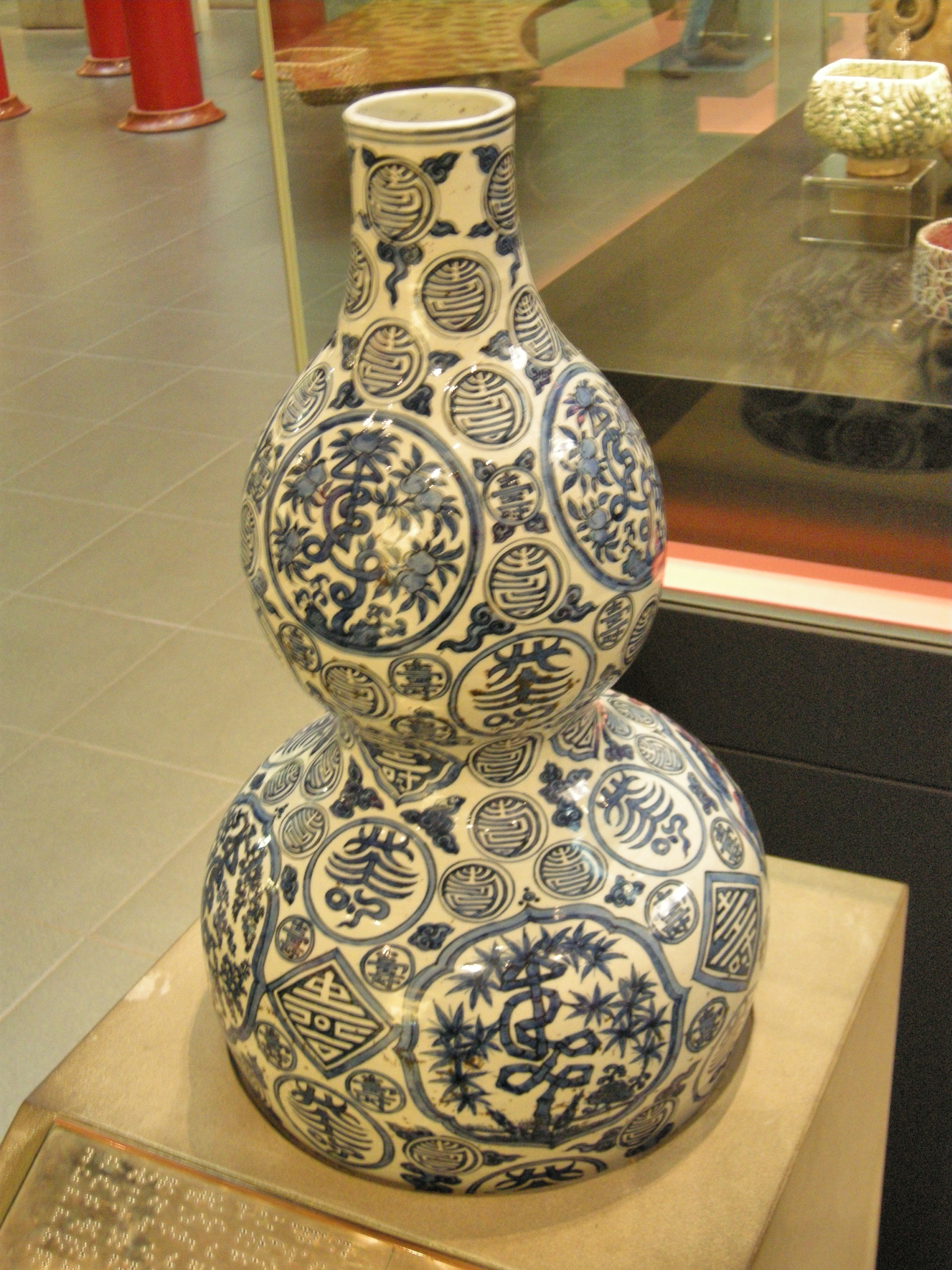
Chinese porcelain vase, Ming dynasty, c. 1550

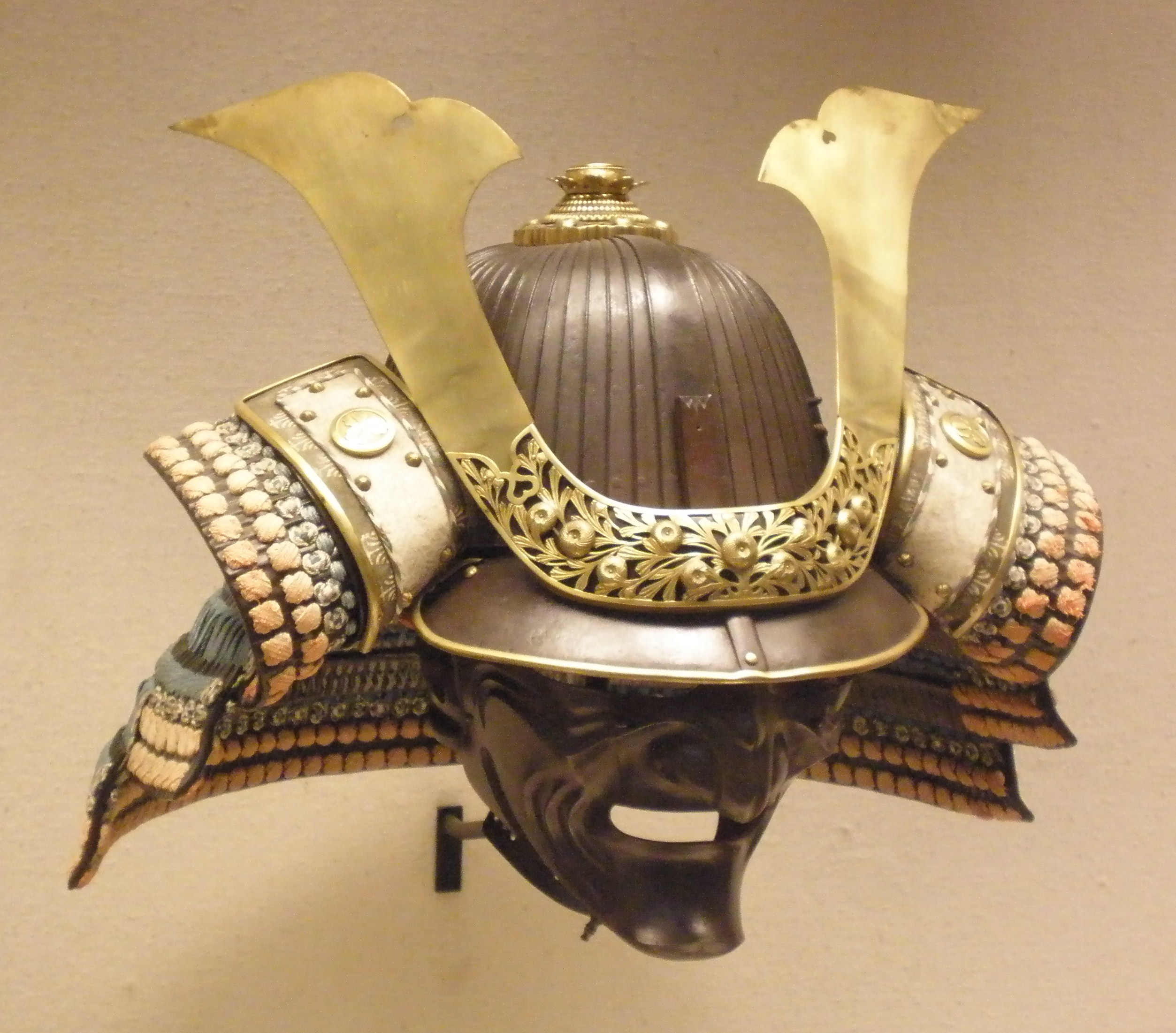
Iron half-mask, Japan, c. 1700–1850

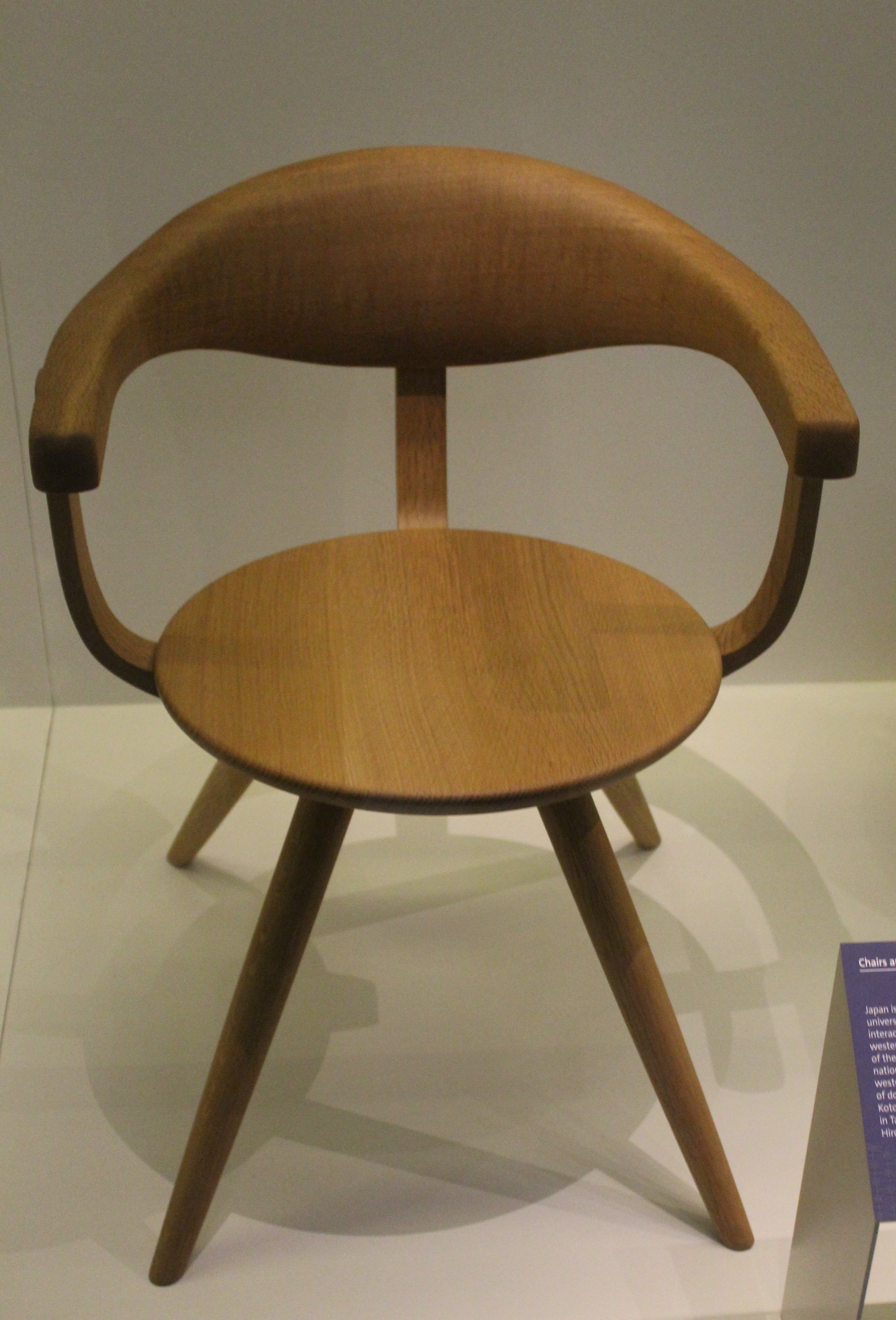
Oak armchair designed by Sori Yanagi, Japan, 1978

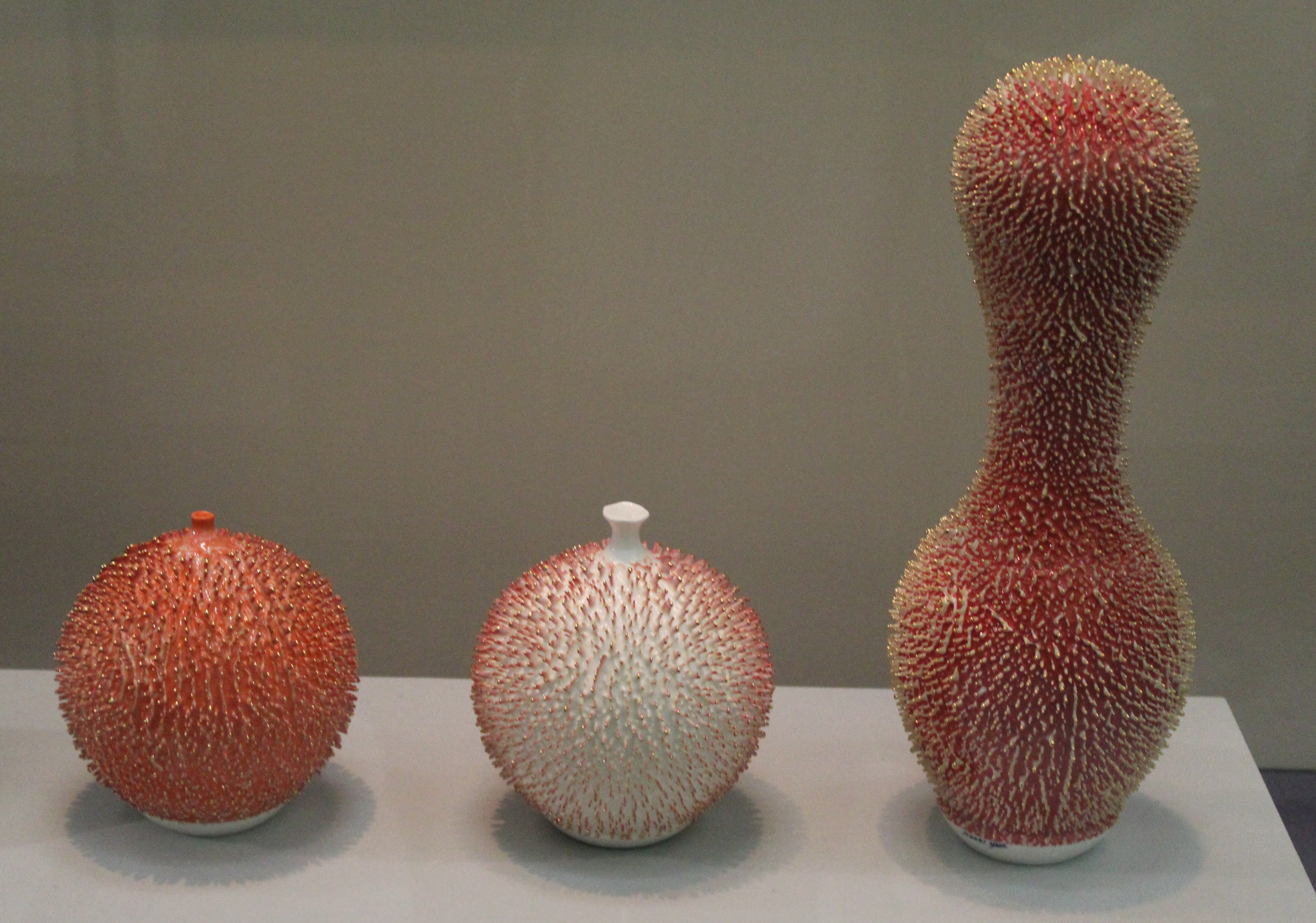
Porcelain vases by Yun Jucheol, Korea, 2015–2016

Smaller galleries cover Korea and the Himalayas. Korean displays include green-glazed ceramics, silk embroideries from officials' robes and gleaming boxes inlaid with mother-of-pearl made between 500 AD and 2000. Himalayan works include important early Nepalese bronze sculptures, repoussé work and embroidery. Tibetan art from the 14th to the 19th century is represented by 14th- and 15th-century religious images in wood and bronze, scroll paintings and ritual objects. Art from Thailand, Burma, Cambodia, Indonesia and Sri Lanka in gold, silver, bronze, stone, terracotta and ivory represents these rich and complex cultures, the displays span the 6th to 19th centuries. Refined Hindu and Buddhist sculptures reflect the influence of India; items on the show include betel-nut cutters, ivory combs and bronze palanquin hooks.

=== Books ===
The South Kensington building houses the National Art Library, a public library containing over 750,000 books, photographs, drawings, paintings and prints. It is one of the world's largest libraries dedicated to the study of fine and decorative arts. The library includes special collections covering illuminated manuscripts, rare books and artists' letters and archives. The library consists of three large public rooms, with around a hundred individual study desks.

One of the great treasures in the library is the Codex Forster, one of Leonardo da Vinci's note books. The Codex consists of three parchment-bound manuscripts, Forster I, Forster II, and Forster III, quite small in size, dated between 1490 and 1505. Their contents include a large collection of sketches and references to the equestrian sculpture commissioned by the Duke of Milan Ludovico Sforza to commemorate his father Francesco Sforza. These were bequeathed with over 18,000 books to the museum in 1876 by John Forster.

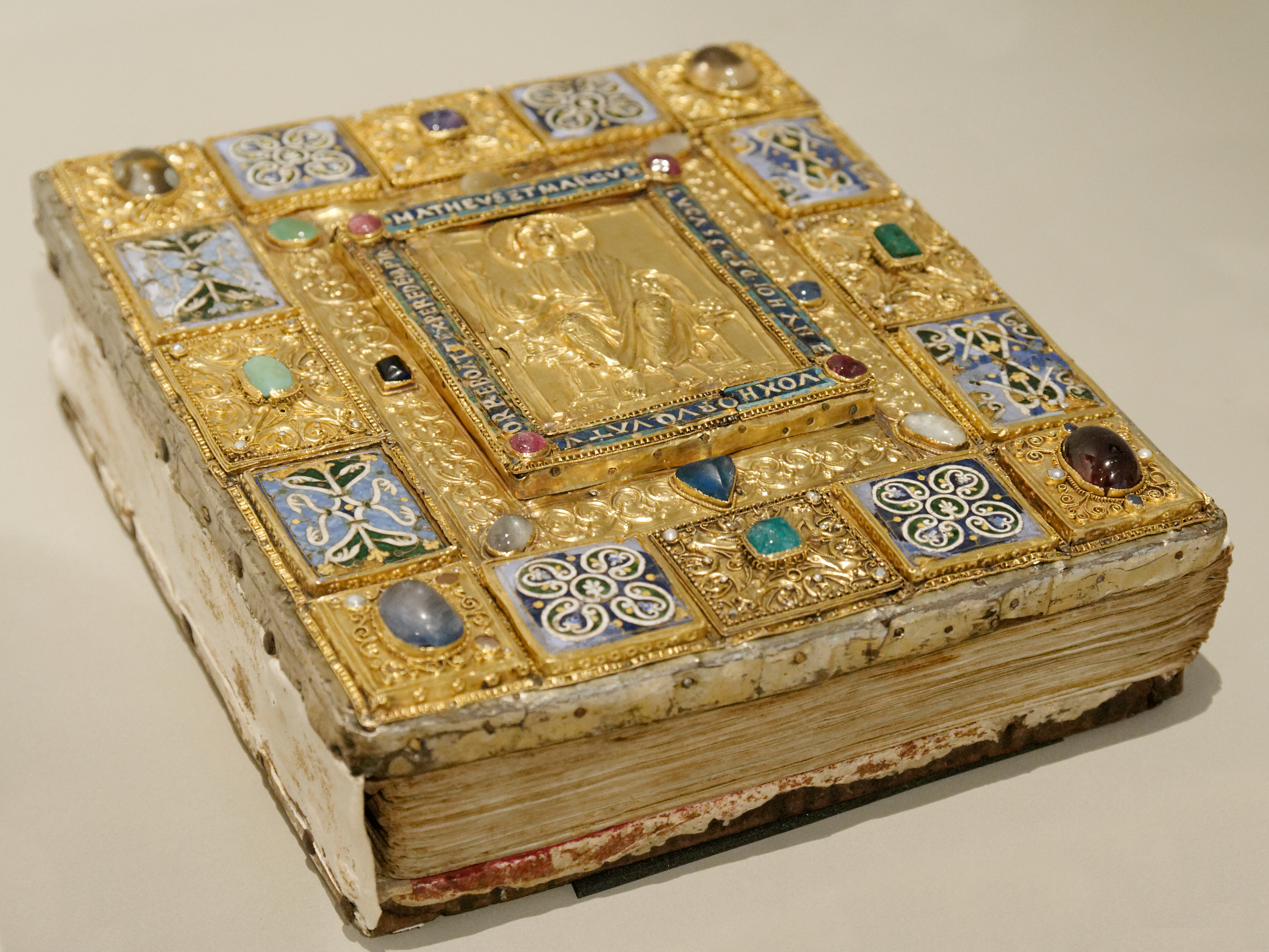
Sion Gospels, Germanay c. 1140–1150

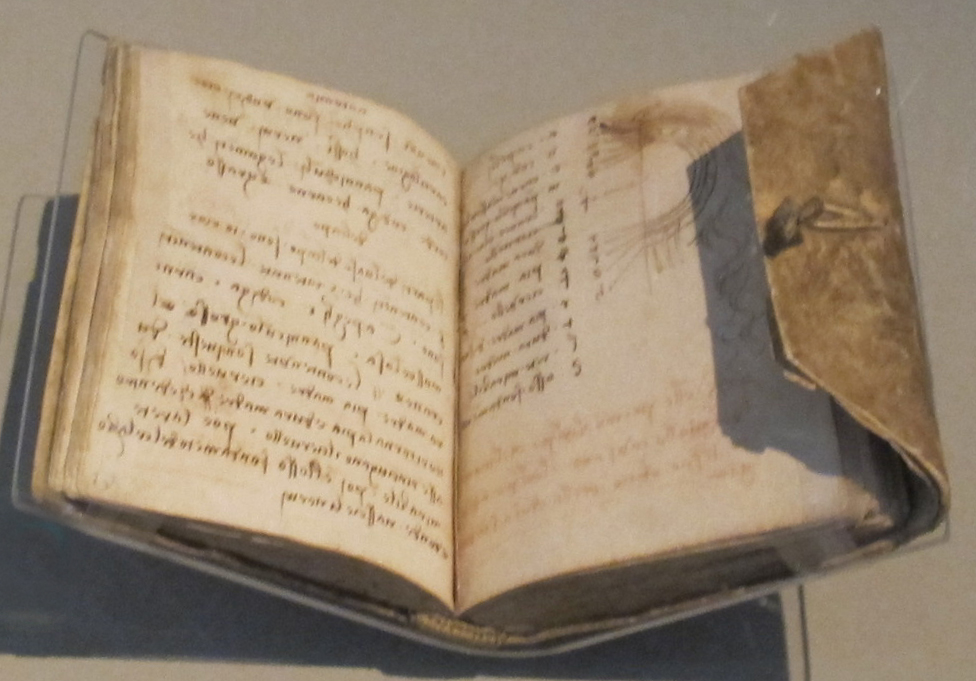
Leonardo da Vinci, Codex Forster III, c. 1490–1505 (Room 64)

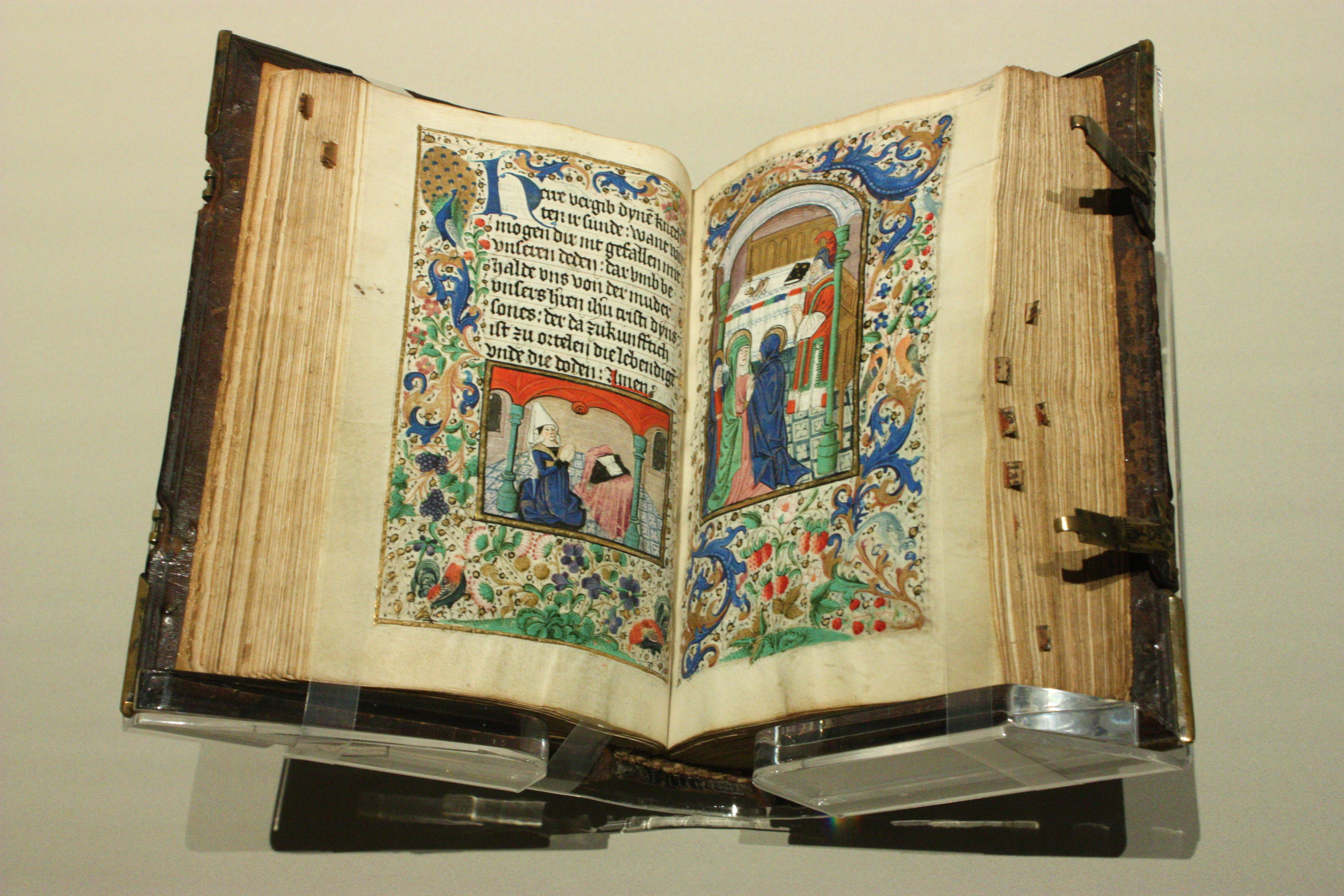
BLW Manuscript Book of Hours, c. 1480–1490

The Reverend Alexander Dyce donated over 14,000 books to the museum in 1869. His donation included early editions, in Greek and Latin, of the poets and playwrights Aeschylus, Aristotle, Homer, Livy, Ovid, Pindar, Sophocles and Virgil. More recent authors include Giovanni Boccaccio, Dante, Racine, Rabelais and Molière.

Illuminated manuscripts in the library dating from the 12th to 16th centuries include: a leaf from the Eadwine Psalter, Canterbury; Pocket Book of Hours, Reims; Missal from the Royal Basilica of Saint Denis, Paris; the Simon Marmion Book of Hours, Bruges; 1524 Charter illuminated by Lucas Horenbout, London; the Armagnac manuscript of the trial and rehabilitation of Joan of Arc, Rouen.

Victorian authors represented include Charles Dickens, by the manuscripts of most of his novels; Beatrix Potter, with the largest collection of her original manuscripts in the world and William Morris.

The National Art Library also includes a collection of comics and comic art. This collection include the Krazy Kat Arkive, comprising 4,200 comics, and the Rakoff Collection, comprising 17,000 pieces collected by the writer and editor, Ian Rakoff.

In the early 2000s the National Art Library merged with the Prints, Paintings and Drawings department to form the Word and Image Department. In 2007 the department began a large scale digitisation project, the Factory Project, to completely digitise the collection. The project began by taking digital photographs of each item to replace the collection of old black and white photos. Those new photographs will be accessible on-line. 15,000 images were taken during the first year of the project, including of drawings, watercolours, computer-generated art, photographs, posters and woodcuts. The next step of the project is to catalogue everything and audit the collection to ensure every item listed as being in the collection was physically found during the project. In addition items needing conservation were identified and treated.

=== British galleries ===
These fifteen galleries, which opened in November 2001, contain around 4,000 objects and are based around three major themes: "Style", "Who Led Taste" and "What Was New". The period covered is 1500 to 1900, with the galleries divided into three major subdivisions:

- Tudor and Stuart Britain, 1500–1714, covering the Renaissance, Elizabethan, Jacobean, Restoration and Baroque styles
- Georgian Britain, 1714–1837, covering Palladianism, Rococo, Chinoiserie, Neoclassicism, the Regency, the influence of Chinese, Indian and Egyptian styles, and the early Gothic Revival
- Victorian Britain, 1837–1901, covering the later phases of the Gothic Revival, French influences, Classical and Renaissance revivals, Aestheticism, Japanese style, the continuing influence of China, India, and the Islamic world, the Arts and Crafts movement and the Scottish School.

Also on display are works produced by European artists that was purchased or commissioned by British patrons, as well as imports from Asia, including porcelain, cloth and wallpaper. Designers and artists whose work is on display include Gian Lorenzo Bernini, Grinling Gibbons, Daniel Marot, Louis Laguerre, Antonio Verrio, Sir James Thornhill, William Kent, Robert Adam, Josiah Wedgwood, Matthew Boulton, Canova, Thomas Chippendale, Pugin, William Morris. Patrons who have influenced taste are also represented by works of art from their collections, these include: Horace Walpole (a major influence on the Gothic Revival), William Thomas Beckford and Thomas Hope.

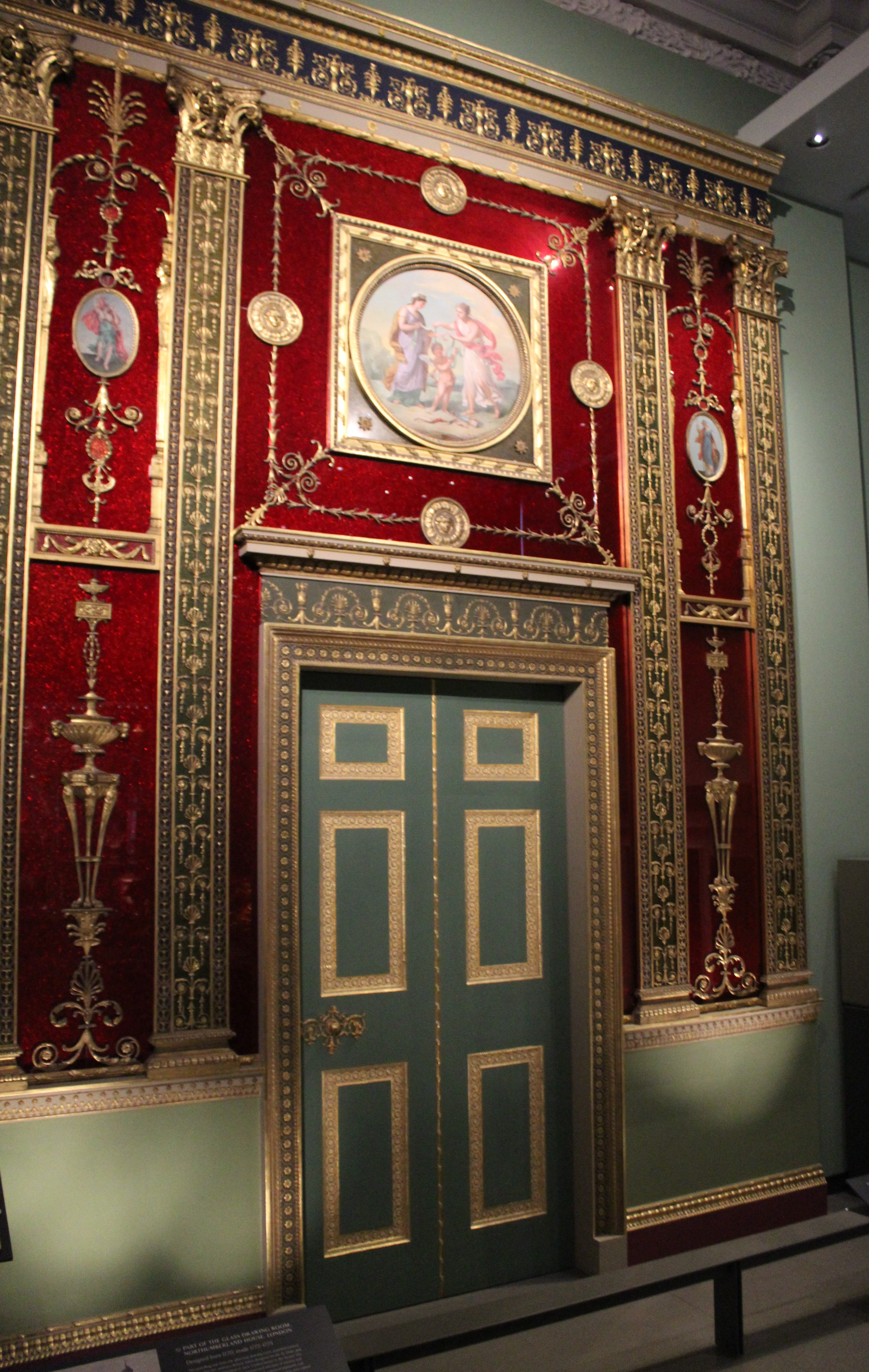
Part of the Glass Drawing Room from Northumberland House

The galleries showcase a number of complete and partial period rooms, from demolished buildings, including:

- The parlour from 2 Henrietta Street, London, dated 1727–1728, designed by James Gibbs
- The Norfolk House Music Room, St James Square, London, dated 1756, designed by Matthew Brettingham and Giovanni Battista Borra
- Part of a wall from the Glass Drawing-Room of Northumberland House, dated 1773–1775, designed by Robert Adam

Some of the more notable works displayed in the galleries include:

- Pietro Torrigiani's coloured terracotta bust of Henry VII, dated 1509–1511
- Henry VIII's writing desk, dated 1525, made from walnut and oak, lined with leather and painted and gilded with the king's coat of arms
- A spinet dated 1570–1580, made for Elizabeth I
- The Great Bed of Ware, dated 1590–1600, a large, elaborately carved four-poster bed with marquetry headboard
- Gianlorenzo Bernini's bust of Thomas Baker, from the 1630s
- 17th-century tapestries from the Sheldon and Mortlake Tapestry Works
- The wood relief of The Stoning of St Stephen, dated c. 1670, by Grinling Gibbons
- The Macclesfield Wine Set, dated 1719–1720, made by Anthony Nelme, the only complete set known to survive.
- The life-size sculpture of George Frederick Handel, dated 1738, by Louis-François Roubiliac
- Furniture by Thomas Chippendale and Robert Adam
- The sculpture of Bashaw, dated 1831–1834, by Matthew Cotes Wyatt
- Aesthetic and Arts & Crafts furniture by Edward William Godwin and Charles Rennie Mackintosh; and carpets and interior textiles by William Morris.
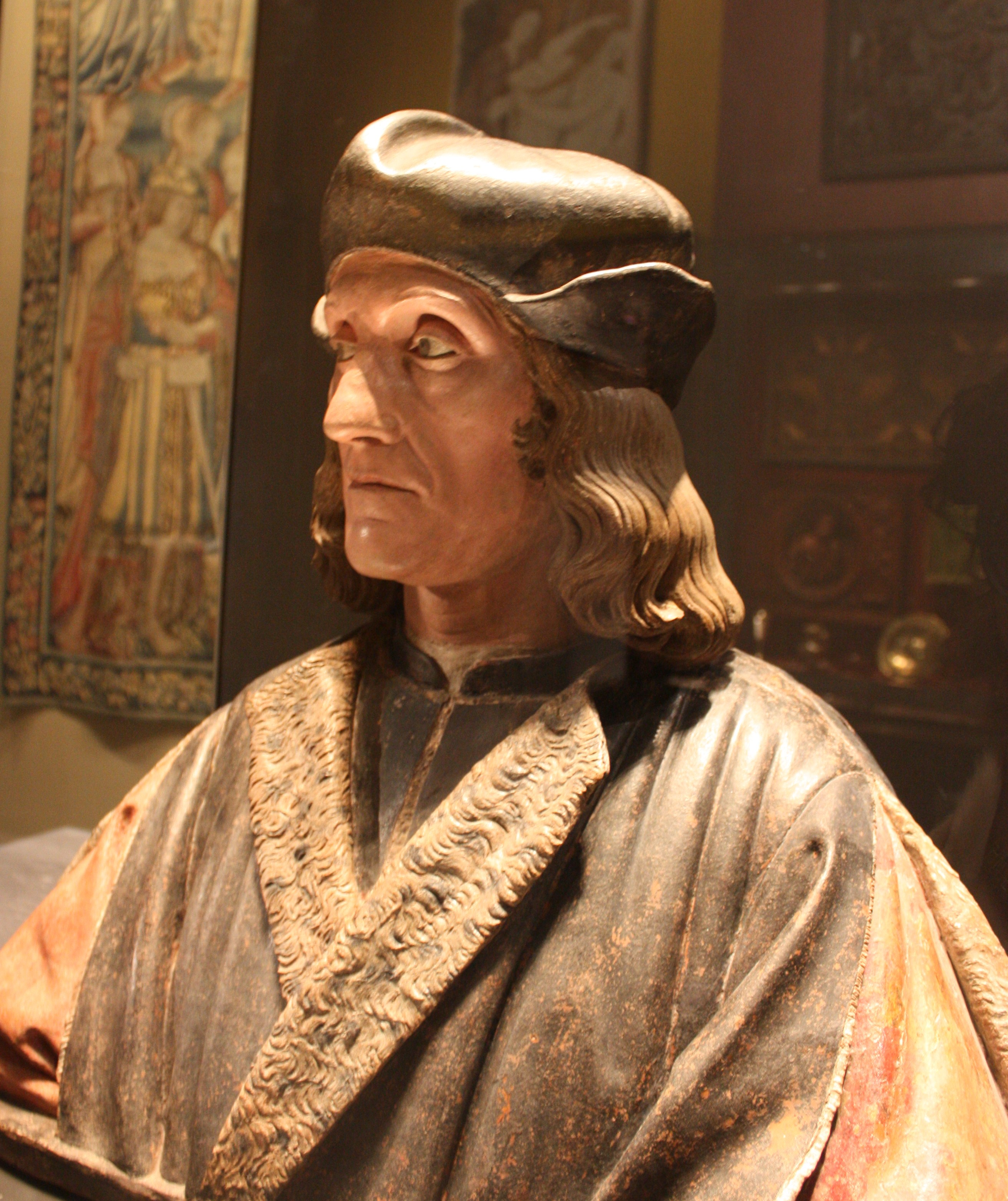
Pietro Torrigiani's bust of Henry VII

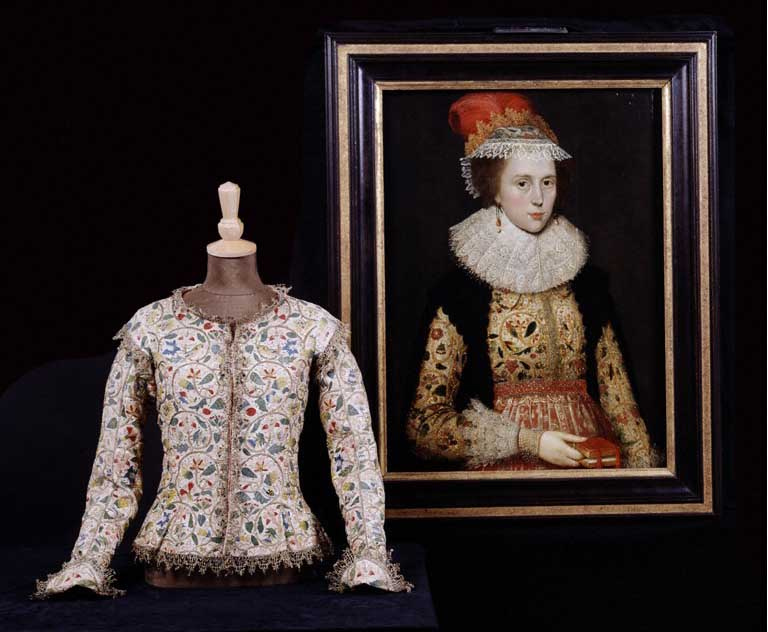
Jacket and portrait of Margaret Layton, c. 1610

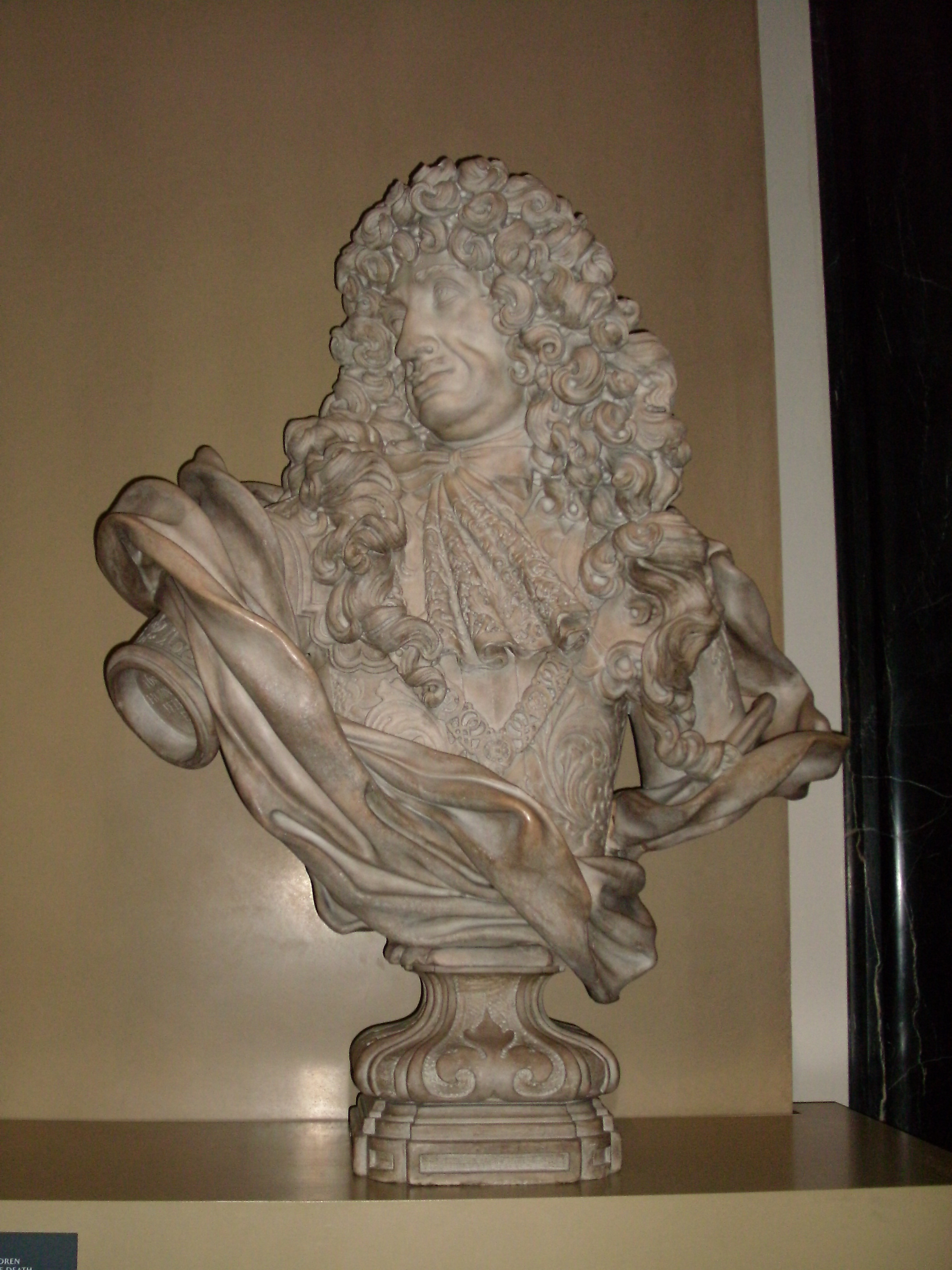
Honoré Pelle's bust of Charles II

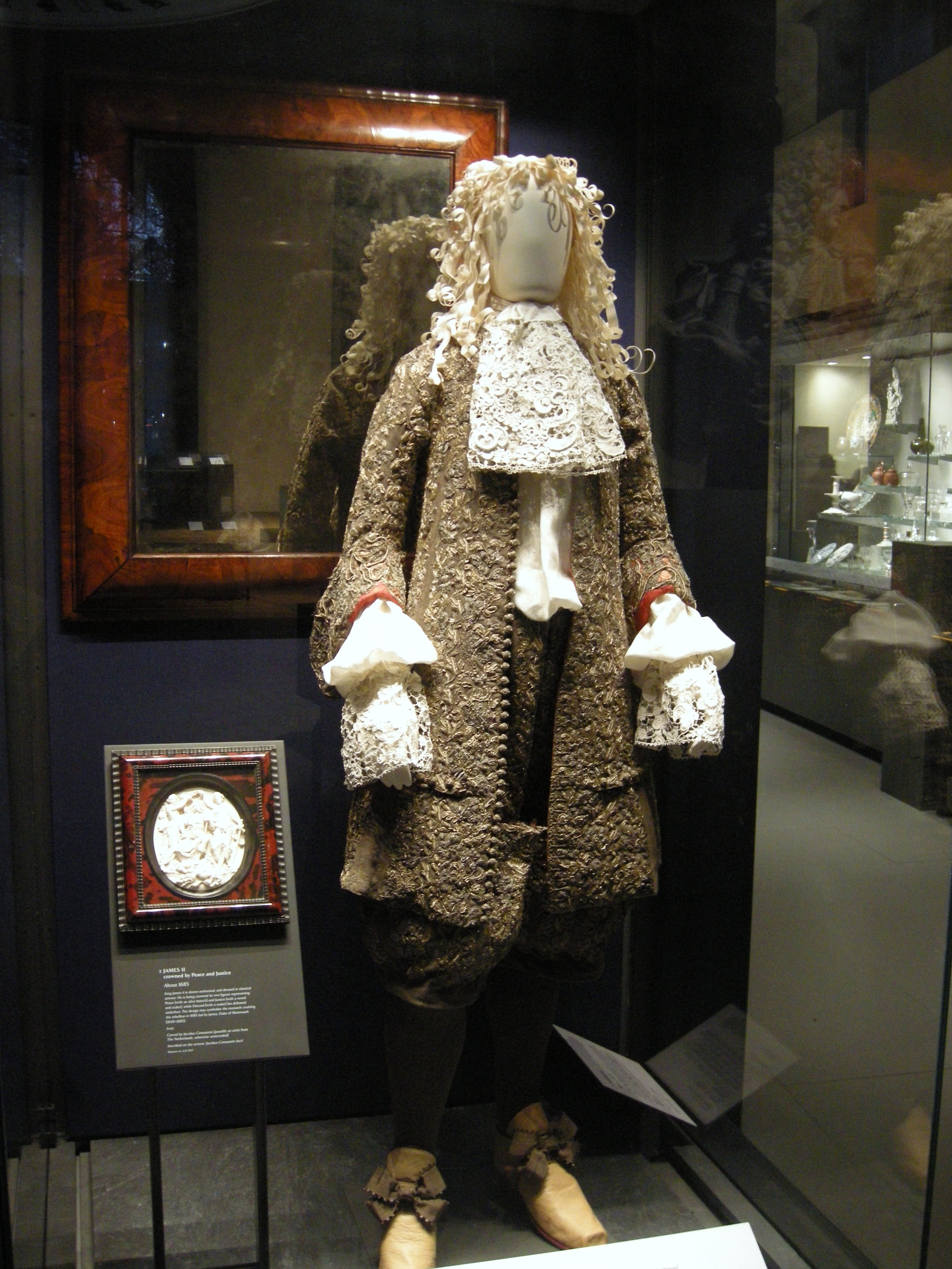
James II's wedding suit

The galleries also link design to wider trends in British culture. For instance, design in the Tudor period was influenced by the spread of printed books and the work of European artists and craftsmen employed in Britain. In the Stuart period, increasing trade, especially with Asia, enabled wider access to luxuries like carpets, lacquered furniture, silks and porcelain. In the Georgian age there was an increasing emphasis on entertainment and leisure. For example, the increase in tea drinking led to the production of tea paraphernalia such as china and caddies. European styles are seen on the Grand Tour also influenced taste. As the Industrial Revolution took hold, the growth of mass production produced entrepreneurs such as Josiah Wedgwood, Matthew Boulton and Eleanor Coade. In the Victorian era new technology and machinery had a significant effect on manufacturing, and for the first time since the reformation, the Anglican and Roman Catholic Churches had a major effect on art and design such as the Gothic Revival. There is a display of items purchased from the Great Exhibition. In the later 19th century, the increasing backlash against industrialisation, led by John Ruskin, contributed to the Arts and Crafts movement.

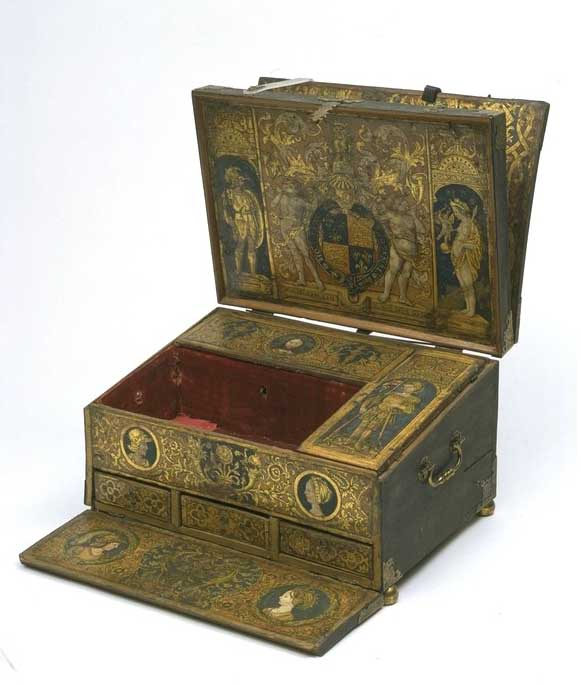
Henry VIII's writing box

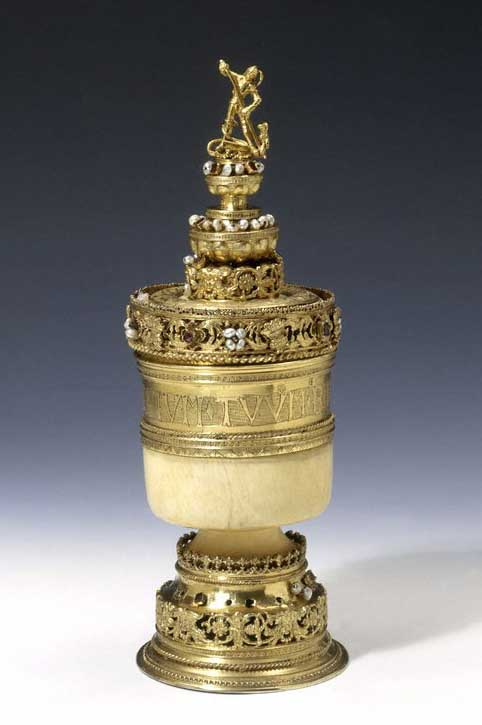
Howard Grace Cup

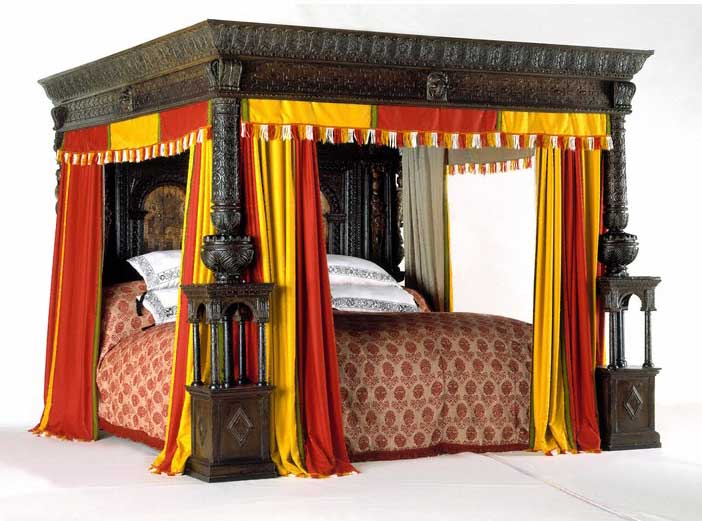
Great Bed of Ware

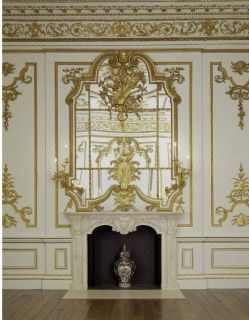
Norfolk House Music Room

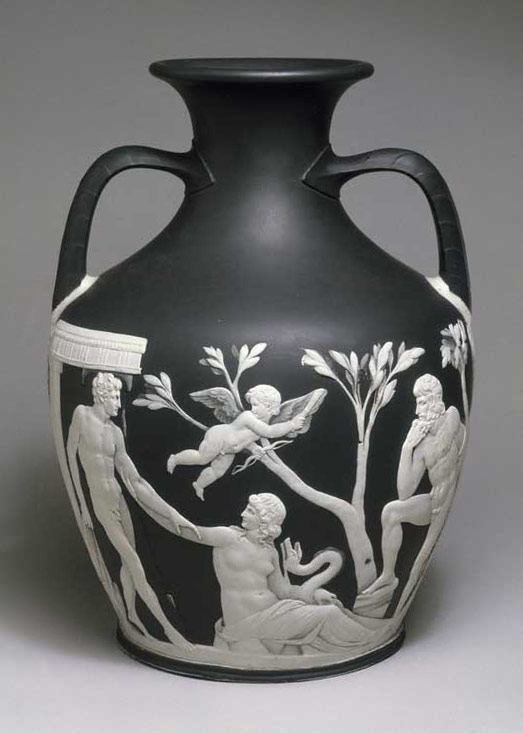
Wedgwood Portland Vase

=== Ceramics ===
This is the largest and most comprehensive ceramics collection in the world, with over 80,000 objects. Every populated continent is represented. Much of the top floor of the South Kensington site is devoted to galleries of ceramics. These spaces include display cases with a representative selection and also massed "visible storage" displays of the reserve collection.

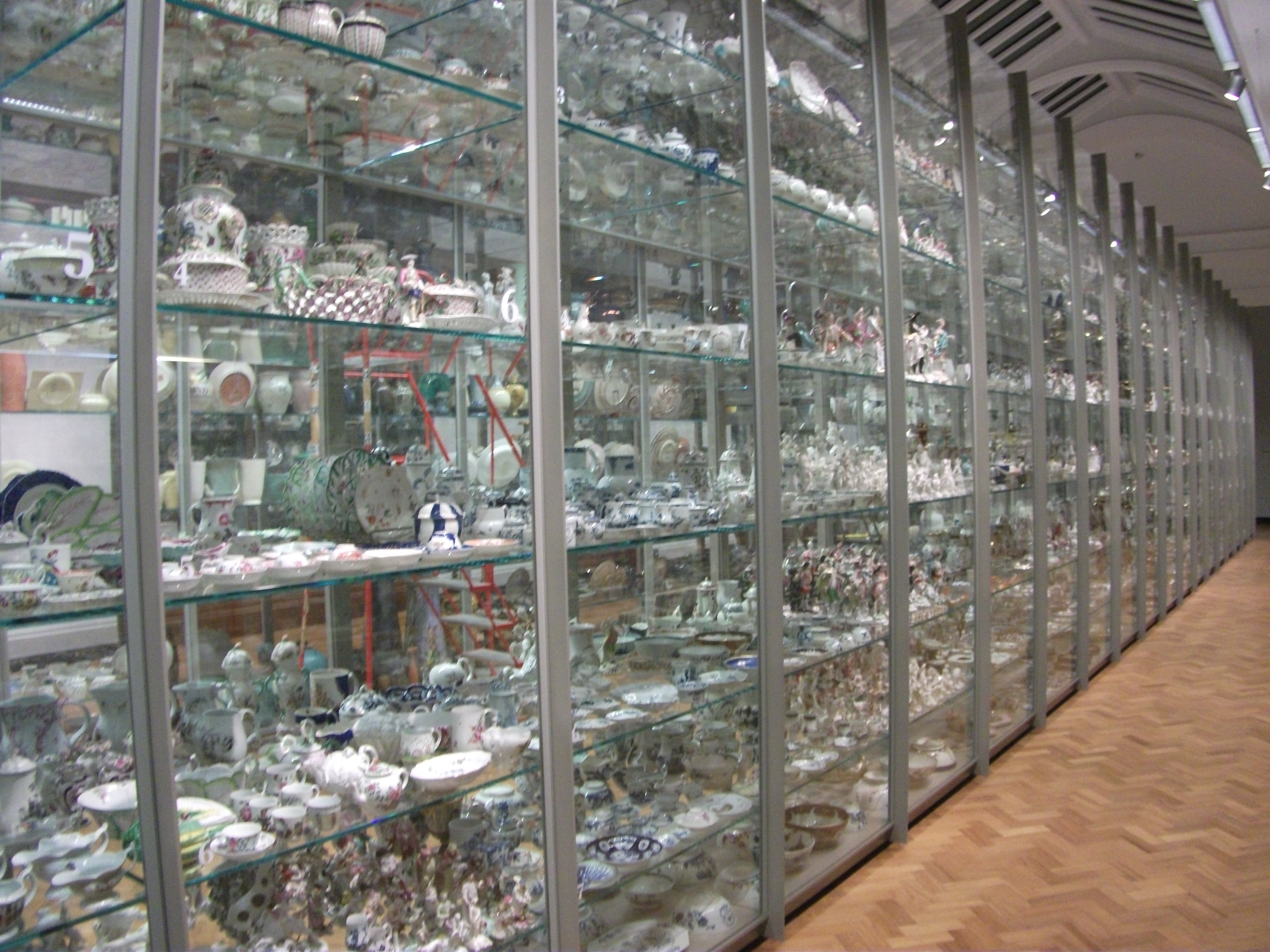

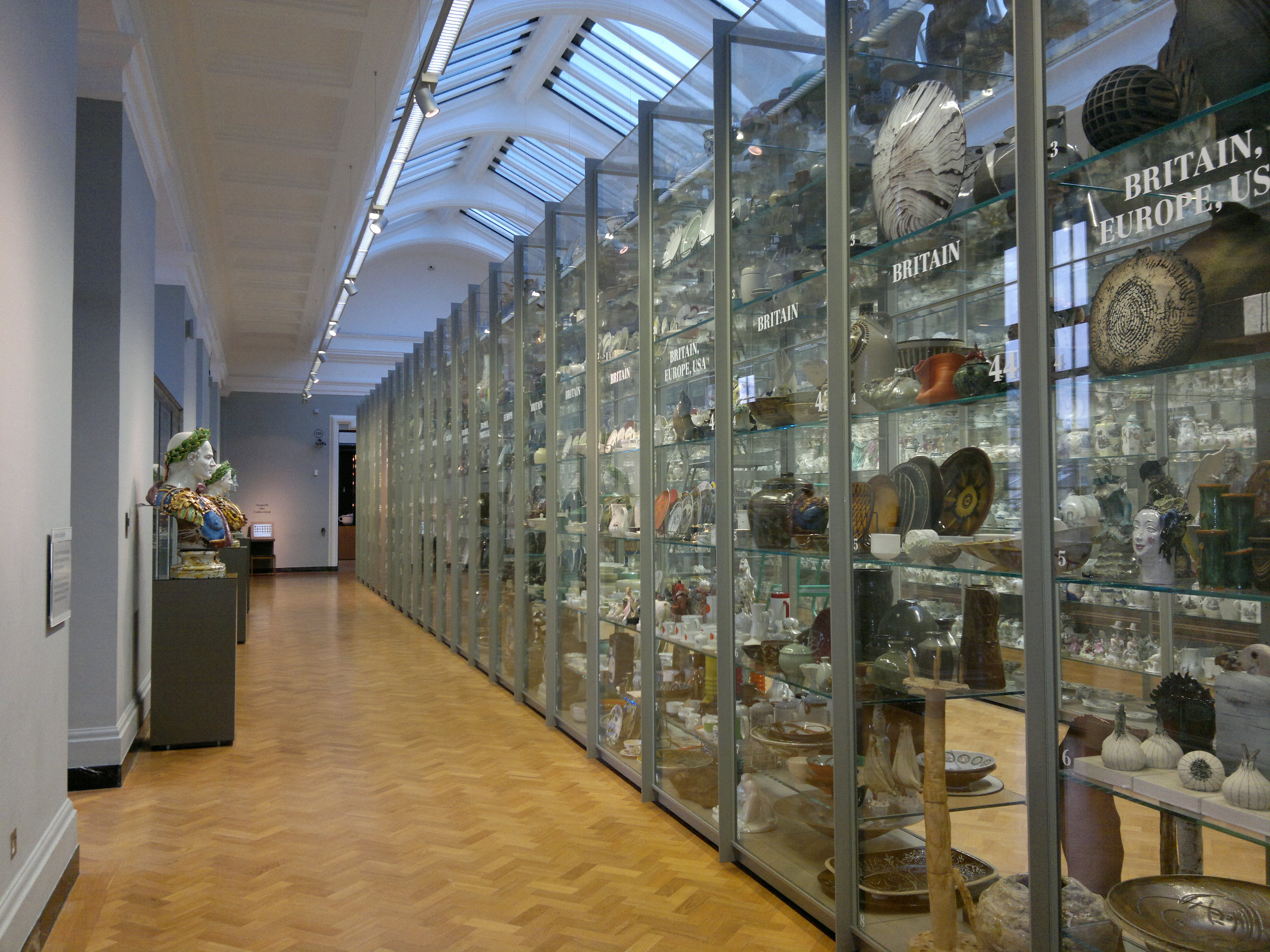
Ceramic galleries, Victoria & Albert Museum

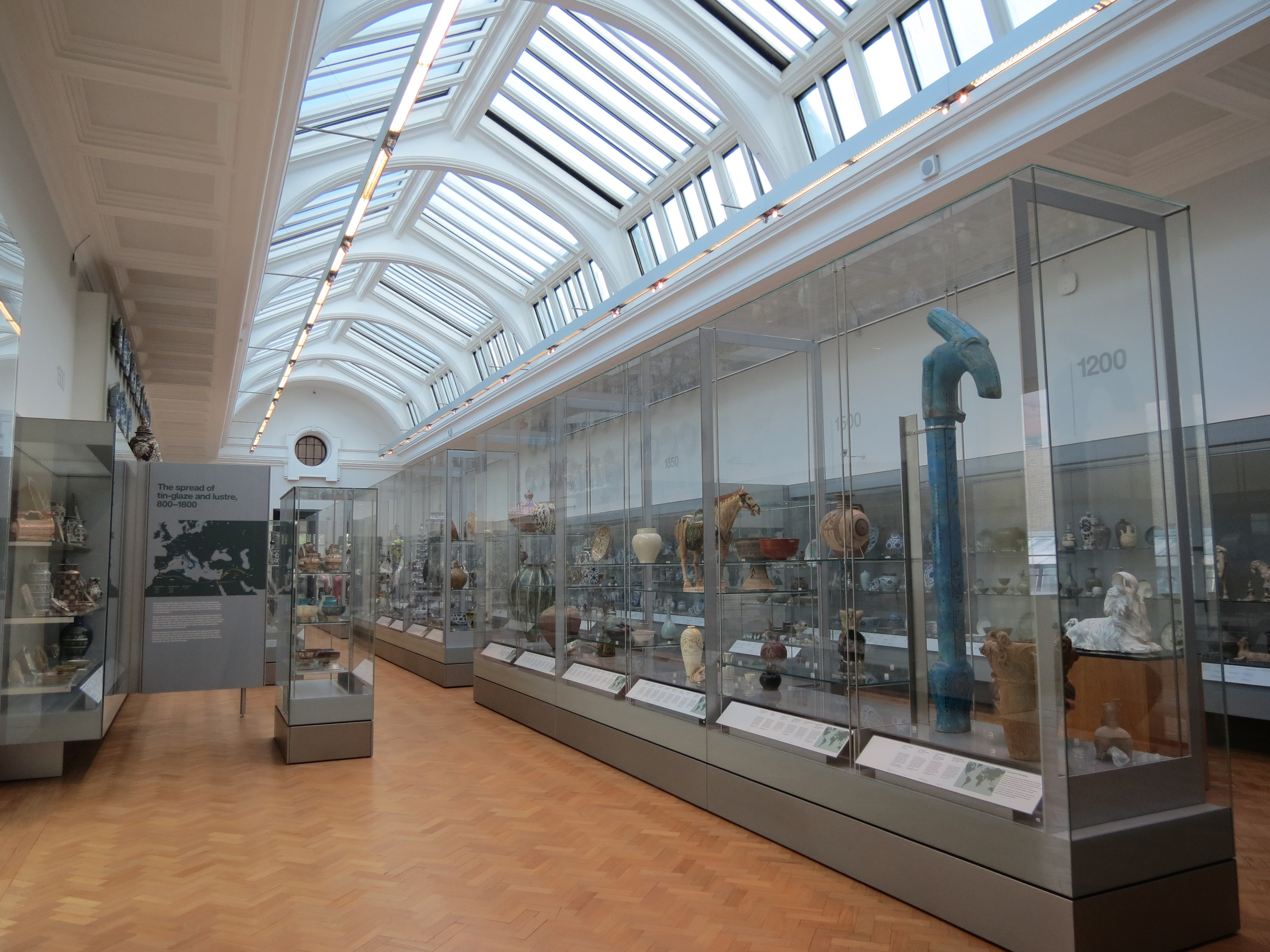

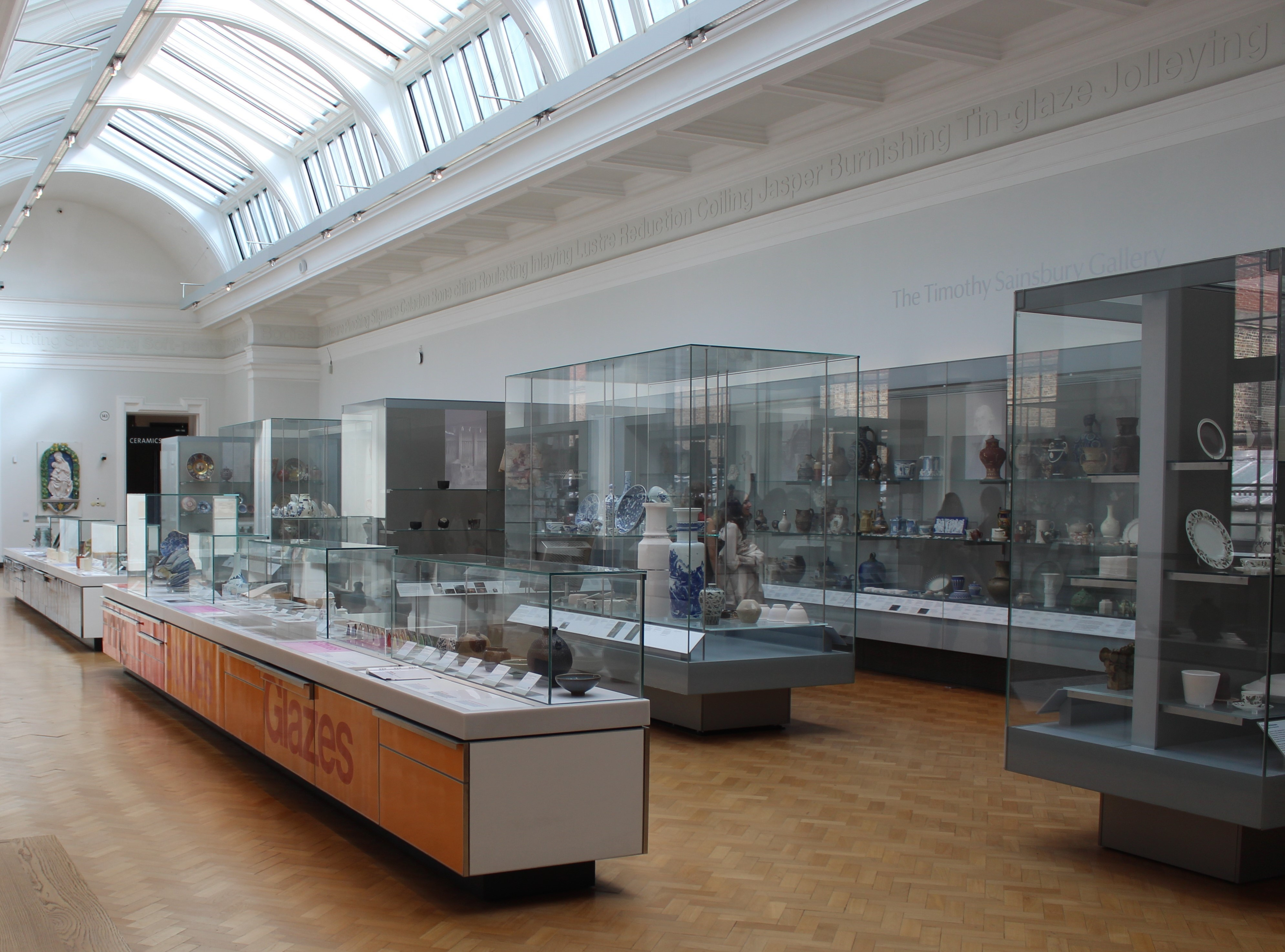

Well represented in the collection is Meissen porcelain, with examples displayed include the Meissen Vulture from 1731 and the Möllendorff Dinner Service of 1762. Ceramics from the Manufacture nationale de Sèvres are extensive, especially from the 18th and 19th centuries. The collection of 18th-century British porcelain is the largest and finest in the world. Examples from every factory are represented, the collections of Chelsea porcelain and Worcester porcelain being especially fine. All the major 19th-century British factories are also represented. The Salting Bequest in 1909 enriched the museum's stock of Chinese and Japanese ceramics and forms part of the finest collection of East Asian pottery and porcelain in the world, including Kakiemon ware.

Many famous potters, such as Josiah Wedgwood, William De Morgan and Bernard Leach as well as Mintons & Royal Doulton are represented in the collection. There is an extensive collection of Delftware produced in both Britain and Holland, which includes a c. 1695 flower pyramid over a metre in height. Bernard Palissy has several examples of his work in the collection including dishes, jugs and candlesticks. The largest objects in the collection are a series of elaborately ornamented ceramic stoves from the 16th and 17th centuries, made in Germany and Switzerland. There is an unrivalled collection of Italian maiolica and Spanish lustreware. The collection of Iznik pottery from Turkey is the largest in the world.

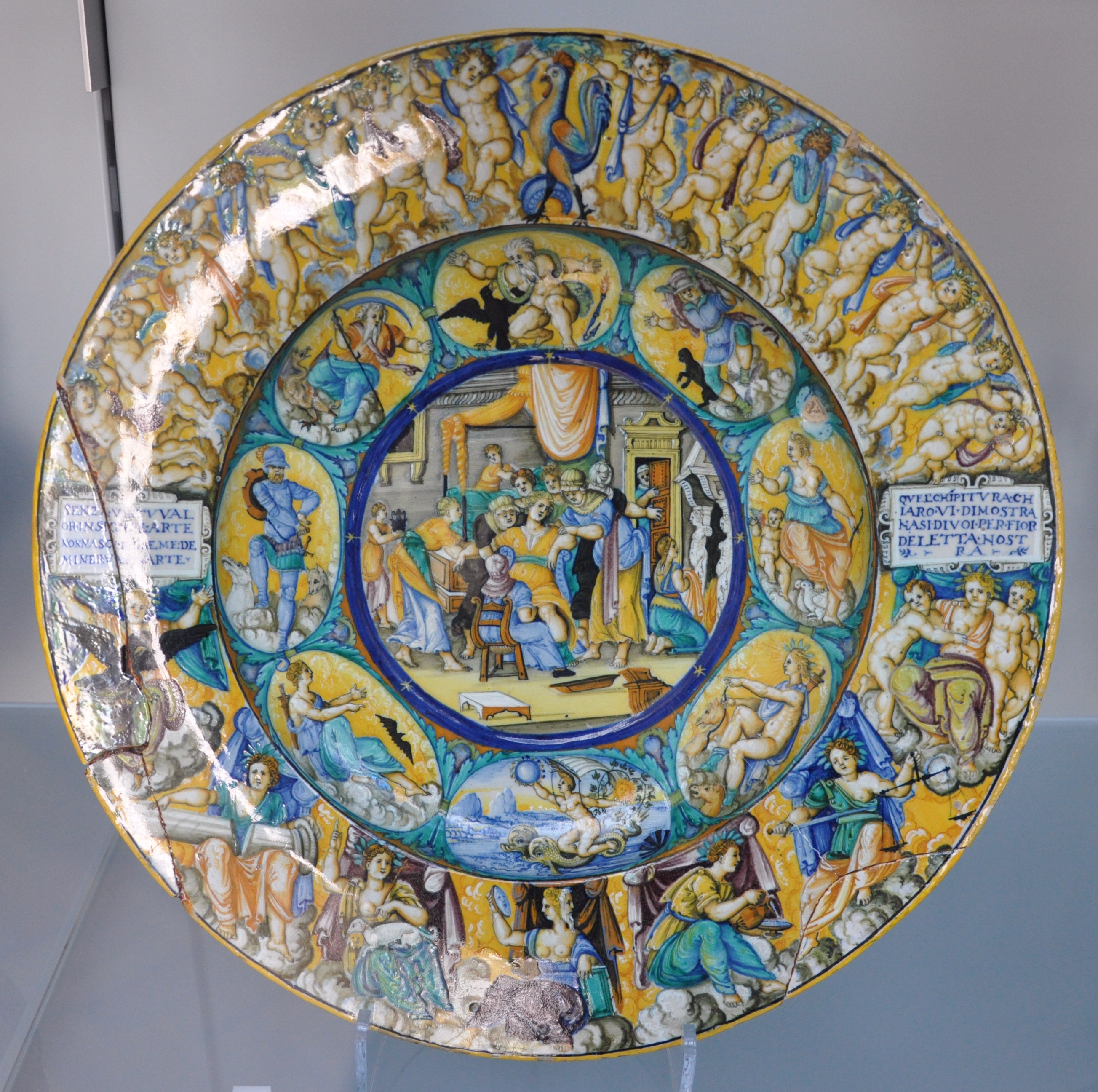
Maiolica dish with a childbirth scene, Urbino, c. 1546

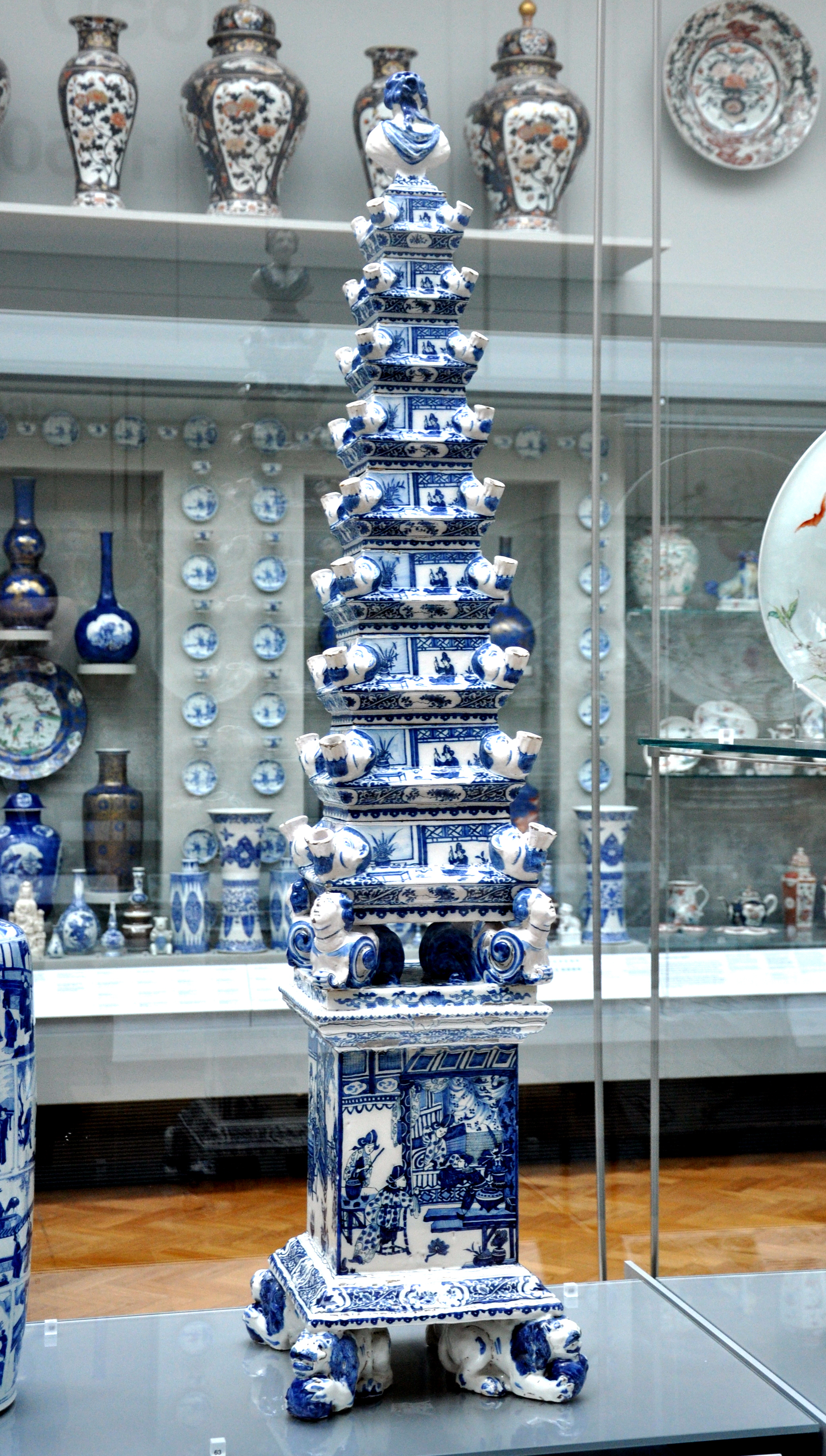
Flower pyramid, Delft, c. 1695

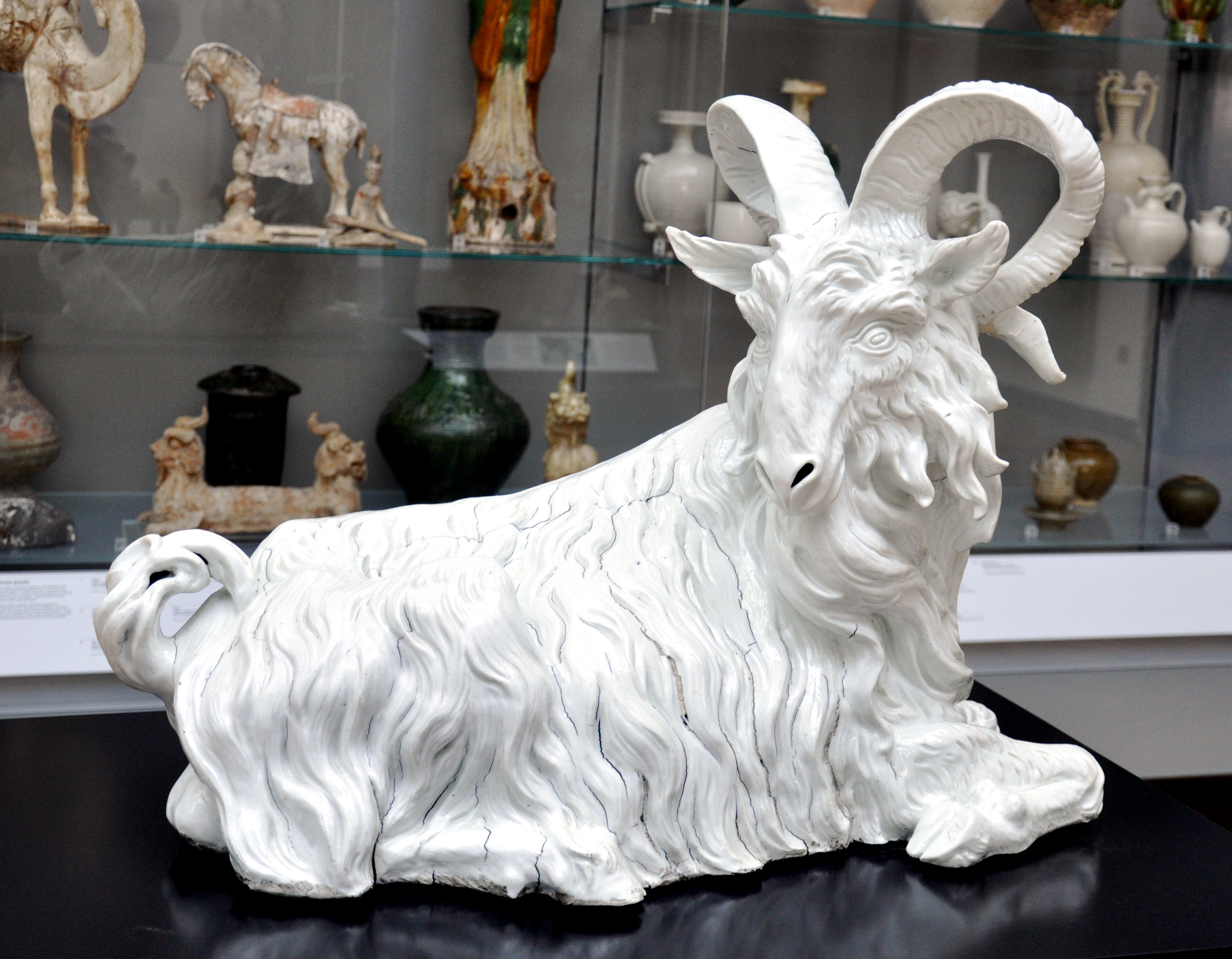
Meissen porcelain billy goat figure c. 1732

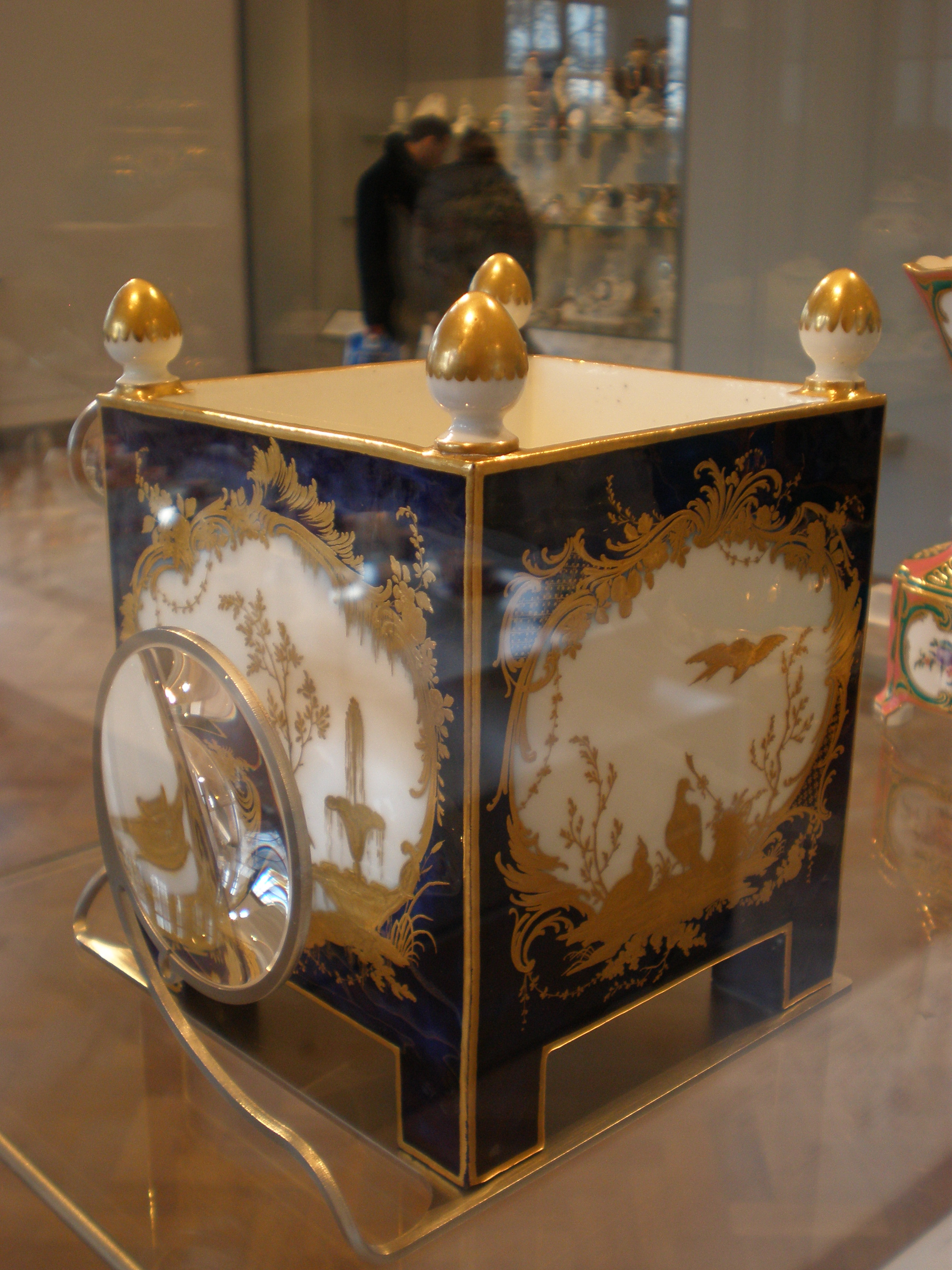
Jardinière (plant pot), Vincennes porcelain, France; 1750–53

=== Glass ===
The glass collection covers 4000 years of glassmaking, and has over 6000 pieces from Africa, Britain, Europe, America and Asia. The earliest glassware on display comes from Ancient Egypt. Further displays feature glass from Ancient Rome plus Medieval and Renaissance Europe including both Venetian glass and Bohemian glass. More recent periods represented include Art Nouveau glass by Louis Comfort Tiffany and Émile Gallé and Art Deco works by René Lalique. There are many examples of crystal chandeliers, both English, displayed in the British galleries, and foreign – for example, a Venetian one attributed to Giuseppe Briati and dated to about 1750.

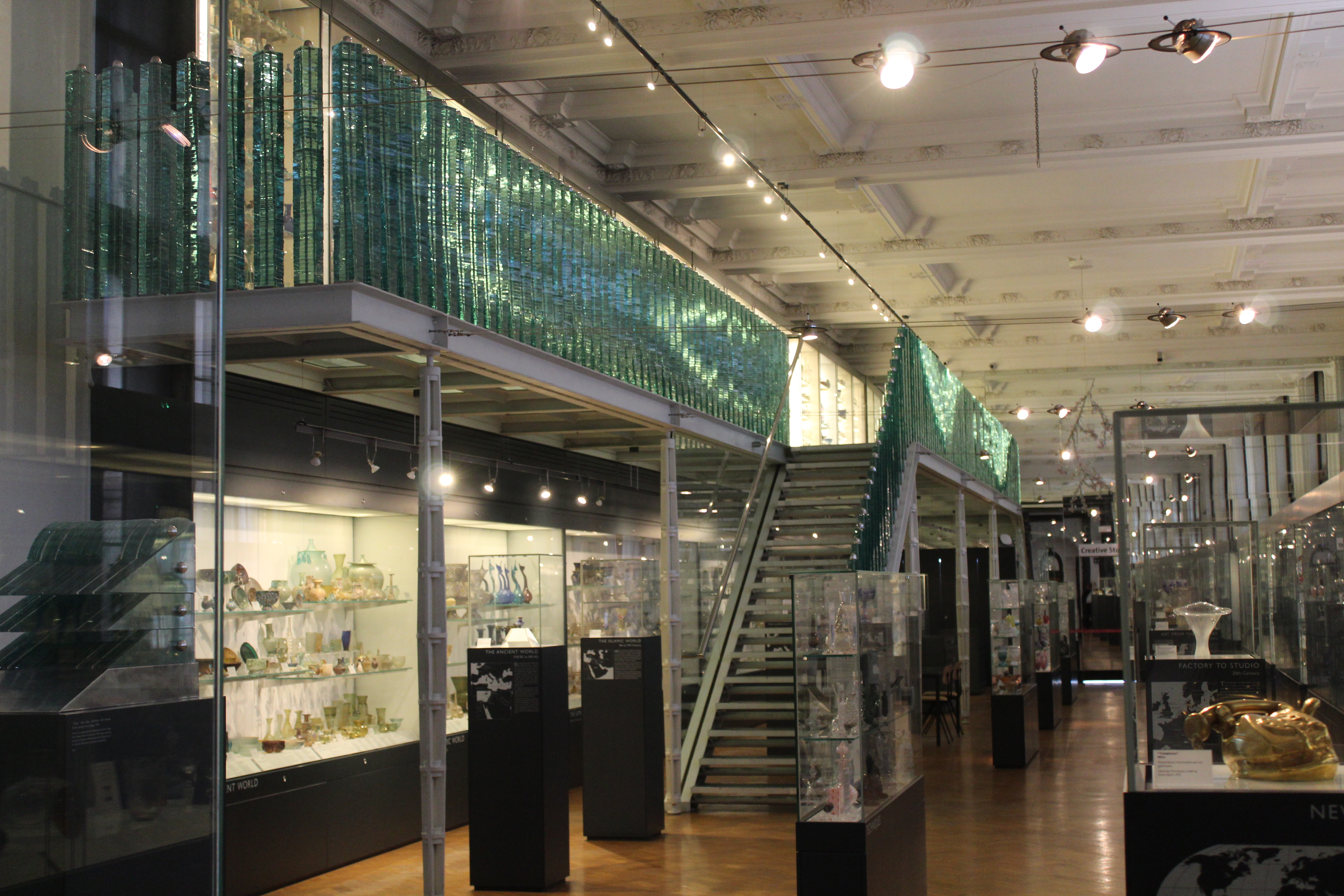
Room 131, the main glass gallery

The stained glass collection is possibly the finest in the world, covering the medieval to modern periods, and covering Europe as well as Britain. Several examples of English 16th-century heraldic glass is displayed in the British Galleries. Many well-known designers of stained glass are represented in the collection including, from the 19th century: Dante Gabriel Rossetti, Edward Burne-Jones and William Morris. There is also an example of Frank Lloyd Wright's work in the collection. Notable designers of the 20th-century represented include Harry Clarke, John Piper, Patrick Reyntiens, Veronica Whall and Brian Clarke.

The main glass gallery at South Kensington was redesigned in 1994, the glass balustrade on the staircase and mezzanine are the work of Danny Lane, the gallery covering contemporary glass opened in 2004 and the sacred silver and stained-glass gallery in 2005. In this latter gallery stained glass is displayed alongside silverware from the 12th century to the present. Stained glass, dated 1243–1248, from the Sainte-Chapelle, is displayed in the Medieval & Renaissance galleries, where the important 13th-century glass beaker known as the Luck of Edenhall is also on display.

=== Prints and drawings ===
Prints and drawings from the over 750,000 works in the collection can be seen on request at the print room, the "Prints and Drawings study Room"; booking an appointment is necessary. The collection of drawings includes over 10,000 British and 2,000 old master works, including works by: Dürer, Giovanni Benedetto Castiglione, Bernardo Buontalenti, Rembrandt, Antonio Verrio, Paul Sandby, John Russell, Angelica Kauffman, John Flaxman, Hugh Douglas Hamilton, Thomas Rowlandson, William Kilburn, Thomas Girtin, Jean-Auguste-Dominique Ingres, David Wilkie, John Martin, Samuel Palmer, Sir Edwin Henry Landseer, Lord Leighton, Sir Samuel Luke Fildes and Aubrey Beardsley. Modern British artists represented in the collection include: Paul Nash, Percy Wyndham Lewis, Eric Gill, Stanley Spencer, John Piper, Robert Priseman, Graham Sutherland, Lucian Freud and David Hockney.

The print collection has more than 500,000 objects, covering: posters, greetings cards, bookplates, as well as a comprehensive collection of old master prints from the Renaissance to the present, including works by Rembrandt, William Hogarth, Giovanni Battista Piranesi, Canaletto, Karl Friedrich Schinkel, Henri Matisse and Sir William Nicholson.

=== Furniture ===
In November 2012, the museum opened its first gallery to be exclusively dedicated to furniture. Prior to this, furniture had been exhibited as part of a greater period context, rather than in isolation to showcase its design and construction merits. Among the designers showcased in the new gallery were Ron Arad, John Henry Belter, Joe Colombo, Eileen Gray, Grete Jalk, Verner Panton, Pierre Paulin, Thonet and Frank Lloyd Wright.

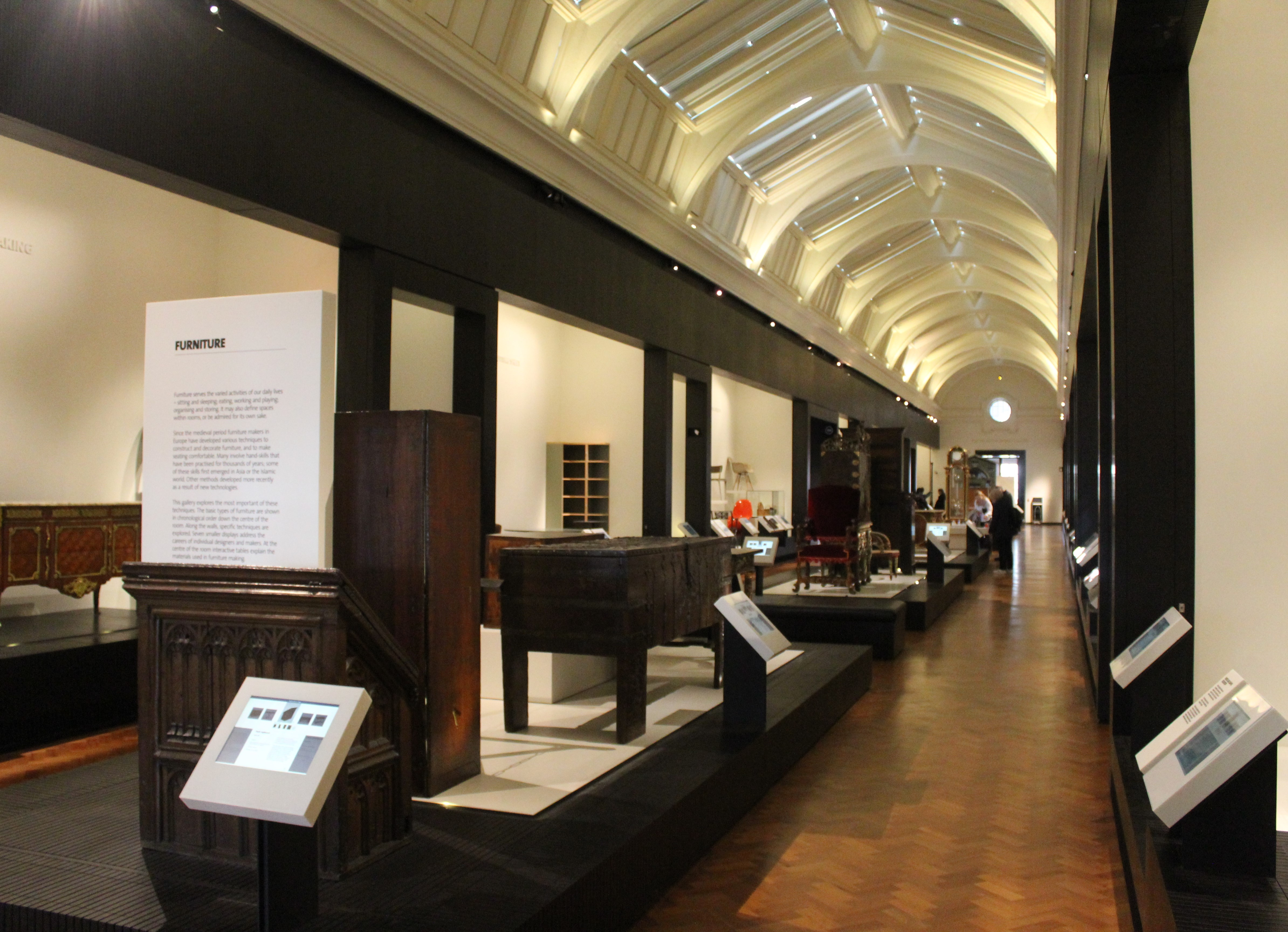
The Furniture Galleries, Room 134

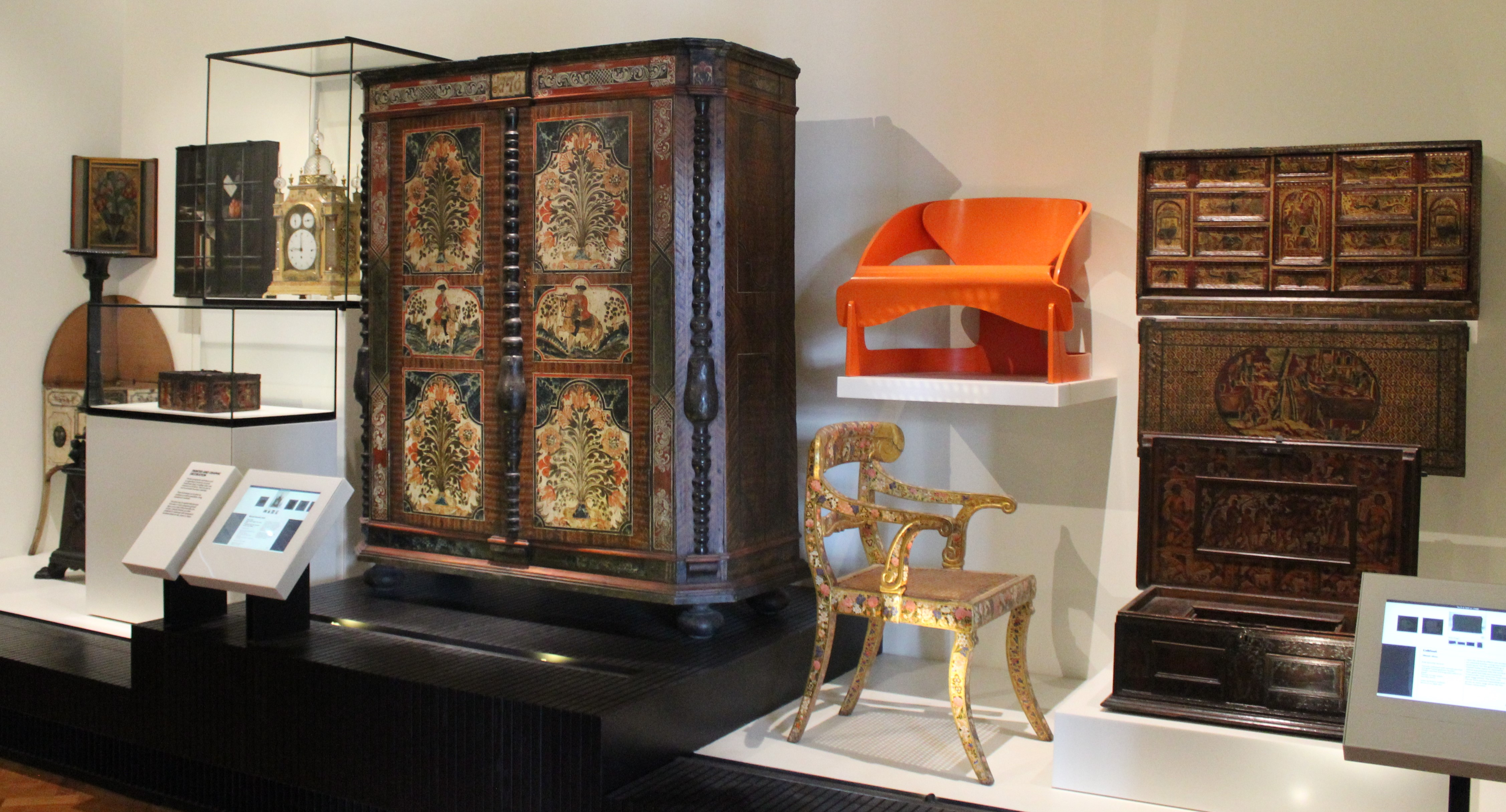
Museum display of furniture, Room 135

The furniture collection, while covering Europe and America from the Middle Ages to the present, is predominantly British, dating between 1700 and 1900. Many of the finest examples are displayed in the British Galleries, including pieces by Chippendale, Adam, Morris and Mackintosh. One of the oldest objects is a chair leg from Middle Egypt dated to 200-395AD.

The Furniture and Woodwork collection also includes complete rooms, musical instruments and clocks. Among the rooms owned by the museum are the Boudoir of Madame de Sévilly (Paris, 1781–82) by Claude Nicolas Ledoux, with painted panelling by Jean Simeon Rousseau de la Rottière. Frank Lloyd Wright's Kaufmann Office, designed and built between 1934 and 1937 for the owner of a Pittsburgh department store, is now displayed in the V&A East Storehouse

The collection includes pieces by William Kent, Henry Flitcroft, Matthias Lock, James Stuart, William Chambers, John Gillow, James Wyatt, Thomas Hopper, Charles Heathcote Tatham, Pugin, William Burges, Charles Voysey, Charles Robert Ashbee, Baillie Scott, Edwin Lutyens, Edward Maufe, Wells Coates and Robin Day. The museum also hosts the national collection of wallpaper, which is looked after by the Prints, Drawings and Paintings department.

The Soulages collection of Italian and French Renaissance objects was acquired between 1859 and 1865, and includes several cassone. The John Jones Collection of French 18th-century art and furnishings was left to the museum in the Jones Bequest of 1882, then valued at £250,000. One of the most important pieces in this collection is a marquetry commode by the ébéniste Jean Henri Riesener dated c1780. Other signed pieces of furniture in the collection include a bureau by Jean-François Oeben, a pair of pedestals with inlaid brass work by André Charles Boulle, a commode by Bernard Vanrisamburgh and a work-table by Martin Carlin. Other 18th-century ébénistes represented in the museum collection include Adam Weisweiler, David Roentgen, Gilles Joubert and Pierre Langlois. In 1901, Sir George Donaldson donated several pieces of art Nouveau furniture to the museum, which he had acquired the previous year at the Paris Exposition Universelle. This was criticised at the time, with the result that the museum ceased to collect contemporary pieces and did not do so again until the 1960s. In 1986 the Lady Abingdon collection of French Empire furniture was bequeathed by Mrs T. R. P. Hole.

There are a set of inlaid doors, dated 1580 from Antwerp City Hall, attributed to Hans Vredeman de Vries. One of the finest pieces of continental furniture in the collection is the Rococo Augustus Rex Bureau Cabinet dated c1750 from Germany, with especially fine marquetry and ormolu mounts. One of the grandest pieces of 19th-century furniture is the highly elaborate French Cabinet dated 1861–1867 made by M. Fourdinois, made from ebony inlaid with box, lime, holly, pear, walnut and mahogany woods as well as marble with gilded carvings. Furniture designed by Ernest Gimson, Edward William Godwin, Charles Voysey, Adolf Loos and Otto Wagner are among the late 19th-century and early 20th-century examples in the collection. The work of modernists in the collection include Le Corbusier, Marcel Breuer, Charles and Ray Eames and Giò Ponti.

One of the oldest clocks in the collection is an astronomical clock of 1588 by Francis Nowe. One of the largest is James Markwick the younger's longcase clock of 1725, nearly 3 metres in height and japanned. Other clockmakers with work in the collection include: Thomas Tompion, Benjamin Lewis Vulliamy, John Ellicott and William Carpenter.

=== Jewellery ===
The museum's jewellery collection, containing over 6000 pieces is one of the finest and most comprehensive collections of jewellery in the world and includes works dating from Ancient Egypt to the present day. The museum owns pieces by renowned jewellers Cartier, Jean Schlumberger, Peter Carl Fabergé, Andrew Grima, Hemmerle and René Lalique. Other items in the collection include diamond dress ornaments made for Catherine the Great, bracelet clasps once belonging to Marie Antoinette, and the Beauharnais emerald necklace presented by Napoleon to his adopted daughter Hortense de Beauharnais in 1806. The museum also collects international modern jewellery by designers such as Gijs Bakker, Onno Boekhoudt and Wendy Ramshaw, and African and Asian traditional jewellery. Major bequests include Reverend Chauncy Hare Townshend's collection of 154 gems bequeathed in 1869, Lady Cory's 1951 gift of major diamond jewellery from the 18th and 19th centuries, and jewellery scholar Dame Joan Evans' 1977 gift of more than 800 jewels dating from the Middle Ages to the early 19th century. A new jewellery gallery, funded by William and Judith Bollinger, opened on 24 May 2008.

=== Metalwork ===
This collection of more than 45,000 objects covers decorative ironwork, both wrought and cast, bronze, silverware, arms and armour, pewter, brassware and enamels (including many examples Limoges enamel). The main iron work gallery was redesigned in 1995.

There are over 10,000 objects made from silver or gold in the collection, the display (about 15 percent of the collection) is divided into secular and sacred covering both Christian (Roman Catholic, Anglican and Greek Orthodox) and Jewish liturgical vessels and other works. The main silver gallery is divided into these areas: British silver pre-1800; British silver 1800 to 1900; modernist to contemporary silver; European silver. The collection includes the earliest known piece of English silver with a dated hallmark, a silver gilt beaker dated 1496–1497.

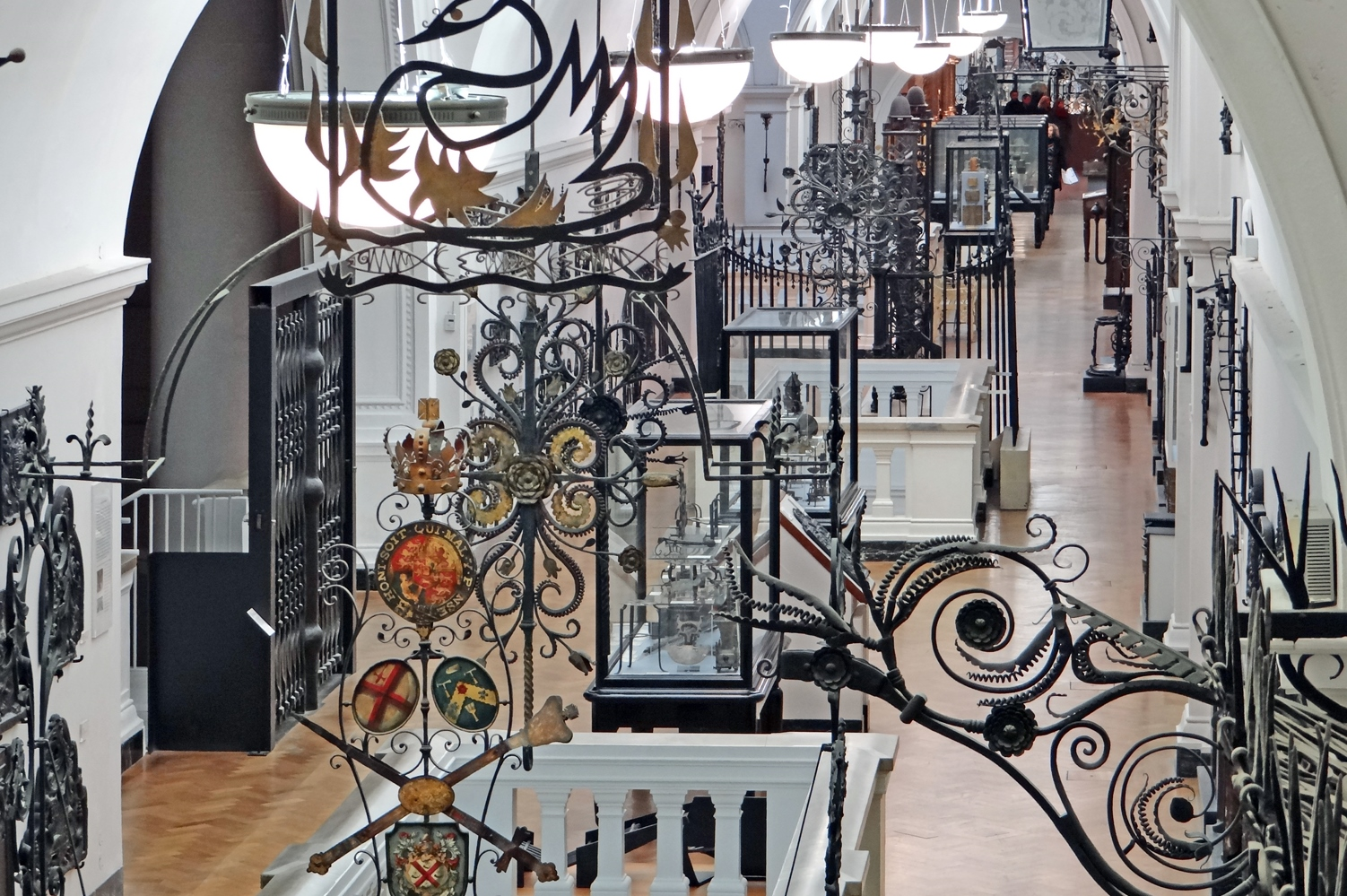
Second floor Ironwork gallery, room 114a

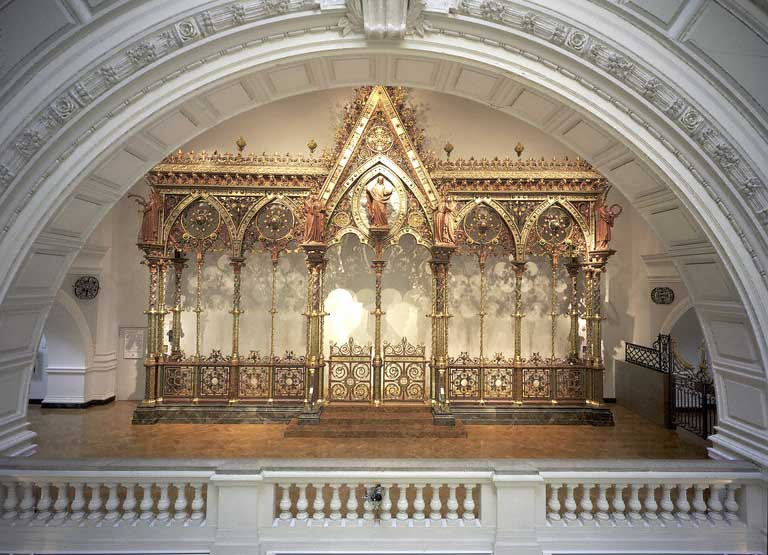
George Gilbert Scott—Screen from Hereford Cathedral, 1862

Silversmiths whose work is represented in the collection include Paul Storr (whose Castlereagh Inkstand, dated 1817–1819, is one of his finest works) and Paul de Lamerie.

The main iron work gallery covers European wrought and cast iron from the medieval period to the early 20th century. The master of wrought ironwork Jean Tijou is represented by both examples of his work and designs on paper. One of the largest objects is the Hereford Screen, weighing nearly 8 tonnes, 10.5 metres high and 11 metres wide, designed by Sir George Gilbert Scott in 1862 for the chancel in Hereford Cathedral, from which it was removed in 1967. It was made by Skidmore & Company. Its structure of timber and cast iron is embellished with wrought iron, burnished brass and copper. Much of the copper and ironwork is painted in a wide range of colours. The arches and columns are decorated with polished quartz and panels of mosaic.

One of the rarest works in the collection is the 58 cm-high Gloucester Candlestick, dated to c1110, made from gilt bronze; with highly elaborate and intricate intertwining branches containing small figures and inscriptions, it is a tour de force of bronze casting. Also of importance is the Becket Casket dated c1180 to contain relics of St Thomas Becket, made from gilt copper, with enamelled scenes of the saint's martyrdom. Another highlight is the 1351 Reichenau Crozier. The Burghley Nef, a salt-cellar, French, dated 1527–1528, uses a nautilus shell to form the hull of a vessel, which rests on the tail of a parcelgilt mermaid, who rests on a hexagonal gilt plinth on six claw-and-ball feet. Both masts have main and top-sails, and battlemented fighting-tops are made from gold. These items are displayed in the new Medieval & Renaissance galleries.

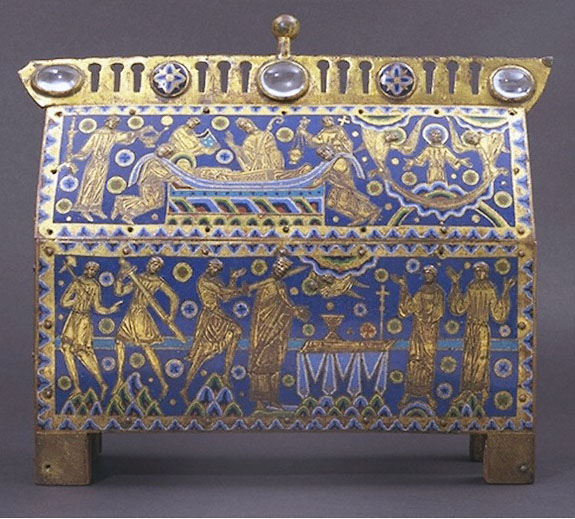
The Becket Casket

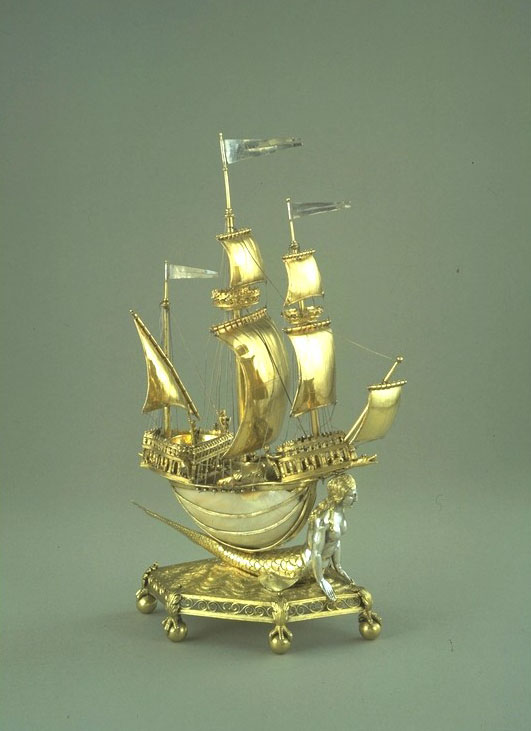
The Burghley Nef

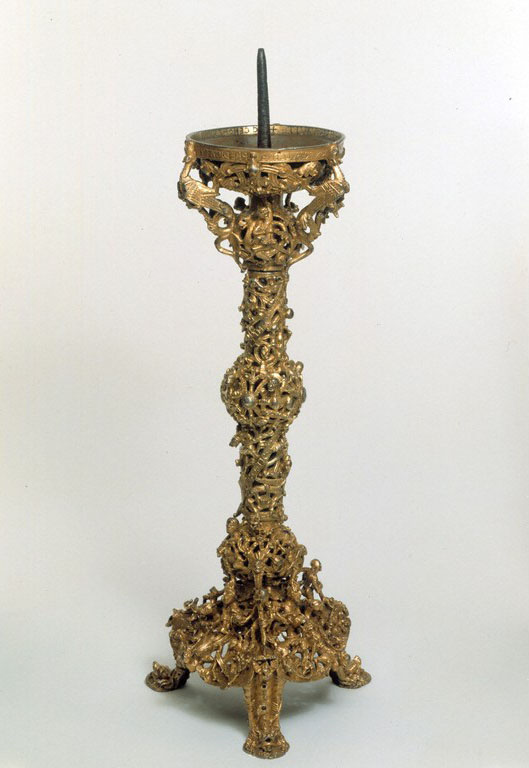
The Gloucester Candlestick

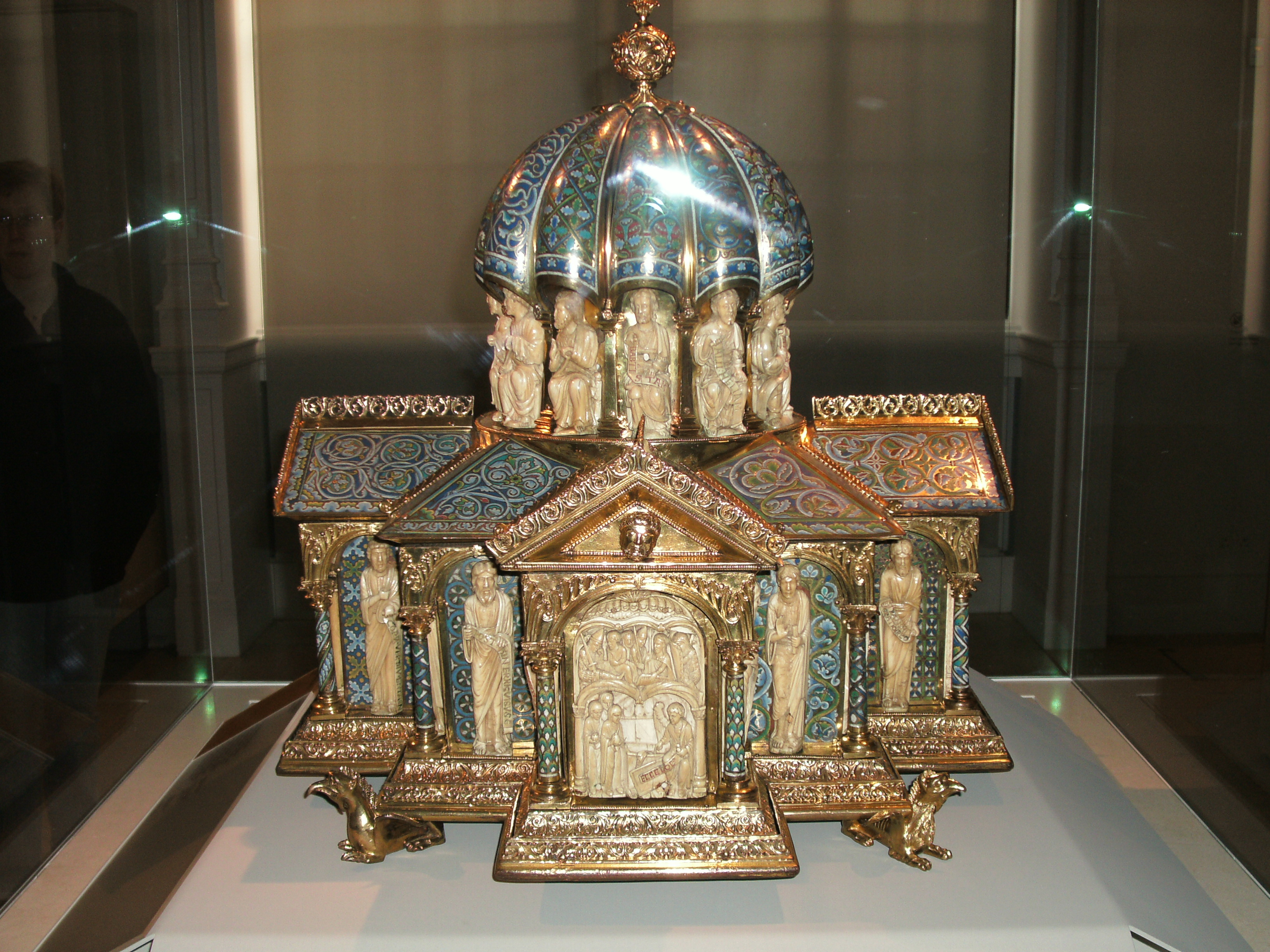
Tabernacle, Cologne, Germany, c. 1180

=== Musical instruments ===
Musical instruments are classified as furniture by the museum, although Asian instruments are held by their relevant departments.

Among the more important instruments owned by the museum are a violin by Antonio Stradivari dated 1699, an oboe that belonged to Gioachino Rossini, and a jewelled spinet dated 1571 made by Annibale Rossi. The collection also includes a c. 1570 virginal said to have belonged to Elizabeth I, and late 19th-century pianos designed by Edward Burne-Jones, and Baillie Scott.

The Musical Instruments gallery closed on 25 February 2010, a decision that was highly controversial. An online petition of over 5,100 names on the Parliamentary website led to Chris Smith asking in Parliament about the future of the collection. The answer, from Bryan Davies, was that the museum intended to preserve and care for the collection and keep it available to the public, with objects being redistributed to the British Galleries, the Medieval & Renaissance Galleries, and the planned new galleries for Furniture and Europe 1600–1800, and that the Horniman Museum and other institutions were possible candidates for loans of material to ensure that the instruments remained publicly viewable. The Horniman went on to host a joint exhibition with the V&A of musical instruments, and has the loan of 35 instruments from the museum.

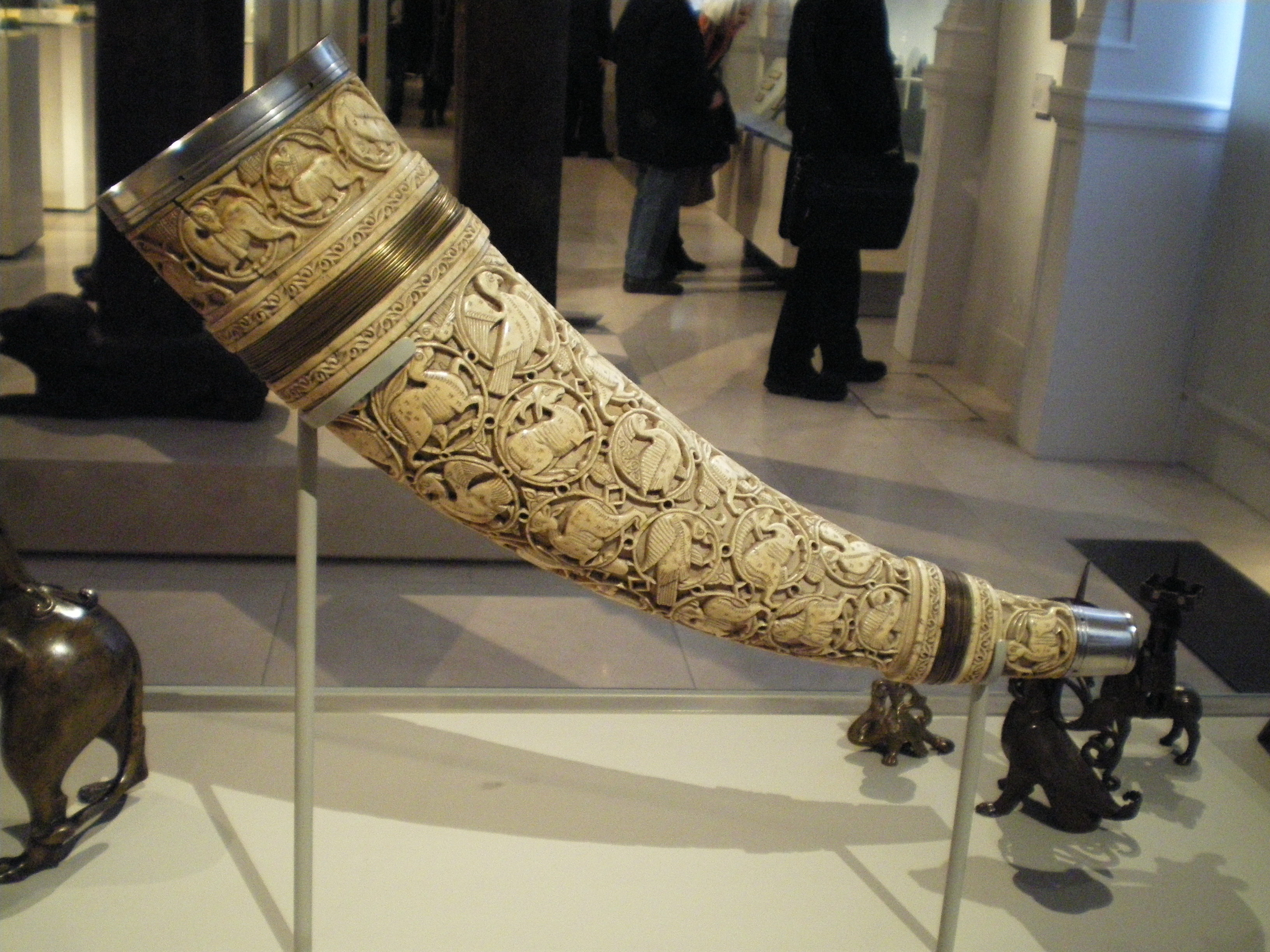
Oliphant in ivory with metal mounts, Italy (Amalfi or Salerno), 11th century

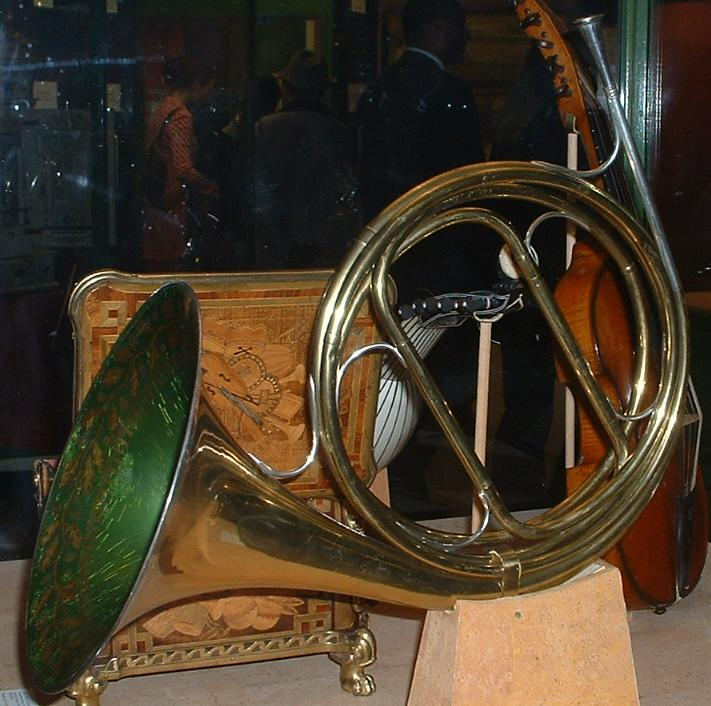
Natural horn in brass, silver, gilt and lacquer, Paris, France c. 1826

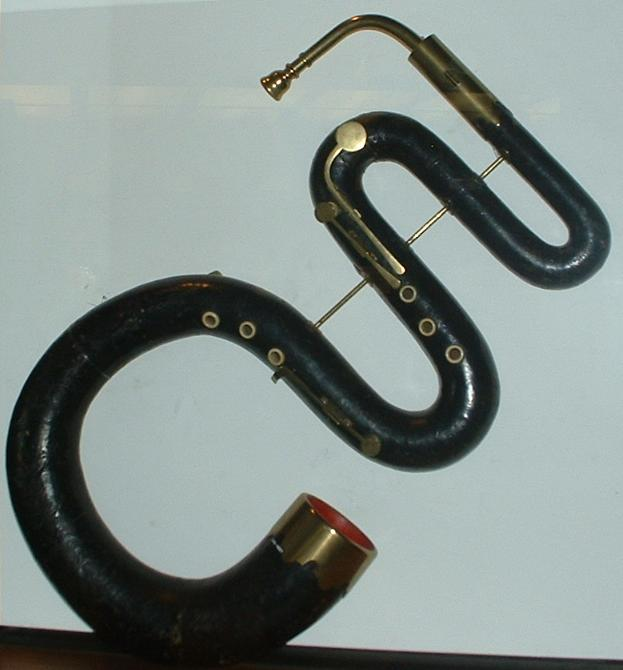
Serpent, England, 1830s

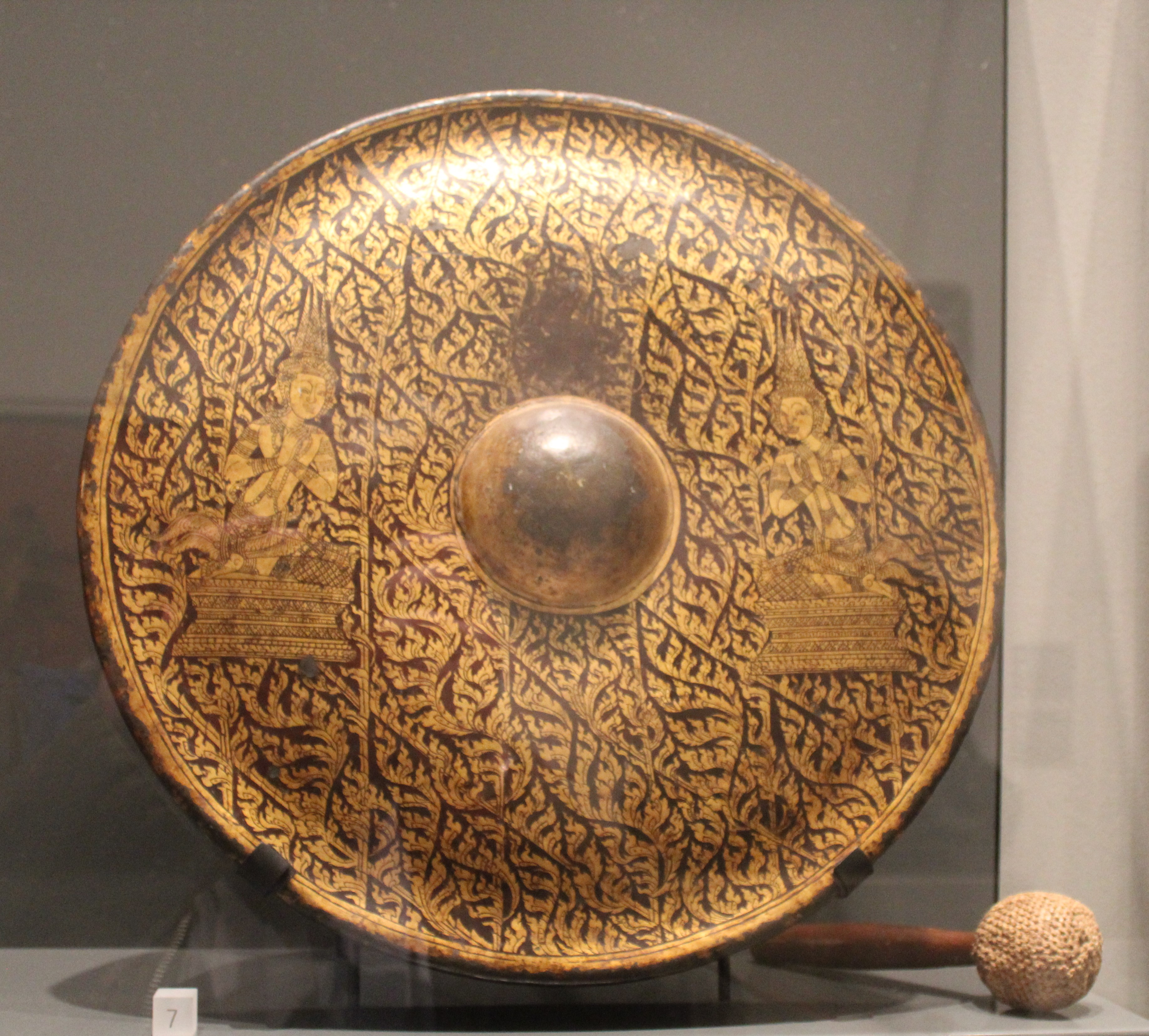
Gong in gilt bronze, Thailand, c. 1800–1850

=== Paintings and miniatures ===
The collection includes about 1130 British and 650 European oil paintings, 6800 British watercolours, pastels and 2000 miniatures, for which the museum holds the national collection. Also on loan to the museum, from His Majesty the King Charles III, are the Raphael Cartoons: the seven surviving (there were ten) full-scale designs for tapestries in the Sistine Chapel, of the lives of Peter and Paul from the Gospels and the Acts of the Apostles. There is also on display a fresco by Pietro Perugino, dated 1522, from the church of Castello at Fontignano (Perugia) which is amongst the painter's last works. One of the largest objects in the collection is the Spanish retable Altarpiece of the Centenar de la Ploma, c. 1400, 670 x 486 cm, in tempera on wood, consisting of numerous scenes and painted by Andrés Marzal De Sax in Valencia.

19th-century British artists are well represented. John Constable and J. M. W. Turner are represented by oil paintings, watercolours and drawings. One of the most unusual objects on display is Thomas Gainsborough's experimental showbox with its back-lit landscapes, which he painted on glass, which allowed them to be changed like slides. Other landscape painters with works on display include Philip James de Loutherbourg, Peter De Wint and John Ward.

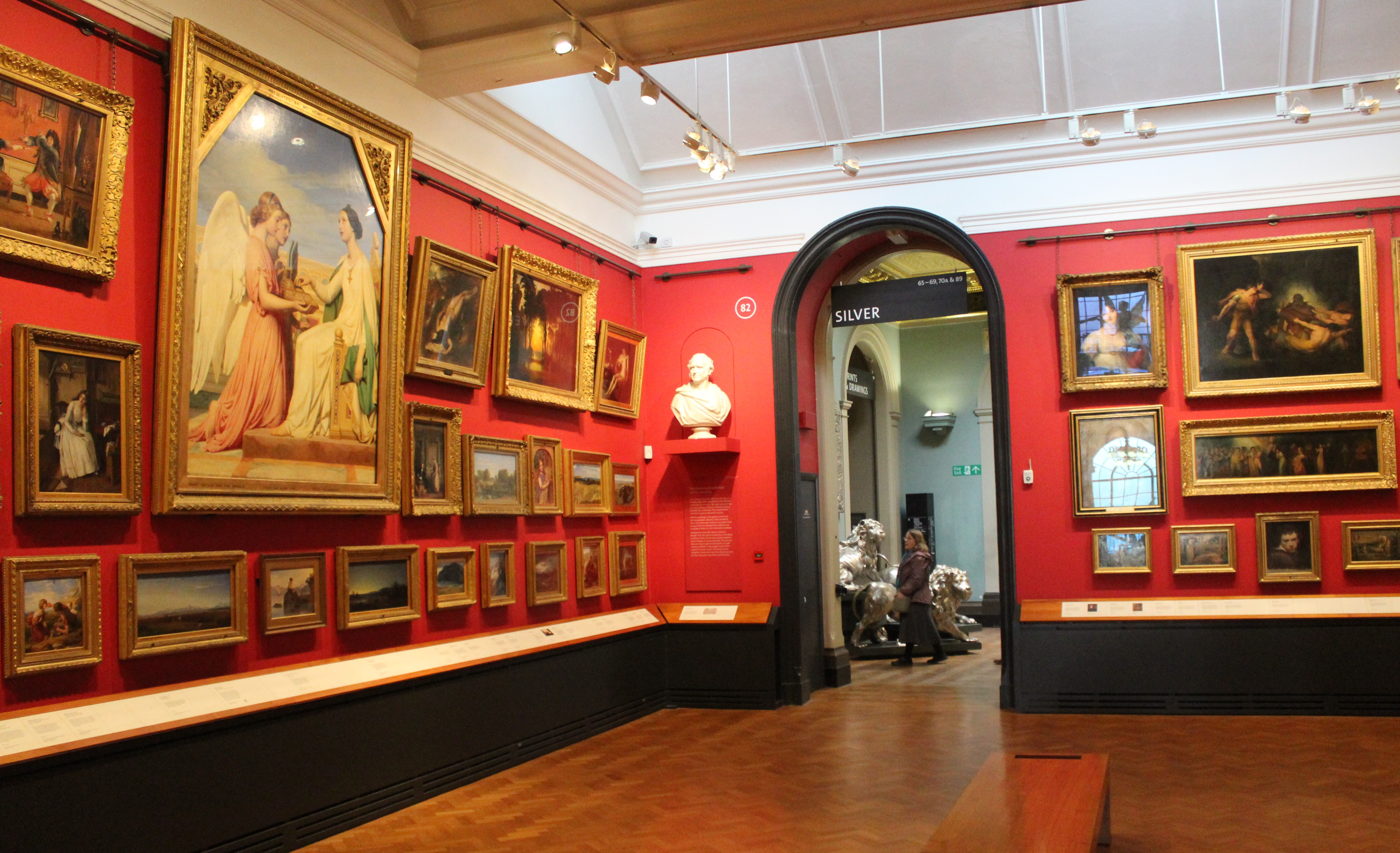
Room 82, The Sheepshanks Gallery

In 1857 John Sheepshanks donated 233 paintings, mainly by contemporary British artists, and a similar number of drawings to the museum with the intention of forming "A National Gallery of British Art", a role since taken on by Tate Britain; artists represented are William Blake, James Barry, Henry Fuseli, Sir Edwin Henry Landseer, Sir David Wilkie, William Mulready, William Powell Frith, Millais and Hippolyte Delaroche. Although some of Constable's works came to the museum with the Sheepshanks bequest, the majority of the artist's works were donated by his daughter Isabel in 1888, including the large number of sketches in oil, the most significant being the 1821 full size oil sketch for The Hay Wain. Other artists with works in the collection include: Bernardino Fungai, Marcus Gheeraerts the Younger, Domenico di Pace Beccafumi, Fioravante Ferramola, Jan Brueghel the Elder, Anthony van Dyck, Ludovico Carracci, Antonio Verrio, Giovanni Battista Tiepolo, Domenico Tiepolo, Canaletto, Francis Hayman, Pompeo Batoni, Benjamin West, Richard Wilson, William Etty, Sir Thomas Lawrence, Francis Danby, Richard Parkes Bonington and Alphonse Legros.

Richard Ellison's collection of 100 British watercolours was given by his widow in 1860 and 1873 'to promote the foundation of the National Collection of Water-Color Paintings'. Over 500 British and European oil paintings, watercolours and miniatures and 3000 drawings and prints were bequeathed in 1868–1869 by the clergymen Chauncey Hare Townshend and Alexander Dyce.

Several French paintings entered the collection as part of the 260 paintings and miniatures (not all the works were French, for example Carlo Crivelli's Virgin and Child) that formed part of the Jones Bequest of 1882 and are displayed in the galleries of continental art 1600–1800. These include the portrait of François, Duc d'Alençon by François Clouet, works by Gaspard Dughet and by François Boucher including his portrait of Madame de Pompadour dated 1758, Jean François de Troy, Jean-Baptiste Pater and their contemporaries.

Another major Victorian benefactor was Constantine Alexander Ionides, who left 82 oil paintings to the museum in 1901, including works by Botticelli, Tintoretto, Adriaen Brouwer, Jean-Baptiste-Camille Corot, Gustave Courbet, Eugène Delacroix, Théodore Rousseau, Edgar Degas, Jean-François Millet, Dante Gabriel Rossetti, Edward Burne-Jones, plus watercolours and over a thousand drawings and prints

The Salting Bequest of 1909 included, among other works, watercolours by J. M. W. Turner. Other watercolourists include: William Gilpin, Thomas Rowlandson, William Blake, John Sell Cotman, Paul Sandby, William Mulready, Edward Lear, James Abbott McNeill Whistler and Paul Cézanne.

There is a copy of Raphael's The School of Athens over 4 metres by 8 metres in size, dated 1755 by Anton Raphael Mengs on display in the eastern Cast Court.

Miniaturists represented in the collection include Jean Bourdichon, Hans Holbein the Younger, Nicholas Hilliard, Isaac Oliver, Peter Oliver, Jean Petitot, Alexander Cooper, Samuel Cooper, Thomas Flatman, Rosalba Carriera, Christian Friedrich Zincke, George Engleheart, John Smart, Richard Cosway and William Charles Ross.

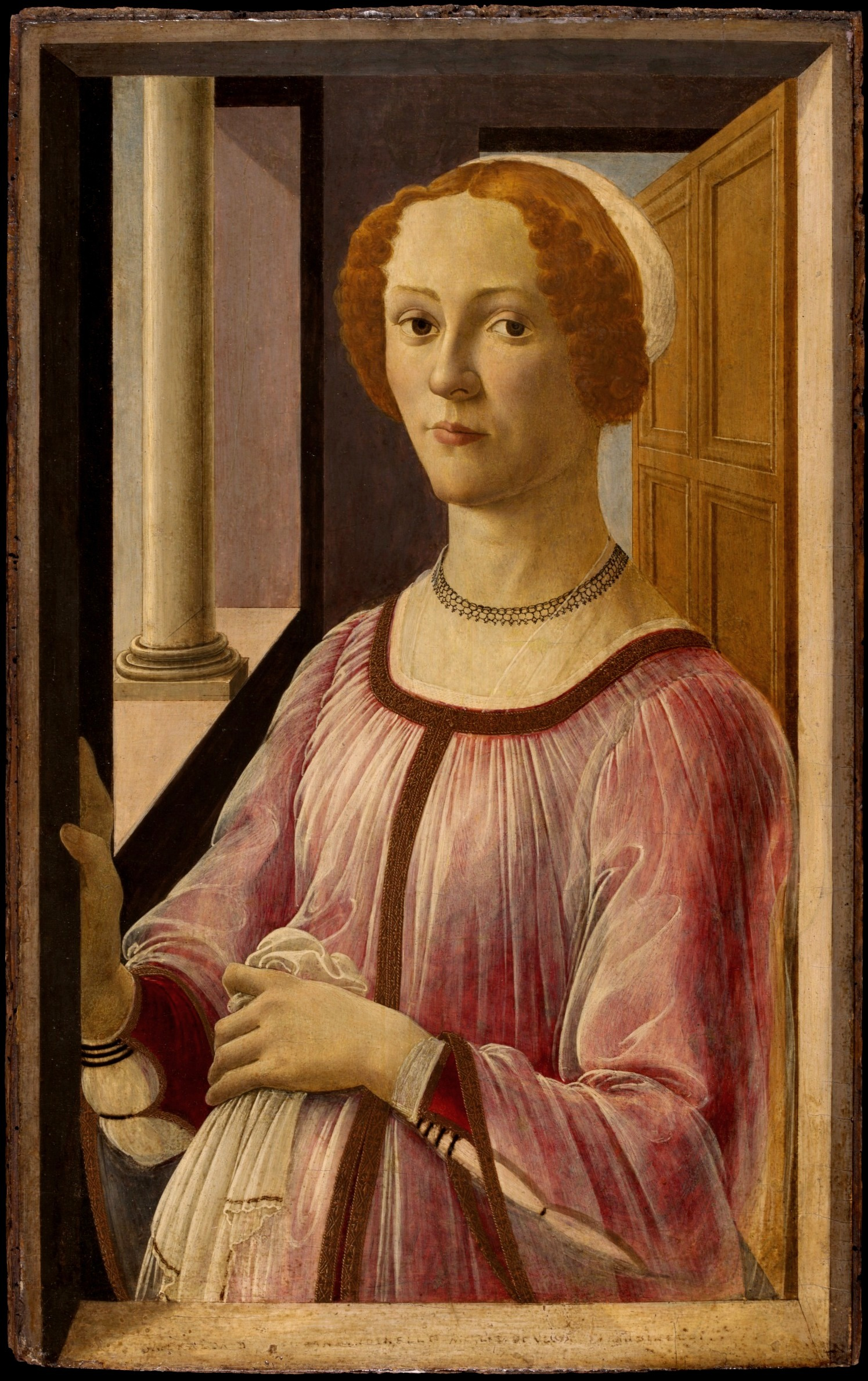
Portrait of Smeralda Brandini by Botticelli, 1470–1475

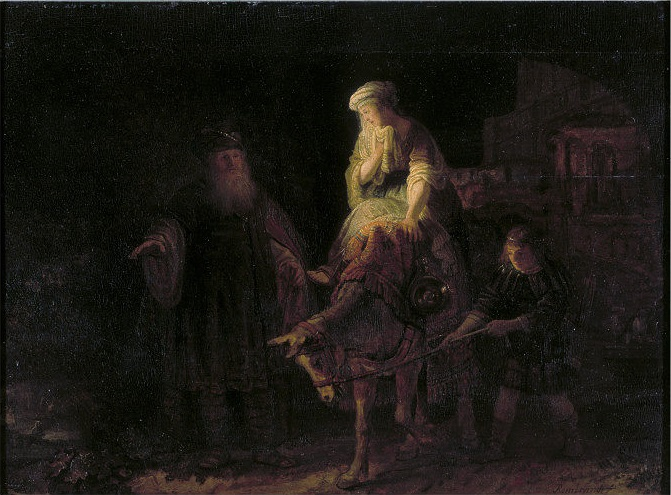
The Departure of the Shunammite Woman by Rembrandt, c. 1640

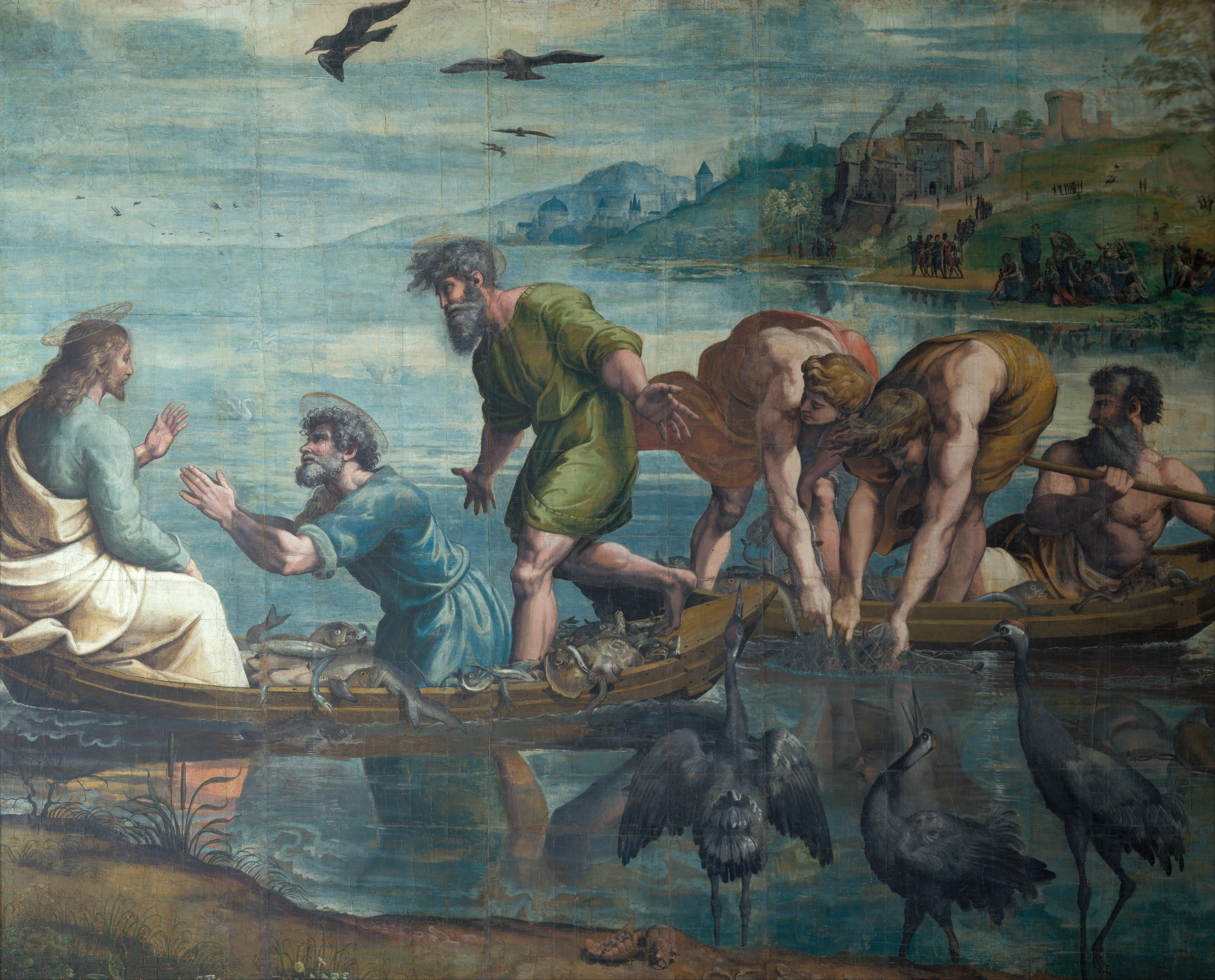
The Miraculous Draught of Fishes by Raphael, 1515

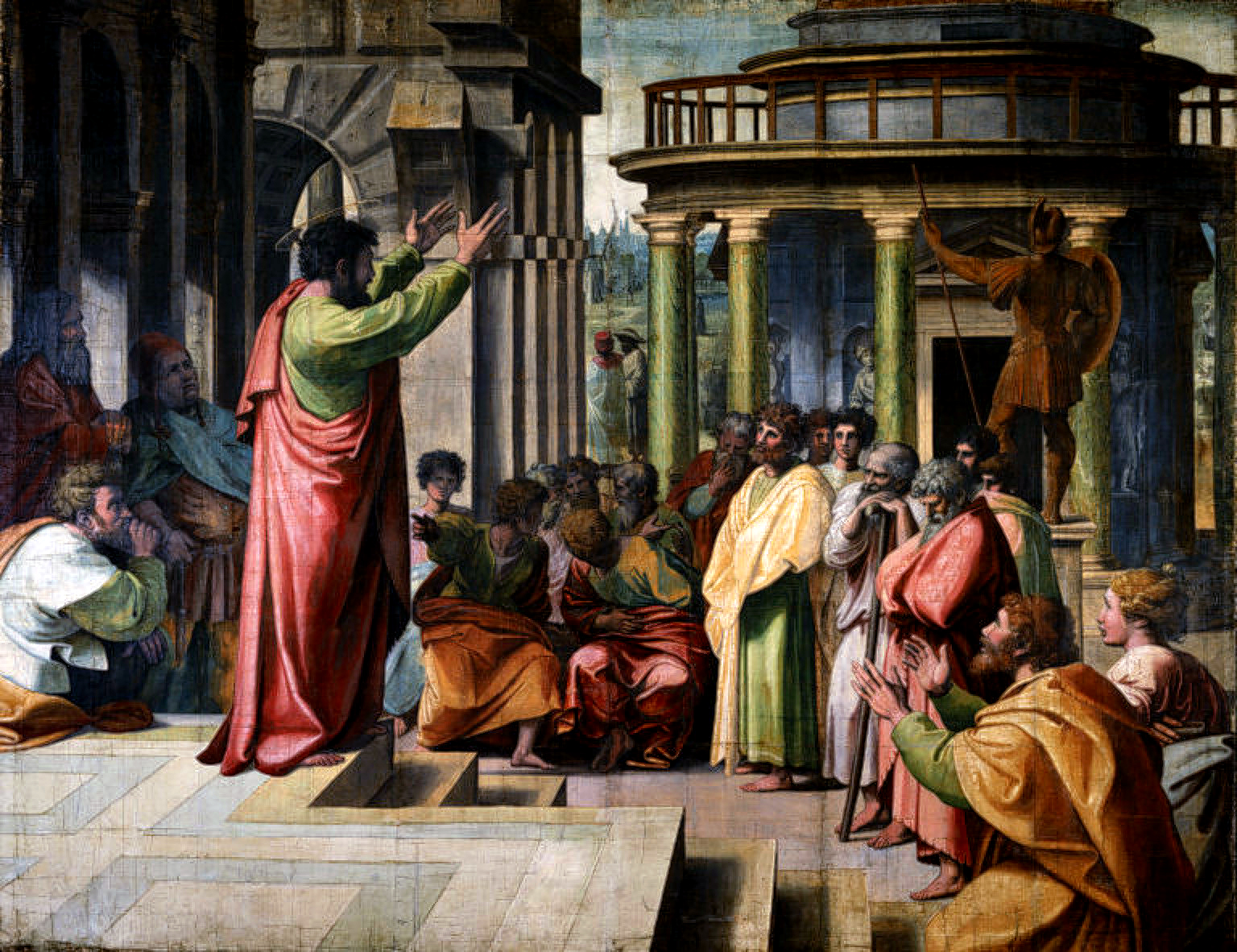
St Paul Preaching in Athens by Raphael, 1515

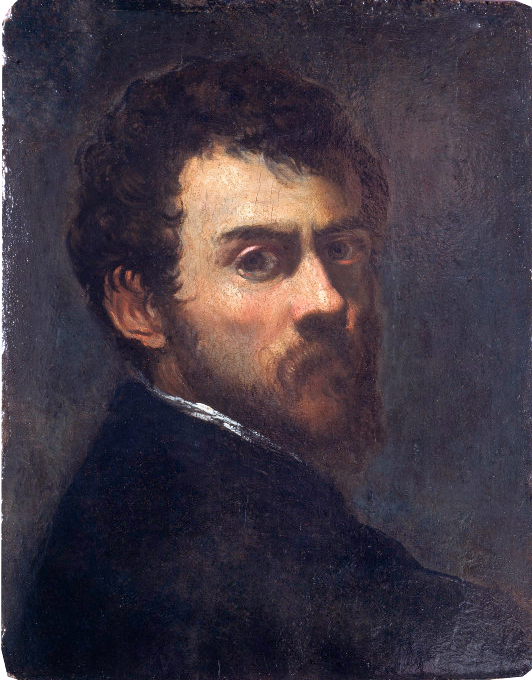
Self-Portrait as a Young Man by Tintoretto, c. 1548
Dedham Lock and Mill by John Constable, 1820

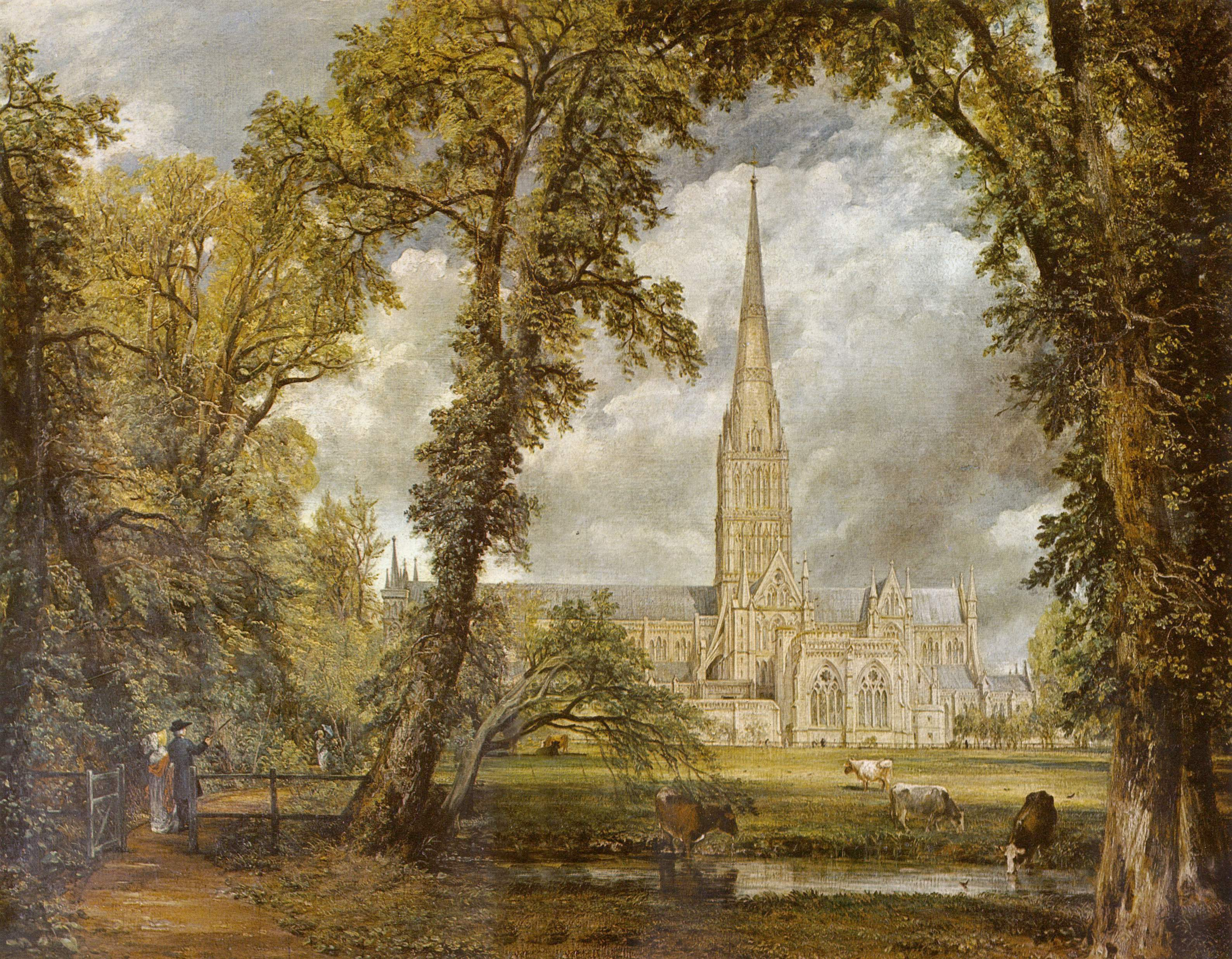
View of Salisbury Cathedral by John Constable, 1823

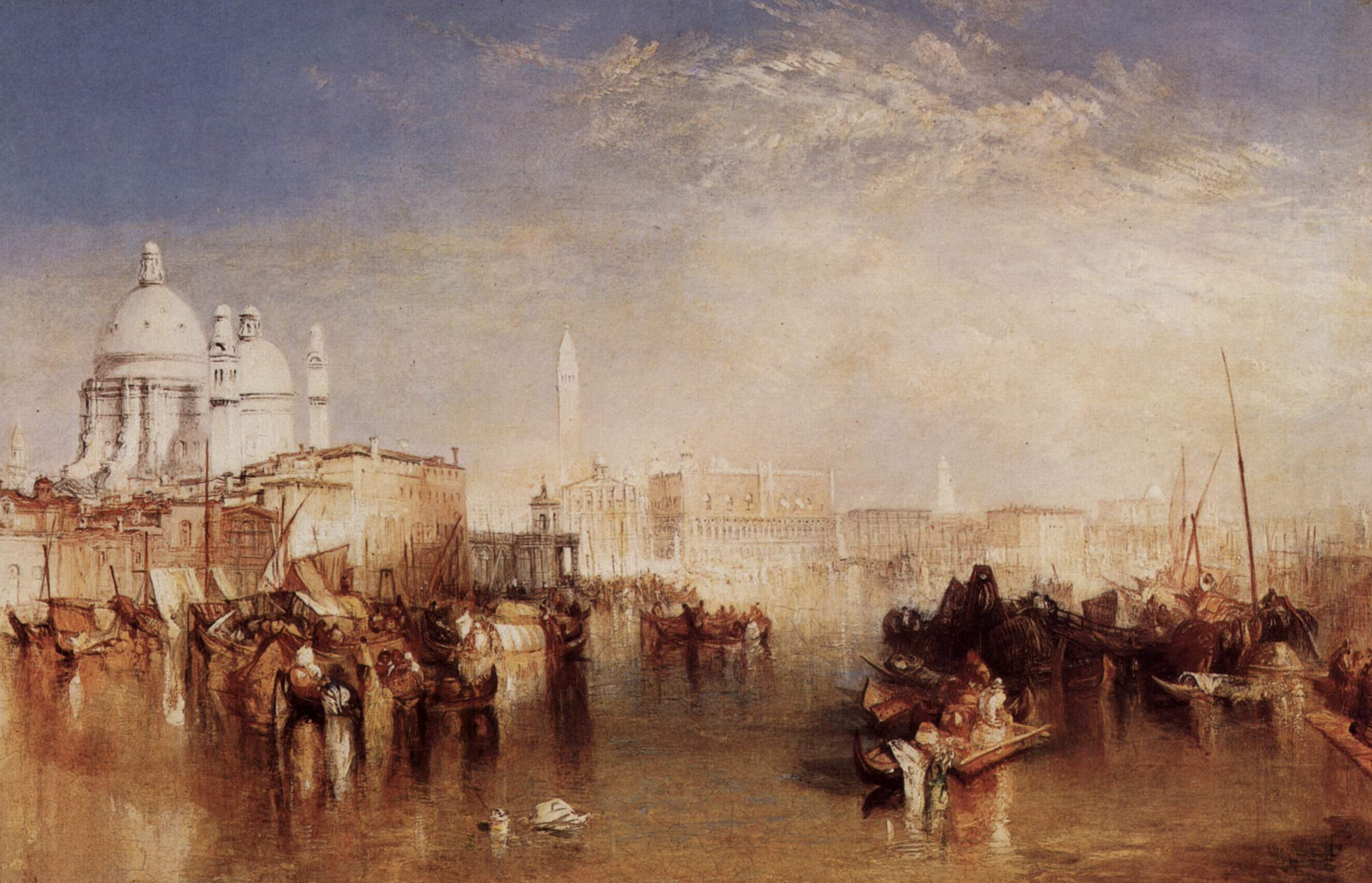
Venice from the Giudecca by J. M. W. Turner, 1840

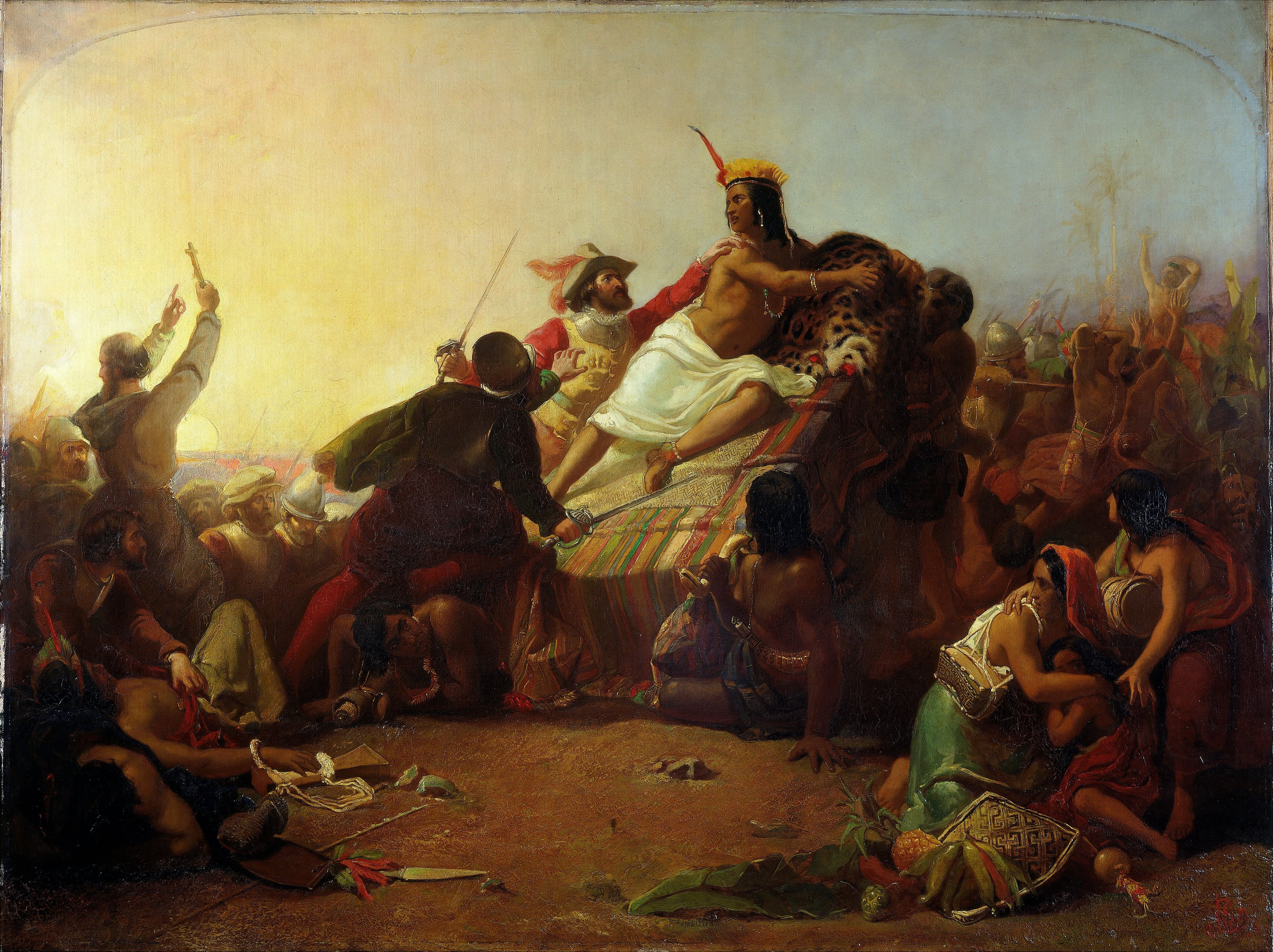
Pizarro Seizing the Inca of Peru by John Everett Millais, 1846

=== Photography ===
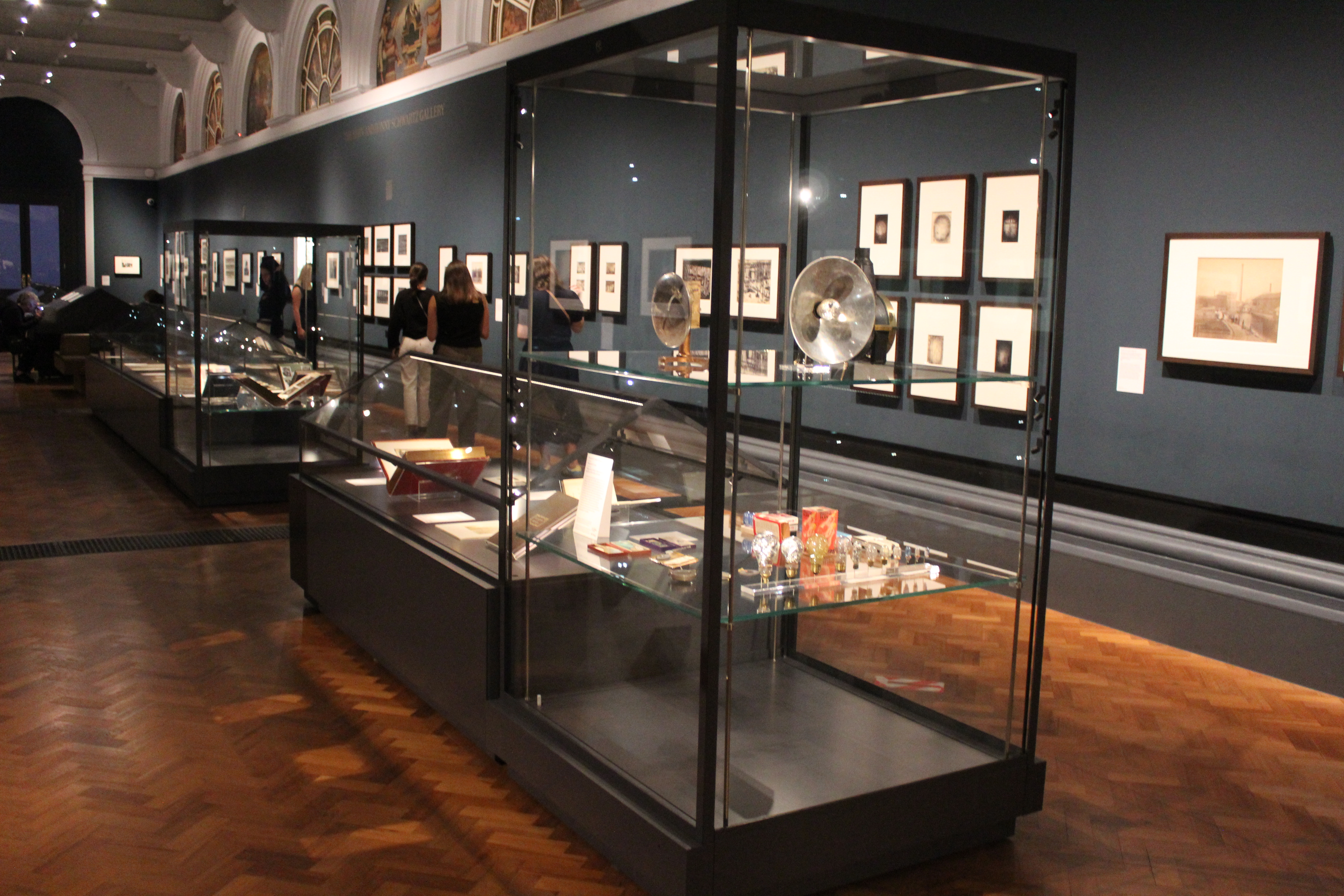
Photography Centre, Room 100

The collection contains more than 500,000 images dating from the advent of photography, the oldest image dating from 1839. The gallery displays a series of changing exhibits and closes between exhibitions to allow full re-display to take place. In 1858, it presented the world's first international photographic exhibition.

The collection includes the work of many photographers from Fox Talbot, Julia Margaret Cameron, Viscountess Clementina Hawarden, Gustave Le Gray, Benjamin Brecknell Turner, Frederick Hollyer, Samuel Bourne, Roger Fenton, Man Ray, Henri Cartier-Bresson, Ilse Bing, Bill Brandt, Cecil Beaton (there are more than 8000 of his negatives), Don McCullin, David Bailey, Jim Lee and Helen Chadwick to the present day.

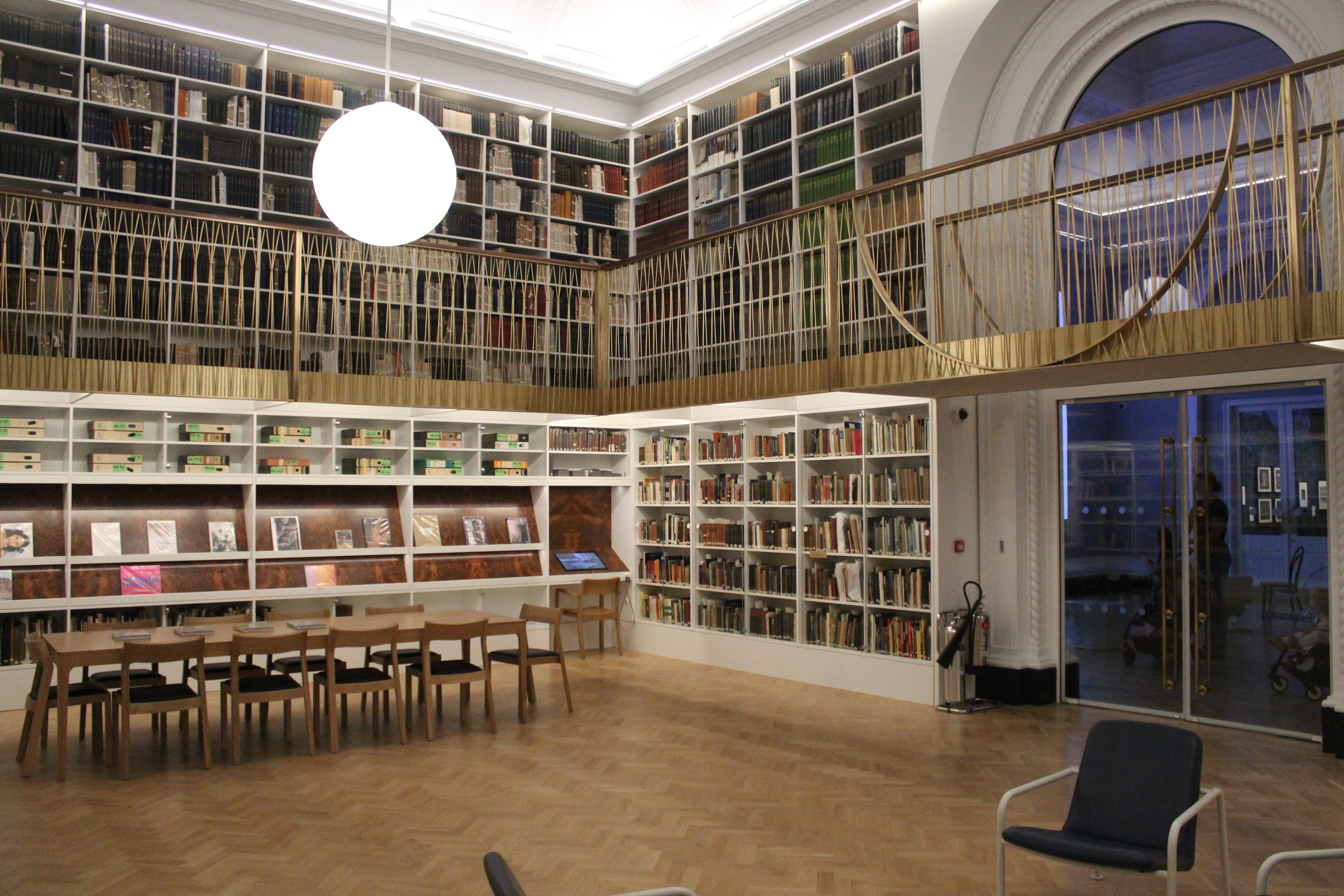
Room 98, the reading room for the photography collection

One of the more unusual collections is that of Eadweard Muybridge's photographs of Animal Locomotion of 1887, this consists of 781 plates. These sequences of photographs taken a fraction of a second apart capture images of different animals and humans performing various actions. There are several of John Thomson's 1876-7 images of Street Life in London in the collection. The museum also holds James Lafayette's society portraits, a collection of more than 600 photographs dating from the late 19th to early 20th centuries and portraying a wide range of society figures of the period, including Indian maharajas, Ethiopian rulers and photographs recording the guests at the famous fancy-dress ball held at Devonshire House in 1897 to celebrate Queen Victoria's diamond jubilee.

In 2003 and 2007, Curtis Moffat's extensive archive was donated to the museum. He created dynamic abstract photographs, innovative colour still-lives and glamorous society portraits during the 1920s and 1930s. He was also a pivotal figure in Modernist interior design. In Paris during the 1920s, Moffat collaborated with Man Ray, producing portraits and abstract photograms or "rayographs".

=== Sculpture ===
The sculpture collection at the V&A is the most comprehensive holding of post-classical European sculpture in the world. There are approximately 22,000 objects in the collection dating from about 400AD to 1914 and includes Byzantine and Anglo-Saxon ivory sculptures, British, French and Spanish medieval statues and carvings and works from the Renaissance, Baroque, Neo-Classical, Victorian and Art Nouveau periods. All uses of sculpture are represented, from tomb and memorial, to portrait, allegorical, religious, mythical, statues for gardens including fountains, as well as architectural decorations. Materials used include, marble, alabaster, stone, terracotta, wood (history of wood carving), ivory, gesso, plaster, bronze, lead and ceramics.

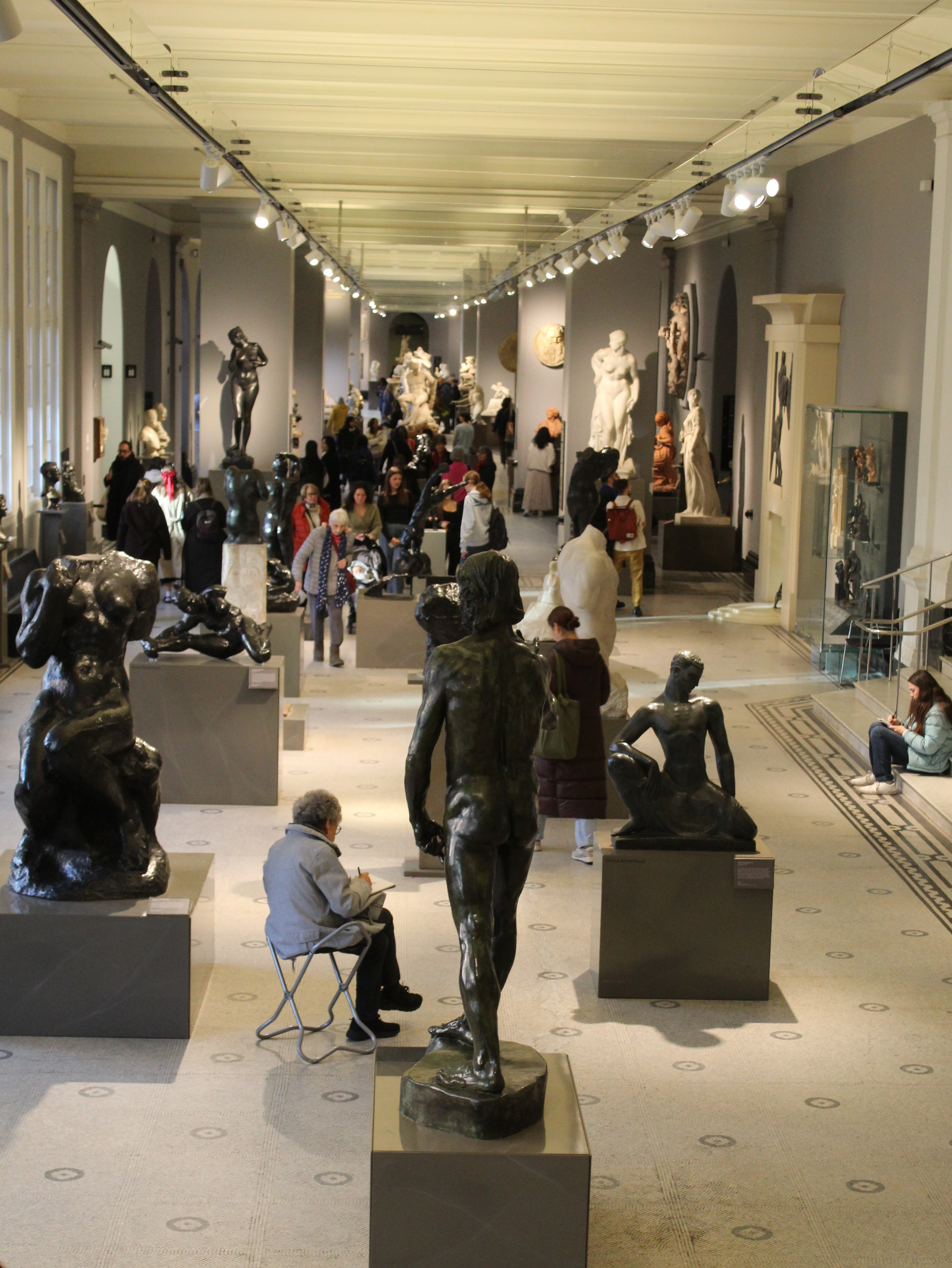
Sculpture Room 21

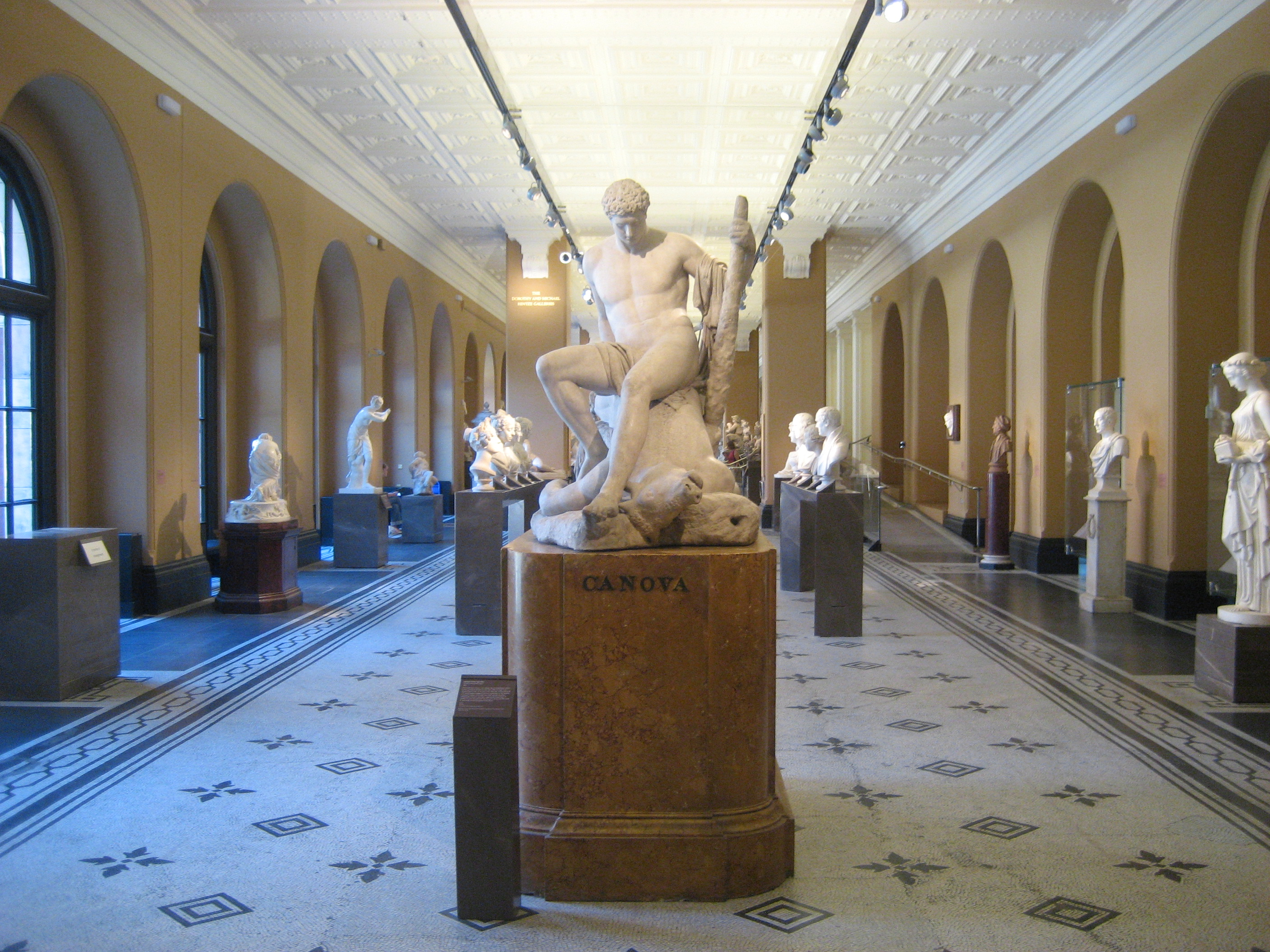
Sculpture 1600–1870 (Room 22)

The collection of Italian sculpture (both original and in cast form) is unequalled outside of Italy. It includes Canova's The Three Graces, which the museum jointly owns with National Galleries of Scotland. Italian sculptors whose work is held by the museum include: Bartolomeo Bon, Bartolomeo Bellano, Luca della Robbia, Giovanni Pisano, Donatello, Agostino di Duccio, Andrea Riccio, Antonio Rossellino, Andrea del Verrocchio, Antonio Lombardo, Pier Jacopo Alari Bonacolsi, Andrea della Robbia, Michelozzo di Bartolomeo, Michelangelo (represented by a freehand wax model and casts of his most famous sculptures), Jacopo Sansovino, Alessandro Algardi, Antonio Calcagni, Benvenuto Cellini (Medusa's head dated c. 1547), Agostino Busti, Bartolomeo Ammannati, Giacomo della Porta, Giambologna (Samson Slaying a Philistine c. 1562, his finest work outside Italy), Bernini (Neptune and Triton c. 1622–3), Giovanni Battista Foggini, Vincenzo Foggini (Samson and the Philistines), Massimiliano Soldani Benzi, Antonio Corradini, Andrea Brustolon, Giovanni Battista Piranesi, Innocenzo Spinazzi, Canova, Carlo Marochetti and Raffaelle Monti.

An unusual sculpture is the ancient Roman statue of Narcissus restored by Valerio Cioli c. 1564 with plaster. There are several small scale bronzes by Donatello such as The Ascension with Christ giving the Keys to St Peter and Lamentation of Christ, Alessandro Vittoria, Tiziano Aspetti and Francesco Fanelli in the collection. The largest work from Italy is the Chancel Chapel from Santa Chiara Florence dated 1493–1500, designed by Giuliano da Sangallo it is 11.1 metres in height by 5.4 metres square, it includes a grand sculpted tabernacle by Antonio Rossellino and coloured terracotta decoration.

Rodin is represented by more than 20 works in the museum collection, making it one of the largest collections of the sculptor's work outside France; these were given to the museum by the sculptor in 1914, as acknowledgement of Britain's support of France in the First World War, although the statue of St John the Baptist had been purchased in 1902 by public subscription. Other French sculptors with work in the collection are Hubert Le Sueur, François Girardon, Michel Clodion, Jean-Antoine Houdon, Jean-Baptiste Carpeaux and Jules Dalou.

There are also several Renaissance works by Northern European sculptors in the collection including work by: Veit Stoss, Tilman Riemenschneider, Hendrick de Keyser, Hans Daucher and Peter Flötner. Baroque works from the same area include the work of Adriaen de Vries and Sébastien Slodtz. The Spanish sculptors with work in the collection include Alonso Berruguete and Luisa Roldán represented by her Virgin and Child with St Diego of Alcala c. 1695.

Sculptors, both British and European, who were based in Britain and whose work is in the collection include Nicholas Stone, Caius Gabriel Cibber, Grinling Gibbons, John Michael Rysbrack, Louis-François Roubiliac, Peter Scheemakers, Sir Henry Cheere, Agostino Carlini, Thomas Banks, Joseph Nollekens, Joseph Wilton, John Flaxman, Sir Francis Chantrey, John Gibson, Edward Hodges Baily, Lord Leighton, Alfred Stevens, Thomas Brock, Alfred Gilbert, George Frampton and Eric Gill. A sample of some of these sculptors' work is on display in the British Galleries.

In 2006 it was decided to extend the chronology of the works on display up to 1950; this has involved loans by other museums, including Tate Britain, of works by Henry Moore, Jacob Epstein and their contemporaries. Works dated between 1600 and 1950 by British sculptors, works by continental sculptors who worked in Britain and works bought by British patrons from the continental sculptors are arranged by theme, tomb sculpture, portraiture, garden sculpture and mythology in the sculpture galleries south of the garden.

Smaller-scale works are displayed in the Gilbert Bayes gallery, covering medieval especially English alabaster sculpture, bronzes, wooden sculptures and has demonstrations of various techniques such as bronze casting using lost-wax casting.

The majority of the Medieval and Renaissance sculpture is displayed in the Medieval and Renaissance galleries which opened in December 2009.

=== Textiles ===
The collection of textiles consists of more than 53,000 items, mainly western European though all populated continents are represented, dating from the 1st century AD to the present. This is the largest such collection in the world. Techniques represented include weaving, printing, quilting embroidery, lace, tapestry and carpets. Represented in the collection are early silks from the Near East, lace, European tapestries and English medieval church embroidery.

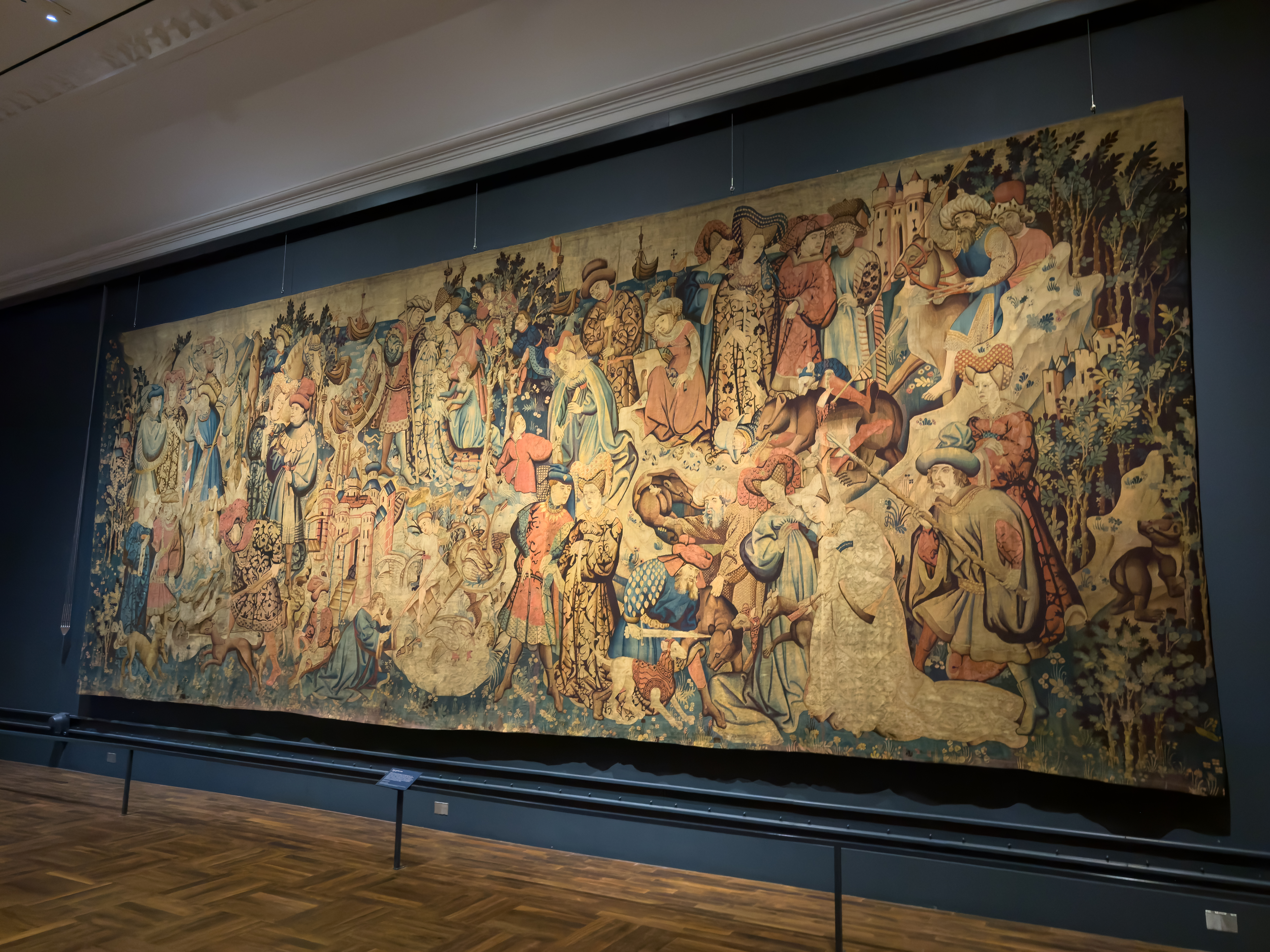
One of the Devonshire Tapestries, Netherlands, mid-15th century

The tapestry collection includes a fragment of the Cloth of St Gereon, the oldest known surviving European tapestry. A highlight of the collection is the four Devonshire Hunting Tapestries, very rare 15th-century tapestries, woven in the Netherlands, depicting the hunting of various animals; not just their age but their size make these unique. Both of the major English centres of tapestry weaving of the 16th and 17th centuries respectively, Sheldon & Mortlake are represented in the collection by several examples. Also included are tapestries from John Vanderbank's workshop which was the leading English tapestry manufactory in the late 17th century and early 18th century. Some of the finest tapestries are examples from the Gobelins Manufactory, including a set of 'Jason and the Argonauts' dating from the 1750s. Other continental centres of tapestry weaving with work in the collection include Brussels, Tournai, Beauvais, Strasbourg and Florence.

One of the earliest surviving examples of European quilting, the late 14th-century Sicilian Tristan Quilt, is also in the collection which also includes examples of various textiles designed by William Morris, including, embroidery, woven fabrics, tapestries (including The Forest tapestry of 1887), rugs and carpets, as well as pattern books and paper designs. The art deco period is covered by rugs and fabrics designed by Marion Dorn and a rug designed by Serge Chermayeff.

The collection also includes the Oxburgh Hangings, which were made by Mary, Queen of Scots and Bess of Hardwick. The Oxburgh Hangings are on permanent long-term loan at Oxburgh Hall.

Among the textiles from Asia are the early silk fragments collected by Aurel Stein in northwest China.

=== Theatre and performance ===
The V&A holds the national collection of performing arts in the UK, including drama, dance, opera, circus, puppetry, comedy, musical theatre, costume, set design, pantomime, popular music and other forms of live entertainment.

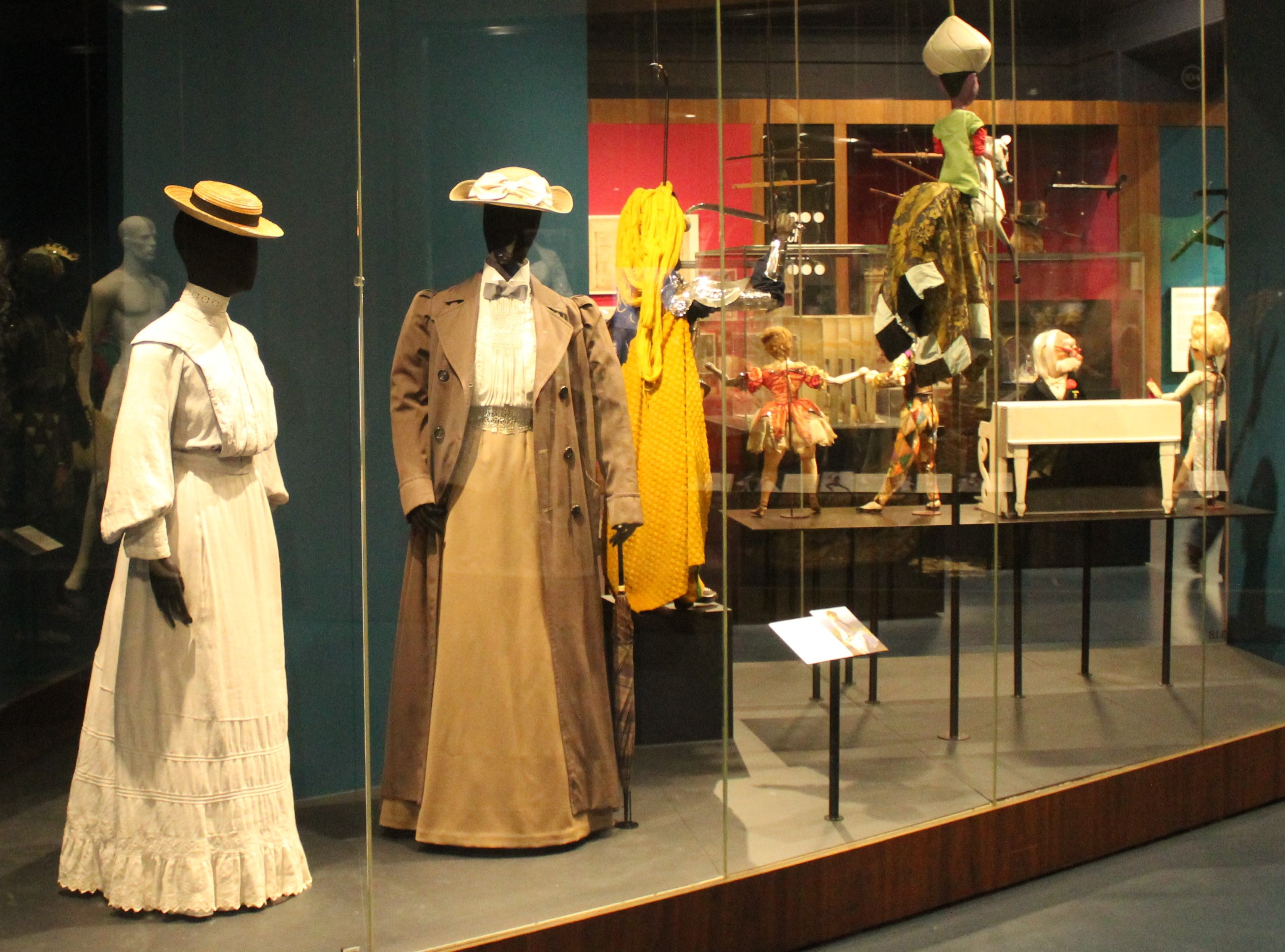
Theatre & Performance displays

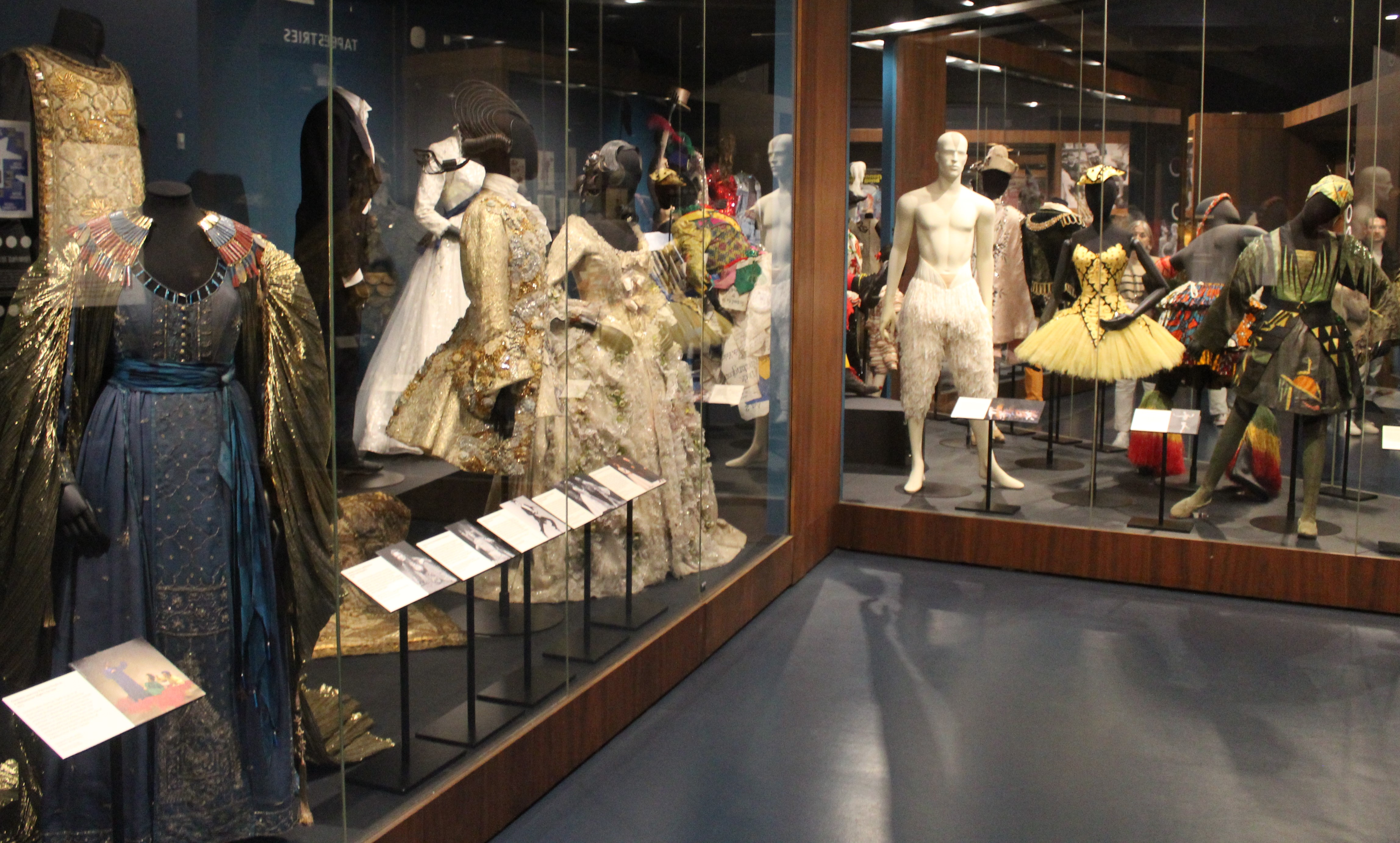
Theatre & Performance displays

The Theatre & Performance collections were founded in the 1920s when a private collector, Gabrielle Enthoven, donated her collection of theatrical memorabilia to the V&A. In 1974 two further independent collections were compiled to form a comprehensive performing arts collection. The collections were displayed at the Theatre Museum, which operated in Covent Garden until closing in 2007. The Theatre & Performance galleries opened at South Kensington in March 2009 tracing the production process of performance and include a temporary exhibition space. Objects displayed include costumes, set models, wigs, prompt books and posters.

The department holds significant archives documenting current practice and the history of performing arts. These include the English Stage Company at the Royal Court Theatre, the D'Oyly Carte Opera Company and the design collection of the Arts Council. Notable personal archives include those of Vivien Leigh, Peter Brook, Henry Irving and Ivor Novello.

Rock and pop are represented with the Harry Hammond photographic collection and the Jamie Reid archive documenting punk. Costumes include those worn by John Lennon, Mick Jagger, Elton John, Adam Ant, Chris Martin, Iggy Pop, Prince, Shirley Bassey and Roger Daltrey's Woodstock outfit. The Glastonbury Festival archive and the David Bowie archive are in the V&A East Storehouse.

=== Fashion ===
The costume collection is the most comprehensive in Britain, containing over 14,000 outfits plus accessories, dating from 1600 to the present. Some of the oldest works in the collection are medieval vestments, especially Opus Anglicanum. One of the most important pieces in the collection is the wedding suit of James II of England, which is displayed in the British Galleries. As everyday clothing from previous eras has not generally survived, the collection is dominated by fashionable clothes made for special occasions. In 1913 the V&A received the Talbot Hughes collection containing 1,442 costumes and items as a gift from Harrods following its display at the department store.

In 1971, Cecil Beaton curated an exhibition of 1,200 20th-century high-fashion garments and accessories. These included gowns worn by leading socialites such as Patricia Lopez-Willshaw, Gloria Guinness and Lee Radziwill, and the actors Audrey Hepburn and Ruth Ford. After the exhibition, Beaton donated most of the exhibits to the museum in the names of their former owners.

In 1999, V&A began a series of live catwalk events at the museum titled Fashion in Motion featuring pieces from historically significant fashion collections. The first show featured Alexander McQueen in June 1999. Since then, the museum has hosted recreations of various designer shows every year including Anna Sui, Tristan Webber, Elspeth Gibson, Chunghie Lee, Jean Paul Gaultier, Missoni, Gianfranco Ferré, Christian Lacroix, Kenzo and Kansai Yamamoto amongst others.

In 2002, the museum acquired the Costiff collection of 178 Vivienne Westwood costumes. Other famous designers with work in the collection include Coco Chanel, Hubert de Givenchy, Christian Dior, Cristóbal Balenciaga, Yves Saint Laurent, Guy Laroche, Irene Galitzine, Mila Schön, Valentino Garavani, Norman Norell, Norman Hartnell, Zandra Rhodes, Hardy Amies, Mary Quant, Christian Lacroix, Jean Muir and Pierre Cardin. The museum continues to acquire examples of modern fashion to add to the collection.

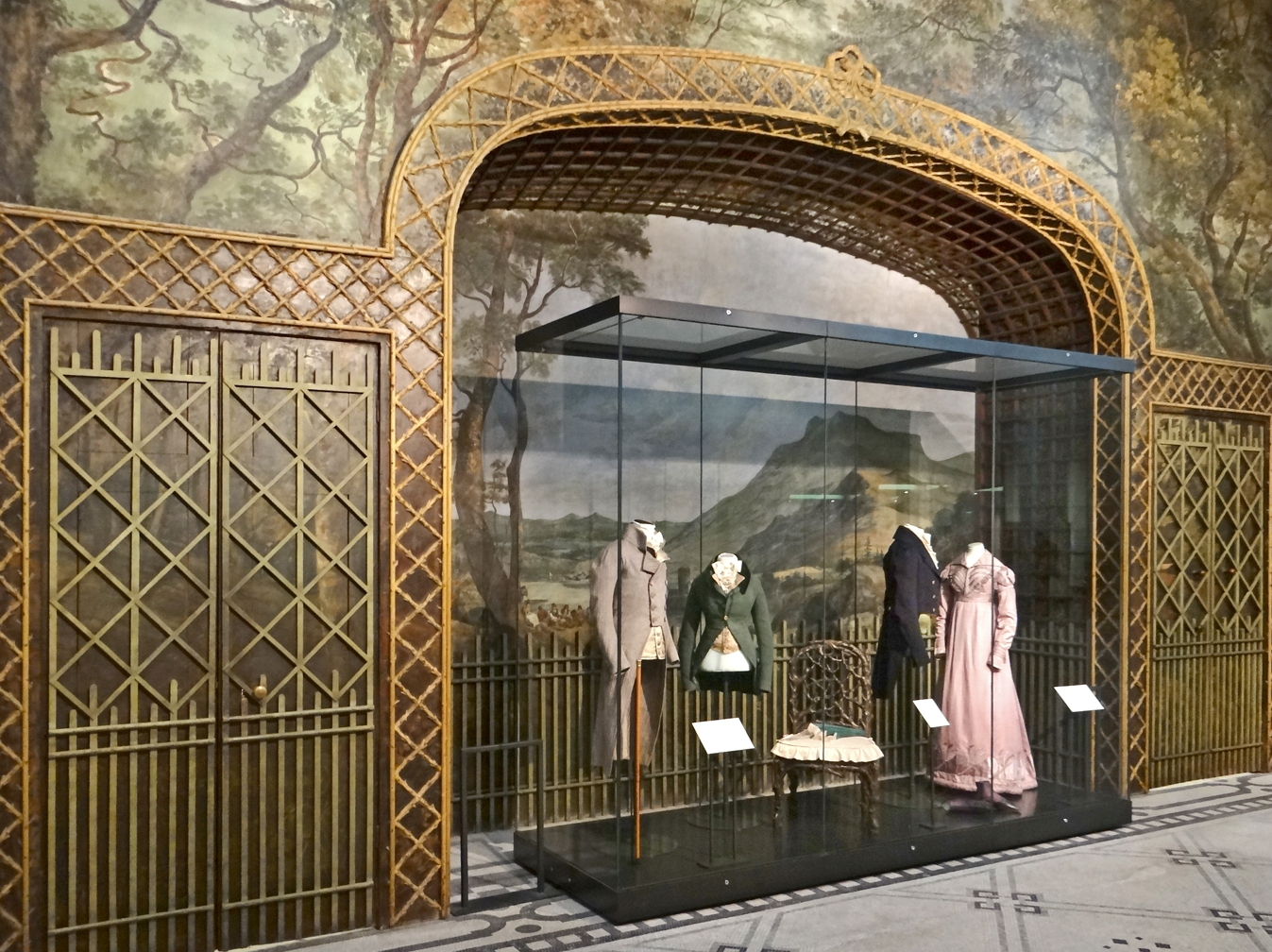

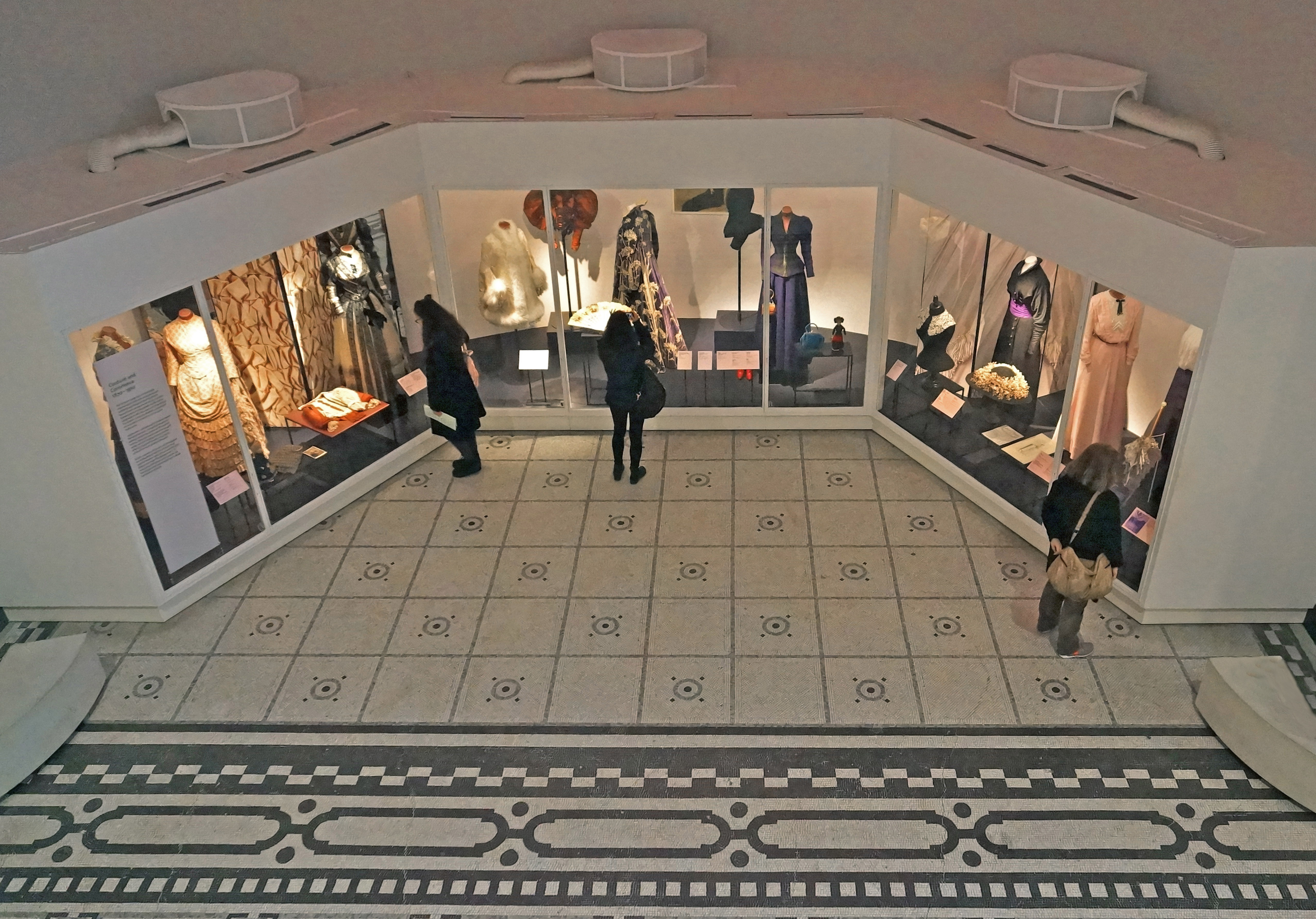
Fashion exhibits in Room 40 (closed until 2027)

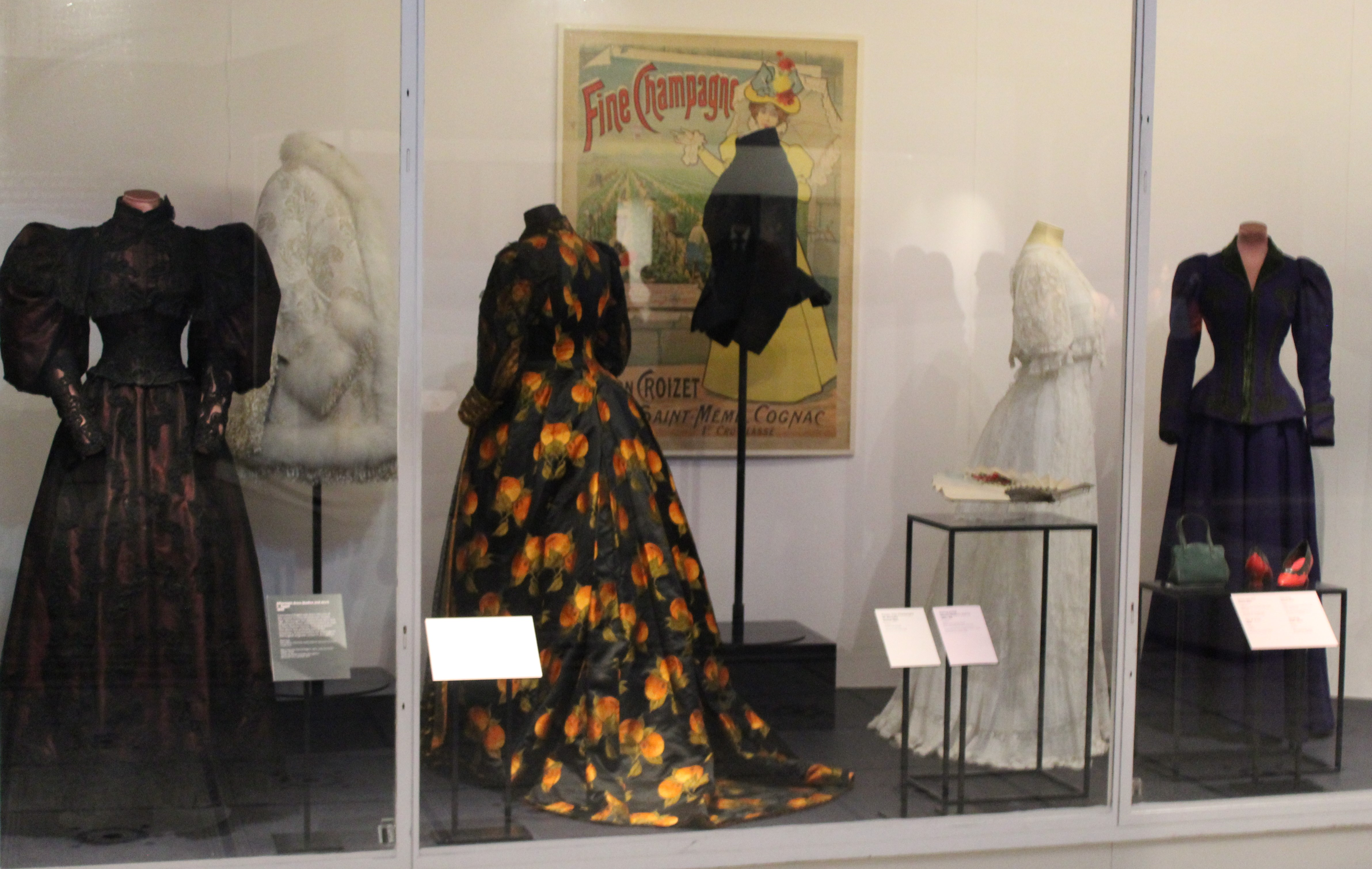

The V&A runs an ongoing textile and dress conservation programme. For example, in 2008, an important but heavily soiled, distorted and water-damaged 1954 Dior outfit called 'Zemire' was restored to displayable condition for the Golden Age of Couture exhibition.

The museum has a large collection of shoes; around 2000 pairs from different cultures around the world. The collection shows the chronological progression of shoe height, heel shape and materials, revealing just how many styles we consider to be modern have been in and out of fashion across the centuries.

== Departments ==
=== Education ===
The education department has wide-ranging responsibilities. It provides information for the casual visitor as well as for school groups, including integrating learning in the museum with the National Curriculum; it provides research facilities for students at degree level and beyond, with information and access to the collections. It also oversees the content of the museum's website in addition to publishing books and papers on the collections, research and other aspects of the museum.

Several areas of the collection have dedicated study rooms, these allow access to objects in the collection that are not currently on display, but in some cases require an appointment to be made.

V&A Publishing, within the education department, works to raise funds for the museum by publishing around 30 books and digital items each year. The company has around 180 books in print.

=== Research and conservation ===
The museum's research work includes:

- identification and interpretation of individual objects;
- individual studies and systematic research to develop the public understanding of the art and artefacts of different cultures;
- visitor research and evaluation to discover the needs of visitors and their experiences of the museum.

Since 1990, the museum has published research reports on all areas of the collection.

Conservation is responsible for the long-term preservation of the collections, and covers all the collections held by the V&A. Areas covered by the conservator's work include

- "preventive" conservation which include performing surveys, assessments and providing advice on the handling of items, correct packaging, mounting and handling procedures during movement and display to reduce risk of damaging objects.
- "interventive" conservation, this includes: cleaning and strengthening fragile objects, reveal original surface decoration and restore shape. Interventive treatment makes an object more stable and more attractive and comprehensible to the viewer when on display.

Other activities include controlling the museum environment (for example, temperature and light) and preventing pests (primarily insects) from damaging artefacts.

== Partnerships ==
The V&A works with a small number of partner organisations in Sheffield, Dundee and Blackpool to provide a regional presence.

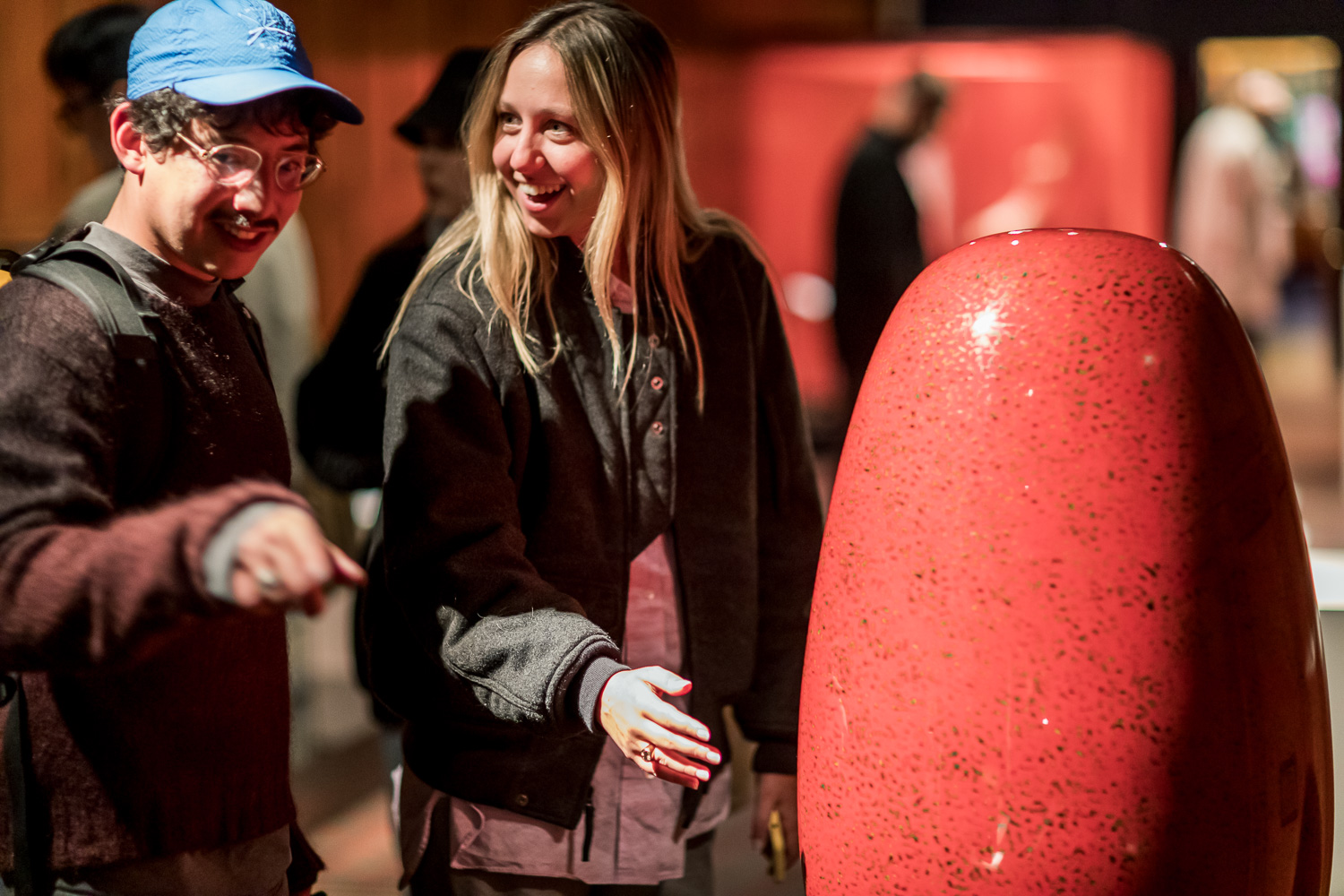
A London Design Festival exhibit in 2024

Plans for a new gallery in Blackpool were once considered. This follows earlier plans to move the theatre collection to a new £60m museum in Blackpool, which failed due to lack of funding. The V&A exhibits twice a year at the Millennium Galleries in partnership with Museums Sheffield.

The V&A is a key hub for the London Design Festival, hosting festival reflated exhibitions and events and has been described as the "true epicentre" of the festival itself.

The V&A is one of 17 museums across Europe and the Mediterranean participating in a project called Discover Islamic Art. Developed by the Brussels-based consortium Museum With No Frontiers, this online "virtual museum" brings together more than 1200 works of Islamic art and architecture into a single database.

== Prizes and residencies ==
=== Jameel Prize ===
In 2009, the V&A established the Jameel Prize, for "contemporary art and design inspired by Islamic tradition" in partnership with Art Jameel.

In 2022, a theme for the prize was introduced by co-curators of the prize Rachel Dedman and Tim Stanley, with the first theme Poetry to Politics. In the same year, open submissions were allowed for the first time, having previously been only open by a network of global nominators.

Previous winners are:

- 2009: Afruz Amighi
- 2011: Rachid Koraïchi
- 2013: Dice Kayek
- 2016: Ghulam Mohammad
- 2018: Mehdi Moutashar and Marina Tabassum (joint)
- 2021: Ajlan Gharem
- 2024: Ohida Khandakar

== Temporary exhibitions ==
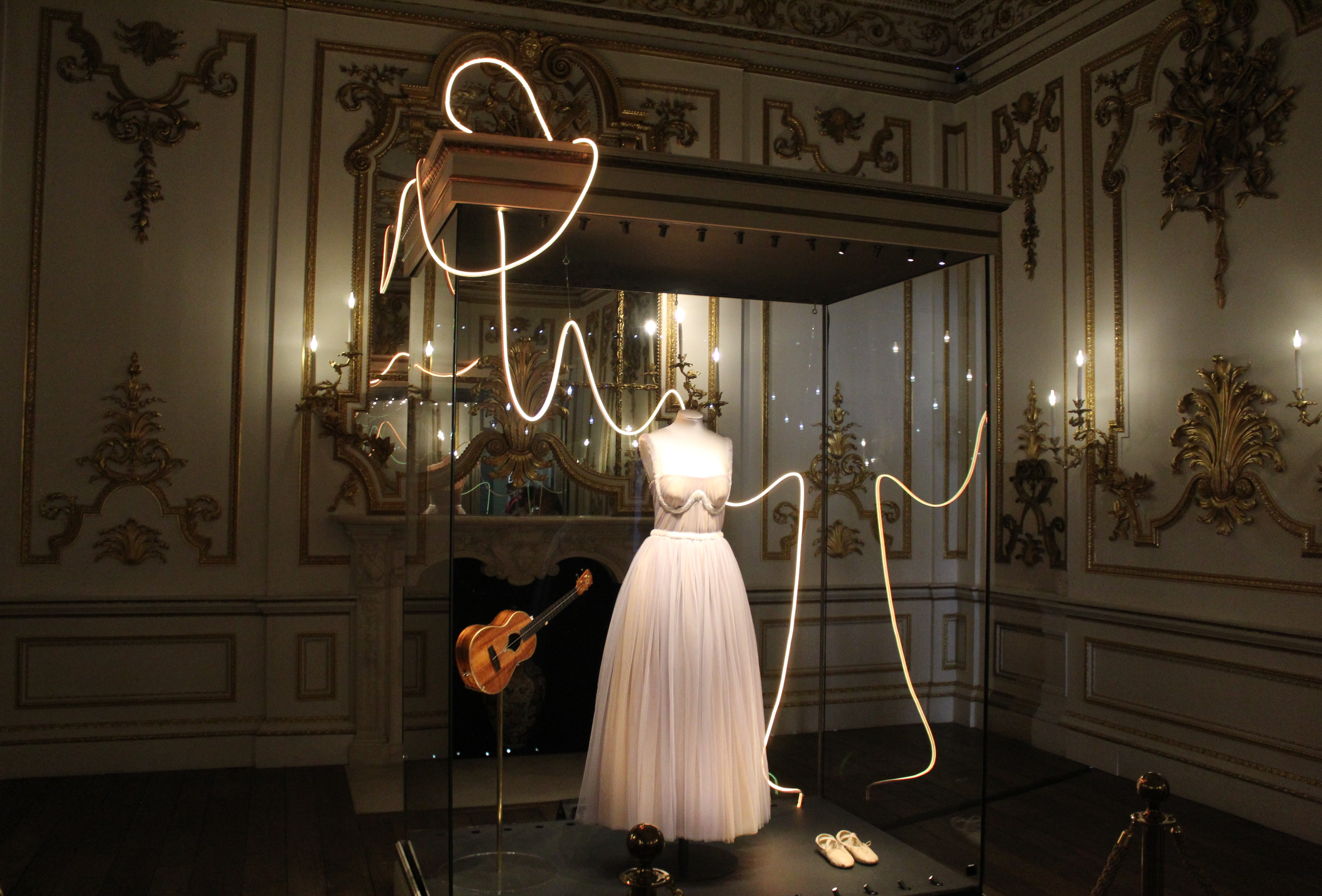
Taylor Swift Songbook Trial Speak Now exhibit, Summer 2024

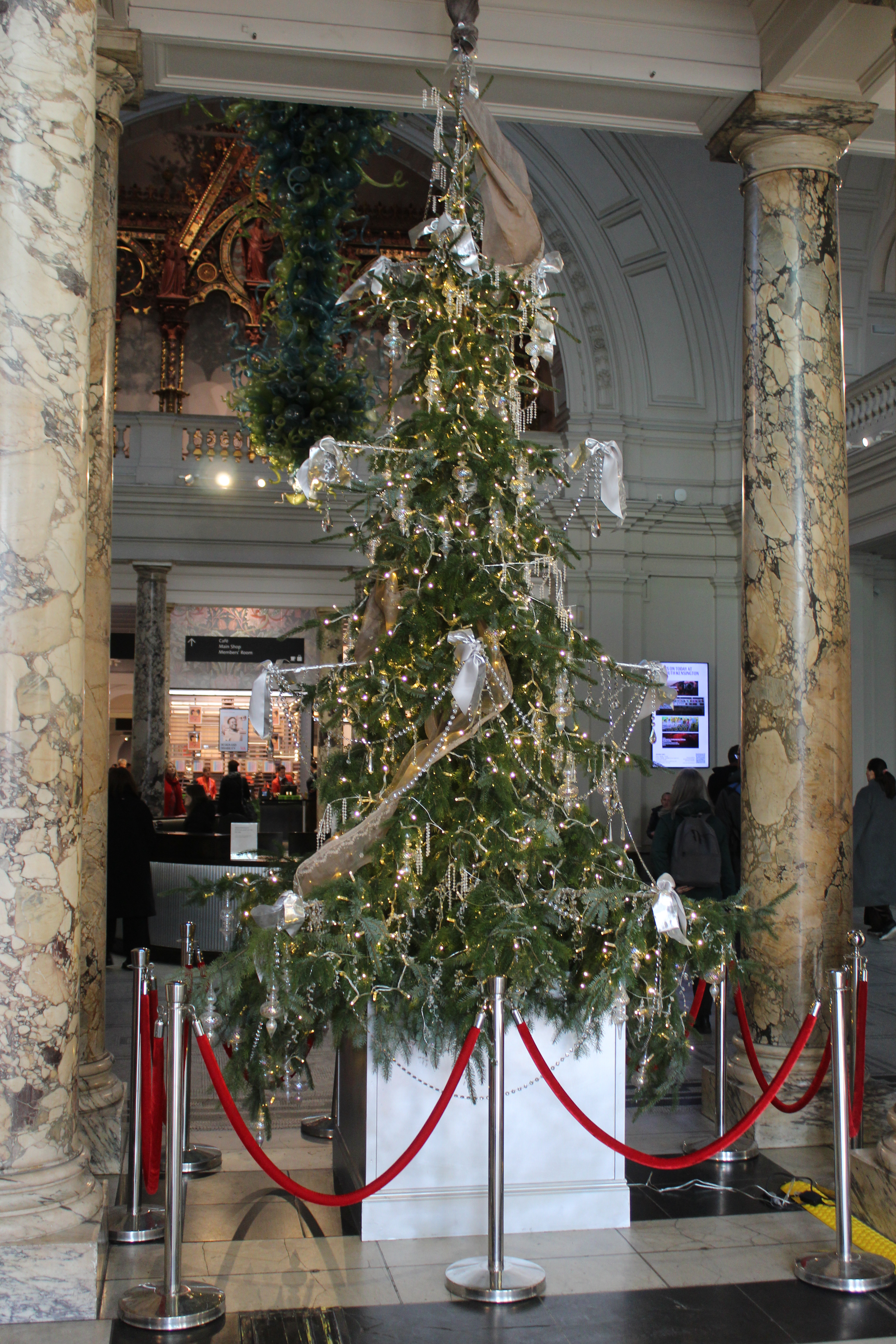
A Lustrous Noël by Shane Connolly and Co, the 2025 Christmas tree

The V&A has several dedicated galleries for hosting temporary exhibitions plus both the Ceramics Galleries and the Photography Centre have rooms for temporary exhibitions. A typical year will see more than a dozen different such exhibitions being staged. Notable examples include:

- Britain Can Make It, 1946
- Weaving for Walls. 1965-7
- Cinema India: The Art of Bollywood, 2002
- Hats: An Anthology, 2009
- Power of Making, 2011
- David Bowie Is, 2013
- Alexander McQueen: Savage Beauty, 2015, The V&A ranked second in London's top paid exhibitions in 2015 with this record-breaking show, which received 3,472 visitors in one day.
- Video games:Design/Play/Disrupt, 2018
- Food: Bigger Than the Plate, 2019
- Concealed Histories: Uncovering the Story of Nazi Looting, 2019 – 2021
- Taylor Swift Songbook Trail, 2024, Costumes worn by Taylor Swift during her career
- Fragile Beauty: Photographs from the Sir Elton John and David Furnish Collection, 2024
- Jewish Culture Month: Montefiore to Mentmore, Silver to Scandal, 2026

The Madejski Garden is also used for temporary exhibitions of works by artists and designers such as Georg Baselitz, Jeff Koons, Yung Ho Chang, United Visual Artists and the Campana brothers.

Each year, the museum commissions an artist or designer to create a Christmas tree for the Cromwell Road entrance rotunda. Past invitees have included Anna Lomax, Es Devlin, Kaffe Fassett, Gareth Pugh, Alexander McQueen with Tord Boontje, Matthew Williamson and Jasper Conran.

== Media ==
Starting in March 2020 BBC Two transmitted a series of six programmes depicting the back-stage work of the curators and restorers of the museum, entitled Secrets of the Museum.

The museum has featured in several films. These include The Ipcress File (1965), To Sir, with Love (1967), The Portrait of a Lady (1996) Hugo (2011), Trance (2013) and Red, White & Royal Blue (2023). The museum's former stores at Blythe House appeared in Tinker Tailor, Soldier Spy (2011).

== See also ==
- List of most visited art museums
- Director of the Victoria and Albert Museum
- Philippa Glanville
- V&A Digital Futures events on digital art
- List of design museums
- Patric Prince
- Royal Albert Memorial Museum – Museum in Exeter, Devon, England
