= List of Iranian women artists =

This is a list of women artists who were born in Iran or whose artworks are closely associated with that country.

== A ==
- Panteha Abareshi (born 1999), multidisciplinary artist, based in Los Angeles, California
- Samira Abbassy (born 1965), Iranian-born British painter, based in New York City
- Clara Abkar (1916–1996), Iranian-born Armenian miniaturist and gilder
- Golnar Adili (born 1976), artist based in Brooklyn, New York
- Hoda Afshar (born 1983), photographer based in Melbourne
- Shahla Aghapour, painter, sculptor, performance art, author, gallery director
- Shiva Ahmadi (born 1975), painter, video artist, and installation artist, based in the San Francisco Bay Area
- Shirin Aliabadi (1973–2018), visual artist, previously based in Tehran
- Samira Alikhanzadeh (born 1967), painter
- Morehshin Allahyari (born 1985), artist active since 2007, educator, based in Brooklyn
- Afruz Amighi (born 1974), sculptor, installation art, based in Brooklyn
- Nazgol Ansarinia (born 1979), painter
- Shahla Arbabi (born 1945), mixed media artist, based in Washington D.C.
- Akram Monfared Arya (born 1946), painter late in life, but best known as the second licensed female aircraft pilot of Iran
- Matilda Aslizadeh (born 1976), Iranian-born Canadian video artist, photography, and installation artist; based in Vancouver, Canada.

== B ==
- Nairy Baghramian (born 1971), sculpture and mixed media artist, based in Berlin
- Sonia Balassanian (born 1942), Armenian-Iranian painter, sculptor, installation artist, and curator; based in New York City and Yerevan
- Fatemeh Behboudi (born 1985), photographer, photojournalist

== C ==
- Parvine Curie (born 1936), French sculptor, of French and Iranian heritage
- Shaghayegh Cyrous (born 1987), interdisciplinary, activist, and social practice artist, based in San Francisco

== D ==
- Parisa Damandan (born 1967), photographer, art historian
- Iran Darroudi (born 1936–2021), contemporary artist
- Solmaz Daryani (born 1989), photographer
- Gohar Dashti (born 1980), photographer, video artist
- Bahar Dehkordi (born 1990), Rapper, theatre actress

== E ==
- Maryam Eisler, Iranian-born, London-based photographer, editor, and author
- Fatemeh Emdadian (born 1955), sculptor
- Soheila Esfahani, Iranian-born Canadian installation artist, sculptor, and educator; based in London, Ontario, Canada
- Parvaneh Etemadi (born 1947/1948), painter, draftsperson, printer and collagist; based in Tehran

== F ==
- Mitra Farazandeh (born c. 1976), painter and drawer, disability activist
- Atena Farghadani (born 1987), cartoonist, political activist
- Homa Vafaie Farley, Iranian-born potter and ceramist
- Tannaz Farsi (born 1974), sculptor and multidisciplinary artist, based in Eugene, Oregon
- Roya Farassat (born 1964), painter, sculptor, based in New York City
- Golnaz Fathi (born 1972), contemporary artist
- Bita Fayyazi (born 1962), sculptor and ceramist known for Iranian public art projects
- Chohreh Feyzdjou (1955–1996), sculpture, installation art
- Raheleh Filsoofi (born 1975), ceramist, painter
- Parastou Forouhar (born 1962), installation artist based in Germany
- Soraya French (born 1957), painter, writer

== G ==
- Pariyoush Ganji (born 1945), painter based in Tehran
- Mokarrameh Ghanbari (1928–2005), painter
- Shabnam K. Ghazi (born 1971), multidisciplinary artist, based in Toronto
- Shadi Ghadirian (born 1974), photographer, based in Tehran
- Bita Ghezelayagh (born 1966), sculptor based in Tehran and London
- Hengameh Golestan (born 1952), photographer

== H ==
- Nahid Hagigat (born 1943), illustrator, printmaker and painter in New York
- Fariba Hajamadi (born 1957), visual artist based in New York City
- Fatemeh Hamami (born 1989), disabled foot-and-mouth painter
- Gita Hashemi (born 1961), multidisciplinary artist based in Toronto, Canada
- Maryam Hashemi (born 1977), visual artist based in London
- Taraneh Hemami (born 1960), visual artist based in the San Francisco Bay Area
- Sooreh Hera (born 1973), photographer, artist, born in Tehran
- Mansooreh Hosseini (1926–2012), contemporary artist
- Shirazeh Houshiary (born 1955), installation artist, sculptor
- Sheree Hovsepian (born 1974), collage artist and photographer, based in New York City.

== J ==
- Rana Javadi (born 1953), photographer in Tehran.
- Pouran Jinchi (born 1959), calligrapher, painter, sculptor, active in New York since 1990s

== K ==
- Talieh Kamran (1930–2017), painter, musician, and poet; a pioneer of modern art in Iran
- Shokufeh Kavani (born 1970), contemporary painter based in Sydney
- Zhaleh Kazemi (1944–2003), painter
- Amineh Kazemzadeh (born 1963), painter
- Simin Keramati (born 1970), Iranian-born Canadian multidisciplinary visual artist and activist
- Sanam Khatibi (born 1979), Iranian-born contemporary artist based in Belgium
- Avish Khebrehzadeh (born 1969), Iranian-born American multidisciplinary visual artist
- Laleh Khorramian (born 1974), Iranian-American multidisciplinary visual artist
- Arghavan Khosravi (born 1984), Iranian-born American painter and sculptor
- Sahar Khoury (born 1973), American sculptor, of Iranian and Jordanian-Palestinian descent

== L ==
- Farideh Lashai (1944–2013), abstract painter, writer, and translator

== M ==
- Tala Madani (born 1981), Iranian-born American painter
- Nadia Maftouni (born 1966), painter, academic researcher, Islamic theologist, philosopher, and author
- Saba Masoumian (born 1982), contemporary artist
- Leyly Matine-Daftary (1937–2007), modernist artist, educator
- Sanaz Mazinani (born 1978), Iranian-Canadian multidisciplinary artist, works including installation art, photography
- Laleh Mehran, Iranian-American multimedia artist and professor
- Stacy Mehrfar, Iranian-American contemporary artist
- Alina Mnatsakanian (born 1958), Iranian-Armenian Switzerland-based visual artist
- Mandana Moghaddam (born 1962), Iranian-Swedish visual artist
- Neda Moridpour, Iranian-American artist, educator, active since 2012
- Noreen Motamed (born 1967), painter
- Nurieh Mozaffari (born 1960), Iranian-Canadian contemporary painter

== N ==
- Malekeh Nayiny (born 1955), artist based in Paris
- Shirin Neshat (born 1957), visual artist based in New York
- Mina Nouri (born 1951), painter
- Anahita Norouzi (born 1988), Iranian-Canadian artist
- Guity Novin (born 1944), Iranian-Canadian figurative painter, graphic designer

== O ==
- Farah Ossouli (born 1953), painter based in Iran

== R ==
- Tarlan Rafiee (born 1980), contemporary artist and curator
- Sara Rahbar (born 1976), contemporary mixed-media artist, based in New York
- Pantea Rahmani (born 1971), contemporary artist
- Raha Raissnia (born 1968), contemporary artist
- Anahita Razmi (born 1981), German-born contemporary artist of Iranian descent, based in London and Berlin
- Shokouh Riazi (1921–1965), modernist painter
- Roxx, British-born American tattoo artist of Iranian descent, based in Los Angeles

== S ==
- Behjat Sadr (1924–2009), impressionistic painter
- Afarin Sajedi (born 1979), surrealist painter, illustrator
- Maryam Salour (born 1954), sculptor, ceramist, painter
- Ashraf os-Saltaneh (1863–1914), princess, photographer of the Qajar era, and one of the earliest women photographers and journalists
- Zohreh Etezad Saltaneh (born 1962), painter, weaver, calligrapher, who works with her feet
- Golnar Servatian (born 1977), cartoonist, illustrator
- Massoumeh Seyhoun (1934–2010), painter, gallerist, curator
- Hadieh Shafie (born 1969), painter, based in the United States
- Shirana Shahbazi (born 1974), photographer, installation artist, based in Switzerland
- Naz Shahrokh (born 1969), miniature painting, sculptures, installation art, land art, and video art
- Monir Shahroudy Farmanfarmaian (1922–2019), best known for her mirror mosaics, sculptor, painter, textile designer
- Sara Shamsavari (born 1979), British-Iranian multidisciplinary artist
- Mojgan Shajarian (born 1970), Iranian painter, designer, musician
- Soheila Sokhanvari (born 1964), Iranian painter and multi-media artist, based in Cambridge, UK
- Sheida Soleimani (born 1990), Iranian-American multidisciplinary artist, based in Rhode Island

== T ==
- Taravat Talepasand (born 1979), Iranian-American painter and sculptor, based in Oregon.
- Newsha Tavakolian (born 1981), photographer, photojournalist

== Z ==
- Maryam Zandi (born 1946), photographer
- Leila Zelli (born 1981), Iranian-born Canadian installation artist and painter
- Niloofar Ziae (born 1962), painter, educator
- Minoosh Zomorodinia, Iranian-born American visual artist, curator, and educator in San Francisco

== See also ==
- List of Iranian artists
- List of Iranian painters
- Iranian modern and contemporary art
