= Motamed =

Motamed is a surname. Notable people with the surname include:

- Fatemeh Motamed-Arya (born 1961), Iranian actress
- Fereydoon Motamed (1917–1993), Iranian professor and linguist
- Hossein Khan Motamed (1893–1955), Iranian surgeon
- Juliette Motamed, British actress and musician
- Maurice Motamed (born 1945), Iranian politician
- Mohammad Bagheri Motamed (born 1986), Iranian taekwondo practitioner
- Nilou Motamed, American magazine editor and television personality
- Noreen Motamed (born 1967), Iranian-American artist and painter
