= Noreen Motamed =

- Born: Abadan, Iran
- Known for: Painting
- Movement: Abstract

Noreen Motamed (Persian: نورین معتمد) is an Iranian-American artist and painter, residing in Maryland.

== Biography ==
Daughter of linguist, Fereydoun Motamed. She was born in Abadan, Iran and attended primary and secondary school in Tehran and graduated in first place from Islamic Azad University with a Bachelor of Arts degree in Arts. She continued her postgraduate studies in Arts and once again graduated in first place from Alzahra University with a Master of Arts degree with concentration in painting.

She began painting as a professional artist in 1983. Starting with a figurative art style she then turned to abstract work, often depicting abstracted Persian female rug weavers and kilim weavers or humans and nature. Persian miniatures have been great sources of inspiration in her latest paintings. She has continued this style while in the United States with a western influence as it appears in some of her abstract figurative 2 collection. She has taught as an associate professor in Art at Shariaty Technical College in Tehran from 2008 until 2021. Noreen is currently active in producing paintings and artwork in the abstract-figurative realm. Her latest work themes are mostly inspired by nature with the use of both traditional and digital media.

== See also ==
- Islamic art
- Iranian art
- Islamic calligraphy
- List of Iranian artists

== Bibliography ==
- "Iranian Women Artists: Guity Novin, Sara Rahbar, Noreen Motamed, Sara Shamsavari, Mansooreh Hosseini, Mokarrameh Ghanbari, Iran Darroudi", ISBN 1155210328, (2010)
