= Afshin Naghouni =

Iranian-born British artist (born 1969)

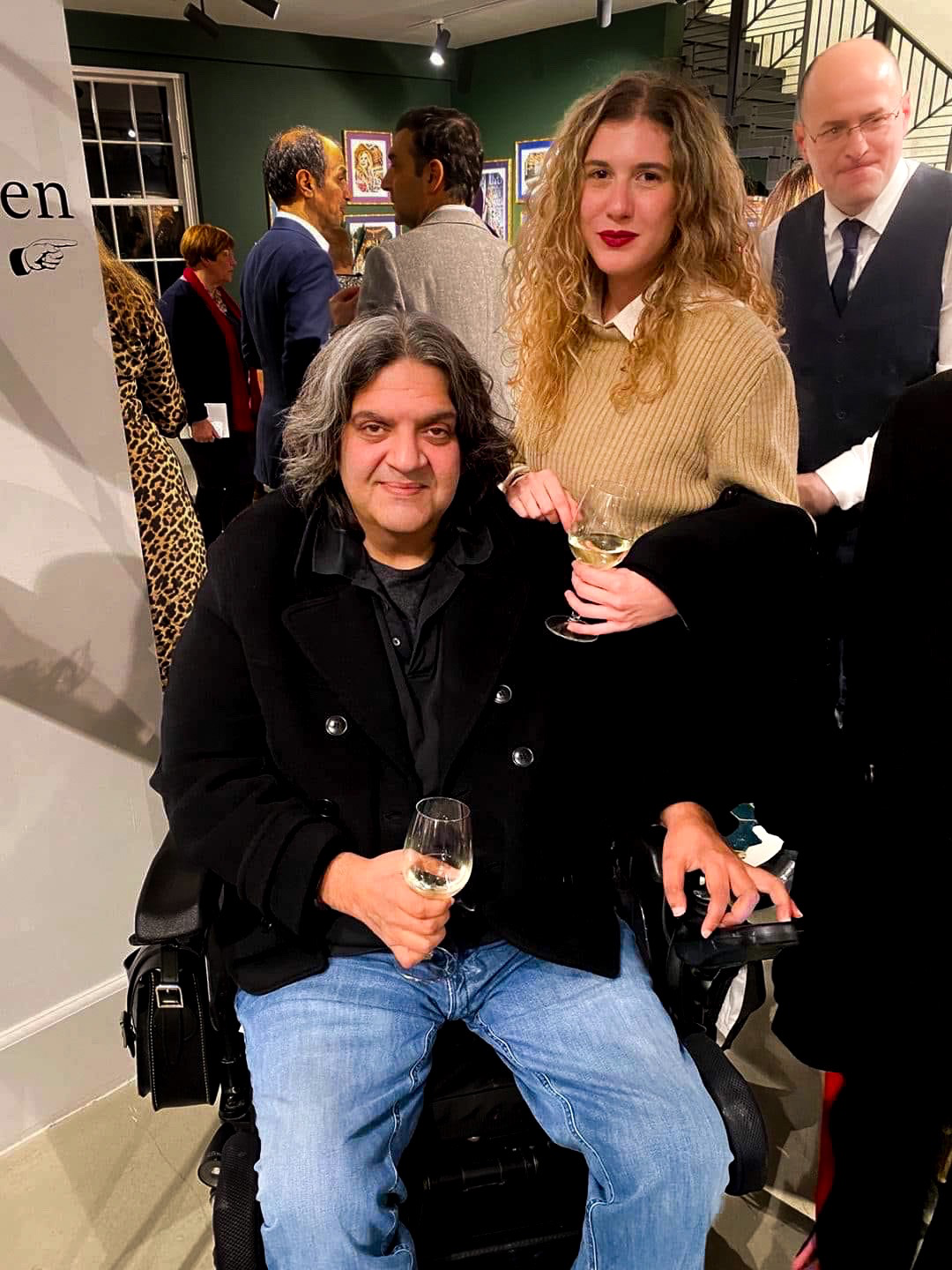
- Naghouni in 2021
- Born: Persian: افشین ناغونی; 25 August 1969 (age 57); Ahvaz, Iran
- Education: London Metropolitan University, Sir John Cass Department of Art, Media and Design
- Known for: Painting, Mixed media
- Notable work: National Property, The Abstraction of Reality, Universal Soldier, The Veil, Disillusions III, An Abstract Sense of Life (Series)
- Movement: Contemporary art
- Website: afshinnaghouni.com

Afshin "Ash" Naghouni (born 1969) is an Iranian-born British visual artist, known for his controversial, larger-than-life paintings. He works in an expressive and cubist style.

== Early life and education ==
Afshin Naghouni was born on August 25, 1969, at Ahvaz, Iran, to parents Sediheh (née Mohammadzaal) and Jahangir Naghouni. He started making art as a child. As a reward, if he had good marks in school, he would go to painting classes during the summer holiday. When Naghouni was 9 years old, he went to his first oil painting class and then began emulating the paintings of Caravaggio, John Constable and others. He won a number of regional and national painting competitions between the ages of nine and twelve.

Nagouni completed his postgraduate work at London Metropolitan University in the Sir John Cass Department of Art, Media, and Design.

When Naghouni was 24 years old, he was attending a birthday party when the building was attacked by the Islamic religious police and fell out of the building trying to escape. The fall damaged his spinal cord and left him in a wheelchair. The events surrounding Naghouni's fall were the subject of a TV documentary called Out of Focus (2014).

== Career ==
In the summer of 2021, Naghouni unveiled the series in London, entitled An Abstract Sense of Life.

In an interview with Maryam Eisler, Nagouni said he was inspired by Kiefer, Cecily Brown and Caravaggio. Regarding Kiefer and his larger pieces, Naghouni is inspired by Kiefer's ability to create amazing compositions within the sheer scale of his work, and adding that Kiefer is one of those few artists who has found the perfect balance between form and concept.

== Exhibitions ==
- 2017, Beyond the Ban: Contemporary Iranian Art, group exhibition, Susan Eley Gallery, New York City
- 2016, Art with an Iranian Flavour..” Capsule a selection of Contemporary Art, group exhibition, in partnership with Fiat Chrysler Motor Village UK and Monica Colussi, London
- 2016, Art for Youth, group exhibition, Mall Galleries, London; including the Afshin Naghouni Reach Prize
- 2015, Satire, solo exhibition, Hay Hill Gallery, London
- 2014, Objectification II, solo exhibition, Go Figurative, London
- 2013, Discerning Eye, group exhibition, Mall Galleries, London
- 2013, Peace from the Bottom of My Art, group exhibition, Opera Gallery, London

== Activism ==
Naghouni was the chairman of the Westminster Action Network on Disability.

Naghouni was one of 45 Iranian artists who demanded the releases of filmmakers Mohammad Nourizad and Jafar Panahi. Beyond the Ban was a collaboration between the Center for Human Rights in Iran and Susan Eley Fine Art, New York. It featured works from Naghouni and American-based Iranian artists including Shirin Neshat, Shoja Azari, and Hossein Fatemi.

=== Mahsa Amini protests ===
After the death of Mahsa Amini, protests erupted throughout Iran in 2022, then quickly in cities around the world. Very soon into the protests, there were renewed talks of bringing down the Islamic regime; moreover, such ambitions would need leaders.

On October 1, 2022, BBC News have an interview with Naghouni regarding to the protests in Trafalgar Square BBC News asked for Naghouni’s thoughts about the growing movement, Naghouni mentioned how powerful these protests were for human rights, globally; the protests were of utmost significance in the world.

On October 20, 2022, Naghouni talked to Roqe Media’s Jian Ghomeshi. In a short video clip from the interview, Naghouni discusses the conceivable end of Iran’s Islamic state. Confirmations are mounting that the protesters may be undermining the government. Naghouni explained that there have been many protests in Iran since the Iranian Revolution. Every time there’s a protest, there is talk that it could be the one that topples the Islamic regime. The death of Mahsa Amini was a cumulative breaking point. Naghouni was vehement and measured, in asserting that these latest protests would mark the beginning of the end for Iran's Islamic regime.

With global protests increasing following the death of Mahsa Amini, leading Iranian artists Afshin Naghouni, Soheila Sokhanvari, Fari Bradley, Bijan Daneshmand, Maryam Eisler and Afsoon, gathered in London to give their support to the work of Human Rights Watch in Iran, as well as two additional charities working with the people of Iran.

== See also ==
- List of British Iranians
