= Taravat =

Taravat (Persian: طراوت) is a Persian given name. Notable people with the name include:

- Taravat Talepasand (born 1979), American artist
- Taravat Khaksar (born 1993), Iranian karateka
