= Hushi =

Hushi may refer to:

== Place ==
- Huşi, city in Vaslui County, Romania
- Hu Shih (胡適; 1891–1962), Chinese philosopher and diplomat
- Hohhot (呼市), capital of Inner Mongolia, China
- Hushi, Putian (笏石镇), town in Xiuyu District, Putian, Fujian, China
- Hushi Town, Tianmen (胡市镇), Hubei, China

== Name ==
- Hushidar "Hushi" Mortezaie (born 1972), Iranian-American fashion designer
