= Nurieh Mozaffari =

Iranian–born Visual artist

- نوریه مظفری
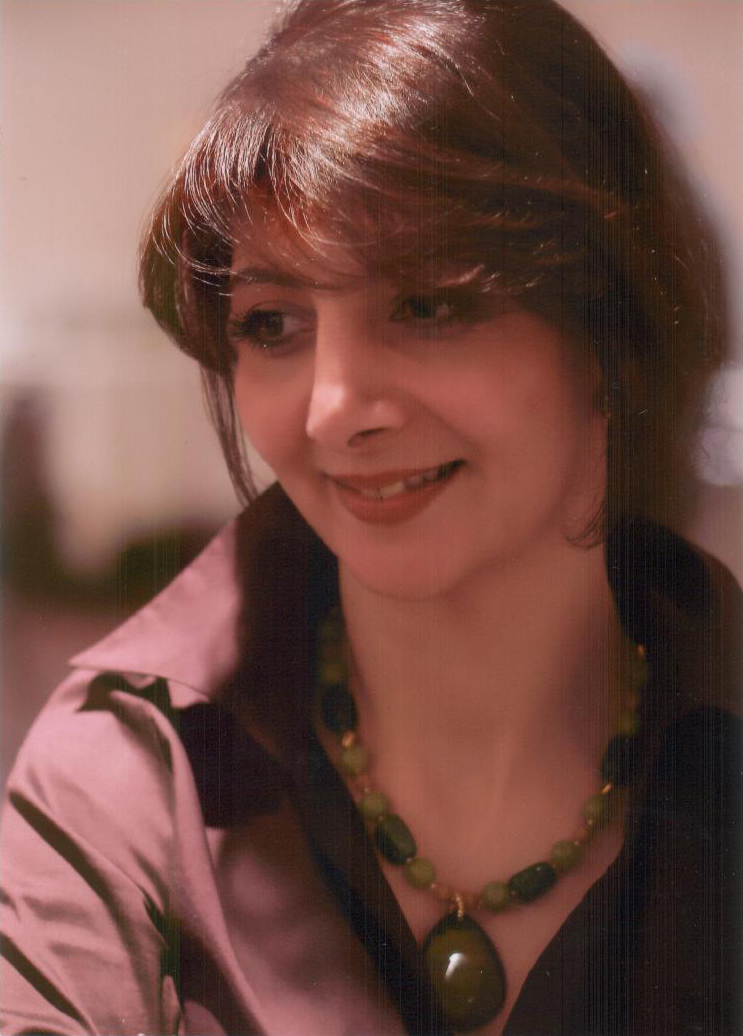
- Born: May 20, 1960 (age 66); Tehran, Imperial State of Iran
- Education: Alzahra University, Islamic Azad University
- Known for: Abstract art
- Website: nurieh-mozaffari.com

Nurieh Mozaffari (Persian: نوریه مظفری; born May 20, 1960) is an Iranian–born contemporary painter.

== Early life and education ==
Nurieh Mozaffari was born in 1960 in Tehran, Iran. She grew up in the city of Rudsar in Gilan province in northern Iran.

Mozaffari studied at Alzahra University in Tehran and under the supervision of painter Aydin Aghdashloo. Upon receiving her B.A. degree in 1989, she pursued her M.A. degree at Islamic Azad University, and graduated in 1996.

In 1998, Mozaffari emigrated to Vancouver, British Columbia, Canada and obtained a diploma in jewelry design. In 2006, her work was being shown in Vancouver art galleries.

== Career ==
Mozaffari has worked as a lecturer at Islamic Azad University. In her art career, she has worked with many Iranian contemporary art figures, including Shahla Habibi, Bahman Boroujeni, Ruyin Pakbaz, Homayoun Salimi, Mehdi Hosseini, and Hannibal Alkhas.

Mozaffari has held at least over 20 solo exhibitions of her works, which included the Tehran Museum of Contemporary Art, Sad Abod museum in Tehran, Nivran museum in Tehran, Shohada museum in Tehran, Azadi museum in Tehran, Pacific Museum of Earth in Vancouver, and Institute du monde arabe in Paris (Solo exhibition).

== Works ==
Although Mozaffari has worked in both realist and modern styles, her pieces have mostly been in abstract expressionism. She is known for the use of Persian cultural symbolism in her compositions. Influence of modern Iranian symbols and elements from the country's history are widely visible in many of Mozaffari’s paintings.

Mozaffari's mixed media pieces include photographs of people and places that are printed on canvas and then painted over. In her Paris Révé collection, dome-top statues and sunlight in larger fields of Paris are punctuated by gold gestures. Pictures of real places are blurred and partially obscured and depict recollections. Her larger, bolder paintings add bright orange and darker blue to the artist's foggy palette.

== Embassy of France ==
Voice of America writer Mehrnaz Samami devoted a page to Nourieh Mozafari. She spent a little time with her in her studio. The essence of it has been translated below:

Mozaffari held an exhibition at the French Embassy where she displayed her paintings. The exhibition was hosted by Susan Callaway, owner of Callaway Fine Art Gallery. The exhibition was called “Unforgettable,” and it included several pieces of Iranian women who were influential in Mozaffari’s life.

The attendees included a poet, a singer and Farah Pahlavi, widow of Mohammad Reza Shah Pahlavi who was the last Shah of Iran. Farah was successively Queen and Empress (Shahbanu) of Iran from 1959 to 1979.

In Mozaffari’s Facebook photos, it shows they are now good friends. (Good to link Facebook after this article builds more)

Around 2010, Mozaffari moved near Washington D.C. and now spends most of the year in the United States. Since then, she has exhibited her paintings in several exhibitions near the nations capitol and has sold some of them.

Mozaffari says she can’t imagine her life without painting. Her work gives her a strong sense of self and allows her to share her innermost truth with those around her.

== See also ==
- List of Iranian women artists
