= TransGlobe Publishing =

British publishing house

TransGlobe Publishing Logo

TransGlobe Publishing is a London-based publisher that specialises in art and lifestyle photobooks. It was founded in 2003 by Director Hossein Amirsadeghi, who acts as publisher and author.

== Publications ==
TransGlobe's publications fall into three main categories, the majority of which are co-published with Thames & Hudson:

- Lifestyle publications which include original photography and interviews on a variety of characters that embody a particular city or genre.
- Contemporary art publications which include overviews of specific regions or countries in the art world.
- Artist studio publications which include original photography and interviews with foremost artists.

The photobooks focussed on artist's studio are particularly noteworthy due to the inclusion of rare interviews conducted with artists and art world personalities, such as Frank Auerbach, Maggi Hambling, Gavin Turk and Gustav Metzger (see: Sanctuary: Britain's Artists and their Studios (2012)), and Jeff Koons, John Baldessari, and Shirin Neshat (see: Art Studio America: Contemporary Artist’s Spaces (2013)).

TransGlobe's recent hardback, Voices: East London (2017), features a mix of portraits and interviews with East London creatives, such as actor Jonny Woo and gallerists Maureen Paley and Victoria Miro, profiled by artist Maryam Eisler.

These volumes include essays written by many notable art critics and historians, including Iwona Blazwick, Director of Whitechapel Gallery, former Turner Prize judge Richard Cork, and journalist Tom Morton.

== Arts & Patronage Summit ==
In 2012 TransGlobe Publishing hosted the first Art & Patronage Summit, which began as an event focused on the visual arts and creativity in the greater Middle East, including North Africa, Iran, and Turkey.

The Summit consisted of panel discussions held at the British Museum and the Royal College of Art, a screening of Pia Getty's film 'Axis of Light' at the Institute of Contemporary Arts, and a charity auction held at Sotheby's. Notable speakers included Chris Dercon, Director of Tate Modern, and Martin Roth, Director of the Victoria and Albert Museum.

== Notable publications ==
- Amirsadeghi, Hossein. Contemporary Art Colombia (2017). London: Thames & Hudson; TransGlobe Publishing. ISBN 0500970769
- Eisler, Maryam. Voices: East London (2017). London: Thames & Hudson; TransGlobe Publishing. ISBN 978-0500970850
- Amirsadeghi, Hossein and Eisler, Maryam. London Burning: Portraits from a Creative City (2015). London: Thames & Hudson; TransGlobe Publishing. ISBN 9780500970713
- Amirsadeghi, Hossein and Petitgas, Catherine. Contemporary Art Mexico (2014). London: Thames & Hudson; TransGlobe Publishing. ISBN 0500974772
- Amirsadeghi, Hossein and Eisler, Maryam. Art Studio America: Contemporary Artist’s Spaces (2013). London: Thames & Hudson; TransGlobe Publishing. ISBN 9780500970539
- Amirsadeghi, Hossein and Eisler, Maryam. Sanctuary: Britain's Artists and their Studios (2012). London: Thames & Hudson; TransGlobe Publishing. ISBN 9780500977071
- Amirsadeghi, Hossein et al. New Vision: Arab Contemporary Art in the 21st Century (2011). London: Thames & Hudson; TransGlobe Publishing.ISBN 095679422X
- Amirsadeghi, Hossein. Art & Patronage: The Middle East (2010). London: Thames & Hudson; TransGlobe Publishing. ISBN 9780500977040
- Amirsadeghi, Hossein. Unleashed: Contemporary Art from Turkey (2010). London: Thames & Hudson; TransGlobe Publishing. ISBN 9780500977026
