= Samira Alikhanzadeh =

Iranian artist

- سمیرا علیخان‌زاده
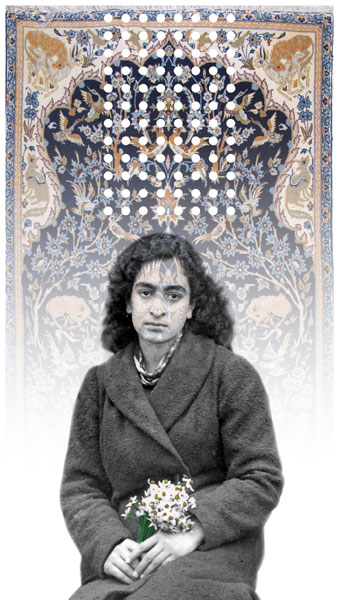
- No.7 from the Persian Carpet series-digital print on Perspex, Borchalou Rug and mirror fragments mounted on board-162x218cm-unique-2011 Assar Art Gallery
- Born: 1967 (age 58–59); Tehran, Pahlavi Iran
- Education: Alzahra University, Islamic Azad University
- Known for: Mixed media art

Samira Alikhanzadeh (Persian: سمیرا علیخان‌زاده; born 1967) is an Iranian visual artist and painter. She lives and works in Tehran.

== Biography ==
Born in Tehran, she began painting under the supervision of Aydin Aghdashloo. She studied painting at Alzahra University and earned a BFA degree in painting in 1996 and an MA degree in painting in 1998 at Islamic Azad University.

Alikhanzadeh uses acrylic paint, mirrors and old found images, mainly family photographs, in her work. She uses these images from the past to explore identity and reality in modern Iran. Some works also include actual Persian carpets to evoke the past.

Alikhanzadeh's work has appeared in exhibitions in the United Arab Emirates, Canada, the United States and France. Her art is in the collection of the Los Angeles County Museum of Art. Her work was in the fifth Painting Biennial of the Tehran Museum of Contemporary Art in 2000.

== See also ==
- List of Iranian women artists
