= Afruz Amighi =

Iranian-born American sculptor and installation artist (born 1974)

- افروز عمیقی
- Born: 1974 (age 51–52); Tehran, Iran
- Education: Barnard College (BA); New York University (MFA)
- Occupations: sculptor, installation artist
- Awards: Jameel Prize (2009)
- Website: www.afruzamighi.com

Afruz Amighi (born 1974; Persian: افروز عمیقی) is an Iranian-born American sculptor and installation artist. Her work has been exhibited in the United States, Europe and in the Middle East. She is based in Brooklyn, New York.

== Early life ==
Amighi was born in 1974 in Tehran, Iran, to a Jewish-American mother and a Zoroastrian-Iranian father. She was raised in New York City.

In 1997, Amighi graduated from Barnard College with a BA in political science. In 2007, she completed an MFA degree at New York University.

== Career ==
In 2013, Amighi's work was exhibited at the 55th Venice Biennale.

In 2017, a series of Amighi's feminist sculptures were presented at the Sophia Contemporary Gallery, London.

In 2018, the Frist Art Museum in Nashville, presented her first solo museum exhibition.

Amighi was the artist-in-residence in partnership with the Intersections program at the Department of Art and Art History at the University of Hawai’i at Manoa.

== Awards ==
Amighi has received several awards and fellowships including:

- 2009: Jameel Prize for Middle Eastern contemporary art, Victoria and Albert Museum, London
- 2011: Fellowship in sculpture, New York Foundation for the Arts.

== Exhibitions ==
=== Solo ===
Year	Title	Institution	Location	Ref
2013	55th Venice Biennale		Venice	
2017		Sophia Contemporary Gallery	London	

=== Group ===
Year	Title	Institution	Location	Ref
2013		Frist Art Museum	Nashville	

== Collections ==
Amighi's work is in several collections, including:

- Metropolitan Museum of Art
- Houston Museum of Fine Art
- Victoria and Albert Museum
- The Newark Museum of Art
- Devi Foundation

== See also ==
- List of Iranian women artists
