= Yadollah Ordokhani =

Iranian mathematician

- یدالله اردوخانی
- Born: Tafresh
- Education: Amirkabir University of Technology (PhD), Tarbiat Modares University (MS), Arak University (BS)
- Scientific career
- Fields: mathematics
- Institutions: Alzahra University

Yadollah Ordokhani is an Iranian mathematician and Professor of Mathematics at Alzahra University. He is among the most-cited Iranian researchers and is known for his works on fractional wavelet, optimal control problem, numerical analysis, integral equations and time-delay systems. He is a former head of Iran's National Elites Foundation-Tehran Branch and a former Deputy Head of Research at Alzahra University.

== Books ==
- Y. Ordokhani, A. Gilani, M. Shahrezaee. Engineering mathematics part 1: Fourier analysis and partial differential equations, Tafresh: Tafresh University
