= Pouran Jinchi =

Iranian-born American artist (born 1959)

- پوران جین چی
- Born: 1959 (age 66–67); Mashhad, Imperial State of Iran
- Education: George Washington University (B.S), University of California, Los Angeles, Art Students League of New York
- Known for: Deconstructed Islamic calligraphy and sculpture
- Website: pouranjinchi.com

Pouran Jinchi (Persian: پوران جین چی; born 1959) is an Iranian-born American visual artist. She is known for her abstract, calligraphy-based contemporary visual art. Jinchi lives in New York City.

== Early life and education ==
Pouran Jinchi was born in 1959, in Mashhad, Pahlavi Iran.

Trained as a calligrapher in Mashad, Iran, Jinchi received a bachelor of science in 1982 in civil engineering, from George Washington University, Washington, D.C.; before studying sculpture and painting at the University of California, Los Angeles, California in 1989; and studio painting at the Art Students League of New York, New York City in 1993.

== Art career ==
Jinchi borrows from her Iranian cultural traditions of literature and calligraphy to pursue her own aesthetic investigations. Jinchi's work often employs a mixture of calligraphy and abstract expressionism that intertwines Islamic geometry, Iranian traditions and contemporary aesthetics, with a unique lyricism. Her early Poetry paintings are both abstract and literal presentations of poems in which texts are morphed beyond recognition into flowing, anthropomorphic shapes. Having been trained in calligraphy, she finds the relation between words and forms, natural or non-objective, deeply intertwined. Jinchi's recent work reflects an increasingly detailed focus on the form of language as subject matter. Her calligraphy work is in Persian, but deconstructed and ineligible to read, even for native Persian-speakers.

Jinchi has exhibited extensively and has had eight solo exhibitions in New York alone. Recent exhibitions include a two-person show at Frieze Art Fair, London (2011) and solo exhibitions at Art Projects International, New York (2012), The Third Line, Dubai (2010), the Leila Heller Gallery, New York (2011), and the Vilcek Foundation, New York (2008).

Her work has also been exhibited at the Asian Art Museum of San Francisco, Herbert F. Johnson Museum of Art, Museum of Fine Arts, Houston, Brooklyn Museum and the Queens Museum of Art. Jinchi was included in Iran Inside Out at the Chelsea Art Museum (2009) and most recently in New Blue and White at the Museum of Fine Arts, Boston (2013).

== Collections ==
Her work is represented in major collections including the Metropolitan Museum of Art, New York City; Museum of Fine Arts Houston; Herbert F. Johnson Museum of Art, New York City; Farjam Collection, Dubai; Brooklyn Museum, New York City; Arthur M. Sackler Gallery, Smithsonian Institution, Washington D.C.; and the Federal Reserve Bank, New York.

== See also ==
- Islamic art
- Iranian art
- Islamic calligraphy
- List of Iranian artists
- List of Iranian women artists
