= Hushidar Mortezaie =

Iranian-born American fashion designer

- Born: 1972 (age 53–54); Tehran, Iran
- Other names: Hushi Mortezaie
- Education: University of California, Berkeley, Parsons School of Design, Fashion Institute of Technology
- Occupations: Fashion designer, artist, collage artist, graphic designer
- Known for: Fashion

Hushidar "Hushi" Mortezaie (born 1972) is an Iranian-born American fashion designer, artist, collagist, and graphic designer. He co-founded the fashion label Michael and Hushi. Mortezaie is best known for his over-the-top Persian-aesthetic collaged textiles and fashion designs, often exploring glamour, politics, and kitsch. He has lived and worked in New York City, San Francisco, and Los Angeles.

== Early life and education ==
Hushidar Mortezaie was born in 1972 in Tehran, Iran. He identifies as queer. In 1975, at the age of 3, due to political reasons his family moved to Marin County in California where he was raised. In 1990, he met Michael Sears while they were both living in San Francisco. He was attending the University of California, Berkeley and studying fine art.

== Career ==
In 1994, Mortezaie moved with Sears to New York City. He attended classes at Parsons School of Design, followed by classes at Fashion Institute of Technology. Mortezaie was mentored and worked as a fashion buyer under Patricia Field.

In 1997, Sears and Mortezaie opened an East Village boutique, Sears and Robot. They made clothes that existed as a hybrid of Western and Middle Eastern fashion. The initial clientele was primarily club kids and celebrities, and this evolved into contemporary fashion, couturier, and runways. The shared the fashion label, Michael and Hushi, and this became the rebranded name of the storefront after pressure from Sears Roebuck. They held a fashion show in the 1990s with models walking down the runway holding machine guns, wearing traditional Iranian chadors. Their fashion was shown on the television series, Sex And The City (season 3, episode 43) with a dress worn by Sarah Jessica Parker; and in the film Fight Club (1999), with a printed shirt worn by Brad Pitt. Michael and Hushi participated in the exhibition of artist hand painted boots, Dr. Martens Original Since 1960 (2003) at a gallery at 537 West 26th Street in New York City. Michael and Hushi fashion pieces are sought after and collected, including by vintage dealer Olivia Haroutounian.

Mortezaie's first art exhibition was in 2009 at the Morono Kiang Gallery in Los Angeles. His art work has been part of notable art exhibitions including Theory of Survival: Fabrications (2014), curated by Taraneh Hemami at Southern Exposure; The Third Muslim (2018), curated by Zulfikar Ali Bhutto Jr. and Yas Ahmed at SOMArts in San Francisco; Occupy Me: Branding Culture, Identity & The Politics of Fashion (2018) at Helen Lindhurst Fine Arts Gallery in Los Angeles; and Ctrl + Alt + Fashion: Manufacturing Iranian Identity (2019) at Johns Hopkins School of Advanced International Studies. Mortezaie has worked with artist Zulfikar Ali Bhutto on the design of performance costumes.

== See also ==
- List of Iranian artists
- Bijan
- Arefeh Mansouri
- Taravat Talepasand
