= Shiva Ahmadi =

Iranian-American artist (born 1975)

- Born: 1975 (age 50–51); Tehran, Imperial State of Iran
- Education: Cranbrook Academy of Arts, MFA; Azad University, BFA
- Known for: Drawing, painting, animation

Shiva Ahmadi (born 1975; Persian: شیوا احمدی) is an Iranian-born American artist, known for her paintings, videos, and installations. Her work has been exhibited at galleries and museums in North America and the Middle East.

== Biography ==
Ahmadi was born in Tehran, Iran in 1975. Her upbringing, which is reflected in her art, was marked by the Iranian Revolution and the Iran–Iraq War. She obtained a bachelor of fine art from Azad University in 1998 and right after moved to USA to pursue her graduate studies. She attended Wayne State University in Detroit, Michigan and received a Master of Art Degree in Drawing (2000) and a Master of Fine Arts in Drawing (2003). In 2003, she attended an artist residency at the Skowhegan School of Painting and Sculpture. In 2005, Ahmadi obtained her second MFA, in painting from Cranbrook Academy of Art. Ahmadi was appointed as an Associate Professor of Art at the University of California, Davis in 2015.

== Career ==
Ahmadi's practice borrows from the artistic traditions of Iran and the Middle East to critically examine contemporary political tensions. Incorporating cultural symbols Ahmadi has taken a critical look at current social and political issues.

Ahmadi works across a variety of media, including watercolor painting, sculpture, and video animation; consistent through her pieces are the ornate patterns and vibrant colors drawn from Persian, Indian and Middle Eastern art. In her carefully illustrated worlds, formal beauty complicates global legacies of violence and oppression. These playful fantasy realms are upon closer inspection macabre theaters of politics and war: watercolor paint bloodies the canvas, and sinister global machinations play out in abstracted landscapes populated by faceless figures and dominated by oil refineries and labyrinthine pipelines. Known for her achievements in painting, her later career has been marked by the use of video-animation. Her first animation Lotus was exhibited extensively in US and around the world and gained recognition from many critics and curators. Her latest animation titled Ascend (2017) was inspired by the death of Aylan Kurdi and Syrian refugee crisis in 2015. It was acquired by the Asian Art Museum in San Francisco.

Ahmadi's work is included in the collections of the Museum of Contemporary Art in Los Angeles, the Asia Society Museum, the Detroit Institute of Arts, the DePaul Art Museum, the Morgan Library & Museum, the Herbert F. Johnson Museum, the Asian Art Museum in San Francisco, the TDIC Corporate Collection in the United Arab Emirates, and the Farjam Collection in Dubai. Her piece Pipes, a five-feet wide watercolor, was acquired by the Metropolitan Museum of Art in 2014.

In 2016, she was awarded the Anonymous Was A Woman award.

In 2018, Ahmadi was awarded a fellowship at the Civitella Ranieri Art Residency in Umbria, Italy.

== Exhibitions ==
- 2024 – Strands of Resilience, Manetti Shrem Museum
- 2023 – Rising Sun: Artists in an Uncertain America, Pennsylvania Academy of Fine Arts
- 2023 – Shiva Ahmadi: The Courage of Eve, Gallery Rosenfeld, London
- 2023 – Shiva Ahmadi: Unbound, Saint Joseph's Art Society
- 2022 – From Moment to Movement, Manetti Shrem Museum of Art
- 2021 – Inspirations from the Ancient, Gallery Rosenfeld, London
- 2021 – With Eyes Opened: Cranbrook Academy of Art Since 1932, Cranbrook Museum of Art
- 2021 – A Boundless Drop to a Boundless Ocean, Orlando Museum of Art, Florida
- 2020 – Unrealism, Shoshana Wayne Gallery, Los Angeles
- 2020 –The Body Politic, Haines Gallery
- 2020 – Labyrinths, Elaine L. Jacob Gallery
- 2019 – Shrine Room Projects, Rubin Art Museum, New York City
- 2019 – How the Light Gets In, Johnson Museum of Art, Ithaca
- 2019 – Once at Present, Minnesota Street Project, San Francisco
- 2018 – Revolution Generations, Arab Museum of Modern Art, Qatar
- 2018 – Catastrophe and the Power of Art, Mori Art Museum, Tokyo
- 2018 – Burning Song, Haines Gallery, San Francisco
- 2018 – This Land Is Whose Land?, Sun Valley Center For the Arts, Idaho
- 2018 – Catastrophe and the Power of Art, Mori Art Museum, Tokyo, Japan
- 2017 – Ascend, Leila Heller Gallery, New York, NY
- 2017 – Rebel, Jester, Mystic, Poet: Contemporary Persians – Aga Khan Museum, Toronto, Ontario
- 2016 – Global/Local 1960–2015: Six Artists from Iran – Grey Art Gallery, New York, City
- 2016 – Homeland Security, For-Site Foundation, San Francisco
- 2016 – Spheres of Suspension, Charles B. Wang Center, New York, NY
- 2014 – Shiva Ahmadi: In Focus – Asia Society, New York City
- 2014 – Artist in Exile: Creativity, Activism, and the Diasporic Experience, Geoffrey Yeh Art Gallery, New York, NY
- 2013 – Apocalyptic Playland – Leila Heller Gallery, New York City
- 2012 – The Fertile Crescent, Rutgers University Museum Exhibition, Newark, NJ
- 2011 – Art X Detroit, Museum of Contemporary Art, Detroit, MI
- 2010 – Shiva Ahmadi: Reinventing the Poetics of Myth – Leila Heller Gallery, New York City
- 2008 – Ahmadi and Zhang: Looking Back, Feldman Gallery, Pacific Northwest College of Art, Portland, OR.
- 2005 – Oil Crisis, Leila Heller Gallery, New York, NY

== Awards ==
- 2016 – Anonymous Was A Woman Award
- 2009 – Kresge Artist Fellowship
- 2003 – First Prize, Michigan Fine Arts Competition
- 2001 – Thomas C. Rumble University Graduate Fellowship, Wayne State University

== See also ==
- List of Iranian women artists
