= Farid Novin =

Canadian economist

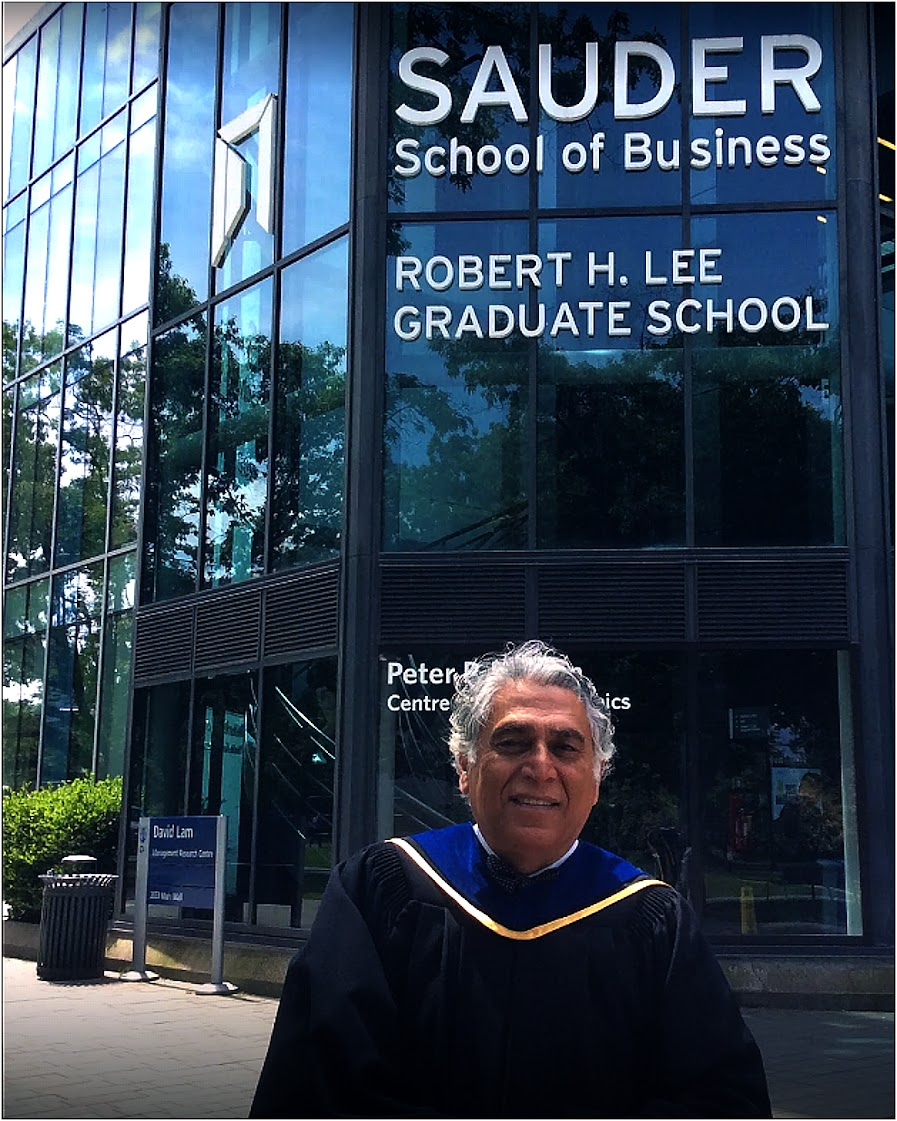

Senior Representative of Bank of Canada in British Columbia and Yukon, and Adjunct Professor of Finance at Sauder School of Business, University of British Columbia
- In office 1 February 1992 – 29 June 2014

Personal details
- Born: 1 May 1947 (age 79) Isfahan, Imperial State of Iran
- Spouse: Guity Novin
- Children: Sal Novin, Alamir Novin, Alishah Novin
- Education: National University of Iran (BA); Institute of Social Studies (Post Graduate Diploma - Socio-Economic Planning); Manchester University (MA); Queen's University (Ph.D.)

Farid Novin (Persian: فرید نوین; born 1 May 1947) is a Canadian economist. He served as Senior Representative of Bank of Canada in British Columbia and Yukon, from 1992 to 2014.

== Early life ==
Novin was born in 1947 in Isfahan, Iran. His father, Mohammad Hassan Novin, worked as a parliamentary adviser to several prime ministers, including Hoveyda, Amoozgar, Gen. Azhari, Sharif Emami, and Bakhtiar. His mother Soroor Panahandeh was an official in the Ministry of Health in Iran.

== Early education in Iran ==
Due to his father's various postings, Novin's education took place in multiple cities:

- Primary education: Semnan (Mhran Primary School) and Rasht (Farabi Primary School)
- Secondary education: Mashhad (Nader High School) and Tehran (Adib High School)
- Bachelor's degree: Economics, National University of Iran

== Professional career in Iran ==
After completing his bachelor's degree (1967), Novin served two years in the military as a second lieutenant in Iran's Military Industries Organization.

Following his military service, Novin joined the Plan and Budget Organization (Iran) as a budget analyst for higher education (1969). His responsibilities included:

- Negotiating and determining budgets for the Ministry of Higher Education
- Overseeing budgets for various universities and research institutions, including:

- Aryamehr University of Technology and its affiliated research entities
- Pahlavi University of Shiraz
- Mashhad University, Tabriz University, Isfahan University, and Rezaieh University (now Urmia University)
- Newly established Bu-Ali Sina University of Hamedan and Azad University

== Art reviews, literary research and play-write ==
During this time, Novin also contributed articles to several periodicals, including Nagin, Khoosheh, and Zaman magazines. His writings covered topics in research, literature, and cultural criticism. As a playwright, Farid Novin wrote the play “Axis of Coordinates”, published by Nemooneh Publications in 1971. He has published many other plays on his personal blog.

Novin was one of the first supporters of Cinemaye Azad or Free Cinema in Iran, that was created by a small group of students from Tehran's Dramatic Arts university in 1969. His monthly reports in Negin magazine for the first time seriously reviewed and introduced the young filmmakers of this cinema such as Hassan Bani Hashemi, Kianoush Ayari, Behnam Jafari, Shahryar Parsipour, Nasraleh Shibani, Farhad Pourazem, Ali Yeganeh, Mohammad Farhomand, and Amir Afshari to the readers.

== Further studies in Europe and Canada ==
In 1975, Novin left for Europe to continue his studies. His studies in Europe and Canada allowed him to obtain the following degrees:

1. Postgraduate Diploma in Socio-economic Planning, International Institute of Social Studies, The Hague, Netherlands (1976)
2. Advanced Diploma in Development Economics, Manchester University, England (1978)
3. Master's degree in economics, Manchester University (1979), specializing in Monetary economics and Development Economics
4. Ph.D. in economics, Queen's University in Kingston, Ontario, Canada (1983), specializing in Econometrics and Monetary Policy

His Ph.D. thesis, titled A Bayesian Choice Theoretic Approach to the Dynamic Adjustment of Prices: A Study of Price Behavior in Canadian Manufacturing Industries, was accepted by Queen's University, leading to the awarding of his Ph.D. in 1983.

== Career in Canada ==
He was Assistant Professor of Economics at Concordia University Montreal, and adjunct professor of finance at the Sauder School of Business at University of British Columbia. He has served in various departments of Bank of Canada as Energy specialist, Economic Projection, and Credit Analyst before taking a leading role in the Regional Office of Bank of Canada in BC and Yukon.

In this capacity, he directed research and analysis on economic and financial developments in the region. He also played a major role in communicating the Bank's messages to a variety of audiences and promoted an exchange of views on the economy and monetary policy.

Apart from his academic papers, he is the author of three research articles published in the Bank of Canada Review.

Dave Formosa, President of the Chamber of Commerce, recounted that he had invited Novin to Powell River following a meeting a year prior. At that earlier occasion, Novin had forecasted that Canada was at the forefront of recovering from the economic downturn—a prediction that, as Formosa noted, had indeed proven accurate. — Laura Waltz, Powell River Peak, 25 November 2009

== Personal life ==
Novin married Guity Novin, a painter and graphic designer. They have three sons Sal Novin, a US Health IT executive who died at 45 of brain cancer, Alamir Novin Ph.D. Assistant Professor, School of Information Science College of Information and Communications University of South Carolina, and Alishah Novin, a product manager at Microsoft, Community Leader of the Year - 12th Annual NTC Awards - NTC
