= Naz Shahrokh =

Iranian visual artist (b. 1969)

- Born: 1969 (age 56–57); Tehran, Pahlavi Iran
- Occupations: Visual artist, educator
- Known for: Painting, sculpture, installation art, video art, land art
- Movement: Conceptual art

Naz Shahrokh (Persian: ناز شاهرخ; born 1969) is an Iranian-born visual artist and educator whose multidisciplinary, conceptual practice spans miniature painting, sculptural assemblage, site-specific installation, land art, and video art. She lives and works in Abu Dhabi, and has previously lived in Paris, Los Angeles, Cairo, and Brooklyn.

== Early life and education ==
Shahrokh was born in 1969 in Tehran, Iran, the great-granddaughter of Iranian politician and elected Zoroastrian representative Keikhosrow Shahrokh. She has described a well-traveled childhood, moving from Iran to Paris at age four, to Los Angeles at eleven, and to Brooklyn, New York, at twenty. She speaks Persian, French, and English, and has spoken of growing up with a deep connection to her Zoroastrian faith and its traditions.

She earned a BFA in Painting (1993), an MFA in Painting (1997), and an MS in Art History (1997), all from Pratt Institute, Brooklyn.

== Teaching ==
Shahrokh taught fine art and art history at Pratt Institute from 1998 to 2008, and in the Performing and Visual Arts department at the American University in Cairo, Egypt, from 2004 to 2006. Since 2008, she has taught at the College of Arts and Creative Enterprises, Zayed University, Abu Dhabi.

== Style and influences ==
Shahrokh's work draws on Persian miniature painting, land art and earthworks, Minimalism and Conceptual art, and Navajo Sand Painting. Working primarily with detritus, both synthetic and organic, she transforms discarded materials into new forms, an approach she has linked to her Zoroastrian-rooted interest in harmony with the natural environment. She has described her practice as assembling visual narratives that are "gentle to the eye as well as revealing."

Her installation 22.1, comprising glass jars, folded linen shirts, and a silver spoon in a suitcase, has been described as engaging in artistic dialogue with the work of Ana Mendieta and Joseph Beuys.

== Notable works ==
In protest of a New York City decision to end glass recycling, Shahrokh created Stratosphere (2002–2004), a mountain-shaped installation built from collected bottles. In Abu Dhabi, Haft-Sin Zazen (2010), made of piles of salt on white cloth referencing the traditional Iranian New Year table setting, has been read as alluding to the region's reliance on desalination — a connection writer Sharon Parker has also linked to Shahrokh's earlier years in Egypt. Column Wall (2010) stacked six months of collected local newspapers from floor to ceiling, intended to represent the tree used to produce them.

== Selected exhibitions ==
- 2024: Be Fekret Hastam, XVA Gallery, Dubai, UAE
- 2023: Resonating Tides, Women's Pavilion, Expo City Dubai (COP28)
- 2022: United Arab Emirates: Living Landscape/Living Memory, Smithsonian Folklife Festival, Washington, D.C.
- 2020 and 2019: The Ocean Refuses No River and Wish Tree, XVA Gallery, Dubai
- 2004: 24th Annual Artist-in-the-Marketplace Exhibition, The Bronx Museum of the Arts, New York

== Awards and publications ==
Her honors include the Artist-in-the-Marketplace Fellowship, The Bronx Museum of the Arts (2004), and a Change Inc. (Robert Rauschenberg Foundation) grant (2003). She authored the chapter "Land Art in the United Arab Emirates," in Return to the Source: New Energy Landscapes from the Land Art Generator Initiative Abu Dhabi, edited by Elizabeth Monoian and Robert Ferry (Prestel, 2020), pp. 22–26, ISBN 978-3-7913-5938-0.

== See also ==
List of Iranian women artists
