= Fatemeh Emdadian =

Iranian sculptor (born 1955)

- فاطمه امدادیان
- Born: 1955 (age 70–71); Tabriz, Iran
- Education: Behzad School of Fine Arts, Tehran
- Known for: Sculpture
- Spouse: Nosratollah Moslemian

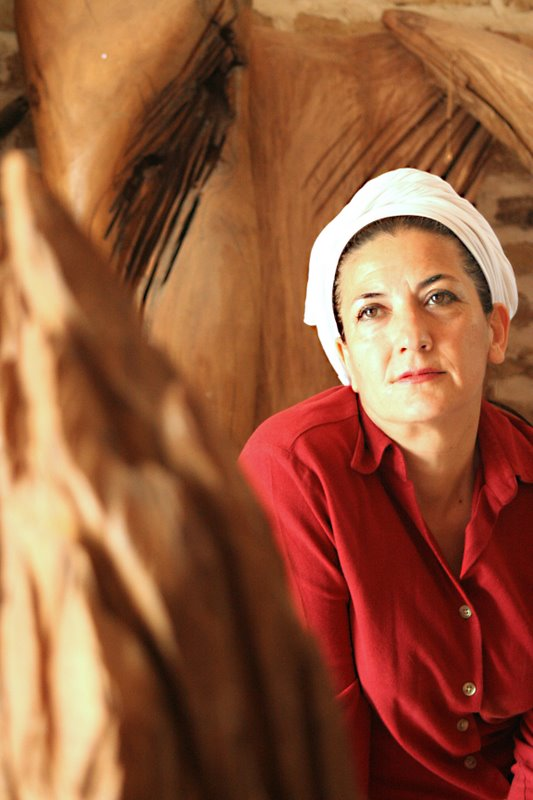

Fatemeh Emdadian (Persian: فاطمه امدادیان; born in 1955 in Tabriz) is a contemporary Iranian sculptor based in Mehrshahr, Karaj, Iran. She often creates sculptures using wood, bronze, and various casting materials.

== Biography ==
In 1976, she graduated from the Behzad School of Fine Arts in Tehran with a B.A. in sculpture.

Emdadian is married to Iranian painter, Nosratollah Moslemian and together they have two daughters.

In 2002, she was awarded 4th place in the Tehran Sculpture Biennial's juried award, held at the Niavaran Cultural Center. Her work featured in this exhibition included wooden sculptures shaped similarly to an angel's wing, arranged in groupings.

In 2009, she participated in The Masques of Shahrazad exhibition alongside 28 Iranian women artists, surveying three decades at Candlestar Gallery in London. Her artwork, along with that of other artists, was part of the Disappeared Statues in Tehran, 2010.

== See also ==
- Culture of Iran
- Islamic art
- Iranian art
- List of Iranian artists
