= Amineh Kazemzadeh =

Iranian painter (born 1963)

Amineh Kazemzadeh (born in 1963) is an Iranian painter.

== Biography ==
Amineh Kazemzadeh was born in 1963, in Tehran, Iran. She studied and trained as a painter in Tehran University's art classes in the 1990s but soon shifted towards sculptures, working with a variety of materials such as stone, wood, bronze, fiber and textile, and techniques commonly regarded as feminine practices, like weaving, sewing and knitting. Her works mainly represent her concerns with cultural issues and challenges in her homeland, Iran, with regards to its heritage and traditions, modernization, and gender policies. Her works were included and displayed in more than 30 group exhibitions and two solo exhibitions in Iran and Greece in art galleries such as Saba Art Gallery, Iran Artists Organizations, Imam Ali Museum, Textile Arts Factory as well as Shirin. She has received several national and international awards and is currently a member of the Iranian Sculptors' Association.

== See also ==
- List of Iranian women artists
