= Shahla Arbabi =

Iranian-born American artist

- Born: 1945 (age 80–81); Shiraz, Iran
- Education: University of Tehran College of Fine Arts; Accademia di Belle Arti di Roma; American University

Shahla Arbabi (born 1945) is an Iranian-born American artist and educator. She resides in Washington DC.

== Biography ==
Arbabi was born in 1945 in Shiraz, Iran. She began painting in childhood.

From 1961 until 1965 she studied at Tehran's School of Fine Arts of the Ministry of Higher Education; Iran before spending four years at the Accademia di Belle Arti di Roma. She taught art at the University of Tehran in the late 1960s to 1974 when she moved to the United States where she gained her MFA degree in painting in 1978 and printmaking in 1982 from the American University.

Arbabi's work is in various public museum collections including the National Museum of Asian Art formerly Arthur M. Sackler Gallery, the University of Maryland Art Gallery, among others. Her 1996 mixed-media work, Untitled #2 is owned by the United States Mission to the United Nations, the United States' delegation to the United Nations. During her career she has shown her work at many solo and group exhibitions internationally, both in Europe and the United States.

== See also ==
- List of Iranian women artists
