= Niloofar Ziae =

Iranian-born painter and arts educator (born 1962)

- نیلوفر ضیایی
- Born: 1962 (age 63–64)
- Education: Alzahra University, Utah State University
- Occupations: Painter, arts educator
- Website: Official website

Niloofar Ziae (b. 1962; Persian: نیلوفر ضیایی) is an Iranian-born American painter and arts educator.

== Biography ==
While she was studying, in the 1980s, Ziae's home became an underground safe haven for artists and creators to work in post-revolutionary Iran. After completing her studies at Alzahra University in Visual Arts in 1989, Ziae worked as an assistant in painter Aydin Aghdashloo's studio.

In 1991, she had her debut at the Hosseini Gallery, in Teheran, Iran.

In 1993, she began teaching as an art instructor at the Academy of Arts and Literature for Children in Tehran. Simultaneously, she continued her work in Aghdashloo's studio, held two more solo shows.

In 1998, she moved to the United States to attend graduate school at Utah State University. In 2002, Ziae graduated with a Master of Fine Arts degree and was hired by the Nora Eccles Harrison Museum of Art as the Gallery Coordinator. She has also worked as an adjunct professor teaching art and design, crediting her years of working under censorship in Tehran with her ability to teach students to express themselves.

Her early works explored inner emotional turmoil communicated through abstract expressionism but she has developed her style into an exploration of landscape and architectural elements dynamically depicting the environmental changes growing cities undergo. She connects the architectural styles of Iran with the American cities in which she has lived.

She has held showings of her work throughout the western United States (2000–2006), in Vancouver, Canada, Tehran (2006–2009) and most recently in the Boston-area, including a presentation at Harvard University's Islamic Studies program (2012–2014).
