= Bijan Jenab =

Iranian professor of art

Bijan Jenab بیژن جناب
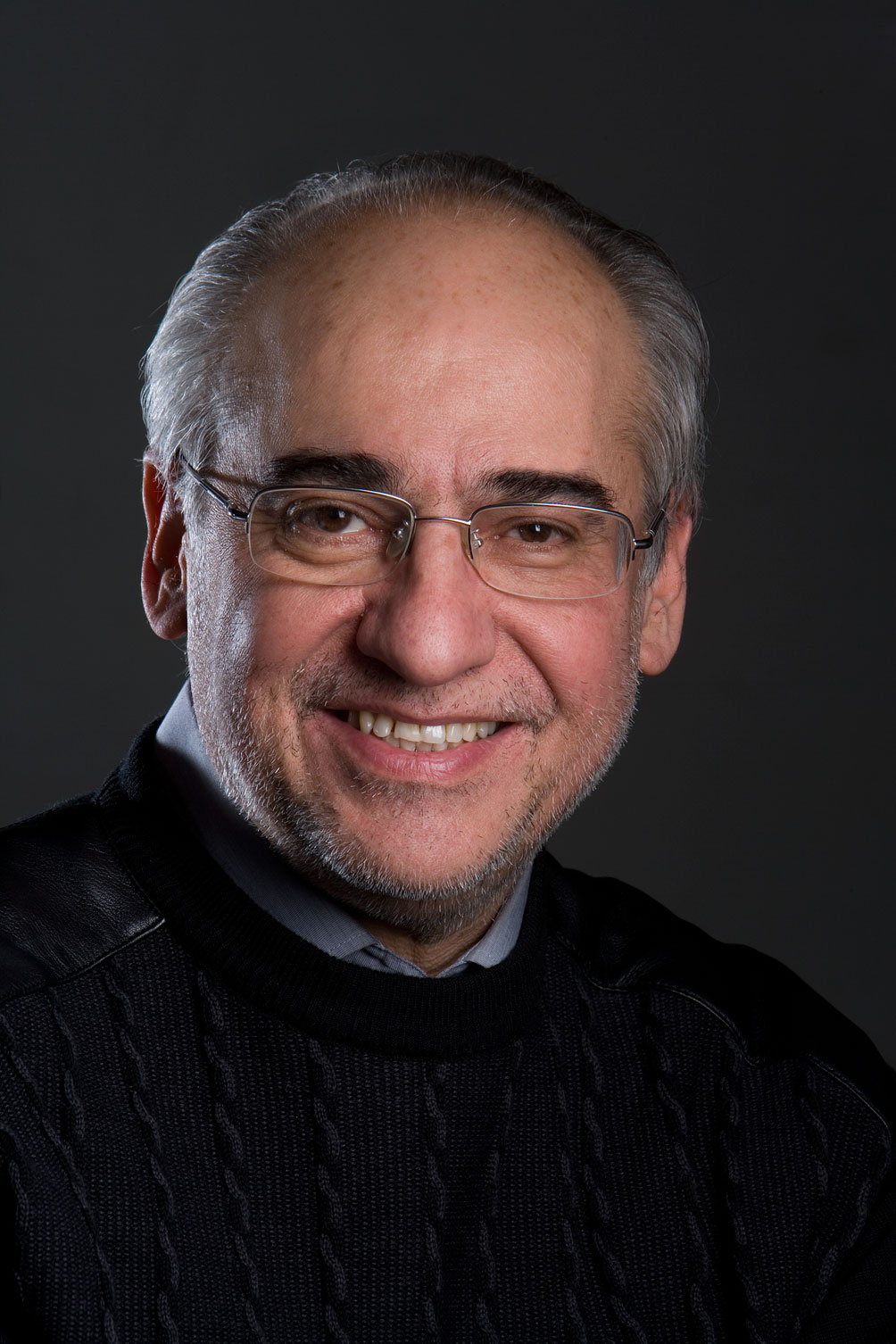
- Bijan Jenab
- Born: January 2, 1952 (age 74); Tehran, Iran
- Education: Faculty of Fine Arts in University of Tehran, 1977. Iowa State University, 1982.
- Known for: Graphic design

Bijan Jenab (Persian: بیژن جناب, born January 2, 1952, in Tehran, Iran) is an Iranian graphic designer and professor at the School of Fine Arts at Tehran University, Al Zahra University and at Islamic Free University Radio/Television. He is one of the founding members of Iranian Graphic Design Society and currently serves as a jury member.

== Education ==
Bijan is a graduate of Tehran University and holds a master's degree from Iowa State University on a full scholarship from Alavi Foundation.

== Awards and notable work ==
Jenab was awarded the Golden Plate from the Tehran International Poster Biennial and is the winner of Design and Production Management in the International Design and Production Exhibition in Tehran in 2000. He has received letters of appreciation from UNICEF for poster design in 1991; for the logo design of the Iranian Society of Gynecologic Oncology in 2004; and from Iowa State University for the best senior project on the Tehran Film Festival in 1980. He has been a regular art contributor at Iran Film Festival with his art. Jenab has been the book designer for some of the famous and leading book publications from Iran including Tehran Past & Present, Aydin Aghdashloo, Contemporary Pottery of Iran, The First Tehran International Contemporary Drawing Exhibition, and From California To Abyaneh.

== Compilations ==
- Packaging Design ISBN 978-622-7564-28-0 Fatemi Pub. 2021

== Books ==
1. Ahmad Vosough Ahmadi Selected Painting ISBN 964-5520-72-X Negar Books
2. Isfahan pearl of Iran ISBN 964-306-397-6 Yassavoli Publications
3. Hojjat Shakiba Selected Painting ISBN 978-600-5091-66-3 Negar Books
4. Mahmoud Farshchian Selected Painting ISBN 978-600-5091-20-5 Negar Books
5. Mohammad Reza Atashzad ISBN 964-5520-35-5 Negar Books
6. Shirin Ettehadieh Selected Painting 1980-2007 ISBN 978-964-7729-74-1 Mahriz Publish
7. Ali Akbar Sadeghi Selected Works1977-97 ISBN 964-91403-1-X Iranian- Art Publishing
8. Parviz Tanavoli Sculptor Writer & Collector ISBN 964-91403-4-4 Iranian Art Publishing
9. Abbas Kiarostami Photo Collection ISBN 964-91403-6-0 Iranian Art Publishing
10. Four Views Images Of Iran ISBN 964-91403-7-9 Iranian Art Publishing
11. Parvaneh Etemadi Selected Works 2960-98 ISBN 964-91403-2-8 Iranian Art Publishing
12. Silver Cyprus 2013. Aban Book Publication. 2000. ISBN 978-600-6413-76-1.
13. Hamid Reza, Norouzi Talab. Tehran Past & Present (Az Tehran ta Tehran). Yassavoli; 2nd edition (2010). p. 203. ISBN 978-964-306-396-2.
14. Aydin, Aghdashloo (2012). The Negaristan Collection. Iran: Negar Books. p. 26. ISBN 978-600-5091-36-6.
15. Daii, Nader (2004). From California To Abyaneh. Yassavoli. p. 120. ISBN 964-306-261-9.
16. Iran of Iranian (2016). ISBN 978-600-04-5663-4 Photography book
17. Cover Design Strategy Builder: How to make and communicate more effective strategies, 2015 ISBN 978-964-317-920-5 Rasa Books
18. NEGAR- E- JAVIDAN (2017) The Life and Works of Master Mahmoud Farshchian, Forwarded and Prologue by: Mahmoud Farshchian and Seyyed Hossein Nasr ISBN 978-600-400-017-8 Farhangsara Mirdashti
19. Aran & Bidgol (2017) ISBN 978-964-6111-22-6 Maranjab Publishing
20. Shirin Ettehadieh Drawings on paper 1980 - 2020 ISBN 978-964-321-532-3 Farzan Rooz Publish
21. The Ancient House ISBN 964-06-0853-X
22. Engraving As Narrated by Mahmood Dehnavi ISBN 964-91227-9-6
23. Tehran Past & present ISBN 978-964-306-400-6, 978-964-306-399-3
24. Shirin Ettehadieh, Drawings On Paper 1980-2020 ISBN 978-964-321-532-3

== Book cover designs ==
1. The glory of Persian Watercolor ISBN 964-5520-96-7
2. Nicool Faridani Iran ISBN 964-306-236-8
3. Memories & Glances, Yassavoli Publications ISBN 964-306-182-5
4. Life and Thought of Zoroaster, collected Articles the life and doctrine of Zoroaster ISBN 964-7858-46-9
5. Tender As Rain, Fereidoun Moshiri ISBN 964-5983-92-4
6. Karname-Ye Zarrin, A Memorial on Dr. Abdol Hossain Zarrinkoob
7. Selected Paintings Of Hojjat Shakiba ISBN 978-600-5091-66-3
8. Gifts From The Other World, Collected Articles on Life works of Jalal-AD-Din-Rumi ISBN 964-372-022-5
9. On The Shore Of The Island Of Bewilderment, Collected Articles On Life and Works Of Simin Daneshvar ISBN 964-372-066-7
10. A memorial on Seyed Abolghassem Enjavi Shirazi ISBN 964-372-008-X
11. A Memorial On Kamal-Ol Molk ISBN 964-6995-04-7
12. May-O Mina (Wine and Wineglass) Collected Articles On Life and Works Of Omarkhayyam ISBN 964-94981-5-X

== Magazines ==
- Tavoos Quarterly Magazine ISSN 1562-3068
  - No. 1 (Autumn 1999)
  - No. 2 (Winter 2000)
  - No. 3 & 4 (Spring & Summer 2000)
  - No. 5 & 6 (Autumn & Winter 2001)
