= Taravat Talepasand =

American artist (born 1979)

- Born: 1979 (age 46–47); Eugene, Oregon, U.S.
- Education: Rhode Island School of Design (BFA); San Francisco Art Institute (MFA)
- Occupations: Visual artist, educator, activist
- Known for: Painting, drawing, sculpture, installation art
- Website: Official website

Taravat Talepasand (born 1979) is an Iranian-American visual artist, activist, and educator. She is known for her interdisciplinary painting practice including drawing, sculpture and installation. As an Iranian-American woman, Talepasand explores the cultural taboos that reflect on gender and political authority. Her approach to representation and figuration reflects the cross-pollination, or lack thereof, in our Western Society. Talepasand previously held the title of the chair of the painting department at San Francisco Art Institute (SFAI). She is an assistant professor in art practice at Portland State University.

== Early life and education ==
Taravat Talepasand was born in 1979, in Eugene, Oregon. Her father Iraj was studying at University of Oregon at the time. She was raised in Portland, Oregon.

She studied Persian miniature painting in Isfahan. Talepasand received her B.F.A. degree from the Rhode Island School of Design (RISD) in 2001, and received a M.F.A. degree at the San Francisco Art Institute (SFAI) in 2006.

== Career ==
Talepasand has taught in the Painting Department at SFAI and at California College of the Arts (CCA). She previously was the chair of the painting department at San Francisco Art Institute (SFAI), until 2019.

In the 2014 exhibition, Theory of Survival: Fabrications curated by Taraneh Hemami at Southern Exposure gallery brought together twelve San Francisco Bay Area Iranian-American artists to display work in their own booth, similar to a traditional bazaar. The space allowed for a gathering place for Iranian American artists and allowed for more community dialog. Talepasand's own booth featured souvenir-type items for sale such as t-shirts, magnets and CDs, highlighting the relationship between consumer culture and the arts but also addressing Orientalism. Artists participating in the exhibition included; Hushidar Mortezaie, Morehshin Allahyari, Haleh Niazmand, Ala Ebtekar, Sanaz Mazinani, Ali Dadgar and Gelare Khoshgozaran.

In the 2019 multi-disciplinary group exhibition, Once at Present: Contemporary Art of Bay Area Iranian Diaspora curated by Kevin B. Chen and Taraneh Hemami, at Minnesota Street Project in San Francisco featured Talepasand's work.

Talepasand work has been featured in Art in America, The Huffington Post, New American Paintings, Art Papers, The Boston Globe, SOMA Magazine, and many more. She has exhibited her work in United States, Europe, and the Middle East. Talepasand was one of forty artists selected by the Orange County Museum of Art for the 2010 California Biennial. She is one of the people featured in the film, Immigrant Stories: Iranian-Americans of Silicon Valley (2021) by Nima Naimi, Alireza Sanayei, and Julian Gigola.

Her works have been added to the permanent museum collections at the Fine Arts Museums of San Francisco (FAMSF) at the De Young Museum, Portland Museum of Art, and the Orange County Museum of Art.

== See also ==
- List of Iranian artists
- List of Iranian women artists
