= Maryam Salour =

Iranian visual artist (born 1954)

- Born: Maryam Salour; 24 September 1954 (age 71); Tehran, Iran
- Education: Academie de Sevigny, Paris
- Known for: Sculpture, Ceramic and Painting
- Website: www.maryamsalour.com

Maryam Salour (born 24 September 1954 in Tehran) is an Iranian sculptor, ceramist and painter. She lives in Tehran, and previously lived in Paris.

== Early life and education ==
After receiving a high school diploma in Tehran, Iran, Salour moved to London to study computer science in 1974–75. She continued her computer education in École Superieure des Informatiques. Paris, France, and graduated in 1980. During the period of 1984–80 she worked at Khayat Publishing in Paris as a calligrapher, line art designer, and workshop supervisor. In 1986, she attended the course of Ceramic Studies at the Academy of Savigny in Paris.

In 1987, Salour moved to Tehran and started her own workshop, practicing ceramics, sculpture, and painting.

== Career ==
Mayam Salour holds extensive knowledge and understanding of Iran's contemporary art. She has prepared eight programs for the BBC World Service, including two programs on young blind Iranian painters. She also conducts summer ceramic classes for children and young people.

She has held more than 23 solo exhibitions in Iran, the United States, Switzerland, and the United Kingdom, and more took part in more than 24 group exhibitions in Iran, the UAE, Germany, France, the US, and Venezuela. Salour was the director of the 8th Iranian National Biennial of Ceramic Arts in Tehran.

== See also ==
- List of Iranian women artists
