= Mansooreh Hosseini =

Iranian contemporary artist 1926–2012

- منصوره حسینی
- Born: 1 September 1926; Tehran, Imperial State of Iran
- Died: 13 June 2012 (aged 85–86); Tehran, Iran
- Known for: Painting
- Movement: Contemporary Art

Mansooreh Hosseini (Persian: منصوره حسینی; born 1 September 1926 – 13 June 2012) was an Iranian contemporary artist.

== Life ==
At a young age, it was discovered that she had a talent for drawing, which compelled her father to hire a painting tutor to help her work to her potential. Later on, she was educated at the University of Tehran in the Faculty of Fine Arts, from which she graduated in 1949.

Mansooreh left Iran in the early 1950s to live in Italy, where she furthered her education at the Rome Academy of Fine Arts leading up to her artistic début at the 28th (XXVIII) Venice Biennial in 1956.

After a moderately successful period in Italy, Mansooreh returned to Iran in 1959 and won several awards in the Tehran Painting Biennial. In 2004, she exhibited at the Tehran Museum of Contemporary Art.

== Styles ==
Mansooreh is known for having produced works in both figurative and abstract styles. Her works have often included elements of Kufic script. She is known, along with Behjat Sadr, to use traditional elements of both the Persian culture and that of contemporary Europeans. She is considered to be an experimentalist. She is a Permanent Member of Islamic Republic of Iran's Academy of Arts.

== Writer ==
Mansooreh also wrote many art reviews in various Iranian media. In her critiques she was unbiased, informative, and analytic. For example, in her article Why exhibitions have no viewers? (reviewing Guity Novin's exhibition Expression of Silence), published in Kayhan in November, 1971, she observed that Iranian intelligentsia ignored important exhibitions such as the recently held exhibition of Henry Moore in the National Museum of Iran. She wrote:

A friend who was just back from Europe was asking me "what’s the matter? Is it possible to see the original works by Henry Moore? This is the event of the century. We have to plan in advance for visiting such an exhibition, we have to be checked by electronic cameras, and security gourds that protect such treasures, etc." and yet when I asked an icon of the Iranian modern poetry in the theatre of museum that "have you visited Henry Moore’s sculptures?" He replied "those torsos? ..yeh, but I thought they are your works?"

Then she moved to her critique of Novin’s work:"Expression of Silence, was a poetic designation for Guity’s exhibition in the Negar Galley." She concluded the article with her verdict:

There was a consistency in her selection of subjects -- a testament to perspicacious and enlightened character of the artist. The choice of colours, selection of gradation of hue, which explicitly used more-or-less the same tonality in all the works, revealed the story of artist’s unfaltering and inquisitive mind.

== Death ==
Mansooreh Hosseini's body was found in her home by neighbours on 28 June 2012, 15 days after her death. She was 86 years old. Earlier in 2012, she had been moved to hospital due to her heart disease and age.

== See also ==
- Behjat Sadr
- Guity Navran-Novin
- Women in Iran
