= Parisa Damandan =

Iranian photographer and art historian

Parisa Damandan, or Parīsā Damandān Nafīsī (born 1967, Isfahan, Iran) is an Iranian photographer and art historian.

== Early life and education ==
She received a degree in photography from the University of Tehran. She is the author of Portrait photographs from Isfahan: Faces in transition, 1920-1950, a book illustrating the history of Isfahan in the early 20th century with portrait photographs, which she collected over a period of ten years; the photographs were hard to find because many photo archives in Isfahan had been burned after the enactment of a 1979 law forbidding depictions of unveiled women.

After the 2003 Bam earthquake, Damandan started a project to recover and protect the city's photographic archives. As of 2006, she had recovered over ten thousand negatives, and the project was not yet complete.
