= Soheila Sokhanvari =

Iranian-born British painter (born 1964)

- سهیلا سخنوری
- Born: 1964 (age 61–62); Shiraz, Pahlavi Iran
- Education: University of Cambridge, Anglia Ruskin University, Chelsea College of Art and Design, Goldsmiths' College
- Occupation: Multidisciplinary visual artist
- Known for: Painting, drawing, installation art
- Movement: Magic realism
- Website: Official website

Soheila Sokhanvari (Persian: سهیلا سخنوری; born 1964) is an Iranian-born British multidisciplinary visual artist. She is known for her drawings and egg-tempera paintings, often featuring her memories, or based on family photographs. Sokhanvari now lives in Cambridge, where she is an associate artist at the Wysing Arts Centre, a contemporary arts residency centre.

== Biography ==
Soheila Sokhanvari was born in 1964 in Shiraz, Pahlavi Iran. She left Iran in 1978 at the age of 14 before the Iranian Revolution, to study in the United Kingdom. After she moved away from her family and her homeland, she found greater importance in her family photos. She is a dual national with citizenship in Iran and in the UK.

She graduated with a degree (1986) in biochemistry from University of Cambridge. Sokhanvari also has a degree (2005) in fine art and art history from Anglia Ruskin University in East Anglia, United Kingdom; a postgraduate diploma from Chelsea College of Art and Design (now Chelsea College of Arts) in London; and she has a MFA degree from Goldsmiths' College.

Sokhanvari's early work featured crude oil, and eventually expanded to sepia drawings of family and pre-Iranian Revolution. Her more recent artwork is made with brightly colored egg tempera on vellum (calf skin) and she uses a squirrel hair brush (which are reminiscent of the materials used in Persian miniatures). She uses old family photographs as subjects for her paintings, and she heavily utilizes patterns. She has also painted the feminist entertainers and icons of Iran as a subject.

Sokhanvari's solo exhibitions include "Rebel Rebel" (2022–2023) at Curve Gallery, Barbican Centre in London; and "We Could Be Heroes..." (2023–2024) at Heong Gallery in Downing College, Cambridge. Her artwork can be found in museum collections including at the Los Angeles County Museum of Art, and National Gallery of Victoria.

== See also ==
- List of Iranian women artists
