= Maryam Eisler =

Iranian-born artist

Maryam Eisler (née Homayoun) is an Iranian-born, London-based artist and former marketer. She is known as a photographer, writer, book editor, art collector, and she serves on many boards.

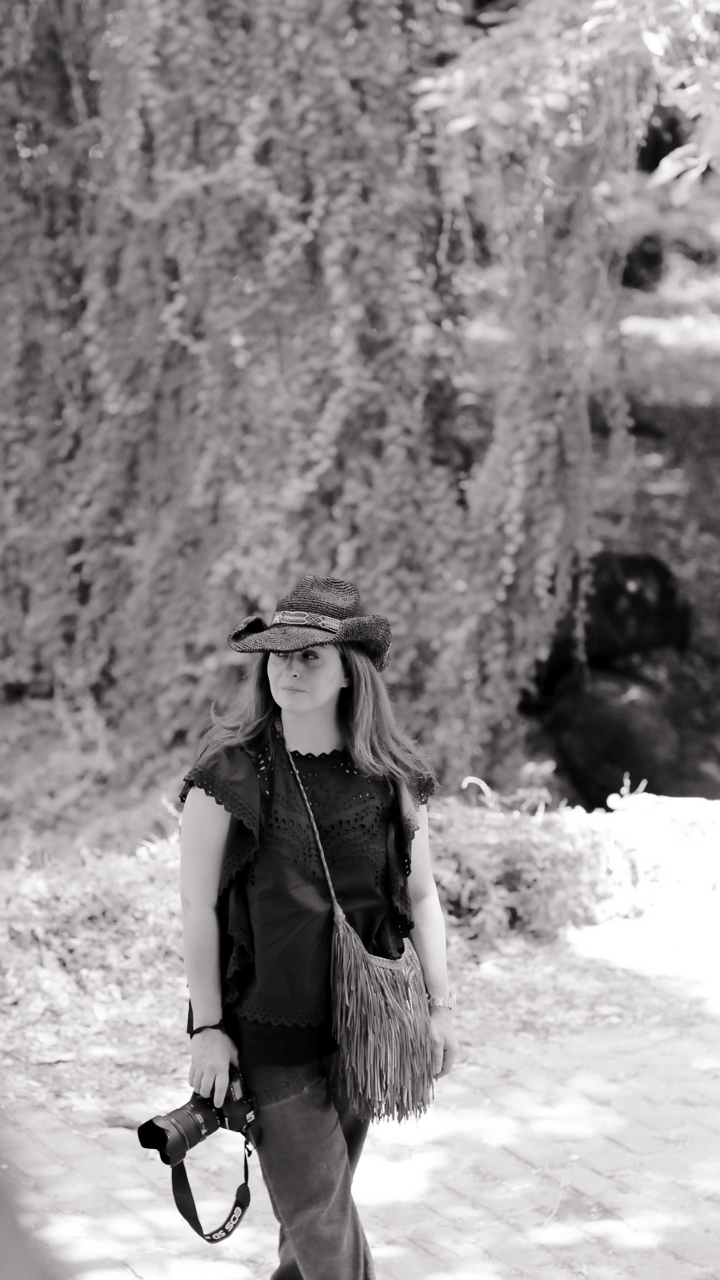
Eisler in 2015

== Early life and education ==
Born in Tehran, Iran in 1968, Eisler emigrated to Paris, France at age 10.

Eisler holds a BA degree in Political Science from Wellesley College (1989) and an MBA degree from Columbia University (1993).

She has worked in consumer marketing at L'Oreal (1993–1998) followed by Estee Lauder (1998– 2001) in both London and New York City.

== Career ==
Eisler's first series, in 2016, was Searching for Eve in the American West. Her second major series, in 2017, was Eurydice in Provence.

"Divine Feminine" from Eurydice in Provence by Eisler (2016)

Eisler is a regular writer and contributor to Harpers Bazaar and has also contributed articles to Vanity Fair UK, Art and Auction magazine, and Canvas Magazine.

She has edited six books on art published by Thames & Hudson.

In 2014, Eisler was voted by Artnet as one of the "100 Most Powerful Women in Art" for her art collection, and one of "The Most Influential Women in the European art world".

In 2019, her exhibition Imagining Tina: A Dialogue With Edward Weston was held at the Tristan Hoare gallery, London.

== Boards ==
Eisler is a trustee of the Whitechapel Gallery, London, co-chair of Tate's MENAAC (Middle East North African Acquisitions Committee), and is a member of Tate's International Council. Eisler is also a founding member of the British Museum's CaMMEA committee (Contemporary and Modern Middle East Acquisitions), and sits on the Strategic Advisory Panel for the Delfina Foundation and Columbia University Global Centers. Eisler sits on the advisory board for Photo London art fair, and is a nominator for the Prix Pictet Photography Prize, as well as an Ambassador for Unseen Fair in Amsterdam. She also served on Wellesley College's board between 2012 and 2015.

== Publications ==
=== Publication by Eisler ===
- Voices: East London. London: Thames & Hudson; TransGlobe, 2017. ISBN 978-0500970850. With contributions by Gilbert & George and Jonny Woo.

=== Publications edited by Eisler ===
- Unleashed: Contemporary Art from Turkey (2010). London: Thames & Hudson; TransGlobe. ISBN 9780500977026
- Art & Patronage: The Middle East (2010). London: Thames & Hudson. ISBN 9780500977040
- Sanctuary: Britain's Artists and their Studios (2012). London: Thames & Hudson; TransGlobe. ISBN 9780500977071
- Art Studio America: Contemporary Artist’s Spaces (2013). London: Thames & Hudson; TransGlobe. ISBN 9780500970539
- London Burning: Portraits from a Creative City (2015). London: Thames & Hudson; TransGlobe. ISBN 9780500970713
