= Disappeared statues in Tehran, 2010 =

Removal of statues in Tehran, Iran

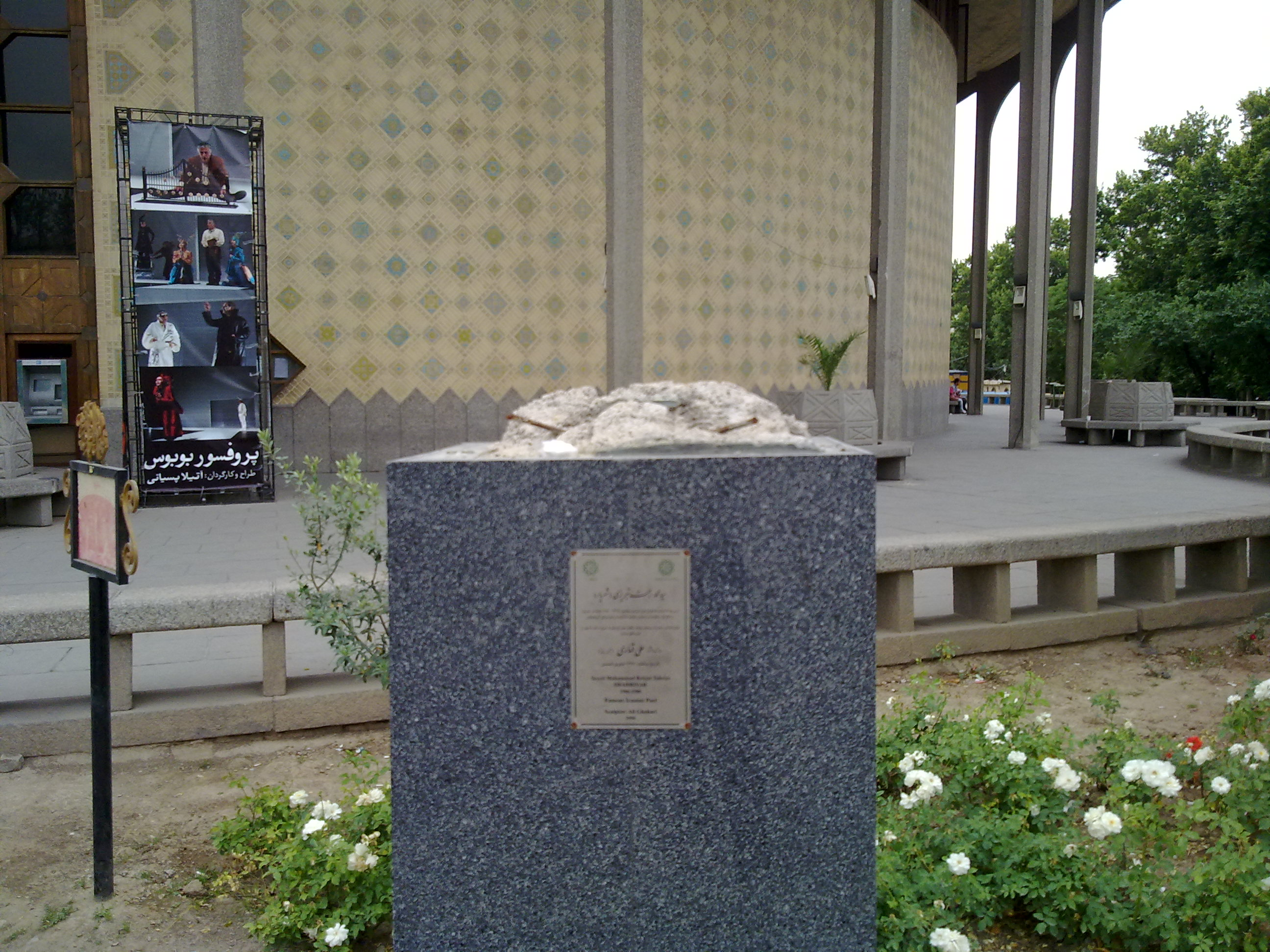
Ta'atr-e Shahr – Shahriar Statue

Disappeared statues in Tehran refers to a series of robberies committed during the months of April and May 2010 in Tehran, Iran, when twelve bronze statues of national heroes disappeared from public places for unknown reasons. Tehran officials treated the incidents as theft, while others have suggested that it may have been a deliberate removal by the government or religious groups. In June 2010, Tehran municipality officials asked the sculptors to remanufacture the sculptures.

Mohammad Bagher Ghalibaf, who at the time was the mayor of Tehran, stated in an announcement that Iranian police were pursuing the issue.

== List of missing statues ==
	Name	Stead	Sculptor
1	Sattar Khan	Satar Khan Street	Shahriar Zarabi
2	Bagher Khan	Shahr-e Ara Street	Shahriar Zarabi
3	Sanei-e Kh'atam	Mellat Park	Hamid Shans
4–5	Zendagi (Life), Unknown	Two Statues	Mohamad Madadi – Fateme Emdadian
6	Shahriar	Across to Ta'atr-e Shahr (Daneshjoo Park)	Ali Ghah'ari
7–8	Shariati	Shariati Park	Hamid Shans
9	M'adar va Farzand (Mother and Child)	Shahrak-e Gharb	Hojabr Ebrahimi
10	Avicenna	Behjat Abad Park	Uzra Abdul-Nabi
11	Calf	University of Tehran	
12	Esteghl'al Park's Bronze Sculpture	Esteghl'al Park	Ruhullah Shamsi-Zada
