= Hossein Khan Motamed =

Surgeon

- Born: February 26, 1893; Tehran, Iran
- Died: September 25, 1955 (aged 62); Garden City, New York
- Education: Tehran University of Medical Sciences; University of Tehran; Université de Paris
- Years active: 1915–1955
- Known for: Founder of First University Hospital in Iran
- Medical career
- Profession: Surgeon
- Institutions: Motamed Hospital, Sina Hospital, Pahlavi Hospital, Razi City Hospital
- Sub-specialties: laparotomy cholecystectomy thoracic surgery hernia
- Awards: First and Second place Scientific Medal of Iran

Hossein Khan Motamed, M.D. (also known as Doctor Hossein Khan Motamed) (1893–1955) was an Iranian surgeon and founder of Motamed Hospital in Tehran, Iran. Decorated with first (1925) and second place (1917) for the Scientific Medal of Iran.

== Biography ==
=== Early life ===
Hossein Motamed was born February 26, 1893, in Tehran Iran. He was the son of Abdol Karim Motamed (Motamed ol Hokama) and Kokab GolSorkhi. He graduated from the Medical School of Tehran, Tehran University in 1915 later to be known as Tehran University of Medical Sciences, and also studied and completed his Residency (medicine) abroad in Paris Université de Paris and Paris hospitals in France. He married Azizol Molouk Maham in 1922. His children; Fereydoun Motamed, Fahimeh Motamed Thomas, M.D., and Manuchehr Motamed, M.D.

=== Work ===
Hossein Khan Motamed began his career as an assistant surgeon in City Hospital of Tehran, 1915–1917. In a short time he became the chief of surgery section 1919–1920. He then became the chief of surgical section in Sina Hospital (also known as Sepah)1920–1922 and later chief of surgical section of Military Pahlavi Hospital with a rank of Colonel 1922–1936.

Dr. Motamed founded his own hospital, Motamed Hospital. Motamed Hospital was the only School of Medicine (Madreseh-ye Tebb) at that time after division of medicine had separated from Dar ul-Funun in earlier years. Motamed became the director and chief surgeon of his hospital in the years 1936–1940. Dr. Motamed was the first Iranian professor of surgery, he had his surgical training at Sina Hospital under the supervision of Dr. Ilberg from Germany. Dr. Ilberg was the chief of the Sina Hospital's surgical ward before World War I. After Dr. Ilberg departed Iran at the onset of World War I, Dr. Motamed took over his position. Many of the pioneer surgeons in the country including Dr. Sadegh Ghazi and Dr. Anwar Shakki received their surgical training from Dr. Motamed. Dr. Motamed is the first Iranian surgeon who conducted a gastrectomy and lumbar sympathectomy in Iran. He held surgical procedures classes in Motamed hospital, prior to which no educational hospital existed in Iran. He taught subjects such as pathology, histology, and embryology. His hospital had five free beds for the poor. He also became the director of surgical clinic of Razi City Hospital in Tehran 1940–1944.

Motamed was a professor and Adviser of Faculty at Medical University of Tehran of surgical theory and author of text in operative surgery 1939, and study in Hernia 1943. He was also Reza Shah Pahlavi, the Shah of Iran's personal physician.

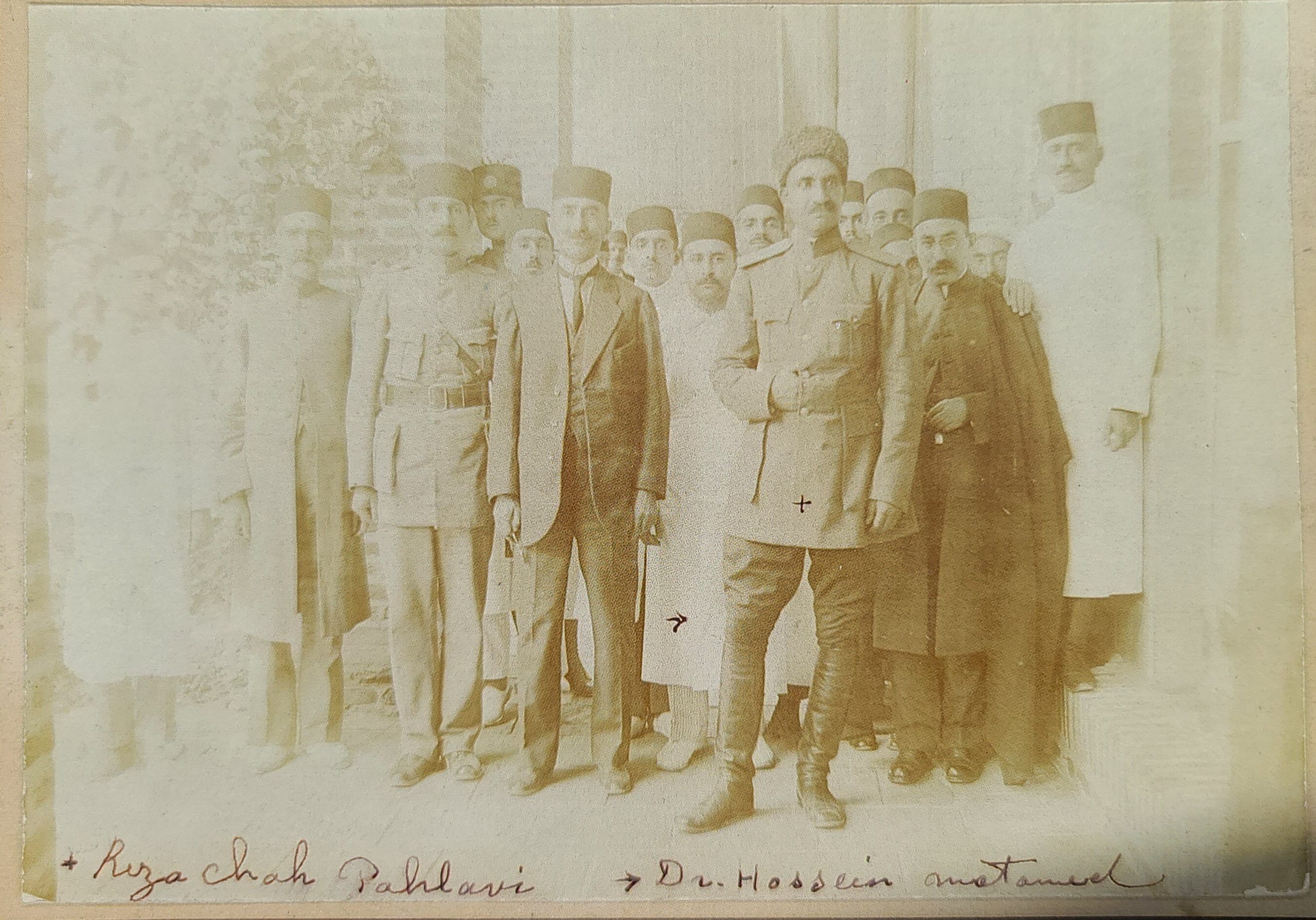
Hossein Khan Motamed standing in white robe behind Reza Shah (behind his right shoulder -Circa early 1920s)

Dr. Motamed immigrated to United States in 1944 toward the end of World War II and became a United States citizen in 1954. He was a resident of Garden City, New York where he also held a practice.

== Awards and honoraria ==
- Scientific Medal of Iran, First (1925) and Second place (1917)

== Publications ==
- Operative Surgery 1939
- Study in Hernia 1943

== Offices held ==
- Assistance surgeon, City Hospital of Tehran, Iran 1915–17.
- Chief of surgery section, City Hospital of Tehran, Iran 1919–1920.
- Chief of surgical section, Sina/Sepah Hospital, Tehran, Iran 1920–1922.
- Chief of surgical section, Military Pahlavi Hospital, Tehran, Iran 1922–1936.
- Founder of Motamed Hospital, Tehran, Iran 1936.
- Director and chief surgeon, Motamed Hospital, Tehran, Iran 1936–1940.
- Director of surgical clinic, Razi city hospital, Tehran, Iran 1940–1944.
- Medical Practice, Garden City, New York, 1944–1955.

== Education ==
- 1915 Medical Doctorate (M.D.), degree from Medical School of Tehran (also known as Dar ul-Funun).
- 1917 Medical Residency, Université de Paris
