= Sara Shamsavari =

British-Iranian artist, photographer, designer and educator

- Born: Tehran, Iran
- Education: Camberwell College of Arts (BA); University of Westminster (CertHE); Central Saint Martins (MA)

Sara Shamsavari is a British-Iranian interdisciplinary artist, photographer, designer and educator based in London.

== Early life and education ==
Shamsavari was born in Tehran, Iran to Iranian parents, the year of the Islamic Revolution. At 16 months old, Shamsavari developed Wilms' tumor, a tumor of the kidneys. This, along with the impending persecution for their faith the family faced after the revolution, prompted the family to escape Iran.

After seeking refuge in Brazil, for three months the family were granted asylum in Britain. Here Shamsavari was successfully cured of cancer at Great Ormond Street Hospital, an experience which later affected her work: "I hope to inspire people towards the message of love, equality and acceptance in this troubled world we live in."

Shamsavari attended Richmond upon Thames College, where she was able to narrow her focus down to art. She went on to study at Camberwell School of Art and Design. During her time there, she experimented with painting, drawing, mixed media and photography and film. She graduated in 2002 with a Bachelor of Arts (Hons) and won a place to pursue a Certificate of Higher Education in music production and development at the University of Westminster, where she graduated in 2005. Sara chose photography as the first of her professional endeavours for its ability to create an instant bond between the artist and the outside world. In 2018, Sara completed a Master of Arts in Applied Imagination in the Creative Industries at Central Saint Martins specialising in the power of aesthetic and sensory experiences to shape our perception and perspectives on personal and global concerns.

== Work ==
Within her artistic practise Shamsavari explores themes of global identity, inclusion and transformation. Several of her projects centre around challenging stereotypes and common preconceived judgements based on labels including appearance, culture, religion and sexuality. The artists work was described by Sara Rosen in the following way "Shamsavari’s portraits create a connection between her subjects and the world, acting as a portal to a land where dignity and respect are the basis on which our humanity is met". Shamsavari's painting work incorporates Persian words that are obscured and sometimes illegible described by the artist as representing the uncertainty often experienced by migrants and refugees.The artist explains this in the following way "I hope the audience will consider the sensations that many migrants and particularly refugees feel, the desire and need to make sense of the world while nothing is certain. Often in our quest for clarity, stability, justice, safety, or the definition of our identities, we find our situations continually transforming almost as soon as they have been defined". The artist's work has been widely recognised, published and featured across media including BBC, ITN, The Guardiani-D, Dazed & Confused, Volt The New York Times, Vogue and Monocle 24. In 2015 her works were published in ReSignifications ( Awam Amkpa, Postcart ) and in 2017 as part of Dandy Lion Street Style ( Shantrelle P. Lewis, Aperture) .

Sara's work has exhibited in museums and public spaces around the world including the Institute of Contemporary Art, City Hall, The Royal Festival Hall, Bethlem Gallery, Brighton Photo Biennial, MoCP ( Chicago), Lowe Art Museum ( Miami) Espace Pierre Cardin, (Paris), MANIFESTA Biennial ( Palermo), Museo Bardini (Florence) Nathan Cummings Foundation ( New York) and Centro Provincial des Artes y Diseño( Havana). The artist is a recipient of the Visa Pioneer 20 award that recognises women from refugee backgrounds who have dedicated their lives to giving back and positive change. Shamsavari's contributions were also recognised in an artistic installation by Yinka Shonibare MBE entitled The British Museum displayed at Tate Modern. The display notes first or second-generation immigrants to Britain who have made significant contributions to British culture and history, printed their names in gold on the spines of books bound in African wax print fabric, the artist's signature material.

Shamsavari regularly guest lectures at NYU Abu Dhabi and around the world in both educational and professional spheres including at UAL, UCA, John Cabot, Syracuse and global companies including ad agency J Walter Thompson. The artist has designed several courses for Central Saint Martins exploring art, identity and ethics in the arts and has been interviewed numerous times as an authority on these subjects. She has delivered workshops and artist talks, at institutions including Tate Britain, Kings Place, Southbank Centre (WOW Festival) and the Royal Institution of Great Britain.

Shamsavari is also a musician performing both solo and as part of choirs and collectives. She is a prominent member and artistic director with the Citizens of the World Choir.

Shamsavari is described as "energetic and forceful ... weighed with conviction" (The Guardian) with"the rare gift of capturing how the light strikes a face to illuminate hope" (Aesthetica), her work as "unflinchingly honest portraits" (Brownbook UAE)"revealing a unique empathy with her subjects"(i-D) and carrying "acute socio-political messages" (Flavorpill).
