= London Burning: Portraits from a Creative City =

2015 photography book

- First edition
- Editor: Hossein Amirsadeghi and Maryam Eisler
- Genre: Photography
- Publisher: Thames & Hudson
- Publication date: 2015

London Burning: Portraits from a Creative City is a 2015 book of photography of creativity in London, edited by Hossein Amirsadeghi and Maryam Eisler. It features numerous portraits of artists, DJs, and performers, such as Ron Arad, Matthew Bourne, André Balazs, Alan Rusbridger, Tim Marlow, Mark Hix, and Marc Quinn. Writing for Geographical, Mick Herron observed that "there’s not an image in the book that doesn’t illustrate the ways the city inspires artistic endeavour".
