= Fereydoon Motamed =

Iranian linguist and professor

Amir Fereydoon Motamed
- Born: October 6, 1917; Tehran, Iran
- Died: 13 July 1993 (aged 75); Charlottesville, Virginia, U.S.
- Education: Tehran University, Columbia University
- Occupations: Linguist, writer, Aesthetics critic
- Writing career
- Genres: Language, Structuralism, Structural linguistics, Aesthetics, Poetry, Metre (poetry), Versification, French literature, English literature, Persian literature, Indo-European languages, Music, Philosophy, Logic, Mathematics
- Movement: Metre (poetry)

Fereydoon Motamed, also known as Amir Fereydoun Motamed, Amir Fereydoon Motamed or Fereydoon H. Motamed, (1917–1993), was an Iranian linguist and professor and an authority on Persian poetic meters. He was the winner of the Louis de Broglie award, from the Académie française, and recipient of literary award "Le Grand Prix Littéraire d'Iran" from Writer's Association of French Language.

== Biography ==
Born 1917 in Tehran, Iran. Fereydoon was son of an Iranian surgeon, Dr. Hossein Khan Motamed, chief of the surgery department in Razi Hospital, Tehran, Iran (1919–20) and founder of Motamed Hospital in Tehran.

Fereydoun was inspired by paradigm of Structuralism as it pertains to linguistics. He devoted his life to research in aesthetics of linguistics, music, and poetry Versification in Indo-European languages using logic, and meter (poetry) metrics analysis. He was a professor of Language & Social Sciences and the director of the cultural activities committee at the Anglo Iranian Oil Company (AIOC) Institute of Technology, Abadan, Iran later renamed to Petroleum University of Technology. He is also the recipient of the Broglie award from the Académie française in 1963, and literary award "Le Grand Prix Littéraire d'Iran" from Writer's Association of French Language Association Des Ecrivains De Langues Françaises (A.D.E.L.F.) in 1976.

Mr. Motamed was a native of Iran and a resident of St. Mary's County, Maryland in the United States of America. He had his elementary and high school education in France near Paris. In 1946 he immigrated to the United States and earned his Master of Arts degree from Columbia University in New York City with his major in French literature. Later on, he devoted his life to research in the aesthetics of the temporal time in relation to the Indo-European languages and quantitative Meter (poetry), and he was the author of four books on that topic, the last of which is unpublished. His book De la metrique was honored to enrich the Nobel Library at Svenska Akademiens Nobelbibliotek, Börshuset, Stockholm, Sweden. He received many awards and praises from Académie française: Institute de France, Académie des Sciences, Paris, France, some of which are listed under the Awards and Honoraria.

He was the cultural representative of the Holland's house of students of the Cité Internationale Universitaire de Paris and a member of the Central Assembly of the former students of the Cité Internationale Universitaire de Paris. He was the professor of Language & Social Sciences and the director of the cultural activities committee, Anglo Iranian Oil Company (AIOC) Institute of Technology, also known as Petroleum University of Technology, Abadan, Iran. He also was the English and French professor and chairman of the French department, Bu-Ali Sina University, Hamadan, Iran.

His first book "De la Métrique: ou des accords des temps révolutifs dans les langues quantitativement flexionnelles", published in 1962, studies and analyzes aesthetics of linguistics and poetry in Indo-European languages using metrics analysis.

His next book "Précis Logistique de l'harmonie métrique", published in 1963, is a complement on the scientific aspects of temporal proportions viewed as harmonic rings and sets.

His third book "La métrique diatemporelle: ou des accords de temps revolutifs dans les langues à flexions quantitatives", published in 1974, is a richer study and analysis of quantitative poetic meters, the measured characteristic movement of a verse, of the Indo-European languages. In 1984, a manuscript of his latest research led to the very origin of the well tempered quantitative poetic meters of the Indo-Persian languages. This manuscript was a complement to the 1974 publication, "La métrique diatemporelle". The structured approach which finally led him to the Greek linear musical scales and harmonics and consequently to the cybernetic models regulating the rings of aesthetic group, deals evidently with the intensive forms of diachronic harmony; however, he believed that in languages where the short syllables are more frequent than the long ones (referring to the duration without any other arbitrary engagement which may be added to it) extensive diachronic eurythmy is in fact not only practicable, but very valuable too. An exemplary copy of the manuscript was sent to the Director of the Library of the Irish Academy.

Prior to his sudden death, he completed his 41 years of research on aesthetics of temporal time in relation to the Indo-European languages, and among his new findings he found a universal formula (what he used to call the "absolute zero" of linguistics) that is applicable to quantitative poetic meters of all the Indo-European languages. He claimed that this was root cause for why certain languages will become extinct (language death) in near future; however, he did not have the chance to finalize the editing of the fourth edition of his book in that subject, but his unpublished manuscripts are available for sharing upon request.

He died a sudden death from heart attack on 13 July 1993 in Charlottesville, Virginia. He is buried in Williamsburg Memorial Park in Williamsburg West, Virginia.

== Awards and honors ==
- Jan 24, 1963 received the Louis de Broglie award from the Académie française: Institute de France, Académie des Sciences, Paris, France.
- Sep 10, 1964 His book De la metrique was honored to enrich the Nobel Library at Svenska Akademiens Nobelbibliotek, Börshuset, Stockholm, Sweden.
- 1976 Received the literary award "Le Grand Prix Littéraire d'Iran" from Writer's Association of French Language (ASSOCIATION DES ECRIVAINS DE LANGUES FRANçAISES : A.D.E.L.F.).

== Publications ==
- 1974 Published La métrique diatemporelle, ou des accords de temps revolutifs dans les langues à flexions quantitatives, Tehran, Iran. This is a richer study and analysis of quantitative Meter (poetry), the measured characteristic movement of a verse, of the Indo-European languages, Dépôt légal 1903, 1974.
- 1963 Published the Précis Logistique de l'harmonie métrique, Tehran, Iran. A complement on the scientific aspects of temporal proportions viewed as harmonic rings and sets, Dépôt légal 183, 1963.
- 1962 Published the book De la Métrique: Motamed, Amir Ferydoun (see also the digital copy in external references). De la metrique, ou des accords des temps révolutifs dans les langues guantitativement flexionnelles — Téhran : Khoushé, 1962 . — 133 p.; 24 cm. Solicitar por: 801.6 M 917. Using metrics analysis, this book studies and analyzes aesthetics of linguistics and poetry in Indo-European languages, Dépôt légal 166, 1962. Although this book was never fully distributed to the public a few places do have a copy on hand. A copy of the book can be found at New York City's central library, call number JFE 74-2220.
- 1953 Published a few artistic and literary articles on theater and art in the student magazine of the Cité Internationale Universitaire de Paris.

== Offices held ==
- 1977-79 English and French Professor and Chairman of the French Department, Bu-Ali Sina University, Hamadan, Iran.
- 1972 Captain of the Persian Tennis team for the Iranian Tennis team during the International Tennis Federation Davis Cup Series in Imperial Tennis Club, Tehran, Iran. See also Iran Davis Cup team
- 1968 Member of the Central Assembly of the former students of the Cité Internationale Universitaire de Paris.
- 1968-69 Director of the cultural activities committee, Anglo Iranian Oil Company (AIOC) Institute of Technology (later renamed Petroleum University of Technology), Abadan, Iran.
- 1964-69 Professor of Language & Social Science, Petroleum University of Technology, Abadan, Iran.
- 1953 Cultural representative of the Holland's house of students of the Cité Internationale Universitaire de Paris.
- 1944 Technical Assistant and first class English translator to the Director General of the personnel administration of the ministry of finance. Employer: W. Brownrigg.
- 1942 Technical adviser and English translator for the Persian allies at the Persian Railways during World War II. Employer: Col. Henry Dawes.

== See also ==
- Endangered language
- Language death
- Extinct language
