= Taraneh Hemami =

Iranian-born American visual artist (born 1960)

- ترانه همامی
- Born: 1960 (age 65–66); Tehran, Imperial State of Iran
- Education: University of Oregon (BFA); California College of the Arts (MFA)
- Occupations: Visual artist, curator, educator
- Known for: multidisciplinary projects addressing Iranian diaspora
- Website: Official website

Taraneh Hemami (born 1960; Persian: ترانه همامی) is an Iranian-born American visual artist, curator, and arts educator based in San Francisco. Her works explore the complex cultural politics of exile through personal and collective, multidisciplinary projects often through site specific installation art or participatory engagement projects.

== Biography ==
Taraneh Hemami was born in 1960, in Tehran. She moved to the United States in 1978 to attend college, right before the Iranian Revolution. In 1982, Hemami received her BFA degree in painting and drawing from University of Oregon, Eugene; and in 1991 a MFA degree in painting from California College of the Arts (CCA) in San Francisco, where she now teaches.

Hemami's work is often handcrafted and has included replicating government posters, shattered glass stylized as traditional Muslim prayer rugs, a laser-cut wool carpet map of Tehran and beaded curtains. By manipulating common Iranian and Western imagery used to gain power and spread political influence, Hemami's work is a commentary on how this is used across nations throughout history. In her work "Home" (2006), she created a multimedia body of work by collecting photographs and stories from Iranian Americans to explore themes of displacement and representation within a home.

In 2014, Hemami curated Theory of Survival: Fabrications at the Southern Exposure gallery. Hemami co-curated the 2019 multi-disciplinary group exhibition, Once at Present: Contemporary Art of Bay Area Iranian Diaspora at Minnesota Street Project in San Francisco.

== Exhibitions ==
Hemami has exhibited at national and international venues as well as guest curated exhibitions, including the following:

- 2002: Hall of Reflections, San Francisco Arts Commission (SFAC), San Francisco, California
- 2003: Hall of Reflections, 6th International Sharjah Biennial, Sharjah Art Museum, Sharjah, United Arab Emirates
- 2008: Evocations, Rose Issa Projects, London, England
- 2008: Theory of Survival for BAN 5 at Yerba Buena Center for the Arts, San Francisco, California (guest curation)
- 2008: Theory of Survival for BAN 5 at The Lab, San Francisco, California (guest curation)
- 2009: One Day: a Collective Narrative of Tehran at Intersection for the Arts (guest curation)
- 2010: Time after Time at Southern Exposure, San Francisco, California (guest curation)
- 2011: Zendegi: Twelve Contemporary Iranian Artists, Beirut Exhibition Center, Lebanon
- 2011: A Dream of Eternity: The Artist Long Time East, Villa Empain, Brussels, Belgium
- 2014: Fabrications, Theory of Survival Project, Southern Exposure Gallery, San Francisco, California
- 2014: Bulletin, Theory of Survival Project, California Institute of Integral Studies (CIIS), San Francisco, California
- 2019: Once at Present: Contemporary Art of Bay Area Iranian Diaspora, co-curator alongside Kevin B. Chen, Minnesota Street Project, San Francisco, California

== Collections, residencies and awards ==
Hemami's works have been collected internationally by major public collections including; the British Museum, the Victoria and Albert Museum, as well as many private collections. Hemami received a Creative Capital Award (2012), Eureka fellowship award (2012), Creative Work Fund (2000), the San Francisco Arts Commission, California Council for the Humanities (Cal Humanities), San Francisco Foundation, and a Visions from the New California award (2004). She has been in residence at the California Institute for Integral Studies (CIIS) (2013 – 2014), Djerassi Resident Artists Program, Montalvo Arts Center, Kala Art Institute (2007), The Lab and the Center for Public Life at the California College of the Arts (CCA) in Oakland, California.

== See also ==
- List of Iranian women artists
