= Guity Novin =

Artist

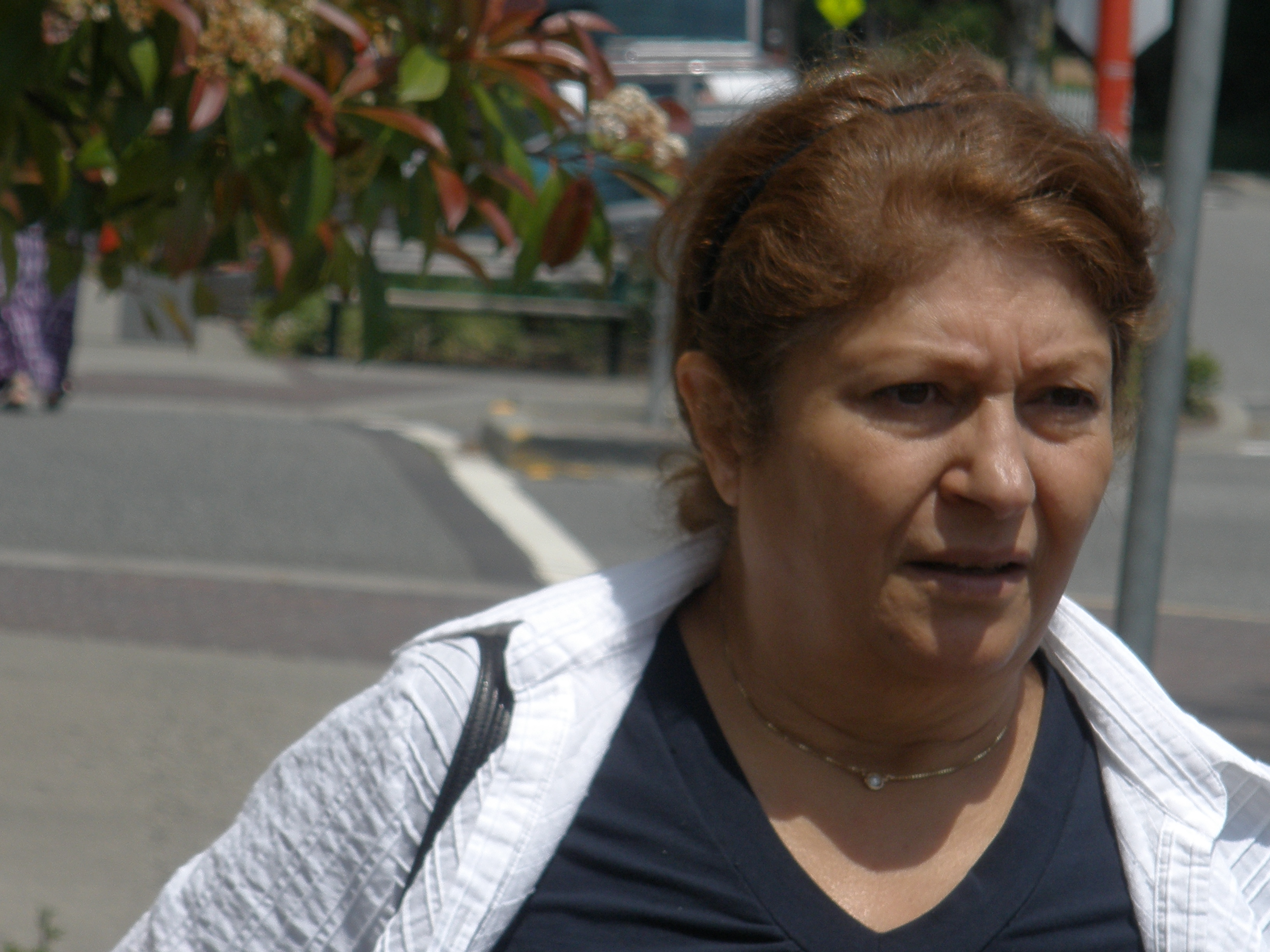
- Born: Guity Navran; 1944 (age 81–82); Kermanshah, Imperial State of Iran
- Education: Faculty of Decorative Arts, Tehran
- Known for: Oil painter; Watercolorist; Mixed media artist; Graphic design

Guity Novin (Persian: گیتی نوین; born 1944), née Navran (Persian: ناوران), is an Iranian-born Canadian artist, known as a figurative painter and graphic designer. She classifies her work as "transpressionism" (trans- and impressionism), a term coined by Novin in the 1990s. Her works are in private and public collections worldwide. Novin has served on a UNESCO national committee of artists.

== Early and personal life ==
Novin was born Guity Navran in 1944 in Kermanshah, Iran. In early 1953, the Navran family moved to Tehran. She is married to economist Farid Novin.

== Career ==
After graduating from the Faculty of Fine Arts with a BA in graphic design, in 1970 Novin was employed as a graphic designer in the Department of Graphic Arts at the Ministry of Culture and Arts (MCA) in Tehran, in 1970. She also began to design the cover of magazines like Zaman, and various literally periodicals such as Chaapar, and Daricheh.

In addition she participated in numerous group exhibitions such as the Women artists exhibition during Asian Games of 1974. As well, She exhibited in the Salon d' autumn, Paris.

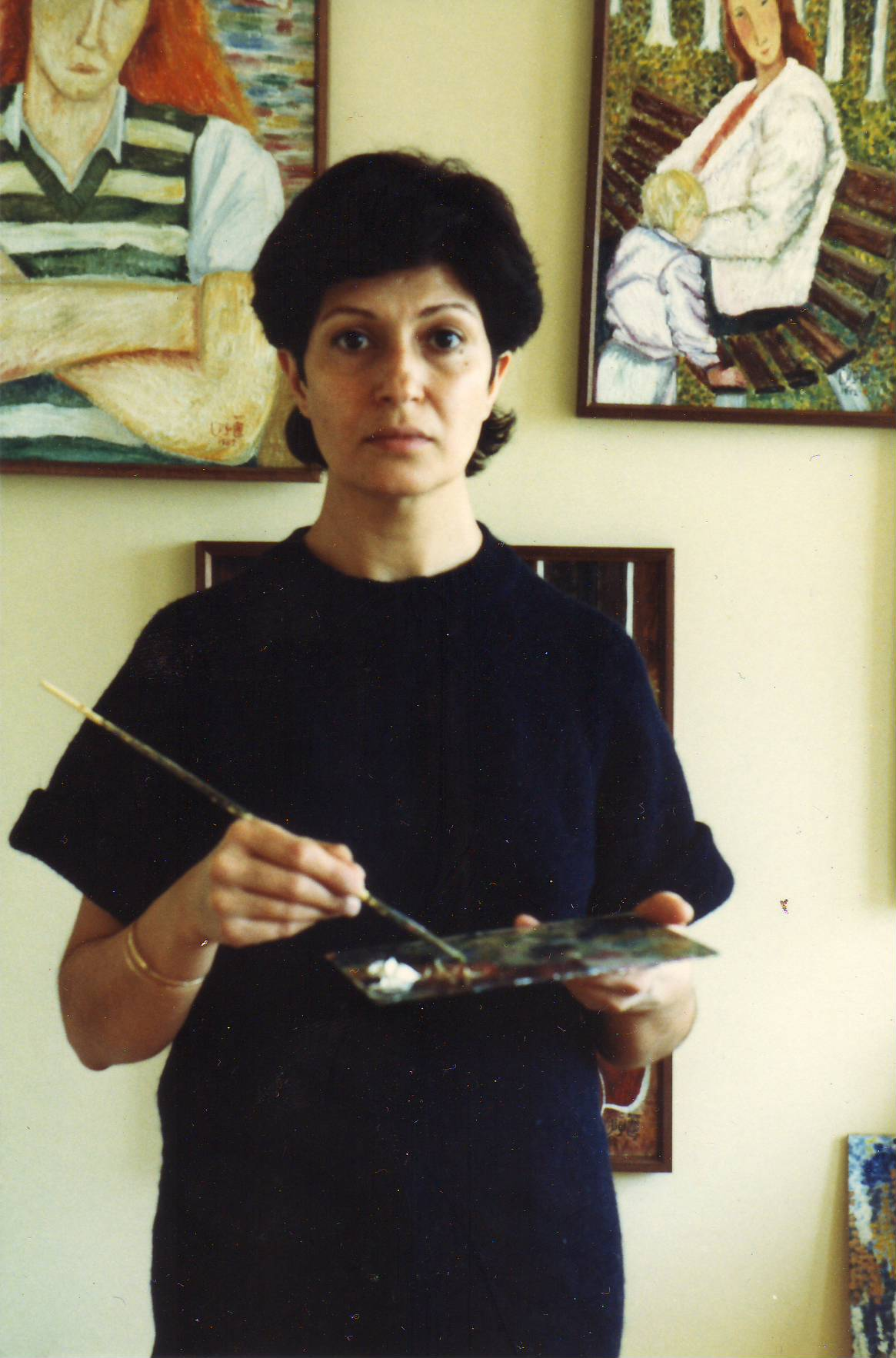
Novin in her studio in Kingston, Ontario, 1981

Her illustrations were published in Le Carnaval de la licorne (2001), and her work Pears in Blue was published in Abnormal Psychology.

=== Vancouver period, 1996 to present ===
Novin moved to Vancouver in 1996. From 1996 onwards in a series of shows, she called her style as Transpressionism, and viewed it as a new initiative in art. Solo shows in this period include The Bliss of Solitude (2004), And Yet the Menace of the Years Find, and Shall Find, Me Unafraid (2006), Whispered of peace, and truth, and friendliness unquelled (2007), 'She opened her door and her window, And the heart and the soul came through" (2008), and "but love is the sky and I am for you, just so long and long enough" (2009) (All at North Vancouver Community Arts Council, "Art in Garden"). She also participated in a number of group shows, including two shows at the Ferry Building Gallery in 2006 and 2008, and in the CityScape gallery in 2009.

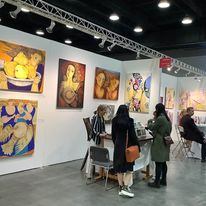
Guity Novin at Art Vancouver, International Art fair, at Canada Place, 2022

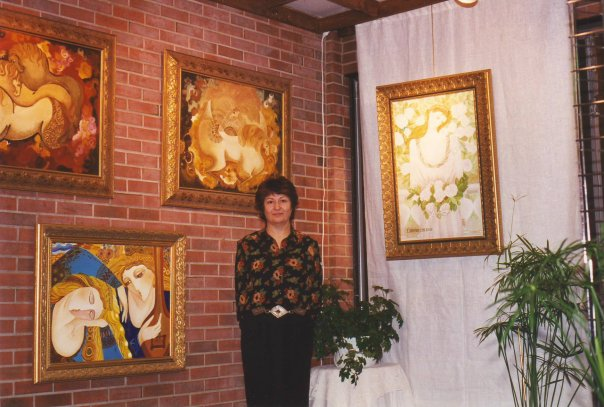
ٰGuity Novin's Exhibition in Artex Gallery at ByWard Market, Ottawa 1994

=== Graphic design work ===
Novin has illustrated the covers of magazines like Negin and Zaman; and the publications of the Free Cinema of Iran. She was also the graphic designer of the First Tehran International Film Festival. In Ottawa her illustrations were published in the Breaking The Silence Magazine during the 1980s.

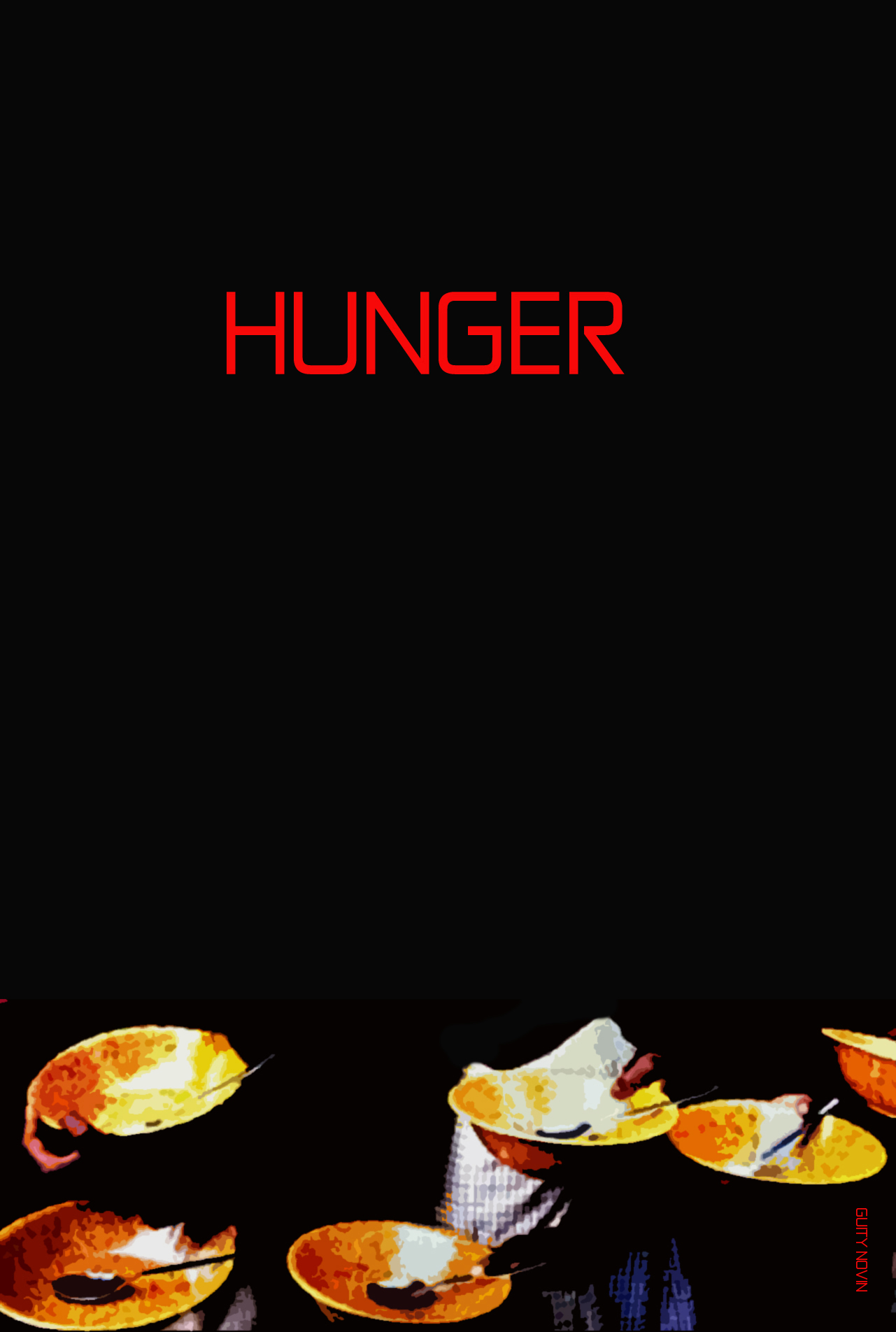
Poster protesting hunger, 2010

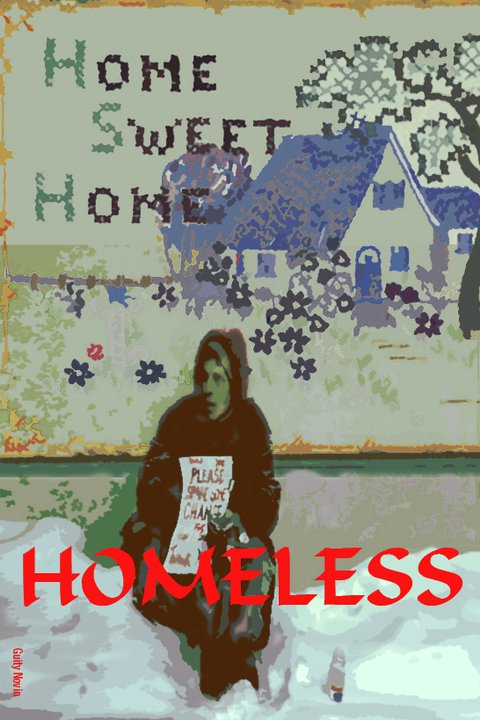
Poster protesting homelessness, 2010

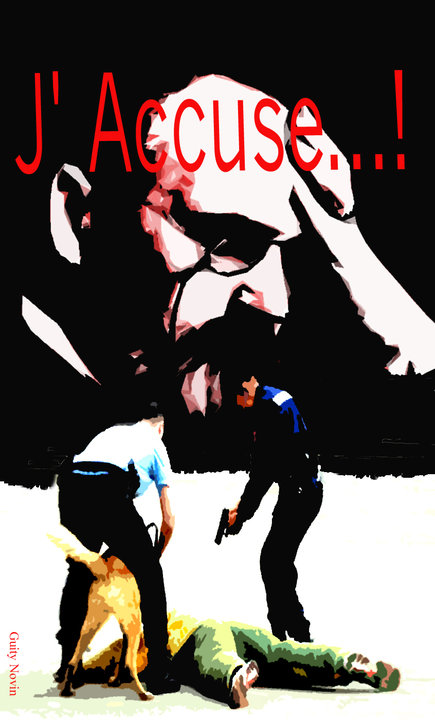
Poster protesting the treatment of Roma gypsies by France
