= Alzahra University =

Public university in Iran

- Former name: Farah Pahlavi University
- Motto: Literate Woman, Flourishing Society
- Type: Public
- Established: 1964; 62 years ago
- Chancellor: Zahra Nazem Bokaei
- Academic staff: 434
- Students: 8,861
- Undergraduates: 6,263
- Postgraduates: 3,791
- Doctoral students: 536
- Location: Tehran, 1993893973, Iran; 35°46′03″N 51°23′33″E
- Campus: Urban
- Website: en.alzahra.ac.ir

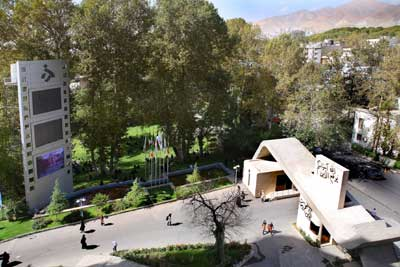
Alzahra University

Alzahra University (Persian: دانشگاه الزهرا, romanized: Dāneshgāh-e Alzahrā) is a female-only public university in the Vanak neighborhood of Tehran, Iran. Alzahra University is the only comprehensive women's university in Iran and the Middle East. Acceptance to the university is competitive and entrance to undergraduate and graduate programs requires scoring among the top 1% of students in the Nationwide University Entrance Exams. Alzahra University is ranked second in Iran and 201–300 in the world, according to University Impact Rankings 2019, Times Higher Education (THE). Alzahra University ranked 17th in Iran and number 801+ worldwide, according to the physical sciences subject ranking, World University Rankings 2019 by Times Higher Education.

== History and profile ==
The university, founded by Queen Farah Pahlavi in 1964, began as a private institution under the title of the Higher Educational Institute for Girls with 90 students. After the 1979 Iranian Revolution, the university attained public status and was renamed Mahboubeh Mottahedin after an Iranian Revolutionary who was killed before the 1979 revolution. In 1983, the university was renamed Alzahra University. The university offers 51 undergraduate, 83 graduate, and 31 post-graduate programs to 10,000 students. The university has ten faculties and a research center for women's studies, as well as a branch in the city of Urmia (the capital of West Azerbaijan province) and two self-supporting campuses.

The faculties of Alzahra University are Art, Biological Sciences, Education and Psychology, Engineering and Technology, Literature and Languages, Mathematical Sciences, Physical Education, Physics and Chemistry, Social and Economic Sciences, and Theology.

The university initiated its graduate studies program in 1990, under the supervision of the Vice Chancellery for Academic Affairs, by establishing an Educational Psychology master's degree program and admitting 11 students. It then established five fields and admitted 36 students in 1993. In 1994, the Graduate Studies Affairs was established and commenced its mission with 158 students in eight master's degree fields. The first PhD examination was administered in the major of Islamic History in the same year.

The university offers doctoral programs in history (Islamic history and history of Islamic Iran), psychology, economics, research in art, chemistry, physics, and applied mathematics.

== Faculty members ==
The academic faculty of the university is a community of some 350 tenured scholars teaching and conducting research. The professors work in collaboration with visiting colleagues from other Iranian universities.

== Collaborations with other universities ==
Alzahra University is a member of the International Association of Universities (IAU) and the Federation of Universities of the Islamic World (FUIW), and has established close ties and signed more than 45 Memoranda of Understanding (MoUs) for academic-research collaborations with accredited universities and research centers worldwide from a variety of countries, such as Pakistan, Iraq, Germany, Uganda, France, Russia, India, Kyrgyzstan, China, the Philippines, Indonesia, Syria, Libya, Belarus, among others.

== Facilities ==
Alzahra University has central and faculty libraries with 77,000 hard copies of books (33,000 of which are in English), and 930 Persian and English academic journals. Among other facilities offered at Alzahra University are electronic libraries, professional laboratories, language labs, computer labs, an art gallery, an educational center, business incubators, pool and sports facilities, food centers and a traditional Iranian restaurant, whose building is over 120 years old. A post office, bank, travel agency office, cellphone services office, grocery store, bookstore and photocopy kiosk are on campus.

== Department and research centers ==
- Department of physical education and sport sciences
- Department of literature, language and history
- Department of physics and chemistry
- Department of biological sciences
- Department of mathematics
- Department of social sciences and economics
- Department of engineering
- Department of psychology
- Department of theology
- Department of art
- Women research center

== Campuses ==
- Alborz campus
- International campus
- Urmia branch

== Research and publications ==
Eighteen academic journals are published by the university, such as Journal of Applied Biology, Journal of Brand Management, Women's Sociological and Psychological Studies, Women and Family Studies, Applied Physics, Historical Perspective & Historiography, History of Islam and Iran, Language Research, and many more. 6,000 theses and dissertations reside in the Central Library of the university.

== International students ==
The university offers its undergraduate, graduate, and postgraduate programs to international students. Around 128 international students study at Alzahra University, from Afghanistan, Pakistan, Iraq, Lebanon, Nigeria, Turkey, Syria, Tajikistan, and Tanzania. Some of the facilities for international students are:

- Offering Persian language courses at the university's Persian Language Center
- Offering some courses in English upon popular demand
- Insurance
- On-campus dormitory
- Access to all amenities of the university and dormitory, equaling the access of Iranian students. These include, among others:
- Swimming pool
- Sports complex
- Computer labs and free Wi-Fi access
- Student clubs
- General and professional libraries
- Counseling services
- Participation and membership in sport competitions, socio-cultural gatherings, and productive, entertaining, and cultivating student events

== Alzahra University in Ranks ==
University rankings
- Alzahra University

Global – Overall
- THE World: +1000 (2021)

Ranked 601–800 for Engineering and Technology in Times Higher Education Ranking 2020

Ranked 557 for Natural Sciences and 371 for Technical Sciences in Round University Ranking 2019

Ranked 201 in Times Higher Education University Impact Ranking 2019

Ranked 68 in UI Green Metric 2018

== Notable people ==
- Poopak Niktalab, graduated in mathematics, author and literary researcher
- Yadollah Ordokhani, Iranian mathematician
- Rashin Kheirieh, Iranian Illusttator
- Bijan Jenab, Iranian graphic designer and professor

== See also ==
- List of Islamic educational institutions
