= Shabnam K. Ghazi =

Iranian-born Canadian artist (born 1971)

- شبنم ک. قاضی
- Born: 1971 (age 54–55); Tehran, Pahlavi Iran
- Education: York University, Christie's Education
- Occupation: Visual artist
- Known for: Woven mixed media work, video art, installation art, printmaking, painting
- Website: shabnamkghazi.com

Shabnam K. Ghazi (Persian: شبنم ک. قاضی; born 1971) is an Iranian-born multidisciplinary visual artist, based in Toronto. She is known for her woven works, with themes of memory, identity, and heritage.

== Life and career ==
Shabnam K. Ghazi was born in 1971, in Tehran, Pahlavi Iran. She moved to Toronto, Canada in 2001. Ghazi attended York University in Toronto, and Christie's Education in New York City. She also took classes at the Toronto School of Business, through Career Edge.

Her art studio is in Artscape Youngplace, a community cultural hub in West Queen West, Toronto.

== Exhibitions ==
=== Solo exhibitions ===
- 2025 - Dear You, Dear Me, solo exhibition, Olga Korper Gallery, Toronto, Canada
- 2018 – Once Upon A Time in Tehran, solo exhibition, Olga Korper Gallery, Toronto, Canada
- 2021 – I've Run Every Red Light on Memory Lane, solo exhibition, Olga Korper Gallery, Toronto, Canada

=== Group exhibitions ===
- 2016 – Contemporary Women Artists From Iran, Edward Hopper House Art Center, 82 North Broadway, Nyack, New York, U.S.; three-person exhibition with Roya Farassat and Golnar Adili
- 2019 – 13th Havana Biennial, Havana, Cuba
- 2021 – Mes Histoires Courent, Courent, Pierre François Ouellette art contemporain (PFOAC), Montreal, Quebec, Canada; curated by Marie-Jeanne Musiol and Pierre François Ouellette, and featuring artists Ghazi, Shahla Bahrami, and Leila Zelli
- 2024 – Decade:10 Years of Creation at Youngplace, Koffler Gallery, Toronto, Canada; curated by David Liss, and featuring artists Ghazi, Barbara Astman, Midi Onodera, Ruth Adler, Gillian Iles, Vid Ingelevics, Carolyn Murphy, and Matthew Schofield.
- 2025- Fortitude /Fragile, Curated by Magda Gonzalez-Mora, Onsite Gallery, OCAD University, Toronto, Ontario, Canada.

== See also ==
- List of Iranian women artists
