= Aun Gallery =

Aun Gallery is a contemporary art gallery in Iran's capital city Tehran. It is owned and created by Afarin Neyssari. The building has 120 square meters of open exhibition space, a five-meter high ceiling and a paneled roof.

== Imprisonment of owner ==
Aun's owner, Afarin Neyssari, and her husband Karan Vafadari were arrested in Tehran's Imam Khomeini International Airport by Iran's Islamic Revolutionary Guards Intelligence Service (IRGIS) on 20 July 2016 when she was about to board a plane to travel to Italy in order to jump start an important art project, which was to prepare for Bizhan Bassiri's solo exhibition at the Venice Biennale festival as approved and certified by the Tehran Museum of Contemporary Art and the Minister of Culture. Karan was supposed to join her a few days later on their trip, and to visit his three children who live in the US. Karan received a call from Afarin, and when he went to see her he too was arrested.

Afarin and Karan were held in solitary confinement for over one month, and were not allowed to speak to a lawyer for 5 months. Afarin first spoke to a lawyer when she first showed up in court, 5 months after imprisonment. The Iranian judiciary coerced the family to dismiss their chosen lawyer multiple times, and as of May 2017, they had not found a suitable lawyer. As a Zoroastrian, Karan could be another example in a history of confiscation of Zoroastrians' property.

Karan is a US citizen, and Afarin is a US permanent resident. A wave of public support for Karan and Afarin followed, from the artistic community within Iran, as well as from customers and friends of Aun Gallery. Robert Toscano, former ambassador from Italy to Iran, in an open letter called their detention "political blackmail toward the US" and "intimidation toward the Zoroastrian community, desire to grab their properties, [and] repression of contemporary art.”

== Media ==
Aun Gallery has appeared in publications including Bidoun,

== Artists ==
Artists shown at the gallery include:

- Amin Aghaei
- Darvish Fakhr
- Golnar Adili
- Mohammad Hossein Emad
- Nazgol Ansarinia

== See also ==
- Iranian modern and contemporary art
- List of Iranian artists
