= Roya Farassat =

Iranian-born American artist (born 1964)

- رویا فراست
- Born: 1964 (age 61–62); Tehran, Pahlavi Iran
- Education: Parsons School of Design (BFA)
- Occupation: Visual artist
- Known for: Painting, sculpture
- Website: royafarassat.com

Roya Farassat (Persian: رویا فراست; born 1964) is an Iranian-born American visual artist, based in New York City.

== Life and career ==
Roya Farassat was born in 1964, in Tehran, Pahlavi Iran. She is Iranian Jewish. At the age of 14 in 1978, she moved to the United States prior to the Iranian Revolution. Farassat attended Parsons School of Design in New York City, where she received a BFA degree.

Farassat is known for her paintings and sculptures, she often works in metals like steel, as well as oil paint, and acrylics. Some of her work has an element of humor and it often investigates the identity of women living in contemporary Iran under Islam. Her art series A Mirror Has Two Faces, explores abstract portraits of women in veils, framed with Persian ornamental elements.

== Exhibitions ==
=== Solo and two-person exhibitions ===
- 2011 – A Mirror Has Two Faces, Leila Heller Gallery, New York City, New York, U.S.
- 2015 – Chaos, A Mind of Its Own, Shirin Gallery, Chelsea, New York City, New York, U.S.
- 2018 – Abstracting Materiality, Sapar Contemporary Art Gallery, New York City, New York, U.S.; two-person exhibition with Wyn-Lyn Tan
- 2022– As Near As Memory, Luis De Jesus Los Angeles, 1110 Mateo Street, Los Angeles, California, U.S.

=== Group exhibitions ===
- 2016 – Contemporary Women Artists From Iran, Edward Hopper House Art Center, 82 North Broadway, Nyack, New York, U.S.; three-person exhibition with Shabnam K. Ghazi and Golnar Adili
- 2017 – Echo, Gallery Kayafas, 450 Harrison Avenue, Boston, Massachusetts, U.S.; curated by Azita Moradkhani, and including artists Farassat, Samira Abbassy, Elnaz Javani, and Farid ud-Din Attar
- 2019 – A Bridge Between You and Everything: An Exhibition of Iranian Women Artists, High Line Nine Gallery, Chelsea, New York City, New York, U.S.; curated by Shirin Neshat

== See also ==
- List of Iranian women artists
