= Pierre-François Ouellette art contemporain =

Art gallery in Montreal, Canada

Coordinates: 45°31′31″N 73°34′31″W

Street view of the Pierre-François Ouellette Contemporary Art Gallery in Montreal taken in August 2026

Pierre-François Ouellette art contemporain (sometimes abbreviated as PFOAC) is a private, contemporary art gallery based in Montreal, Quebec, Canada. The gallery’s program is devoted to contemporary art practices that engage critically with social, cultural, and visual issues.

== History ==
The gallery was founded in October 2001 by gallerist Pierre-François Ouellette, on the second floor of the Belgo Building – a mixed-purpose complex well known for art galleries and located in the Quartier des spectacles district of downtown Montreal.

In 2016, the gallery moved to its current location at 963 Rachel Street East, in Montreal’s Plateau-Mont-Royal neighbourhood, near La Fontaine Park.

== Artists ==
Pierre-François Ouellette art contemporain represents Canadian and international contemporary artists, including:

- Ari Bayuaji
- Ludovic Boney
- James Lee Chiahan
- Luc Courchesne
- Jérôme Fortin
- Karilee Fuglem
- Adad Hannah
- Dil Hildebrand
- August Klintberg
- John Latour
- Meryl McMaster
- Marie-Jeanne Musiol
- Roberto Pellegrinuzzi
- Ed Pien
- Ripley Whiteside
- Leila Zelli

The gallery has represented or collaborated with numerous Canadian and international artists in the past including Shuvinai Ashoona, Michel de Broin, Alexandre Castonguay, Kota Ezawa, the Isuma Collective, Glenda León, Kent Monkman, Caroline Monnet, and Roland Poulin to name only a few.

== Exhibitions and activities ==
The gallery presents a regular program of solo exhibitions and group shows, highlighting contemporary art practices across disciplines. Its programming often includes collaborations with guest curators and thematic exhibitions addressing broader cultural and conceptual questions. On at least one occasion, the gallery has also been temporarily transformed into an artist-in-residence space and on another occasion, as an immersive art installation.

In addition to its exhibition program, the gallery participates in national and international contemporary art fairs including Art Forum Berlin, Art Toronto, LOOP Barcelona, The Photography Show (New York), Plural (Montreal), and Volta (art fair) (New York).

== Publications ==
Pierre-François Ouellette art contemporain has published over a dozen exhibition catalogues and related titles that document its programming and the work of its artists. The following selection of publications contributes to the critical dissemination of the gallery’s exhibitions and artistic research:

- Beaudet, Pascale. Jérôme Fortin: Tondos. Éditions pfoac, 2003.
- Campeau, Sylvain et al. Alexandre Castonguay: Extended Play. Éditions pfoac, 2005.
- Courchesne, Luc. Luc Courchesne. Éditions pfoac, 2006. ISBN 2980869546. [16] p.
- Davies, Jon. Mark Clintberg: Long Term Relationship. Éditions pfoac, 2016.
- De Sauriac, Udo Karl, and Eduardo Ralickas. Honeymoons: Michel de Broin + Ève K. Tremblay. Éditions pfoac, 2004.
- Musiol, Marie-Jeanne. La fôret radieuse: un herbier énergétique. Éditions pfoac, 2018.
- Musiol, Marie-Jeanne. Marie-Jeanne Musiol: Nouveaux Portraits / New Portraits. Éditions pfoac, 2004.
- Ouellette, Pierre-François. Mots Perdus / Lost Words: Michael A. Robinson, John Latour, Paul Butler, Mike Patten. Éditions pfoac, 2006.
- Pel, Andrew. John Player: Tactical Perspectives. Éditions pfoac, 2015.
- Webb, Nancy. Chih-Chien Wang: Singularity. Éditions pfoac, 2016.

== Recognition ==
The gallery has been cited in various media outlets and cultural guides for its important role within Montreal’s contemporary art scene and its sustained engagement with international art fairs and institutions.

At the inaugural Visual Arts Gala of 2011, organized by the Contemporary Art Galleries Association (AGAC), Pierre-François Ouellette was honoured as "Gallery Owner of the Year". In 2024, art critic Isa Tousignant named PFOAC the number one Montreal art gallery.
