= Leaves of Grass (disambiguation) =

Leaves of Grass is a collection of poetry by Walt Whitman, first published in 1855.

Leaves of Grass may also refer to:

- Leaves of Grass (film), a 2010 film
- Leaves of Grass, an artwork by Geoffrey Farmer
