= Zelli =

Zelli may refer to:

== People ==
- Abdollah Zelli, Commander of the Imperial Iranian Navy, 1941–1952
- Faramarz Zelli (1942–2025), Iranian football player
- Joe Zelli (1889–1971), owner of nightclubs in Paris and New York
- Leila Zelli (born 1981), Iranian-born Canadian visual artist, known for installation art

== Fictional people ==
- Stephan and Marya Zelli
  - characters in Quartet (novel, 1928)
  - characters in Quartet (film, 1981)
- John Zelli, character in Night Parade (film, 1928)

== See also ==
- Zeli
