= Karilee Fuglem =

Canadian artist

- Born: 1960 (age 65–66); Prince George, British Columbia
- Known for: Sculptor, installation artist
- Website: karileefuglem.com

Karilee Fuglem (born 1960) is a Canadian artist.

Her work is included in the collections of the Musée national des beaux-arts du Québec and the National Gallery of Canada. Fuglem's work is represented by Pierre-François Ouellette art contemporain (PFOAC), a contemporary art gallery in Montreal, Quebec.
