= List of Eurovision Song Contest host cities =

Countries and cities that have hosted the Eurovision Song Contest (Note: The 1990 contest was held in Zagreb, Yugoslavia. Following the breakup of Yugoslavia, Zagreb became the capital of present-day Croatia.) Countries that held a single contest Countries that held more than one contest

The Eurovision Song Contest is an annual international song competition held by the European Broadcasting Union (EBU) since 1956. This page is a list of cities and venues that have hosted the contest one or more times.

The contest has frequently been held in a capital city. The six (Note: The 2020 contest was cancelled due to the COVID-19 pandemic.) editions spanning from 2019 to 2025 are to date the longest span of consecutive editions without a capital hosting the event. This record was previously held by the four editions between 1956 and 1959.

== Host cities ==
No.	Country	City	Venue	Year	Ref.
9	United Kingdom	London	Royal Festival Hall	1960	
9	United Kingdom	London	BBC Television Centre	1963	
9	United Kingdom	London	Royal Albert Hall	1968	
9	United Kingdom	London	Wembley Conference Centre	1977	
9	United Kingdom	Edinburgh	Usher Hall	1972	
9	United Kingdom	Brighton	Brighton Dome	1974	
9	United Kingdom	Harrogate	Harrogate International Centre	1982	
9	United Kingdom	Birmingham	National Indoor Arena	1998	
9	United Kingdom	Liverpool	Liverpool Arena	2023	
7	Ireland	Dublin	Gaiety Theatre	1971	
7	Ireland	Dublin	RDS Simmonscourt Pavilion	1981	
7	Ireland	Dublin	RDS Simmonscourt Pavilion	1988	
7	Ireland	Dublin	Point Theatre	1994	
7	Ireland	Dublin	Point Theatre	1995	
7	Ireland	Dublin	Point Theatre	1997	
7	Ireland	Millstreet	Green Glens Arena	1993	
7	Sweden	Stockholm	Sankt Eriks-Mässan	1975	
7	Sweden	Stockholm	Globe Arena	2000	
7	Sweden	Stockholm	Globe Arena	2016	
7	Sweden	Gothenburg	Scandinavium	1985	
7	Sweden	Malmö	Malmö Isstadion	1992	
7	Sweden	Malmö	Malmö Arena	2013	
7	Sweden	Malmö	Malmö Arena	2024	
5	Netherlands	Hilversum	AVRO Studios	1958	
5	Netherlands	Amsterdam	RAI Congrescentrum	1970	
5	Netherlands	The Hague	Nederlands Congresgebouw	1976	
5	Netherlands	The Hague	Nederlands Congresgebouw	1980	
5	Netherlands	Rotterdam	Rotterdam Ahoy	~~2020~~ (Note: The 2020 contest was cancelled due to the COVID-19 pandemic.)	
5	Netherlands	Rotterdam	Rotterdam Ahoy	2021	
4	Luxembourg	Luxembourg City	Villa Louvigny	1962	
4	Luxembourg	Luxembourg City	Villa Louvigny	1966	
4	Luxembourg	Luxembourg City	Théâtre Municipal (Note: Known as the Nouveau Théâtre in 1973)	1973	
4	Luxembourg	Luxembourg City	Théâtre Municipal	1984	
3	France	Cannes	Palais des Festivals	1959	
3	France	Cannes	Palais des Festivals	1961	
3	France	Paris	Palais des Congrès	1978	
3	Austria	Vienna	Großer Festsaal der Wiener Hofburg	1967	
3	Austria	Vienna	Wiener Stadthalle	2015	
3	Austria	Vienna	Wiener Stadthalle	2026	
3	Norway	Bergen	Grieghallen	1986	
3	Norway	Oslo	Oslo Spektrum	1996	
3	Norway	Oslo	Telenor Arena	2010	
3	Germany (Note: The 1957 and 1983 contests were held in West Germany. The 2011 contest was held in reunified Germany.)	Frankfurt am Main	Großer Sendesaal des hessischen Rundfunks	1957	
3	Germany	Munich	Rudi-Sedlmayer-Halle	1983	
3	Germany	Düsseldorf	Düsseldorf Arena	2011	
3	Denmark	Copenhagen	Tivolis Koncertsal	1964	
3	Denmark	Copenhagen	Parken Stadium	2001	
3	Denmark	Copenhagen	B&W Hallerne	2014	
3	Israel	Jerusalem	International Convention Center	1979	
3	Israel	Jerusalem	International Convention Center	1999	
3	Israel	Tel Aviv	Expo Tel Aviv	2019	
3	Italy	Naples	Sala di Concerto della RAI	1965	
3	Italy	Rome	Stage 15, Cinecittà Studios	1991	
3	Italy	Turin	PalaOlimpico	2022	
3	Switzerland	Lugano	Teatro Kursaal	1956	
3	Switzerland	Lausanne	Palais de Beaulieu	1989	
3	Switzerland	Basel	St. Jakobshalle	2025	
2	Ukraine	Kyiv	Palace of Sports	2005	
2	Ukraine	Kyiv	International Exhibition Centre	2017	
1	Spain	Madrid	Teatro Real	1969	
1	Belgium	Brussels	Centenary Palace	1987	
1	Yugoslavia	Zagreb (Note: Now in present-day Croatia, following the breakup of Yugoslavia in the early 1990s.)	Vatroslav Lisinski Concert Hall	1990	
1	Estonia	Tallinn	Saku Suurhall	2002	
1	Latvia	Riga	Skonto Hall	2003	
1	Turkey	Istanbul	Abdi İpekçi Arena	2004	
1	Greece	Athens	Olympic Indoor Hall	2006	
1	Finland	Helsinki	Hartwall Arena	2007	
1	Serbia	Belgrade	Belgrade Arena	2008	
1	Russia	Moscow	Olimpiyskiy Arena	2009	
1	Azerbaijan	Baku	Baku Crystal Hall	2012	
1	Portugal	Lisbon	Lisbon Arena	2018	
1	Bulgaria	Burgas	Arena Burgas	2027	

=== Special events ===
Country	City	Venue	Event	Occasion	Year	Ref.
Norway	Mysen	Momarken	Songs of Europe	Commemorating the 25th anniversary of the contest	1981	
Slovenia	Ljubljana	TV SLO Studio 1	Kvalifikacija za Millstreet	Pre-qualification round held for the 1993 contest between eastern European countries	1993	
Denmark	Copenhagen	Forum Copenhagen	Congratulations: 50 Years of the Eurovision Song Contest	Commemorating the 50th anniversary of the contest	2005	
United Kingdom	London	Eventim Apollo	Eurovision Song Contest's Greatest Hits	Commemorating the 60th anniversary of the contest	2015	
Netherlands	Hilversum	Studio 21, Media Park	Eurovision: Europe Shine a Light	Replacement show for the 2020 contest, which was cancelled due to the COVID-19 pandemic	2020	

== Hosting traditions and exceptions ==
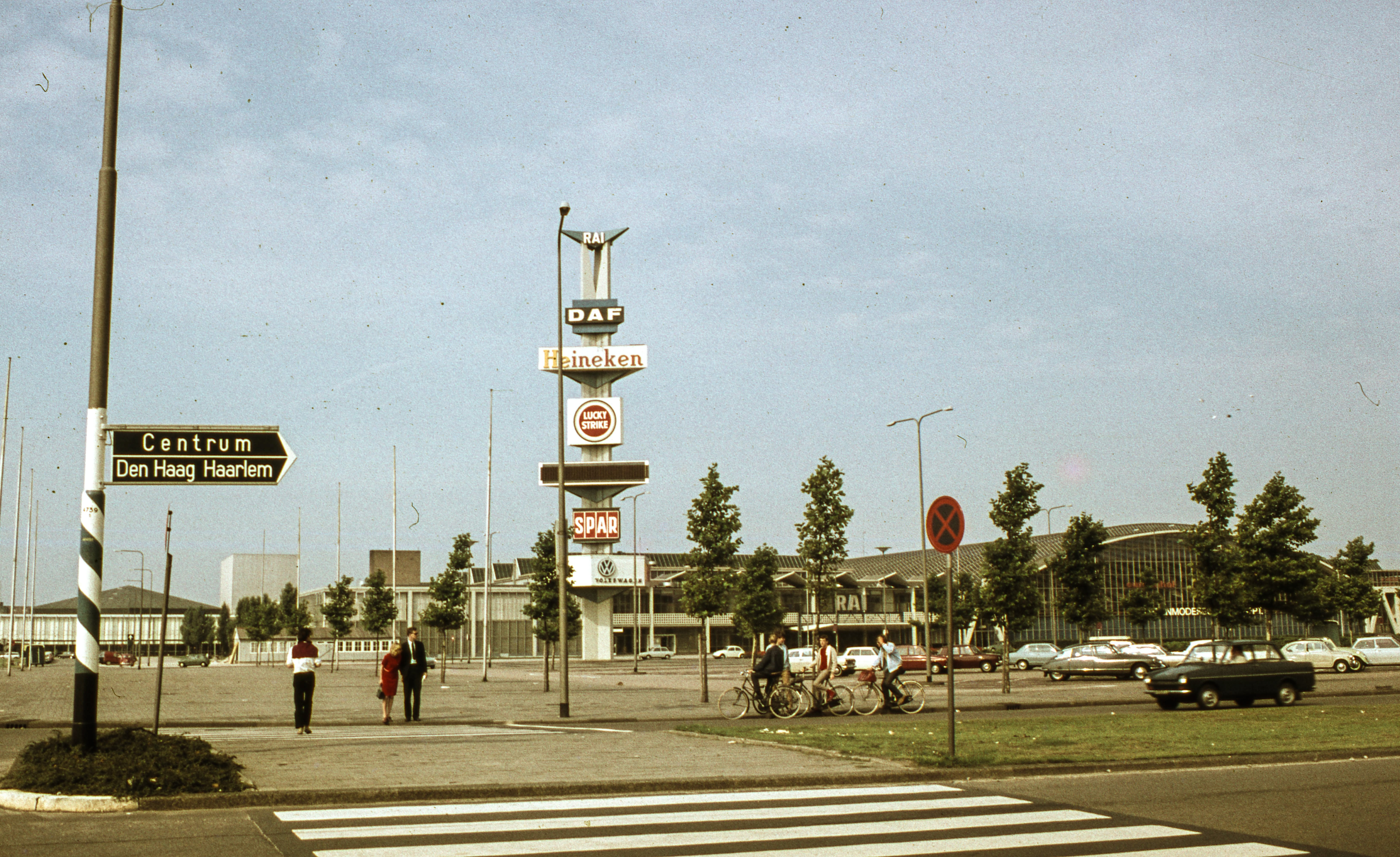
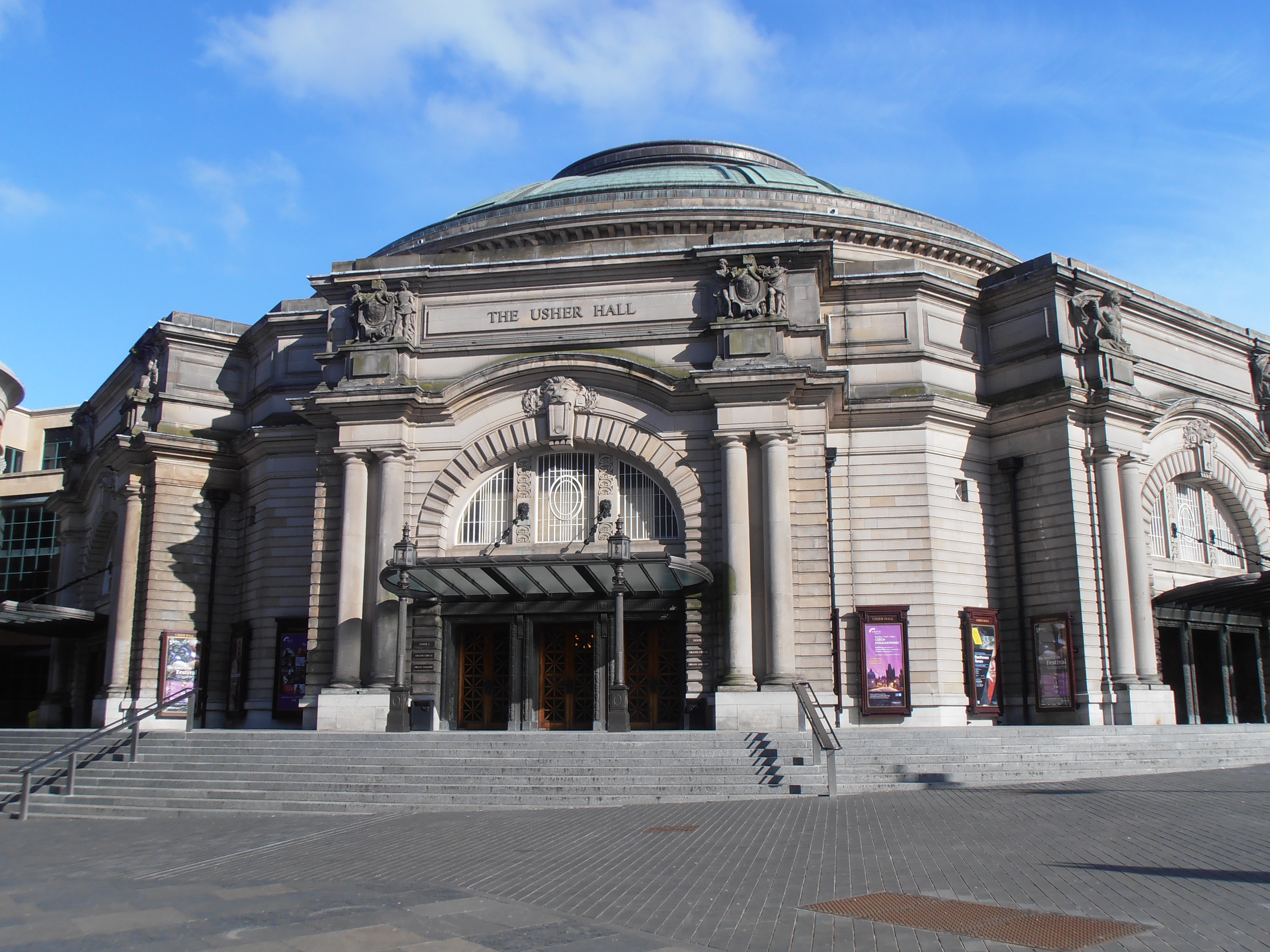

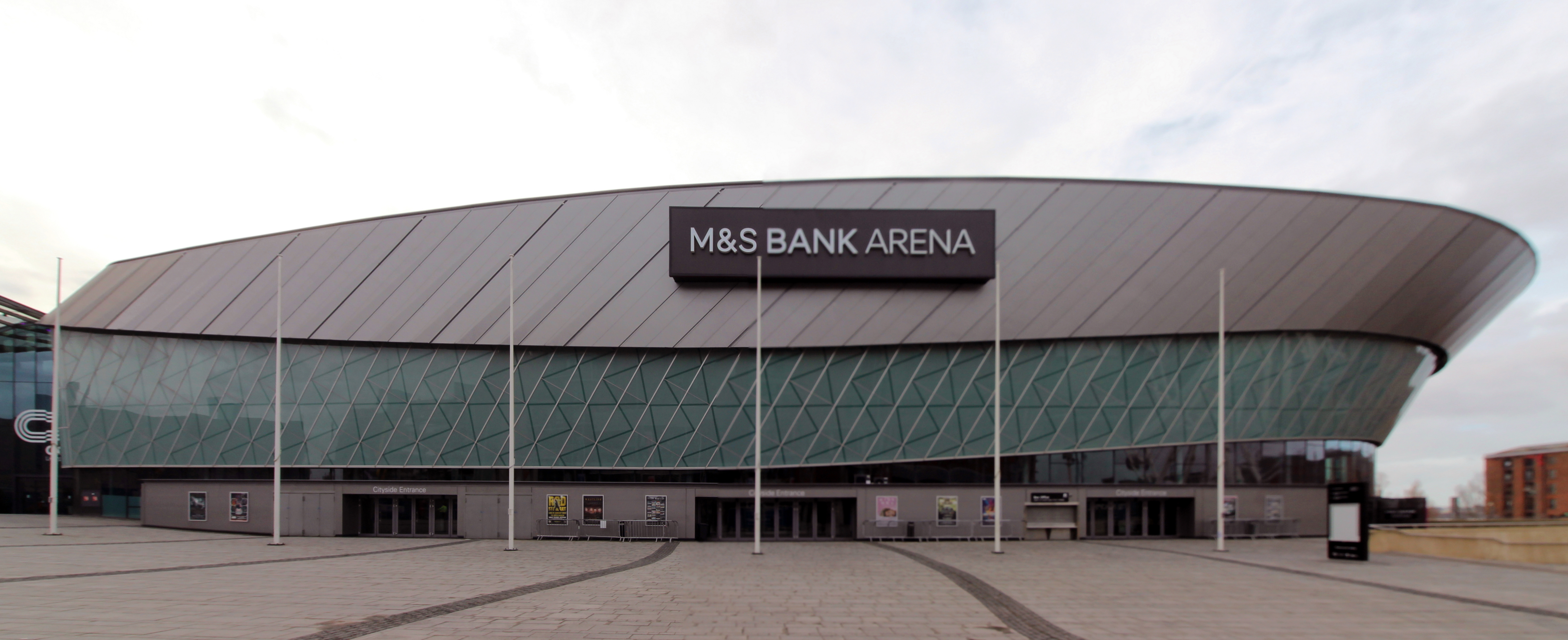
Amsterdam's RAI Congrescentrum, Edinburgh's Usher Hall, and the Liverpool Arena

The tradition of the winning broadcaster hosting the following year's event was established in 1958. A number of exceptions to this rule have occurred since, typically when the winning broadcaster had already hosted the event in the recent past. These exceptions are listed below:

- 1960: hosted by the British Broadcasting Corporation (BBC) in London when the Netherlands' Nederlandse Televisie Stichting (NTS) declined due to expense, having previously hosted the 1958 contest. The BBC was chosen to host after finishing in second place in 1959.
- 1963: hosted by the BBC in London when France's Radiodiffusion-Télévision Française (RTF) declined due to expense, having previously hosted the contest in 1959 and 1961. The second- and third-placed in 1962, Monaco's Télé Monte Carlo (TMC) and Luxembourg's Compagnie Luxembourgeoise de Télédiffusion (CLT) also declined when offered hosting duties.
- 1970: hosted by Nederlandse Omroep Stichting (NOS) in Amsterdam following a ballot to determine the host, after the 1969 contest produced four winners.
- 1972: hosted by the BBC in Edinburgh when Monaco's TMC was unable to provide a suitable venue. The second- and third-placed in 1971, Spain's Televisión Española (TVE) and Germany's ARD also declined when offered hosting duties. The EBU invited the BBC to host the event due to their previous experience.
- 1974: hosted by the BBC in Brighton when Luxembourg's CLT declined due to expense after staging the 1973 contest.
- 1980: hosted by NOS in the Hague when Israel's Israel Broadcasting Authority (IBA) declined due to expense after staging the 1979 contest. The Dutch offered to host the contest after several other broadcasters, reportedly including runner-up Spain's TVE and the BBC, were unwilling to do so.
- 2023: hosted by the BBC in Liverpool on behalf of Ukraine's Suspilne, after the EBU decided that Ukraine would not be able to host the event due to security concerns caused by the Russian invasion of Ukraine. The BBC was chosen to host after finishing in second place in 2022.

With Australia's invitation to participate in the contest in 2015, it was announced that should it win the contest, Australian broadcaster Special Broadcasting Service (SBS) would co-host the following year's contest in a European city in collaboration with an EBU member broadcaster of its choice. The rules were amended ahead of the 2027 contest to make a winning broadcaster ineligible to host the following edition if an armed conflict or sensitive geopolitical situation affects the security of their state or region, in which case the EBU would commission an independent assessment.

== Host city insignia ==
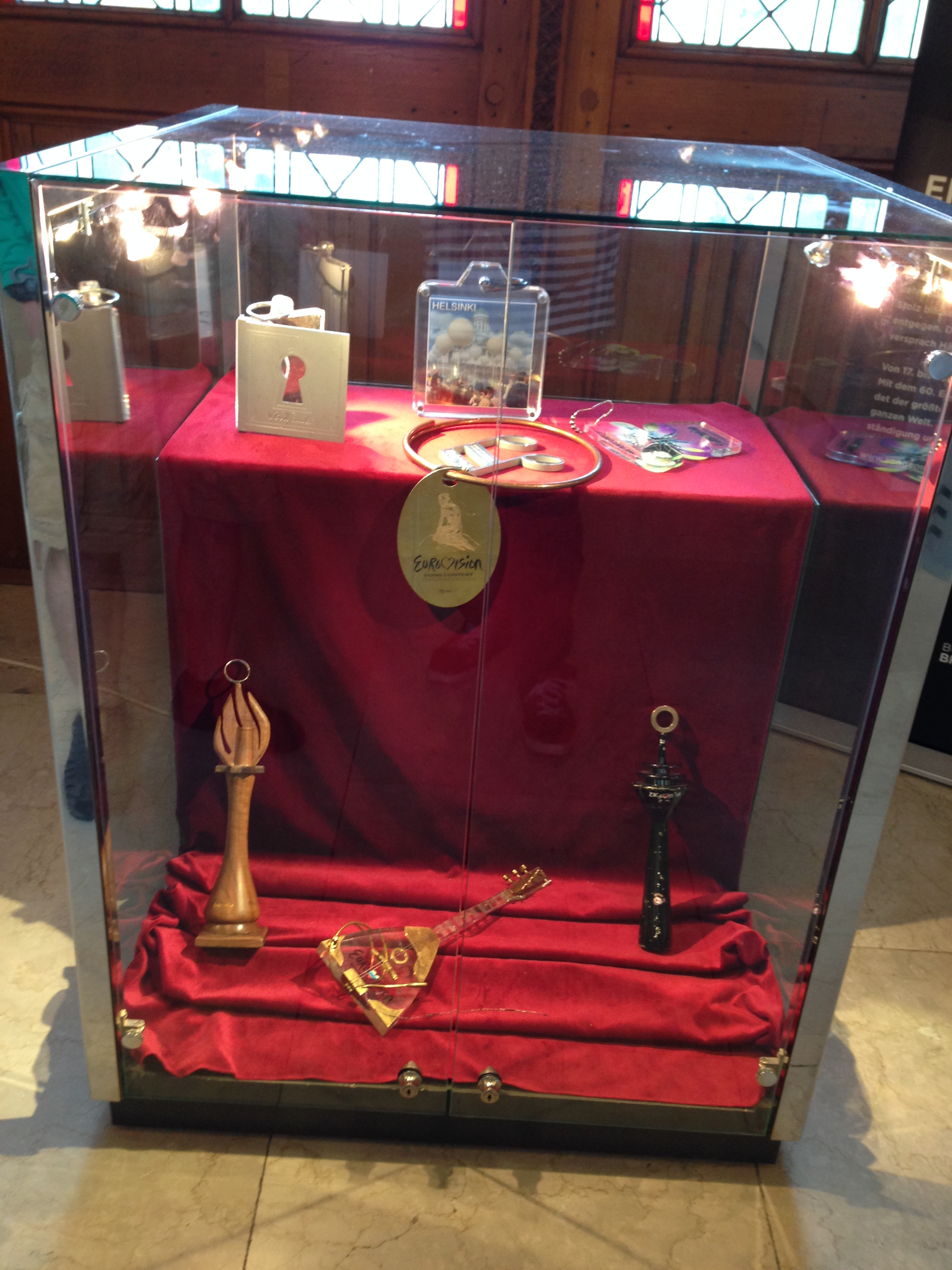
The host city insignia on display inside Vienna City Hall in May 2015.

The host city insignia is a rotating trophy awarded to cities hosting the Eurovision Song Contest, proposed jointly by the city of Helsinki, the Finnish broadcaster Yleisradio (Yle) and the EBU in conjunction with the 2007 edition, and was used annually until 2025.

The insignia takes the form of a large key ring to which the host cities can attach their city key or other symbol representing the city. The insignia exchange usually takes place in conjunction with the semi-final allocation draw. The insignia is then traditionally put on display in a public place, such as the city hall or another venue of local significance, for the remainder of the year. The insignia's concept and fob were designed by the Anteeksi group, while the key ring was designed by jewellery designer Taru Tonder. Hand-engraved on the ring are the following texts: "Eurovision Song Contest Host City", all host cities up until 2006, and a "Helsinki 2007" stamp with the initials of the insignia designers. Additionally, the fob has a picture of the Helsinki Senate Square attached to the ring.

From 2025 onwards, the host city handover is symbolised by a "friendship gift" from the preceding host city to its successor, which stays permanently in each city.

== Semi-final allocation drawing venue ==
Since the introduction of the two semi-finals system in 2008, a draw has been held to determine in which semi-final a country would participate, as well as in which semi-final a country would vote in. Each year, either five or six countries are exempt from the drawing for competing in the semi-finals: the "Big Five" (France, Germany, Italy, Spain, and the United Kingdom) and the host country, if the host is not one of the "Big Five". In 2015, the number of countries exempt was seven, as Australia joined the other six exempt countries as a special guest contestant.

Regardless if a country is exempt from competing in the semi-finals, all participating countries are allotted a semi-final in which to vote.

Year	Venue	City	Ref.
2008	Old Palace	Belgrade	
2009	Marriott Royal Aurora Hotel	Moscow	
2010	Smuget	Oslo	
2011	Esprit Arena	Düsseldorf	
2012	Buta Palace	Baku	
2013	Malmö Town Hall	Malmö	
2014	Copenhagen City Hall	Copenhagen	
2015	Vienna City Hall	Vienna	
2016	Stockholm City Hall	Stockholm	
2017	Column Hall of Kyiv City State Administration	Kyiv	
2018	Lisbon City Hall	Lisbon	
2019	Tel Aviv Museum of Art	Tel Aviv	
2021 (Note: The semi-final allocation draw for the cancelled 2020 contest was eventually retained for the 2021 contest.)	Rotterdam City Hall	Rotterdam	
2022	Palazzo Madama	Turin	
2023	St George's Hall	Liverpool	
2024	Malmö Town Hall	Malmö	
2025	Kunstmuseum Basel	Basel	
2026	Vienna City Hall	Vienna	

== Running order drawing venue ==
Previously, the running order was determined at a dedicated event. This has been made redundant following the implementation of producer-created running orders in 2013.

Year	Venue	City	Ref.
1973	Villa Louvigny	Luxembourg City	
1988	Mansion House	Dublin	
1993	National Concert Hall	Dublin (Note: Contest held in Millstreet)	
1997	Clarence Hotel	Dublin	
2007	Finlandia Hall	Helsinki	
2008	Sava Centar	Belgrade	
2009	Cosmos Hotel	Moscow	
2012	Buta Palace	Baku	

== Receptions and opening ceremony venues ==
An official opening ceremony with a red carpet procession has been held since 2009 at a venue in the host city. Prior to that, a welcome reception was typically held for all participating artists and hosted by the mayor of the host city.

Table key

◇ Contest cancelled

Year	Venue	City	Ref.
1985	Kronhuset	Gothenburg	
1992	Malmö Town Hall	Malmö	
1993	Great Southern Hotel	Killarney	
1993	Cork City Hall	Cork	
1994	Dining Hall, Trinity College	Dublin	
1995	Royal Hospital Kilmainham	Dublin	
1996	Oslo City Hall	Oslo	
1998	International Convention Centre	Birmingham	
1999	Israel Museum	Jerusalem	
2004	Çırağan Palace	Istanbul	
2006	Zappeion	Athens	
2007	Finlandia Hall	Helsinki	
2008	Palace of Serbia	Belgrade	
2009	Central Manezh Exhibition Center	Moscow	
2010	Oslo City Hall	Oslo	
2011	Tonhalle Düsseldorf	Düsseldorf	
2012	Baku Sports Palace	Baku	
2013	Malmö Opera	Malmö	
2014	Copenhagen City Hall	Copenhagen	
2015	Rathausplatz and Vienna City Hall	Vienna	
2016	Stockholm City Hall	Stockholm	
2017	Mariinskyi Palace and Parkovy Congress and Exhibition Center	Kyiv	
2018	Museum of Art, Architecture and Technology and Electricity Museum	Lisbon	
2019	Habima Square and Charles Bronfman Auditorium	Tel Aviv	
2020	Rotterdam Cruise Terminal ◇	Rotterdam ◇	
2021	Rotterdam Cruise Terminal	Rotterdam	
2022	Palace of Venaria	Turin	
2023	Walker Art Gallery and St George's Hall	Liverpool	
2024	Malmö Live	Malmö	
2025	Basel Town Hall, Middle Bridge, and Congress Center Basel	Basel	
2026	Rathausplatz, Burgtheater, and Vienna City Hall	Vienna	

== See also ==
- List of Junior Eurovision Song Contest host cities
