= Luc Courchesne =

Canadian artist and academic

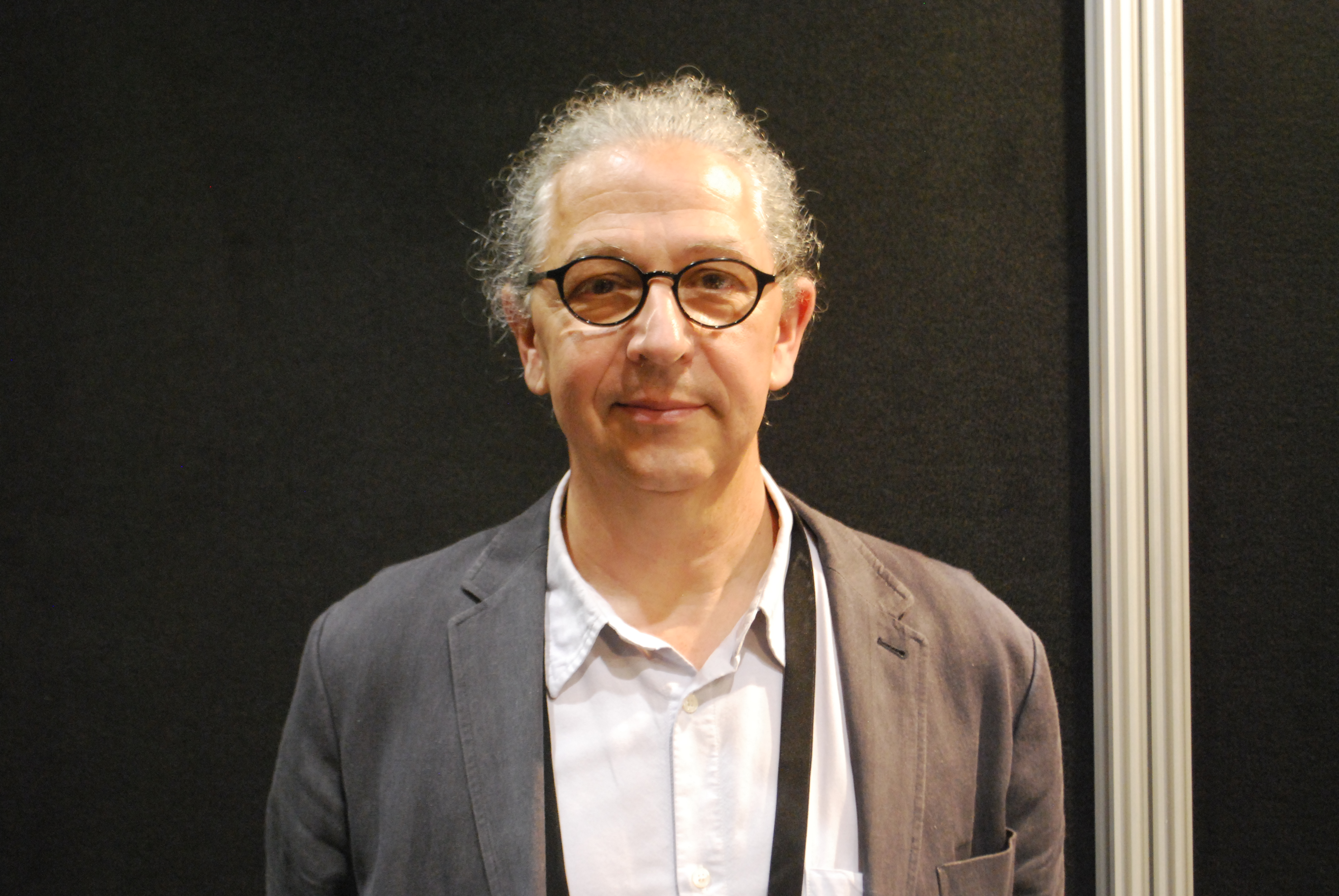
- Born: May 20, 1952 (age 74); Saint-Léonard-d'Aston, Quebec
- Occupations: artist, professor
- Notable work: Portrait One, Family Portrait
- Website: courchel.net

Luc Courchesne RCA D.F.A. (1952) is a Canadian artist and academic known for his work in interactive art.

== Life ==
Luc Courchesne was born May 20, 1952, in Saint-Léonard-d'Aston, Quebec. He received a bachelor's degree in design from the Nova Scotia College of Art and Design in 1974. In the 1980s, he received a Master of Science degree in visual studies from the Massachusetts Institute of Technology. Courchesne was a member of the MIT Media Lab at its inception in 1985.

Courchesne was a professor of industrial design at the Université de Montréal.

== Work ==
Courchesne is known for his interactive video installations and environments. He began working in interactive video in 1984 when he co-authored Elastic Movies, and since has produced many installation works and image series. In his early works such as Family Portrait and Portrait One (1989), the viewer interacts with the a human image programmed to engage in a lifelike conversation with the viewer. His later work Landscape One (1997) surrounds the viewer with a 360 degree immersive and interactive video projection of a park.

In 1994, he exhibited his work in a solo show at the Museum of Modern Art in New York titled Project 47: Luc Courchesne. and has had numerous later solo and group shows, both nationally and internationally. In 2022, Luc Courchesne - Observateur du monde, an exhibition, was shown at the Carrefour des Arts, Université de Montréal. He is represented by Pierre-François Ouellette art contemporain (PFOAC), a contemporary art gallery in Montreal, Quebec.

On September 11, 2001, while he was on assignment in New York City for a "Québec–New York" cultural event, Courchesne happened to be videotaping the smoldering North Tower of the World Trade Center as the second plane hit the South Tower. The 23-minute video of his experience was made available at CBC/Radio-Canada's archives.

Courchesne has been awarded several artist-in-residence positions internationally. Since 1996, he has been a member of the Society for Arts and Technology in Montreal. He was Chairman of the Board of Directors from 1996 to 2005, then Vice-Chairman from 2005 to 2008.

== Collections ==
Courchesne's work is included in the permanent collection of the National Gallery of Canada, Musée national des beaux-arts du Québec and elsewhere as well as in many institutions internationally such as the Zentrum für Kunst und Medientechnologie (ZKM) in Karlsruhe.

== Awards ==
- 1997 - his installation Paysage no. 1 won the Grand Prize of the first biennale of the NTT InterCommunication Center in Tokyo.
- 1999 - honorary mention in the category of "Interactive Art" of the Prix Ars Electronica in Linz.
- 2010 - member of the RCA by way of their nomination process.
- 2019 - received the Prix Paul-Émile Borduas, Quebec's highest award in visual arts.
- 2021 - Governor General's Award in Visual and Media Arts.
- 2022 - awarded an honorary doctorate from NSCAD.

== See also ==
- Digital art
- Université de Montréal
