= Le Feuvre & Roze =

- Location: Paris, France
- Coordinates: 48.8757°N 2.3002°E
- Type: Art gallery
- Founder: Franck Le Feuvre
- Director: Jonathan Roze
- Website: lefeuvreroze.com

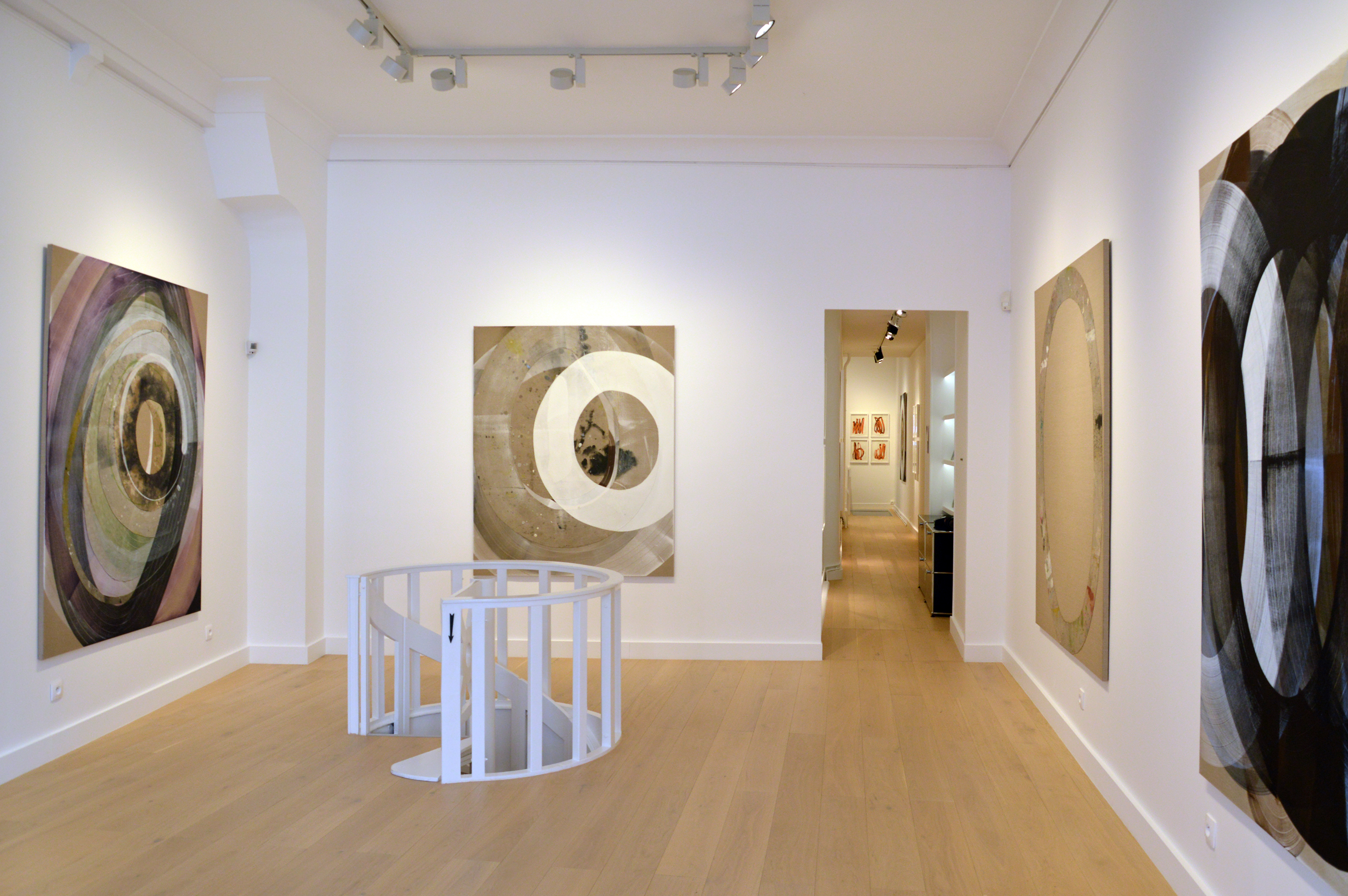
Exhibition of artist Adrian Faulkner in the gallery.

Le Feuvre & Roze is a contemporary art gallery in Paris. It represents a significant number of artists of different nationalities in France.

== History ==
The gallery was founded by Franck Le Feuvre as "Le Feuvre Gallery". In 2016, Jonathan Roze became its director, and in 2018, Roze became a partner in the enterprise, with the accompanying name change to "Le Feuvre & Roze". The gallery has a second showroom at 178 Rue du Faubourg Saint-Honoré.

== Associated artists and collaborations ==
The current artists represented by the gallery:

- Adrian Falkner
- Ella et Pitr
- Jan Kolata
- Mist
- Sixe Paredes
- Sowat
- Christoph Häßler (Stohead)
- Julien Colombier

== Exhibitions ==
Since 2005, the gallery has regularly displayed individual and collective exhibitions of its clients, such as four JonOne exhibitions between 2008 - 2016 and also two exhibitions of Invader: 1000 in 2011 and Masterpieces in 2017.

All of the associated artists have an individual exhibition every two or three years.

Recent exhibitions: Adrian Falkner: Cold Fever, 2018; Jan Kolata : Grands Formats, 2018; and Ella & Pitr : Comme des fourmis. 2018;
