= Ed Pien =

Canadian artist (born 1958)

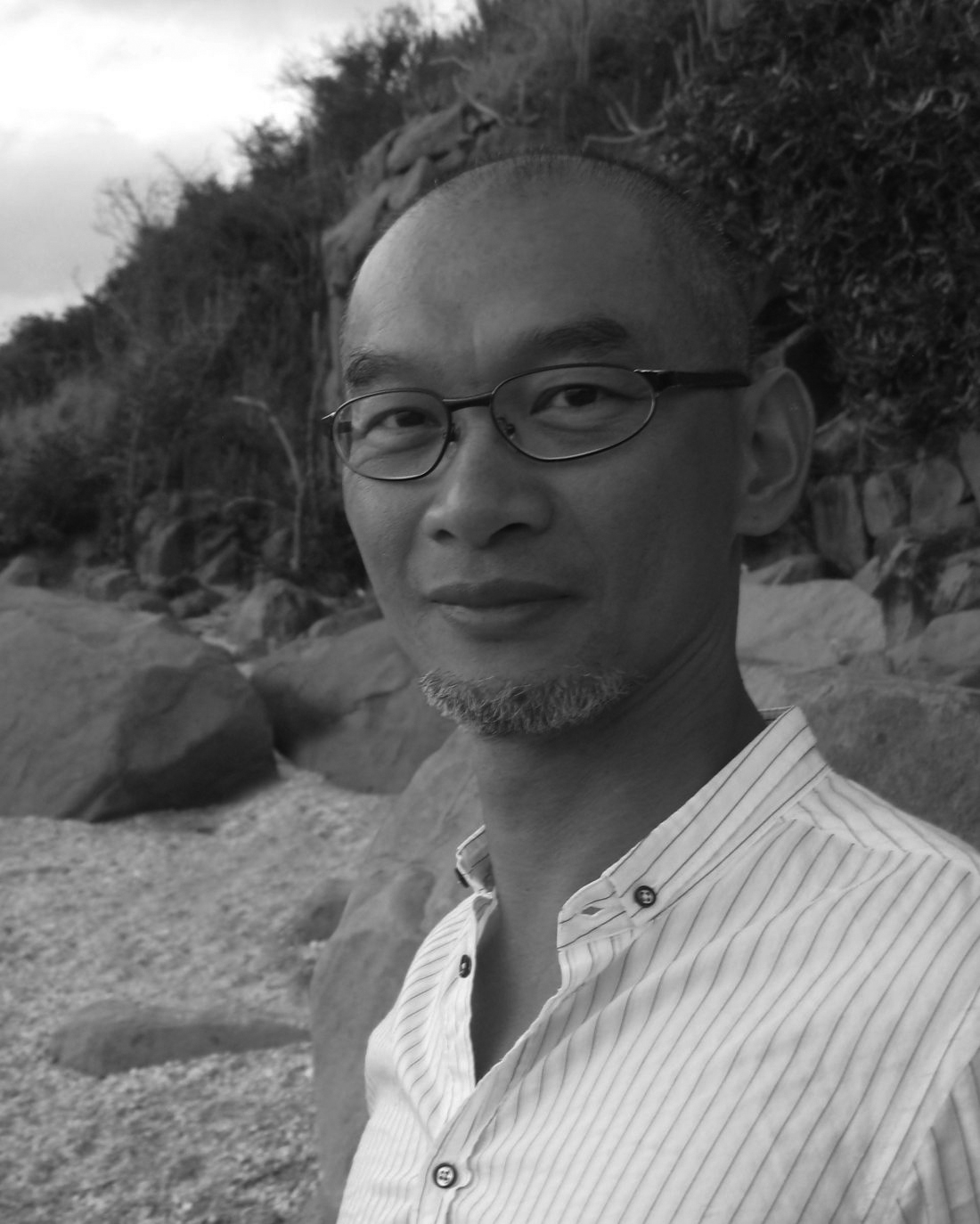
- Born: February 23, 1958 (age 68); Taipei, Taiwan
- Education: BFA, University of Western Ontario (1982); MFA, York University (1984)

Ed Pien (born February 23, 1958) is a Canadian contemporary artist, known for his drawings and large-scale drawing-based installations inspired by multiple sources (Inuit as well as European and Chinese) and traditions, printmaking, paper cuts and video and photography.

== Life ==
Pien was born in 1958 in Taipei, Taiwan, emigrating to Canada at the age of 11 with his family. At a young age, he began to draw and feels drawing propels everything he does. He received a Bachelor of Fine Arts from the University of Western Ontario (1982) and a Master of Fine Arts from York University (1984).

Pien lives and works in Toronto, where he was a professor in the John H. Daniels Faculty of Architecture, Landscape and Design at the University of Toronto. He has also been an Artist-in-Residence, Painting and Drawing, Studio Arts at Concordia University, Montreal.

== Career ==
Pien's practice is drawing-based. For his cut-outs, he uses an X-Acto knife as his drawing tool and traditional Japanese paper, or he constructs maze-like spaces using walls of crinkly paper grounds with drawings on them and through these large-scale installations he fashions a conduit into feeling and thought. He also is a photographer. In 2019, the Glenbow Museum (Calgary) held an exhibition titled Ed Pien: Our Beloved of 144 framed photographs of flowers hung together in a monumental, wall-filling installation to commemorate decorated gravesites at a cemetery in Santiago, Chile which is the final resting place for many political dissidents and victims of the reign of Augusto Pinochet between 1973 and 1990. Also in 2019, he made a ghostly new print at NSCAD in collaboration, as he said, with the Atlantic Ocean. In 2020, to bear witness to the disruptions and unease brought on by the pandemic, he concentrated on making his Invasive Species, series of green-coloured drawings inspired by decorative Chinoiserie patterns as well as carefully observed plants and insects thriving in his own garden.

His work has been exhibited extensively throughout Canada and internationally, including, among others, at the Drawing Centre (New York), the Victoria & Albert Museum, London; The Canadian Culture Centre in Paris; Contemporary Art Gallery (Vancouver), the Robert McLaughlin Gallery (Oshawa) partnering with the Southern Alberta Art Gallery and Cambridge Galleries, The Contemporary Art Museum (Monterrey, Mexico), The Goethe Institute (Berlin), the 18th Edition of the Sydney Biennale and the 5th edition of the Moscow Biennale. The Corridor of Rain was featured at the Curitiba Biennial, in Brazil in 2018. In 2022, he showed Present: Past/Future at the Art Gallery of Ontario, a multisensory environment, which captured moments and memories of elders in Havana, Cuba which he had collected since 2014. It marked a change in his work into documentary film and portrait photography. Pien's work is represented by Pierre-François Ouellette art contemporain (PFOAC), a contemporary art gallery in Montreal, Quebec.

== Selected public collections ==
Pien's work is held internationally in the collections of over twenty-five museums, including the National Gallery of Canada, the Art Gallery of Ontario, the Montreal Museum of Fine Arts, the Centrum Beeldende Kunst (the Netherlands), Museo de Arte y Diseno Contemporaneo (Costa Rica) and the Ordos Art Museum (Mongolia, China).

== Publications ==
- Pien, Ed; Beaudry, Eve-Lyne (2010). Ed Pien: l'antre des délices = haven of delight. Joliette, Québec: Musée d'art de Joliette.
