= Golnar Adili =

American artist (born 1976)

- گلنار عدیلی
- Born: 1976 (age 49–50); Falls Church, Virginia, U.S.
- Education: University of Virginia (BFA), University of Michigan (MA)
- Partner: Louis Wegner
- Children: 1
- Website: www.golnaradili.com

Golnar Adili (Persian: گلنار عدیلی; born 1976) is an American-born Iranian multidisciplinary visual artist, based in Brooklyn, New York. Much of her work is influenced by growing up in post-Iranian Revolution in Tehran and issues of displacement.

== Biography ==
Golnar Adili was born in 1976, in Falls Church, Virginia, but by 1980 at the age four her family moved back to Iran. Her parents were political activists and after their move to Iran, her father was forced to flee back to the United States.

She returned to the United States in 1994 to reunite with her father and pursue her college education. In 1998 she received a Bachelor of Fine Arts degree in painting from the University of Virginia in Charlottesville, and in 2006 she received a Master's degree in Architecture from University of Michigan in Ann Arbor.

Her partner is Louis Wegner, and they have one daughter.

In 2009, she won a Fellowship in printmaking/drawing/artists books from New York Foundation for the Arts. Adili has been awarded residencies at Women's Studio Workshop (2015), The MacDowell Colony (2007, 2013), the Rockefeller Foundation at the Bellagio Center, and the Lower East Side Printshop (2014), among others.

== Exhibitions ==
A list of select exhibitions by Adili, in order by year.

=== Solo and two-person exhibitions ===
- 2011 – Forged Patterning: Solo Show, Aun Gallery, Tehran, Iran
- 2012 – I Wish One Could Measure the Emotions of Others: A Solo Show, Hudson D. Walker Gallery at the Fine Arts Work Center, Provincetown, Massachusetts
- 2014 – Displacement, Craft and Folk Art Museum (now Craft Contemporary), Los Angeles, California; two-person exhibition with Samira Yamin
- 2026 – Dust of Sorrow (Ghobar é Gham), Walters Art Museum, Baltimore, Maryland

=== Group exhibitions ===
- 2013 – Art on Paper + 1, Brussels Contemporary Drawing Fair, Galeri Coullaud and Koulinsky, Paris, France
- 2012 – Beached: An Exhibition of the 2011–2012 Visual Arts Fellows, Fine Arts Work Center, Provincetown, Massachusetts
- 2014 – Good News From Iran, Pasinger Fabrik-Munich, Munich, Germany
- 2016 – Language Landscape, Kentler International Drawing Space, Brooklyn, New York
- 2016 – Contemporary Women Artists From Iran, Edward Hopper House Art Center, 82 North Broadway, Nyack, New York; three-person exhibition with Roya Farassat and Shabnam K. Ghazi
- 2023 – Women Making Books, Albert and Shirley Small Collections Library, University of Virginia, Charlottesville, Virginia

== See also ==
- List of Iranian women artists
- Iranian modern and contemporary art
