= Meryl McMaster =

Canadian and Plains Cree photographer (born 1988)

- Born: 1988 (age 37–38)
- Education: Ontario College of Art and Design University
- Known for: Photographer
- Notable work: Time's Gravity, 2015
- Website: www.merylmcmaster.com

Meryl McMaster (born 1988) is a Canadian and Plains Cree photographer whose best-known work explores her Indigenous heritage, often using portraiture to explore cultural identity.

== Early life and education ==
Meryl McMaster was born in 1988, Ottawa, Ontario, Canada. She is a Cree woman of the Siksika Nation.

She studied photography at the Ontario College of Art and Design University, graduating in 2010.

== Work ==
McMaster frequently practices self-portraiture and portraiture to explore themes of First Nations peoples and cultural identity, and incorporates elements of performance and installation to preserve her mixed heritage and sites of cultural history in the Canadian landscape.

In her work, McMaster explores "tensions surrounding understanding one's personal identity and heritage, especially her own as a woman of Indigenous (Plains Cree) and European (British/Dutch) descent." She adopts a performative approach in which she blurs the boundaries between performance, sculpture, and photography by incorporating elaborate costumes and props in order to create staged images. McMaster considers these elements to be tools of personal transformation that become extensions of her body. McMaster's first major series, Ancestral, from 2008, "appropriates ethnographic portraits, which she then projects onto her photographic subjects: herself and her father," noted artist and curator Gerald McMaster.

She makes use of such elaborate props in works such as Winged Callings (animal costumes) or Aphoristic Currents (collar "fashioned out of hundreds of twisted newspapers") in order to examine the tensions between cultural and personal memory as well as how they interact with imagination. Both works are part of her In-Between Worlds series (2010–2013). With regards to her artistic practice, McMaster states: "I'm really interested in exploring questions of our sense of self and how we really come to construct that sense of self through land and lineage, history and culture". She continues to examine identity, colonialism, and the environment in her large-scale works. Her work is represented by Pierre-François Ouellette art contemporain (PFOAC), a contemporary art gallery in Montreal, Quebec, and Stephen Bulger Gallery in Toronto, Ontario.

== Recognition and awards ==
In 2010, McMaster won the Canon Canada Prize, the Ontario College of Art and Design Medal in Photography as well as the Spoke Club Membership Prize and the Vistek Photography Award.

In 2013, she was a recipient of the Eiteljorg Contemporary Art Fellowship and, in 2016, she was longlisted for the Sobey Art Award. In 2017, she was awarded the REVEAL Indigenous Art Award.

In 2018, she was one of the three winners of the Scotia Bank New Generation Photography Award In March 2018, she was named one of three inaugural winners of the New Generation Photography Award, which supports the careers of young artists working in lens-based media.

Other distinctions she received include the Charles Pachter Prize for Emerging Artists, and the Doris McCarthy Scholarship.

== Exhibitions ==
McMaster's first solo exhibition, In-Between Worlds, opened at Project Space, Harbourfront Centre, in 2010 before traveling to the Station Gallery, the Peterborough Art Gallery, the Art Gallery of Hamilton's Design Annex, and the Montreal Museum of Fine Arts until 2017. By 2015, McMaster had exhibited in more than forty group shows in Canada, the United States, and Italy. A survey of her work was organized by the Carleton University Art Gallery (CUAG) and curated by Heather Anderson. The exhibition was on view at CUAG from May 2 - August 28, 2016 and subsequently travelled to other venues including the Doris McCarthy Gallery, the Richmond Art Gallery (RAG), the Thunder Bay Art Gallery, the Art Gallery of Southwestern Manitoba, the Lethbridge University Art Gallery, and The Rooms. Her work was prominently featured in Every. Now. Then: Reframing Nationhood at the Art Gallery of Ontario during the summer of 2017.

=== Group exhibitions ===
- Spirit in the Land, Pérez Art Museum Miami, 2024; and Nasher Museum of Art at Duke University, 2023
- Native Portraiture: Power and Perception, Tacoma Art Museum, February 10, 2018- February 10, 2019
- Niigaanikwewag, Art Gallery of Mississauga, February 22 - April 15, 2018
- Recover All That Is Ours, Campbell River Art Gallery, March 1 - April 25, 2018
- ÀDISÒKÀMAGAN/NOUS CONNAÎTRE UN PEU NOUS-MÊMES/ WE’LL ALL BECOME STORIES, Ottawa Art Gallery, April 28 - September 16, 2018
- Embodiment, Museum London, December 23, 2017 - April 1, 2018
- New Generation Photography Award Exhibition, National Gallery of Canada and Onsite Gallery, 2018
- Every. Now. Then: Reframing Nationhood, Art Gallery of Ontario, summer 2017
- The Sublunary World, Baldwin Gallery, 2017
- My Spirit Is Strong, Indigenous and Northern Affairs Canada Art Gallery, 2016
- Back Where They Came From, Sherry Leedy Contemporary Art, 2016
- Fifth World, Mendel Art Gallery, 2015
- Identity (Material Self: Performing the Other Within), MOCCA Toronto, part of CONTACT Photography Festival, 2014
- In the Flesh, Ottawa Art Gallery, 2013
- 1812–2012: A Contemporary Perspective, Harbourfront Centre, 2012

=== Solo exhibitions ===
- Confluence, University of Lethbridge Art Gallery, January 18 - March 15, 2018 [touring exhibition]
- In Between Worlds, Montreal Museum of Fine Arts, September 8 - December 3, 2017 [touring exhibition]
- The Fifth World, Mendel Art Gallery, April 3 - June 7, 2015
- Second Self, Latcham Gallery, 2011

== Collections ==
McMaster's work has been acquired by various public collections within Canada and the United States, including the Canadian Museum of History, the Art Gallery of Ontario, the Canada Council Art Bank, the Eiteljorg Museum, the National Museum of the American Indian, the Ottawa Art Gallery, the Nelson-Atkins Museum of Art and the Art Gallery of Greater Victoria as well as by Indigenous and Northern Affairs Canada.
