= Volta (art fair) =

International contemporary art fair

VOLTA
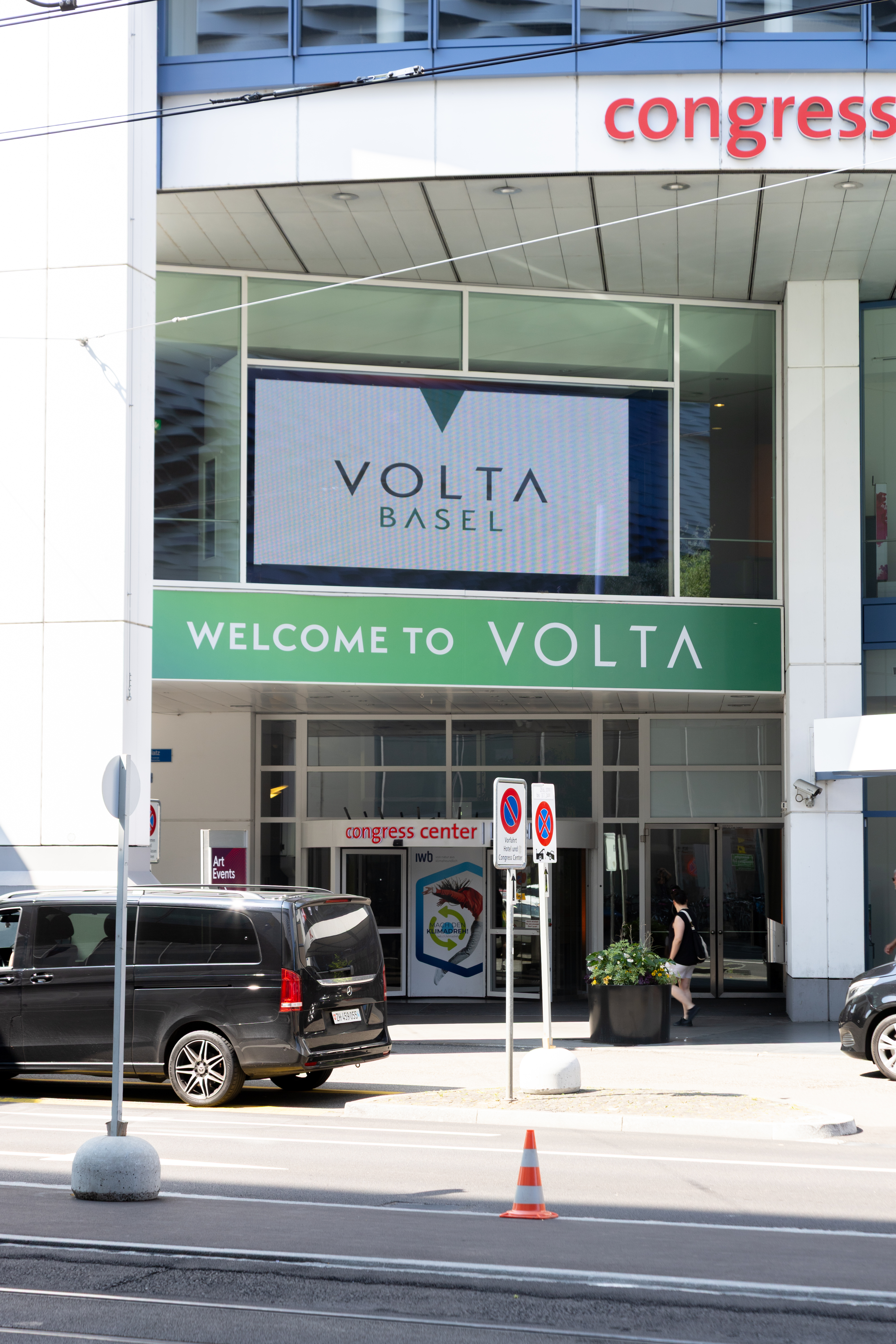
- Volta Basel at the Congress Center Basel in 2025
- Industry: Art
- Founded: 2006; 19 years ago in Basel, Switzerland
- Number of locations: 2 art fairs (Basel, Switzerland and New York City, New York)
- Products: Art fairs

Volta (stylized in all caps) is an international contemporary art fair. It has run both in Basel, Switzerland, as well as New York City. In the years when it has been hosted in Basel, it is considered one of the biggest satellite art fairs running concurrently with Art Basel. Lee Cavaliere has led its artistic direction since 2023.

== History ==
Volta was founded in 2005 by several gallerists to be a more casual contemporary arts space with a "kind of collegiate, collaborative, creative energy" in mind, as well as a specific attention paid to emerging talent.

In 2008, Volta was moved to New York City. In 2019, Volta in New York was canceled because of problems involving Pier 92 in Manhattan. The same year, Volta was acquired by Ramsay Fairs. In the following year, Volta was moved to Metropolitan West.

In 2021, Volta planned to launch a new art fair location in Miami. However, it was called off two months before its launch due to complications in organizing, as well as the COVID-19 pandemic.

In 2023, Volta returned to Basel in a new venue, Klybeck 610 in Klybeckplatz, but still had a New York showing. In 2024, Volta in New York hosted a pavilion of Ukrainian artists, while Cavaliere tapped a new board to tackle a reimagination of Volta in Basel.

In 2025, coinciding with its twentieth anniversary, showed at the Messeplatz in its founding city of Basel where it could accommodate 70 exhibitions, up from 47 the previous year. Located in the Congress Center Basel, it featured a pavilion of work from Middle East and North Africa artists, as well as a corridor for Swiss galleries. It also hosted Engage + Emerge talks to highlight discussions by underrepresented artists.
