= Geoffrey Farmer =

Canadian artist (born 1967)

- Born: 1967 (age 58–59); Vancouver, British Columbia, Canada
- Education: San Francisco Art Institute, San Francisco, USA (1991); Emily Carr University, Vancouver (1992)

Geoffrey Farmer (born 1967) is best known for extensive multimedia installations made of cut-out images which form collages.

== Early career ==
Farmer was born at St. Paul's Hospital in Vancouver, British Columbia, in 1967 and grew up in the Dundarave neighbourhood of West Vancouver, British Columbia. His career as an artist was unplanned, but he attended an art class with his sister when he was 21 and became interested. He received his art training at the San Francisco Art Institute (1991–1992) and Emily Carr University (1993).

== Art practice ==
Geoffrey Farmer creates installation-based artworks to create intersections of personal and lived experiences. He uses a combination of a broad range of elements, including: drawing, photography, video, sculpture, performance, found materials, and sometimes sound, bronze casting and waterworks. His work offers a subtle take on the legacies of minimalist and postminimalist art. Minimalism emphasized the artwork's ability to instill in the viewer a powerful sense of their own presence; Farmer's work begins with this idea of the art gallery as a site of phenomenological experience. Postminimalism represents a refinement of minimalism in the way it emphasizes the role the gallery context plays in creating the meaning of an artwork. Farmer adds to both traditions by focusing on the nature of meaning itself, emphasizing its fragility. He devises ways of fostering engagement with his work. Whereas minimalist artists, such as Donald Judd and Dan Flavin, were said by art critic Michael Fried to theatricalize the gallery-going experience, Farmer uses the idioms of theatre and performance as analogies of the process of meaning. This places him within the international trend, in which "installation art is a theatrical set without a stage play to give it meaning." For instance, Farmer's piece Hunchback Kit (2000-7 at the Tate uses a hard shell case with custom foam insert to house props for staging performances of The Hunchback of Notre Dame.

Farmer creates the art exhibition as a set of components made available for the viewer's interpretation. In this process, he casts himself in the role of the 'artist', continuing to add to and transform an exhibition during the time it is on view. In For Every Jetliner Used in an Artwork… (2006), for instance, Farmer presented a video in the exhibition of himself working to alter an installation during the night while the show is closed. By explicitly portraying the exhibition as being 'in process', Farmer ensures that "a degree of openness and instability is built in to his work." According to Mark Clintberg writing in The Drawing Room, London for Canadian Art International Farmer's work The Last Two Million Years (2007), takes the ephemerality of time as its theme, making small delicate sculptures from the pages of an Encyclopedia. Creating hybrid figurative objects out of disparate historical time periods, Farmer undoes the fixity of museum display and the agreed sequence of historical events.

In A Way Out of the Mirror (2017), he added bronze casting and waterworks to the list of materials he uses and transformed the site into an open-air stage.

== Work ==
His first figurative work was Trailer (2002), a large reproduction of a transport truck’s trailer, part reality (dirt covers the surface, and mud is splattered across the gas tank) and part artifice (the trailer looks like a movie prop). He followed this with many figurative works such as The Last Two Million Years (2007), The Idea and the Absence of the Idea (2008), The Surgeon and the Photographer (2009) (Vancouver Art Gallery), made of 365 three-dimensional collages, and Leaves of Grass (2012) (National Gallery of Canada), an installation 124 feet long, of more than 15,000 images cut from 50 years of Life magazine, arranged chronologically on stalks of dried grass. He viewed The Surgeon and the Photographer, along with The Last Two Million Years (2007) and Leaves of Grass (2012) as a trilogy of installations, based on the accumulation of images.

== Exhibitions ==
Farmer's first group exhibition took place in 1995 in Mexico. His first solo exhibition took place in Vancouver at Or Gallery. Since then, his exhibition history has been extensive, with shows nationally, and abroad. For dOCUMENTA (13) in 2012, Farmer produced Leaves of Grass. In 2015, he had a large mid-career retrospective co-curated by himself and Daina Augaitis at the Vancouver Art Gallery in which he used items from the Gallery’s artist archives to create installations that filled the entire gallery space. The exhibition was titled How Do I Fit This Ghost in My Mouth. In 2017, he represented Canada at the 57th Venice Biennale, in Venice with a show titled A Way Out of the Mirror. In 2017, he also had a show titled The Care With Which The Rain Is Wrong, at the Schinkel Pavillon, Berlin, Germany in which he used art monographs and his own digital library of illustrations and collection of sounds for his installations. In 2024, the exhibition Geoffrey Farmer: The Sound of Footsteps as Summer Walks Away was shown at the West Vancouver Art Museum. He is represented by Catriona Jeffries, Vancouver.

== Public art projects ==
- Every Letter in the Alphabet, Vancouver (2009) This was a year-long project commissioned for the 2010 Winter Olympics and Paralympics in Vancouver. Farmer's Every Letter in the Alphabet (2010) was located in a storefront space in the city. He commissioned twenty-six language-based works, one for every letter of the alphabet, including readings performances and poster projects to appear in the space, and throughout the city, during 2009–2010.

== Residencies ==
- Theatre of Erosion or I Hate Work That is Not a Play, lead faculty, The Banff Centre, Banff, Canada (2010)
- Kadist Art Foundation, Paris, France (2011)
- Below Another Sky, commissioned by the Scottish Print Network, Edinburgh Printmakers, Edinburgh, Scotland (2014)

== Awards ==
- Viva Award, Jack and Doris Shadbolt Foundation for the Visual Arts, Vancouver, Canada (2003)
- Victor Martyn Lynch-Staunton Award, Visual Arts, Canada Council for the Arts (2008)
- The Hnatshyn Foundation Visual Arts Award (2011)
- The Gershon Iskowitz Prize, Art Gallery of Ontario, Toronto, Canada (2013) for his outstanding contribution to the visual arts in Canada

Farmer lives and works on Kauai, Hawaii, USA

== Bibliography ==
- Scott, Kitty; Farmer, Geoffrey (2017). Geoffrey Farmer: a way out of the mirror = une issue à travers ce miroir. Ottawa and Milan: National Gallery of Canada and Mousse Publishing.
- Landry, Pierre; Morgan, Jessica; Watson, Scott (2008). Geffrey Farmer. Montreal: Musée d'art contemporain de Montréal / ABC Art Books.
- Geffrey Farmer. Rotterdam: Witte de With. 2008.
