= Marie-Jeanne Musiol =

Swiss–Canadian photographer

Marie-Jeanne Musiol (born 1950) is a Swiss-Canadian photographer. She was born in Winterthur, Switzerland.

Her work is included in the collections of the National Gallery of Canada, the Museum of Fine Arts Houston, the National Museum of Women in the Arts. and the Musée national des beaux-arts du Québec. Musiol's work is represented by Pierre-François Ouellette art contemporain (PFOAC), a contemporary art gallery in Montreal, Quebec.

== Biography ==
From the 1980s onwards, the artist explored the natural energy of plants using the Kirlian effect and a light-sensitive material such as negative film. She founded the Daïmôn art center in 1986. In 1994, she gained widespread public recognition with the series The Shadow of the Forest: photographs of trees that had grown from the ashes at Auschwitz.
