= Afarin Neyssari =

Iranian-American architect

- Occupations: Gallery owner, architect
- Known for: 2016 arrest and two-year imprisonment at Evin Prison
- Spouse: Karan Vafadari

Afarin Neyssari is an Iranian-American architect and the founder and owner of Aun Gallery. Neyssari and her husband Karan Vafadari, both Zoroastrians, were imprisoned in Evin Prison in Iran for two years without bail or trial before being released on July 21, 2018.

== Arrest and Detention ==
=== Arrest ===
Neyssari was arrested in Tehran's Imam Khomeini International Airport by Iran's Islamic Revolutionary Guard Corps (IRGC) on 20 July 2016 when she was boarding a plane to Italy to prepare for Bizhan Bassiri’s solo exhibition at the Venice Biennale festival. The exhibit was approved and certified by the Tehran Museum of Contemporary Art and the Minister of Culture. After putting them in handcuffs, IRGC officers began removing all works of art from the home. Many pieces were then taken outside and smashed.

In January 2018, Afarin tried to post bail. She was told that if the Judge wanted her released, he would not have set bail so high.

As a permanent US citizen, her release was disadvantaged by Trump's decision on the Iran Deal, as the lack of regular meetings between US and Iranian officials have been canceled. These meetings were the only face to face meetings the parties have, and the only opportunities for the release of the American prisoners.

=== Allegations of misconduct of the IRGC ===
==== Charges ====
Neyssari was arrested for unspecified activities that aroused suspicion in the IRGC. They have not released the charges made against Neyssari to the public, but there are many theories. Some have speculated the reason for her arrest being her frequent international traveling to collect art. It is speculated that she was only suspected due to being of the Zoroastrian faith: people of this monotheistic, pre-Islam faith have been highly persecuted since the 1979 revolution in Iran.

Though the couple was not mentioned by name, Tehran prosecutor Abbas Jafari Dolatabadi made a statement regarding two dual-citizens who have been detained in Iran for "organizing mixed-gender parties for foreign diplomats and their Iranian associates, as well as serving alcohol at their home". The couple has also been reportedly prosecuted for espionage.

==== Imprisonment ====
Neyssari was held for a full month in solitary confinement in Evin Prison with no charges or access to a lawyer. The IRGC demanded that Neyssari spy on her friends and husband. When she refused, she was sent back to solitary confinement. She was held for a further five months without charges or access to an attorney.

On December 31, 2016 she was given her first opportunity to meet a lawyer. The lawyer, Mahmoud Alizadeh Tabatabaee, was court-appointed, and not given a chance to defend Neyssari. The Judge assigned to her case is Abolghasem Salavati, who is the head of the 15th branch of the Islamic Revolutionary Court in Tehran.

Though they had previously decided not to take the case public, hoping to instead solve the issue with the IRGC interpersonally, Neyssari and husband's family decided to take the case publicly when they began receiving phone threats and demands for money.

==== Illegality of detainment ====
Her husband, an Iranian-American, has stated that he was the first Iranian to be convicted under Article 989 of the Civil Code of Iran. The article reads:

"In case any Iranian subject acquired foreign nationality after the solar year 1280 (1901-1902) without the observance of the provisions of law, his foreign nationality will be considered null and void and he will be regarded as an Iranian subject."

Any Iranian who renounces their Iranian citizenship and acquires citizenship elsewhere can still be processed in the court system of Iran as an Iranian citizen. They also may have their belongings taken and sold. In spite of neither Neyssari nor her husband never having revoked their citizenship in Iran, their cars, computers and documents have all been confiscated by the Iranian government on top of having been imprisoned.

== See also ==
- List of foreign nationals detained in Iran
