= Leila Zelli =

Iranian-Canadian artist (born 1981)

Leila Zelli (born 1981) is an Iranian-born Canadian multidisciplinary visual artist. She is known for her installation art.

Zelli was born in Tehran, and lives and works in Montreal, Quebec. In 2018, Zelli participated in the 36th International Symposium of Contemporary Art and was chosen "favorite artist" by the public. Zelli took part in the "Empreintes" residency at the Montreal Museum of Fine Arts in 2019. In 2021, Zelli received the Claudine and Stephen Bronfman Fellowship in Contemporary Arts. In 2023, she won the Lynne-Cohen prize from the Musée national des beaux-arts du Québec.

The artist's work is included in the collections of the Musée national des beaux-arts du Québec, Musée d’art contemporain de Montréal and the Musée des beaux-arts de Montréal. Her work is represented by Pierre-François Ouellette art contemporain (PFOAC), a contemporary art gallery in Montreal, Quebec.

== See also ==
- List of Iranian women artists
