= Mohammad Hossein Emad =

Iranian sculptor (born 1957)

- محمدحسین عماد
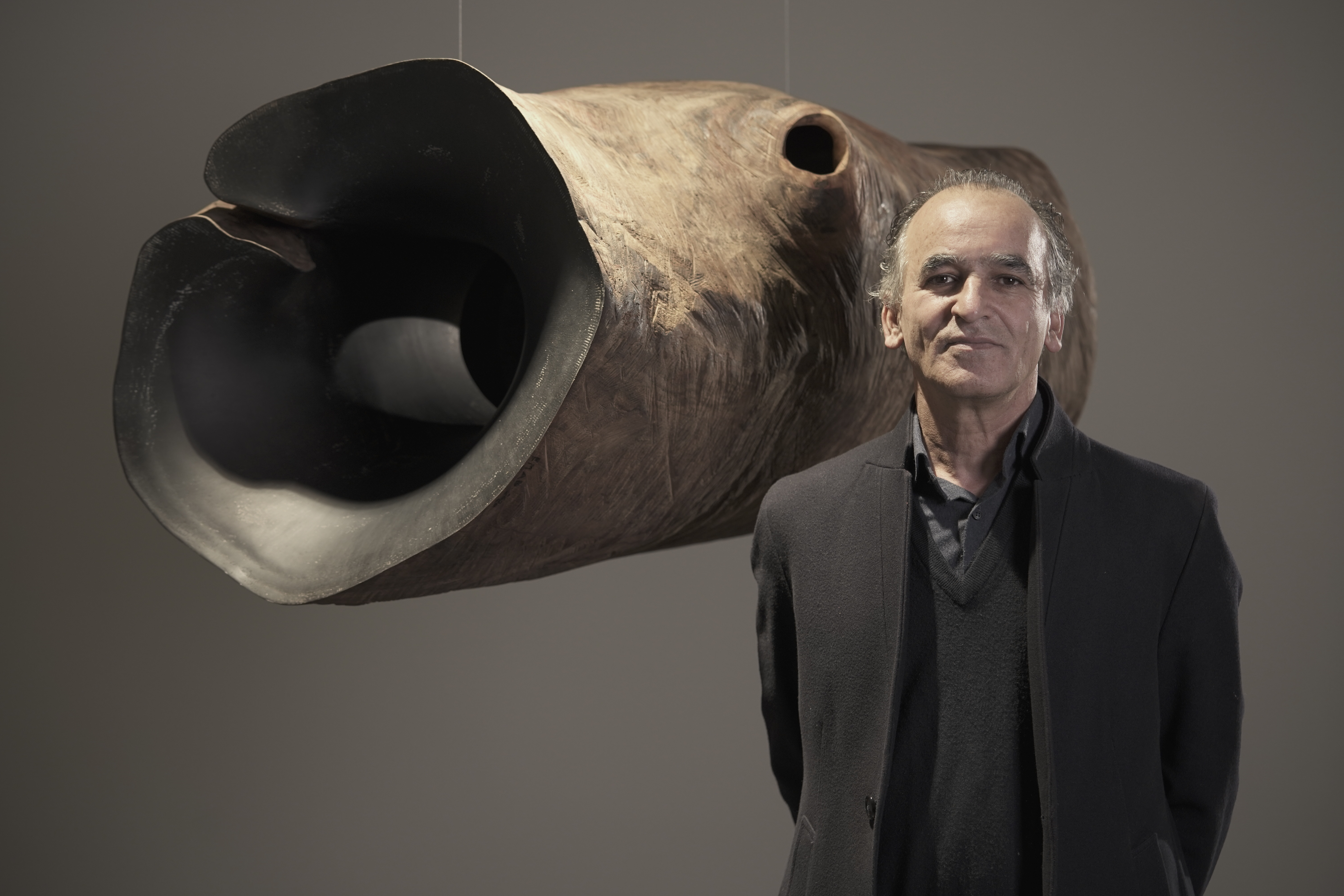
- Emad In his solo show at Ariana+ Gallery
- Born: 26 August 1957 (age 68); Arak, Pahlavi Iran (now Iran)
- Other name: Mohammad–Hossein Emad
- Occupations: Visual artist, educator
- Known for: Sculpture

Mohammad Hossein Emad (born 1957; Persian: محمدحسین عماد) is an Iranian contemporary sculptor and educator.

== Background ==
Emad was born on 26 August 1957 in Arak, Pahlavi Iran (now Iran). He lived in Arak until the age of 33, when he moved to the capital city of Tehran. He began being interested in painting at the age of five when he started copying images found in the magazines.

He began his artistic activities with experimental painting. He later began experimenting with sculpture and held his first exhibition at Tehran's Afrand Gallery in 1993.

In 2009, Assar Art Gallery published a book entitled Mohammad Hossein Emad's sculptures on the works of the artist.

== Public commissions ==
Emad has been commissioned for a series of urban projects. Among his urban sculptures are 'Vazir', situated in Tehran's Gofteman Park, and the Beheshti Monument situated in Shahid Beheshti University in Tehran, both commissioned in 2004. He has also made three sculptures for the Dr. Hesabi Centre in the cities of Tehran, Bushehr and Arak.

== Awards ==
- Honorary diploma from the fifth biennial of Iran's contemporary sculpture in 2007
- Selected as the sculptor of the year at Tehran's fourth contemporary sculpture biennial in 2005
- Winner of the first prize at 'Mirror of Art' exhibition at Tehran's Bahman Cultural Centre in 1996
