= August Klintberg =

Canadian artist

August Klintberg (formerly Mark Clintberg) a Canadian contemporary artist working in the domain of Art History. He has been a is an Alberta University of the Arts faculty member since in 2015 and is currently an associate professor, Liberal Studies. He graduated from Concordia University with a PhD in Art History in 2013 where his dissertation was nominated for the Governor-General's Gold Academic Medal.

His work is included in the collections of the National Gallery of Canada and the Alberta Foundation for the Arts. In 2013, he was shortlisted for the Sobey Art Awards. His work is represented by the Pierre François Ouellette art contemporain gallery in Montreal, Quebec.
