= Karan Vafadari =

Zoroastrian Iranian-American businessman

Karan Vafadari is a Zoroastrian Iranian-American businessman. He and his wife Afarin Neyssari were regulars in the Tehran art scene and owned Aun Gallery. They were arrested 2016 and placed in Evin Prison on charges of espionage, possession of alcohol, and "dealing in indecent art." They were released on bail in 2018 but, as of 2023, are still unable to leave Iran. He has three children who live in the United States.

== Arrest and detention ==
On 20 July 2016, Vafadari's wife Afarin Neyssari disappeared on her way out to Venice from Tehran's Imam Khomeini International Airport. When Vafadari arrived at the airport to investigate, he was promptly arrested by Iran's Islamic Revolutionary Guard Corps (IRGC), who had also just arrested Neyssari.

Vafadari was held for one month in solitary confinement in Evin Prison. Then, he was held an additional five months in a small cell without formal charges and without speaking to an attorney.

On December 31, 2016, Vafadari was notified of his charges, which further prevented him from going on bail. He selected a lawyer, but judge Abolqasem Salavati coerced Vafadari into dismissing the lawyer.

As a Zoroastrian, Karan could be another example in a history of confiscation of Zoroastrians' property.

Robert Toscano, former ambassador from Italy to Iran, refuted the authorities’ justification for their detention in an open letter, saying that “One has to be truly gullible and the easy victim of propaganda” to accept such charges. He continued, “The reason must be a different one…political blackmail toward the US (of which they are also citizens), envy for their success, intimidation toward the Zoroastrian community, desire to grab their properties, [and] repression of contemporary art.”

In January 2018, the judiciary indicated that it planned to use Article 989 of the Civil Penal Code against Karan. This law has not ever been used, and could have potentially serious consequences for Iran's economy and businesses.

In July 2018 both Karan and his wife were reportedly released on a $10 million bail pending an appeal.

== See also ==
- List of foreign nationals detained in Iran
