= Congress Center Basel =

Convention center in Switzerland

Coordinates: 47.5625°N 7.5991°E

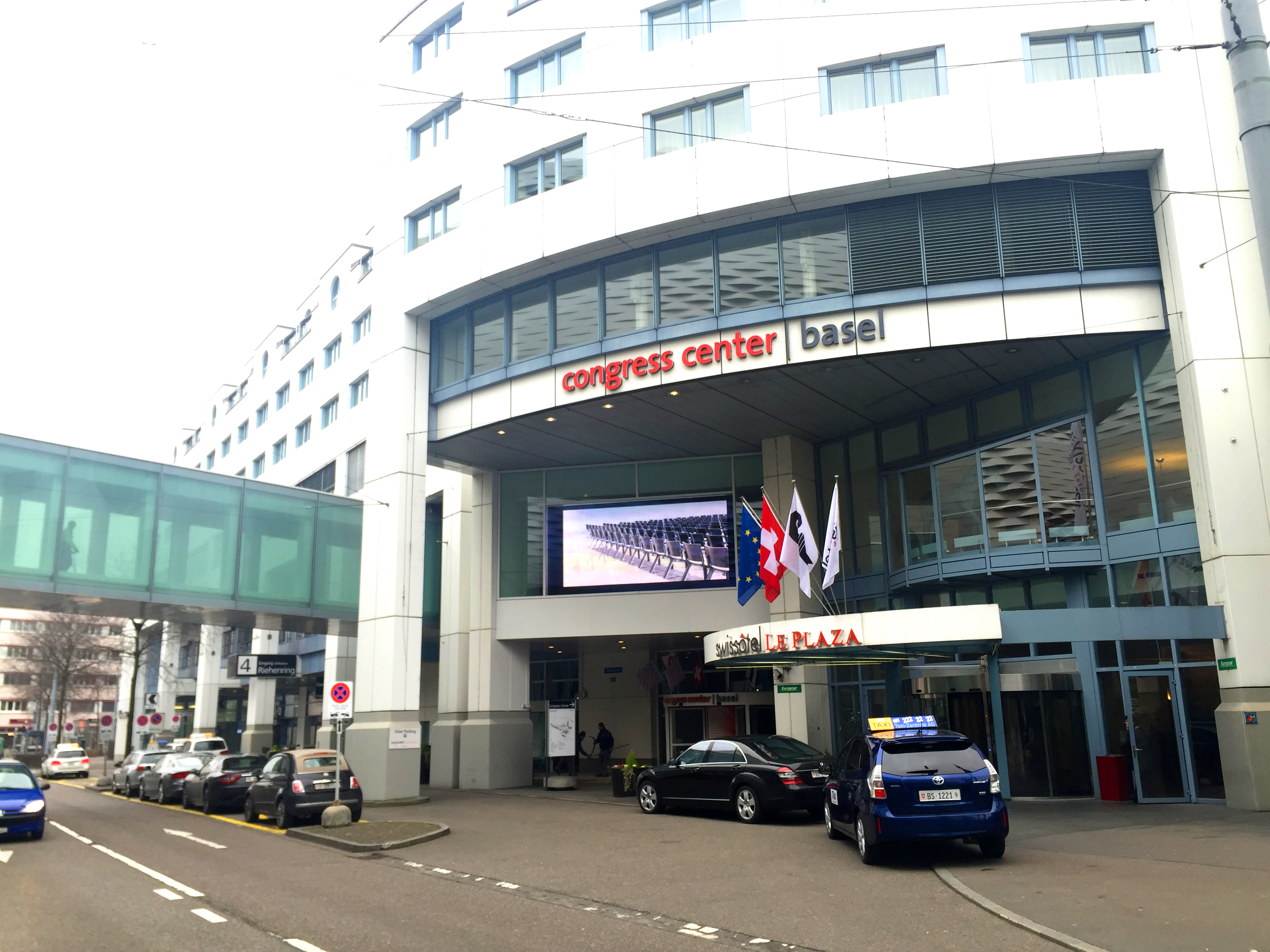
Congress Center Basel with connection to the Exhibition Center

The Congress Center Basel is Switzerland's biggest convention center. The venue belongs to the MCH Group, which operates exhibition centers in Basel, Zürich, and Lausanne, organizes exhibitions including Baselworld and Art Basel and offers live marketing services.

The Congress Center Basel is located downtown, next to Basel Exhibition Center (Messe Basel). The new Herzog & de Meuron building of Basel Exhibition Center is directly linked to the Congress Center Basel. The Congress Center's facilities include the multifunctional event hall on the ground floor of the new building.

On December 4 and 5, 2014, the 21st OSCE Ministerial Council was held at the Congress Center Basel, with delegations from the 57 OSCE member states traveling to Basel, and a total of some 2,000 participants in attendance.
