= Edward Hopper Birthplace and Boyhood Home =

Art center in New York

- U.S. National Register of Historic Places
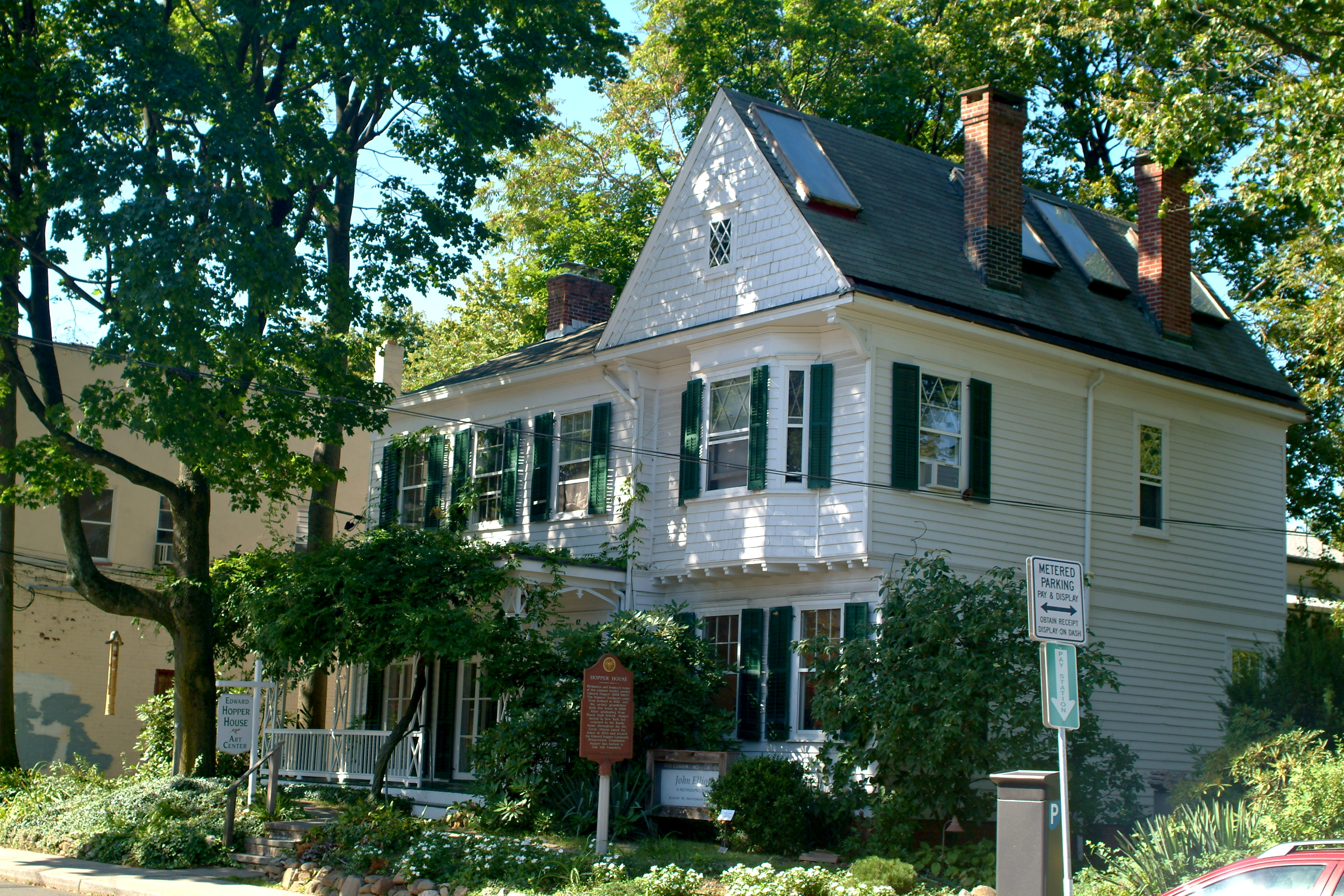
- Edward Hopper Birthplace and Boyhood Home, September 2008

- Location within New York Location within the United States
- Interactive map showing the location of Edward Hopper Birthplace and Boyhood Home
- Location: 82 North Broadway, Nyack, New York
- Coordinates: 41°5′35″N 73°55′6″W
- Area: less than one acre
- Built: 1882
- Architect: John Smith, artist's maternal grandfather.
- Architectural style: Queen Anne
- NRHP reference No.: 00000352
- Added to NRHP: April 6, 2000

Edward Hopper Birthplace and Boyhood Home, also known as the Edward Hopper House Art Center, is an art center and historic home located at 82 North Broadway, 3 1/2 blocks north of Main Street, Nyack in Rockland County, New York. It is a 2-story, side hall, mid-19th-century Greek Revival–style dwelling with a 2 1/2-story, Queen Anne–style addition. It was the home of noted artist Edward Hopper (1882–1967) from the time of his birth until he moved to Manhattan in 1910. He held title to the house until his death.

The house was built in 1858 by the artist's maternal grandfather, John Smith. The house served as Hopper's primary residence until 1910. After graduating from Nyack High School in 1899, Edward commuted to New York City, where he had enrolled at the New York School of Illustrating. He soon transferred to the New York School of Art.

It was listed on the National Register of Historic Places in 2000.

== Edward Hopper House Art Center ==
The house is now the Edward Hopper House Art Center, which features one gallery dedicated to Hopper's life and work, and other galleries for changing exhibits. The center also offers workshops, lectures, jazz concerts, figure drawing and other classes.

== See also ==
- Nyack, New York
