= Contemporary art gallery =

Art gallery showing contemporary art

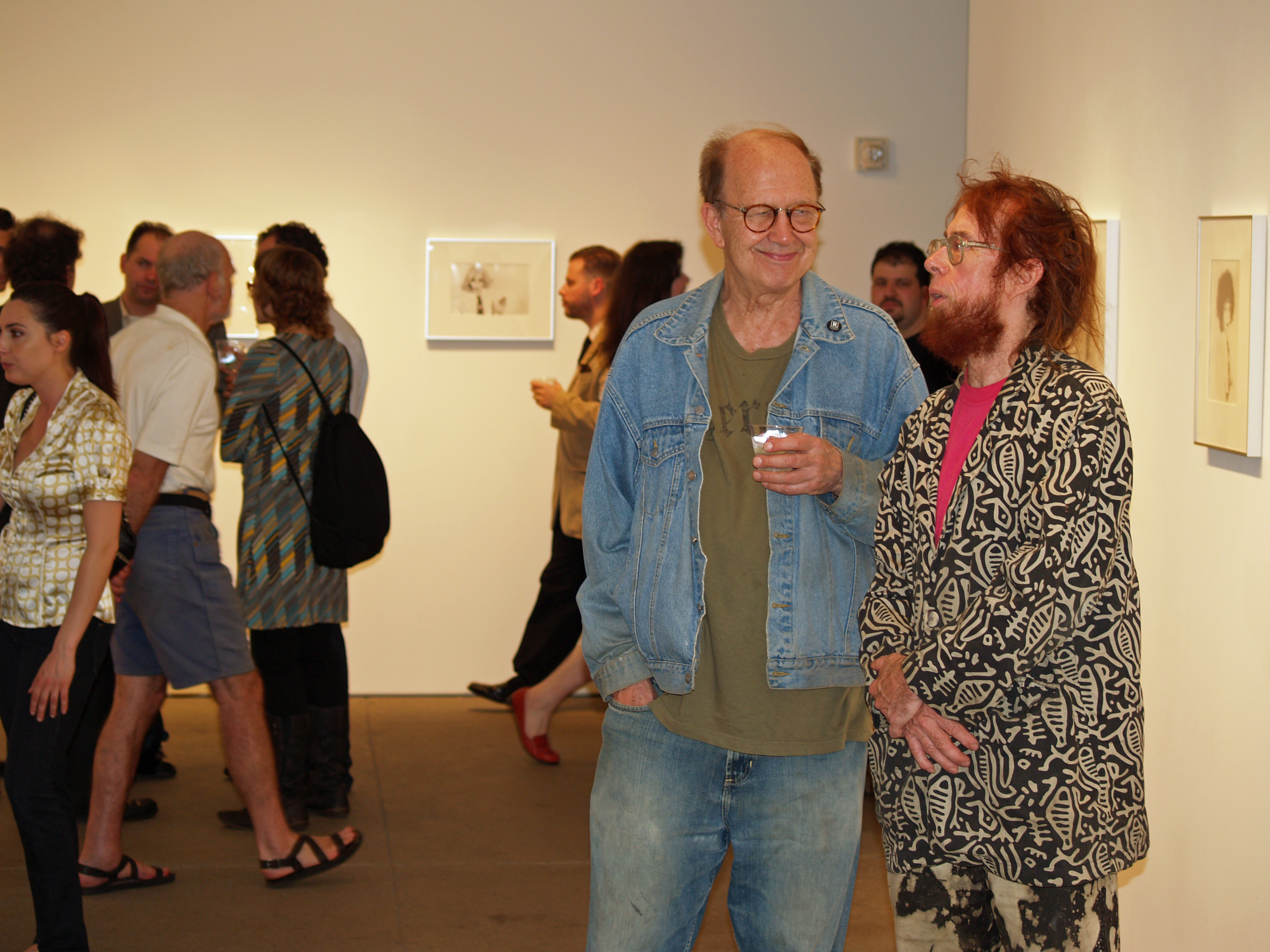
A gallery show opening in New York City

A contemporary art gallery is normally a commercial art gallery operated by an art dealer which specializes in displaying for sale contemporary art, usually new works of art by living artists. This approach has been called the "Castelli Method" after Leo Castelli, whose success was attributed to his active involvement in discovering and promoting emerging artists beginning in the late 1950s with Jasper Johns and Robert Rauschenberg.

== Galleries in the market for art ==
At the high end of the art market, a handful of elite auctioneers and dealers sell the work of celebrity artists; at the low end artists sell their work from their studio, or in informal venues such as restaurants. In the middle, art galleries are the primary connection between artists and collectors; accounting for the majority of transactions. Point-of-sale galleries connect artists with buyers by hosting exhibitions and openings. The artworks are on consignment, with the artist and the gallery splitting the proceeds from each sale. Depending upon the expertise of the gallery owner and staff, and the particular market, the artwork shown may be more innovative or more traditional in style and media.

=== Business models ===
There are many operational models that galleries follow. The most common business model is that of the for-profit, privately owned gallery. This is an extremely competitive market but one that may yield great profits. As a general rule, commercial galleries do not charge admission to the public, perhaps in a nod to the egalitarian philosophies of many artists and critics and to encourage attendance, or perhaps in the interests of just good business. Instead, they profit by taking a cut of the art's sales; the exact percentage varies. Some galleries in cities like Tokyo and in New York charge the artists a flat rate per day or per week, though this is considered distasteful in some international art markets. Inevitably the business of contemporary art has in recent decades become increasingly internationalized and commercialized.

Commercial galleries often choose to represent artists exclusively, giving them the opportunity to have solo shows regularly. They usually promote the artist's shows by cultivating collectors, making press contacts, and trying to get critical reviews. Most reputable galleries absorb the cost of printing invitations to the opening, guidebooks, and other P.R. publications. Some galleries self-publish or help to arrange publishing for art books and monographs concerning their artists. They sometimes provide a stipend or otherwise ensure the artist has enough money to make ends meet. One idiosyncrasy of contemporary art galleries is their aversion to signing business contracts, although this is changing due to artists taking more control of their output and saleability through professional practice information provided by artists' associations.

Large commercial art fairs where galleries and other dealers show their best artists and sell works over a period of a week or so have taken the art world by storm in recent years. The biggest of these is the Armory Show in New York (not to be confused with the famous show by the same name in 1913), which charges admission. These fairs have been criticized by artists as over-commercializing contemporary art.

There are also many not-for-profit, artist-run spaces and art-collective galleries which follow different business models, as well as vanity galleries which prey on unsavvy artists.

=== Exhibitions ===
Curators often create group shows that say something about contemporary issues or a certain theme, trend in art, or group of associated artists. Galleries often choose to represent artists exclusively, giving them the opportunity to show regularly. Some have a narrow focus while others are more eclectic.

Although primarily concerned with providing a space to show works of visual art, art galleries are sometimes used to host other artistic activities, such as music concerts, poetry readings, or performances, which may be considered performance art or theater.

The nature of some forms of postmodern art such as Land art, internet art, mail art and installation art prohibit gallery exhibition. Documentation of these kinds of art such as photographic records, are often shown and sold in galleries however, as are preliminary or process drawings and collages (such as those generated by Christo as part of the proposal to governing bodies when applying to install land works). British artist Richard Long manages to combine his core intentions by linking the materials used in his land art, to make gallery art. Andy Goldsworthy does so as well.

== Alternative galleries ==
Galleries run for the public good by cities, churches, art collectives, not-for-profit organizations, and local or national governments are usually termed Non-Profit Galleries. Galleries run by artists are sometimes known as Artist Run Initiatives, and may be temporary or otherwise different from the traditional gallery format.

== Art districts ==
Art galleries are often established together in urban centers such as the Chelsea district of New York, widely considered to be the center of the American contemporary art world. Most large urban areas have several art galleries, and most towns will be home to at least one. However, they may also be found in small communities, and remote areas where artists congregate, e.g. the Château de Montsoreau-Museum of Contemporary Art (Montsoreau) in France, the Chinati Foundation (Marfa) in United States, the Taos art colony (Taos) in New Mexico and St Ives, Cornwall; (Hill End), (Braidwood) and (Byron Bay) in New South Wales Contemporary art galleries are usually free and open to the public; however, some are semi-private, more exclusive, and by appointment only.

Galleries tend to cluster in certain neighborhoods within cosmopolitan cities for economic and practical reasons, mainly that it is possible for the buyers and general public to view more art if they can travel by foot. In the past galleries have tended to cluster in neighborhoods with affordable real-estate due to the unprofitable nature of the business. However, in the 21st century art galleries are strongly associated with the process of gentrification, and prime real estate for Chelsea galleries is not affordable for unprofitable galleries. Generally, cities that have less centralized art districts are faring poorly in terms of market share.

=== List of art districts by area name, city and country ===
==== United States ====
- Chelsea, 57th Street, Upper East Side and Madison Avenue, SoHo, Lower East Side, TriBeCa, and Dumbo, and Williamsburg, Brooklyn, New York City
- Gallery Row and The Arts District, Downtown Los Angeles, Los Angeles
- Roosevelt Row, Phoenix, Arizona
- Bergamot Station, Santa Monica, California
- River North Gallery District, Near North Side, Chicago
- West Loop, Chicago
- Greenwich, New Canaan, Norwalk, Westport, Fairfield County, Connecticut
- Miami Design District, Miami, Florida
- Wynwood Art District, Miami, Florida
- Worth Avenue, Palm Beach, Florida
- Downtown Arts and Museum District, The Railyard District and Canyon Road, Santa Fe, New Mexico
- Royal Street, New Orleans, Louisiana
- Downtown Arts District, Las Vegas, Nevada
- East End & West End, Commercial Street, Bradford Street, Provincetown, Massachusetts

==== United Kingdom ====
- Cork Street, Fitzrovia, Hoxton, Mayfair and Vyner Street in London, UK. Bartlett Street in Bath, UK

==== Australia ====
- Paddington, Woollahra Darlinghurst, Glebe and the Rocks, Sydney
- Bourke Street and Southbank Melbourne

==== China ====
- 798 Art Zone, Caochangdi and Feijiacun, Beijing, China
- m50 Art District, Shanghai, China

==== France ====
- The Marais, Paris
- Komunuma, Romainville
- Chevalier Roze, Marseille

==== Other ====
- Alserkal Avenue, the industrial compound hosting galleries such as Carbon 12 Dubai, located in Dubai industrial area of Al Quoz, in the UAE
- West Queen West, Distillery District, Yorkville, Grange Park Toronto, Canada.
- Insadong District, Seoul, Korea
- San Telmo, Buenos Aires, Argentina
- Jordaan, Amsterdam, the Netherlands
- Gillman Barracks, Singapore

== See also ==
- Art colony
- Art gallery
