= Bahram Beyzai bibliography =

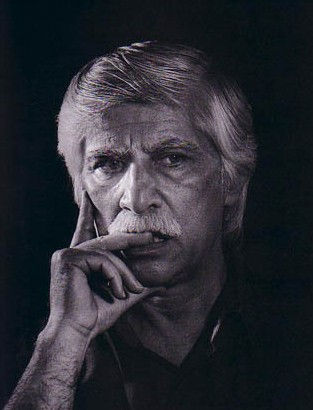
- Bahrām Beyzai pictured by Fakhraddin Fakhraddini in 2002
- Plays↙: ~40
- Scripts↙: ~50
- Research↙: 5

This is a list of written works by Bahram Beyzai.

Since 1960, Beyzai has authored over seventy books in Persian, including plays and screenplays as well as histories and research works and interviews and stories, some of which have been translated into other languages including English.

== Plays ==
=== In English Translation ===
- Aurash (tr. Soheil Parsa and Peter Farbridge)
- The Marionettes (tr. Gisèle Kapuscinski, M.R. Ghanoonparvar, John Green, Parvin Loloi, Glyn Pursglove)
- Evening in a Strange Land (1963) and The Story of the Hidden Moon (1963) (tr. Gisèle Kapuscinski)
- Four Boxes (tr. M.R. Ghanoonparvar)
- Death of Yazdgerd (tr. Manuchehr Anvar) / The Death of the King (tr. Soheil Parsa and Peter Farbridge)
- Memoirs of the Actor in a Supporting Role (tr. M.R. Ghanoonparvar)
- Kalat Claimed (tr. Manuchehr Anvar)
- The One Thousand and First Night (tr. Saeed Talajooy)
- Afra or the Day Is Passing (tr. Saeed Talajooy)
- Naqqali Trilogy (tr. Richard Saul Chason and Nikta Sabouri)

=== In French Translation ===
- Bayz̤āʼī, Bahrām (1990). Le Huitième Voyage de Sindbad : pièce persane. Translated by Ahmad Kamyabi Mask. Paris: A. Kamyabi Mask. ISBN 9782950480613.

== Screenplays ==
=== In English Translation ===
- A New Prologue to the Shahnameh

== Non-fiction ==
=== Books ===
- Theatre in Iran (1965)

=== Chapters ===
- "On the Situation of Theatre and Cinema"
- "Meskoob’s Reading of Iranian Mythology" in A Scholar for our Times: A Celebration of the Life and Work of Shahrokh Meskoob (2022)
