= Bahram Beyzai filmography =

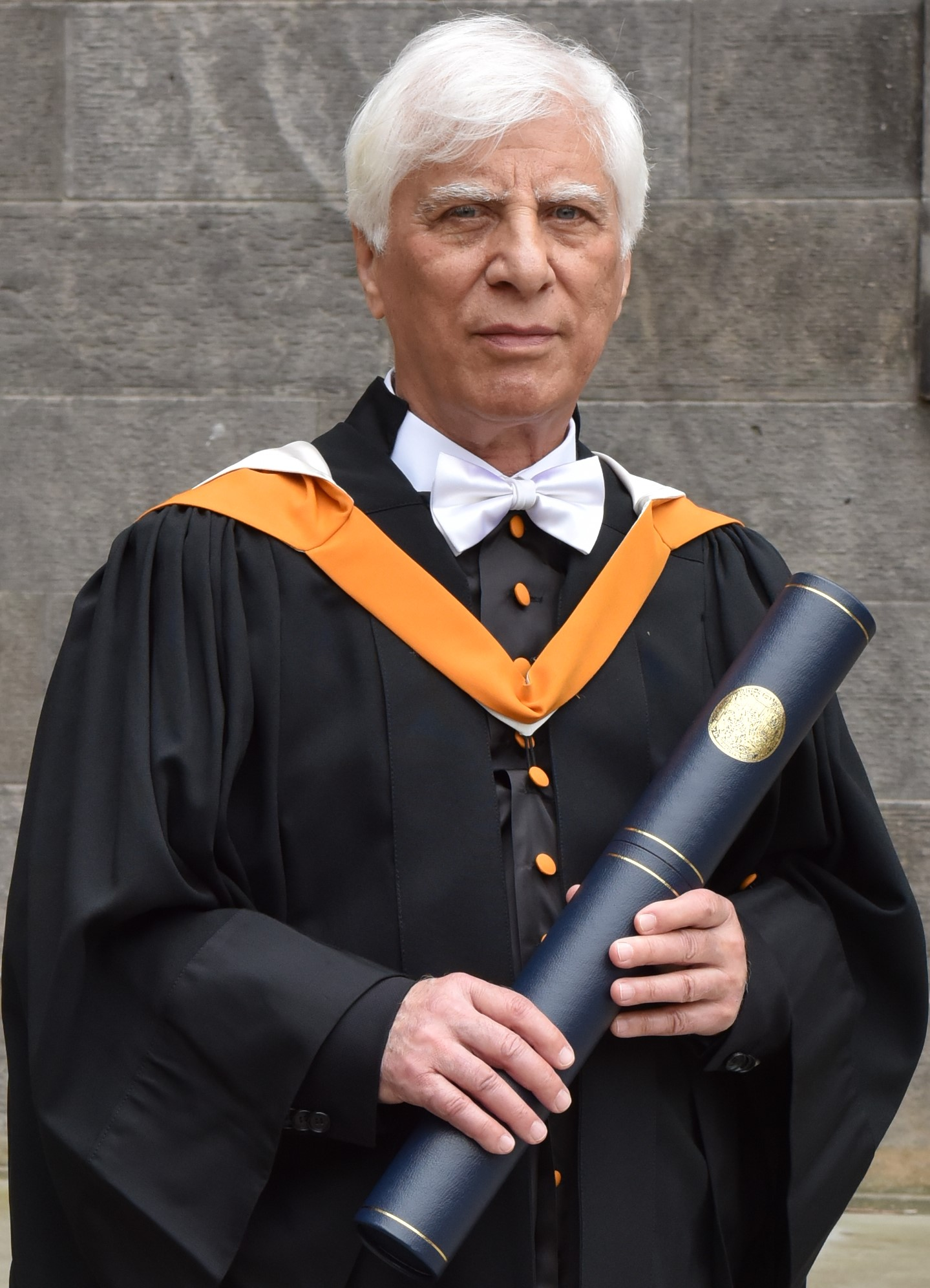
- Film: 14

Film maker and playwright Bahram Beyzai has produced ten feature films and four shorts.

== Films ==
Year	English title	Original (Persian) title	Writer	Director	Editor	Producer credit	Score	Notes									
Year	English title	Original (Persian) title	Writer	Director	Editor	Producer credit	Score	Notes	1970	Uncle Mustache	عمو سیبیلو	Yes	Yes	Ganjour	IIDCYA	Esfandiar Monfaredzadeh	short (28 minutes)
1971	Downpour	رگبار	Yes	Yes	Mehdi Rajaian	Barbod Taheri	Sheida Gharachedaghi										
1972	The Journey (1970 film)	سفر	Yes	Yes	Yes	Mohsen Nosrati		short, uncredited as editor									
1974	The Stranger and the Fog	غریبه و مه	Yes	Yes	Yes	M. T. Shokrai											
1977	The Crow (1977 film)	کلاغ	Yes	Yes	Yes	Bahman Farmanara	Sheida Gharachedaghi										
1979	Ballad of Tara	چریکه‌ی تارا	Yes	Yes	Yes	Yes											
1981	Death of Yazdgerd	مرگ یزدگرد	Yes	Yes	Yes	Yes	Babak Bayat										
1986	Bashu, the Little Stranger	باشو، غریبه‌ی کوچک	Yes	Yes	Yes	IIDCYA											
1988	Maybe Some Other Time	شاید وقتی دیگر	Yes	Yes	Yes	M. A. Farajallahi, H. Nourallahi, R. Alipour Mota'alem, A. Delshad Ershadi	Babak Bayat										
1992	Travellers (film)	مسافران	Yes	Yes	Yes	Yes	Babak Bayat										
1998	Speaking with the Wind	گفتگو با باد	Yes	Yes	Yes	Yes		short (20 minutes)									
2001	Killing Mad Dogs	سگ‌کشی	Yes	Yes	Yes	Yes	Vartan Sahakian, Saba Khozoui										
2006	The Eloquent Carpet	قالی سخنگو	Yes	Yes	Yes	Reza Mirkarimi	Mohammad-Reza Darvishi	short, being an episode in Persian Carpet (film)									
2009	When We Are All Asleep	وقتی همه خوابیم	Yes	Yes	Yes	Yes	Mohammad-Reza Darvishi										

== Films based on Beyzai's books ==
- Salandar (1981)
- Red Line (1981 film)
- Salandar (1994)
- The Fateful Day (1995)
- Closely
- The Fifth Season (1996 film)

== Films edited for other directors ==
- The Runner (1985 film)

== See also ==
- Bahram Beyzai bibliography
- Persian cinema
- List of Iranian films
