= List of awards and nominations received by Bahram Beyzai =

Below is a list of awards and nominations received by Bahram Beyzai (1938).

== Film awards ==
Festival	Year	Film	Award	Result
Moscow International Film Festival	1972	Downpour	Grand jury prize	Won
Moscow International Film Festival	1972	The Journey	Best short	Won
Tehran International Film Festival	1972	Downpour	Grand jury prize	Won
Chicago International Film Festival	1972	The Journey	Best short	Won
Chicago International Film Festival	1972	Downpour	Best film	Nominated
Sepas Film Festival	1973	Downpour	Best screenplay	Won
Sepas Film Festival	1973	Downpour	Best film	Won
Cairo International Film Festival	1975	The Stranger and the Fog	Special award	Won
Valladolid International Film Festival	1980	Ballad of Tara	Best film	Won
Three Continents Festival	1976	The Crow	Golden Montgolfiere	Nominated
Three Continents Festival		The Crow	Grand jury prize	Won
Three Continents Festival	1987	Maybe Some Other Time	Golden Montgolfiere	Nominated
Film and Art Festival of France	1990	Bashu, the Little Stranger	First prize	Won
Aubervilliers International Art Film Festival	1990	Bashu, the Little Stranger	Best film	Won
International Adana Film Festival	1990	Bashu, the Little Stranger	Grand jury prize	Won
Fajr International Film Festival	1988	Maybe Some Other Time	Best editor	Nominated
Fajr International Film Festival	1992	Travellers	Best film	Nominated
Fajr International Film Festival	1992	Travellers	Best director	Nominated
Fajr International Film Festival	1992	Travellers	Best editor	Nominated
Fajr International Film Festival	1992	Travellers	Grand jury prize	Won
Fajr International Film Festival	1995	The Fateful Day	Best screenplay	Nominated
Fajr International Film Festival	2001	Killing Mad Dogs	Best film	Nominated
Fajr International Film Festival	2001	Killing Mad Dogs	Best director	Nominated
Fajr International Film Festival	2001	Killing Mad Dogs	Best screenplay	Won
Fajr International Film Festival	2001	Killing Mad Dogs	Audience choice of best film	Won
Fajr International Film Festival	2009	When We Are All Asleep	Best film	Nominated
Fajr International Film Festival	2009	When We Are All Asleep	Best director	Nominated
Fajr International Film Festival	2009	When We Are All Asleep	Best editor (Note: with Sepideh Abdolvahab)	Won
Iran Cinema Celebration	2001	Killing Mad Dogs	Best film	Nominated
Iran Cinema Celebration	2001	Killing Mad Dogs	Iran's Film Critics and Writers Association's choice	Nominated
Iran Cinema Celebration	2001	Killing Mad Dogs	Best director	Won
Iran Cinema Celebration	2001	Killing Mad Dogs	Best screenplay	Nominated
Iran Cinema Celebration	2001	Killing Mad Dogs	Best Editor	Nominated
Hafez Awards	2001	Travellers	Best of the 1990s	Won
Hafez Awards	2007	A decade's work		Won
International Istanbul Film Festival	2004	Lifetime achievement		Won
Shahr International Film Festival	2008	Oeuvre		Won
Parvin E'tesami Film Festival	2009	Bashu, the Little Stranger	Most influential film about woman	Won

== Other awards ==
- International Board on Books for Young People diploma (1974)
- D.Litt. honoris causa from the University of St Andrews (2017)
