= List of plays directed by Bahram Beyzai =

Bahram Beyzai (1938) has directed one television play and fourteen stage plays, including a double-bill.

== Table ==
Plays
Date	Title	Original (Persian) title	Venue	Writer	Video	Music	etc.
1967	The Marionettes	عروسکها	National Iranian Radio and Television	Bahram Beyzai	(manoto tv on YouTube)		National Art Troupe
1967	Heritage and Banquet	ضیافت و میراث	Sangelaj Theatre	Bahram Beyzai	No		National Art Troupe
1969	King Serpent	سلطان مار	Sangelaj Theatre; Northern Iran towns	Bahram Beyzai	No		National Art Troupe
1979	Death of Yazdgerd	مرگ یزدگرد	City Theater of Tehran	Bahram Beyzai	No		
1997 & 1998	The Lady Aoi	بانو آئویی	Khane-ye Koochak-e Namayesh; City Theater of Tehran	Yukio Mishima	Yes		Parchin Theatre Troupe
1998	The Deeds of Bondar the Counselor	کارنامه‌ی بندار بیدخش	City Theater of Tehran; Theater an der Ruhr	Bahram Beyzai	Yes		Lisar troupe
2003	The Thousand-First Night	شب هزارویکُم	City Theater of Tehran	Bahram Beyzai	Yes	Mohammad-Reza Darvishi	Lisar troupe
2005	The Passion of Makan and Rokhshid	مجلس شبیه در ذکر مصایب استاد نوید ماکان و همسرش مهندس رخشید فرزین	City Theater of Tehran	Bahram Beyzai	Yes	Mohammad-Reza Darvishi	Lisar troupe
2007	Afra or the Day Is Passing	افرا، یا روز می‌گذرد	Vahdat Hall	Bahram Beyzai	Yes	Mohammad-Reza Darvishi	Lisar troupe
2012.6.27 - 2012.6.30	Jana and Baladoor	جانا و بلادور	Cubberley Community Center	Bahram Beyzai	Yes		
June 2013	Arash	آرش	Annenberg Auditorium, Stanford University	Bahram Beyzai	Yes		
2015.1.24 - 2015.1.25	Ardaviraf's Report	گزارش ارداویراف	Cubberley Auditorium, Stanford University	Bahram Beyzai	Yes		
2016.3.26 - 2016.4.3 & 2016.10.21 - 2016.10.30	Tarabnameh	طرب‌نامه	De Anza College	Bahram Beyzai	Yes		
2018.3.23 - 2018.4.1	Crossroads	چهارراه	Roble Hall	Bahram Beyzai	Yes	Faraz Minooie	
