= Four boxes =

Four boxes may refer to:

- Four Boxes Gallery, an art gallery in Krabbesholm Højskole, Denmark
- Four Boxes (film), a 2009 horror movie
- Four Boxes (play), a play by Bahram Beyzai
- Four boxes test, used to measure postoperative cognitive dysfunction
- Four boxes of liberty, the concept that liberty rests on four boxes: soap, ballot, jury and cartridge
