= Fannizadeh =

Fannizadeh is an Iranian surname. Notable people with the surname include:

- Donya Fannizadeh (1967–2016), Iranian puppeteer
- Parviz Fannizadeh (1938–1980), Iranian actor and television star
