= Amin Tarokh =

Iranian actor (1953–2022)

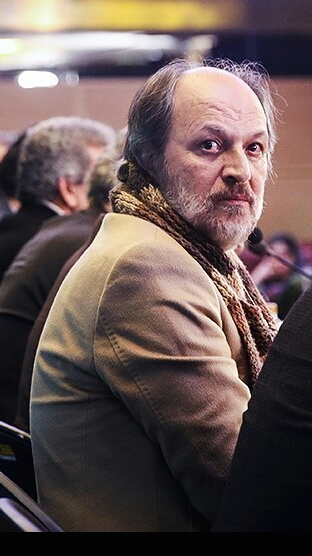
- Tarokh at the 35th Fajr Film Festival (2017)
- Born: 11 August 1953; Shiraz, Iran
- Died: 24 September 2022 (aged 69); Tehran, Iran
- Occupation: Actor
- Years active: 1973–2022
- Spouse: Mansoureh Shadmanesh
- Children: 3

Amin Tarokh (Persian: امین تارخ; 11 August 1953 – 24 September 2022) was an Iranian actor. He has received various accolades, including a Crystal Simorgh, a Hafez Award. He also used to teach acting and was the teacher of famous actors like Taraneh Alidoosti, Gelareh Abbasi, Shabnam Moghaddami, Navid Pourfaraj, Pouria Rahimisam, Majid Vasheghani, Hedieh Bazvand and more.

== Early life ==
Tarokh was born in Shiraz. After finishing high school in Shiraz, he started his education at Tehran University. He graduated from University of Tehran with a degree in cultural management. Tarokh had three sons named Nima, Mani and Nami. He also had a casting production company in Tehran.

== Career ==
Tarokh started acting in 1973. He opened the first acting school in 1994, "The Open Workshop of Acting". His graduates have won many awards. In 2000, he connected his school to other international acting schools, and he was invited to Australia to teach in the Flinders Drama centre. There he taught for two years. He was a member of the judging council in numerous festivals, and also a member of the House of Cinema. He was invited to many festivals in other countries, such as Germany. As of 1995, he was considered one of the influential figures in reviving Theatrical art in Iran.

== Death ==
Tarokh died from a heart attack in Tehran, on 24 September 2022, at the age of 69.

== Filmography ==
=== Film ===
Year	Title	Role	Director	Notes
1982	Death of Yazdgerd	General Espahbod	Bahram Beyzai	
1984	Sarbadars	Hassan Jouri	Mohammad Ali Najafi	
1986	The Baggage		Jalal Moghaddam	
1988	Little Bird of Happiness	Khalil Sohrabi	Pouran Derakhshandeh	
1988	Payizan	Masoud	Rasoul Sadrameli	
1989	The Lead	Danial	Masoud Kimiai	
1990	Mother	Jala Aldin	Ali Hatami	
1992	Love-stricken	Taher	Ali Hatami	
1992	The Status		Ebrahim Vahidzadeh	
1993	Sara	Hesam	Dariush Mehrjui	
1995	Shaykh Mufid		Sirous Moghaddam, Fariborz Saleh	
1996	The Conspiracy		Ali Ghavitan	
1997	Moon and Sun		Mohammad Hossein Haghighi	
1997	Saghar		Sirous Alvand	
1998	Love + 2	Mahmoud	Reza Karimi	
1998	Seven Stones		Abdolreza Navab Safavi	
2004	Secrets		Mohammad Reza A'alami	
2006	Havana File	Dr. Mohsen Pezhman	Alireza Raeesian	
2006	The Boss	Colonel Reza Javid	Masoud Kimiai	
2006	25 O' Clock		Masoud Abparvar	
2007	The Rule of the Game		Ahmad Reza Motamedi	
2007	Barefoot in Heaven		Bahram Tavakoli	
2009	Zamharir		Ali Rouintan	
2009	Red Garden		Amir Samavati	
2016	Dead End of Trust	Reza Vosough	Hamid Kaviani	
2018	Behind the Wall of Silence	Setareh's father	Masoud Jafari Jozani	

=== Web ===
Year	Title	Role	Director	Platform
2020–2021	Blue Bood	Mehrdad	Behrang Tofighi	Filimo, Namava
2021	Mutual Friendship	Himself	Shahab Hosseini	Namava
2021–2022	Lunar Eclipse	Mehrad	Maziar Miri	Namava

=== Television ===
Year	Title	Role	Director	Network	Notes
1975–1976	My City, Shiraz		Shahrokh Zolriastin	NIT	TV series
1977	Iranian Heritage		Mahmoud Mohammad Yousef	NIT	TV series
1983	Sarbadars	Hassan Jouri	Mohammad Ali Najafi	IRIB TV1	TV series
2015	Sometimes Look Behind You	Jalal Tabesh	Maziar Miri	IRIB TV2	TV series
2017–2018	Awning	Mehran	Jamshid Mahmoudi	IRIB TV2	TV series
2018	Don't Leave Me	Rasoul Tavalaee	Mohammad Mehdi Asgarpour	IRIB TV3	TV series

== Awards and nominations ==
Year	Movie	Award	Category	Result
1995	Moon and Sun	Fajr Film Festival	Best Supporting Actor	Won
2004	Havana Files	Fajr Film Festival	Best Actor	Nominated
