= Raminfar =

Raminfar (Persian: رامین‌فر) is a Persian surname. Notable people with the surname include:

- Iraj Raminfar (born 1949), Persian art director, production designer, and costume designer
- Rima Raminfar (born 1970), Iranian actor and screenwriter
