= Iraj Raminfar =

Iranian production designer, art director

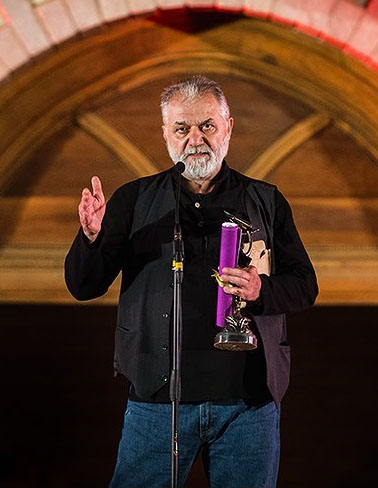
Raminfar in 2015

Iraj Raminfar (Persian: ایرج رامین‌فر, also spelled Iradj Raminfar; born 1949) is an Iranian art director, production designer and costume designer. He graduated in art directing from FDA and studied architecture in France. He began working in cinema with Stranger and Fog (1975). As one of the most prominent art directors, he has published a book (Film Design) based on his experiences.

== Awards ==
Raminfar received the prize for Killing Mad Dogs (2001), Persian Prince(M. Noorizad) 2005, When We Are All Asleep(B. Bayzai) 2009, and The Crime(M. Kimiai) 2011, from Fajr International Film Festival.

== Selected filmography ==
- The Crow, 1977
- Ballad of Tara, 1978
- Death of Yazdgerd, 1981
- The Inner Devil, 1983
- Bashu
- The Little Stranger, 1986 (screened in 1989)
- Maybe Some Other Time, 1987
- Canary Yellow
- The Lead, 1988
- Fifth of June Flight
- Reyhaneh, 1989
- The Quiet Home, 1990
- Travellers, 1991
- The Day of Devil, 1994
- Prostration on Water, 1996
- The Circle, 1999
- The Hidden Half, 2001
- The insane flew away, 2003
- Crimson Gold, 2004
- Mercy, 2005
- Offside, 2006
- A few days later, 2007
- When We Are All Asleep, 2008
- The Crime, 2010
- Give Back(STERDAD), 2011
- Do Not Be Tired!, 2012
- What is The Time in Your World, 2013
- Risk of Acid Rain, 2014
