= Susan Taslimi =

Iranian actress, film director, theatre director and screenwriter

- سوسن تسلیمی
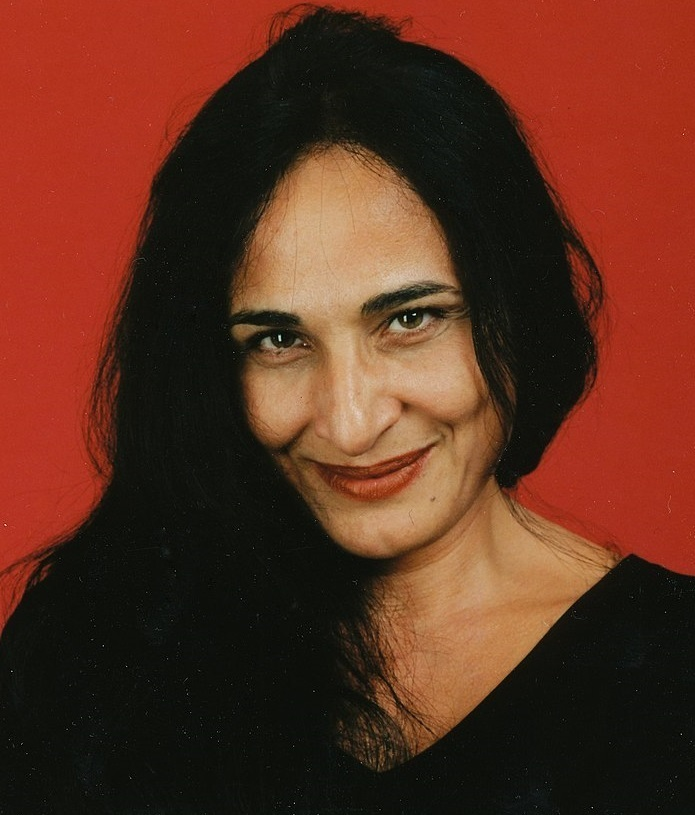
- Born: 7 February 1950 (age 76); Rasht, Iran
- Education: University of Tehran
- Occupations: Actress; director; screenwriter
- Years active: 1972–present
- Notable work: Ballad of Tara; Death of Yazdgerd; Bashu, the Little Stranger
- Spouse: Dariush Farhang (divorced)
- Children: 1

Susan Taslimi (also spelled Soosan and Sousan; Persian: سوسن تسلیمی; born 7 February 1950) is an Iranian-Swedish film and theatre actress, director and screenwriter. She emigrated from Iran in 1987, and now lives and works in Sweden.

== Early and personal life ==
Born in Rasht in 1950 to film producer Khosro Taslimi and actress Monireh Taslimi, Susan Taslimi is the first non-European to play the lead role on a national theater stage in Sweden. Her brother Cyrous is also an actor and film producer.

She graduated in theater and acting from the Faculty of Fine Arts of the University of Tehran and started film acting with Bahram Bayzai's Ballad of Tara in 1979. She was married to film director and actor Dariush Farhang.

== Filmography (as an actress) ==
=== Films ===
- Ballad of Tara (Persian: چریکه تارا, Tcherike-ye Tara, 1979, Iran) – as Tara
- Death of Yazdgerd (مرگ یزدگرد, Marg-e Yazdgerd, 1982, Iran) – as The Miller's wife
- Sarbedaran (سربداران; TV series, 1984, Iran) – as Fatemeh
- Madian (مادیان, a.k.a. The Mare, 1985, Iran)
- Telesm (طلسم, a.k.a. The Spell, 1986, Iran) – as Shahzdeh's bride
- Bashu, the Little Stranger (باشو، غریبه کوچک, Bashu, Gharibe-ye Kuchak, 1986, released in 1989, Iran) – as Naii
- Perhaps Some Other Time (شاید وقتی دیگر, Shayad Vaghti Digar, 1988, Iran)
- Gränsen (a.k.a. Never, 1995, Sweden) – as Aisha
- En dag i taget (TV series, 1999, Sweden) – as Kia
- Orka! Orka! (TV series, 2004, Sweden) – as Schole
- The Charmer (افسونگر, Afsungar; 2017, Denmark) – as Leila
- Black Crab (film) (Swedish: Svart krabba; 2022, Sweden) – as Admiral Nodh

=== Theatre ===
- Medea (1991) – as Medea
- Death of Yazdgerd (1979) – as the Miller's wife

== Filmography (as a director) ==
- Hus i helvete (feature film, a.k.a. All Hell Let Loose, 2002)
- Orka! Orka! (TV series, episodes 16-18, 2004)
- Det epileptiska riktmärket. (play by Martina Montelius, premier March 2004 at Teater Galeasen, Stockholm)
- Älskar, älskar och älskar. (TV drama based on play by Martina Montelius, 2004, Swedish Television)
- Häktet (TV series, 2005)
