= One Light =

One Light may refer to:

- "One Light", a 2003 song by Skid Row from Thickskin
- "One Light", a 2013 song by 3 Doors Down from The Greatest Hits
- "One Light", a 2015 song by Kalafina from Far on the Water
- "One Light", a 2021 song by Maroon 5 from Jordi
- "One Light", an apartment high rise and one of the tallest buildings in Kansas City, Missouri

== See also ==
- One-light
- Onelight Theatre
