= Firooz Malekzadeh =

Iranian cinematographer

Firooz Malekzadeh (Persian: فیروز ملک‌زاده) was one of Iran's top cinematographers in the 1970s and 1980s. He has worked on over 50 films in Iran with many respected directors including Bahram Beizai, Abbas Kiarostami and Amir Naderi.

The New York Times critic Janet Maslin praised Malekzadeh's work on the 1990 film Bashu, the Little Stranger as "beautifully photographed;" the Routledge Encyclopedia of Films called Bashu "a seminal work in the history of post-Revolutionary Iranian cinema."

At the 1976 inaugural Cairo International Film Festival, Malekzadeh won a special award, with fellow director of photography Mehrdad Fakhimi, for their film Stranger and the Fog (1976).

== Selected filmography ==
- Dreams For Life, 2004
- Bashu, 1989
- Khun-bas, 1992
- Davande, 1985
- Madian, 1986
- Golha-ye Davoudi, 1985
- Entezar, 1974
- Gharibe va Meh, 1974
- Mosafer, 1974
- Safar, 1972
