= Niloofar Beyzaie =

Iranian dramaturge, playwright and theatre director

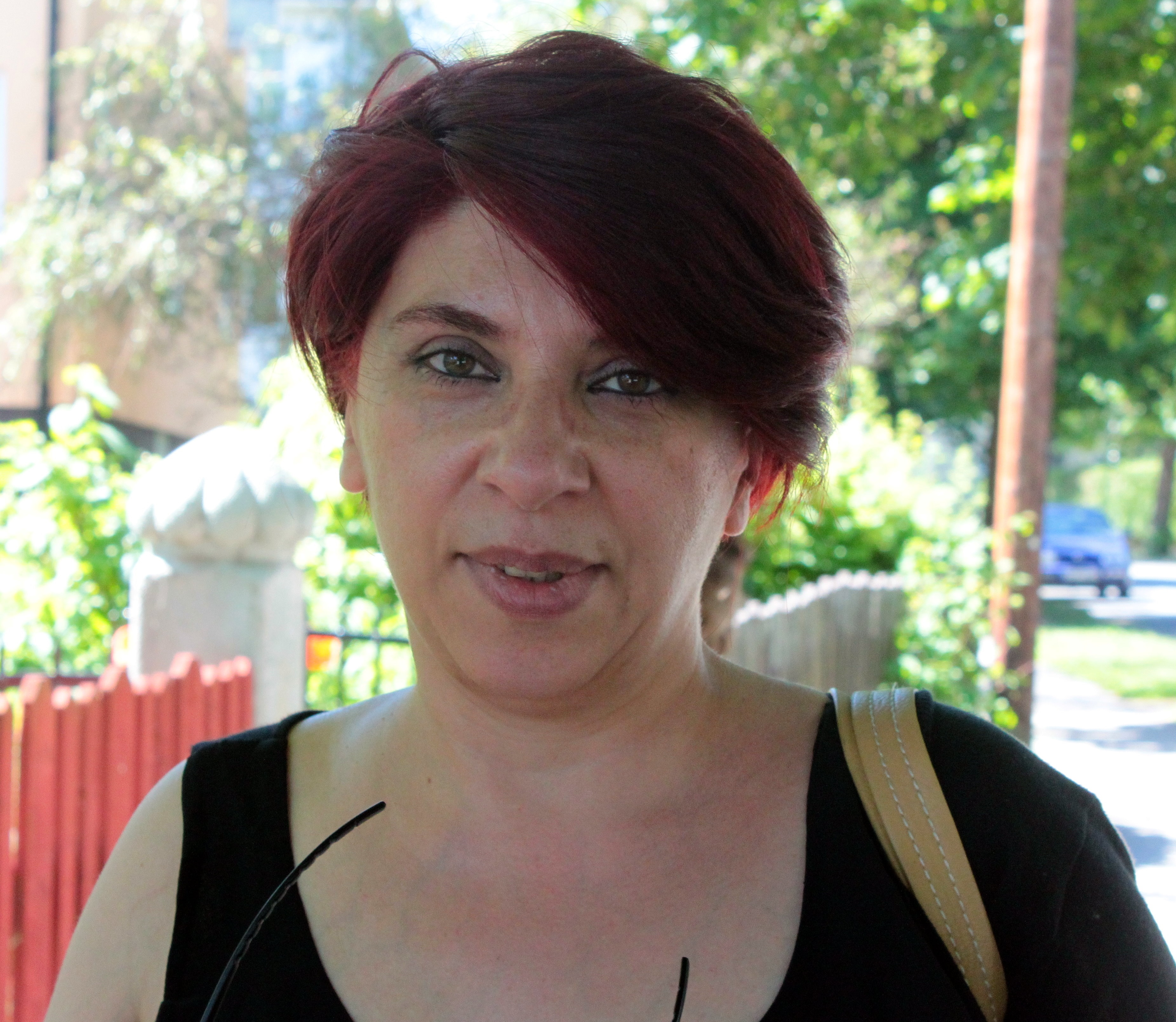
Niloofar Beyzaie

Niloofar Beyzaie (born January 15, 1967, in Tehran) is an Iranian dramaturge, playwright and theatre director who lives in exile in Germany.

== Life ==
Niloofar Beyzaie is the daughter of the Iranian theater and film director Bahram Beyzaie (Bahram Beyzai) and Monir Azam Raminfar who comes from a family of artists. Her uncle Iraj Raminfar is one of the best known costume designers and scenic designers (Theatre and Film) in Iran. Her mother's uncle Abbas Javanmard was an influential stage directors of the 1940s-70s in Iran.

In 1985, Beyzaie had to leave Iran for political reasons and studied German studies, Theater, Film and Media Studies and Pedagogy at the Johann Wolfgang Goethe University in Frankfurt am Main in Germany. After finishing her academic studies (Master of Arts) she founded, in 1994, the theater group "Daritsche". Since then, she is leading this group as stage director, playwright, and light and costume designer. She is married and has a daughter.

She advocates for women's rights and for the LGBTQ community in Iran and is involved for the rights of religious minorities in Iran, in particular the officially persecuted Baháʼís.

== Career ==
Central themes of her theater work are "woman", "the suffering of individuals among the crowd" and "being a stranger either in the own or in the foreign society". She also puts emphasis on the sociopolitical context of the theater in its contemporary issues. In addition to her theatrical work she writes articles about the political and social situation, particularly the situation of women in Iran. 2005, she was awarded the Persian "World Academy of Art, Literature and Media" in Budapest as the best theatre director in exile in the category "the Performing Arts". In the same year, her play Daughters of the Sun (Come, dance with me) was performed in Zurich by Maralam Theater under direction of Peter Braschler. The revival of her play No Man's Land was performed in German in March 2009 in Karlsruhe within the framework of the "Cultural Perspectives of Women festival 09".

Her play "Face to Face at the Threshold of the Cold Season" is about two very important women of the Iranian history "Táhirih Qurratu'l- ayn" and "Forough Farrokhzad" had its premiere in October 2011 and was also performed in Toronto, Ottawa and Los Angeles

Her play, In the presence of the Wind, was written by her father in the 1960s and was played in several cities of Europe and Germany from 2015 until October 2016.

Her play, In this Place and at this Time (based on the stories of Mahshid Amirshahi) was played in Frankfurt, Cologne, Berlin, Heidelberg and Zürich from October 2017 to May 2018. ّShe received the audience award for best play for this piece from the Iranian Theater Festival in Heidelberg on February 3, 2018.

Beyzaie was honored for her lifelong theater work on March 2–3, 2018 by "the cultural society of Iranian women" in Vancouver. In this context, the play Lady in Mirror, which consists of parts of her plays, was performed by the Theatre group Shahrzad. She also received the Prize as the best Personality of the year 2018 from the "Foundation of Pasargad Heritage" for the fields of Art and Culture in March 2018.

In 2022 she staged the play "From Nameless Stones to Mahsa, Daughter of Iran". The first episode of this play contains four stories from the wives and mothers of political prisoners in Iran in the 1980s and the second episode deals with the situation in Iran today after the assassination of Jina Mahsa Amini by the Iranian vice squad. This play was performed as part of the solidarity evening with the Iranian protest movement in February 2023 in the Gallustheater in Frankfurt am Main.

== Selected works ==
=== Staging (theatre director) ===
- Marjan, Mani and a few small problems, 1996
- The Last Game, 1997
- No Man's Land, 1998–99
- A knife in the back ( A Play by Kaveh Esmaili), 1999–2000
- The blue dreams of gray women, 2000–2001
- Three Opinions on a death (based on texts by Mina Assadi), 2001–2002
- The Blind Owl (based on a text by Sadegh Hedayat), 2004–2005
- The Blind Owl (bilingual, along with Tom Peifer), 2005
- foreign as you and I (based on a text by Farhang Kassraei and Maria Piniella), 2006–2007
- The Voice of Silence, 2007–2008
- The blind owl (revival), 2008
- No Man's Land (revival in German language), 2009
- One file, two murders, 2009–2010
- Diaries of newspapers or How the revolution ate its grandchildren (Play reading) 2011
- Face to Face at the Threshold of the Cold Season, 2011-2012
- In the presence of the Wind, 2015-2016 (A Play by Bahram Beyzaie)
- In this Place and at this Time, 2017-2018 (based on Texts von Mahshid Amirshahi)
- The Lost Ones, 2018-2020 (based on Text of Roya Ghiasi, Shokoufeh Motazeri, Ghorbanali Shokri)
- When love is a sin 2019 (Text Composition: Zhaleh Mosaed)
- Game within Game 2021
- From nameless stones to Mahsa daughter of Iran 2022-2023 (Based on texts from the book “The Song of Looking Through the Dark Window”, ed.: Mehdi Aslani, N. Rahai and Twitter posts by young Iranians)

=== Playwright ===
- Banu in the mirror city (performed in the same year under direction of Mohsen Hosseini in Frankfurt am Main), 1994
- Marjan, Mani and a few small problems, 1995
- The last game, 1996
- No Man's Land, 1997
- The blue dreams of the gray women, 2000
- Come dance with me (Daughters of the Sun), 2005
- The Voice of Silence, 2006
- One file, two murders, 2009
- Face to Face at the Threshold of the Cold Season, 2011.
- Banu in the mirror (directed by Hessam Anvari, 2018, Vancouver)
- Game within Game 2021

=== Plays (dramaturge) ===
- Three Opinions on a death (based on a text by: Mina Assadi), 2001–2002
- The Blind Owl (based on a text by: Sadegh Hedayat), 2004–2005
- foreign as you and I (based on a text by Farhang Kassraei and Maria Piniella), 2006–2007
- The Voice of Silence, 2007–2008
- Diaries of newspapers or How the revolution ate its grandchildren (Play reading) 2011
- In this Place and at this Time, 2017-2018
- The Lost Ones, 2018-2020
- When love is a sin 2019
- From nameless stones to Mahsa daughter of Iran 2022-2023

== Awards ==
- 2005:Persian "World Academy of Art, Literature and Media"Budapest:Best Director in the Performing Arts category and
- 2018:ََ Audience Award for her Play "In this Place and at this Time" in the Iranian Theater Festival in Heildelberg 3. February 2018.
- 2018:ََ Tribute to Director and Playwright Ms. Niloofar Beyzaie followed by the musical Lady in the Mirror, 2nd and 3.of March 2018.
- 2018: Prize as the best Personality of the year 2018 from the "Foundation of Pasargad Heritage" for the fields of Art and Culture in March 2018

== See also ==
- List of Iranian women
