= The Marionettes =

- front cover of the English edition
- Author: Bahram Beyzai
- Original title: عروسکها
- Translator: Gisèle Kapuscinski; John Green (& M.R. Ghanoonparvar); Sujata G. Bhatt; Jacqueline Hoats; Imran A. Nyazee; Kamiar K. Oskouee; Parvin Loloi & Glyn Pursglove
- Language: Persian
- Genre: Play
- Publisher: Bahram Beyzai, Negah Publishing, Roshangaran Publishing (Iran); University Press of America, Mazda Publishers (US); Poetry Salzburg (Austria)
- Publication date: 1963
- Publication place: Iran
- English publication date: 1987, 1989, 2005
- Media type: Print
- Pages: 112 pp
- ISBN: 978-3-901993-23-7

The Marionettes (1963) (variously translated as "The Puppets" as well) is a puppetry play by Bahram Beyzai, and one of the most important plays of the Persian language. It has been staged numerous times in various languages around the world. Together with two subsequent plays, namely Evening in a Strange Land (1963) and The Story of the Hidden Moon (1963), The Marionettes constitutes the playwright's puppet trilogy.

== Text ==
The play was composed in 1962-1963 and first published in Tehran early in 1963 by the playwright in a volume along with another play of his named Matarsak-ha dar Shab (i.e. "Scarecrows at Night"). Later in the same year The Marionettes was again printed by the playwright; this time as the opening play of his puppet trilogy with two new puppet plays. This volume was reprinted by Negah Publishing in the spring of 1978. Finally, a revised version of the play appeared in 2003 in the first volume of Beyzai's collected works, published by Roshangaran Publishing in Tehran.

Gisèle Kapuscinski's English translation was published in 1987, soon to be followed by another translation into English by M. R. Ghanoonparvar and John Green in 1989, both in the United States. Still a third translation by Parvin Loloi and Glyn Pursglove appeared in Salzburg in 2005.

== Plot ==
In The Marionettes, "the dramatis personae are of universal character, almost myth-types;" as Yarshater explains. They include Hero, Demon, Girl and such other types as Black Man, Merchant, Poet, etc. and of course the puppeteer is ever present. The central theme is the perennial fight between Hero and Demon. Both the central theme and the characters reoccur in the two subsequent puppet plays too, and all the three pieces are "meant to be performed by actors as well."

The master puppeteer sets out to amuse the audience with his puppets. He promises that the time for Hero's fight against Demon has come. But Hero, weary of unending and futile combats with Demon, avoids engagement. He loves Girl, for the sake of which he has waged an eternal battle: against himself. In the meantime, there comes the news of the appearance of a demon at the city gate. So, to urge the Hero into combat against it, three townspeople come to him imploring to break his vow. Hero will not give in. A fortuneteller girl arrives to warn him of his inevitable and imminent death. Recovering a long, dormant love and sorrow at the sight of the fair girl, Hero sets out to war against the demon. He slays his foe and is mortally wounded himself. None of the townspeople is strong enough to pick his fallen sword up. Black Man, a loyal friend to Hero, drops his gay mood and rejects master puppeteer's requests about amusing the audience.

== Performance ==
The play has had several productions around the world in various languages.

The earliest was a television production on National Iranian Radio and Television, directed by the playwright, recorded on 19 March 1967, and first broadcast on 17 April. Mahmoud Dowlatabadi, later a prominent novelist, played the Poet in this production.

The English translation by Parvin Loloi and Glyn Pursglove was staged in England in 2004, with Jodi-Anne George as director of the British premier.

== In Other Languages ==
The Marionettes has three different English translations:

- Beyza'i, Bahram. "The Puppets." Modern Persian Drama: An Anthology. Translated & introduced by Gisèle Kapuscinski. Lanham: University Press of America. 1987. ISBN 0-8191-6579-4
- Beyza'i, Bahram. "Marionettes." Iranian Drama: An Anthology. Compiled & edited by M. R. Ghanoonparvar & John Green. Costa Mesa, CA: Mazda Publishers. 1989. ISBN 0-939214-63-6
- Beyza'i, Bahrām. The Marionettes. Edited by Jodi-Anne George, Parvin Loloi & Glyn Pursglove. Salzburg: Poetry Salzburg. October 2005. ISBN 978-3-901993-23-7

== See also ==
- Salzburg Marionette Theatre
