= Parvaneh Massoumi =

Iranian actress (1945–2023)

- پروانه معصومی
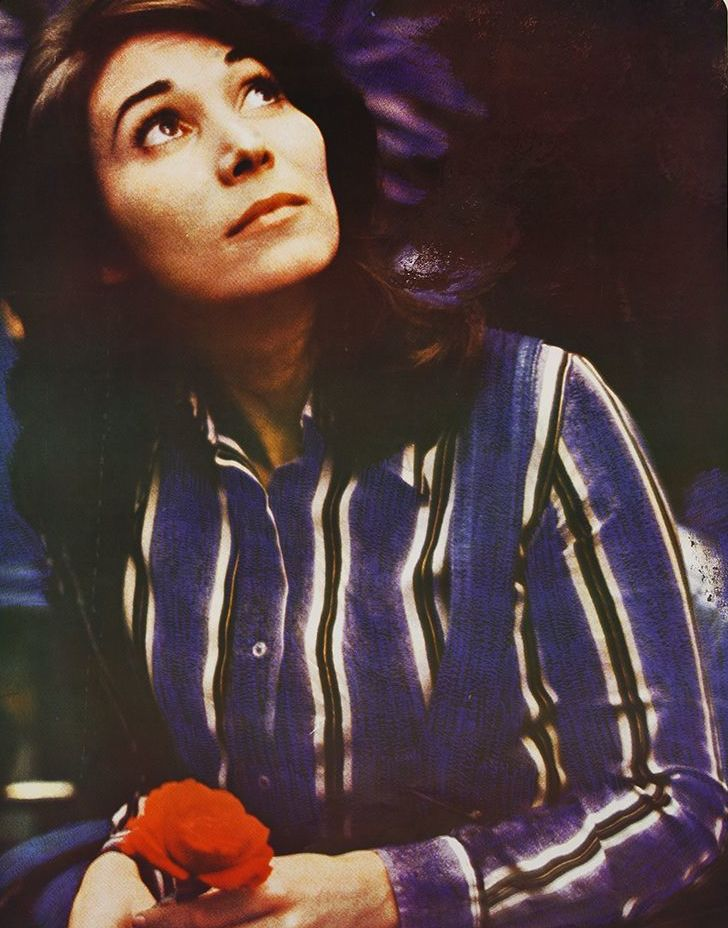
- Massoumi in 1977
- Born: Sakineh Kabodar-Ahanghi; 2 March 1945; Tehran, Iran
- Died: 27 November 2023 (aged 78); Rasht, Iran
- Occupation: Actress
- Years active: 1972–2023

Sakineh Kabodar-Ahangi (Persian: سکینه کبودرآهنگی; 2 March 1945 – 27 November 2023), known professionally as Parvaneh Massoumi (Persian: پروانه معصومی), was an Iranian Actor. She completed her education at the Faculty of Foreign Languages at the National University of Iran. Massoumi made her acting debut in 1971 with a minor role in the film Bita and rose to prominence the following year by playing the lead female role in Raining (Ragbar), directed by Bahram Beyzai. She continued collaborating with Beyzai until his film The Crow (1977), becoming the first prominent female lead in his cinematic works.

She later won the Crystal Simorgh for Best Actress at the Fajr Film Festival for her performances in Chrysanthemums (1984), Dowry for Rabab (1987), and The Splendor of Life (1987).

== Early life ==
Parvaneh Massoumi was born on 11 March 1944 in Tehran. She graduated from the Faculty of Foreign Languages at the National University of Iran and later traveled to Germany for further studies. While in Germany, she met Mosoud Massoumi, a photography student, whom she married. The couple returned to Iran after her studies, and Massoumi began her artistic career in the early 1970s. Her most prolific period in cinema was during the 1980s.

== Artistic career ==
Massoumi debuted in cinema with a minor role alongside Googoosh in Bita, directed by Hajir Dariush. She later noted that she did not see the film until 1995.

In an interview with ISNA, Parvaneh Massoumi described her entry into Bahram Beyzai's works as follows:

"My husband was a commercial photographer, and Mr. Beyzai had seen a photo of me used in an advertisement, which led to Ahmad Reza Ahmadi recommending me for the role of Atefeh in Raining. I was born into a religious family, and at the time I entered cinema, acting was not well-regarded. For this reason, I had no intention of pursuing acting, knowing it would face strong opposition from my family."

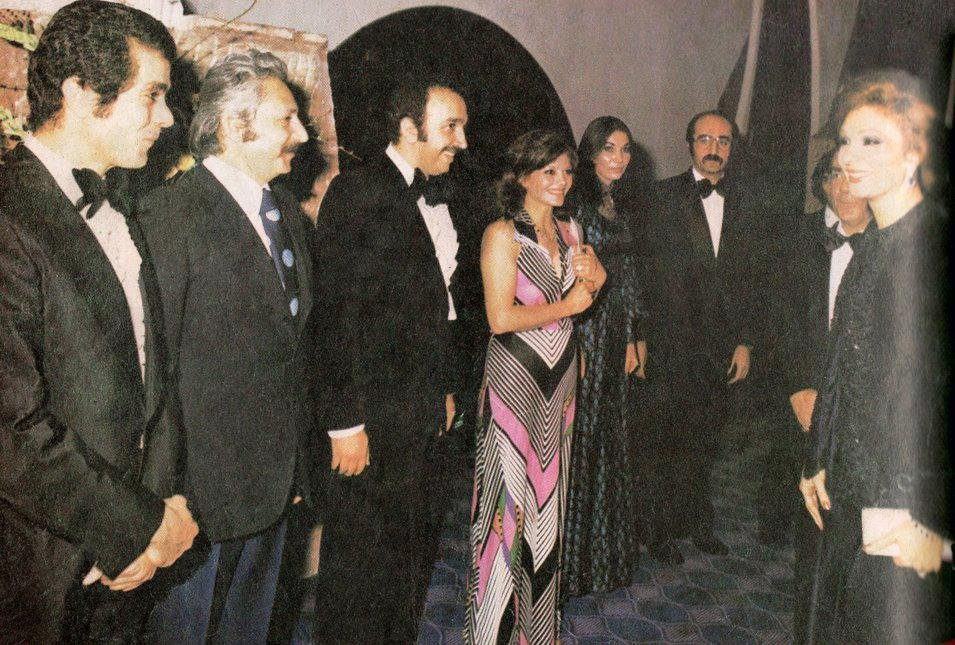
From left to right: Behrouz Vossoughi, Jamshid Mashayekhi, Bahman Farmanara, Fakhri Khorvash, Parvaneh Massoumi, and Kamran Shirdel at a meeting with Empress Farah Pahlavi in 1974.

In 1972, she gained recognition as the female lead in Raining, Beyzai's first feature film. Her performance alongside Parviz Fannizadeh formed one of the most distinctive cinematic pairs of Iran's New Wave movement in the early 1970s. In the film, she portrayed a woman caught in an unconventional love triangle, blending the modesty of a woman raised in traditional family values with a yearning for liberation. The dialogue scene between Massoumi and Fannizadeh in the presence of students remains one of the most memorable sequences in Iranian cinema history. Beyzai cast her in three additional projects: the short film Journey (produced by the Institute for the Intellectual Development of Children and Young Adults) and the feature films Stranger and the Fog (1974) and The Crow (1977).

After the 1979 Iranian Revolution, Massoumi moved to France. Upon her return, her first role was in The Second Way, directed by Hamid Rakhshani. She became a prolific actress during the 1980s, working with notable directors such as Nasser Taghvai in Captain Khorshid and emerging filmmakers of the post-revolution era. She won Crystal Simorgh awards for Best Actress at the Fajr Film Festival for her roles in Chrysanthemums (1984), Dowry for Rabab (1987), and The Splendor of Life (1987).

In the 1990s, Massoumi was less active in cinema but more prominent on television. Her notable performances during this decade included Naser al-Din Shah, Actor of Cinema, directed by Mohsen Makhmalbaf, and Traveler to Rey, directed by Davoud Mirbagheri. This trend continued into the 2000s.

From the early 2000s, while living in Gilan, Massoumi's presence in cinema and television diminished, and she began expressing controversial opinions and viewpoints.

== Controversies ==
In her final two decades, Massoumi's political views, proximity to the government, and religious leanings overshadowed her acting career to some extent. She was among the first female actors to adopt and defend mandatory hijab in Iran after the 1979 Revolution. Her death prompted varied reactions on social media, which differed significantly from the typical responses of cinema enthusiasts mourning the loss of a veteran actor.

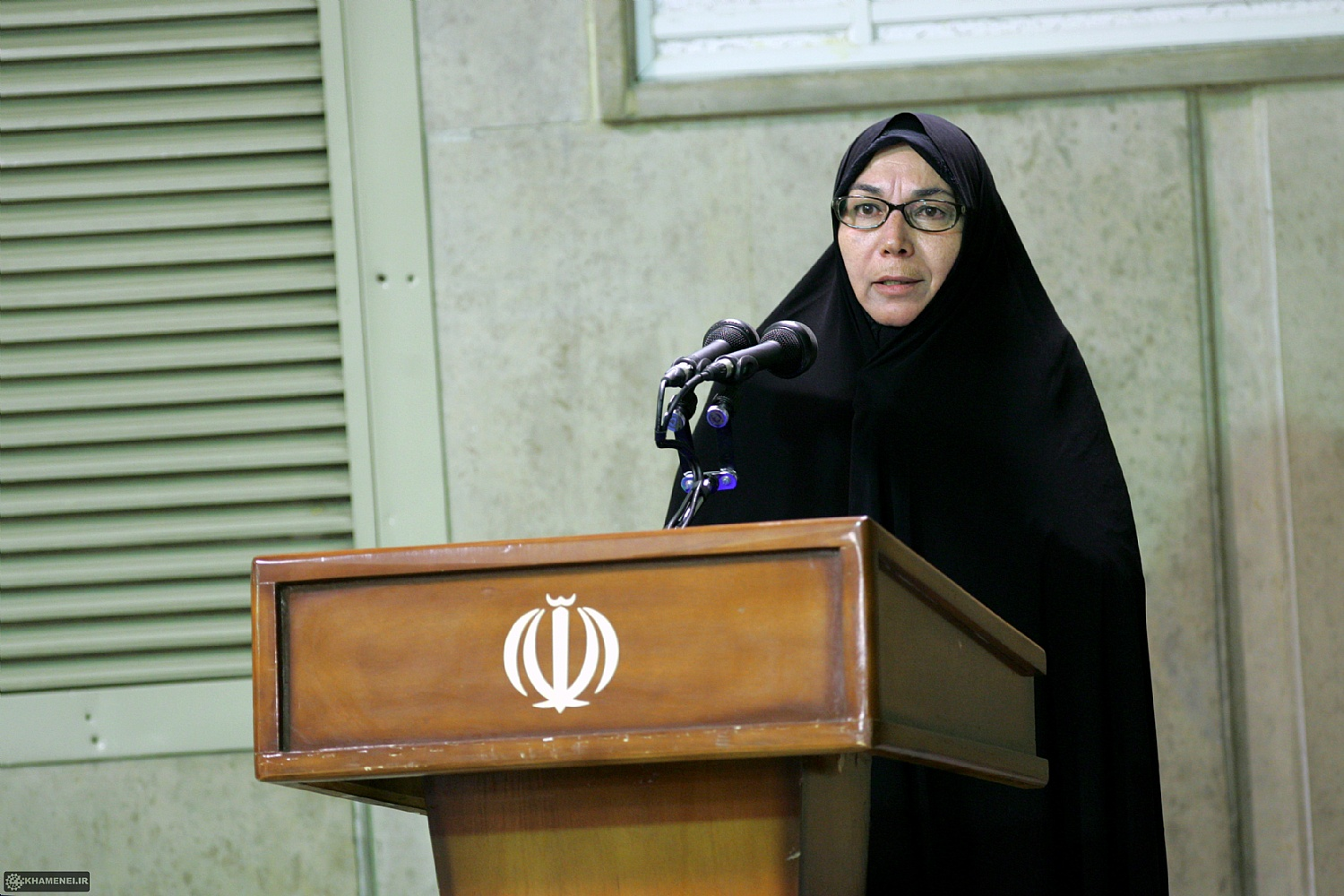
At the meeting of artists with Ali Khamenei, 2010.

In 2010, following the 2009 election protests, Massoumi participated in a meeting of artists with Supreme Leader Ali Khamenei at the Leader's House. During the meeting, she defended the government's stance, stating that there was no compulsion in her choice to wear the chador and that it was her personal decision.

Another controversial statement came in response to Leila Hatami’s critical remarks about the government's treatment of protesters in January 2018. In an interview with Khabaronline, Massoumi claimed that people wanted to attack Hatami in the street over her comments, though she later denied making such a statement.

In response to the Woman, Life, Freedom protests, Massoumi wrote on Twitter: “The Islamic Revolution freed us from the chains of oppression and the captivity of desires, and we will fight to preserve it until our last breath. I place my trust in the Ever-Living who never dies.”

== Death ==
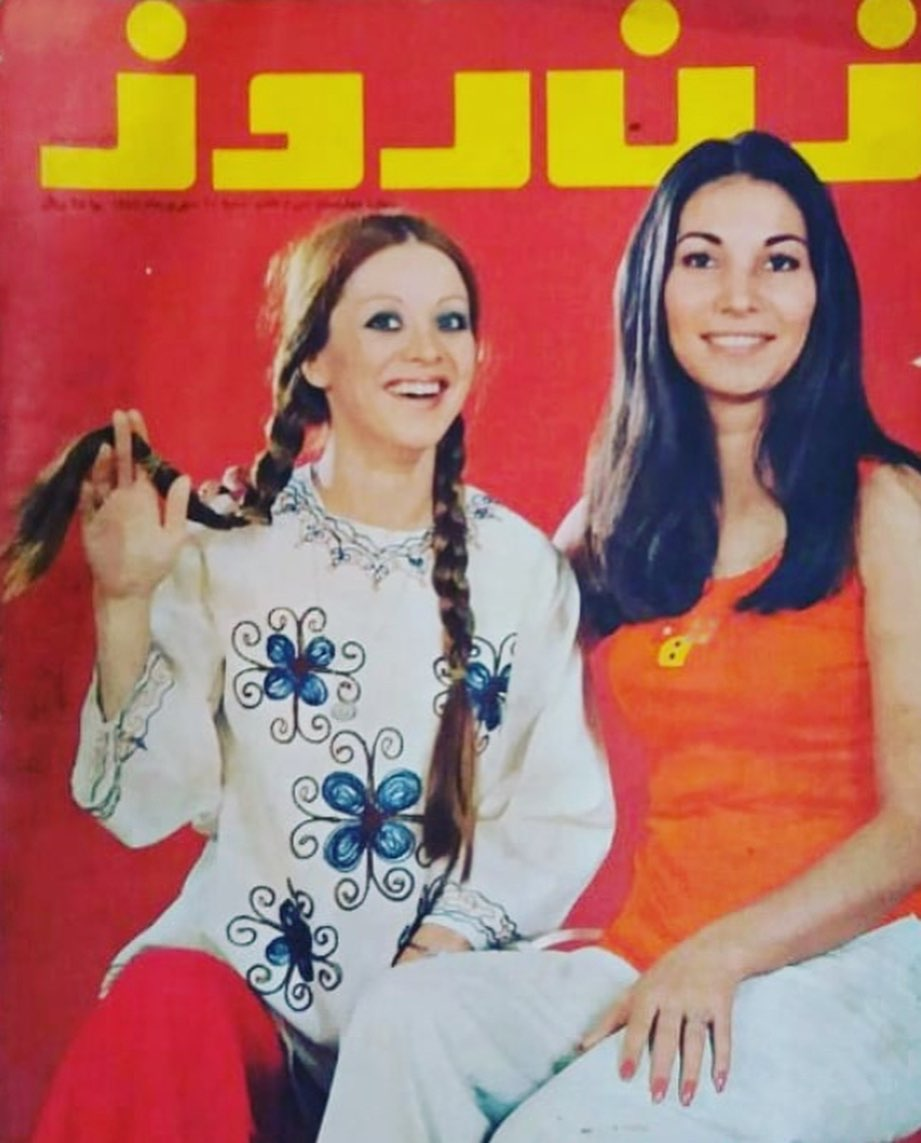
Parvaneh Massoumi alongside Farzaneh Ta'yidi on the cover of Zan-e Rooz magazine

In the last 30 years of her life, Massoumi resided in Tahergourab, a village in Someh Sara, Gilan.

She was hospitalized for several days and transferred to the intensive care unit, dying on 27 November 2023 in Someh Sara. Initial media reports cited intestinal rupture and lung infection as the cause of death, but her son clarified that she suffered from rheumatoid arthritis and died due to a blood infection. Per her wishes, she was laid to rest in her family's burial plot at Imamzadeh Abutaleb in Tehran.

Her funeral took place on 29 November 2023 at Imamzadeh Abutaleb in the Farahzad district, without a memorial ceremony at the House of Cinema and with no notable presence of artists.

== Filmography ==
=== Cinema ===
Year	Title	Director	Notes
1972	Downpour	Bahram Beyzai	
1972	Bita	Hozhir Dariush	
1973	City of Tales	Manouchehr Anvar	
1974	Stranger and the Fog	Bahram Beyzai	
1977	The Crow	Bahram Beyzai	
1984	Nest of Affection	Jalal Moghadam	
1984	Tattoo	Kiumars Pourahmad	
1984	Second Path	Hamid Rakhshani	
1984	Marigolds	Rasoul Sadr Ameli	
1985	Search in the City	Hojjatollah Seifi	
1986	Toranj	Mojtaba Raei	
1986	Suitcase	Jalal Moghadam	
1986	Meeting	Khosrow Masoumi	
1986	Captain Khorshid	Nasser Taghvai	
1987	Gifts	Ebrahim Vahidzadeh	
1987	Dowry for Rabab	Siamak Shayeghi	
1987	Out of Bounds	Rakhshan Bani-Etemad	
1987	Glory of Life	Hassan Mohammadzadeh	
1987	Identification	Mohammadreza Elami	
1988	Years of Ash	Mehdi Sabbaghzadeh	
1988	Touba	Khosrow Malekan	
1989	Contact	Khosrow Malekan	Also served as set and costume designer
1991	Naseruddin Shah, Actor of Cinema	Mohsen Makhmalbaf	
1995	Dead End	Ali Derakhshi	
2000	Traveler to Rey	Davood Mirbagheri	From the television series Traveler to Rey
2003	Promise of Meeting	Jamal Shourjeh	From the television series Veil of Love
2005	Journey to Hidalu	Mojtaba Raei	Not released due to inappropriate content by one of the actors, Zahra Amir Ebrahimi
2005	Persian Prince	Mohammad Nourizad	From the television series Forty Soldiers
2012	Resident of the Wooden House	Hosseinali Lialestani	
2013	Eastern Song	Ehsan Sedighi	
2018	Reverse	Poulad Kimiai	
2018	Janan	Kamran Qadakchian	

=== Television ===
Year	Title	Director	Notes
1984	Little Warrior	Behrooz Afkhami	Network 1
1991	Imam Ali	Davood Mirbagheri	Network 1, 22 episodes
1995	Burnt Hearts	Behrooz Taheri	Network 2
1998	Classmates	Masoud Shahmohammadi, Ahmad Najibzadeh	Network 1
1999	Station	Manouchehr Asgarinasab	Network 2
2000	Traveler to Rey	Davood Mirbagheri	Network 1, Theatrical film version released with the same name
2001	Young Police	Siroos Moghadam	Network 3
2002	Sailors	Siroos Moghadam	Network 5
2002	Rain of Love	Ahmad Amini, Fereydoun Hassanpour	Tehran Network
2002	Veil of Love	Jamal Shourjeh	Network 2, Theatrical film version released as Promise of Meeting
2003	Forty Soldiers	Mohammad Nourizad	Network 2, Theatrical film version released as Persian Prince
2005	Dawn Traveler	Farzin Mahdipour	Network 2
2006	Until Morning	Majid Javanmard, Mohammad Ali Bashe Ahangar	Tehran Network
2008	Address	Rambod Javan	Network 2, Aired during Nowruz
2008	Like No One	Abdolhassan Barzideh	Network 2, Aired during Ramadan
2008	Prophet Joseph	Farajollah Salahshoor	Network 1
2008	Silence of God (Telefilm)	Rama Qavidel	Network 1
2009	Honeymoon	Shahram Ahmadlou	Network 2
2009	Lady Khatoon (Telefilm)	Shahreh Lorestani	
2010	Paradise	Mohammadreza Ahang	Network 2, Aired during Ramadan
2010	Son of Iran (Telefilm)	Shahram Ahmadlou	
2010	Scent of Soil, Fragrance of Rosewater (Telefilm)	Flora Sam	Network 1
2010	Blessing (Telefilm)	Reza Aboufazeli	Network 1
2012	Hidden Secret	Flora Sam	Network 1, Aired during Ramadan
2018	Minoo	Amir Pourvaziri	Network 1
2019	Special Circumstances	Vahid Amirkhani	Network 3
2021	Among Butterflies	Dariush Yari	Network 2

=== Short films ===
Year	Title	Director	Notes
1972	Journey	Bahram Beyzai	
2014	Mother's Tears		

== Awards and honors ==
- Winner of the Crystal Simorgh for Best Actress for her performance in Chrysanthemums at the 3rd Fajr Film Festival
- Winner of the Crystal Simorgh for Best Actress for her performance in Dowry for Rabab at the 6th Fajr Film Festival
