= The Eighth Voyage of Sindbad =

1964 Persian play by Bahram Beyzai

Sindbad's Eighth Voyage
- Original language: Persian
- Written by: Bahram Beyzai
- Characters: Sindbad

The Eighth Voyage of Sindbad (Persian: هشتمین سفر سندباد) is a play by Bahram Beyzai written in 1964.

== Text ==
The text was commissioned by Jafar Vali to be based on a one act piece by Parviz Natel-Khanlari.
