= Four Boxes (play) =

Play by Bahram Beyzai, 1967

- Written by: Bahram Beyzai
- Original language: Persian

Four Boxes (Persian: چهار صندوق) is a play by Bahram Beyzai, written in 1967.

== In English and other languages ==
There are at least three different English translations of this play. M.R. Ghanoonparvar's is titled "Four Boxes" and appears in Iranian Drama: An Anthology (1989). There are also Armenian and Kurdish translations that have been published.
