= Manuchehr Anvar =

Iranian translator and film director

Manuchehr Anvar (Persian: منوچهر انور; born 13 October 1928) is a Persian writer, editor, translator, director, and former BBC radio presenter.

== Translations ==
Manuchehr Anvar
- منوچهر انور
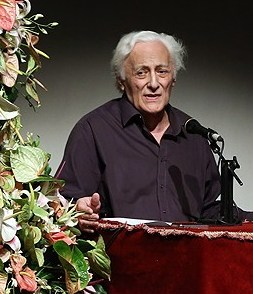
- Born: 1928|10|13; Tehran, Iran
- Other name: Manouchehr Anvar
- Education: Royal Academy of Dramatic Art
- Spouse: Dominique Anvar
- Children: four, including Leili Anvar
- Relatives: Iraj Anvar (brother)

=== Into Persian ===
- A Doll's House by Henrik Ibsen

=== Into English ===
- Kalat Claimed by Bahram Beyzai
- Death of Yazdgerd by Bahram Beyzai

== See also ==
- Esmaeel Azar
- Tahereh Saffarzadeh
- Seyyed Mahdi Shojaee
- Ahad Gudarziani
- Masoumeh Abad
- Ahmad Dehqan
- Akbar Sahraee
