= Kalat Claimed =

Play by Bahram Beyzai

Kalāt Claimed
- Front Cover of the English Edition
- Written by: Bahram Beyzai
- Characters: Tuy Khān; Aralāt; Gur Khān; Suldus; Qarā Khān; Oyerāt; Qāidu; Ur Khān; Vatvāt; Nāimān; Yāmāt; Tuqāi Khān; Dinkiz; Bāyāvot; . . .
- Original language: Persian
- Setting: Mongol conquest of Khwarezmia

Kalāt Claimed (Persian: فتحنامه‌ی کلات) is a play by Bahram Beyzai, written in 1982.

== Text ==
The play was composed in 1982 and inspired by Macbeth, and was first published in Tehran, Iran, in 1984 by Damavand Publishing. Later, it was published by Beyzai's exclusive publisher, Roshangaran, who printed Manucher Anvar's English translation in 2016.

== Plot ==
Two generals in the Mongol conquest of Khwarezmia dispute over who controls Kalat and its ultimate conquest by the Alans.

== In other languages ==
There is an English translation by Manuchehr Anvar, with minor changes by the playwright's request:
