= The Fateful Day (1995 film) =

- Directed by: Shahram Assadi
- Written by: Bahram Beyzai
- Based on: The Fateful Day by Bahram Beyzaei
- Produced by: Morteza Shayesteh
- Starring: Alireza Shoja Nouri; Ladan Mostofi; Ezzatolah Entezami; Mohammad-Ali Keshavarz; Jamshid Mashayekhi; Reza Fayazi; Zhaleh Olov; Mehdi Fat'hi; Hossein Panahi
- Cinematography: Maziar Partow Asghar Rafi'i Jam
- Edited by: Mehdi Rajaeian
- Music by: Majid Entezami
- Release date: 1995
- Running time: 105 minutes
- Country: Iran
- Language: Persian

The Fateful Day (Persian: روز واقعه) is a 1995 Iranian Islamic film based on a script of the same name by Bahram Beyzai. The film is directed by Shahram Assadi. Its cast includes many Iranian cinema stars. Wheeler W. Dixon describes it as "an enormous hit in its home country."

Beyzai's screenplay was already published as a well-known book ten years prior to when the film was made. The script was offered to Shahram Asadi in order to be made into a movie.

== Plot ==
The story is of a Christian youth who converts to Islam for the love of a Muslim girl at the time of Husayn ibn Ali. At the wedding, he hears voices calling for help. He leaves the ceremony and takes a journey to Karbala. But he arrives after the Battle of Karbala.

== Cast ==
- Ezzatolah Entezami as Abdullah
- Alireza Shoja Nouri
- Mohammad-Ali Keshavarz
- Jamshid Mashayekhi
- Reza Fayazi
- Zhaleh Olov
- Mehdi Fat'hi
- Hossein Panahi
- Ladan Mostofi

== Awards ==
The film won numerous awards at the thirteenth Fajr Film Festival:

1. Best Makeup
2. Best Set Design
3. Best Musical Score
4. Best Direction of a Second Feature Film

== See also ==
- List of Islamic films
- List of Iranian films
- Bahram Beyzai filmography
