= Ahmad Kamyabi Mask =

Iranian writer and academic (b. 1944)

Ahmad Kamyabi Mask احمد کامیابی مَسْک
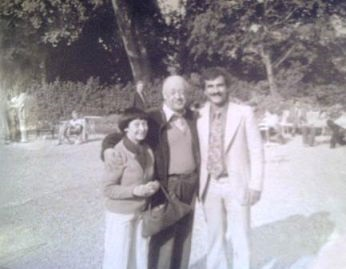
- Ahmad Kamyabi Mask and Eugène Ionesco
- Born: Ahmad Kamyabi Mask; 1944 (age 81–82); Birjand, Imperial State of Iran
- Education: University of Tehran, Paul Valéry University, Montpellier III
- Occupations: Writer; critic; publisher
- Writing career
- Language: French, Persian
- Notable awards: Association des écrivains de langue française (ADELF) Prix; 1991; Chevalier of the Order of Academic Palms; 2011

Ahmad Kamyabi Mask (Persian: احمد کامیابی مَسْک; born 1944) is a writer, translator, publisher, and current Professor Emeritus of Modern Drama and Theater of the Faculty of Fine Arts of the University of Tehran. He is a prominent scholar of French Avant-garde theater and influential in the study of Eugène Ionesco and Samuel Beckett.

== Biography ==
Ahmad Kamyabi Mask was born in Khusf, a village in the vicinity of Birjand in the east of Iran, in 1944 during the Anglo-Soviet occupation of Iran. He attended university in Mashhad, Tehran and Montpellier and taught as a school teacher. Having earned a doctorate de 3e cycle from Paul Valéry University, Montpellier III, he started as a university professor in 1978 in Tehran. He earned his doctorate d'État (state doctorate) in Comparative Literature and Theatrical Studies in 1999 and is "Professor of Humanities" since then.

Kamyabi Mask authored and translated numerous books and essays in French and Persian and self-published them in Paris and with other publishing houses and back in Iran with various publishers, notable among them the University of Tehran Press. Some of his oeuvre has been translated and published to Anglophone readership; one being his book of interviews with Beckett, Last Meeting with Samuel Beckett translated by Janet A. Evans. This book has been translated into numerous other languages as well.

He is also a prolific translator between French and Persian. He translated into Persian many of Eugène Ionesco's plays, who wrote a preface to Kamyabi Mask's Qu'a-t-on fait de Rhinocéros d'Eugène Ionesco à travers le monde?: Allemagne, France, Roumanie, Iran, Japon, U.S.A. and Ionesco et son théâtre. He also translated plays by Jean Genet and Fernando Arrabal and introduced them to Persian readership. He also translated notable Eastern and Persian works into French: a play by Bahram Bayzai, Le huitième voyage de Sindbad along with works of poetry by Buddha, Ahmad Shamlou and Shokouh Mirzadagui.

Kamyabi Mask received the 1991 award of the Association of French Language Writers for his book Qui sont les rhinocéros de Monsieur Bérenger-Eugène Ionesco?. In 2011, he was named Chevalier of the Order of Academic Palms for distinguished contribution to French literature and culture.

Ahmad Kamyabi Mask is an eminent critic of Martin Esslin for the colonialist quality of the latter's critique on French Avant-garde theater.

== Works ==
Some of Kamyabi Mask's books are:

- Kamyabi Mask, Ahmad (1987). Ionesco et son théâtre. Préface d'Eugène Ionesco suivie d'un entretien avec Ionesco. Paris: Caractères – Deuxième édition, 1992, Ed. A. Kamyabi Mask, Paris. ISBN 9782950480637.
- Kamyabi Mask, Ahmad (1990). Dernière rencontre avec Samuel Beckett. Paris: Caractères – Deuxième édition, 1995, Ed. A. Kamyabi Mask, Paris. ISBN 978-2950480651.
- Kamyabi Mask, Ahmad (1990). Qui sont les rhinocéros de Monsieur Bérenger-Eugène Ionesco? (Etude dramaturgique). suivie d'un entretien avec Jean-Louis Barrault, Préface de Bernard Laudy, Illustrations de Günther. Paris: A. Kamyabi Mask (Prix A.D.E.L.F. 1991). ISBN 9782950480606.
- Kamyabi Mask, Ahmad, ed. (1991). Qu'attendent Eugène Ionesco et Samuel Beckett? et qu'en pensent: J.-L. Barrault, J. Mauclair, M. Maréchal, P. Vernois, T. Brown, A. Grodzicki, R. Benski, A. Epstein, R. Lamont, R. Schechner? (Entretiens). Illustrations de Günther et Emeric Davis. Paris: A. Kamyabi Mask. ISBN 978-2950480620.
- Kamyabi Mask, Ahmad (1995). Qu'a-t-on fait de Rhinocéros d'Eugène Ionesco à travers le monde (Allemagne, France, Roumanie, Iran, Japon, U.S.A. ...). Préface d'Eugène Ionesco, Avant-propos et illustrations de Günther et de Taha, suivi des entretiens avec Hamid Samandarian, Ion Lucian, Karl-Heinz Stroux, William Sabatier. Paris: A. Kamyabi Mask. ISBN 978-2910337018.
- Kamyabi Mask, Ahmad (1995). A la recherche d'un ami: d'après Le petit prince d'Antoine de Saint-Exupéry (pièce en trois actes), pour les enfants de 7 à 77 ans. Paris: A. Kamyabi Mask. ISBN 9782910337025.
- Kamyabi Mask, Ahmad (1997). Histoire du Prince Nik et de la fée Golpary: pièce en deux actes d'après un conte en persan pour les enfants. Paris: A. Kamyabi Mask. ISBN 9782910337032.
- Kamyabi Mask, Ahmad (1999). Les temps de l'attente. Paris: A. Kamyabi Mask. ISBN 978-2-910337-04-9.

=== In English Translation ===
- Kamyabi Mask, Ahmad (1993). Last Meeting with Samuel Beckett. Translated by Janet A. Evans. Paris: A. Kamyabi Mask. ISBN 9782950480675.

=== Other Translations ===
- Kamyabi Mask, Ahmad (1993). Ultimo encuentro con Samuel Beckett. Translated by Roland Husson and Susana Nuñez. Paris. A. Kamyabi Mask. ISBN 9782950480682.
- Kamyabi Mask, Ahmad (1993). Laatste ontmoeting met Samuel Beckett. Translated by Nadine Proot. Paris. A. Kamyabi Mask. ISBN 9782950480699.
- Kamyabi Mask, Ahmad (1993). Letzte Begegnung mit Samuel Beckett. Translated by Gérard Siary. Paris. A. Kamyabi Mask. ISBN 9782950480668.
- Kamyabi Mask, Ahmad (1993). آخرین دیدار با ساموئل بکت، گفتگو (in Arabic). Paris: A. Kamyabi Mask. ISBN 9782950480644.
- Kamyabi Mask, Ahmad (2002). آخرین مصاحبه با ساموئل بکت. Translated by Farideh Razi. Tehran. Arvij. ISBN 964-7174-70-5.
- Kamyabi Mask, Ahmad, ed. (2002). گفتگوهایی با ساموئل بکت، اوژن یونسکو و ژان لوئی بارو درباره تئاتر. Translated by Ahmad Kamyabi Mask. Tehran. Namayesh. ISBN 964-5596-54-8.
- Kamyabi Mask, Ahmad (2003). یونسکو و تئاترش. Translated by Ahmad Kamyabi Mask. Tehran. Namayesh. ISBN 964-5596-66-1.
