= Downpour (film) =

1972 film by Bahram Bayzai

- Directed by: Bahram Bayzai
- Written by: Bahram Bayzai
- Produced by: Barbod Taheri
- Starring: Parviz Fannizadeh, Parvaneh Massoumi, Mohammad-Ali Keshavarz
- Cinematography: Mehrdad Fakhimi
- Edited by: Mehdi Rajaian
- Release date: November 1972
- Running time: 128 minutes
- Country: Iran
- Language: Persian

Downpour (Persian: رگبار, translit. Ragbār) is a 1972 Iranian black and white movie directed by Bahram Bayzai. It follows the teacher Mr. Hekmati who moves to a new town and attempts to integrate with the new environment. It focuses on his efforts to improve the school he teaches at, his relationships with others in the community and his attempts to find love.

== Plot ==
Mr. Hekmati (Parviz Fanizadeh), a new teacher at a school in the south of the city, kicks one of his students, Musayyib (Abbas Dastaranj), out of the classroom when he first enters. Musayyib's sister, Atefeh (Parvaneh Masoumi), goes to Mr. Hekmati to protest, and Hekmati expresses his interest in her. Mr. Rahim (Manouchehr Farid), the local butcher, also has a crush on Musayyib's sister. On the other hand, Mr. Modir (Mohammad Ali Keshavarz) and his wife (Parvin Soleimani) want to marry their daughter (Farkhundeh Barvar) to Mr. Hekmati; but Hekmati does not pay attention to the director's daughter. To fill his free time, Hekmati decides to renovate the school's dilapidated and abandoned theater alone. Mr. Rahim threatens him several times to get Mr. Hekmati out of the love arena, but Hekmati's relationship with Atefeh deepens. The school's theater opens with a theatrical program, after which the order to transfer Hekmati is communicated to him, and he is forced to leave the school and the neighborhood.

== Cast ==
- Parviz Fannizadeh – Hekmati
- Parvaneh Massoumi – Atefeh
- Mohammad-Ali Keshavarz – Nazem
- Manuchehr Farid – Rahim

== About the film ==
Although the film circulated in various VHS and digital formats, mostly in poor quality, the only known surviving original copy of the film was a positive print with English subtitles in possession of the film maker; badly damaged with scratches, perforation tears and mid-frame splices. Restoration required a considerable amount of both physical and digital repair.

Restored in 2011 by Cineteca di Bologna/L'Immagine Ritrovata laboratory, in association with The Film Foundation's World Cinema Project and Bahram Beyzai, the film drew quite some international attention and was shown in Italy and the US. Martin Scorsese remarked:

I'm very proud that the World Cinema Foundation has restored this wise and beautiful film, the first feature from its director Bahram Bayzaie. The tone puts me in mind of what I love best in the Italian neorealist pictures, and the story has the beauty of an ancient fable – you can feel Bayzaie's background in Persian literature, theater and poetry. Bayzaie never received the support he deserved from the government of his home country – he now lives in California – and it's painful to think that this extraordinary film, once so popular in Iran, was on the verge of disappearing forever. The original negative has been either impounded or destroyed by the Iranian government, and all that remained was one 35mm print with English subtitles burned in. Now, audiences all over the world will be able to see this remarkable picture.

And Bahram Beyzai noted about his revisionist attitude that,

During Downpour, the equations of commercial and intellectual films were the same. The common morality of the action/drama films of the commercial cinema had a tone of political ideology and social activism. The intellectual films were praised for communicating with the mass culture. In that sense, I don't want to be popular. Many of these (popular) moralities, in my opinion, are wrong and we are all victims of them. So, I have betrayed my people if I endorse them. I have deviated from the morals of the political parties, hence they have labeled me (inaccessible), not the people. At the heart of my harsh expression, there is a love and respect, for the people, that does not exist in superficial appraisals of the masses. ... my audiences are those who strive to go one step further, not those who are the guardians of the old equations nor those who dread self-examination and self-reflexivity.
