= Onelight Theatre =

Canadian theatre company

OneLight Theatre is a professional theatre company, based in Halifax, Nova Scotia, whose primary function is to develop and produce new plays. In addition to its artistic work, OneLight Theatre also hosts conferences related to theatre arts, participates actively in professional organizations, and mentors emerging professional artists through the Firestarter program.

== Structure of the organization ==
=== Structure of the Company ===
The structure of the organization is intended to permit the effective management of the company and its artistic projects. The OneLight staff has been working together since 1999 and consists of Artistic Director Shahin Sayadi; Managing Director Maggie Stewart; and Technical Director and Administrator Jake Dambergs. The company engages, on a contract basis, artists, musicians, designers and publicists, as required, for projects, and also has an accountant for ongoing support with budgeting and accounting. OneLight Theatre Society has a Board of Directors, which has five member, and standing committees for recruiting and fundraising which are chaired by Board members.

=== Brief history ===
==== 1999 ====
- The core members of the company begin working together

==== 2002 ====
- OneLight Theatre Society is incorporated

==== 2004 ====
- PACT (affiliate member)
- Forum 2004: Theatre in Nova Scotia: Yesterday, Today, Tomorrow

==== 2005 ====
- Heritage Canada: CAHSP grant for Strategic Planning and Board Governance
- Forum 2005: The Canadian Theatre Identity Crisis
- Membership in Playwrights Atlantic Resource Centre (PARC)

==== 2006 ====
- Canada Council Extended Project Grant (The Veil)
- PACT- full member, OneLight signs into the Canadian Theatre Agreement (CTA)
- Canada Council Capacity Building Grant / Stand Firm program
- Shahin Sayadi attends the Playwrights Workshop Montreal retreat at Tadoussac
- Firestarter program launched
- Operating support from the province

==== 2007 ====
- Canada Council Capacity Building Grant / Stand Firm program
- Shahin Sayadi attends Banff Playwrights Colony
- Firestarter mentoring participant, Shauntay Grant, selected and will begin work in Fall 2007

=== Productions ===
From 2002 to 2005, OneLight Theatre had its own performance space, The Crib, on Gottingen Street, and developed and presented five plays there. In 2006 the theatre moved to a downtown office space at 1590 Argyle Street. In 2005 it produced Death of Yazdgerd at the Neptune Studio Stage, and later toured this play to the Firehall Arts Centre in Vancouver.

In 2006, Onelight was one of five organizations in Canada to be granted a Canada Council for the Arts extended project grant to develop a new play. In the subsequent 18 months, Onelight along with Neptune Theatre and the Mermaid Theatre of Nova Scotia developed this new play, The Veil. The Veil was scheduled to debut at Neptune’s Studio and then tour to the Harbourfront Studio Theatre in Toronto.

==== 1999 ====
- The Bacchae (The Crib)

==== 2002 ====
- Medea (The Crib)

==== 2003 ====
- Woyczeck (The Crib)
- Lady MacPunch (The Crib)

==== 2004 ====
- Josette (The Crib)

==== 2005 ====
- My Own True Love: WAR (The Crib)
- Death of Yazdgerd (Neptune Studio; Firehall Arts Centre, Vancouver)

==== 2007 ====
- The Veil: The Story of Khanoom (Neptune Studio; Harbourfront Centre, Toronto)
