= Theatre in Iran (Beyzai) =

Book by Bahram Bayzai

- Author: Bahram Beyzai
- Original title: نمایش در ایران
- Language: Persian
- Genre: historical research
- Publisher: The writer, later Roshangaran Publishing
- Publication date: 1965
- Publication place: Iran
- Media type: Print (Paperback)
- Pages: 242 pp
- ISBN: 9789646751095

Theatre in Iran (Persian: نمایش در ایران), sometimes also translated as A Study on Iranian Theatre, is a research work by Bahram Beyzai on theater in the Persian world from the ancient times to the twentieth century, published in 1965. It has been described as "the definitive work on the history of Persian theatre."

== The text ==
The chapters of the book were published as articles in advance, i.e. 1962 and 1963. In 1965 the writer published them as namayesh dar Iran (literally meaning "Theatre in Iran") with the English title of A Study on Iranian Theatre on the back cover. The book became and stayed to be the major contribution in the field. Later, its publication was entrusted to Roshangaran Publishing, which came to be Beyzai's exclusive Persian publisher.

== In other languages ==
- Beyzaì, Bahram. Storia del teatro in Iran. tr. Mani Naimi. Seattle. 2020. ISBN 978-1-6591-1569-7
