= The Stranger and the Fog =

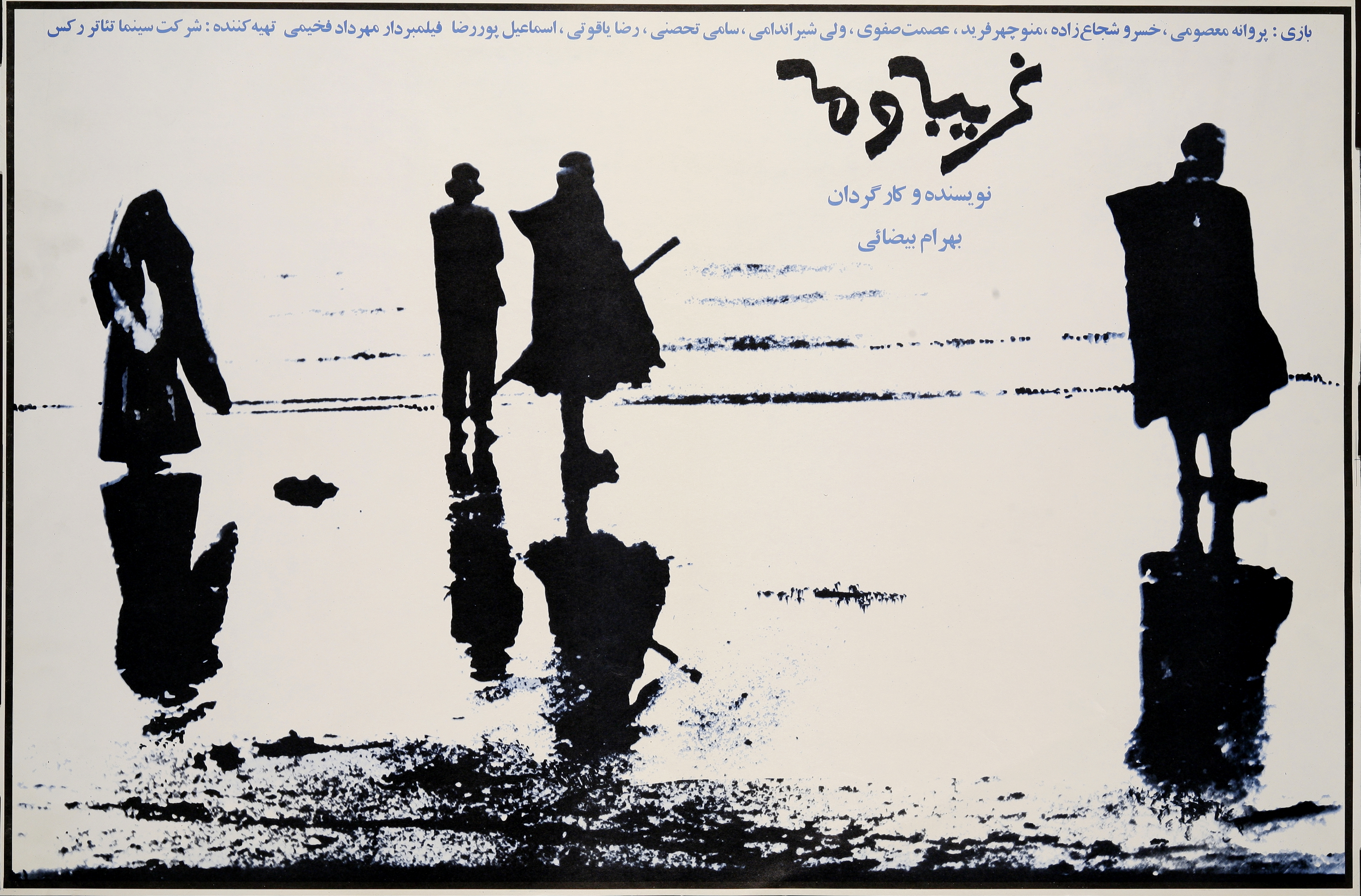
- Film poster
- Directed by: Bahram Beyzai
- Written by: Bahram Beyzai
- Produced by: Mohammad Taghi Shokraee
- Starring: Khosrow Shoja'zadeh; Parvaneh Massoumi; Manuchehr Farid; Esmat Safavi; Vali Shirandami; Sami Tahassoni; Reza Yaghouti; Esmail Pourreza
- Cinematography: Mehrdad Fakhimi; Parviz Malekzadeh; Firouz Malekzadeh
- Edited by: Bahram Beyzai
- Production companies: Rex Cinema & Theatre Company; Compagnie de Cinema
- Release dates: 1 December 1974 (1974 Tehran International Film Festival); 18 October 1976 (TIFF); 30 September 2023 (NYFF (restored))
- Running time: 140 minutes
- Country: Iran
- Language: Persian

The Stranger and the Fog (Persian: غریبه و مه, romanized: Gharibe va meh) is a 1974 Iranian period drama film written and directed by Bahram Beyzai. The peaceful lives of the people in a village are disrupted when a mysterious, suspicious man with no memory appears in a boat. It stars Khosrow Shoja'zadeh, Parvaneh Massoumi, Manuchehr Farid, Esmat Safavi, Vali Shirandami, Sami Tahassoni, Reza Yaghouti, and Esmail Pourreza.

In 2023, the film was restored in 4K by Janus Films and Martin Scorsese's The Film Foundation. The restored version premiered at the New York Film Festival and the BFI London Film Festival.

== Plot ==
In a remote seaside village, the peaceful lives of the residents are upended when they spot a mysterious boat drifting toward the shore. Upon pulling it in, they find a weary and wounded stranger named Ayat, who has no memory of how he got there. He only recalls being attacked and barely escaping with his life. As Ayat tries to rebuild his sense of self and uncover the truth about his past, he becomes a source of curiosity and suspicion in the community.

== Cast ==
- Khosrow Shoja'zadeh as Ayat
- Parvaneh Massoumi as Ra'na
- Manuchehr Farid
- Esmat Safavi
- Vali Shirandami
- Sami Tahassoni
- Reza Yaghouti
- Esmail Pourreza
- Mohammad Poursattar
- Ali Zhakan
- Hamid Ta'ati
- Iraj Raminfar
- Majid Mozaffari
- Mohsen Mahammadbagher
- Parviz Mehram
- Mehdi Bahmanpour as Ra'na's husband
- Ghasem Pourshakiba
- Mehdi Montazer
- Morteza Soroush
