= Donya Fannizadeh =

Iranian puppeteer

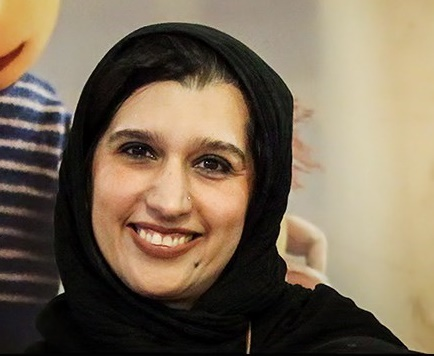
- Born: November 11, 1967; Tehran, Iran
- Died: December 28, 2016 (aged 49); Tehran, Iran
- Occupation: Puppeteer
- Notable work: "Kolah Ghermezi"
- Spouse: Abtin Sahami
- Children: 2 sons
- Father: Parviz Fannizadeh

Donya Fannizadeh (Persian: دنیا فنی‌زاده; November 11, 1967 – December 28, 2016) was an Iranian puppeteer, best known for her act with Kolah Ghermezi, her puppet since 1995.

Fannizadeh began her career with the TV puppet series Umbrella with the Song of Rain in 1985 and then collaborated in other TV puppet series including The Curious Little Raven, The Goat with a Bell Foot, Hadi and Hoda, Aunt Spider and Salty Mouse. Her father, Parviz Fannizadeh was an Iranian actor, film and television star.

== Death ==
Fannizadeh died of cancer on December 28, 2016, at the age of 49 at Day Hospital in Tehran.
