= Memoirs of the Actor in a Supporting Role =

- front cover of the English edition (2010)
- Original language: Persian
- Written by: Bahram Beyzai
- Characters: Mowhebat; Zolfaqar; Ms. Meshkin; Zarrin; Maher; Khadang; Davalpa; Belqeys; Majnun; Questioners, Landlords, Passers-by, Policemen, etc.
- Setting: Tehran during the 1979 revolution of Iran

Premiere
- Date: 2003
- Place: Sanglaj Theatre, Tehran

Memoirs of the Actor in a Supporting Role (Persian: خاطرات هنرپیشهٔ نقش دوم, romanized: khaterat-e honarpishe-ye naqsh-e dovvom) is a 1982 play by Bahram Beyzai.

== Plot ==
The play recounts the urban adventures of two male villagers (named Mowhebat and Zolfaqar) in Tehran during the earlier stages of street demonstrations in the 1979 revolution. Driven by drought and indigence, the two arrive in the large city in the latter months of the shah's rule in order to seek employment. They end up as hirelings in large crowds of mercenary vagabonds demonstrating against revolutionaries. Each day they dress up as workers, party members, students, parents of demonstrating students protesting against their own rebellious children, etc. Their unwittingly reactionary occupation in troubled times adds up to catastrophic consequences.

== Text ==
The play was written in 1982 and first published in the spring of 1983 by Damavand Publishing House; which has been its only licensed publication in Persian. In 2010 it was published in the United States in Mohammad Reza Ghanoonparvar's English translation.

== Performance ==
The play has never been directed and produced by the playwright. Yet, other notable performances include the 2003 autumn production in Tehran directed by Hadi Marzban with a cast of 42 and with Farzaneh Kaboli in one of the leading roles.

== In Other Languages ==
The play was translated into English by M.R. Ghanoonparvar and published in 2010 in the United States:

- Memoirs of the Actor in a Supporting Role: A Play by Bahram Beyzai (2010)
