= Death of Yazdgerd =

1979 Persian play

- Original language: Persian
- Written by: Bahram Beyzai
- Characters: Miller; Miller's wife Priest; General
- Setting: Muslim conquest of Persia

Premiere
- Date: 10 September 1979
- Place: City Theater of Tehran; Tehran, Iran

Death of Yazdgerd (or alternatively translated as Death of the King; and whose original subtitle translates "Regicide"; Persian: مرگ یزدگرد) is a Persian play about the death of Yazdegerd III by Bahram Beyzai, often considered his magnum opus, which he adapted into a film of the same name.

== Text ==
=== In English ===
The play was translated into English by Manuchehr Anvar and published in Tehran. Another English translation is named Death of the King, published in Stories from the Rains of Love and Death: Four Plays from Iran in Canada.

== Notable productions ==
=== Premiere ===
Beyzai produced this play for the first time in the City Theater of Tehran from 10 September 1979 to 29 October. Susan Taslimi and Mehdi Hashemi played the leading roles.

=== English premiere ===
Onelight Theatre produced this play in Canada in 2005.

=== Bengali premiere ===
Sudipto Chatterjee translated and produced this play in India in 2014.
