= Death of Yazdgerd (film) =

- Directed by: Bahram Beyzai
- Screenplay by: Bahram Beyzai
- Based on: Death of Yazdgerd (theater play)
- Starring: Susan Taslimi; Mehdi Hashemi; Mahmoud Behrouzian; Amin Tarokh; Karim Akbari Mobarakeh; Yasaman Arami
- Cinematography: Mehrdad Fakhimi
- Music by: Babak Bayat
- Release date: 1982
- Running time: 120 minutes
- Country: Iran
- Language: Persian

Death of Yazdgerd (Persian: مرگ یزدگرد, Marg-e Yazdgerd) is a 1982 Iranian drama film by Bahram Beyzai based on the play of the same name.

== Plot ==
The story of the film is based on the murder of Yazdgerd III, the last emperor of Sasanian Persia, who while being hard pressed by the Arabs on his western flank, fled to Marv where he was slain by a miller in a mill, in which he had been taking refuge.

The film begins with the Zoroastrian high priest (magus) of the Persian Empire, accompanied by the imperial army commander entering the mill to try the miller accused of murdering the emperor. The miller, his wife and his daughter, while trying to exculpate themselves, all express a different version of the same incident. As the story shifts, more questions come up than are answered.

== Book ==
The play was translated into English by Manuchehr Anvar and published in Tehran. Another English translation is named Death of the King, published in Stories from the Rains of Love and Death: Four Plays from Iran in Canada.

== Cast ==
- Susan Taslimi as the miller's wife (زن آسیابان; zan-e āsiābān)
- Mehdi Hashemi as the miller (آسیابان; āsiābān)
- Mahmoud Behrouzian as the priest (موبد; mobad)
- Amin Tarokh as the general (سردار اسپهبد; sardār spāhbed)
- Karim Akbari Mobarakeh as the army chief (سرکرده; sarkarde)
- Yasaman Arami as the miller's daughter (دختر; doxtar)
- Ali Reza Khamseh as the soldier (سرباز; sarbāz)
