= Bashu, the Little Stranger =

1989 film by Bahram Bayzai

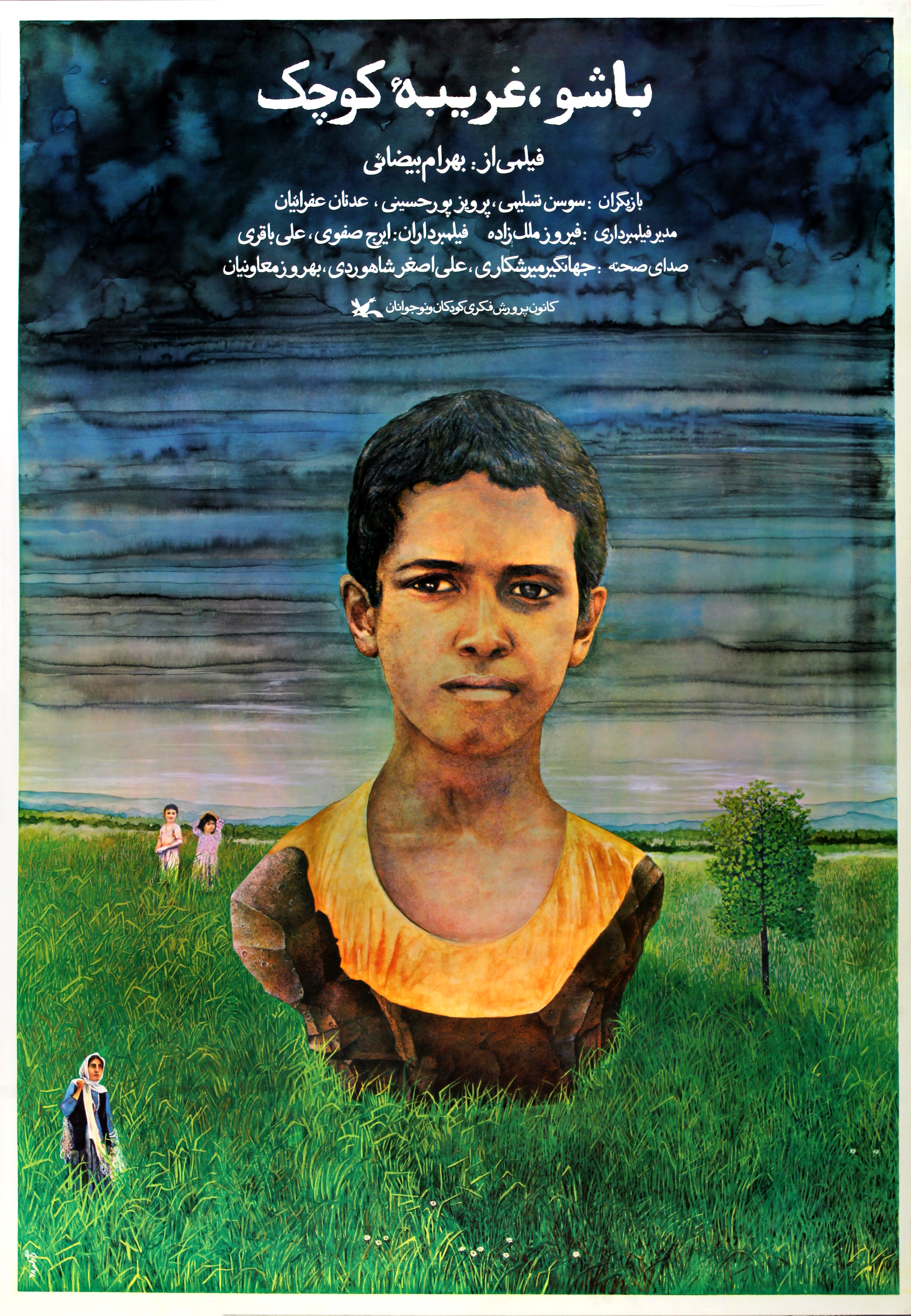
- Theatrical release poster
- Directed by: Bahram Beizai
- Written by: Bahram Beizai
- Starring: Susan Taslimi
- Cinematography: Firooz Malekzadeh
- Release date: 1 February 1989 (Fajr Film Festival)
- Running time: 120 minutes
- Country: Iran
- Languages: Gilaki; Persian; Khuzestani Arabic

Bashu, the Little Stranger (Persian: باشو غریبه کوچک, romanized: Bashu, Gharibeye Koochak), is a 1986 Iranian drama film directed by Bahram Beizai. The film was produced in 1986, and was released in 1989. This multi-ethnic film was the first Iranian film to make use of Gilaki, a northern language of Iran, in a serious context rather than comic relief. Susan Taslimi playing the main character, Naii, is a Gilak herself. The cast included Farrokhlagha Houshmand (playing the sister in law).

The Institute for Intellectual Development of Children and Young Adults (IIDCYA) helped produce the film. Bashu, the Little Stranger was voted the "Best Iranian Film of all time" in November 1999 by a Persian movie magazine "Picture world" poll of 150 Iranian critics and professionals.

== Plot ==
The film is about a young Afro-Iranian Arab boy from Khuzestan province, in the south of Iran, during the Iran–Iraq War. His parents are killed in a bombing raid on his home village and he escapes on a cargo truck to a very different region in the Caspian north of the country. Eventually he gets off and finds refuge on the farm of a Gilak woman, Na'i, who has two young children of her own. Initially, Na'i tries to shoo Bashu away, but later takes pity on him and leaves food out for him. Although Na'i is initially ambivalent toward Bashu, and he is initially suspicious of her, they come to trust one another, and Bashu becomes a member of the family, even calling Na'i "mom". Being that Bashu speaks Arabic, while Na'i and her children speak Gilaki, they have trouble communicating with each other, although Bashu is able to speak and read Persian (for example in the scene where he picks up the school textbook, reading a passage from it in an attempt to appease the children fighting). In a gesture of reciprocation and perhaps love, Bashu cares for Na'i when she falls ill, as she had done for him, crying for her and beating a drum in prayer.

Throughout the film, Na'i maintains correspondence with her husband, a war veteran looking for employment, who has been gone for quite some time. She tells him about Bashu, and implores him to return home in time to help with the harvest. Bashu becomes Na'i's helper on the farm, and even accompanies her to the bazaar to sell her goods. Throughout the film, Bashu experiences post-traumatic stress disorder and sees visions of his dead family members, which cause him to wander off. Ultimately, however, he and Na'i are always reunited.

The other adults in the village harangue Na'i about taking Bashu in, often deriding his dark skin and different language, making comments about washing the dark off of his skin. In addition to the village adults, the school-age children taunt and beat Bashu, although the children prove ultimately to be more willing to accept Bashu than the adults. In one scene in which he is being taunted, Bashu picks up a school book and to everybody's surprise, reads aloud a passage stating "We are all the children of Iran" in the Persian language, which is taught in all schools throughout the country. Before this point, the children had assumed Bashu to be either mute or stupid.

In the end, Na'i's husband (played by Parviz Poorhosseini) returns home with no money and missing an arm, having been forced to take on dangerous work that is never identified. He and Na'i argue over her having kept Bashu against his wishes. Bashu comes to her defense, challenging the strange man to identify himself. Na'i's husband tells Bashu that he is his father. Bashu offers to shake hands, before noticing his missed arm. The two bond over their losses and embrace as though they were always a part of the same family. The film ends with the entire family, including children, running into the farm field, making loud noises together to scare away a troublesome boar.

== See also ==
- List of Iranian films
- List of films considered the best
