= Mohammad-Reza Darvishi =

- محمدرضا درویشی
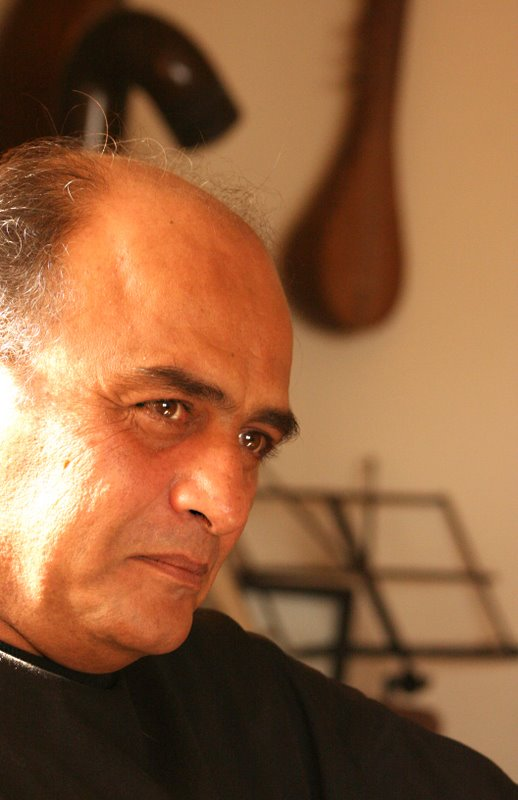
- Born: 17 October 1955; Shiraz, Iran
- Citizenship: Iran
- Education: Faculty of Fine Arts, University of Tehran (1974–1978)
- Occupations: musician, researcher

Signature
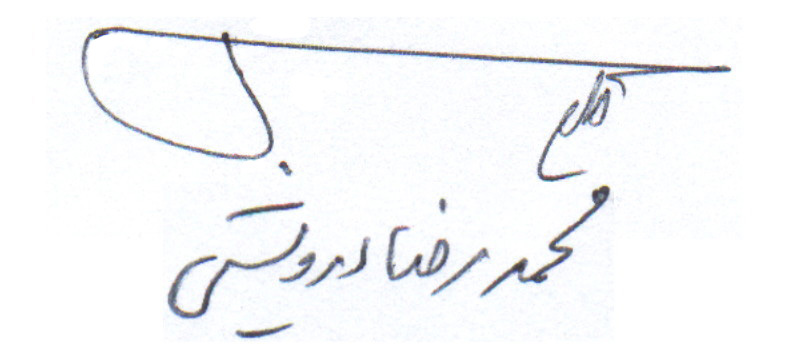

Mohammad-Reza Darvishi (Persian: محمدرضا درویشی; born 17 October 1955 in Shiraz) is an Iranian musician, researcher, and author of Encyclopedia of the Musical Instruments of Iran, a Klaus P. Wachsmann Prize-winner book about Iranian musical instruments.

== Works ==
=== Music ===
==== Film music ====
A selection of M. R. Darvishi's film scores

- 2012 Parinaz
- 2009 Mizak (meaning: My mother)
- 2009 The White Meadows (Persian: Keshtzārhā-ye sepid)
- 2009 When we are all Asleep (Persian: Vaqti hame xābim)
- 2008 The green fire (Persian: Ātash-e sabz)
- 2008 Lady of the Roses (documentary)
- 2006 Crossing the Dust
- 2006 Slowly... (Persian: Be ahestegi...)
- 2006 The Talking Carpet (Persian: Qali-e soxangu) (documentary short)
- 2004 Stray Dogs
- 2003 Joy of Madness (documentary)
- 2003 Two Angels
- 2003 Osama
- 2003 At Five in the Afternoon
- 2002 11'09"01 September 11(segment "Iran")
- 2002 The Afghan Alphabeth (Persian: Alefba-ye Afqān) (documentary)
- 2001 Kandahar (Persian: Safar-e Qandehār)
- 2001 The Unfinished Song
- 2000 The Day I Became a Woman (Persian: Ruzi ke zan shodam)
- 2000 Blackboards (Persian: Taxt-e siyāh)
- 1998 A Bag of Rice (Persian: Kise-ye berenj)

==== Music for theatre plays ====
- 2003 Shab-e hezār-o-yekom (The One Thousand and First Night)
- 2004 Afrā yā Ruz migozarad (Afra, or the day passes)
- 2005 Majles-e shabih. Dar zekr-e masāyeb-e ostād Navid Mākān va hamsarash mohandes-e Roxshid-e Farzin (Mourning Play. About the Sufferings of Professor Navid Makan and his Wife, architect Rokhshid Farzin)

==== Tapes and CDs ====
Some of his Cassettes and CDs are:

- In the memory of Eqbāl (Prelude for piano). Tehrān: Harp, 1984
- Morning Melody (Trio for 2 clarinets and piano). Tehrān: Arvin, 1997
- Abdolqāder Marāqi, Shouqnāme
- Mazandarani Music, for song and orchestra, song by Abolhassan Khoshroo and Nourolah Alizadeh, 1983
- Winter, for song and symphonic orchestra, song by Shahram Nazeri
- The season of flower, for song and symphonic orchestra, song by Iraj Bastami
- The aster dome, for song and orchestra, sung by Mohammad Reza Shajariyan (a joint work with Parviz Meshkatian)
- The soul of the lovers, for song and orchestra, sung by Mohammad Reza Shajariyan (a joint work with Parviz Meshkatian)
- Music album of seven thrones (A collection of 4 cassettes from the music of Iran regions along with the book)
- Music album of north of Khorasan (A collection of 3 cassettes from the music of north of Khorasan along with the book)
- Mirror and song, music album (A collection of 28 cassettes with the melody and religious music from various regions of Iran with the book)
- Bag of rice: Music from the movies: “Bag of rice”, “The song of the Nimvar Field” and “Karde”, 1999
- Music from the movies: “The Blackboard” & “The day I became a woman”, 2001
- Zaman = Era, 2019

=== Selected bibliography ===
- (1984) Bist tarāne-ye mahalli-ye Fārs (Twenty traditional songs from Fars). Tehrān: Harp; later: Mahoor: 1994
- (1991) Haft ourang (Seven throne - a collection of articles on regional music of Iran). Tehrān: Art Center
- (1994) Negāh be qarb : bahsi dar ta'sir-e musiqi-ye Qarb bar musiqi-ye Irān (Westward look : a discussion on the impact of Western music on the (sic) Iranian music : an analytical survey). Tehrān: Māhoor
- (1994) Sonnat va bigānegi-ye farhang dar musiqi-ye Irān (Tradition and cultural alienation in music of Iran). Tehran: Māhur
- (1994) Moqaddamei bar shenāxt-e musiqi-ye navāhi-ye Irān. Daftar-e naxost: Manāteq-e jonub (Hormozgān, Khuzestān) (An introduction presentation of regional music from Irān. First book: Hormozgan, Boushehr, Khouzestan). Tehrān: Māhur
- (1994) Dar bāre-ye honar va adabiyāt (About art and literature; Mohammad Reza Darvishi in conversation with Naser Hariri). Tehrān: Āvishan, Gouharzād
- (1997) Nourouzxāni (Norouz Singing - Songs for Nouruz and Spring from various regions of Iran). Tehrān: Arvin, 62 p.
- (1998) Āiine va āvāz (Mirror and awaz singing; a collection of articles about the traditional music of Iran from various regions). Tehrān: Art Center
- (1999) Musiqi va xalse : zekrhā-ye marāsem-e Gowāti-ye Baluchestān (Music and Trance: The Govati ceremony citations of Balochistan). Tehrān: Māhour, 55 p.
- (2001) Az miyān-e sorudhā va sokuthā : gozide-ye neweshtār wa goftār-e... (From among song and silence : a selection from the writings and lectures of...). Tehrān: Māhur, 296 p.
- (2001) Dāyerat’ol-ma’āref-e sāzhā-ye Irān. Jeld 1: Sāzhā-ye zehi-ye mezrābi va ārshei-ye navāhi-ye Irān = Encyclopedia of the Musical Instruments of Iran. Vol. 1. Chordophones in Regional Music. Tehrān: Māhoor
- (2005) Dāyerat’ol-ma’āref-e sāzhā-ye Irān. Jeld 2: Pustsedāhā va xodsedāhā-ye navāhi-ye Irān = Encyclopedia of the Musical Instruments of Iran. Vol. 2. Membranophones and Idiophones of Regional Music. Tehrān: Māhoor
- (2009) Sāzshenāsi-ye irāni (Acquaintance with Iranian musical instruments). Tehān, 256 p. - together with Arfa' Atrāii
- Goftegu bā Mohammad Rezā Darvishi dar bāre-ye musiqi-ye Irān (Conversation with Mohammad Reza Darvishi about Iranian music)
- Jāmedarān : selsele-ye mu-ye dust
- Leyli kojāst : ta'amolāt-e kutāh wa parākande dar musiqi va farhang (Where is Leyli : Brief and dispersed reflections on music and culture)
- Musiqi-ye hamāsi-ye Irān : gozide-ye maqālāt (Epic music of Iran : selected articles). (ed.)
- Mousum-Gol

== Awards ==
- October 2002 - SEM’s (Society for Ethnomusicology) award for the best publication of the year on musical instruments, granted by Bruno Nettl, for The Encyclopaedia of the Iranina Musical Instruments, vol.1
- 2000, The music for Kandahar (2001 film) (directed by Mohsen Makhmalbaf) was nominated the best foreign film music, among the others, by Bonn biennial festival of film music, Germany.
- 2005, Nomination for achievement of UNESCO’s award for the greatest musician worldwide.

== Films about Darvishi ==
- Leyli kojast, directed by Mohammad Shirvani, a documentary about Darvishi’s professional career on the occasion of his 2005 nomination for the UNESCO’s award for the greatest musician worldwide.
