= Parviz Fannizadeh =

Iranian actor

- پرویز فنی‌زاده
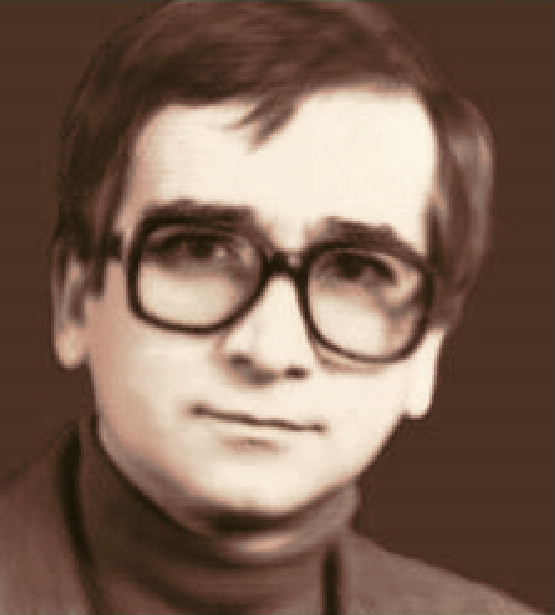
- Fannizadeh in 1970s
- Born: Parviz Fannizadeh; January 27, 1938; Tehran, Iran
- Died: February 24, 1980 (aged 42); Tehran, Iran
- Occupation: Actor
- Years active: 1960–1980
- Spouse: Hayedeh Ghayoori
- Children: 2, including Donya

Parviz Fannizadeh (Persian: پرویز فنی‌زاده; January 27, 1938 – February 24, 1980) was an Iranian film and television actor. He was one of Iran's first method actors. Fannizadeh is best known for his roles as "Mash Ghaasem" in My Uncle Napoleon (aka Daii jan Napelon) and "Hekmati" in Downpour.

== Career ==
Fannizadeh was born and raised in Tehran. He had a passion for acting and started his career at an early age. He graduated from the Iranian Academy of the Dramatic Arts in 1961. In 1966 he played his first role. He won the best actor prize at the Fifth Iranian National Film Festival "Sepas" in 1973 for portraying Mr. Hekmati in Bahram Bayzai's film Downpour (Ragbar) (1972). He acted in several plays on theatre stage including plays directed by Hamid Samandarian.

== Death ==
In 1980 he was found dead at the age of 42 at his home in Tehran.

== Family ==
He had two daughters, Donya and Hasti. Donya Fannizadeh died of cancer on December 28, 2016 at the age of 49 at Day Hospital in Tehran.

== Filmography ==
- Sorkhpustha (1979)
- Ghadeghan (1978)
- Daii jan Napelon (1976) as Mash Ghasem, directed by Nasser Taghvai
- Gavaznha (The Deer) (1976), directed by Masoud Kimiai
- Sham-e akhar (The Last Supper) (1976), directed by Shahyar Ghanbari
- Boof-e koor (The Blind Owl) (1975), directed by Kioumars Derambakhsh
- Soltan-e Sahebgharan (1974) (mini) TV Series .... as Malijak, directed by Ali Hatami
- Tangsir (1974), directed by Amir Naderi
- Gharibe (1972), directed by Shapoor Gharib
- Ragbar (Downpour) (1971) as Mr. Hekmati, directed by Bahram Bayzai
- Gāv (The Cow) (1969), directed by Dariush Mehrjui
- Khesht va Ayeneh (1966), directed by Ebrahim Golestan

== Theatre ==
Few of his works as an actor on theatre stage:

- Morts sans sépulture, Jean-Paul Sartre, directed by Hamid Samandarian, 1964 and 1979
- The Glass Menagerie, Tennessee Williams, directed by Hamid Samandarian, 1964
- The Doctor in Spite of Himself, Molière, directed by Hamid Samandarian, 1965
- Sei personaggi in cerca d'autore, Luigi Pirandello, directed by Pari Saberi, co-starring Forough Farrokhzad
