= Ballad of Tara =

1979 film

- Film poster
- Directed by: Bahram Bayzai
- Written by: Bahram Bayzai
- Produced by: Bahram Bayzai
- Starring: Susan Taslimi
- Cinematography: Mehrdad Fakhimi
- Edited by: Bahram Bayzai
- Release date: May 1979
- Country: Iran
- Language: Persian

Ballad of Tara (Persian: چریکه تارا, romanized: Tcherike-ye Tara, lit. 'Ballad of Tara') is a 1979 Iranian film written as well as directed by Bahram Bayzai. It was presented in the Un Certain Regard section at the 1980 Cannes Film Festival.

== Plot ==
Tara is a young widow who lives with her two children in a remote coastal Iranian village. After the death of her grandfather, Tara discovers an ancient sword among his belongings. However, when she attempts to use it, a mysterious "Unknown Soldier" from a long-vanished clan appears from the sea to reclaim the weapon. As the narrative blurs the lines between the contemporary world and Persian myth, Tara finds herself drawn into a supernatural romance with the warrior, who can only find rest if he is acknowledged by a living woman. While facing the mundane pressures of village life and persistent suitors, Tara eventually follows the soldier into his spectral realm, symbolizing a deep immersion into national heritage and the collective subconscious.

== Cast ==
- Susan Taslimi - Tara
- Manuchehr Farid - Historical man
- Reza Babak - Ghalich
- Siamak Atlassi - Ashoob
- Mahin Deyham - Neighbor's wife
- Mohammad Poursattar
- Sami Tahasuni
- Reza Fayazi - Neighbour
- Sirus Hassanpur
