= Killing Mad Dogs =

2001 film by Bahram Bayzai

- Directed by: Bahram Bayzai
- Starring: Mojdeh Shamsaie; Majid Mozaffari; Reza Kianian
- Release date: 7 February 2001
- Running time: 135 minutes
- Country: Iran
- Language: Persian

Killing Mad Dogs (Persian: سگ كشی, romanized: Sagkoshi) is a 2001 Iranian drama film directed by Bahram Bayzai.

== Plot ==
A businessman in late-1980s Tehran, Nasser Moasser, discovers that his partner has been laundering money and flees the city with the police on his trail. One year later, his wife, Golrokh Kamali, returns from a long absence to find that her husband is gone and that she has been left to resolve his many debts. Eventually, she meets with her husband's old partner, Javad Moghadam, and learns the truth about his disappearance.

== Cast ==
- Mojdeh Shamsaie - Golrokh
- Majid Mozaffari - Nasser Moasser
- Reza Kianian - Javad Moghadam
- Dariush Arjmand - Hajji Naghdi
- Ahmad Najafi - Tayeri
- Mitra Hajjar - Fereshteh
- Hasan Pourshirazi
