= M. R. Ghanoonparvar =

Mohammad Reza Ghanoonparvar (Persian: محمدرضا قانون‌پرور) is a Professor Emeritus of Persian and Comparative Literature at the Faculty of Middle Eastern Studies at the University of Texas, Austin, whose expertise includes the works of Simin Daneshvar, Sadeq Chubak, and Sadeq Hedayat.

== Background ==
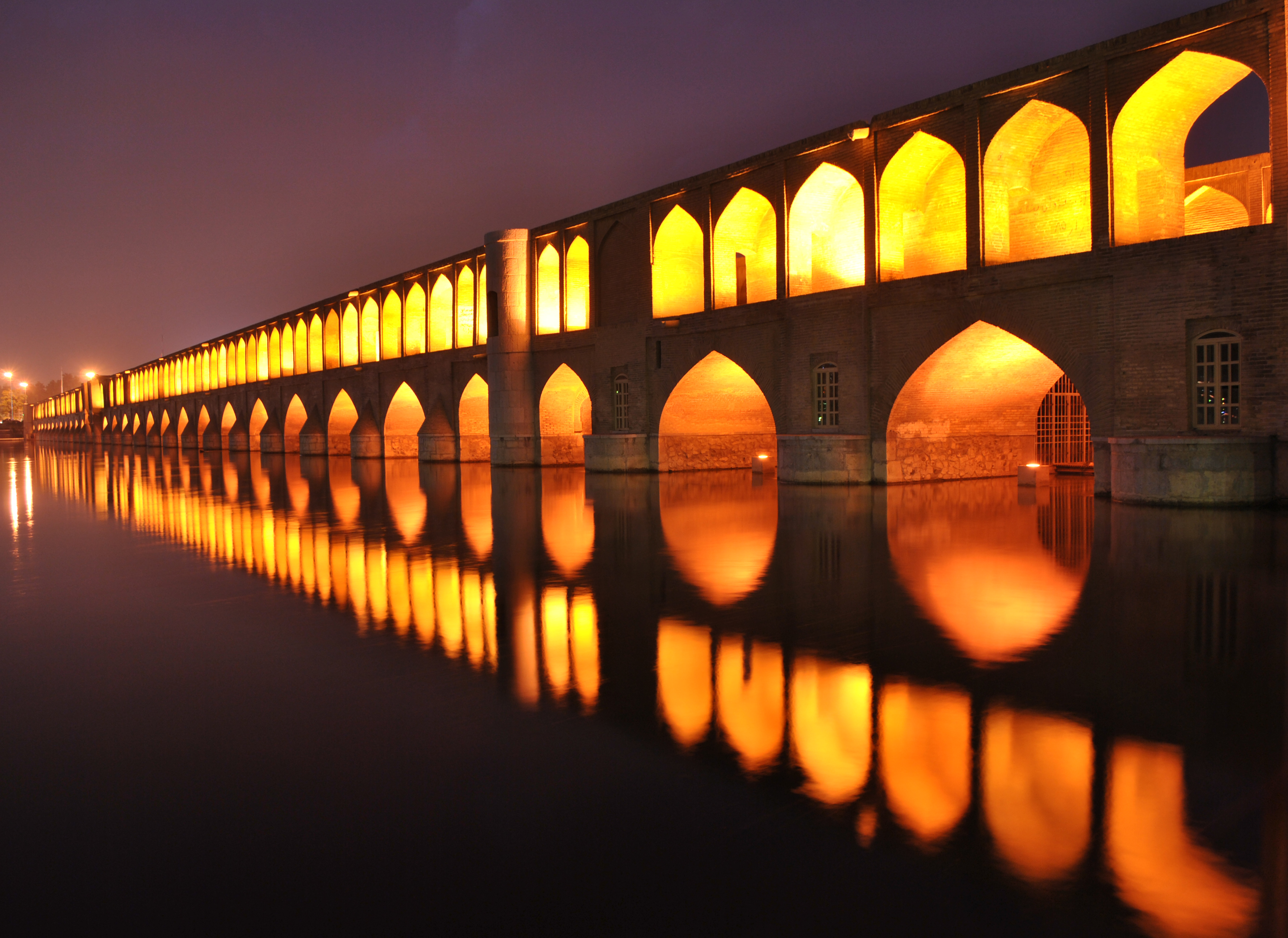
Ghanoonparvar comes from Isfahan, home of Si-o-se Pol

Mohammad Reza Ghanoonparvar grew up in Isfahan, Iran.

In 1966, he received a BA in English Language and Literature from the University of Isfahan. Later that year, he received a German Language Proficiency Certificate from the Goethe Institute in Germany and then studied English Literature and Sociology at the University of Heidelberg through 1967. Coming to the USA later that year, he studied Foreign Language Teaching at Saint Michael's College in Winooski, Vermont. He went on to English Literature and Linguistics at North Texas State University in Denton, Texas through 1970. In 1972, he earned an MA in English Literature from Eastern Michigan University in Ypsilanti, Michigan. In 1979, he earned a PhD in Comparative Literature (Persian and English) at the University of Texas at Austin.

== Career ==
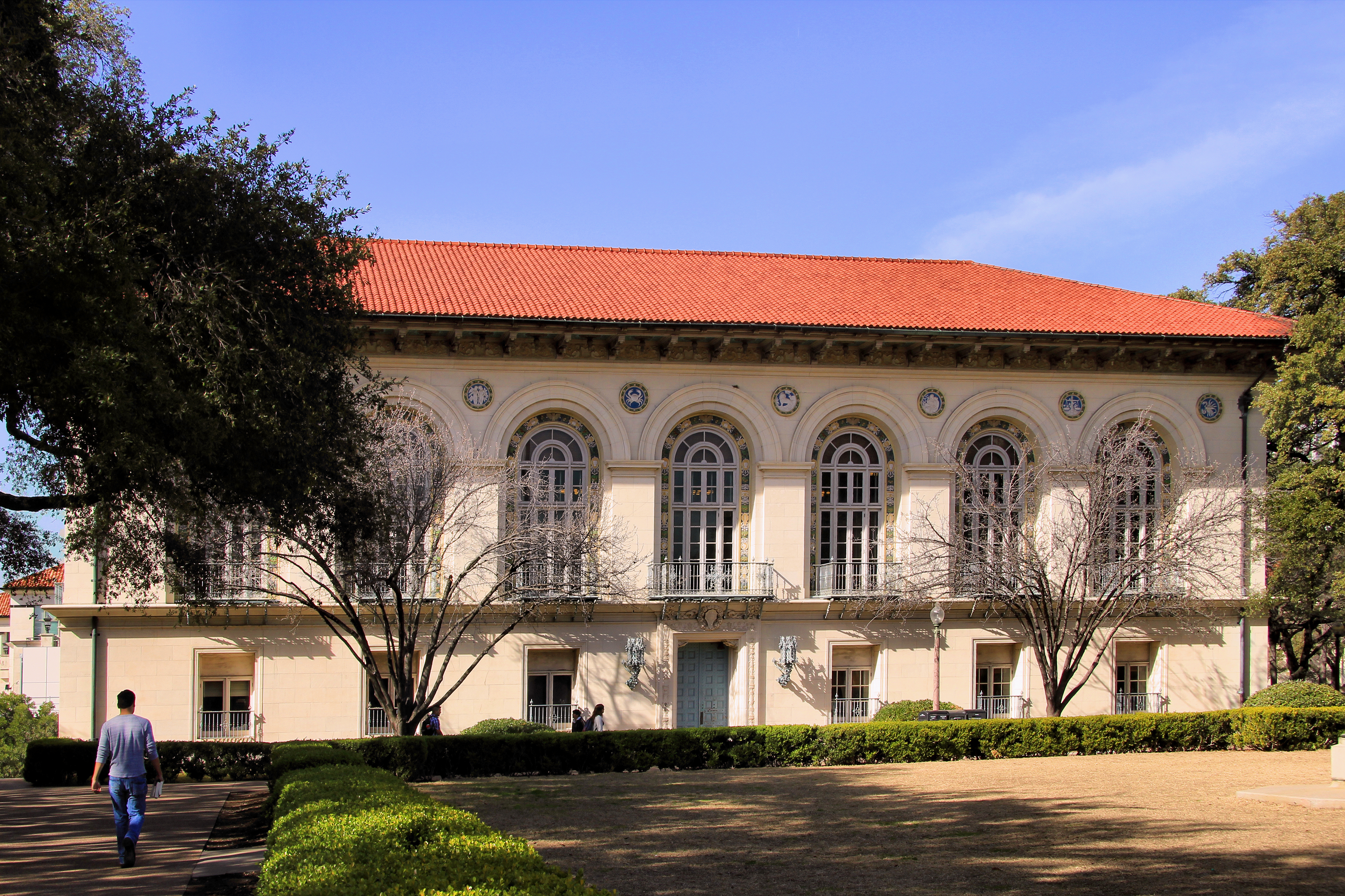
Ghanoonparvar has spent most of his career at the University of Texas at Austin (here, Battle Hall circa 2014)

Ghanoonparvar spent the majority of his academic career at the University of Texas at Austin (1985–2015). He also taught at the University of Isfahan (1974–1975), the University of Virginia (1979–1985), and the University of Arizona. He served on the boards member professional organizations, including president of the American Association of Teachers of Persian and the Texas Association of Middle East Scholars. He also organized and served as program chair of the Fourth Biennial Conference of the Association for Iranian Studies.

Ghanoonparvar is an authority on Persian literature and culture, having published in both English and Persian.

In 2013, after forty years, he retired from active teaching. He continues to publish studies and translations.

== Personal life ==
Ghanoonparvar married Diane L. Wilcox, with whom he has translated or co-published – most importantly, "The Fairies" by Ahmad Shamlu (1980). They have two children.

== Legacy ==
Ghanoonparvar has received two publications in recognition of his work:

- Persian Mosaic: Essays on Persian language, Literature and Film in Honor of M.R. Ghanoonparvar (2015)
- Bright Diversities of Day: Essay on Persian Literature and Culture in Honor of M.R. Ghanoonparvar (2016)

== Awards ==
- Rockefeller Fellow at the University of Michigan
- 2008: Lois Roth Persian Translation Prize from the American Institute for Iranian Studies for Translating the Garden
- 2009: Lifetime Achievement Award from the Encyclopaedia Iranica for Contributions to Iranian Culinary Arts

== Works ==
Ghanoonparvar has published on Persian literature and culture as well translation theory and practice, in both English and Persian. His publications include:

Publications with or by Diane L. Wilcox

- "The Fairies" by Ahmad Shamlu (1980)
- The Tale of Ringy by Meyer Azaad (1983)
- Classic Tales of Mulla Nasreddin by Houman Farzad (1989)
- Appointment in Aleppo: The Making of a Suicide Bomber: A Novel by Jaafar Modarres-Sadeghi (2018)

Books - Studies

- Prophets of Doom: Literature as a Socio-Political Phenomenon in Modern Iran (1984)
- In a Persian Mirror: Images of the West and Westerners in Contemporary Iranian Fiction (1993)
- Translating the Garden (2001)
- Reading Chubak (2005)
- Iranian Film and Persian Fiction (2016)

Audio - Language

- Persian for Beginners with Fatemeh Givechian (1988)

Books - Translations

- The Patient Stone by Sadeq Chubak (1989)
- Savushun by Simin Daneshvar (1990)
- Othello in Wonderland and Mirror-polishing Storytellers (1996)
- The Myth of Creation: A Puppet Show in Three Acts by Sadeq Hedayat (1998)
- The Tales of Sabalan: Two Short Novels by Mohammad Reza Bayrami (2008)
- Fortune Told in Blood by Davud Ghaffarzadagan (2008)
- The Neighbor Says: Nima Yushij and the Philosophy of Modern Persian Poetry by Nima Yushij (2009)
- Memoirs of the Actor in a Supporting Role by Bahram Beyzai (2010)
- Horse's Head: A Novel by Jaafar Modarres-Sadeghi (2011)
- Red Olive: One Woman's Account of Survival, Revolution, and War by Nahid Yousefian (2015)
- Eagles of Hill 60 by Mohammad Reza Bayrami (2016)
- Book of Jinn: A Novel by Houshang Golshiri (2019)
- Flight into Darkness: A Political Biography of Shapour Bakhtiar by Hamid Shokat (2019)
- Blue Logos: A Novel by Shahmush Parsipur (2019)
- The Last Dream by Ruhangiz Sharifian (2020)
- Doran: A Novel by Ruhangiz Sharifian (2020)
- Caught in the Crossfire: A Political Biography of Ahmad Qavam: Prime Minister under the Qajar and Pahlavi Dynasties by Hamid Shokat (2019)
- In the Alley of a Friend: On the Poetry of Hafez by Shahrokh Meskoob (2021)
- Leaving, Staying, Returning: A Trilogy by Shahrokh Meskoob (2021)
- Nights in Tehran: A Novel by Ghazaleh Alizadeh (2021)

Books - Anthologies, Collections

- Iranian Drama: An Anthology (1989)
- Satan's Stones by Moniro Ravanipour (1996)
- Kanizu: Stories (2004)

Books - Cuisine

- Persian Cuisine I: Traditional Foods (1982)
- Persian Cuisine II: Regional and Modern Foods (1984)
- Persian Cuisine: Traditional, Regional and Modern Foods (2006)
- Dining at the Safavid Court: 16th Century Royal Persian Recipe (2017)

Articles

- "Jalal Al Ahmad's The Cursing of the Land" (1980)
- "Sadeq Chubak's The Patient Stone" (1980)
- "Displaced Entities, Shattered Identities, and the Loss of Paradise" (2019)

Encyclopaedia Iranica

- "Boran"
- "Bozbash"
- "Drama"

== See also ==
- Persian literature
- Persian cuisine
