= Bahram Beyzai =

Iranian playwright, theatre director and screenwriter (1938–2025)

Bahram Beyzaie
- بهرام بیضائی
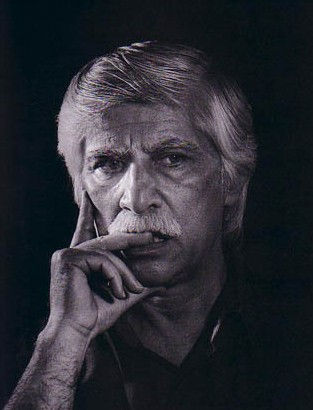
- Beyzaie in 2002
- Born: 26 December 1938; Tehran, Iran
- Died: 26 December 2025 (aged 87); Palo Alto, California, U.S.
- Occupations: Playwright, theatre director, filmmaker, scholar
- Years active: 1962–2025
- Spouses: Monir-A'zam Raminfar (m. 1965; div. 1994) Mojdeh Shamsaie (m. 1992)
- Children: 4, including Niloofar Beyzaie

Bahrām Beyzaie (also spelt Beyzāêi, Beizāi, Beyzāêi, Beyzāee, Persian: بهرام بیضائی; 26 December 1938 – 26 December 2025) was an Iranian filmmaker, playwright, theatre director, researcher, and ostād ("master") of Persian literature, mythology, and Iranian studies.

Beyzaie was the son of the poet Ne'matallah Beyzai (best known by his literary pseudonym "Zokā'i"), and there were several other poets in his family.

Before he started making films in 1970, he was a leading playwright. Despite his belated start in cinema, Beyzai is often considered a pioneer of a generation of filmmakers whose works are sometimes described as the Iranian New Wave. His Bashu, the Little Stranger (1986) was voted "Best Iranian Film of all time" in November 1999 by the Persian movie magazine Picture World poll of 150 Iranian critics and professionals.

From 2010, Beyzai lived and taught at Stanford University in California, United States. While in United States he was very critical of Iranian Islamic regime.

== Early life and education ==
Bahram Beyzai was born on 26 December 1938 in Tehran, to a Baháʼí poet, anthologist, biographer, and jurist father, Ne'matallah Beyzai, and a housewife mother, Nayereh Movafegh. Beyzai’s father used the pen name "Zokā’i" in his poetry, composed poems about the Baháʼí Faith, and wrote a four-volume book on Baháʼí poets entitled Tadhkirat al-Shu‘arā-ye Qarn-e Avval-e Baháʼí (Biographical Anthology of the Poets of the First Bahá’í Century). The celebrated poet Adib Beyzai, one of the most profound poets of 20th-century Iran, was Beyzai's paternal uncle. His paternal grandfather, Mirzā Mohammad-Rezā Ārāni ("Ebn Ruh"), and paternal great-grandfather, the Mulla Mohammad-Faqih Ārāni ("Ruh'ol-Amin"), were also notable poets.

Bahram Beyzai started skipping school from around the age of 17 in order to go to the movies, which were becoming increasingly popular in Iran at a rapid pace. This only deepend his hunger to learn more about cinema and the visual arts.

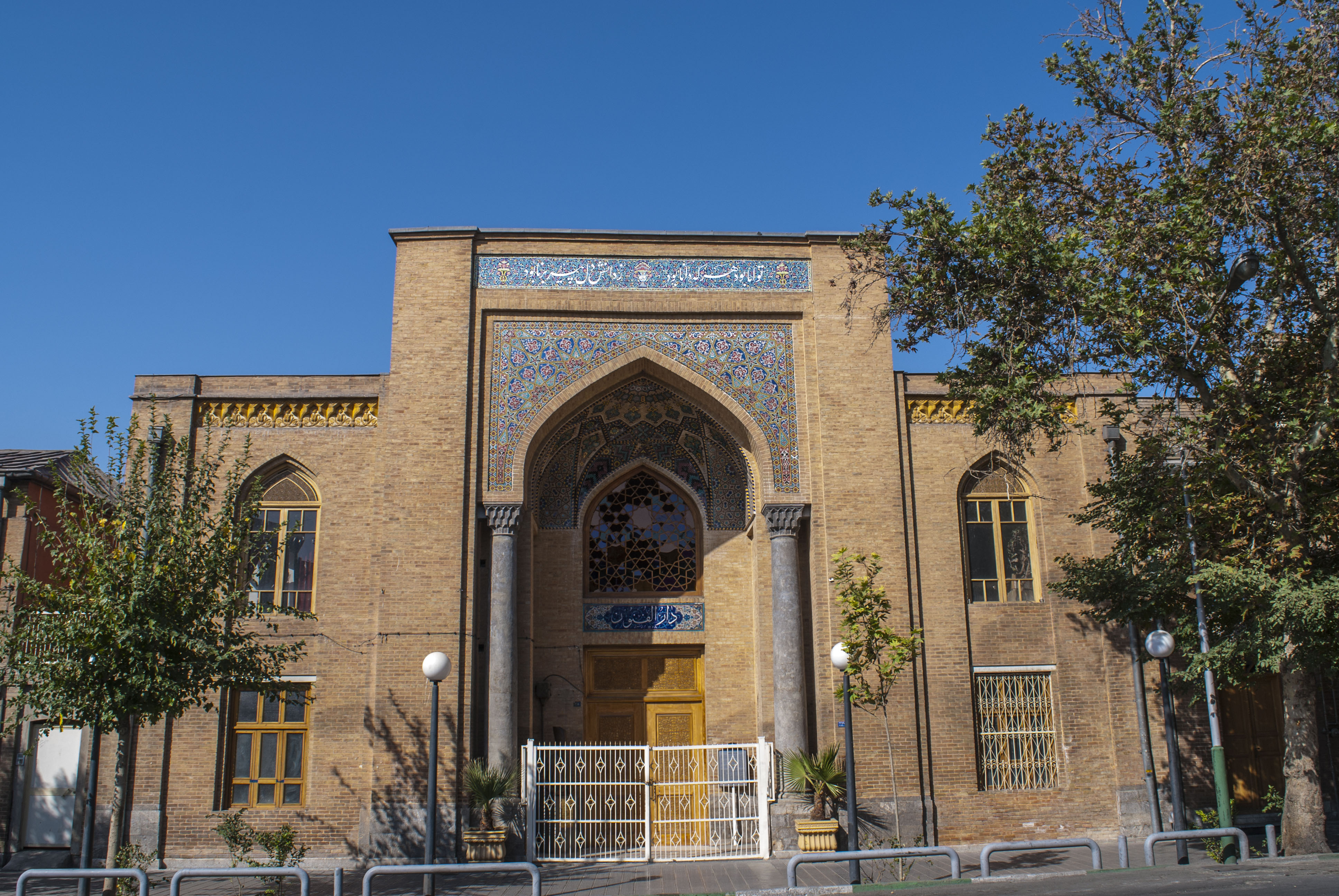
Beyzai attended the Dar'ol-Fonoun high school as an adolescent, where he did not get along with his peers and teachers, and regularly skipped classes to go to the movies. In his late teens he composed his earliest dramatic pieces.

The young Bahram did not seem very interested in his family legacy or poetry, the latter of which was pursued by his father, uncles and cousins. In high school, Dar'ol-Fonoun, he wrote two historical plays which went on to become his preferred method of writing.

At the age of 21, he did substantial research on the traditional Persian plays, particularly ta'ziyeh, and by 1961 he had already spent a great deal of time studying and researching other ancient Persian and pre-Islamic cultures and literatures. This, in turn, led him to study Eastern theatre and traditional Iranian theatre and arts, which would help him formulate a new non-Western identity for Iranian theatre. He also became acquainted with Persian painting.

== Career ==
=== Playwriting in the 1960s ===
In 1968, Beyzai was one of the nine founders of the Iranian Writers' Guild, which was a highly controversial organization in the face of censorship. In 1969, he was invited to teach at the Theater Department of the College of Fine Arts at the University of Tehran. He chaired this department from 1972 to 1979. With his readership, many prominent authors and artists started teaching at the department and created the most fruitful period in the history of that department.

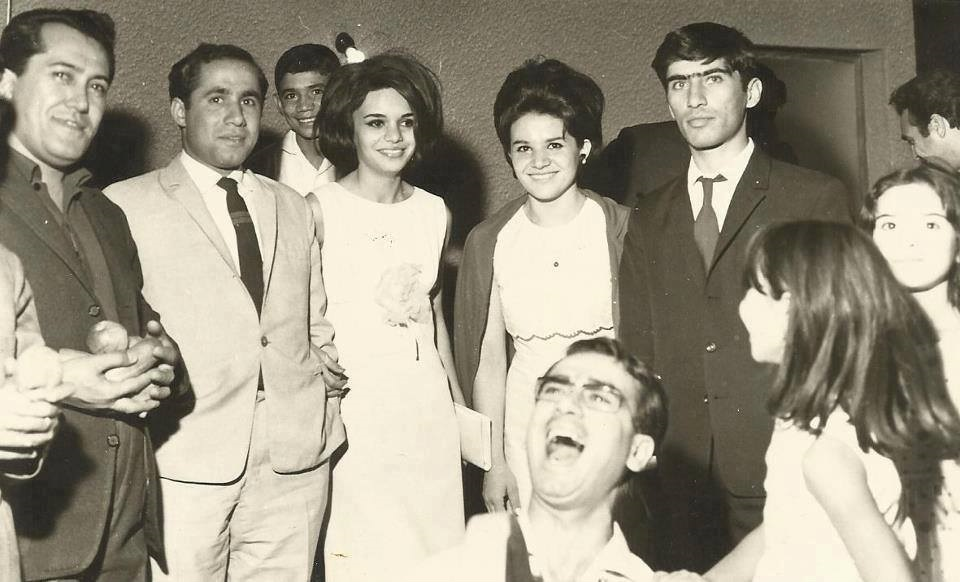
Beyzai in his first wedding in the company of other artists, notably Parviz Fannizadeh and Parviz Sayyad, 1965

Beyzaie's groundbreaking A Study on Iranian Theatre (Namayesh dar Iran), published in mid-1960s is still considered the most important text on the history of Iranian theater. Beyzaie is also the first scholar in Iran to publish books on theatre of Japan and theatre of China.

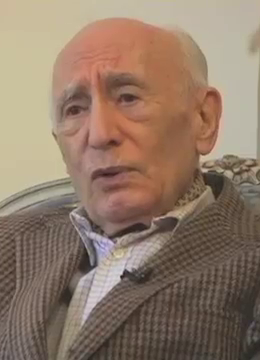
His poetic vein is unmistakable. He writes as though he had a sad look in his eyes, a detached and philosophical understanding in his tone. A vague sense of destiny haunts his plays.

— Ehsan Yarshater

Some of his plays, such as his masterpiece Death of Yazdgerd, have been translated into numerous languages and performed worldwide. Death of Yazdgerd has been performed in Iran, France, England, India and the USA, among other countries, and was made into a film of the same name by Beyzai in 1981. Death of Yazdgerd and Kalat Claimed have been translated into English by Manuchehr Anvar.

He was a leading playwright as well as theatre historian, and is often considered the greatest playwright of the Persian language, and holds a reputation as "The Shakespeare of Persia".

=== The 1970s and the outset of a cinematic career ===
In 1969, he began his film career by directing the short film Amu Sibilou (Uncle Moustache) followed by "Safar" in 1970. With these films, Beyzai is often considered to be a pioneer of the Iranian New Wave, a Persian cinema movement that was started in the late 1960s.

Immediately after, in 1971, he made his first feature film Ragbar (Downpour) which critics regard to this day as one of the most successful Iranian films ever made. The successful film addresses the late Parviz Fannizadeh as its central character and protagonist.

He produced and directed eight films, including Qaribe va Meh (Stranger and the Fog) (1974), Cherike-ye Tara (Ballad of Tara) (1979), Bashu, the Little Stranger (1986, released in 1989), Shāyad Vaghti digar (Maybe Another Time) (1988) and Mosaferan (Travellers) (1992).

=== Filmmaking in the 1980s ===
In 1981, the revolutionary leaders started the Iranian Cultural Revolution, as a result of which Beyzaie, among many others, was expelled from the university. He continued writing and making films, though. His screenplay Ruz-e Vaqe'e (The Fateful Day) was adapted into a film in 1995 and another screenplay was adapted into a film named Fasl-e Panjom (The fifth season) in 1996, while he also made four of his finest films. He also edited Ebrahim Hatamikia's Borj-e Minu (Minoo Tower).

=== 1990–2025 ===
After Mosaferan, he failed to get a permit to produce several screenplays. In 1995, he left Iran for Strasbourg at the invitation of the International Parliament of Writers. Soon however, he returned and staged The Lady Aoi in Tehran.

In 2001, he made his film Killing Mad Dogs, after which he staged three plays.

He left Iran in 2010 at the invitation of Stanford University, and was the Daryabari Visiting Professor of Iranian Studies, teaching courses in Persian theatre, cinema and mythology. He gave workshops on the Shahnameh, the history of Iranian performing arts, Iranian and Semitic myths. Beyzai also staged several plays, including his nine-hour Tarabnameh.

== Cinematic style ==
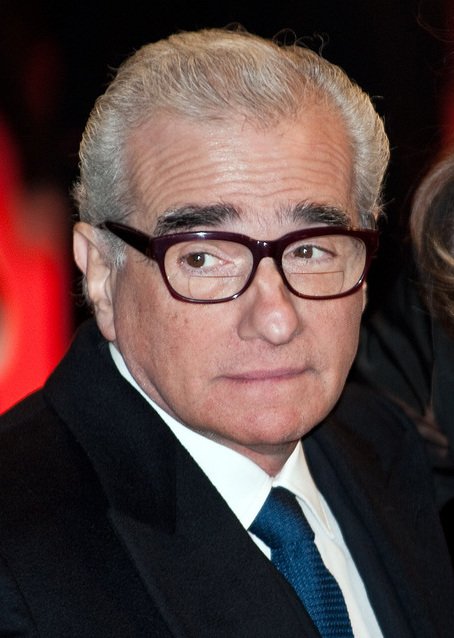
... you can feel Bayzaie's background in Persian literature, theater and poetry. Bayzaie never received the support he deserved from the government of his home country...

— Martin Scorsese

Some people in our old and enduring culture assume iconic significance for reasons far beyond our crooked measures. Beizai is one of them. When the annals of our contemporary history are written, Beizai will have the same significance as Hafez.

— Hamid Dabashi

He is known as the most intellectual and conspicuous "author" in Iranian cinema and theater. The main theme of his works is the history and "crisis of identity," which is related to Iranian cultural and mythical symbols and paradigms. He is considered Iran's most prominent screenwriter in terms of the dramatic integrity of his works, many of which have been made into films.

== Reception and criticism ==
Beyzaie's film Bashu, the Little Stranger (1986) was voted "Best Iranian Film of all time" in November 1999 by a Persian movie magazine Picture World poll of 150 Iranian critics and professionals.

Ebrahim Golestan, who had previously objected to Beyzaie's style, praised him in a letter in 2017.

In 2025, Bashu, the Little Stranger won the best film in the Classics section at the Venice International Film Festival.

== Personal life ==
Beyzaie married Monir-A'zam Raminfar in 1965; they divorced in 1994. He married Mojdeh Shamsaie in 1992.

He had four children, including Niloofar Beyzaie, Arjang (died), Negar, Niassan.

== Later life, death, and legacy ==
Beyzaie moved to the United States in 2010. He was a visiting professor in Iranian studies at Stanford University for 15 years.

He died in Palo Alto, California, on 26 December 2025, his 87th birthday.

Prince Reza Pahlavi, the exiled son of the last Shah of Iran, paid tribute by describing Beyzaie's demise as "a great loss for the art and culture of Iran".

== Works ==
=== Filmography (as director) ===
- Amū Sibilū (1969 – short)
- Safar (1970 – short – a.k.a. The Journey)
- Ragbār (1972 – a.k.a. Downpour)
- Qaribé va Meh (1974 – a.k.a. The Stranger and the Fog)
- Kalāq (1976 – a.k.a. The Crow or The Raven )
- Charike-ye Tārā (1979 – a.k.a. Ballad of Tara)
- Marg-e Yazdgerd (1982 – a.k.a. Death of Yazdgerd)
- Bashu, the Little Stranger (1986 – a.k.a. Bashu – released 1989)
- Shāyad Vaghti Digar (1988 – a.k.a. Maybe Some Other Time)
- Mosāferan (1992 – a.k.a. Travellers)
- Goft-o-gū bā Bād (1998 – short – a.k.a. Talking with the Wind)
- Sagkoshi (2001 – a.k.a. Killing Mad Dogs)
- Qāli-ye Sokhangū (2006 – short – The Talking Carpet)
- Vaqti Hame Khāb-im (2009 – When We are All Asleep)

=== Plays ===
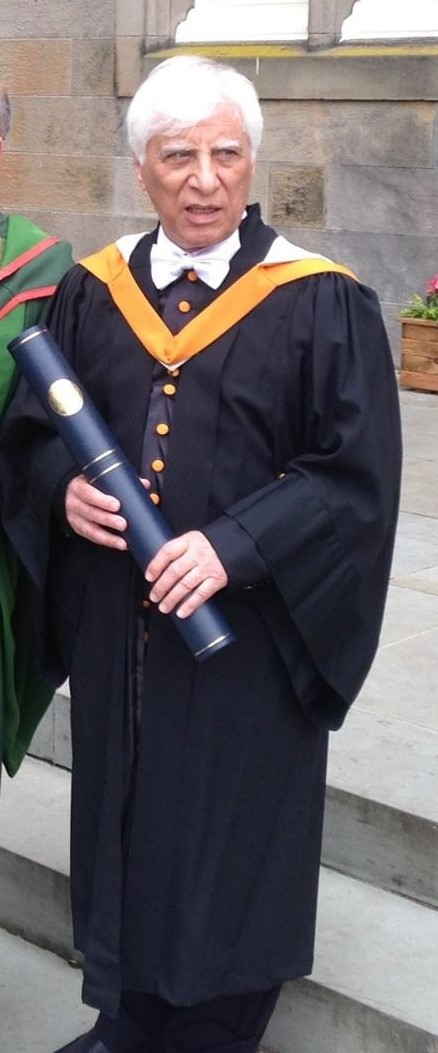
Beyzai, dressed in a St Andrews black cassock with a yellow hood, having just received an honorary doctorate in letters, June 2017

Beyzaie has over 50 published plays, some of which are as follows. These works have occasionally appeared in French, English, German and other translations.

- "Gorob dar Diari Garib" (Evening in a Strange Land, translation into English by Gisele Kapuscinski)
- "Chahar Sandoogh" (Four Boxes, translation into English by M.R. Ghanoonparvar and John Green)
- "Hashtomin Safar e Sandbad" (Sindbad's Eighth Voyage; Le Huitième voyage de Sindbad, translation into French by Ahmad Kamyabi Mask ISBN 9782950480613)
- Ziāfat va Mirās (1967 – a.k.a. Heritage and The Feast)
- Soltān-Mār (1969 – a.k.a. The King Snake)
- Marg-e Yazdgerd (1979 – a.k.a. Death of Yazdgerd)
- Memoirs of the Actor in a Supporting Role (1981)
- Kalat Claimed (1982)
- Kārnāme-ye Bandār Bidakhsh (1997 and 1998)
- Bānū Aoi (The Lady Aoi (Bahram Beyzai production) (1997 and 1998) based on The Lady Aoi by Yukio Mishima)
- Shab-e Hezār-o-yekom (The One Thousand and First Night) (2003)
- Afrā yā Ruz migozarad (2007 – a.k.a. Afra, or the Day Passes)
- Crossroads (2009)
- Jana and Baladoor (2012 – A Play in Shadows)
- Arash (2013 – A Play Reading)
- Ardaviraf's Report (2015)
- Tarabnameh (2016 – Part one and Part two)

== Awards and honors ==
The prizes, awards and honors he has won are numerous.

- 2017, D.Litt. honoris causa, University of St Andrews
- 2014, Bita Prize for Persian Arts
- 2012, Farhang Foundation Heritage Award
