= Pacitto =

Pacitto is an Italian surname. Notable people with the surname include:

- Brando Pacitto (born 1996), Italian actor
- Marialia Pacitto (born 1989), Italian-American fashion designer
