= Sonja Kirchberger =

Austrian actress (born 1964)

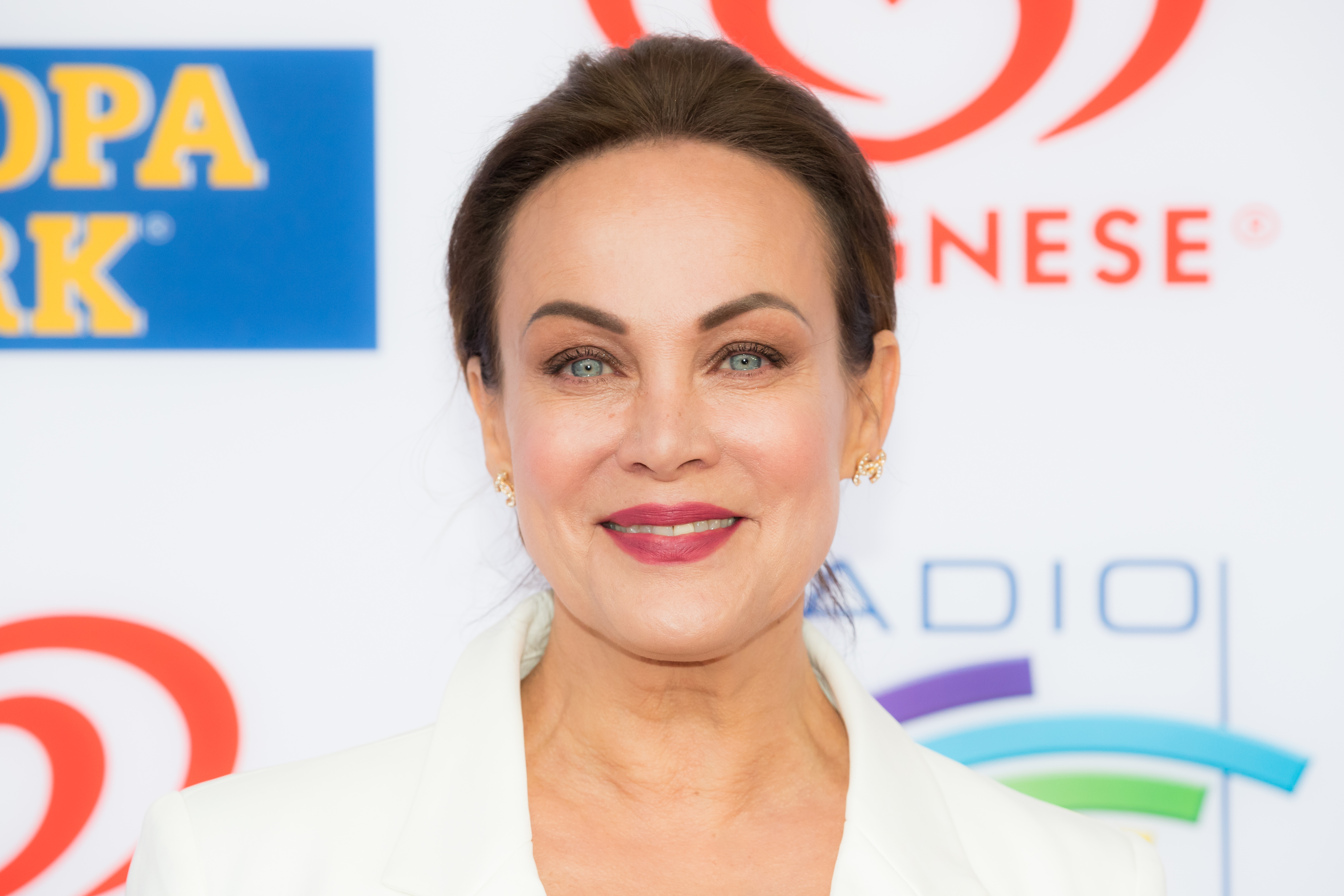
- Sonja Kirchberger in 2019
- Born: 9 November 1964 (age 60); Vienna, Austria
- Occupation: actress

Sonja Kirchberger (born 9 November 1964 in Vienna, Austria) is an Austrian actress.

From 1974 to 1978 she was a dancer in the Ballet of the Opera in Vienna (Wiener Oper). She became popular to the European public as Coco, a sensuous but dangerous seductress in the 1988 German blockbuster The Venus Trap. Till now she was to be seen in about 40 movies, some Italian and French productions, and English in Seven Servants (1996) by Daryush Shokof with Anthony Quinn, but mostly in German TV/cinema.

Sonja Kirchberger is mother of a girl and a boy.

== Partial filmography ==
- The Venus Trap (1988), as Coco
- Peter Strohm: Einsteins Tod (1991, TV), as Anita Claasen
- Sissi la valse des cœurs (a.k.a. Sisi und der Kaiserkuss, 1991), as Néné
- L'Alerte rouge (1991, TV film), as Inge Bauer
- The True Story About Men and Women (1992), as Eva
- Amok (1993), as Mistress in Munich
- Hunt for the Blue Diamond (1993), as Barbara Latouche
- Anwalt Abel: Rufmord (1994, TV), as Stella
- Padre papà (1996, TV film), as Iris
- Peanuts – The Bank Pays Everything (1996), as Madeleine
- Seven Servants (1996), as Maid
- Tanz auf dem Vulkan (1996, TV miniseries), as Olga
- Un prete tra noi: La sindrome di Stoccolma (1997, TV), as Claudia Gruber
- The King of St. Pauli (1998, TV miniseries), as Lajana
- Gigolo – Bei Anruf Liebe (1998, TV film), as Lisa
- In fondo al cuore (1998, TV film), as Carla
- Benzin im Blut (1999, TV series, 14 episodes), as Jeannine Jourdan
- Kill Me Softly – Frauenmord in Frankfurt (2000, TV film), as Police Inspector Anna Göllner
- Die Liebende (a.k.a. Blutsbande, 2000, TV film), as Mona
- Der Runner (2000, TV film), as Danielle Reuter
- Der schwarze Spiegel (2000, TV film), as Cora Talheim
- Lenya (2001, TV film), as Kundrie
- Umwege des Herzens (2001, TV film), as Sarah von Wytersheim
- How Do You Change Your Parents? (2003, TV film), as Lydia Lufft
- Sommernachtstod (2003, TV film), as Police Inspector Anna Göllner
- Das böse Mädchen (2003, TV film), as Police Inspector Anna Göllner
- Neues vom Wixxer (2007), as Lady Dickham
- Die Bienen – Tödliche Bedrohung (2008, TV film), as Susanna Bergmann
- Snow White (2009, TV film), as Evil Queen
- Sources of Life (2013), as Marie Freytag
- A World Beyond (2013, TV film), as Emmy Hartwig
- Tom Sawyer & Huckleberry Finn (2014), as Widow Douglas
- Gut zu Vögeln (2016), as Sonja
