= Sara Schätzl =

German columnist, author and actress (born 1987)

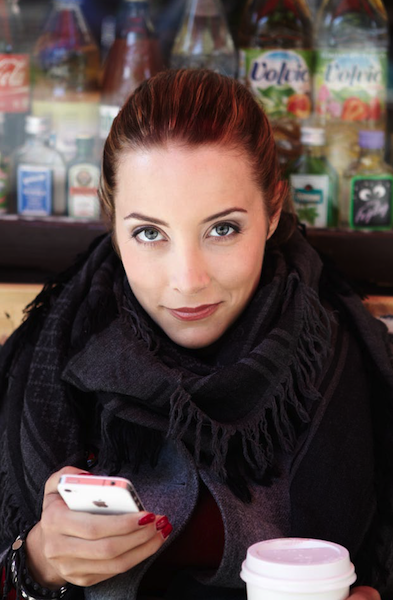
- Schätzl in 2013
- Born: Sara-Maria Schätzl; 12 December 1987 (age 38); Donauwörth, Bavaria, Germany
- Occupations: Columnist; author; businesswoman
- Years active: 2006–present
- Children: 1
- Website: sara-schaetzl.de

Sara-Maria Schätzl (born 12 December 1987) is a German columnist, author, actress, and businesswoman.

== Early life ==
Sara Schätzl grew up in the small Bavarian town Donauwörth. She attended the boarding school Gymnasium Schloss Gaienhofen until she received the Mittlere Reife diploma at the age of sixteen, then dropped out of school and moved to Munich to start a career in the entertainment industry. As her parents didn't support her financially she moved first into a social housing apartment in Munich but in spring 2010 she relocated to Eching.

== Poly Implant Prothèse scandal ==
At the end of December 2011 Schätzl publicly admitted she, like 16,000 other German women, was affected by the scandal about unsafe breast implants made out of industrial silicone by the French company Poly Implant Prothèse. Schätzl could not remove her still intact PIP breast implants as a precaution (as recommended by Germany's Federal Institute for Drugs and Medical Devices) because she announced in January 2012 that she was five months pregnant and therefore did not want to take the risk of a general anaesthetic in fear of harming her unborn child. Schätzl raised awareness about the problems women with the toxic implants faced.

== Personal life ==
Schätzl's son was born six weeks early by caesarean on 11 May 2012. Her then boyfriend of 14 months and the father of her son, DJ and owner of record label Jee-Productions Jerome Isma-Ae left her shortly after the birth. She moved to Los Angeles and in August 2013 she received her green card. She shared her journey with TV show Auf und davon – Mein Auslandstagebuch, in episodes aired in 2014.

== Career ==
Schätzl started to get roles as an extra and supporting act in films and TV series SOKO 5113 and the telenovela Lotta in Love. She made also commercials after she had already done her first at the age of ten.

In 2007, photos appeared in the tabloid press showing the 19-year-old Schätzl as the alleged holiday flirt of actor Bernd Herzsprung during a joint stay in the hotel Liebes Rot Flüh in Haldensee, Tyrol in Austria. Later it came to light that the 65-year-old Herzsprung had arranged the 'paparazzi' pictures himself with the photographer and Schätzl after the separation from his wife Barbara Engel and he denied having a relationship with the young actress.

== Writing ==
In 2009 she started to write the column "Zur Sache Schätzl!" about unusual stories from Munich in the popular German tabloid Bild. Her first book, Glamourgirl, was published in November 2011 by Schwarzkopf & Schwarzkopf. It tells in 33 stories her journey from a small town country girl into the limelight in a big city.

This earned her another contract in 2013 with Schwarzkopf and Schwarzkopf for a second book, Hungriges Herz ("Hungry heart"), published in 2015. In it, she chronicled her battle with bulimia and depression, beginning when she was 14. Schätzl used her diary notes, together with records from her mother and friends, to write the book.. In May 2015 Schätzl started a project on Kickstarter to collect $35000 to produce a short documentary film, ADDICT, based on the book and show the film in schools to discuss the problem of eating disorders with young people. The project ended on 21 May 2015 unsuccessfully. The book, in combination with a press tour, provided Schätzl's first exposure to the public in Switzerland and Austria. She was featured in a number of reputable media sources in print and television, including Kurier Magazine and News magazine.

== Acting ==
After a report was aired on RTL program Punkt 12, her emigration in early 2013 and the process of establishing her acting career was followed by the TV station VOX in their series Auf und davon – Mein Auslandstagebuch and also documented in Schätzl's own video diary. A sequel episode of the RTL and VOX programmes following Schätzl's life in Los Angeles were filmed during autumn 2013 and was aired on VOX in January 2014.

Schätzl studied acting at the Marjorie Ballentine Studio in Los Angeles. In her first movie role she appears as Greta in the short film Doradus, written and directed by Fernando Scarpa, which was released 3 March 2014 and opened at the Philadelphia Independent Film Festival on 25 June 2014.

In October 2015 Schätzl was featured in the Erfolgsmenschen series of the German news magazine Stern. She started together with a friend an expanding club promotion business and is the only female promoter in Los Angeles.

At the beginning of 2016 Schätzl moved from Los Angeles to Las Vegas. Her move was followed by a German TV production. In the summer of 2016 she started a cooperation, called Bottles of kindness, with the Croatian company Eva Maria Cosmetics to promote awareness of autism.

At the end of 2016, Schätzl opened a small bed and breakfast luxury trailers parked in the backyard of her Las Vegas house to have more time to look after her son, who was diagnosed with autism. A documentary about the renovation of her house, which she did herself with the help of members of a rehabilitation program, as well as the set-up and opening of the trailer hotel was aired on German TV in January 2017. She later sold the house and business separately.

== Charity ==
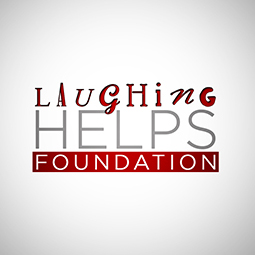
Laughing Helps logo

In 2013 Schätzl started the charity Laughing Helps, which aims to help homeless people in Los Angeles. Videos posted by her on YouTube earn money from sponsors.

== TV appearances ==
Talk and reality shows

- Das perfekte Promi-Dinner (2011, VOX)
- Markus Lanz (2012, ZDF, Talkshow hosted by Markus Lanz)
- Anne Will (2012, ARD, Talkshow hosted by Anne Will)
- Mieten, kaufen, wohnen (2012, VOX)
- Auf und davon – Mein Auslandstagebuch (2013, VOX)
- Auf und davon (2014, VOX)
- Taff (2015, Pro7)
- Taff (2016, Pro7, "Sara Schätzl – What happens in Vegas", five episodes)
- Punkt 12 (2017, RTL)

Commercial

- We Love to Entertain You (as Tanja, Pro7)

== Filmography ==
Film
Year	Title	Role	Notes
2013	Doradus	Gerta	Short film

Television
Year	Title	Role	Notes
2006	Lotta in Love	Sandy	Pro7, telenovela
2009	SOKO 5113	Assistant D.A. Michaele Tanzer	ZDF

== Publications ==
Column

- Zur Sache Schätzl (2010, Bild)

Books

- Glamourgirl (2011)
- Hungriges Herz (2015)
