= Ken Ard =

Ken Ard may refer to:

- Ken Ard (dancer) (born 1960), American dancer, actor and singer
- Ken Ard (politician) (born 1963), 88th Lieutenant Governor of South Carolina
