= Schatzl =

Schatzl or Schätzl is a German surname. Notable people with the surname include:

- Johannes Schätzl (born 1993), German politician
- Nadine Schatzl (born 1993), Hungarian handball player
- Sara Schätzl (born 1987), German columnist, author, actress, and businesswoman

== See also ==
- Schatzi
