= The Masked Singer (German TV series) season 5 =

The Masked Singer
- Season 5
- Starring: Ruth Moschner; Rea Garvey; Various guests
- Hosted by: Matthias Opdenhövel
- No. of contestants: 10 (+1 online)
- Winner: Alexander Klaws as "Mülli Müller"
- Runner-up: Sandy Mölling as "Raupe"
- No. of episodes: 6

Release
- Original network: ProSieben
- Original release: 16 October – 20 November 2021

Season chronology
- ← Previous; Season 4 Next → Season 6

The fifth season of the German singing competition The Masked Singer premiered on 16 October 2021 on ProSieben. Ruth Moschner and Rea Garvey returned to the panel. Matthias Opdenhövel also returned as host.

On 20 November 2021, the Mülli Müller (singer Alexander Klaws) was declared the winner and the Raupe (singer Sandy Mölling) was the runner-up.

== Panelists and host ==
Season 5 panelists and host

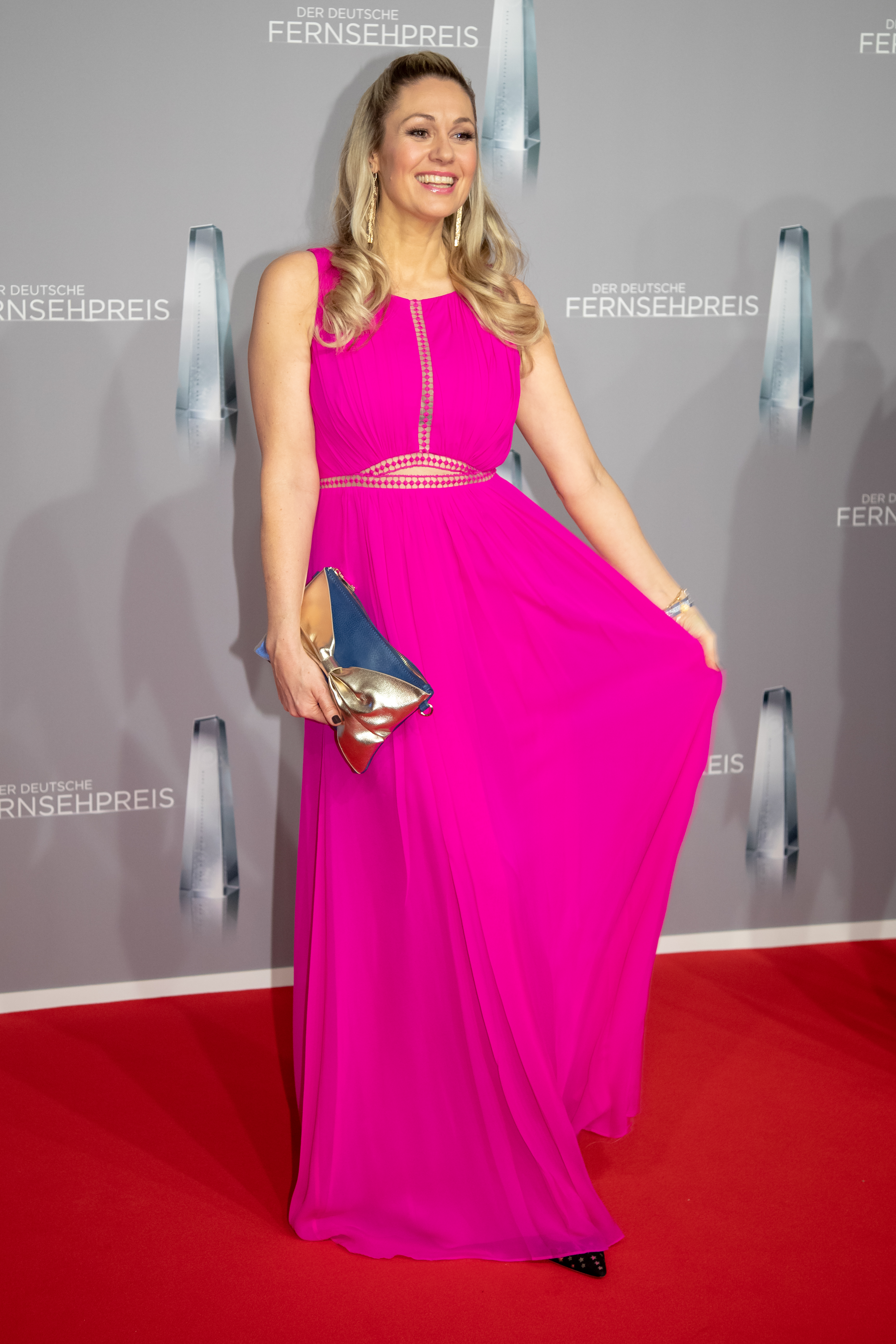
Ruth Moschner

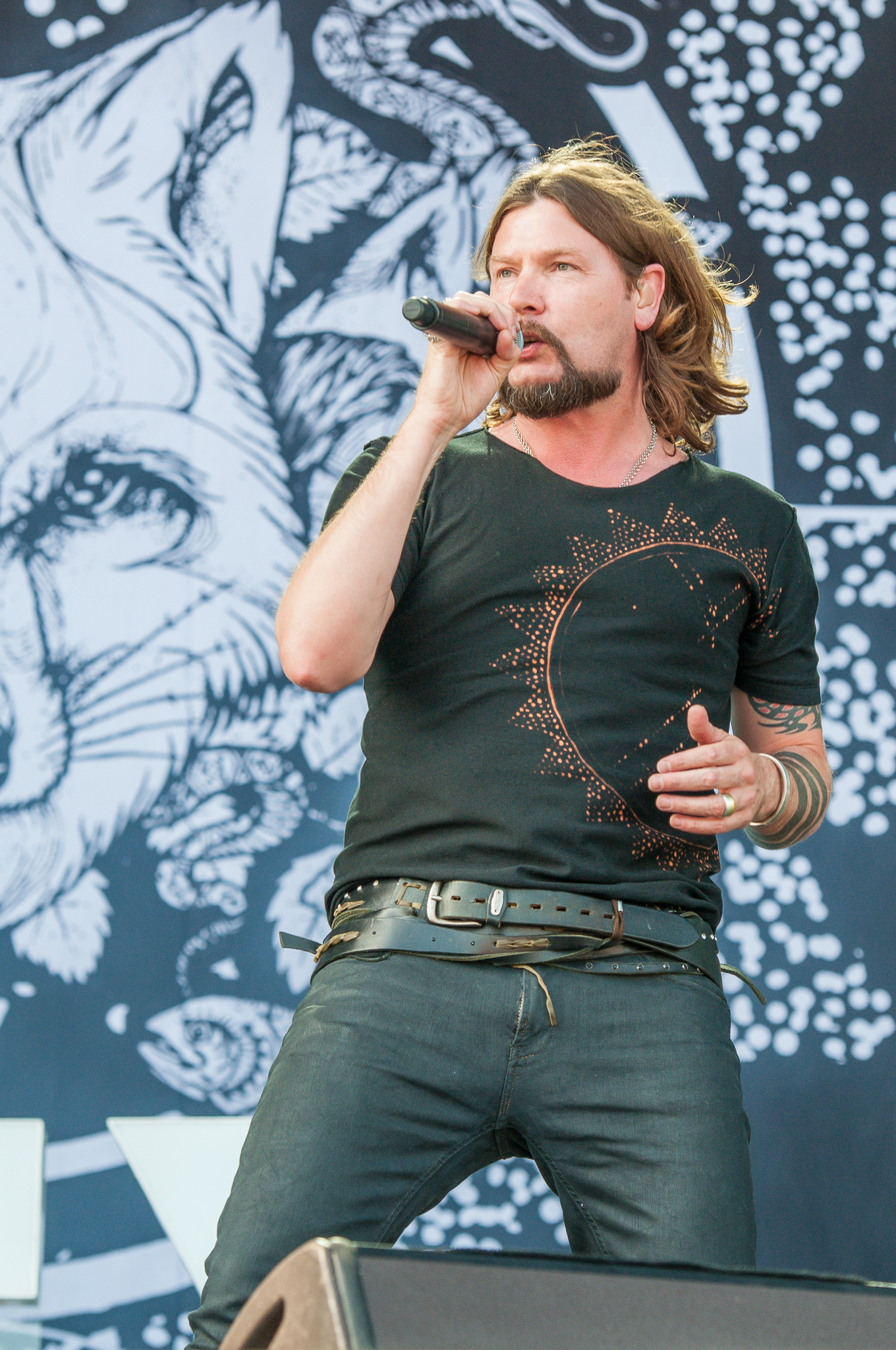
Rea Garvey

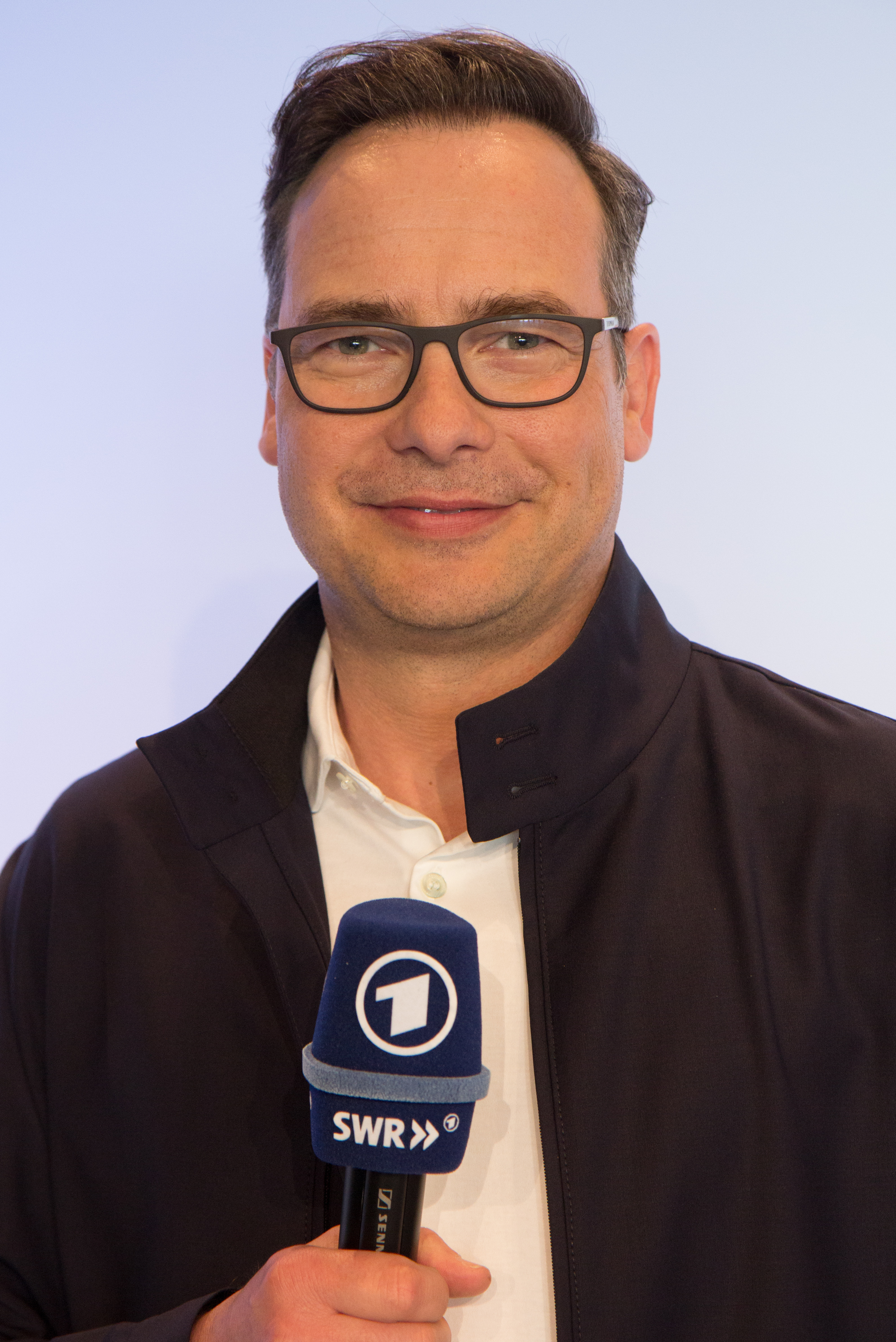
Matthias Opdenhövel

Matthias Opdenhövel returned as host. On 14 September 2021, it was announced that Ruth Moschner, would return for her fourth time as the main panelist. On 19 September 2021, it was announced that also Rea Garvey, from the last season would return, for his third time as main panelist.

As in previous seasons, a spin-off show named The Masked Singer - red. Special was aired after each live episode, hosted by Annemarie Carpendale, who also competed as “Teddy”, (episodes 1–2, 4), Rebecca Mir (episode 3, 5) and Viviane Geppert (episode 6).

=== Guest panelists ===
Various guest panelists appeared as the third judge in the judging panel for one episode. These guest panelists included:

Season 5 guest panelists

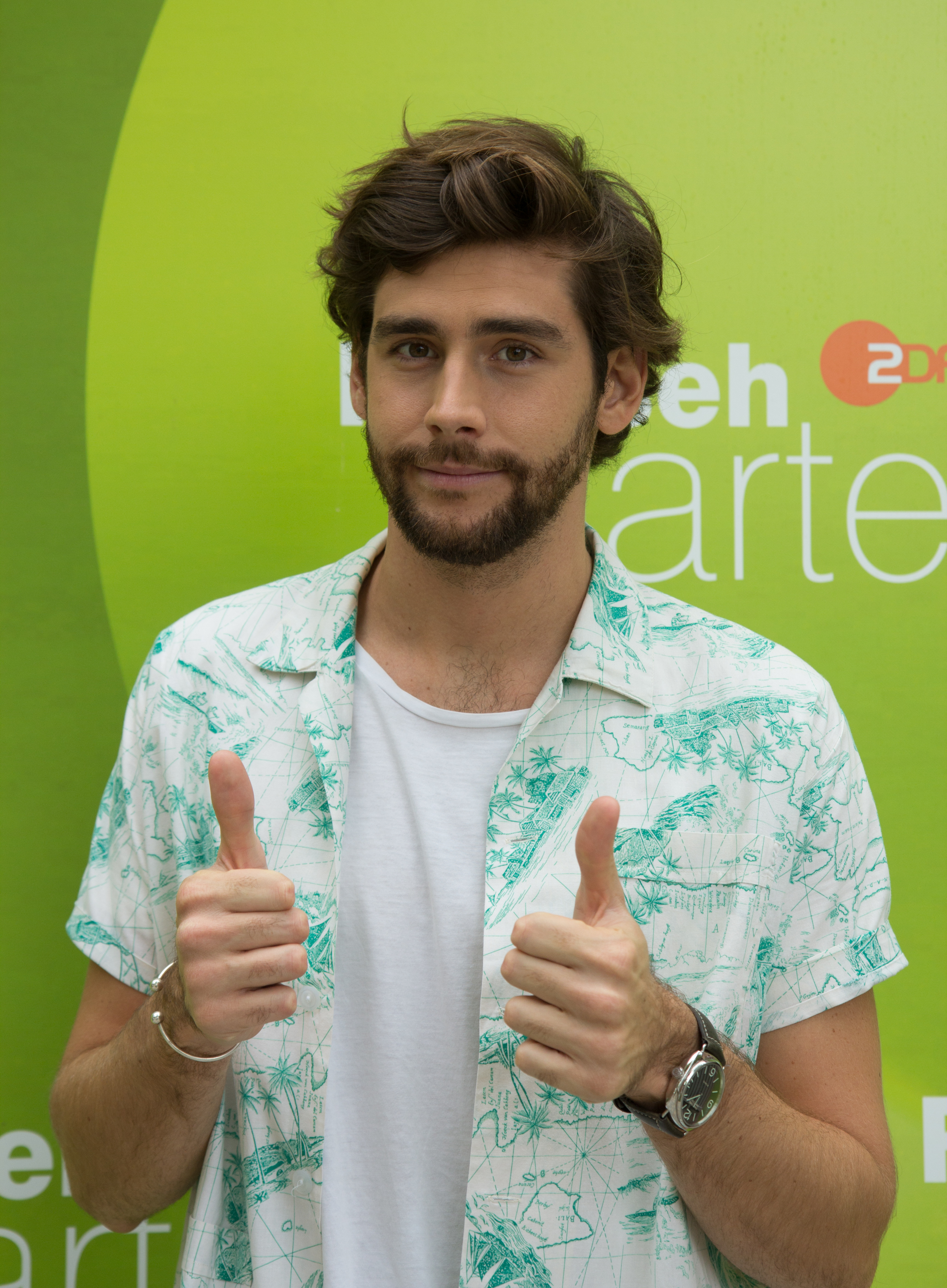
Álvaro Soler (episode 1)

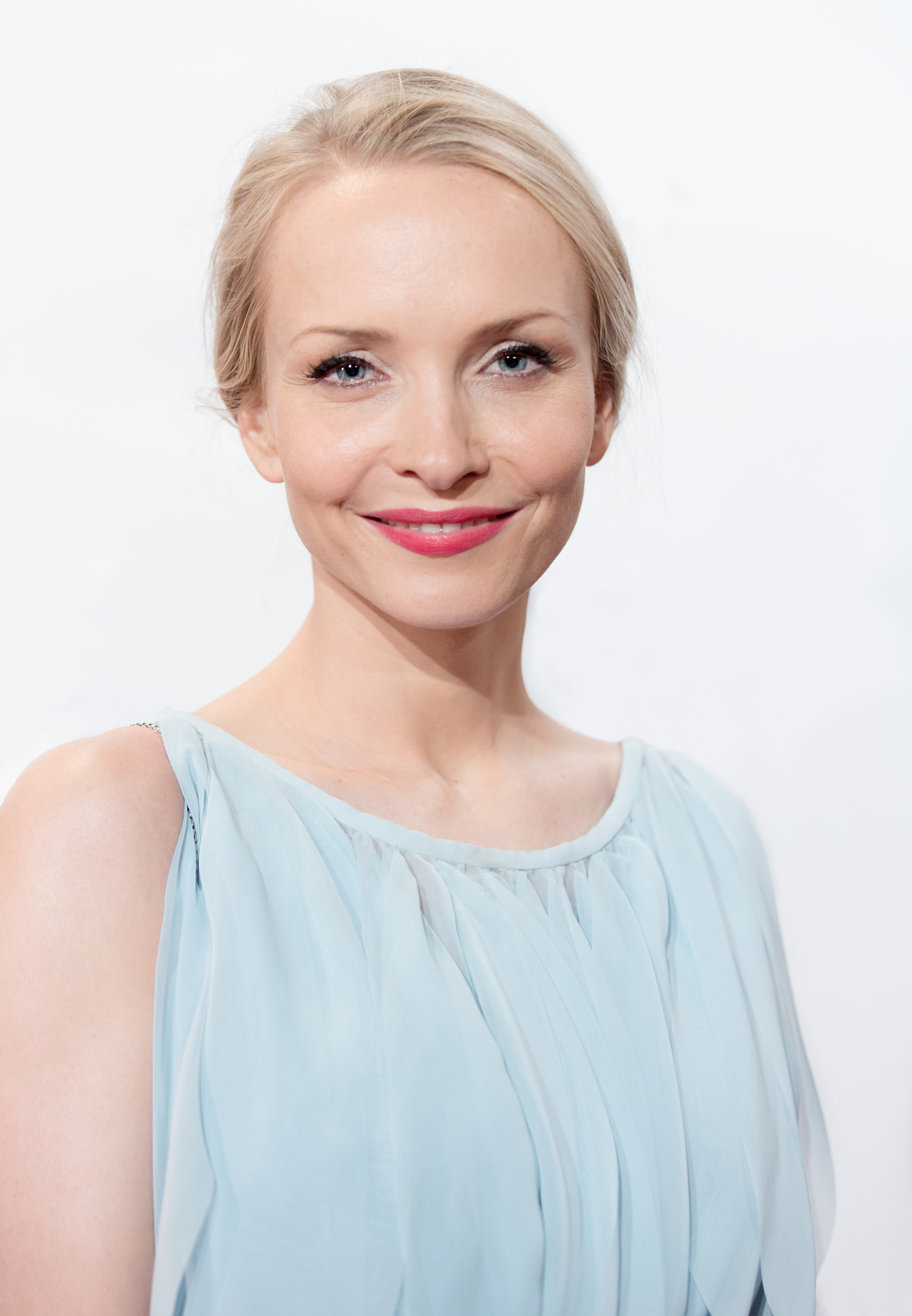
Janin Ullmann (episode 2)

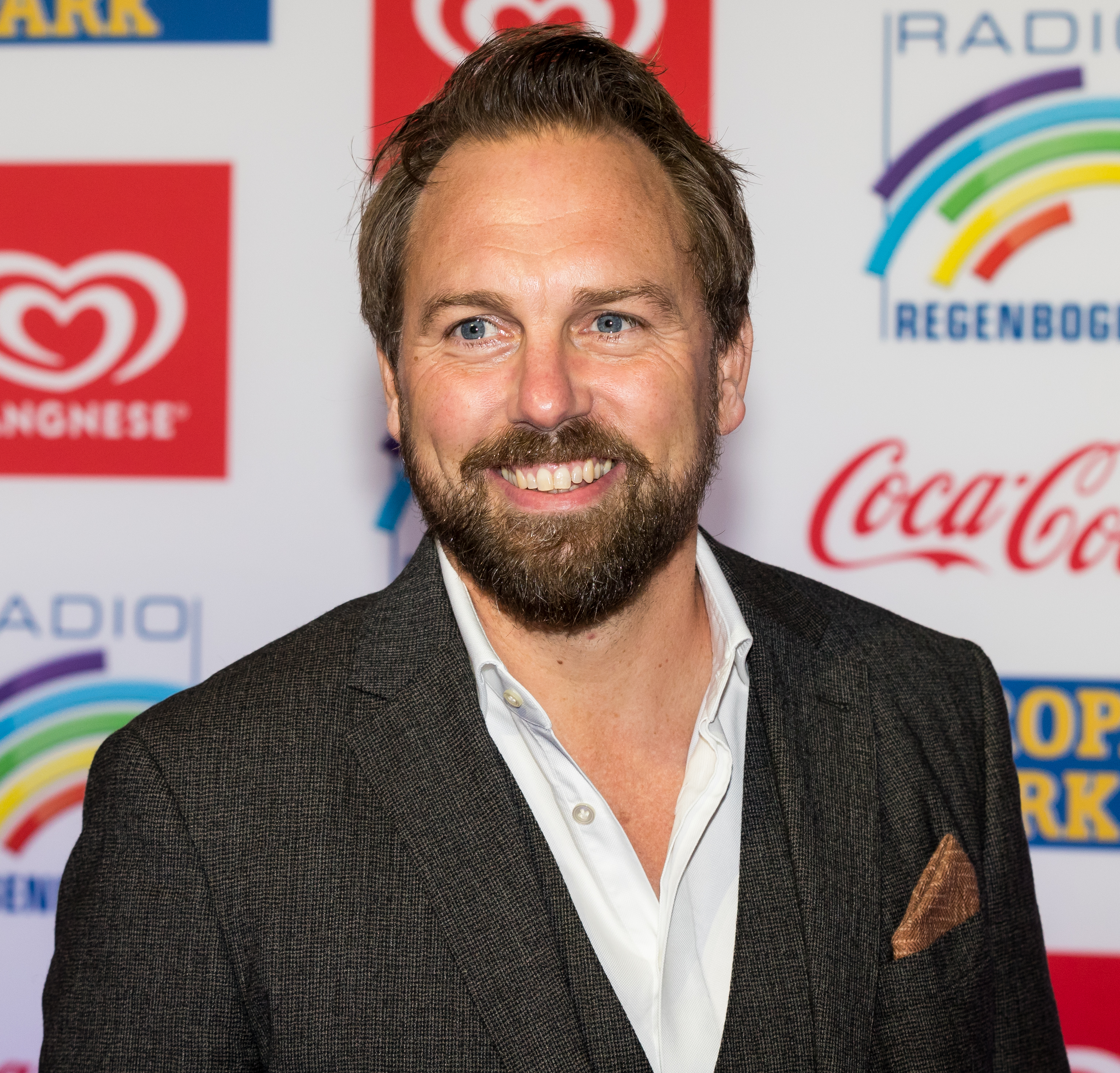
Steven Gätjen (episode 3)

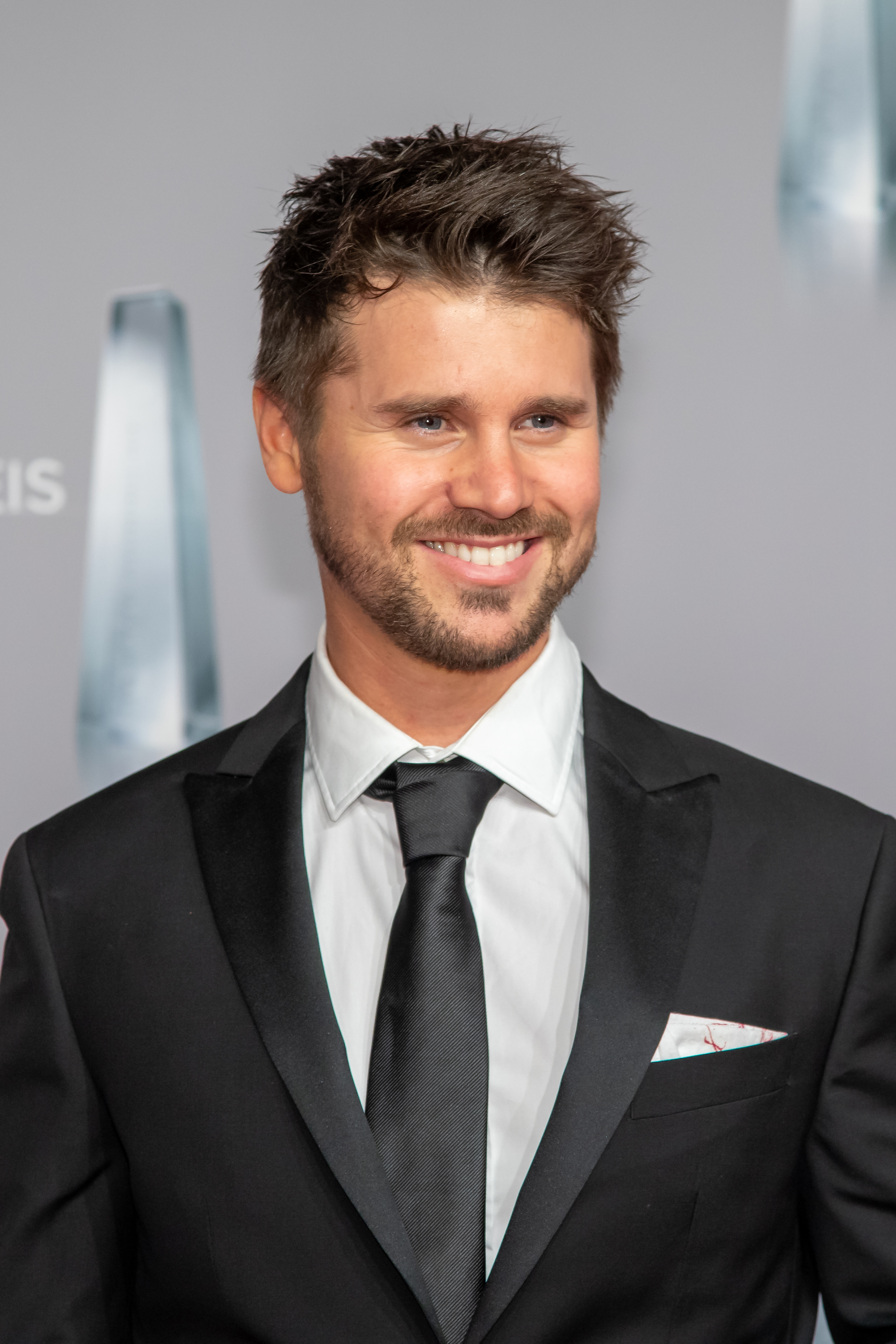
Thore Schölermann (episode 4)

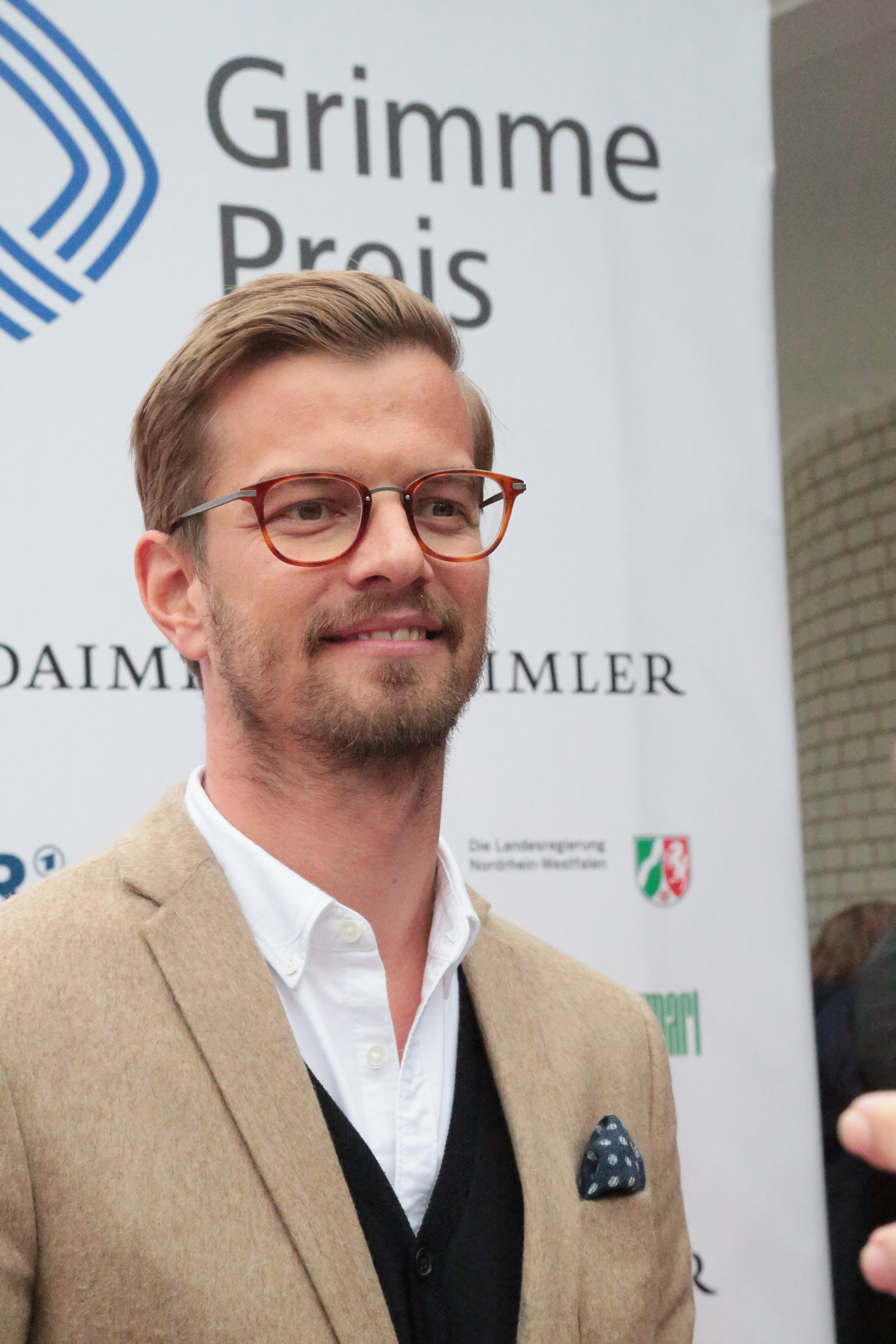
Joko Winterscheidt (episode 5)

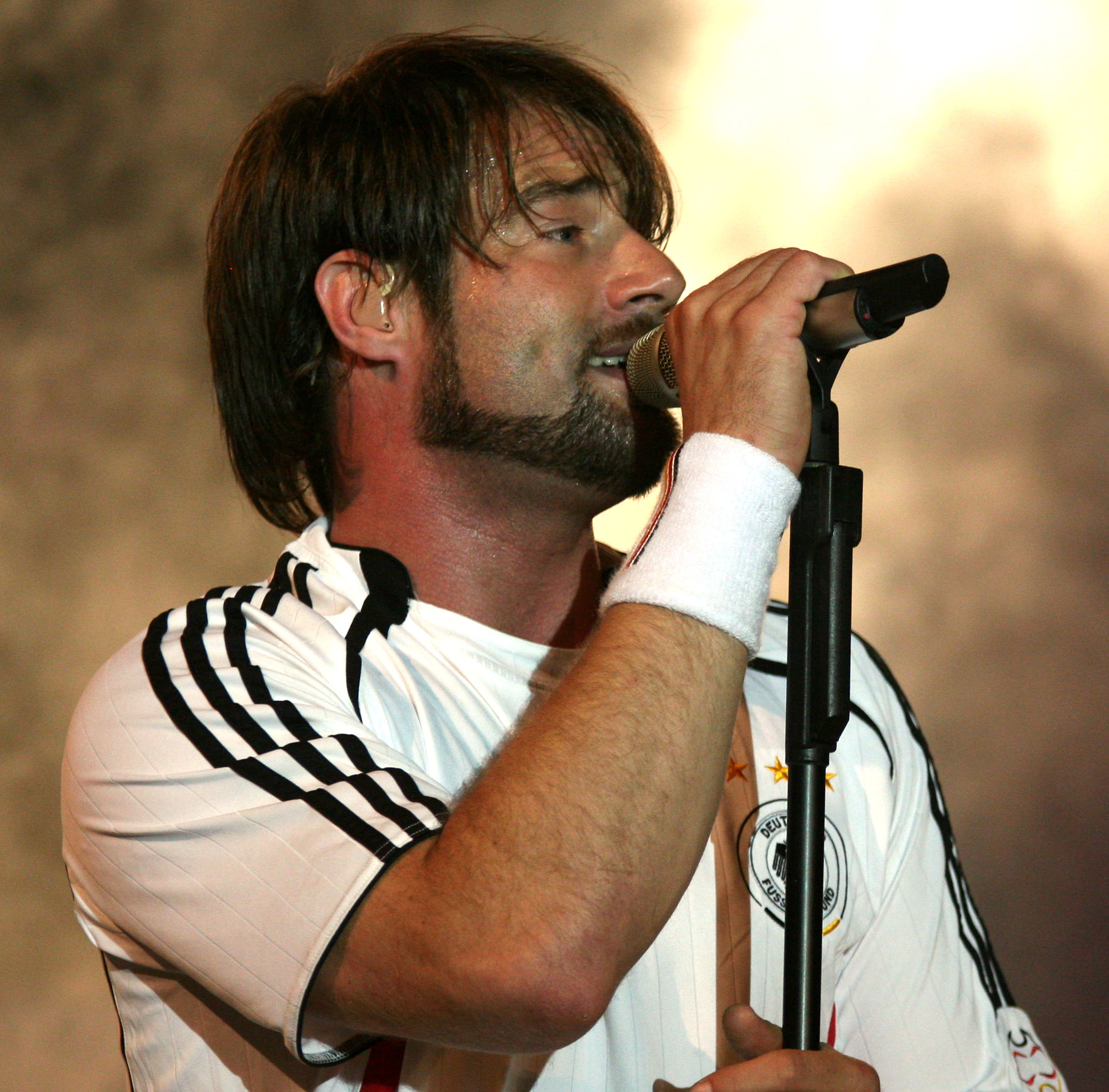
Sasha (episode 6)

Episode	Name	Notability	Ref.
1	Álvaro Soler	Singer	
2	Janin Ullmann	Presenter	
3	Steven Gätjen	TV Presenter	
4	Thore Schölermann	TV Presenter	
5	Joko Winterscheidt	TV Host	
6	Sasha	Singer	

== Contestants ==
Like in the previous seasons, the fifth season included 10 contestants. According to ProSieben, a special eleventh mask, "Tiger" did not compete in the main competition rather they were an online exclusive mask who performed separately and be revealed after the finale of season 5.

Results
Names	Celebrity	Notability	Live Episodes							
Names	Celebrity	Notability	1	2	3	4	5	6		
Names	Celebrity	Notability	1	2	3	4	5	A	B	C
Mülli Müller	Alexander Klaws	Singer	WIN	WIN	WIN	WIN	WIN	SAFE	SAFE	WINNER
Raupe "Caterpillar"	Sandy Mölling	Singer	WIN	WIN	WIN	WIN	WIN	SAFE	SAFE	RUNNER-UP
Heldin "Heroine"	Christina Stürmer	Singer	WIN	WIN	WIN	WIN	RISK	SAFE	THIRD	
Mops "Pug"	Carolin Niemczyk	Singer	WIN	WIN	RISK	RISK	RISK	OUT		
Axolotl	Andrea Sawatzki	Actress	WIN	RISK	RISK	RISK	OUT			
Teddy	Annemarie Carpendale	Television host	RISK	WIN	(Note: Teddy gained immunity for one week due to contracting COVID and she was safe. She appeared in the next episode due to getting a negative test.)	WIN	OUT			
Phönix "Phoenix"	Samuel Koch	Actor	WIN	WIN	RISK	OUT				
Stinktier "Skunk"	Peter Kraus	Singer	RISK	RISK	OUT					
Hammerhai "Hammerhead"	Pierre Littbarski	Football manager	RISK	OUT						
Chili	Jens Riewa	Television presenter	OUT							

The masked singer won their face-off and remained in the competition.
The masked singer lost their face-off and was in the bottom four/three/two, but was not eliminated.
The masked singer was safe from elimination.
The masked singer was eliminated from the competition and unmasked upon their elimination.
The masked singer did not perform.
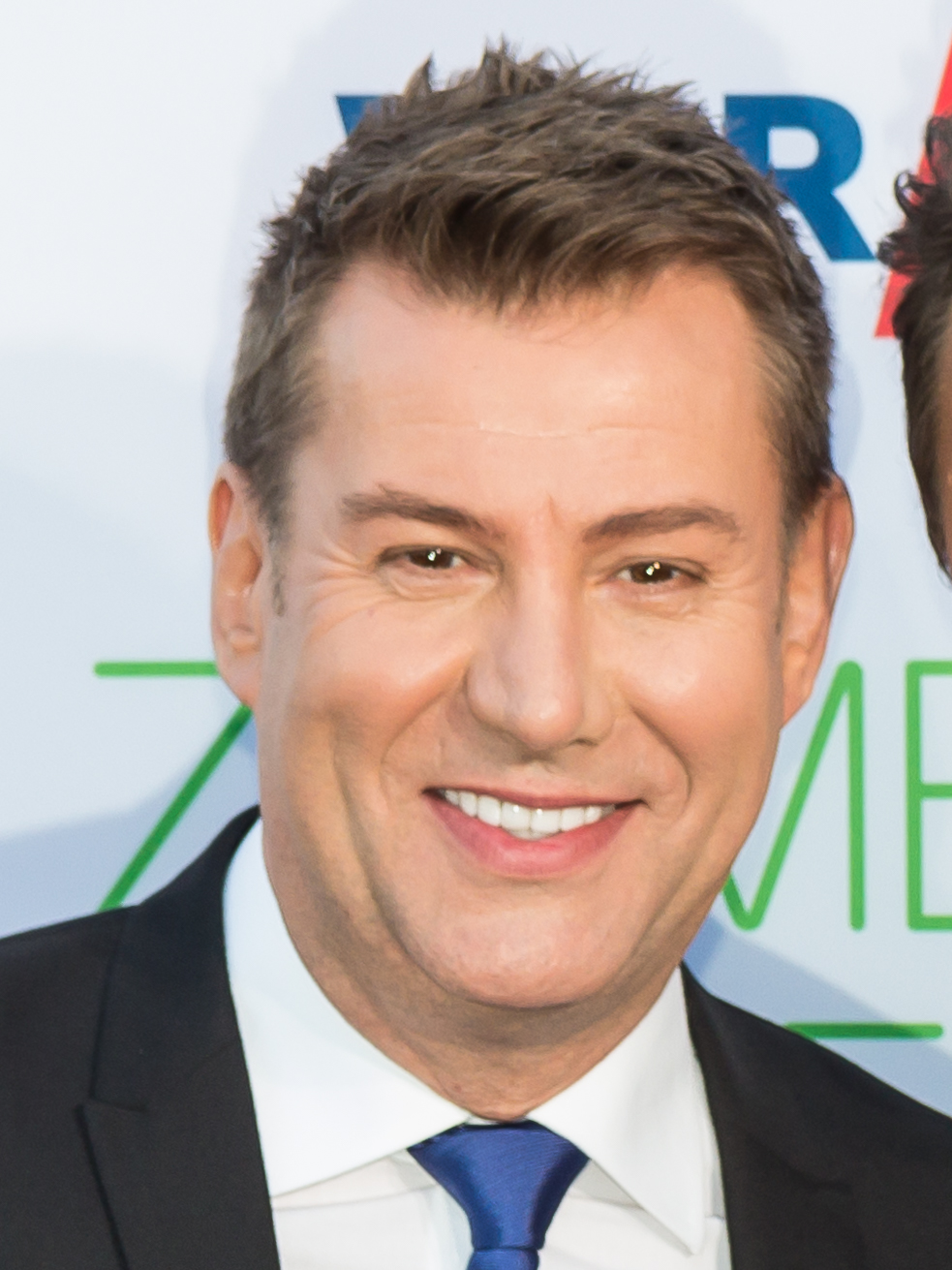
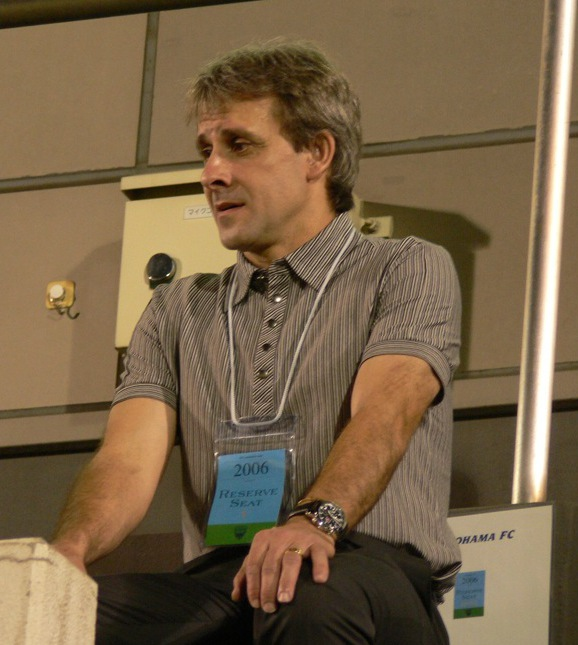
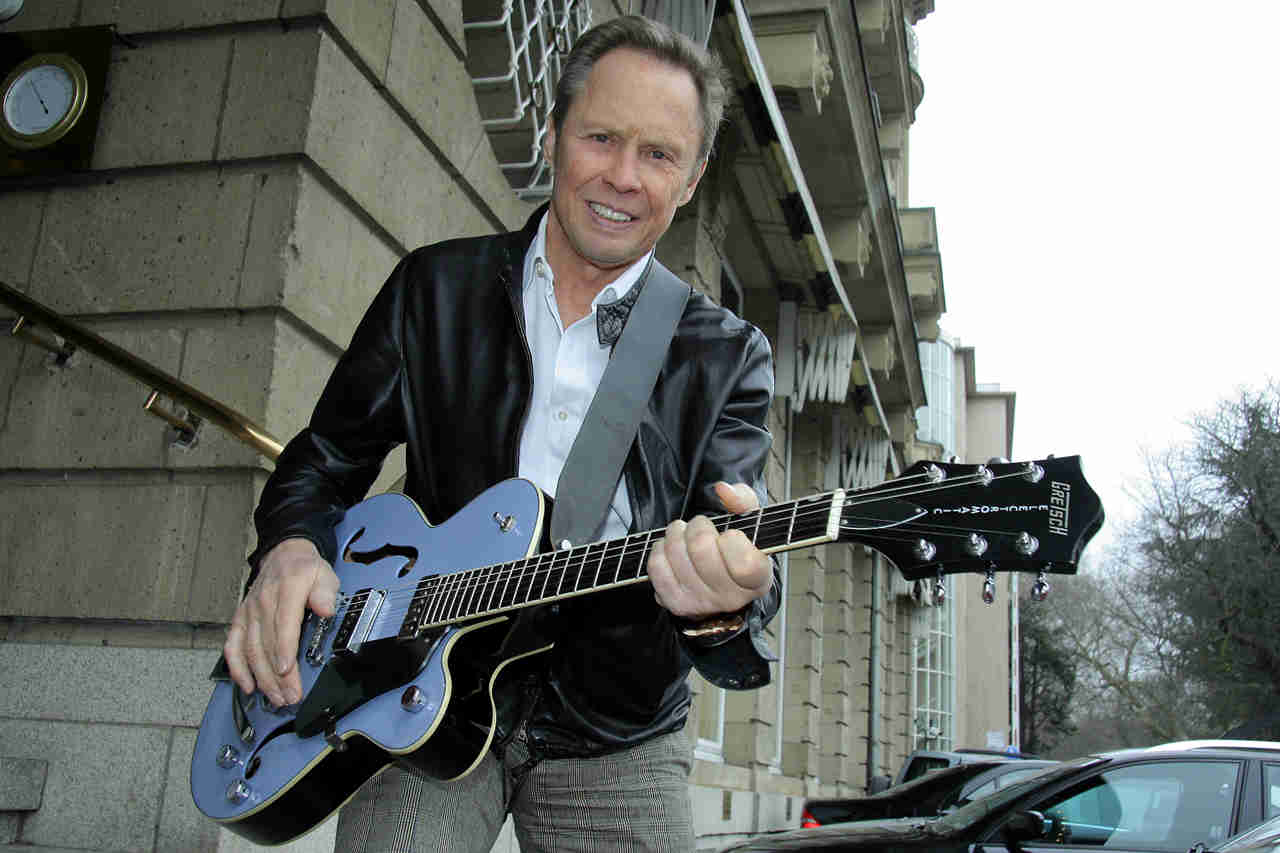
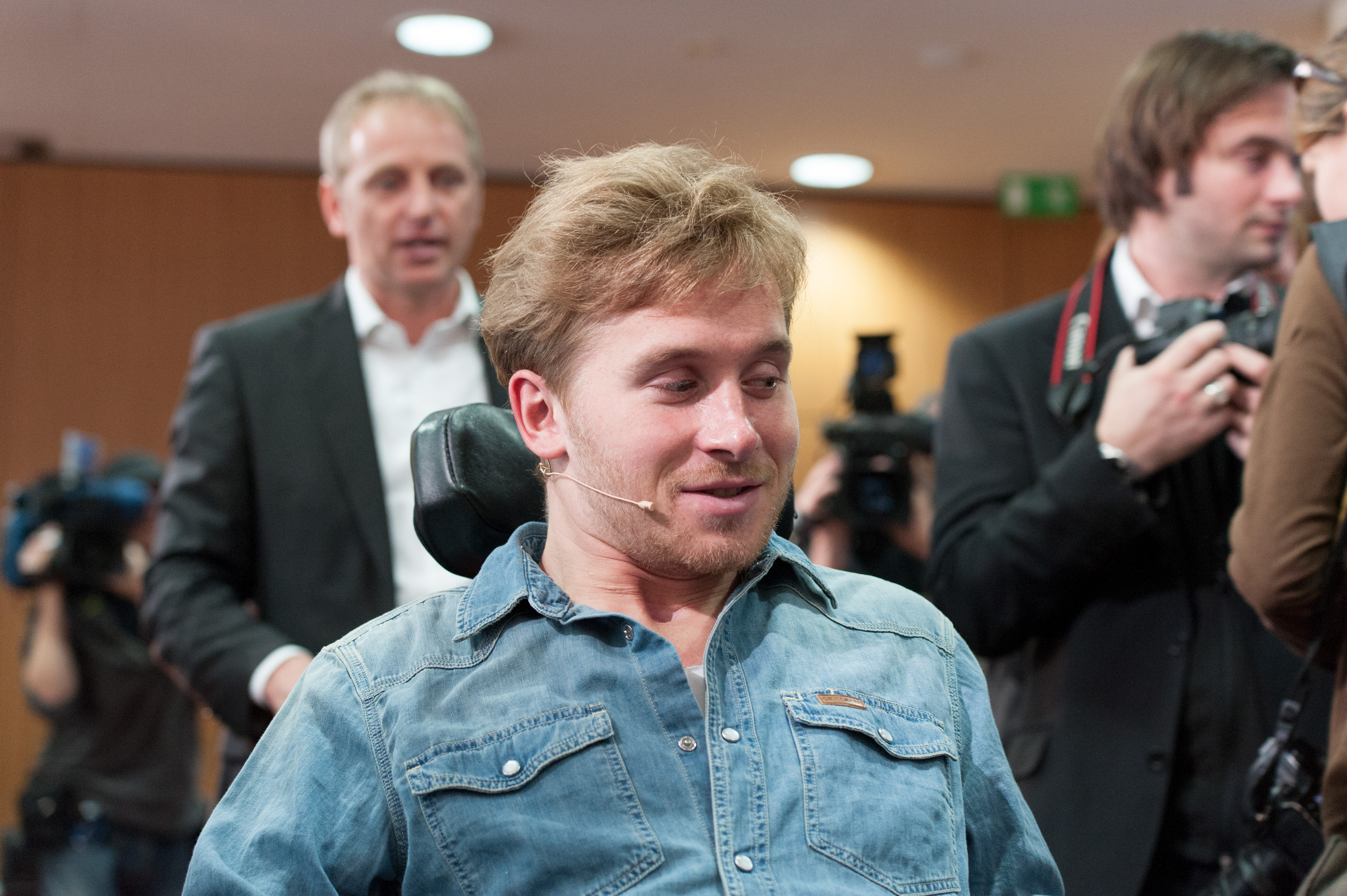
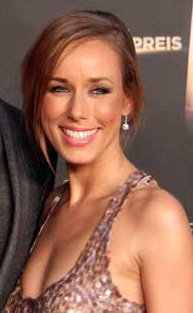
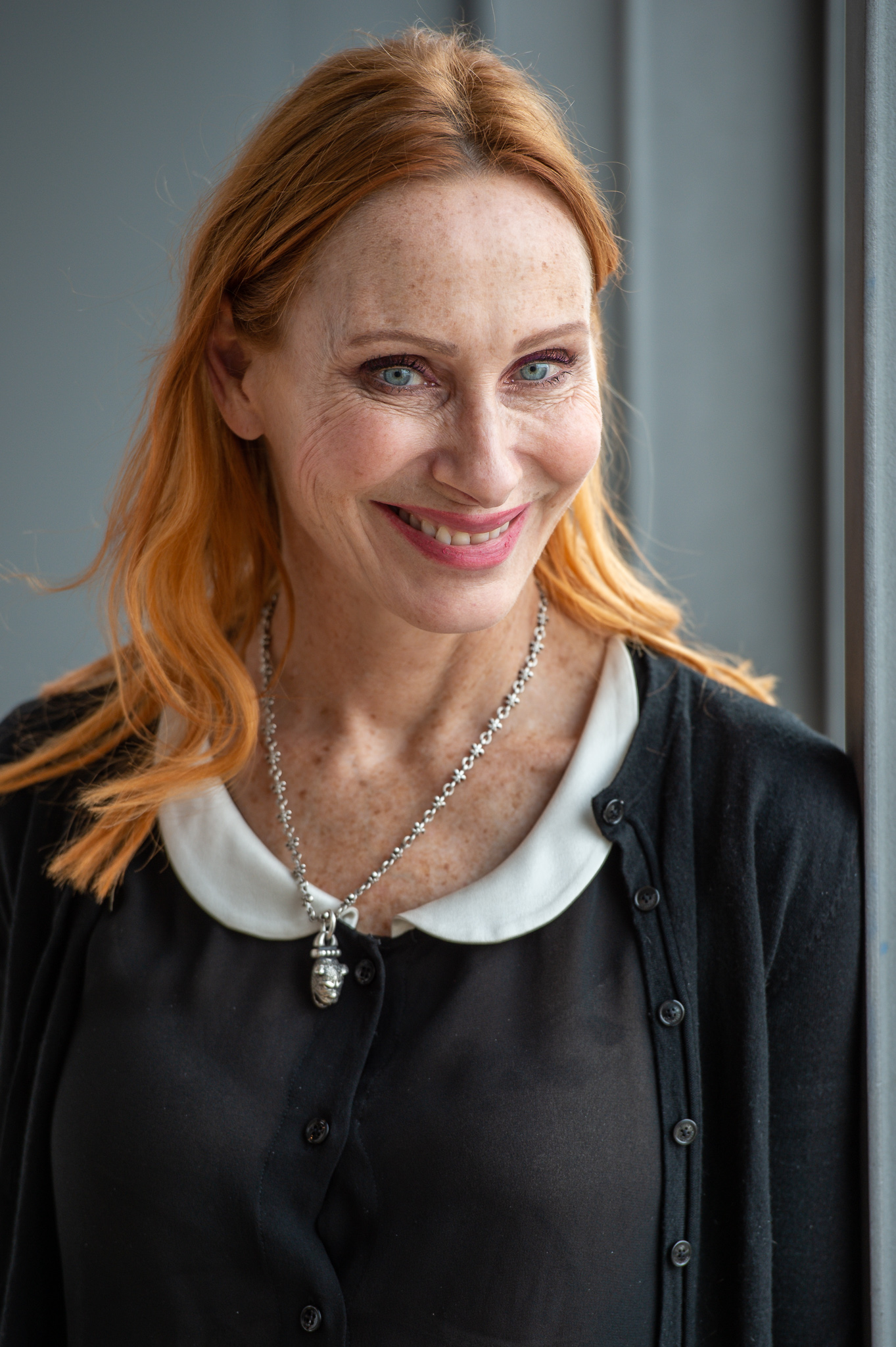
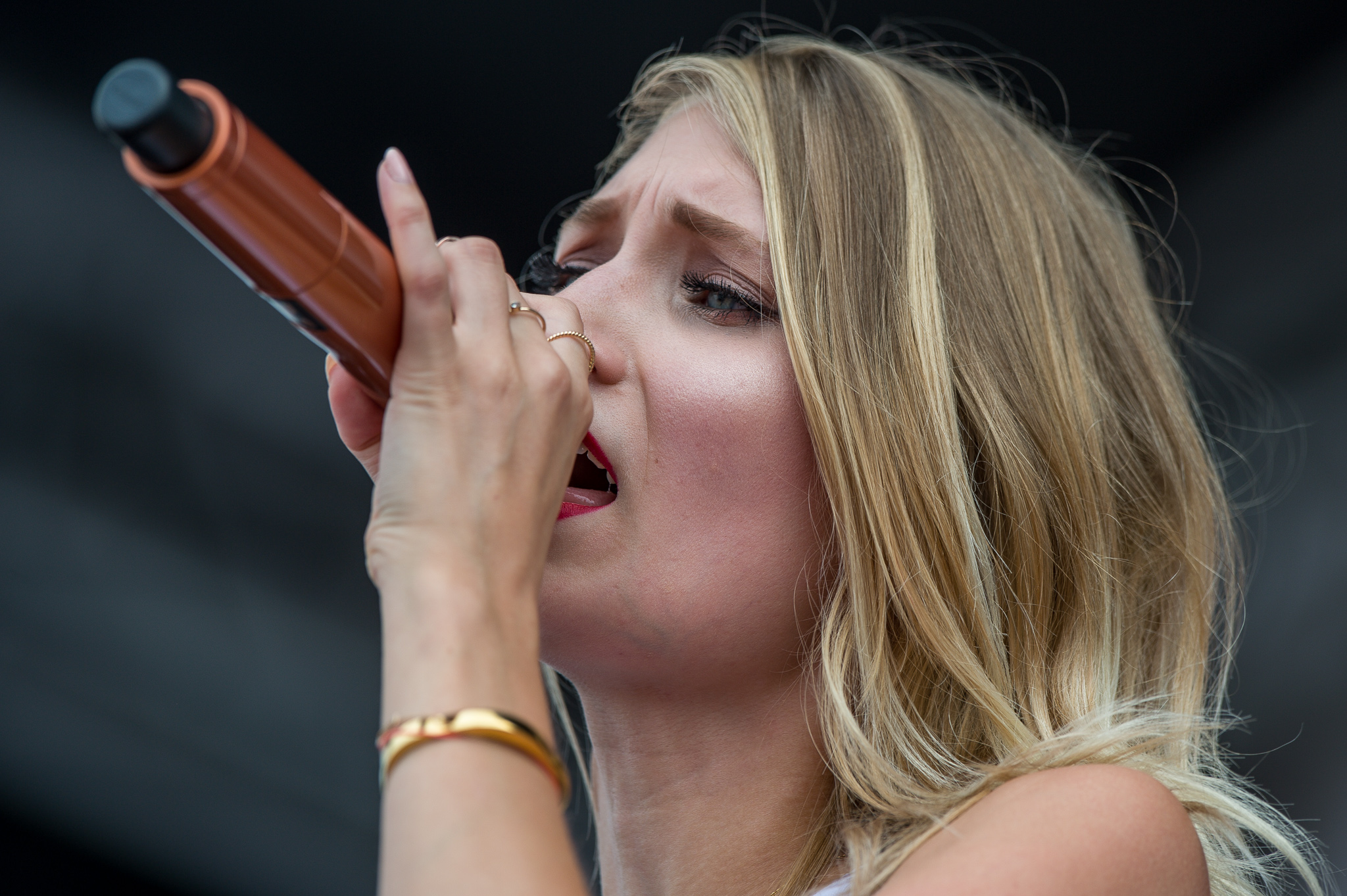
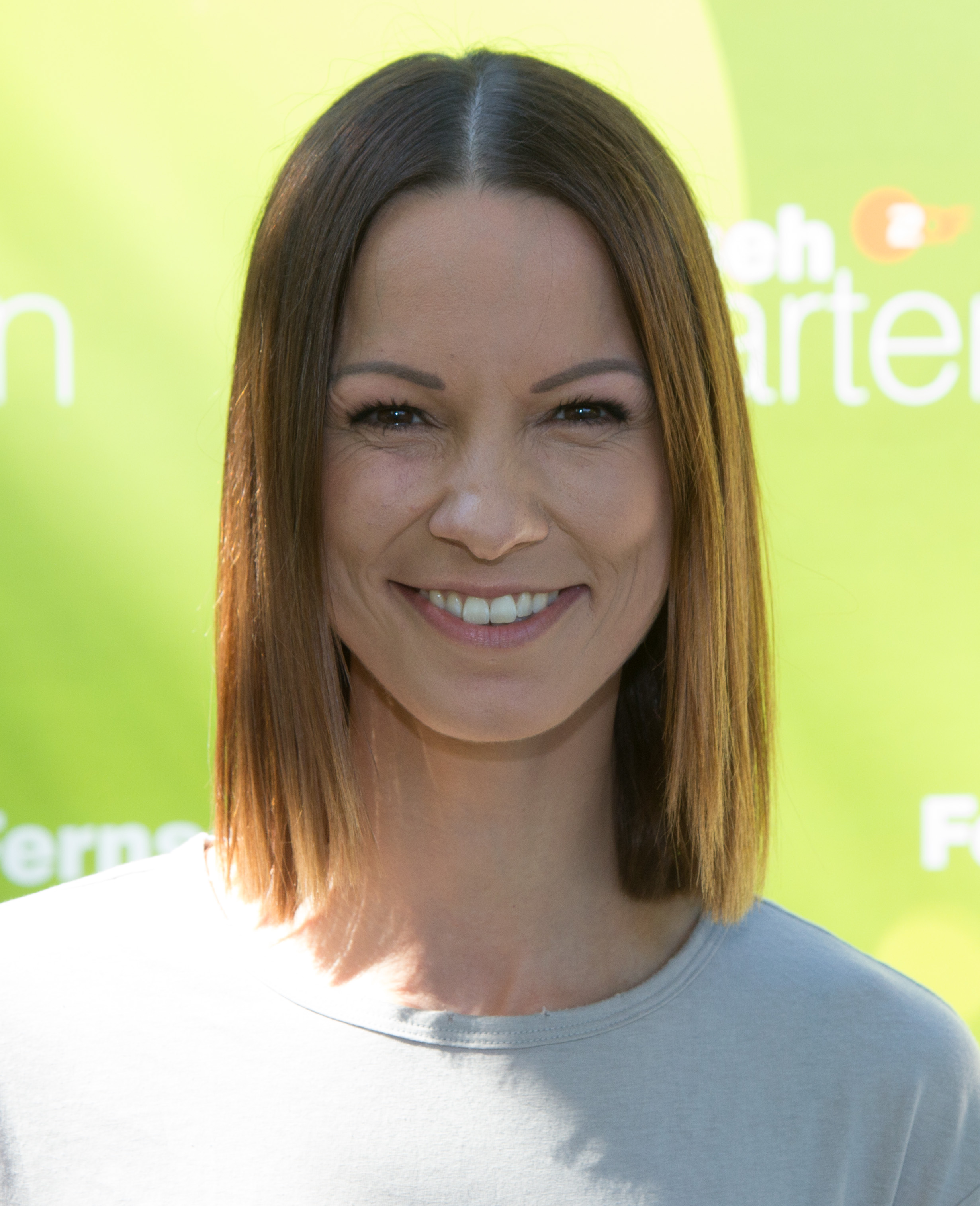
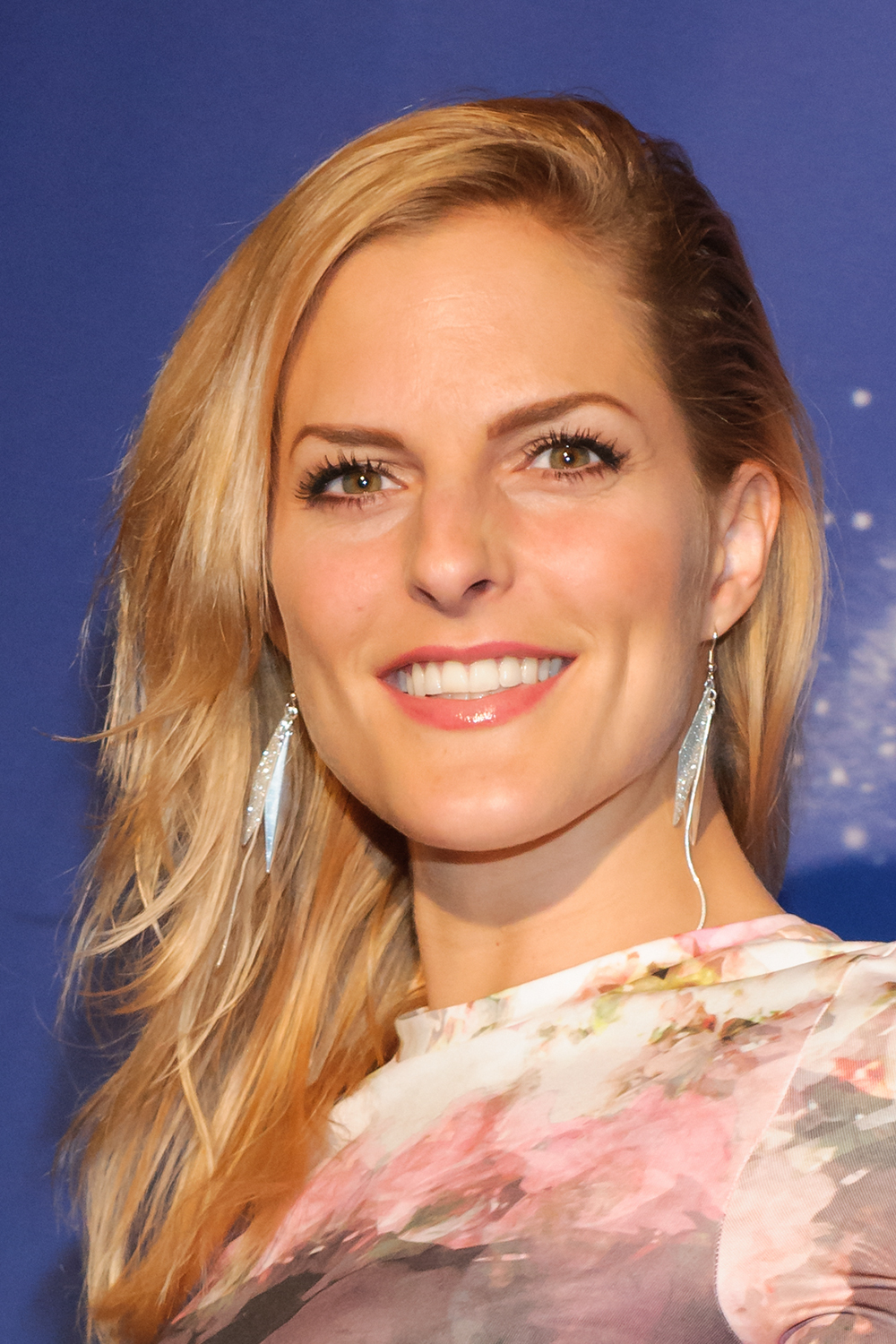
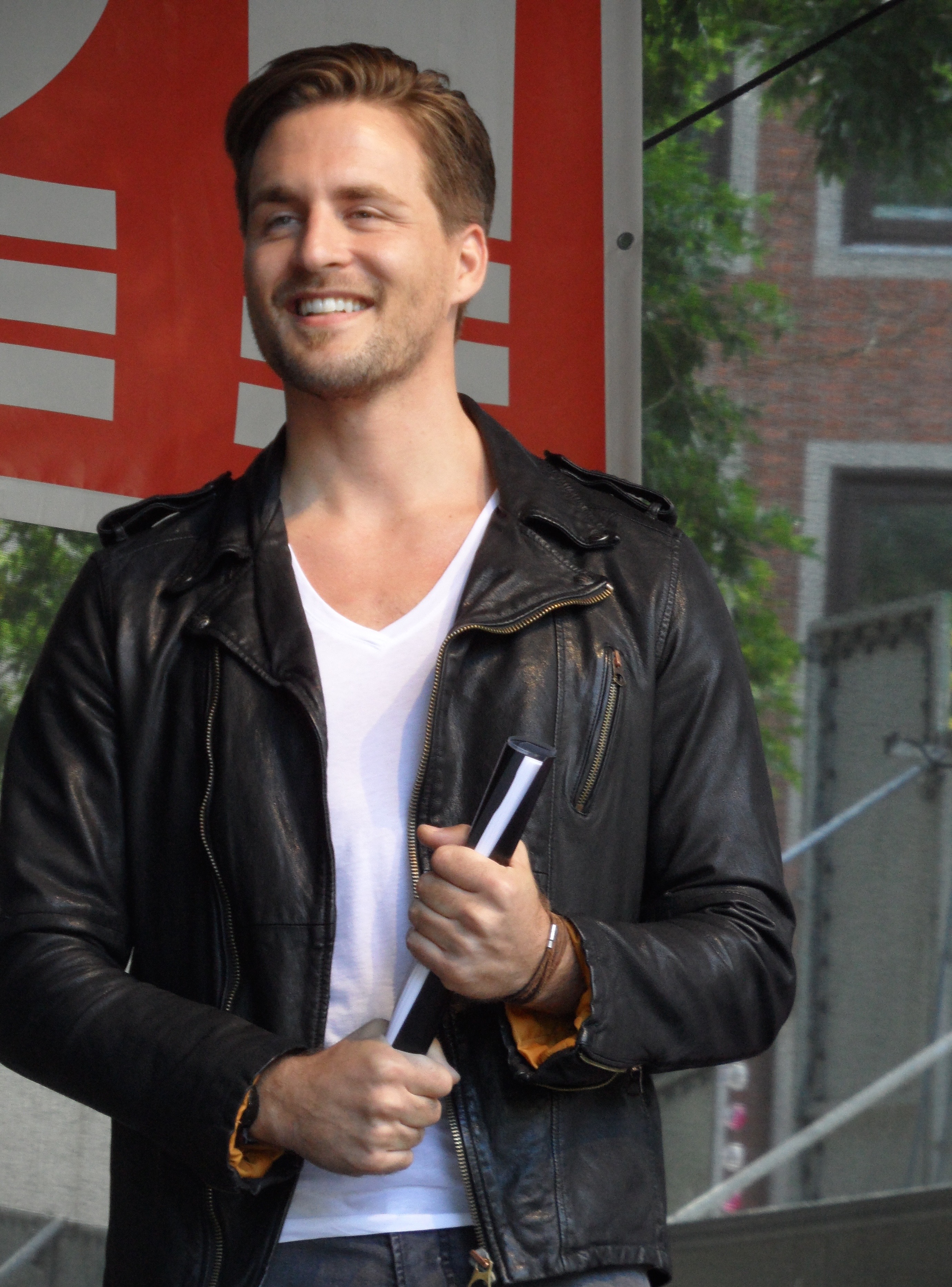
The celebrities who have competed in the fifth season of The Masked Singer, pictured in order of elimination (l-r):
Jens Riewa ("Chili"), Pierre Littbarski ("Hammerhai"), Peter Kraus ("Stinktier"), Samuel Koch ("Phönix"), Annemarie Carpendale ("Teddy"), Andrea Sawatzki ("Axolotl"), Carolin Niemczyk ("Mops"), Christina Stürmer ("Heldin"), Sandy Mölling ("Raupe"), Alexander Klaws ("Mülli Müller")

== Episodes ==
=== Week 1 (16 October) ===
Performances on the first live episode
#	Stage name	Song	Identity	Result
1	Mülli Müller	"Hot in Herre" by Nelly/"Tiny Riot" by Sam Ryder	undisclosed	WIN
2	Axolotl	"Oops!... I Did It Again" by Britney Spears	undisclosed	WIN
3	Mops	"Un-Break My Heart" by Toni Braxton	undisclosed	WIN
4	Chili	"Can You Feel It" by The Weather Girls	Jens Riewa	OUT
5	Teddy	"Lovefool" by The Cardigans	undisclosed	RISK
6	Raupe	"Proud Mary" by Ike & Tina Turner	undisclosed	WIN
7	Phönix	"Also sprach Zarathustra" by Richard Strauss/"Firestarter" by The Prodigy	undisclosed	WIN
8	Hammerhai	"Sledgehammer" by Peter Gabriel	undisclosed	RISK
9	Stinktier	"I Like Chopin" by Gazebo	undisclosed	RISK
10	Heldin	"Smells Like Teen Spirit" by Nirvana	undisclosed	WIN

=== Week 2 (23 October) ===
Performances on the second live episode
#	Stage name	Song	Identity	Result
1	Mops	"We Found Love" by Rihanna feat. Calvin Harris	undisclosed	WIN
2	Teddy	"Je ne veux pas travailler" by Pink Martini/"Alors on danse" by Stromae	undisclosed	WIN
3	Stinktier	"Black or White" by Michael Jackson	undisclosed	RISK
4	Mülli Müller	"Radioactive" by Imagine Dragons	undisclosed	WIN
5	Hammerhai	"Vamos a la playa" by Righeira/"Another One Bites the Dust" by Queen	Pierre Littbarski	OUT
6	Heldin	"I'm with You" by Avril Lavigne	undisclosed	WIN
7	Axolotl	"Good as Hell" by Lizzo	undisclosed	RISK
8	Phönix	"Imagine" by John Lennon	undisclosed	WIN
9	Raupe	"Nutbush City Limits" by Ike & Tina Turner	undisclosed	WIN

=== Week 3 (30 October) ===
Performances on the third live episode (Note: There was 7 performances instead of 8, due to the celebrity behind Teddy having to quarantine due contracting COVID. She was safe and appeared in the next episode due to getting a negative test.)
#	Stage name	Song	Identity	Result
1	Heldin	"Alive" by Sia	undisclosed	WIN
2	Axolotl	"Dream a Little Dream of Me" by Doris Day	undisclosed	RISK
3	Mülli Müller	"Bombtrack" by Rage Against the Machine/"Heal the World" by Michael Jackson	undisclosed	WIN
4	Stinktier	"Let Her Go" by Passenger	Peter Kraus	OUT
5	Phönix	"Bitter Sweet Symphony" by The Verve	undisclosed	RISK
6	Raupe	"Skyscraper" by Demi Lovato	undisclosed	WIN
7	Mops	"Love Me Tender" by Elvis Presley/"Who Let the Dogs Out" by Baha Men	undisclosed	RISK

=== Week 4 (6 November) ===
Performances on the fourth live episode
#	Stage name	Song	Result	
1	Teddy	"Around the World (La La La La La)" by A Touch of Class/"Take a Look Around" by Limp Bizkit	WIN	
2	Raupe	"The Edge of Glory" by Lady Gaga	WIN	
3	Phönix	"Somewhere Over the Rainbow/What a Wonderful World" by Israel Kamakawiwoʻole/I Have a Dream by Martin Luther King Jr.	RISK	
4	Mülli Müller	"The Power" by Snap!	WIN	
5	Mops	"Ironic" by Alanis Morissette	RISK	
6	Axolotl	"Bongo Cha Cha Cha" by Caterina Valente	RISK	
7	Heldin	"In the End" by Linkin Park	WIN	
Sing-off details			Identity	Result
1	Phönix	"Fleur De Lis" by The Raven Age/"I Can" by Nas	Samuel Koch	OUT
2	Mops	"Just the Way You Are" by Bruno Mars	undisclosed	SAFE
3	Axolotl	"I Don't Want to Grow Up" by Ramones	undisclosed	SAFE

=== Week 5 (13 November) - Semi-final ===
Performances on the fifth live episode
#	Stage name	Song	Identity	Result
1	Mülli Müller	"I Will Always Love You" by Whitney Houston	undisclosed	WIN
2	Axolotl	"Fight For Your Right" by Beastie Boys	undisclosed	RISK
3	Mops	"Drop It Like It's Hot" by Snoop Dogg ft. Pharrell Williams/"Halo" by Beyonce	undisclosed	RISK
4	Teddy	"Englishman in New York" by Sting	Annemarie Carpendale	OUT
5	Heldin	"Sunday Bloody Sunday" by U2	undisclosed	RISK
6	Raupe	"Drivers License" by Olivia Rodrigo	undisclosed	WIN
Sing-off details			Identity	Result
1	Axolotl	"Time Warp" by The Hit Crew	Andrea Sawatzki	OUT
2	Mops	"Chasing Cars" by Snow Patrol	undisclosed	SAFE
3	Heldin	"Hedonism (Just Because You Feel Good)" by Skunk Anansie	undisclosed	SAFE

=== Week 6 (20 November) – Final ===
- Group number: "Let's Get Loud" by Jennifer Lopez

==== Round One ====
Performances on the final live episode – round one
#	Stage name	Song	Identity	Result
1	Raupe	"Heavy Cross" by Gossip	undisclosed	SAFE
2	Mops	"Iris" by Goo Goo Dolls	Caroline Niemczyk	OUT
3	Mülli Müller	"Dangerous" by David Guetta ft. Sam Martin	undisclosed	SAFE
4	Heldin	"Another Day in Paradise" by Phil Collins	undisclosed	SAFE

==== Round Two ====
Performances on the final live episode – round two
#	Stage name	Song	Identity	Result
1	Raupe	"Bird Set Free"/"Unstoppable" by Sia	undisclosed	SAFE
2	Mülli Müller	"Man in the Mirror" by Michael Jackson	undisclosed	SAFE
3	Heldin	"Castle on the Hill" by Ed Sheeran	Christina Stürmer	THIRD

==== Round Three ====
Performances on the final live episode – round three
#	Stage name	Song	Identity	Result
1	Raupe	"Proud Mary" by Ike & Tina Turner	Sandy Mölling	RUNNER-UP
2	Mülli Müller	"Bombtrack" by Rage Against the Machine/"Heal the World" by Michael Jackson	Alexander Klaws	WINNER

== The Masked Singer Ehrmann Tiger ==
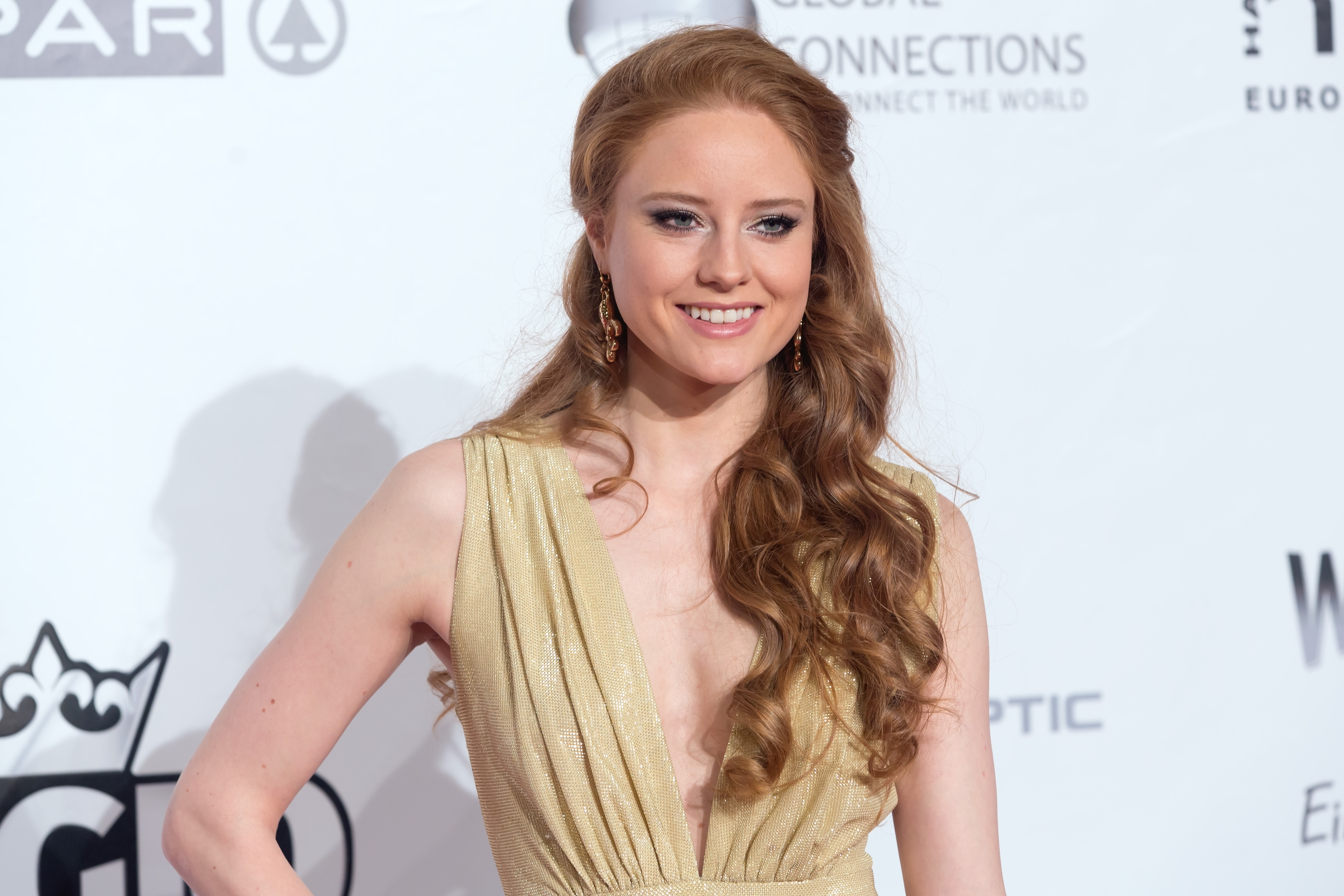
Barbara Meier, The Masked Singer Ehrmann Tiger

The Masked Singer Ehrmann Tiger is an online show as part of the fifth season of The Masked Singer. For the first time, a mask appears exclusively online. A performance video is to be put online every Saturday and an evidence video every Tuesday. The unmasking also took place online on 20 November 2021.

Performances
Episode	Date	Stage name	Celebrity	Notability	Song
1	16 October 2021	Tiger	Barbara Meier	Model	"Saturday Night" by Whigfield
2	23 October 2021	Tiger	Barbara Meier	Model	"Eye of the Tiger" by Survivor
3	30 October 2021	Tiger	Barbara Meier	Model	"Wannabe" by Spice Girls
4	6 November 2021	Tiger	Barbara Meier	Model	"Watermelon Sugar" by Harry Styles
5	13 November 2021	Tiger	Barbara Meier	Model	"Lucky" by Britney Spears
6	20 November 2021	Tiger	Barbara Meier	Model	"Blue (Da Ba Dee)" by Eiffel 65

== Reception ==
=== Ratings ===
Episode	Original airdate	Timeslot	Viewers (in millions)		Share (in %)		Source
Episode	Original airdate	Timeslot	Household	Adults 14-49	Household	Adults 14-49	Source
1	16 October 2021	Saturday 8:15 pm	2.96	1.63	11.3	24.1	
2	23 October 2021	Saturday 8:15 pm	2.79	1.56	10.7	24.1	
3	30 October 2021	Saturday 8:15 pm	2.72	1.47	10.6	24.2	
4	6 November 2021	Saturday 8:15 pm	2.20	1.12	7.1	12.8	
5	13 November 2021	Saturday 8:15 pm	3.03	1.76	11.4	25.1	
6	20 November 2021	Saturday 8:15 pm	3.25	1.77	12.3	25.6	
Average			2.83	1.55	10.6	22.7	
