= Marialia Pacitto =

Italian-American fashion designer

- Born: Torrance, CA
- Other name: Lia
- Occupations: Fashion Designer, Costume Designer, Creative Director, Entrepreneur
- Known for: Los Angeles Fashion Week, Lady Gaga G.U.Y. video, Founder and owner of Marialia, Ethical Fashion Movement
- Website: www.marialia.com

Marialia Pacitto is an Italian-American fashion designer from Los Angeles. Pacitto's collections were presented seasonally by Project Ethos's Los Angeles Fashion Week.

== Early life ==
Marialia Pacitto was born in Torrance, California, a suburb beach town in Los Angeles County. Coming from Italian descent, Pacitto was raised back and forth for 17 years between her hometown and her second home in a small town outside of Rome, Italy. She attended American public school and graduated in 2007. Having a lifelong interest in fashion and zero knowledge about the industry, Pacitto finally decided to become a fashion designer in her third year of high school, establishing her self-titled brand 'Marialia' and launching MarialiaXo.com (now Marialia.com) in 2006.

== Career ==
On March 19, 2010, Pacitto exhibited her first ready-to-wear collection at Los Angeles Fashion Week. For the following years, Pacitto continued to expand her brand and show her collections regularly at Los Angeles Fashion Week. As popularity and sales grew, the brand gained more exposure once grabbing the attention of some well-known celebrities. In 2011, after being featured on CocoPerez.com (Perez Hilton's fashion blog), Pacitto's clothing was seen on rapper Chanel West Coast. Throughout this time, Pacitto continued to pursue other elements of the industry such as wardrobe styling and costume design, later leading her to style music videos and create custom costume and couture pieces for artists like Tyga, Flo Rida, Chanel West Coast, Bebe Rexha, and Lady Gaga. Pacitto also filmed a segment and was featured as a well-known American fashion designer on popular German TV reality show Auf Und Davon on VOX. Her 2014 collection and fashion week showcase was covered on an episode that aired nationwide and online on April 13, 2014. During this period, Pacitto also participated in The Dream Builder's Project for various charity events and was a regular attendee and special guest supporter for their annual charity gala benefiting Children's Hospital of Los Angeles.

== Retailers ==
During 2011-2015, Pacitto also sold her brand in retailers including Karmaloop, and Dolls Kil.l Marialia was one of the first brands to be carried by Dolls Kill in 2011, being dubbed by the retailer as a "hard-to-find brand."

== Lady Gaga G.U.Y. video ==
In March 2014, Lady Gaga released her video for the song "G.U.Y.", which Pacitto was asked to create custom pieces for. The custom designs were for a specific scene in the video, which featured Gaga floating on an Egyptian-inspired canal boat with muscular lifeguards surrounding her. Working with Gaga's team on the concept, Pacitto handmade 6 pairs of gold wing arm floaties in a 48 hour time frame to be worn by the male models. This has been stated to be an original design idea of Lady Gaga herself. After the release of the video, the custom gold wing arm floaties received a lot of attention online from bloggers dedicated to Lady Gaga fashion. On March 28, 2014, the gold wing arm floaties were featured in "The G.U.Y. Hotel", an exhibit created by Lady Gaga at trendy hotel The Out NYC.

== Ethical/sustainable fashion ==
In 2015, as Pacitto's interest in sustainable fashion began to grow, she partnered with Helpsy, a current for-profit B Corp with an environmental mission to recycle clothes, for their online e-commerce shop. At the time, Helpsy was one of the first ethical fashion e-commerce websites. A year later, Buzzfeed named Helpsy one of the 14 best places to shop sustainably while featuring Pacitto's swimsuit design. As Pacitto re-branded and continued to shift her designs toward being more sustainable, she received mentions in articles from ethical fashion sites including The Fashion Law and NerdDNA."Already costuming well known celebrities and churning out ready to wear, [Marialia Pacitto] hand makes her entire collection ethically in the USA." In 2017, Pacitto took a hiatus from her regular collection as she explored new avenues of design and studied textiles, pattern making, graphic design, and photography. The following year, Pacitto launched Private Client to deal with limited-run production services for other brands and independent designers. Continuing with her education on the ethics of fashion, Pacitto re-emerged years later with her Spring Summer 2021 Collection- the first Ready-to-Wear line from the designer in 5 years. This collection made its debut on ASOS Marketplace as one of the first independent designers from Los Angeles carried by the UK-based retailer. Pacitto also won their AW21 Homepage Competition which featured the brand on their marketplace homepage for the Autumn/Winter 2021 season.
