= Iran Zendan =

Iranian movie

Iran Zendan (Iran Prison) is a feature film by Daryush Shokof about the situations of political prisoners currently in Iran. The film is a semi-documentary picture with images taken from the actual events during the mass protests of the 2009 Iranian presidential election and what happens to some of protesters after they are incarcerated. Iran Zendan was first screened in Babylon theatres in Berlin, Germany on May 9, 2010.

Scriptwriter/producer/star Daryush Shokof was kidnapped by 4 terrorists in the city of Cologne in May 2010 and was kept for over 12 days. He was kidnapped for having made 2 films, Iran Zendan and Hitler's Grave and was told to stop releases of both movies or else he would be killed. Shokof has been under close protection from German police forces ever since his release. He has since made Iran Zendan available free of charge on the internet

== Cast ==
- Daryush Shokof
- Mahnaz Talebitari
- Hossein Daryani
- Hasan Demirci
- Mehtap Yigit-Özer
- Sivan Salim
- Jahangir Bordjian
- Stefanija Basargina
- Pedram Shoushi
- Tuna Erol
- Marcia Moraes
- Murat Demirci
- Fardi Demirci

== Production ==
The film was produced by Daryush Shokof, and Shahin Shokoofandeh in Berlin, Germany.
