= Schwarzkopf & Schwarzkopf Verlag =

German publishing house

Schwarzkopf & Schwarzkopf Verlag GmbH
- Company type: GmbH
- Genre: Publishing house
- Founded: 1992
- Founder: Oliver Schwarzkopf
- Headquarters: Berlin, Germany
- Products: Books
- Website: www.schwarzkopf-verlag.net

The Schwarzkopf & Schwarzkopf Verlag is a German publishing house founded in 1992 by Oliver Schwarzkopf in Berlin. It includes popular non-fiction and picture books as well as the woman erotic series ANAIS, named after the French writer Anaïs Nin.

== Program ==
Schwarzkopf & Schwarzkopf primarily publishes lifestyle literature which seeks the proximity to the youth scene. This becomes evident in unauthorized biographies of, for example, Justin Bieber, Taylor Swift and Robert Pattinson. However, the publisher also works directly with various celebrities. The musicians Clueso and Udo Lindenberg, presenter Gunther Emmerlich or athlete Claudia Pechstein were all involved in the publications of the publishing house. It also published the first book Glamourgirl of the actress and columnist Sara Schätzl.

Schwarzkopf & Schwarzkopf became known by its Lust & Liebe series. These books contain each 33 short stories which deal mainly with sex.
