= Die Bienen – Tödliche Bedrohung =

2008 film

- Official television poster
- Written by: Nicole Bujard; Ulli Bujard; Frank Raki; Annette Simon
- Directed by: Michael Karen
- Starring: Janin Reinhardt; Stephan Luca; Sonja Kirchberger; Rolf Kanies
- Theme music composer: Siggi Mueller
- Country of origin: Germany
- Original languages: German; English; French

Production
- Producers: Hendrik Feil; Martin Kircher
- Cinematography: Jochen Stäblein
- Editor: Stefan Essl
- Running time: 90 minutes
- Production company: Wasabi Film

Original release
- Release: 16 October 2008

Die Bienen – Tödliche Bedrohung (English: Killer Bees) is a 2008 German television horror film directed by Michael Karen and stars Janin Reinhardt, Rolf Kanies, and Sonja Kirchberger.

== Plot ==
When Karla brings her father Hans to a clinic in Mallorca because he was stung by a bee, it does not look good for him. The doctors insist that he suffered a normal bee sting, but Karla is convinced otherwise. Together with the researcher Ben she sets out to find the real cause of her father's condition. They find oversized bees, which are also extremely aggressive. This new insect species is a major threat to thousands of people on the holiday island.

== Cast ==
- Janin Reinhardt as Karla Bergmann
- Klaus J. Behrendt as Hans Bergmann
- Stephan Luca as Ben Herzog
- Rolf Kanies as Dr. Alvarez
- Sonja Kirchberger as Susanna Bergmann
- Paula Schramm as Maria Bergmann
- Patrick von Blume as Dr. Salazar
- Peter Benedict as Commissario Barocha
- Daniela Eck as Touristin
- Julian Bastida as Tierarzt
- Silva Gonzales as Flaschenwerfer (Wirft Flasche auf 'Bienenboot')
- Fabian Joest Passamonte as Polizist El Guardia Gomez
- Sarah Runge as Freundin des Flaschenwerfers
- Paco Colombàs as Hernán

== Production ==
The film was shot in only 23 days in Mallorca.

== Release ==
The film aired on 16 October 2008 as a television film on Sat 1. In France it was released on 1 October 2009 as direct-to-DVD project as L'Île des abeilles tueuses. Killer Bees was given a US DVD release in June 2010 over Maverick Entertainment.

== Soundtrack ==
The score was composed by the Bavarian film composer Siggi Mueller.
