= Rolf Kanies =

German actor (born 1957)

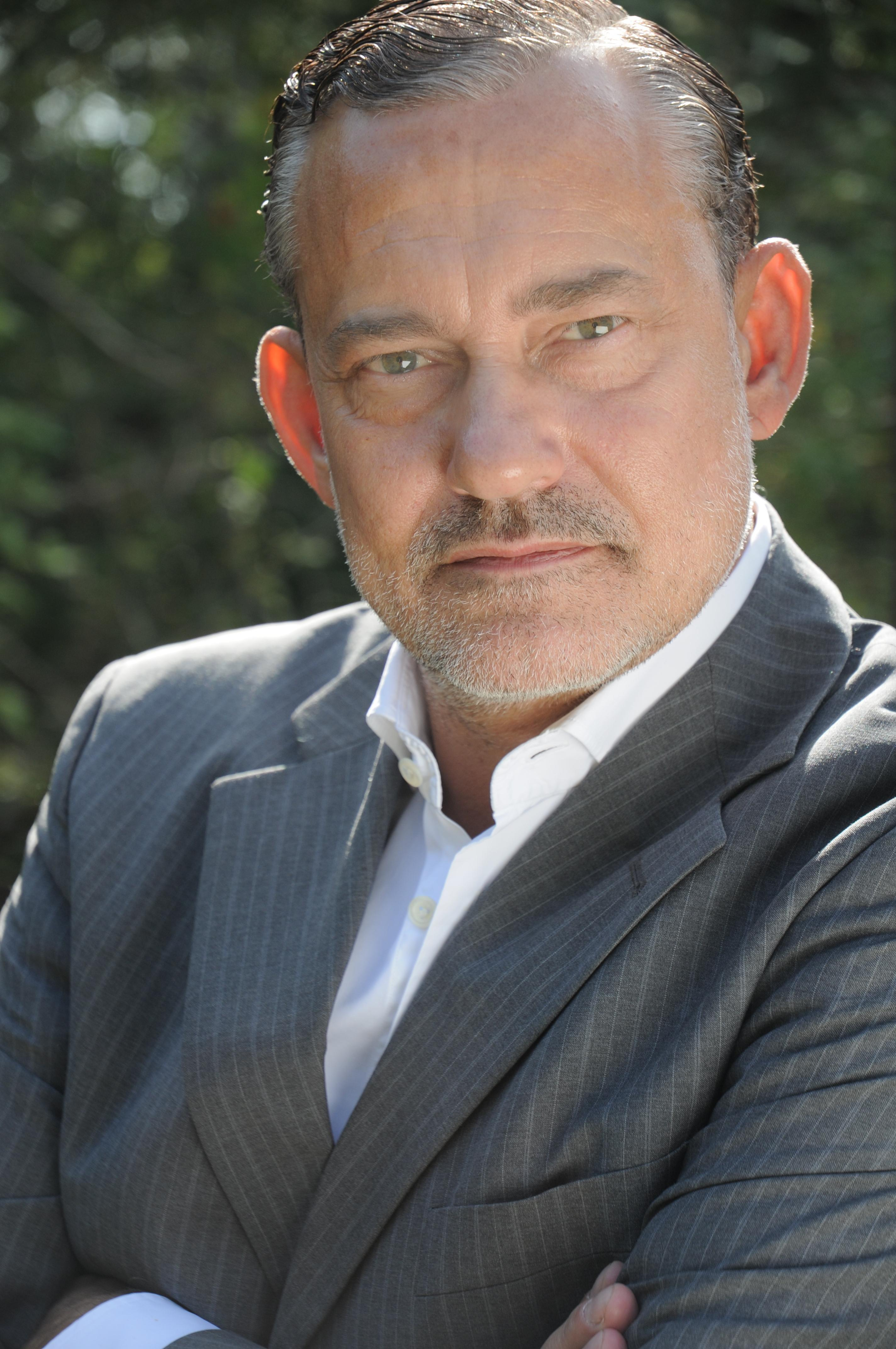
- Kanies in 2009
- Born: 21 December 1957 (age 68); Bielefeld, West Germany
- Other names: Ralph Kaines, Rolf Kanis
- Occupation: Actor
- Years active: 1979–present

Rolf Kanies (born 21 December 1957) is a German actor who played many high-profile roles on the stage before switching to a career in film and television in 1997. Since then Kanies has specialized in German and international film and television. Movies he has played in have been nominated for a variety of international awards, including an Oscar.

== Early life and education ==
Born in Bielefeld, Kanies studied at the Westfälische Schauspielschule Bochum and at the Universität der Künste (UdK) Berlin. Upon completing his studies, he embarked on a career in the theatre. His first engagement was at the Hebbel-Theater in Berlin, followed by other works at the Schauspielhaus Bochum, the Staatstheater Kassel and productions in Krefeld, Neuss, Cologne, Weimar, Graz (Austria), Basel (Switzerland) and at the Garsington Opera Festival (Oxford, England).

== Career ==
Kanies' roles have included many Shakespearean characters such as Hamlet, Romeo, Mercutio, Macbeth, Theseus/Oberon (A Midsummer Night's Dream), Sir Toby (Twelfth Night), Dromio of Ephesus (A Comedy of Errors) and Lucio (Measure for Measure). Other prominent roles were those of Faust, Orest (Iphigenia) and Biff (Death of a Salesman).

He also played several lead roles in musicals.

Starting in the 1990s, Kanies played in a large variety of German television series and movies and in eight feature films. His film debut was Dark Days, directed by Margarethe von Trotta. In 1998, Rolf had his first international appearance in the science fiction series Lexx, in which he played Reginald J. Priest, a troubled alien who is also the President of the United States. In the same year Kanies played Adolf Hitler in the American production Joe and Max directed by Steve James (STARZ! Pictures). In 2004, Kanies performed the role of Gen. Hans Krebs in Oliver Hirschbiegel's Downfall, which was nominated for an Oscar. In 2008, he played the war veteran Friedrich Hoch in A Woman In Berlin, directed by Max Färberböck, which won the Best International Feature Award at the Santa Barbara International Film Festival in 2009. In 2008 Rolf also appeared in the movie The Countess as Count Krajevo, a film by Julie Delpy.

== Filmography ==
=== Film ===
- 2000: Mister Boogie
- 2001: No Regrets - Daniel's Father
- 2002: Joe and Max - Adolf Hitler
- 2003: Falling Grace - George
- 2004: Der Untergang - General Hans Krebs
- 2006: The Conclave - Cardinal Bessarion
- 2008: The Lord of Edessa - Eric Malik
- 2008: A Woman in Berlin - Friedrich Hoch
- 2008: 10 Sekunden - Ebi Koch
- 2009: The Countess - Count Krajevo
- 2009: Für Miriam - Martin Fleißer
- 2011: A Family of Three - Jürgen
- 2011: Wunderkinder - Oberst Tapilin
- 2011: Blissestraße - Anton
- 2014: Sapphire Blue - William de Villiers
- 2015: Hitman: Agent 47 - Dr. Delriego
- 2016: Emerald Green - William de Villiers
- 2017: The Young Karl Marx - Moses Hess
- 2018: The Silent Revolution - Wardetzki

=== Television ===
- 1999: Days of Darkness - Rolf
- 1999: Countdown at Sea - Kapitän zur See van Bergen
- 2000: Der Mörder in Dir - Herr Kowalsky
- 2001: Rent a Baby - Vermieter Herr Wagner
- 2001: Wilsberg: Wilsberg und der Mord ohne Leiche - Herbert Schering
- 2002: Alibis for Sale - Arbeitsamtberater
- 2002: Joe and Max - Adolf Hitler
- 2002: Inspektor Ringo Rolle - Top oder Flop - Dr. Alexander Brombeck
- 2002: Lexx - Reginald J. Priest
- 2003: Der Fussfesselmörder - Professor
- 2003: Novaks Ultimatum - Staatssekretär Schuster
- 2003: Tatort - Atlantis - Peter Radke
- 2004: Kommissar Rex: "Nachts im Spital - Dr. Ballak
- 2004: Eva Blond - Emre Aslan
- 2004: München 7 - Mann am Rathausturm
- 2005: Mutter aus heiterem Himmel - Norbert Neumann
- 2005: Eine Liebe in Saigon - Werner Krantz
- 2005: Secret Love: The Schoolboy and the Mailwoman - Matthias Reinhardt
- 2005: Tatort - Im Alleingang - Heiko Eckermann
- 2006: Tatort - Der Lippenstiftmörder - Professor Klammroth
- 2006: Rapture of the Deep - Steve
- 2006: A Pirate's Heart - Martin Degenhard
- 2006: Storm Tide - Prosecutor Dr. Edgar Fink
- 2007: The Hunt for Troy - Georgios Vimbos
- 2007: KDD – Kriminaldauerdienst - Verwirrungen - Reimer
- 2007: Love on Loan - Uli
- 2007: Polizeiruf 110 - Tod in der Bank - Walter Conrad
- 2008: Heat Wave - Ministerpräsident Julius Schäfer
- 2008: Bible Code - Andreas Imhof
- 2008: Das Geheimnis im Wald - Reibold
- 2008: Die Bienen – Tödliche Bedrohung - Dr. Alvarez
- 2008: Die Patin – Kein Weg zurück - Lautenschläger
- 2009: The Author of Himself: The Life of Marcel Reich-Ranicki - Onkel Jakub
- 2009: Das Paradies am Ende der Welt - Harry
- 2009: Eine Liebe in St. Petersburg - Boris Wronski (uncredited)
- 2009: Die kluge Bauerntochter - Hofrat von Müller
- 2009: Mein Flaschengeist und ich - Nidelöpfel
- 2009: Auftrag in Afrika - Van Heusen
- 2010: Blackout - Dr. Thomas Reinders
- 2010: Alpha 0.7 - Der Feind in dir - Uwe Gonzoldt
- 2010: Das Familiengeheimnis
- 2011: No Man Is an Island - Vollmer
- 2012: Rommel - Oberst Eberhard Finckh
- 2013: George - Ernst Stahl-Nachbaur
- 2014: The Ingredients of Love - Monsieur Chagall

== Theater ==
- 1979 Schauspielhaus Bochum
- 1981 Schauspielhaus Bochum
- 1981 Hebbeltheater Berlin
- 1982–1986 Schauspielhaus Graz
- 1991 Schauspielhaus Bochum
- 1996–1997 Staatstheater Kassel
- 1997 RLT Neuss
- 1998 OD-Theater Basel "Don Carlos"
- 1998 Kunstfest Weimar " Sturm und Drang"
- 1999 Garsington Opera Festival "Entführung aus dem Serail"
- 2000 Schauspiel Berlin "Warten auf Godot"
