= Seven Servants =

- Directed by: Daryush Shokof
- Written by: Daryush Shokof; Juliane Schulze
- Produced by: Bahman Maghsoudlou; Stefan Jonas
- Starring: Anthony Quinn
- Narrated by: John Wojda
- Cinematography: Stefan Jonas
- Edited by: Henry Richardson
- Music by: Gato Barbieri
- Release date: 1996
- Running time: 88 minutes
- Country: Germany
- Language: English

Seven Servants is a 1996 English-language German comedy-drama film directed by Daryush Shokof and written by Daryush Shokof and Juliane Schulze. The film is about a man named Archie, portrayed by Anthony Quinn, who wishes to unite and "connect" the races until his last breath.

The film premiered at the 1996 Locarno Film Festival.

== Plot ==
A wealthy old man named Archie hires seven servants of both sexes and different races to get connected to him by plugging his body openings and remain connected to him until his last breath. The servants are to stay connected to the old man's body for the next ten days. They eat, sleep, and even use the bathroom and fight thieves together.

The party for Archie's reunion with old friends is a lavish one. It includes the once love of his life (Hilda), the one and only true friend he ever had, and the Opera singer plus the maid. The servants overcome many difficulties by staying "united which is the core reason for the whole ritual". The best friends are asked to fill up the remaining openings of his body. Hilda is set upon him to do the final act of love between the two of them, something they never ever did though they have loved each other most of their lives. She commits to the act.

A character played by David Warner is subjected to a ritual where his bodily openings are sequentially sealed by surrounding figures. An opera singer completes the act by performing a vocal piece while sealing his mouth with a kiss, asphyxiating him. The narrative frames his death as the tragic culmination of his pursuit of racial unity.

The plot is in actuality Shokof's own manifest of yekishim with which he believes the human beings have only come to earth to unite both in heart and mind. Archie ascends to the heavens while his round bed turns in circle and joins the skies and the stars in the universe peacefully. Unification prevails amongst the servants even though it is just a bodily experience and through him as the catalyst.

== Cast ==
- Anthony Quinn
- David Warner
- Alexandra Stewart
- Sonja Kirchberger
- Audra McDonald
- Johnathan Staci Kim
- Reza Davoudi
- Ken Ard
- Gerald Moore

== Music ==
Gato Barbieri composed the music for the film.

== Reception ==
American Cinematographer wrote that it "presents a truly eccentric premise ... Seven Servants' Iranian born director, Daryush Shokof, is a former painter whose experimental art videos were, he admits, 'too conceptual or philosophical to win mainstream acclaim.' This video work, however, gave him tremendous freedom to experiment with the camera, framing and lighting techniques that he applied to his first celluloid project."

David Rooney of the magazine Variety wrote, "If it didn't lapse midway into monotony, Seven Servants might have made its mark as a camp classic of high-art folly. This twaddle about an oldster drawing on youth and vitality by having an ethnically balanced bunch of hired hands jam their fingers in his ears and nostrils is just an elaborately embroidered account of going out with a bang."

MovieWeb wrote, "In this film from Iranian director Daryush Shokof, Anthony Quinn plays an elderly man who wants to exit earth in a state of unity with all creatures. To that end, he hires a quartet of manservants to plug his facial orifices with their fingers. Not your typical solution, but it seems to work for Archie (Quinn), who moves through the rest of the film thus connected. Audra McDonald appears in the final moments to sing a "death aria" into his mouth."

After Quinn's death, Contactmusic.com quoted Quinn as saying that Seven Servants was "really a film for the 21st century". According to them, Quinn felt that the film was "too visionary" and should be withheld from release until the 21st century. Referring to the film's delayed release, they said that it was "worth the wait".
