= Jens Riewa =

German television news presenter (born 1963)

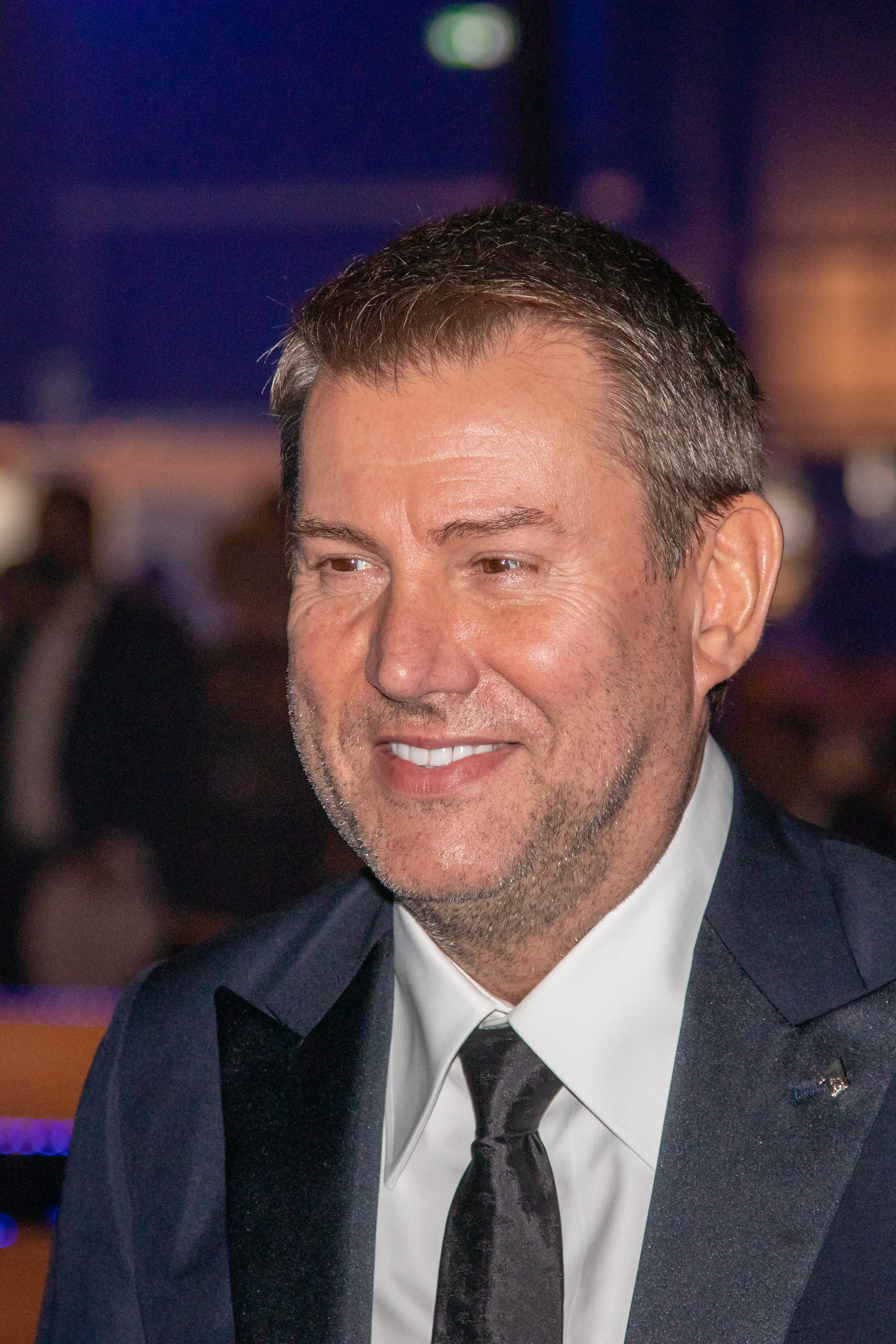
- Riewa in 2021
- Born: 2 July 1963 (age 62); Lübben, East Germany
- Occupations: News presenter; journalist
- Known for: Anchorman at the ARD

Jens Riewa (born 2 July 1963) is a German television presenter and broadcast news analyst for the Tagesschau, a programme produced by the German broadcaster ARD.

== Childhood and youth ==
Jens Riewa grew up in Lübben. He did his Abitur in Lübben in 1982. After this he spent a prolonged three years' military service with the National People's Army.

== Professional training ==
After having given up his studies for building industry technology at the Verkehrshochschule in Dresden, he underwent training as an air traffic controller. Then he was trained in voice work, as well as presenting for radio at the Berliner Rundfunk for two years.

== Career ==
In 1988 he passed an application test for a position as a broadcast news analyst for the DFF. After that, he worked for the youth radio DT 64. After doing voice roles for radio dramas, features, documentaries, and commercials between 1988 and 1991, the former chief presenter Werner Veigel took him to the Tagesschau in 1991 – initially Riewa was heard there as a voice actor, followed by a position as a broadcast news analyst from 1994 onwards. Since 6 September 1995, he has been the presenter of the main edition of the Tagesschau at 8 pm.

In 1994 Dieter Thomas Heck discovered him as a television presenter for the Deutsche Schlagerparade, after Birgit Schrowange had given up presenting the broadcast after only one year. Riewa also presented the German qualifications for the Eurovision Song Contest in 1996 and 1997.

In 2021, he competed in The Masked Singer Germany's fifth season as The Chili and took home 10th place.

== Private life ==
In 1998, after recurring rumours, Riewa stated that he was not gay. He succeeded in suing two publishers for 15.000 DM compensation after they had proclaimed him as homosexual. He faked an affair with German singer Michelle in 2002. His confessions about sexual intercourse with her annoyed his employer ARD, which he then apologised for, so it did not lead to any consequences.
