= Ken Ard (dancer) =

American actor and dancer (born 1960)

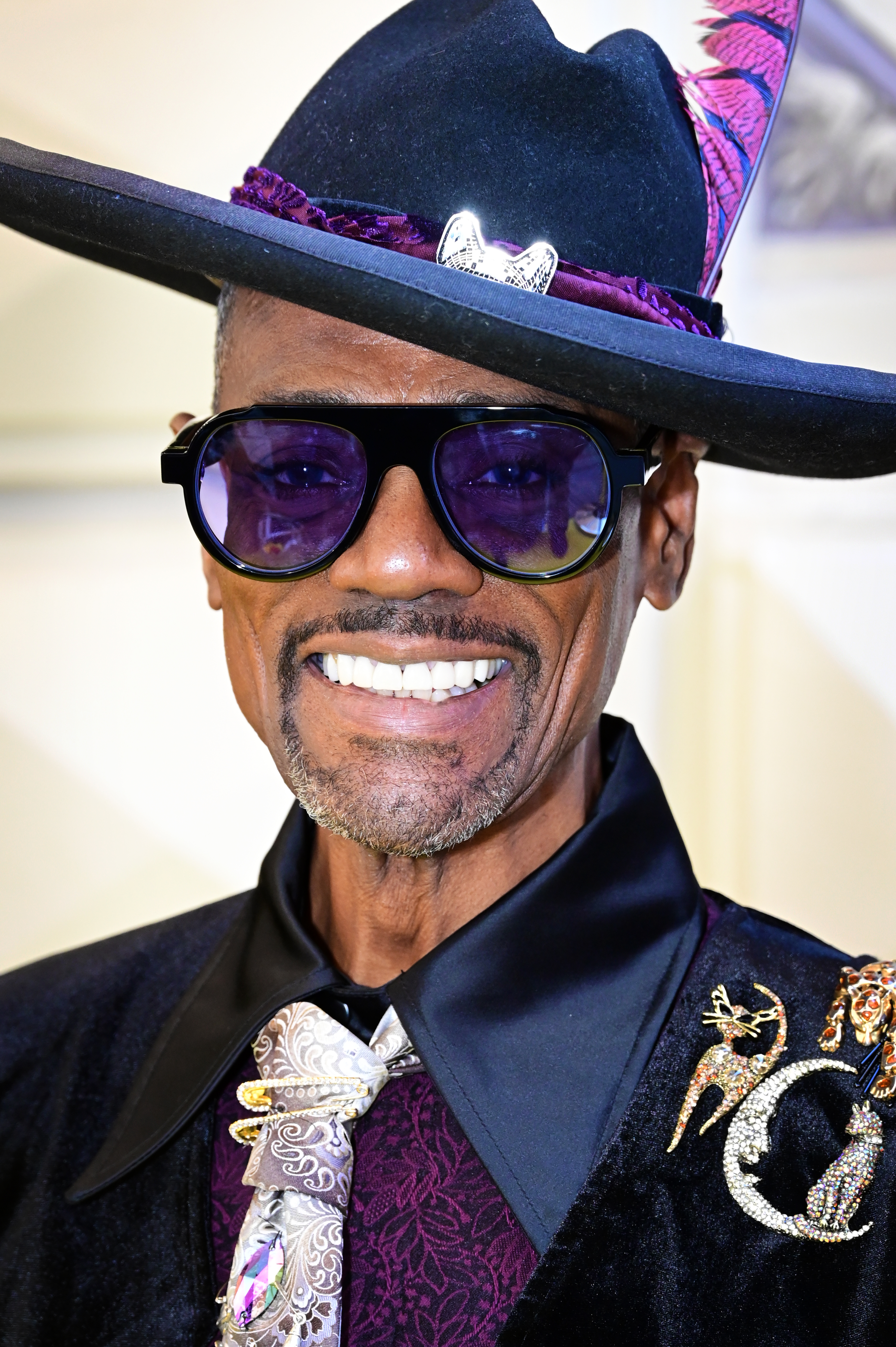
- Ard in 2026
- Occupations: Dancer; choreographer; actor; singer

Kenneth D. "Ken" Ard (born June 30, 1960) is an American dancer, choreographer, actor and singer.

== Early career ==
Ard was born in Oakland, California in 1960. His mother exposed him to jazz through frequent visits to musical in San Francisco and Oakland. Ard also proved to be an especially good gymnast, winning the California youth gymnastics championship at 16.

After dancing at the Oakland Ballet and San Francisco Ballet, he was approached by Jon Hendricks for a lead role in his show, Evolution of the Blues, to be presented in the Golden Gate Theatre in San Francisco.

== Personal life ==
He is openly gay and married to puppeteer Basil Twist

== Career ==
Ard was asked to choreograph for shows in Hawaii. When Alvin Ailey came to Hawaii, he asked Ard to dance in his American Dance Theater. But after a few months, Ard missed the dynamic of the combination of song and dance, and auditioned for a Broadway show for which he was selected, Cats (in which he originated the role of Macavity), Starlight Express (in which he originated the role of Electra), Song and Dance, Jelly's Last Jam and Smokey Joe's Cafe.

Ard appeared in the 2002 film Chicago and 1996 film Seven Servants. by Daryush Shokof.

Ard collaborated with many of Europe's notable jazz artists. The beginning of 2009 marked the release of Ballads, Blues & Cocktails, Ard's first jazz CD.

Ard teaches jazz dance and musical dance at the Frank Sanders Musical Academy and Codarts in the Netherlands. Since 2014, he has also taught at the Alvin Ailey American Dance Theater.

In 2026, Ard joined the cast of Cats: The Jellicle Ball in the role of DJ Griddlebone.

== Filmography ==
=== Film ===
Year	Title	Role	Notes
1996	Seven Servants	African Man	
2002	Chicago	Wilbur	

=== Television ===
Year	Title	Role	Notes
2018	New Amsterdam	Mason	Episode: "Every Last Minute"
2020	Stars in the House	—N/a	Episode: "Smokey Joe's Cafe Reunion"
2020	Wait in the Wings	Electra	Episode: "The Painful Spectacle of Starlight Express"
