= Janin Ullmann =

German television presenter and actress

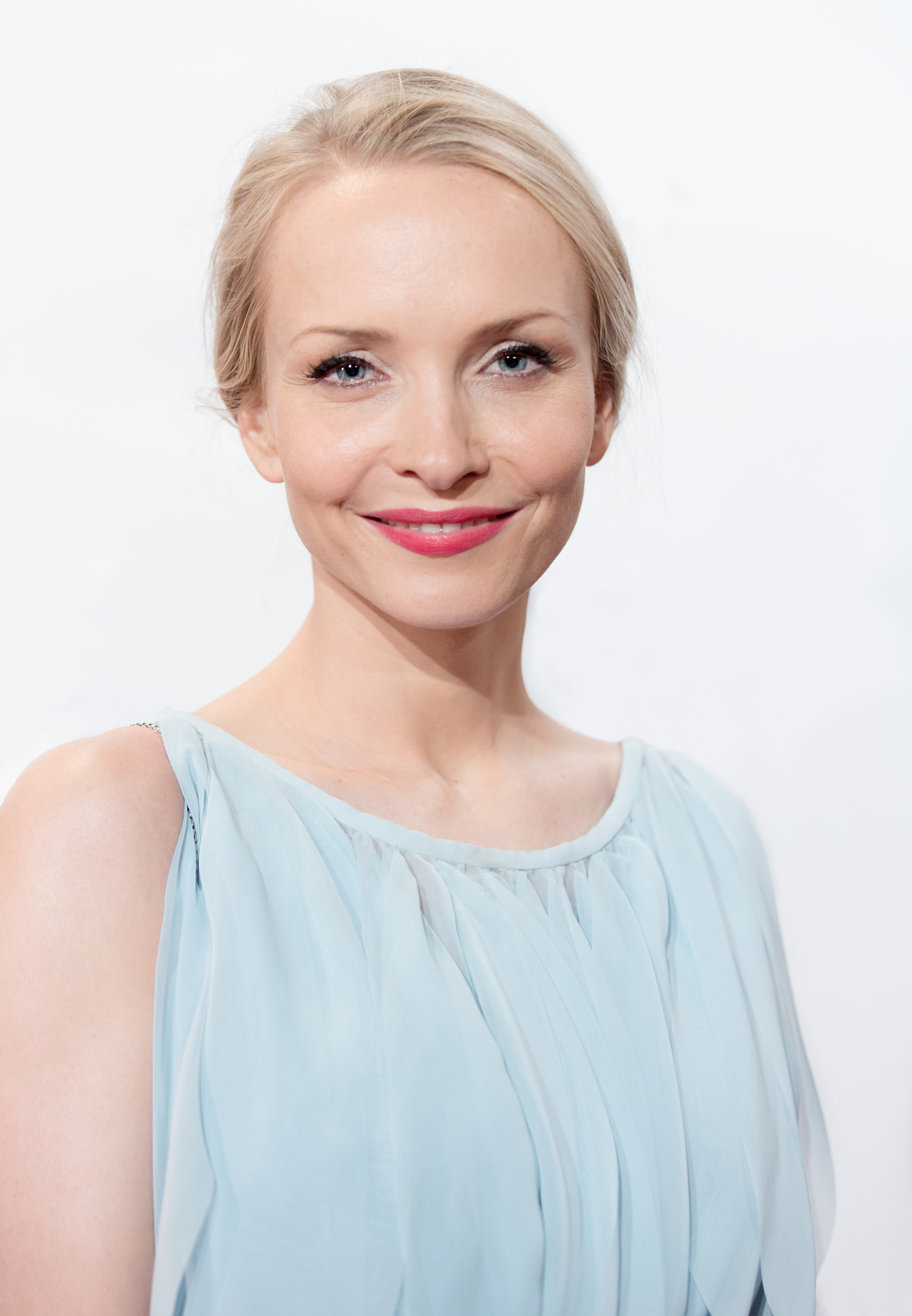
- Ullmann in 2016
- Born: Janin Reinhardt; 14 November 1981 (age 44); Erfurt, East Germany
- Occupations: TV presenter, actress
- Years active: 2000s–present
- Website: janin-ullmann.de

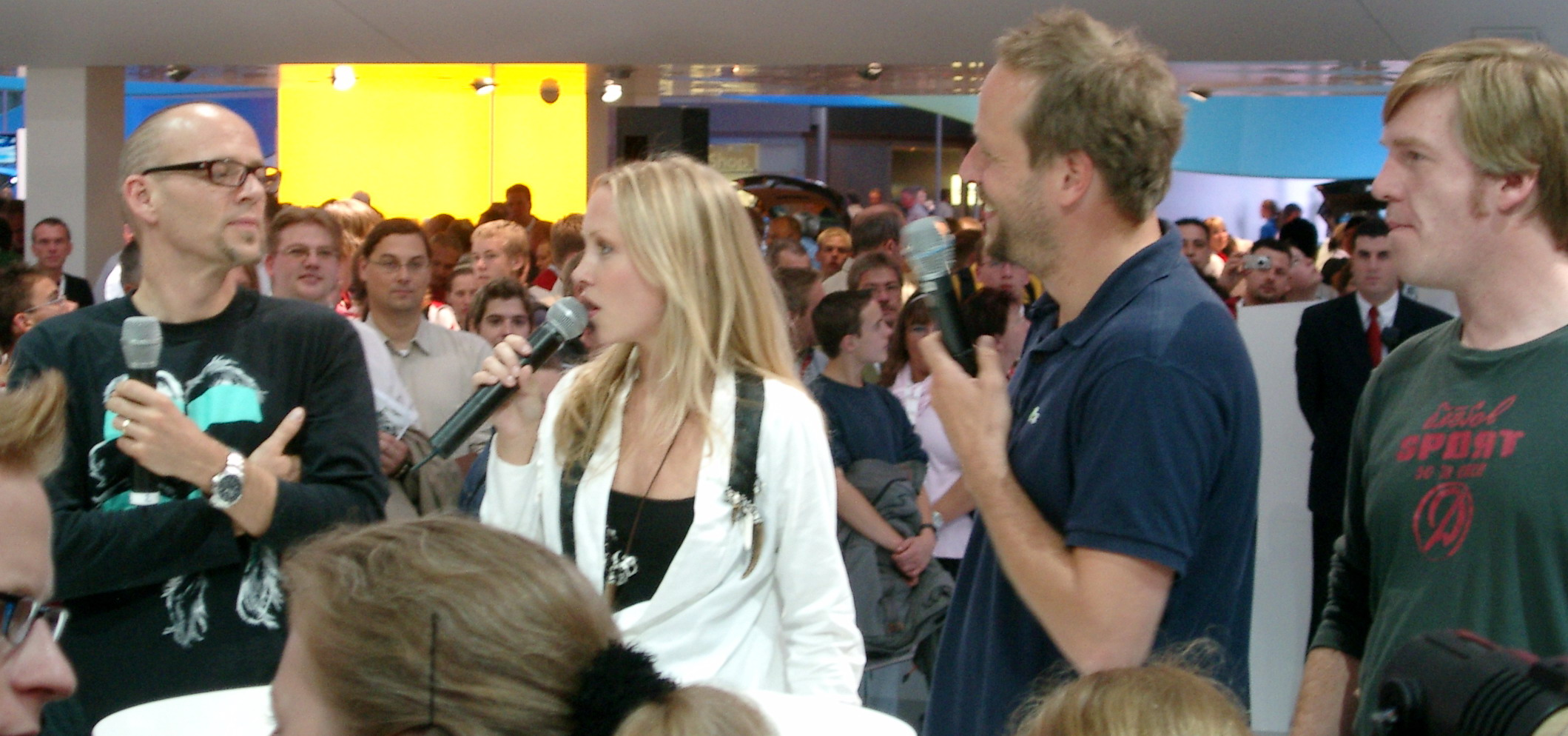
Ullmann interviewing hip-hop group Fantastischen Vier (Thomas D, Smudo, and And.Ypsilon)

Janin Ullmann (née Reinhardt; born 14 November 1981) is a German television presenter and actress.

== Career ==
Ullmann participated in a casting of the German music channel VIVA. She was chosen from 3,000 participants and became the host of Interaktiv. Since then, she hosted several television shows, such as Inside, Film ab, Star Search – Das Magazin, Top of the Pops, Bravo Super Show, the Bundesvision Song Contest 2006 (with Stefan Raab), and several TV total specials.

=== Acting ===
Ullmann acted in Was nicht passt, wird passend gemacht, short film Mittsommer (2005) at Internationale Filmschule Köln, comedy show PAARE on Sat.1, twice in Die ProSieben Märchenstunde as Rapunzel, and played the lead role in the supernatural horror film Die Bienen – Tödliche Bedrohung.

Ullmann is known for her performance as Lotta and Alex in the telenovela Lotta in Love.

== Personal life ==
Ullmann was married to German actor Kostja Ullmann between 2016-2018, whom she began dating in 2008. Based on her individual-feminist attitude, she founded the podcast Female Finance in 2022, which campaigns for women's financial independence.
