= Lotta in Love =

- Starring: Janin Reinhardt
- Country of origin: Germany

Lotta in Love is a German television series.

== See also ==
- List of German television series
