= Auf und davon – Mein Auslandstagebuch =

- Country of origin: Germany

Original release
- Network: VOX
- Release: 16 April 2007

Auf und davon – Mein Auslandstagebuch (English: Up and Away - My Diary Abroad) is a German documentary television series, broadcast on VOX since 16 April 2007. The television series is in the format of docu-soaps covering young people who leave for the first time in their lives their family, friends and home to spend some time in foreign countries. The participants relate their experiences and impressions with a handheld camera.

== Plot ==
The TV series belongs to the docu-soap format. In the series Auf und davon – Mein Auslandstagebuch (Up and Away - My Diary Abroad), VOX accompanies young people who leave their families, friends and home country for the first time in their lives to spend some time abroad. It also accompanies teenagers or young adults who are visiting Germans for a few months. The participants record their experiences and impressions with a handheld camera.

== See also ==
- List of German television series
