= Daryush Shokof =

- داریوش شکوف
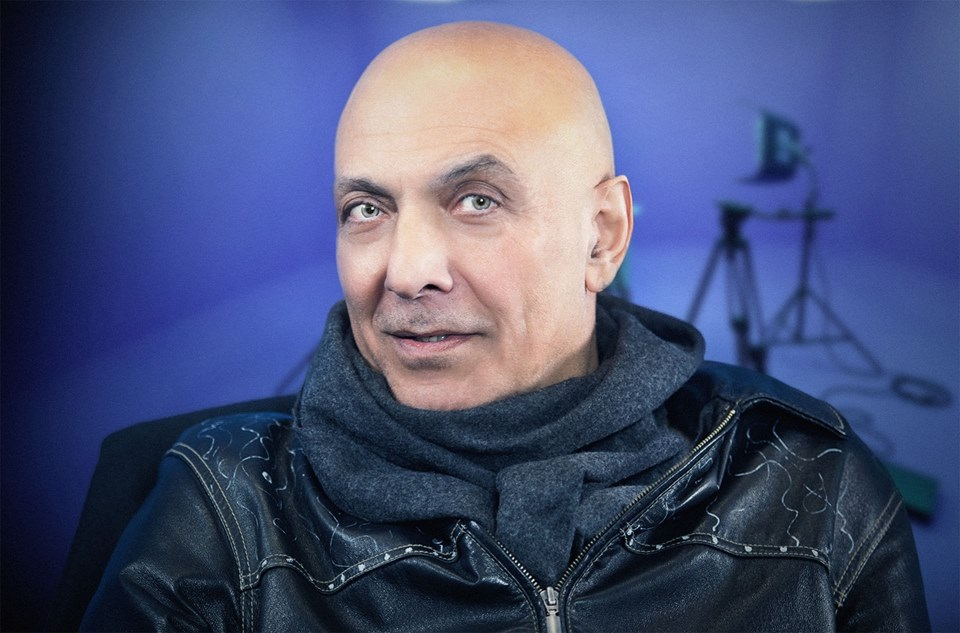
- Born: Ali Reza Shokoufandeh; 25 June 1954 (age 72); Tehran, Imperial State of Iran
- Occupations: Artist, filmmaker
- Years active: 1990s–present

Daryush Shokof (Persian: داریوش شکوف, born 25 June 1954) is an Iranian writer, film director, artist and film producer based in Germany. His first feature film was Seven Servants which featured Anthony Quinn in one of his last roles.

== Biography ==
Shokof was born as Ali Reza Shokoufandeh on 25 June 1954 in Tehran, Imperial State of Iran. He graduated from Eastern New Mexico University with a degree in Physics and Mathematics and later received an MBA from University of Dallas in Texas. In 1985, he moved to Germany and became a vocal critic of the Islamic Republic.

=== Alleged kidnapping ===
In late May 2010, around the release of his film Iran Zendan, Shokof said that he was kidnapped by four Arabic-speaking men in the city of Cologne, Germany, and was kept for over twelve days. German police said they could not confirm his story, and speculated it might have been staged to attract attention.

== Awards and nominations ==
Year	Award	Category	Work	Result	Ref.
1996	Locarno Film Festival	Best Feature Film	Seven Servants Golden Leopard Nominated		
2007	New York International Independent Film and Video Festival	Best International Director of a Feature Film	Breathful	Won	
2011	New York International Independent Film and Video Festival	Best International Director of a Feature Film	Hitler's Grave	Won	
