= Razor's Edge: The Legacy of Iranian Actresses =

Film directed by Bahman Maghsoudlou

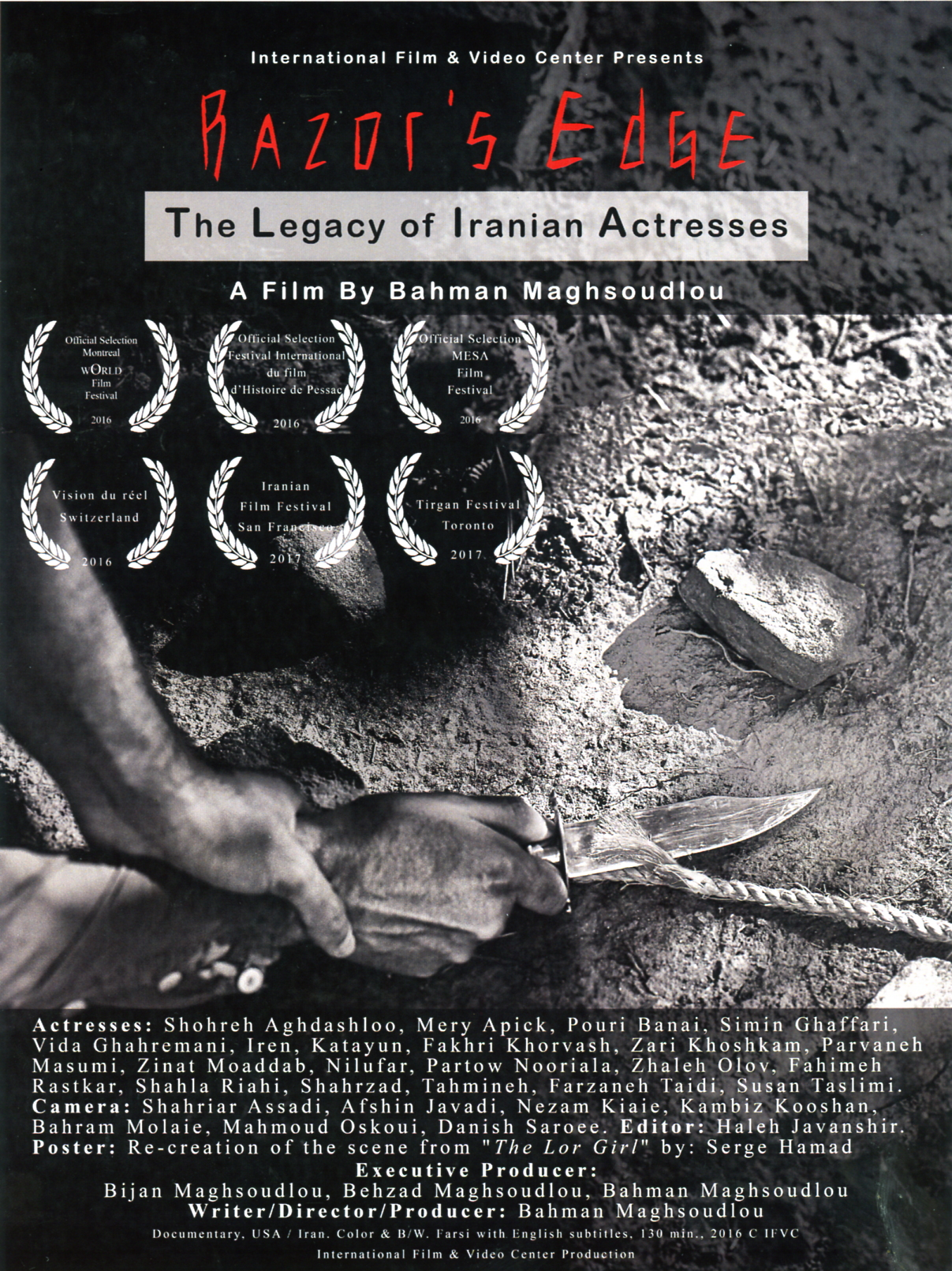
- Directed by: Bahman Maghsoudlou
- Written by: Bahman Maghsoudlou
- Produced by: Bahman Maghsoudlou
- Starring: Shohreh Aghdashloo, Mary Apick, Pouri Banayi, Bahram Beyzai, Vida Ghahremani, Farzaneh Taidi, Susan Taslimi
- Production companies: IFVC (International Film & Video Center)
- Distributed by: IFVC
- Release date: 2016
- Running time: 130 min.
- Country: Iran
- Language: Persian

Razor's Edge: The Legacy of Iranian Actresses is a 2016 documentary written and directed by Bahman Maghsoudlou. The film examines the Iranian film industry, starting in the 1930s and through the Iranian Revolution of 1979. The film features extensive interviews many with the actresses themselves, and clips from films.

== Background ==
The film focuses on the dual issues of the general attitude towards women (particularly women in the arts) in Iranian society and problems with censorship, the latter often arising from the former. The actresses and their male counterparts were so thoroughly blackballed by the Islamic government that it was even forbidden for the media to mention their names in print.

This film is the second in Maghsoudlou's series on Iranian cinema and the seventh in his series on important Iranian cultural figures.

The film is particularly notable for the number of actresses from the period in question who agreed to be interviewed for it, as well as the rare film clips that Maghsoudlou assembled to give non-Iranians the chance to glimpse a national cinema that has not been seen in many parts of the world.

== Cast ==
The actresses interviewed are:

- Shoreh Aghdashloo
- Katayun Amir Ebrahimi
- Mary Apick
- Pouri Banayi
- Simin Ghaffari
- Vida Ghahremani
- Zahra Hatami
- Iren
- Fakhri Khorvash
- Parvaneh Massoumi
- Fahimeh Rastkar
- Shahla Riahi
- Shahrzad
- Tahmine
- Farzaneh Taidi
- Susan Taslimi

The clips featured come from the following films:

- Lor Girl (1933, D: Ardeshir Irani)
- A Girl from Shiraz (1954, D: Samuel Khachikian)
- Marjan (film) (1956, D: Shahla Riahi)
- Farewell to Tehran (1966, D: Samuel Khachikian)
- Hengameh (1968, D: Samuel Khachikian)
- Hassan, the Bald (1970, D: Ali Hatami)
- The Carriage Driver (1971, D: Nosratallah Karimi)
- Dash Akol (1971, D: Masoud Kimiai)
- The Interim Husband (1971, D: Nosratallah Karimi)
- Downpour (film) (1972, D: Bahram Bayzai)
- The Suitor (1972, D: Ali Hatami)
- Topoli (1972, D: Reza Mirlohi)
- Tranquility in the Presence of Others (1972, D: Nasser Taghvai)
- The Mongols (1973, D: Parviz Kimiavi)
- The Soil (film) (1973, D: Masoud Kimiai)
- Strait (1973, D: Amir Naderi)
- Prince Ehtejab (1974, D: Bahman Farmanara)
- Secrets of the Treasure of the Jinn Valley (a.k.a. The Ghost Valley's Treasure Mysteries) (1974, D: Ebrahim Golestan)
- Stranger and the Fog (1976, D: Bahram Bayzai)
- Back and Dagger (1977, D: Iraj Ghaderi)
- Ballad of Tara (1979, D: Bahram Bayzai)
- Mayram and Mani (1979, D: Shahrzad)
- Death of Yazdgerd (film) (1982, D: Bahram Bayzai)
- Bashu, the Little Stranger (1989, D: Bahram Bayzai)

== See also ==
- Abbas Kiarostami: A Report
