= Bahman Maghsoudlou =

Iranian film scholar/critic/producer/director (born 1946)

- بهمن مقصودلو
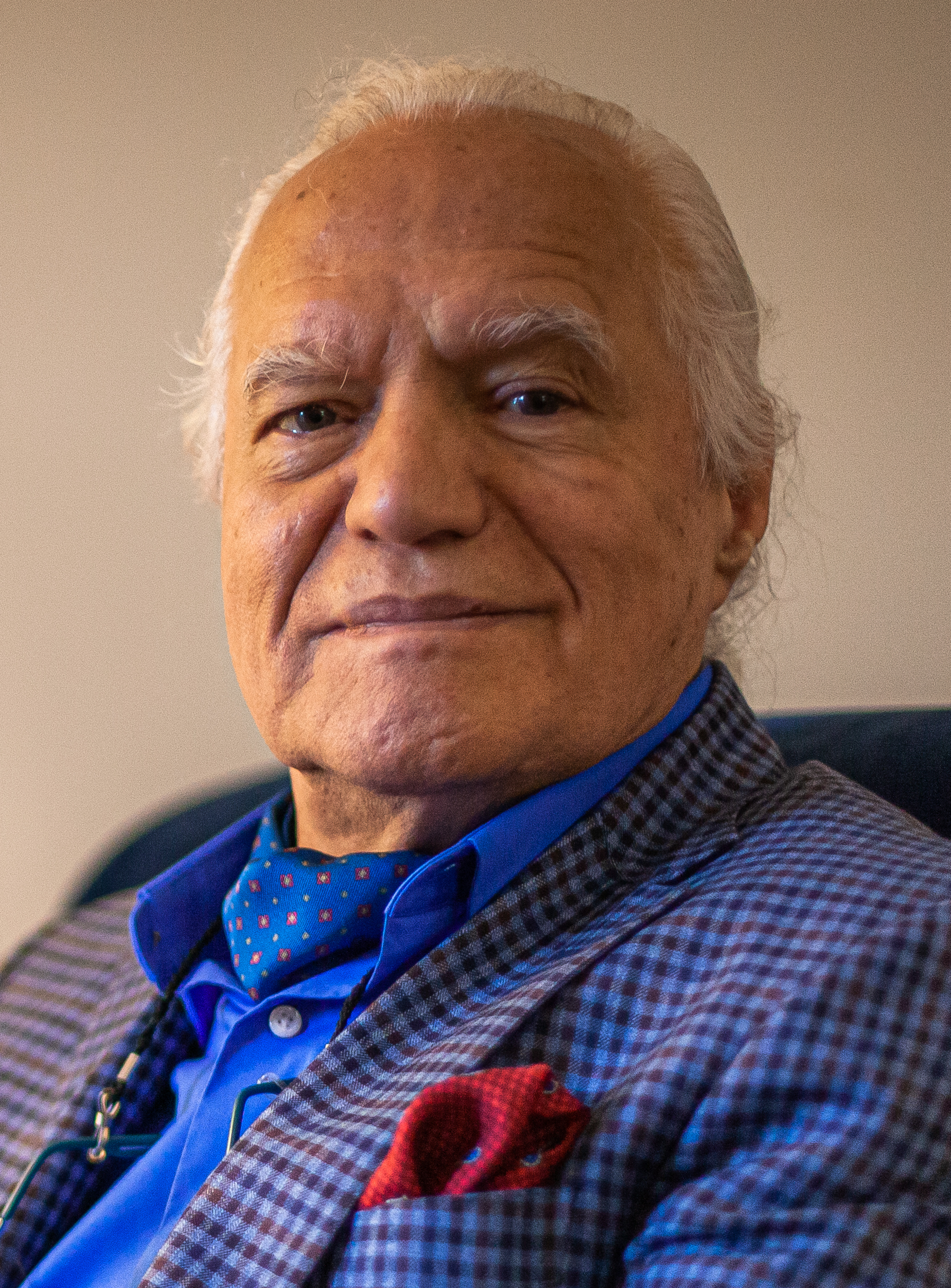
- Maghsoudlou in 2019
- Born: 1946 (age 79–80); Gorgan, Iran
- Education: Columbia University
- Occupations: Filmmaker; author; producer
- Years active: 1968–present

Bahman Maghsoudlou (born 1946) is an Iranian film scholar, critic, author and independent film producer/director. Maghsoudlou has, in the words of Cinema Without Borders editor-in-chief Bijan Tehrani, "dedicated his life [to] recording valuable information about Iran’s contemporary art and culture."

A graduate in cinema studies from the College of Staten Island with a PhD from Columbia University, Maghsoudlou lives in New Jersey.

== Film ==
Maghsoudlou's first film was a short documentary that he wrote, directed and produced on artist Ardeshir Mohasses called Ardeshir Mohasses & His Caricatures in 1972. This would turn out to be the first in a series of films on Iran's most important artistic figures, the Renowned Iranian Artists series, although the follow-ups would not be produced for many years afterwards. In 1998, he had Ahmad Shamlou: Master Poet of Liberty which was subsequently followed by Ahmad Mahmoud: A Noble Novelist in 2004 and Iran Darroudi: The Painter of Ethereal Moments in 2009. Maghsoudlou served as director for the latter two of these films, as he has for all but one of the films in the series.

A 2013 addition to the series was an update to his earlier film on Mohasses, entitled Ardeshir Mohasses: The Rebellious Artist. Maghsoudlou had long wished to update his earlier film on his friend and the inspiration came after two occurrences in 2008: a long overdue retrospective of Mohasses's work at the Asia Society in New York City and the artist's untimely passing. The new film features interviews with prominent critics and friends from around the world and emphasizes the eternal truth in Mohasses's struggles with censorship. The film had its world premiere in April 2013 at the Palm Beach International Film Festival.

The next addition to the series was 2013's Abbas Kiarostami: A Report, a look at the work of acclaimed Iranian filmmaker Abbas Kiarostami, examining the themes and techniques that have run through his body of work, with a particular focus on his debut feature, The Report. The film premised at the Montreal World Film Festival. It was also featured at the 2016 Festival International du Film d'Histoire in Pessac, France, in a special section dedicated to Kiarostami. This was Maghsoudlou's first feature-length documentary. As well as being an entry in the Renowned Iranian Artists series, it is also the first installment in another series, Iranian Cinema: Searching for the Roots. This new series, as planned, will have ten parts.

Maghsoudlou's next feature documentary, released in 2016, was called Razor's Edge: The Legacy of Iranian Actresses. Like the Kiarostami film, this film served as the next entry in both the Iranian Cinema and the Renowned Iranian Artists series. Through copious interviews with the most prominent actresses of the pre-Revolutionary period (including Pouri Banayi, Susan Taslimi, Irene Zazians (a.k.a. Iren) and Shohreh Aghdashloo) and an abundance of rare clips from their films, the documentary examines the role of women in Iranian cinema from both cultural and artistic standpoints. In an article in Asharq Al-Awsat, journalist Amir Taheri wrote that the film "contains several exciting surprises," also noting that the interviews with the actresses "[shed] light on a chunk of Iran's contemporary history" and "[remind] us that it was always difficult to be a woman in Iran even under the Shah, and that being a film actress was even more of a gamble."

The next film, the third to represent both series, focused on filmmaker, critic and playwright Bahram Beyzai, and was called Bahram Beyzaie: A Mosaic of Metaphors. Bijan Tehrani, writing for Cinema Without Borders, called it a "must-see" and "a beautiful and lasting artwork."

The next film in the Renowned Iranian Artists series was 2020's Najaf Daryabandari: A Window on the World, a short film about the prominent Iranian writer and translator who brought works by, among others, Hemingway, Faulkner and Twain to an Iranian audience.

This was followed by the fourth film to represent both the Renowned Iranian Artists and Iranian Cinema: Searching for the Roots series, Dariush Mehrjui: Making The Cow, a look at the production of Mehrjui's seminal film Gav (The Cow (1969 film)). Cinema Without Borders called the documentary "well-made, informative and at the same time entertaining".

As a producer, Mr. Maghsoudlou's films have been to more than 100 film festivals worldwide. These films include:

The Suitors, selected for the Cannes in 1988; Manhattan by Numbers (by Amir Naderi), selected for Venice and Toronto 1993; Seven Servants by ‘Daryush Shokof’’, selected for Berlin, Toronto and Locarno 1996, and Silence of the Sea, chosen for the Mannheim Film Festival 2003.

Along with Iranian Cinema: Searching for the Roots, Maghsoudlou is also working on another long-term documentary project, The Life and Legacy of Mohammad Mossadegh.

Having organized the first-ever Iranian Film Festival in New York in 1980, he organized the International Short Film Festival: Independent Films on Iran, held in October 2007, at the Asia Society in New York.

Maghsoudlou has served as a jury member for several prestigious international film festivals. He had the honor of being the lone non-Spanish member of the jury for the 3rd Edition of the Ibn Arabi International Film Festival (IBAFF) (held March 5 through 10th in Murcia, Spain), serving alongside a group of notables of the Spanish film scene, including Alberto Elena. And most recently he served as president of the jury for the Zeniths for the Best First Fiction Feature Films section of the 2014 Montreal World Film Festival.

== Books ==
Maghsoudlou is the recipient of Iran's Forough Farrokhzad literary award for writing and editing a series of books about cinema and theater (1975), including Iranian Cinema (1987, New York University's Center for Middle Eastern Studies). He has presented this award at the fourth Forough Farrokhzad awards ceremony, held at the Central Palace for Young Adults in February 1975.

In 2009, Maghsoudlou published Grass: Untold Stories, a book detailing the lives and adventures of three unique Americans, Merian C. Cooper, Ernest Schoedsack (the creators of King Kong, among other films) and Marguerite Harrison, a journalist for the Baltimore Sun. The book's initial narrative details what the three individuals did during and after World War I, including Cooper and Harrison's stints as prisoners in Russia, and then describes their joint 1924 trip to Iran, where they had vowed to follow one of the nation's nomadic tribes on their annual migration, eventually settling on the Bakhtiari. The trip was filmed and the footage turned into one of the first documentary films, Grass. Maghsoudlou's book was published by Mazda Press and featured a foreword by renowned film historian Kevin Brownlow.

In 2020, Maghsoudlou released When the Moon Was Not Behind the Clouds (IFVC Books), a collection of interviews with an assortment of Iranian women from across many artistic disciplines (painting, sculpture, literature, film, theater, ballet), including Iran Darroudi, Mansooreh Hosseini, Simin Behbahani, Mina Assadi, Shahla Riahi, Mahin Oskouei, Fakhri Khorvash and Khatereh Parvaneh.

2021 saw the publication of The Poetic Realism of Jean Renoir (Hekmat Kalameh, Tehran), a book on the life of the famed filmmaker that also includes analyses of his work.

Dr. Maghsoudlou recently published Charmed by the Silver Screen: The World Cinema (Tehran, Damon, 2023), and his latest book is A Tribute to Bahman Maghsoudlou’s cinematic Legacy.

Maghsoudlou became a member of the prestigious list of PEN American Center in 2011.

== Filmography ==
Film
Year	Title	Role	Notes
1972	Ardeshir Mohasses & His Caricatures	Producer, director, writer	
1988	The Suitors	Actor	
1990	Angels are Wired	Producer	
1993	Manhattan by Numbers	Executive producer	
1996	Seven Servants	Producer	
1999	Zendegi dar meh (Life in Fog)	Executive producer	
1999	Ahmad Shamlou: Master Poet of Liberty	Producer	
2000	Surviving Paradise	Producer	
2001	Ta'zieh: Another Narration	Executive producer	
2004	Silence of the Sea	Producer	
2004	Ahmad Mahmoud: A Noble Novelist	Producer, director, writer	
2007	Asudem	Associate producer	
2009	Iran Darroudi: The Painter of Ethereal Moments	Producer, director, camera	
2011	Golchehreh	Executive producer	
2013	Ardeshir Mohasses: The Rebellious Artist	Producer, director, writer, camera	
2013	Abbas Kiarostami: A Report	Producer, director, writer, camera	
2016	Razor's Edge: The Legacy of Iranian Actresses	Producer, director, camera	
2019	Bahram Beyzaie: A Mosaic of Metaphors	Producer, director, camera	
2020	Najaf Daryabandari: A Window on the World	Producer, director, writer	
2022	Dariush Mehrjui: Making The Cow	Producer, director, writer	
