= Abbas Kiarostami: A Report =

Iranian documentary

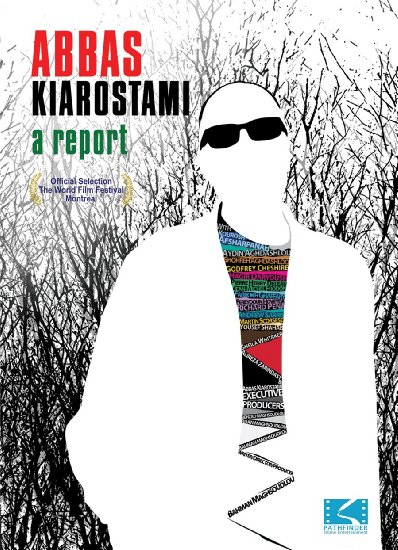
- Directed by: Bahman Maghsoudlou
- Produced by: Bahman Maghsoudlou
- Starring: Abbas Kiarostami
- Release date: 2003
- Country: Iran

Abbas Kiarostami: A Report is a 2013 documentary film about the Iranian filmmaker Abbas Kiarostami, produced and directed by Bahman Maghsoudlou. Out of the documentaries Maghsoudlou has made, this is the first of feature length.

The film looks at Kiarostami's career, finding themes and stylistics that have reoccurred throughout his canon, from his early shorts to his later international successes, with a special focus on his first feature, 1977's The Report. The film features interviews with a number of people who worked on the film, including Academy Award-nominated actress Shohreh Aghdashloo, and commentary by, among others, Godfrey Cheshire, Richard Peña, and the late Andrew Sarris, with whom Maghsoudlou studied and to whom the film is dedicated.

The film is both the latest in a series of films produced and (mostly) directed by Maghsoudlou, the Great Iranian Artists series, and the first installment in a new series, Iranian Cinema: Searching for the Roots. It had its world premiere at the Montreal World Film Festival.

== See also ==
- Razor's Edge: The Legacy of Iranian Actresses
- Bahram Beizai: A Mosaic of Metaphors
