= Haidar Khan =

Iranian leader

- Born: Unknown; Iran
- Died: c. 1925; Iran

Haidar Khan (died c. 1925?) was the leader of one of the Bakhtiari tribes in Iran in 1924 and a main character in the documentary Grass.

Haidar Khan's then nine-year-old son, Lufta, was interviewed by author Bahman Maghsoudlou in 1990 and authenticated the events depicted in the movie shot in 1924.

According to Lufta, Haidar Khan contracted yellow fever the following year and died as a result.
