= Bijan Tehrani =

Bijan Tehrani may refer to:

- Bijan Tehrani (director) (born 1944), Iranian director
- Bijan Tehrani (entrepreneur), Australian entrepreneur
