= Terry Ramsaye =

American journalist & film producer (1885-1954)

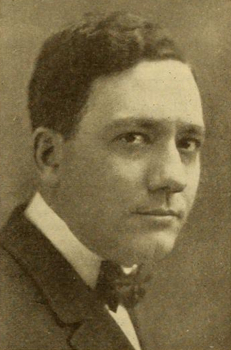
- 1916 photo from Moving Picture World
- Born: November 1, 1885; Tonganoxie, Kansas, USA
- Died: August 19, 1954 (aged 68); Norwalk, Connecticut, USA
- Occupations: Journalist & film producer

Terry Ramsaye (November 2, 1885, Tonganoxie, Kansas – August 19, 1954, Norwalk, Connecticut) was a journalist, film producer and film historian, the author of A Million and One Nights: A History of the Motion Picture [Through 1925] (New York: Simon & Schuster, 1926).

== Biography ==
Ramsaye started his professional career as an engineer, but switched to journalism when he joined the staff of the Kansas City Star and Times in 1905. In the following decade, he worked on newspapers in Leavenworth, Kansas, and in Omaha, St. Paul, Minnesota, and Chicago.

The motion picture industry was in its infancy when he joined Mutual Film Corporation in 1915. Perhaps Ramsaye's most enduring achievement as a producer was the famous series of 12 Charlie Chaplin comedies of 1916 and 1917; these Chaplin shorts, such as Easy Street and The Pawnshop, have never gone out of circulation since they were produced, and have been revived in theaters, on television, as home movies, and on home video. Film archivist David Shepard wrote, "Terry Ramsaye, who produced them for Mutual and who ought to know, estimated in 1925 that 'the earning power of Chaplin pictures is apparently limited only by the physical life of the negatives.'" Shepard added, "Exhibitors who gave $50 a day to show the Mutual Chaplins when they were new, paid four times that price for the same pictures six or seven years later."

Ramsaye founded Screen Telegram, which achieved conspicuous success during World War I. He was one of the founding members of the Associated Motion Picture Advertisers.

Subsequently he was associated with Samuel Roxy Rothafel in the management of Broadway's Rialto and Rivoli theaters. He also launched and edited the newsreel Kinograms. After producing and editing numerous adventure films including Grass (1925) and Simba: King of the Beasts (1928) with explorers Martin and Osa Johnson, he became editor-in-chief of Pathé News and Audio Review.

In 1920, Photoplay commissioned Ramsaye to write a history of the motion picture that was serialized in the magazine from April 1921 until March 1925 as The Romantic History of the Motion Picture (and excerpts appearing in the Film Daily Yearbook), which was later published in book-form as A Million and One Nights: A History of the Motion Picture Through 1925. As one of the first extensive overviews of the development of the movie industry, it was highly influential on cinema historiography (at least in the United States) and remained in print until late in the 20th century. Thomas Edison's endorsement is included in the book. and H. L. Mencken spoke highly of it.

In 1931, Ramsaye joined the Quigley Publishing Company as editor of the Motion Picture Herald, a post he held until 1941. Subsequently, he lectured on motion pictures and contributed articles to various encyclopedias and year books. He continued his association with Quigley as consulting editor and author of a weekly column for the Herald until his death in 1954.

== Bibliography ==
- Ramsaye, Terry (2012) [1926]. A Million and One Nights: A History of the Motion Picture. Abingdon, UK: Frank Cass. ISBN 9781136247446.
