= Simba: King of the Beasts =

1928 film

Simba: The King of the Beasts
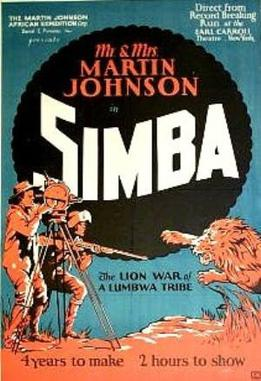
- Theatrical poster for the film
- Directed by: Martin & Osa Johnson
- Written by: Martin Johnson; Terry Ramsaye
- Produced by: Daniel E. Pomeroy; Carl Akeley; Alfred J. Klein
- Starring: Martin & Osa Johnson
- Cinematography: Martin & Osa Johnson
- Edited by: Martin Johnson; Terry Ramsaye
- Music by: Marvin Faulwell; Bob Keckeisen
- Production company: Martin Johnson African Expedition Corporation
- Release date: January 23, 1928
- Running time: 87 minutes
- Country: United States
- Languages: Sound (Synchronized); English Intertitles

Simba: The King of the Beasts is a 1928 American black-and-white sound documentary film, directed by Martin and Osa Johnson, which features the couple's four-year expedition to track the lion across Kenyan veld to his lair. While the film has no audible dialog, it was released with a synchronized musical score with sound effects using both the sound-on-disc and sound-on-film process. The film, which went on nationwide general release on January 25, 1928, was premiered at the Earl Carroll Theatre in New York on January 23, 1928. The film entered the public domain on January 1, 2024.

== Music ==
The film featured a theme song entitled “Song of Safari” by Sam Stept (words and music). Frank Munn sang the theme song on the film's soundtrack. Frank Munn also recorded the song for Brunswick Records.

== Production ==
Footage for the film was shot from 1924 to 1927, during the couple's second and longest trip to Africa, when they spent much of their time in northern Kenya by a lake they dubbed Paradise, at Mount Marsabit. The film Martin's Safari (1928) was also made with footage of this trip and some was reused in later productions Congorilla (1932) and Osa's Four Years in Paradise (1941).

== Reviews ==
Allmovie reviewer Hal Erickson writes that, despite being made, "under the auspices of the American Museum of Natural History," and purporting, "to be an authentic filmed record of the Johnsons' most recent foray into Africa," the "expedition" documentary, "seldom lets facts get in the way of a good story." For example, "The film's highlight shows the intrepid Mrs. Osa Johnson bringing down a charging rhinoceros with one well-aimed shot. But the reusage of Simba footage in the Johnsons' 1932 documentary Congorilla reveals that the rhino was merely scared away by the gunfire — a classic example of how the truth can be 'adjusted with the help of a clever editor.'"

The "groundbreaking travelogue," was, according to WildFilmHistory, "Filmed in an era when African wildlife was still relatively bountiful, the production shows how the landscape looked in the early twentieth century." "Evading stampeding elephants, employing scores of servants and gamefully shooting down a variety of species," "with the production including provoked behaviour, staged confrontations and animals shot to death on film. Relying heavily on cutting in kills from professional marksmen, numerous hunting scenes culminate in a heart stopping sequence where, with the use of clever editing, the adventurous Mrs Johnson appears to bring down a charging rhinoceros with one well-aimed shot," and "the film provides an intriguing glimpse not only into 1920s Africa but also into the Johnsons themselves, part of a 'gung-ho' breed that is, in itself, now largely extinct." "Responsible for introducing a whole generation of American movie-goers to the wonders of the African environment, Simba was a large-scale success, detailing wildlife and indigenous tribespeople that had seldom appeared on screen before."
