= Western Air Express Flight 7 =

1937 aviation accident in Newhall, California

Coordinates: 34.354°N 118.459°W

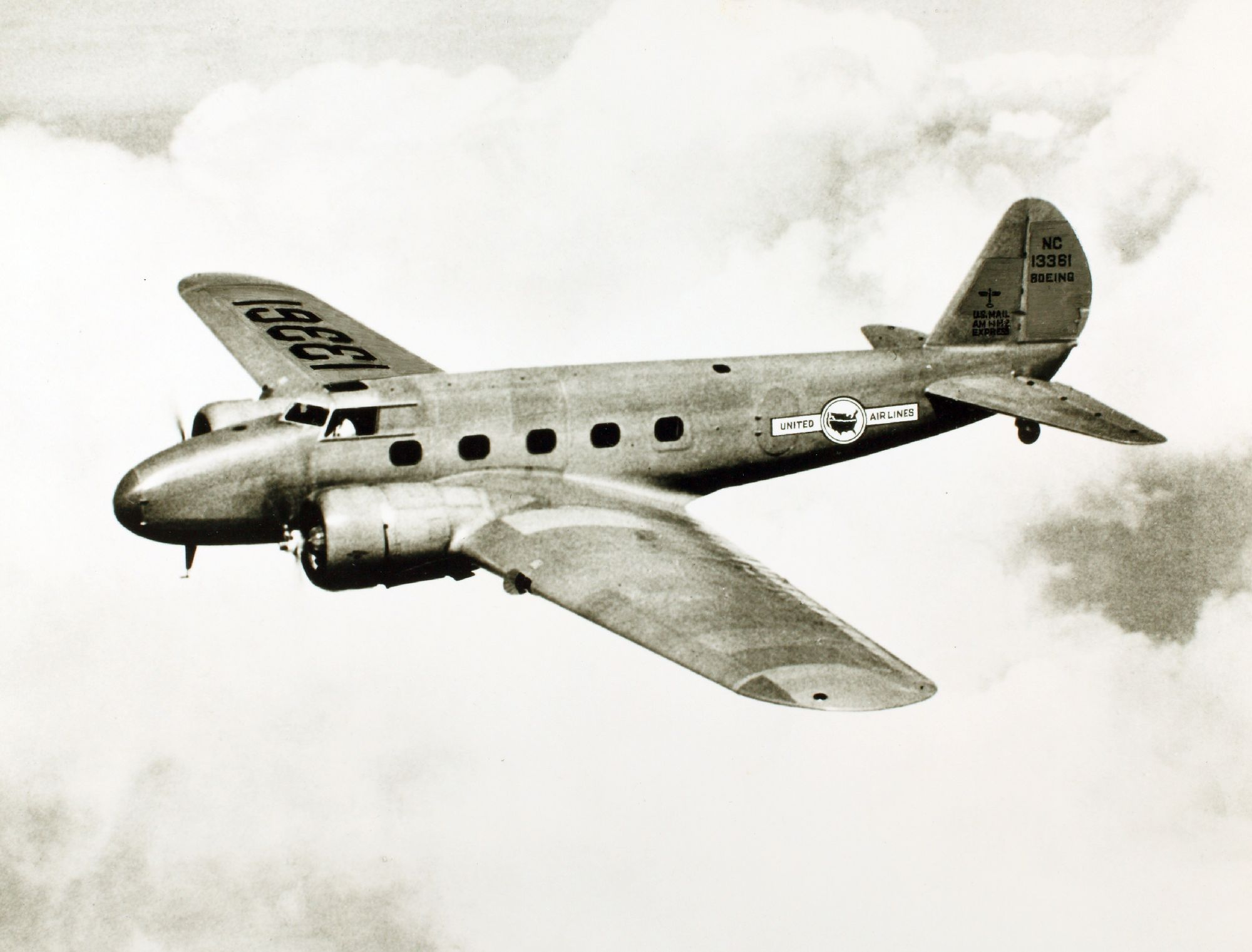
- A Boeing 247 similar to the aircraft involved

Accident
- Date: January 12, 1937
- Summary: Controlled flight into terrain
- Site: Los Pinetos Peak, near Saugus and Newhall, California

Aircraft
- Aircraft type: Boeing 247D
- Operator: Western Air Express
- Registration: NC13315
- Flight origin: Salt Lake City, Utah
- Destination: Burbank, California
- Occupants: 13
- Passengers: 10
- Crew: 3
- Fatalities: 5
- Survivors: 8

Western Air Express Flight 7, a domestic scheduled passenger flight from Salt Lake City to Burbank, California, crashed on January 12, 1937, near Newhall, California. The twin engine Boeing 247D, registration NC13315, crashed shortly after 11:00 a.m. in adverse weather conditions. Of the three crew and ten passengers on board, one crew member and four passengers perished. One of the fatalities was noted international adventurer and filmmaker Martin Johnson, of Martin and Osa Johnson fame.

The off-course Boeing 247D, en route from Salt Lake City, was on approach to the Union Air Terminal at Burbank, California in severely lowered visibility due to heavy rain and fog. On suddenly spotting a ridge looming directly ahead, pilot William L. Lewis cut power to the engines and "pancaked" onto the hillside to reduce the force of the impact.

The airliner first struck the ground with the left wing tip. It then skidded along the side of the mountain in a curved path for approximately 125 feet, finally coming to rest headed in the opposite direction from which it struck. The point of collision was at an elevation of 3,550 feet, near the summit of Los Pinetos, the highest mountain in the immediate vicinity.

One passenger died immediately and three more died within a week, as did the co-pilot, C. T. Owens. Martin Johnson died of a fractured skull while hospitalized. His wife Osa suffered back and neck injuries but continued with the couple’s lecture circuit, doing so from her wheelchair. She later sued Western Air Express and United Airports Co of California for $502,539, but lost on appeal in 1941. The California Supreme Court chose not to hear her appeal.

One of the survivors was a 25-year-old passenger who managed to hike five miles down the mountainside where he met rescuers from the Olive View Sanitarium who were searching for the accident site.

The accident was investigated by the Accident Board of the Bureau of Air Commerce, under the authority of the Department of Commerce. The cause was attributed to the adverse weather conditions, coupled with the pilot’s decision to descend to a dangerously low altitude without positive knowledge of his position.

== See also ==
- 1937 in aviation
- 1937 in the United States
- Aviation accidents and incidents
- List of accidents and incidents involving commercial aircraft
