= Iran Darroudi =

Iranian female artist (1936–2021)

- ایران درودی
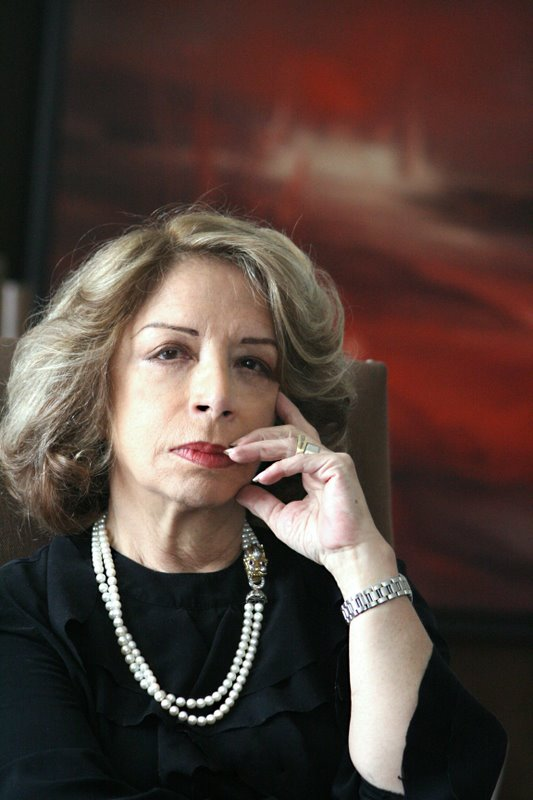
- Darroudi in 2006
- Born: 2 September 1936; Mashhad, Iran
- Died: 29 October 2021 (aged 85); Tehran, Iran
- Other names: Iran Droudy
- Education: École Nationale Supérieure des Beaux-Arts; École du Louvre; Royal Academy of Brussels
- Known for: Fine art painter
- Spouse: Parviz Moghadasi (m. 1966; died 1985)
- Website: http://www.irandarroudi.com/

Iran Darroudi (Persian: ایران درودی; 2 September 1936 – 29 October 2021) was a prominent Iranian modern artist. Her work is characterized by surreal paintings that incorporate Iranian-themed imagery and striking lighting effects. Over the years, Darroudi divided her time between Tehran and Paris, where she developed her distinctive artistic style. Her contributions to modern art have left a lasting impact on Iranian art scene.

== Early life ==
Iran Darroudi was born in Mashhad, Iran, into a family with a rich cultural heritage. Her father's side comprised traders from Khorasan, while her mother's family were merchants from the Caucasus who had settled in Mashhad. In 1937, her family relocated to Hamburg, Germany, for her father's business. However, with the onset of World War II in the early 1940s, they were compelled to leave Germany, and by 1945, they had returned to Mashhad.

Darroudi pursued an extensive education in the arts, studying at the École Nationale Supérieure des Beaux-Arts and the École du Louvre in Paris, France, where she focused on the history of art. She also studied stained glass at the Royal Academy of Fine Arts in Belgium and television direction and production at the RCA Institute in New York City. This diverse educational background contributed to her unique artistic vision and multidisciplinary approach to modern art.

== Career ==
Iran Darroudi's paintings are defined as Surrealist works, combining the delicacy and romantic spirit of Persian paintings with the elements of Surrealism. Her first solo exhibition took place in Miami, Florida, in 1958, at the invitation of the Florida State Art Center.

In addition to her painting career, Darroudi wrote articles on the history of art and art criticism for the conservative Iranian newspaper, Kayhan. In 1968, she created a 55-minute documentary about the Venice Biennial and was appointed an honorary professor at the Industrial University of Tehran, where she taught art history. The following year, the ITT Corporation commissioned her to paint Iranian Oil. She held exhibitions in Paris, at the Atrium Artist Gallery in Geneva, and at Galerie 21 in Zürich.

In 1976, Darroudi exhibited at the Mexican Museum of Art, where the Spanish painter Antonio Rodríguez Luna acclaimed her as one of the world's four greatest painters. Two years later, she relocated to France, subsequently living between Paris and Tehran.

In 2009, a documentary titled Iran Darroudi: The Painter of Ethereal Moments, produced by Bahman Maghsoudlou, focused on her life and art, further cementing her legacy as a significant figure in the world of modern art.

== Personal life and death ==
In 1966, Iran Darroudi met and married Parviz Moghadasi in New York City, where he was studying television direction. The couple subsequently returned to Iran and worked for six years at the newly established Iranian television organization as a producer and director team.

Her husband, Parviz Moghadasi died in 1985. Iran Darroudi continued her artistic endeavors and lived between Paris and Tehran. On 29 October 2021, at the age of 85, she died in Tehran due to cardiac arrest after a three-month battle with COVID-19.

== Works ==
=== Select solo exhibitions ===
- 1958 - Florida State University, Miami, Florida
- 1960 - Farhang Hall, Tehran, Iran

== Bibliography ==
- Darroudi, Iran (1973). Iran Darroudi: Oeuvres/Works 1959-1973. Tehran, Iran: Offset Press Inc. ASIN B0007AHRWM.
- Darroudi, Iran (1996). Distance between two points (in Persian) (1 ed.). Nashr-e Ney.
- Darroudi, Iran (2000). Distance Between Two Points (in Persian) (5 ed.). Tehran, Iran: Nashr-e Ney Publisher. ISBN 964312231X.
