= Ardeshir Mohasses & His Caricatures =

- اردشیر محصص و صورتک هایش
- Directed by: Bahman Maghsoudlou
- Written by: Bahman Maghsoudlou
- Produced by: Bahman Maghsoudlou
- Starring: Ardeshir Mohasses
- Release date: 1972
- Running time: 20 minutes
- Country: Pahlavi Iran
- Language: Persian

Ardeshir Mohasses & His Caricatures (Persian: اردشیر محصص و صورتک هایش, romanized: Ardeshir Mohasses va suratak hấyaš) is a short film written, produced and directed by Bahman Maghsoudlou in 1972. It was the first film ever made about Ardeshir Mohasses, the acclaimed caricaturist from Iran, and remained the only film about him until 2012 when Maghsoudlou made a sequel/update entitled Ardeshir Mohasses: The Rebellious Artist. Maghsoudlou shot the film by visiting his friend with a camera and merely filming the artist's activities for a few hours one afternoon. The film was made as an episode of an arts-themed program Maghsoudlou was producing for Iranian television, which is also where it had its debut soon after filming.

Twenty-four years later in 1996, it was selected to be shown at the Dok Leipzig. It was also shown as part of a retrospective on Mohasses at the Asia Society in New York City in June 2008 entitled 'Ardeshir Mohasses: Art and Satire in Iran,' an event that featured appearances by, among others, Iranian artist Shirin Neshat and former Attorney General Ramsey Clark, both friends of Mohasses's. It was the enthusiastic reception of this retrospective and the artist's passing soon afterward that spurred Maghsoudlou to create the updated film.
