= Kamshad Kooshan =

American film director

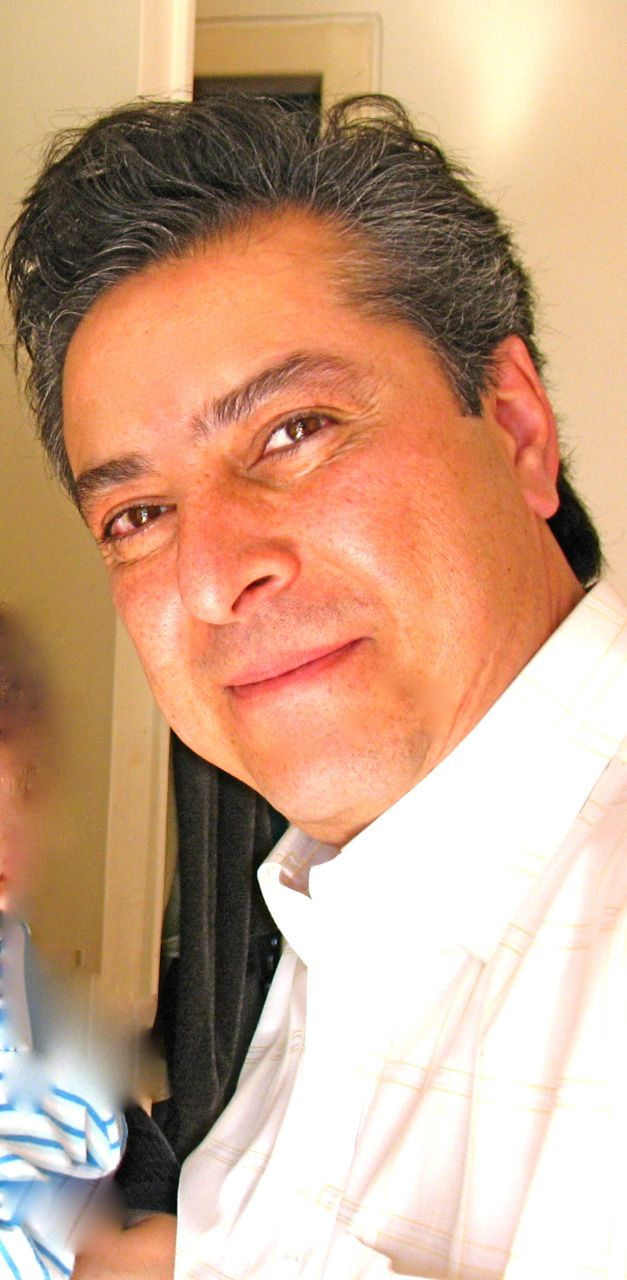
- Kamshad Kooshan
- Born: December 19, 1962 (age 63); Tehran, Imperial State of Iran
- Education: San Francisco State University
- Occupations: Film director, actor, screenwriter, film producer, educator
- Years active: 1984–present

Kamshad Kooshan (Persian: كامشاد كوشان; born 1962) is an Iranian-born American actor, film director, screenwriter, film producer, and educator.

In 2000, his debut feature film, Surviving Paradise, was released to a three-month theatrical run in U.S. cinemas, introducing Shohreh Aghdashloo to Hollywood and becoming the first English-language Iranian feature film by an Iranian-American filmmaker to be distributed in North America.

== Early life and education ==
Kooshan was born on December 19, 1962, in Tehran, to a middle-class family. His father Abbas Kooshan was an official in the Ministry of Treasury, and his uncle was film producer Esmail Kooshan, director of Pars Film Studios. While he was around two years old, his father died, leaving his mother Noori Khanoom to raise her five sons by herself. Thereafter, he began a hobby of photography when he was around 12 years old. In 1979, during the Iranian Revolution, he moved to the United States.

In the United States, Kooshan attended Skyline High School in Oakland, California. He went on to study mechanical engineering at Holy Names University and Chico State University, but after three years he took a three-year break from university to work. In 1986 he returned to San Francisco State University to study a bachelor's degree in computer science.

== Early career in the United States ==
In 1990 he began working at Sybase Inc., and also resumed his interest in photography. In the next few years, he began writing short stories and novels, and also translated short stories from other languages into Persian, including works by Italo Calvino and Jorge Luis Borges.

He quit his job at Sybase Inc. and remained at the academy for three years.

== Film career ==
In 1991 he returned to Iran to visit his family. On his return to the United States, he began to combine his interest in short stories and photography into filmmaking. He started attending the Film Arts Foundation, an independent film organization in San Francisco. As part of his studies he made several short films.

In 1995, Kooshan founded the International Tournée of Iranian Short Films in Diaspora. His film The Last Illusion (1994) was part of the touring International Tournée film festival.

Kooshan was a founding member of Golden Thread Productions, theatre company in 1996 in San Francisco.

Following this tour in 1996, he received an offer from the Academy of Art University in San Francisco to teach screenplay writing and "Aesthetic & Style" at the Graduate Film Department.

While at the academy, Kooshan began writing the screenplay for Surviving Paradise, which was subsequently selected as one of 50 screenplays from more than 2,000 submitted to the Sundance Screenwriters Lab. This film was released in 2000 as his feature film debut, starring the Oscar-nominated Iranian actor, Shohreh Aghdashloo. Production of the film took three years; it was filmed in Los Angeles and edited in San Francisco, with a co-production deal with Italian sound designer and producer, Fillipo Bussi. After screening at various international film festivals, including the Cairo International Film Festival and Delhi Film Festival, Surviving Paradise premiered in Los Angeles and was in theaters for three months. It was the first English-language Iranian film to be distributed in the United States.

== Filmography ==
Filmography of Kooshan
Year	Title	Role	Notes
1993	In Search of Reality		
1994	The Last Illusion	writer, director	
1995	The Ring	writer, director	
1999	Butterfly	director	
2000	Surviving Paradise	writer, director, co-producer	
2002–2005	No Comment	writer, director	
2004	Deborah & I	actor	directed by Zia Dori
2011	Hame-dana	actor	directed by Dariush Mehrjui
2012	Narenji Poush	actor	directed by Dariush Mehrjui
2012	Falling Leaves	actor	directed by Ali Jaberansari.
2017	My Brother Khosrow (Persian: برادرم خسرو, romanized: Baradram Khosro)	actor	

== Plays ==
- Behind Glass Windows (Poshte Panjereye Shisheyi), co-producer, Adeline Street Theater, 1998 (Berkeley, CA)
- Operation No Penetration! (Dokhool Mamnoo), co-producer, Golden Thread Productions, Next Stage Theater, 1997 (San Francisco, CA)
- Waves (Moj), co-director. The full-length play showcased in 1994 at the Exit Theater (San Francisco)
- The Lonely Woman (Zane Tanha), co-director. Full-length play by Dario Fo (San Francisco)

== Photography ==
- Nestle , 2004
- To Foot (a.k.a. Be Paa), Photography Exhibition, Arya Gallery, 2002, Tehran, Iran.

== Publications ==
- San Francisco Stories (a.k.a. Ghesehayeh San Francisco), a collection of short stories in Persian, Ghatreh Publishing, 2016
- Moonlit Garden (a.k.a. Baghe Mahtabi), a collection of short stories in Persian, Raha Publishing, 1999
- Talk of The Town (a.k.a. Goftegoo Dar Shahr), Editor, monthly Persian Arts magazine, Bay Area, 1988–1991
