= Grass (1925 film) =

1925 documentary film

Grass: A Nation's Battle for Life
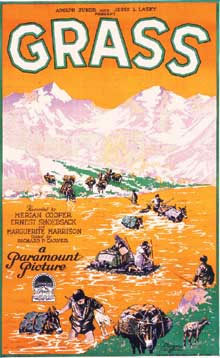
- Theatrical release poster
- Directed by: Merian C. Cooper; Ernest B. Schoedsack
- Written by: Terry Ramsaye
- Produced by: Merian C. Cooper; Ernest B. Schoedsack
- Starring: Merian C. Cooper; Ernest B. Schoedsack; Marguerite Harrison; Haidar Khan
- Edited by: Terry Ramsaye; Richard P. Carver
- Music by: Hugo Riesenfeld
- Distributed by: Paramount Pictures
- Release date: March 20, 1925
- Running time: 72 minutes
- Country: United States
- Languages: Silent film Intertitles

Grass: A Nation's Battle for Life is a 1925 documentary film that follows a branch of the Bakhtiari tribe of Lurs in Persia as they and their herds make their seasonal journey to better pastures. It is considered one of the earliest ethnographic documentary films. In 1997, Grass was selected for preservation in the United States National Film Registry by the Library of Congress as being "culturally, historically, or aesthetically significant."

== Production ==
The film was directed and produced by Merian C. Cooper and Ernest B. Schoedsack, with intertitles by Richard Carver and Terry Ramsaye. It was the first film produced by the team of Cooper and Schoedsack, who went on to produce King Kong and many other films. Cooper was a writer performing research for the American Geographical Society and Schoedsack was a cameraman.

Reporter and former spy Marguerite Harrison was an instrumental member of the production team. Harrison had met Cooper at a ball in Warsaw, and she provided him with food, books and blankets when he was taken prisoner by the Russians in 1920 and sent to work in a prison camp. Harrison also appears in the film as herself. Years later, Schoedsack commented that Harrison had not done "a damn thing" during the expedition.

Funding was provided by a loan of $5,000 from Cooper's father and brother, and Harrison contributed an additional $5,000.

In filming the journey, Cooper, Schoedsack, and Harrison became the first Westerners to make the migration with the Bakhtiari. The only previous ethnographic documentary was Robert Flaherty's Nanook of the North (1922). According to Cooper, the filmmakers were unaware of Nanook until their return to New York City from filming in Persia.

== Summary ==
Grass (1925)

The film's producers were mainly concerned with documenting a way of life that was unknown to all those outside the Bakhtiari realm. The film highlights the extreme hardships faced by nomadic peoples, as well as the bravery and ingenuity of the Bakhtiari on their migration in search of grass, which meant abundant seasonal pasture for their animals.

Grass documents the caravan route from Angora (modern-day Ankara, Turkey) to the Bakhtiari lands in Persia (western Iran in Chaharmahal and Bakhtiari Province and the eastern part of Khuzestan). The film then follows Haidar Khan as he leads 50,000 of his people and countless animals on a harrowing trek across the Karun River and over Zard Kuh, a subrange of the Zagros Mountains.

== Reception ==
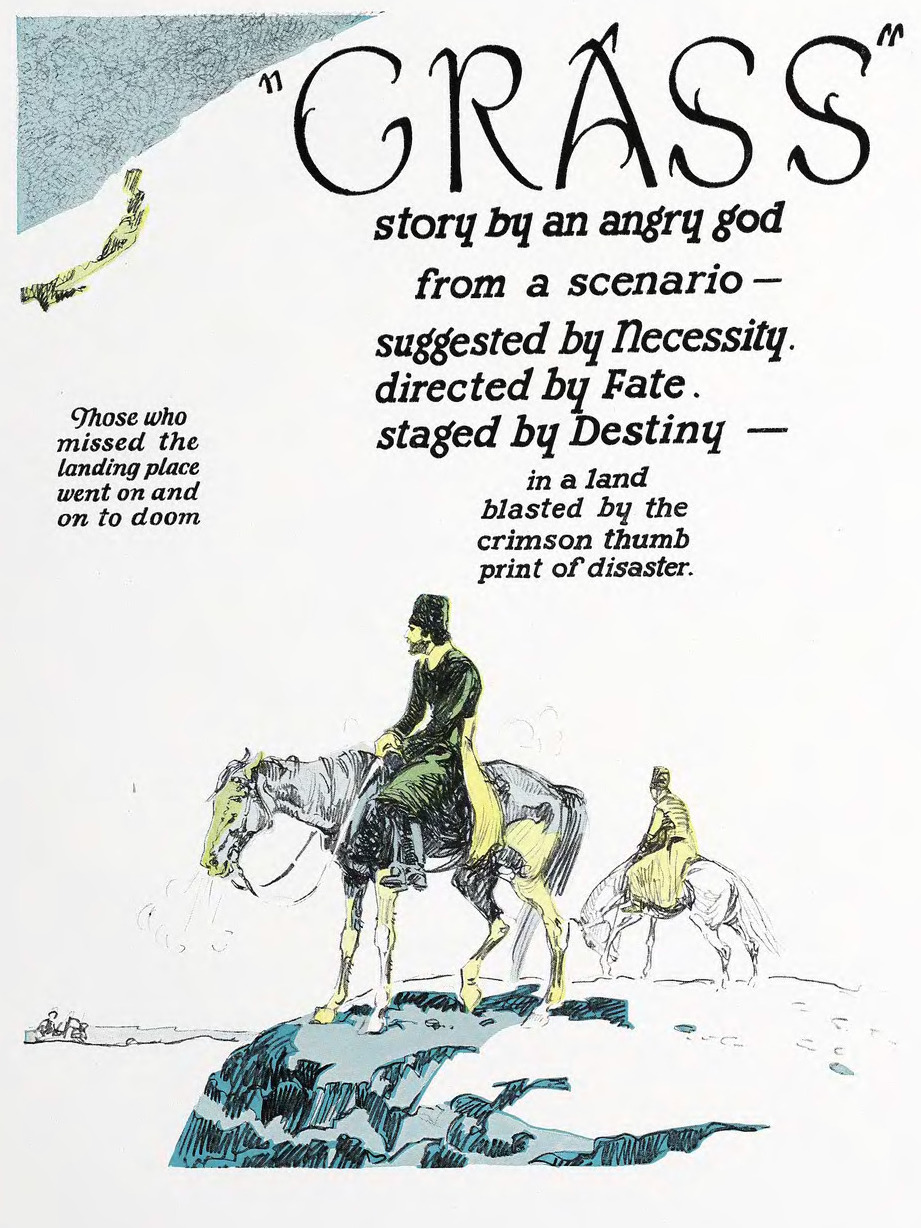
Grass 1925 film advertisement

In a contemporary review for The New York Times, critic Mordaunt Hall wrote: "It is an unusual and remarkable film offering, one that is instructive and compelling but in no way a story. There is drama interspersed with captivating comedy, and the audience last night applauded some of the wonderful photographic sequences and at other times they were moved to laughter by the antics of the animals."

The film was first shown at The Explorers Club annual dinner held at the Hotel McAlpin in New York City on January 24, 1925, along with a lecture by Cooper. The Explorers Journal reported: "It is Mr. Cooper's happy achievement to have portrayed poignantly and comprehensively the drama of a people in their primitive struggle with inexorable forces of nature. The pictures were a fitting climax to an evening of thrilling entertainment."Grass was later purchased for distribution by Paramount Pictures. Its theatrical debut took place at the Criterion Theatre in New York on March 30, 1925.

== Planned remake ==
In 1947, Merian C. Cooper sought to remake Grass, which he called a "damned half picture," and he said: "One man and one woman, and their children, will exemplify for the audience the whole of this struggle for survival which breeds a race that is proud and strong, rugged individuals all, meeting bravely the moods of natural forces seemingly bent upon their destruction." Ernest B. Schoedsack told him to forget the idea because his Persian friends had informed him that a rail line now ran through the country, and much of the Bakhtiari's trek was now performed using cars and trucks.

== Reissue ==
Grass was reissued theatrically in the early 1990s. Rights to Grass had been donated to the Museum of Modern Art, and Milestone Film and Video obtained the rights in 1990. Dennis Doros of Milestone said:

Out of the one hundred and fifty to two hundred films we've done, Grass and Chang are among the ones I am most proud of distributing. Chang is a national treasure in Thailand. Grass has images of race and culture that don't exist anymore, it's been called the greatest migration in modern history, and I agree. The journey of the Bakhtiari is so astonishing, the power of those images is like a dream, the way they're constantly moving and climbing.

Grass has been issued in videocassette and DVD format. It is also available for streaming on the Criterion Channel.

In 2009, author Bahman Maghsoudlou published a book titled Grass: Untold Stories that includes background information and historical references related to the making of the film.
