= Surviving Paradise (2000 film) =

2000 film by Kamshad Kooshan

Surviving Paradise راز بهشت
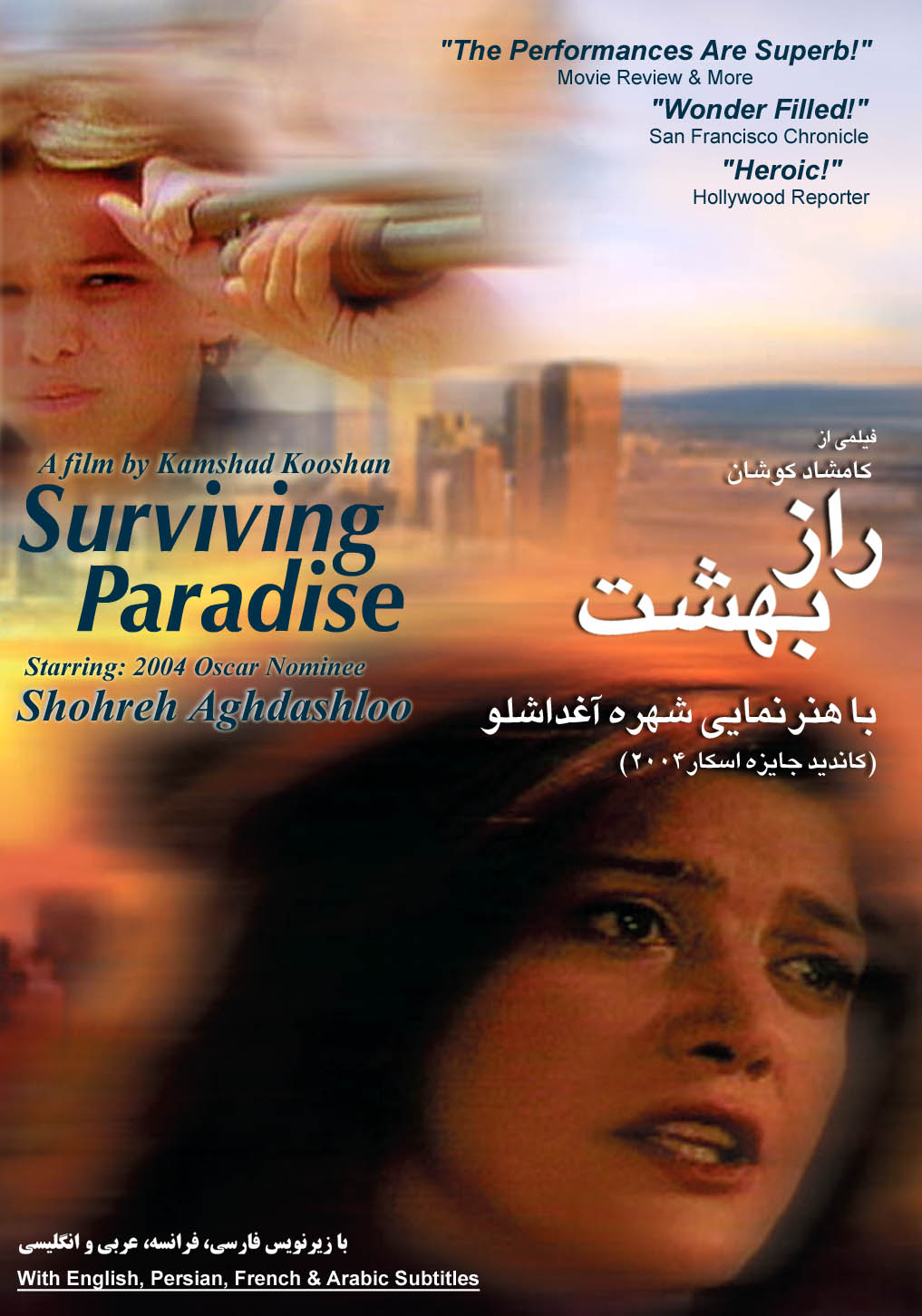
- Surviving Paradise, راز بهشت movie poster
- Directed by: Kamshad Kooshan
- Written by: Kamshad Kooshan
- Produced by: Kamshad Kooshan; Bahman Maghsoudlou
- Starring: Shohreh Aghdashloo; Kian Abedini; Lauren Parissa Abedini; Joe Alvarez
- Cinematography: Paul Mayne
- Edited by: Rick LeCompte
- Music by: Richard Herrera Lopez
- Distributed by: New Light Entertainment LLC (US)
- Release date: June 2000
- Running time: 86 minutes
- Country: United States
- Language: English

Surviving Paradise is a 2000 American family adventure/drama film written and directed by Kamshad Kooshan. With three months of theatrical release in major theaters in Southern California and the San Francisco Bay Area, it is considered to be the first English-language Iranian-American film distributed in the United States. It is one of the first to prominently feature Shohreh Aghdashloo in a Hollywood production.

The story concerns the struggles of a newly-arrived Iranian brother and sister in the rough as well as better-off neighborhoods of Los Angeles.

== Plot ==
When the 10-year-old boy Sam and his younger sister Sara arrived in Los Angeles with their mother, the only thing on their mind was to go to Disneyland. But things take a wrong turn when their mother is kidnapped by three armed members of the mafia. Realizing that the police can't find their uncle, their only relative in town at the time, these two helpless children take on the vast and unforgiving streets of Los Angeles to find him themselves. On their way they encounter a colorful cast of characters and frightening situations where their humanity and endurance are tested.

== Cast ==
- Shohreh Aghdashloo as Pari
- Kian Abedini as Sam
- Lauren Parissa Abedini as Sara
- Joe Alvarez as Mr. F
- David Jay Barry as Mr. A
- David Wissak as Mr. Z
- Otis Freeman as Lou
- Vahik Pirhamzei as Mo

== Critical reception ==
Kevin Thomas of the Los Angeles Times called the film "well-intended but awkward". Mick LaSalle also panned Surviving Paradise in the San Francisco Chronicle, describing the film as exemplifying the worst aspects of both American and Iranian cinema, and calling it a "low-budget mess", "poorly made", "aimless", and "overly sentimental". In the LA Weekly, Professor of Cinematic Arts Holly Willis called it "laughable", writing that it "proffers an astonishing array of cultural clichés in a flat-footed story".

== Awards and festivals ==
- New York International Independent Film Festival (2001)
- Sundance Screenwriter's Lab, semi-finalist 1997
- Cairo International Film Festival (2000)
- International Film Festival of India (2000)
- San Francisco Parent/Teacher Association
