= Congorilla (film) =

1932 film by Martin and Osa Johnson

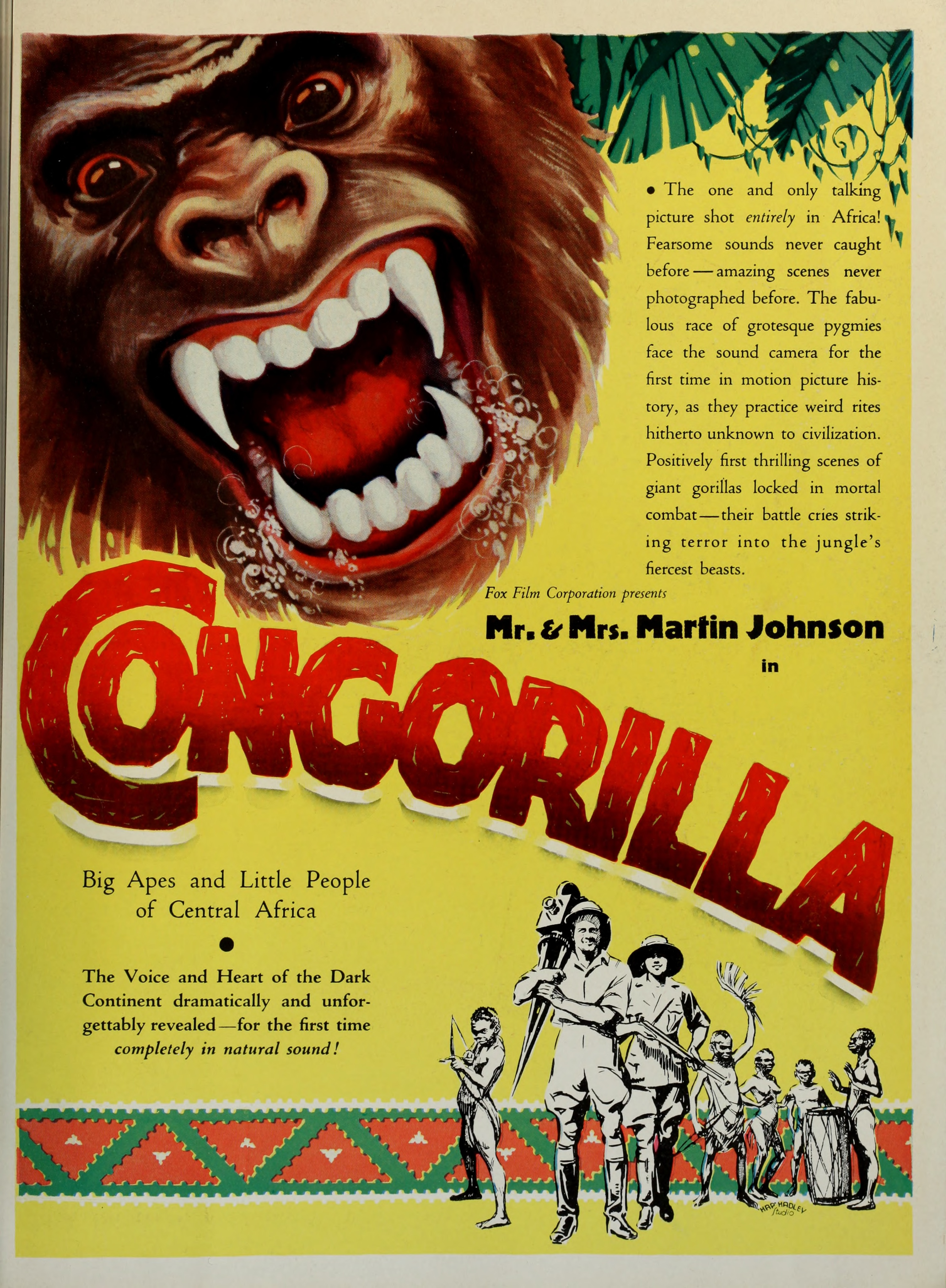
1932 advertisement

Congorilla (1932) is a documentary film by Martin and Osa Johnson. The film follows the couple through Africa as they encounter animals that they characterize as threatening before a lengthy sequence with the couple with a pygmy community. It was preceded by a book, Congorilla: Adventures with Pygmies and Gorillas in Africa (1931), which recounted the couple's travels and efforts to capture not only images but live gorillas.

It is considered one of the earliest ethnographic films.
