= Marjan (film) =

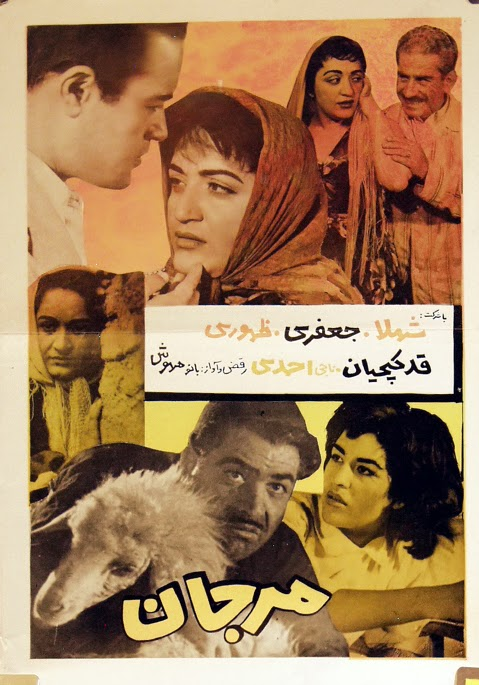
- Directed by: Shahla Riahi
- Written by: Mohammad Asemi; Manoochehr Keymaram
- Story by: Mohammad Asemi
- Produced by: Shahla Riahi
- Cinematography: Ahmad Shirazi
- Edited by: Ahmad Shirazi
- Music by: Hosein Dehlavi
- Release date: 9 September 1956 (Iran)
- Running time: 110 minutes
- Country: Iran
- Language: Persian

Marjan is a 1956 Persian language film. It was the first Persian feature film in the history of Iranian cinema to be produced and directed by a Persian woman, Shahla Riahi, a well-known actress and singer. The 110-minute 35mm, black-and-white film was produced by Arya Film. The story, written for the screen by Mohammad Asemi, concerns a tribe of gypsies that settle near a village.
