= Martin and Osa Johnson =

Married filmmaking duo

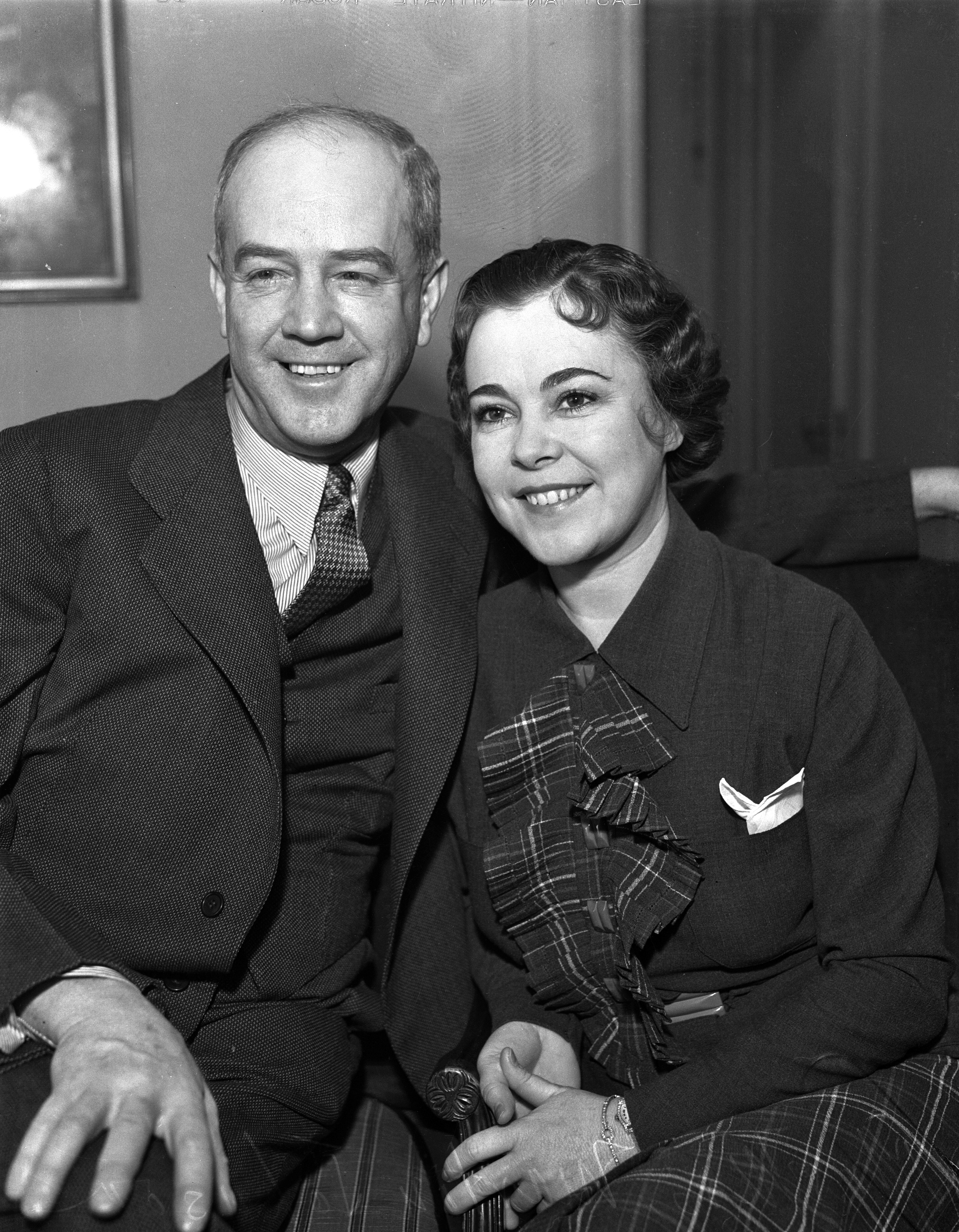
Martin and Osa Johnson

Martin Elmer Johnson (October 9, 1884 – January 13, 1937) and Osa Helen Johnson (née Leighty, March 14, 1894 – January 7, 1953) were married American adventurers and documentary filmmakers. Photographers, explorers, marketers, naturalists and authors, the Johnsons studied the wildlife and peoples of East and Central Africa, the South Pacific Islands and British North Borneo. In the first half of the 20th century, they explored other continents and brought back film footage and photographs, offering many Americans their first understanding of these foreign lands.

== Early Lives ==
Martin Elmer Johnson was born on October 9, 1884. Osa Leighty was born on March 14, 1894, and raised in Chanute, Kansas. Although born in Rockford, Illinois, Martin Johnson grew up in the Kansas towns of Lincoln and Independence. His father worked as a jeweler and would bring home crates labeled with European cities like Paris and Barcelona, inspiring Martin to stowaway on a ship to Europe as a teenager.

On his way back to Kansas, Martin Johnson read of Jack London’s plans to travel the world in a 45-foot boat, the Snark. Johnson wrote to London begging to be invited and received a telegraph simply asking if he could cook, to which Johnson replied: "Just try me." On the Snark, which sailed around the world from 1907 to 1909, Johnson had a variety of responsibilities. Later, he toured the United States displaying photographs and artifacts collected on the voyage. He met Osa Leighty while showing his travelogues at the theatre in Osa's hometown of Chanute, Kansas, where she was singing. They were married in May 1910 in Independence and spent the next seven years touring with Martin's travelogue in the US and Europe. Martin published his book Through the South Seas With Jack London in 1913.

== Safaris ==
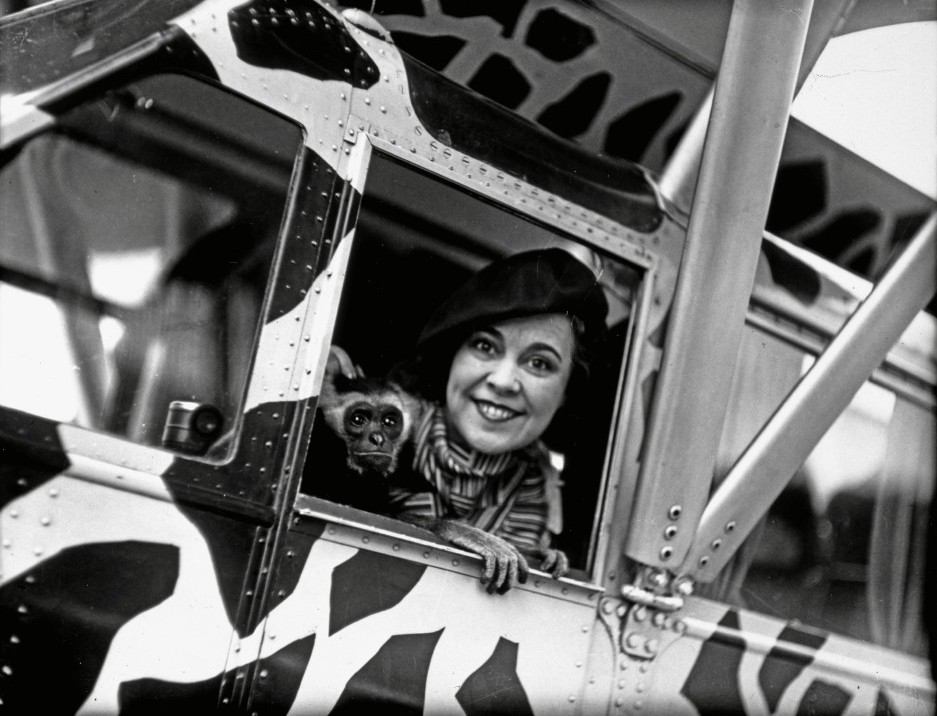
Osa with a gibbon in their S-39

In 1917, Martin and Osa departed on a nine-month trip through the New Hebrides (now Vanuatu) and the Solomon Islands. The highlight of the trip was a brief but harrowing encounter with the Big Nambas tribe of northern Malekula. Once there, the chief was not going to let them leave. The intervention of a British gunboat helped them escape. Their footage inspired the feature film Among the Cannibal Isles of the South Seas (1918).

The Johnsons returned to Malekula in 1919 to film the Big Nambas once again, this time with an armed escort. The escort proved unnecessary as the Big Nambas were disarmed by watching themselves in Among the Cannibal Isles of the South Seas. Martin and Osa finished their trip in 1920 with visits to British North Borneo (now Sabah) and a sailing expedition up the coast of East Africa. After returning home, they released the features Jungle Adventures (1921) and Headhunters of the South Seas (1922).

The Johnsons' first African expedition, from 1921 to 1922, resulted in their feature film Trailing Wild African Animals (1923).

During the second and longest trip, from 1924 to 1927, the Johnsons spent much of their time in northern Kenya by a lake they dubbed Paradise, at Mount Marsabit. The movies Martin's Safari (1928), Osa's Four Years in Paradise (1941), and the film Simba: King of the Beasts (1928) were made with footage of these trips.

In 1925, Osa and Martin met the Duke and Duchess of York, later King George VI and Queen Elizabeth, while on safari in Kenya.

The third African safari from 1927 to 1928 was a tour of the Nile with friend and supporter George Eastman, founder of Eastman Kodak. Film of this trip, along with previous footage, was made into one of the first talkies for the Johnsons, Across the World with Mr. and Mrs. Johnson (1930), a cinema serial which included Martin's narrative.

In 1928, three Eagle Scouts were selected in national competition to go on safari with the Johnsons in East Africa: Robert Dick Douglas, Jr., of North Carolina, David R. Martin, Jr., of Minnesota, and Douglas L. Oliver of Georgia. The three scouts co-authored the 1928 book Three Boy Scouts in Africa: on Safari with Martin Johnson. In later life, Douglas (1912-2015) was an attorney, Martin (1913-2004) became an executive in the Boy Scouts of America, and Oliver (1913-2009) was an Emeritus Professor of Anthropology at both Harvard University and the University of Hawaii.

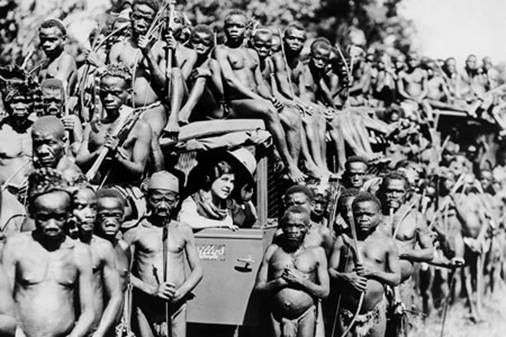
Osa Johnson with Mbuti pygmies in 1930.

From 1929 to 1931, the Johnsons spent a fourth tour in Africa in the Belgian Congo. There they filmed the Mbuti people of the Ituri Forest and the gorillas in the Alumbongo Hills. The 1932 feature movie Congorilla was in part a product of this trip, and was the first movie with sound authentically recorded in Africa.

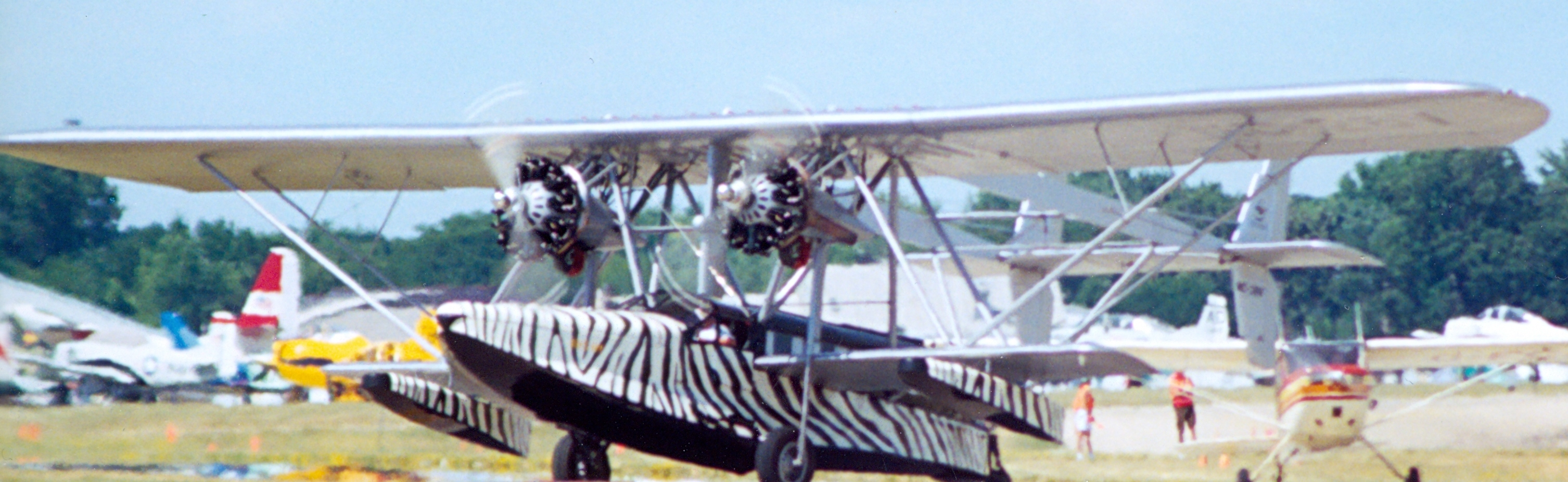
Osa's Ark S-38

In 1932, the Johnsons learned to fly at the Chanute Municipal Airport (now named the Chanute Martin Johnson Airport) in Osa's hometown of Chanute. Once they had their pilot's licenses, they purchased two Sikorsky amphibious planes, a S-39-CS Spirit of Africa and S-38-BS Osa's Ark. On their fifth African trip, from 1933 to 1934, the Johnsons flew the length of Africa, getting now classic aerial scenes of large herds of elephants, giraffes, and other animals moving across the plains of Africa. They were the first pilots to fly over Mount Kilimanjaro and Mount Kenya in Africa and film them from the air. The 1935 feature film Baboona was made from this footage.

On January 3, 1935, Baboona was shown on an Eastern Air Lines plane, becoming the first sound movie shown during flight. The movie premiered on January 22, 1935, at the Rialto Theatre in New York City. In 1935, the Johnsons were featured on Wheaties cereal boxes as "Champions of Sports." Osa Johnson was the second female to appear on the box and she and Martin were the first married couple selected for this honor.

The Johnsons' final trip together took them to British North Borneo again, from 1935 to 1936. They used their smaller amphibious plane, now renamed The Spirit of Africa and Borneo, and produced footage for the feature Borneo (1937). Martin Johnson was a member of the Adventurers' Club of New York. He described the Borneo expedition before the club on November 19, 1936, the event being called "Martin Johnson Night." He previewed his "Borneo Pictures" before the group on December 17, 1936.

In January 1937, Martin and Osa began a nationwide lecture and radio tour at the Mormon Tabernacle in Salt Lake City. On the morning of January 12, they boarded a flight bound for Las Vegas and Burbank. The plane crashed in bad weather near the Los Pinetos peak in California. Martin died the following day. Osa was severely injured but recovered and gave hundreds of lectures from a wheelchair. By October 1937, The New York Times was publishing dispatches of Osa's latest trip to Africa, in which she described lifestyles and practices of the Maasai and other tribes. She died in New York City of a heart attack in 1953.

Osa Johnson's autobiography I Married Adventure was the best-selling non-fiction book of 1940.

== Osa Johnson's The Big Game Hunt ==
Television's first wildlife series, Osa Johnson's The Big Game Hunt a.k.a. The Big Game Hunt, premiered in 1952. The 26 half-hour episodes were released by Explorers Pictures and primarily used Johnson film. Episodes introduced by Osa Johnson were "African Army," "Boy Scouts in Africa," "Climbing Fish, The Floating Terror, Giant Elephants, Goring Brutes, Headhunters of Borneo, Jungle Panic, Jungle Power," "Jungle Warriors," "Rhinoceros," "Simba's Trail," "Slinking Fury" and "Weird Tribes." Episodes introduced by Ivan T. Sanderson were "Armed Menace," "Cameras in the Wilderness," "Herds of Destruction," "Jaws of Death," "Kill to Live," "Man-Eaters of the Masai," "Monkey Safari," "Orang-utan," "Pygmy Hunters," "Return to Adventure," "Terror of the Plains" and "Trek Through the Wild Lands."

== Martin and Osa Johnson Safari Museum ==
The Martin and Osa Johnson Safari Museum is located in Osa's hometown of Chanute, Kansas. Formed in 1961, the Safari Museum (as it was originally named) started with a core collection of the Johnsons' films, photographs, manuscripts, articles, books, and personal belongings donated by Osa's mother.

In 1998, the Martin and Osa Johnson Safari Museum was named by the History Channel Traveler website as one of the "Top-Ten Historic Sites for Valentine's Day" that "capture romance, American-style." In 2001, The Pitch (newspaper) named Chanute, Kansas, and the museum as "Best Romantic Day Trip."

== Sister museums – Musée de Manega and Sabah Museum ==
The Martin and Osa Johnson Safari Museum has two international sister museums: Musée de Manega in Burkina Faso and Sabah Museum in Sabah, Malaysia. These partnerships resulted from curatorial exchanges in 2000 and 2004 through the International Partnerships Among Museums program.

On February 22, 2011, the Sabah Museum opened its "Safari in Sandakan" exhibit at the Sandakan Heritage Museum in Sabah, Malaysia. This exhibit covers the Johnsons' 1920 and 1935-1936 Borneo expeditions and was designed by Sabah Museum Curator Stella Moo.

The SUARA Community Filmmaking, in partnership with the Sabah Museum and the Sabah Society, has agreed on premiering the last film of Osa and Martin Johnson's last adventure in North Borneo. It was premiered on 30 September 2012 at the Borneo Eco Film Festival as it was the first time shown in Borneo.

== Disney's Animal Kingdom Lodge ==
The Walt Disney Company was the first organization to license Johnson film from the Martin and Osa Johnson Safari Museum for the 1976 program Filming Nature's Mysteries. Disney again licensed Johnson film as part of the "Rafiki's Planet Watch" at Disney's Animal Kingdom when it opened April 22, 1998.

The architects and Disney team developing a new "safari lodge" borrowed Johnson films from the museum in 1997 and 1998 for research and inspiration. Disney's Animal Kingdom Lodge opened April 16, 2001. Included is an ongoing exhibit of 36 Johnson photographs along with an original copy of Osa Johnson's 1940 autobiography I Married Adventure in the lodge's Sunset Lounge.

== Martin + Osa ==
Martin and Osa Johnson were the namesake, inspiration and background story for the 2006-2010 Martin + Osa clothing line and national chain of 28 Martin + Osa stores launched by American Eagle Outfitters. Martin + Osa used references to the Johnsons on their clothing and accessories. Examples included "1910" (the year Martin and Osa married), "S-38" (refers to the Sikorsky S-38 amphibian airplane flown by the Johnsons) and "NC-52V" (the aircraft registration number of their Sikorsky S-39). In 2016 the Martin and Osa Johnson Safari Museum acquired the Martin + Osa trademarks.

== Other references ==
- Osa Johnson (also known as The Woman in the Safari Outfit) is a main character in the 1962 play Chamber Music by Arthur Kopit.
- It has been noted the animated film Up (2009) contains story elements similar to the Johnsons’ real-life story. This ranges from a childless couple to a “scout” on the trip. Muntz's airship, named Spirit of Adventure, sounds like a cross between the Johnsons’ Spirit of Africa plane and Osa's popular I Married Adventure autobiography. A fictional poster promotes the launch of the “Spirit of Adventure” on April 25, 1934, from New York City. Coincidentally this was the starting point and the time frame of the Johnsons’ 1933-1934 “Flying Safari”. Also, the Fredricksens’ dream of a home overlooking “Paradise Falls” is reminiscent of the home the Johnsons built overlooking “Lake Paradise” or “Paradise Lake”.
- In 2005, the Cairo Club Orchestra of Melbourne, Australia, revived the 1932 Congorilla Fox-Trot (inspired by the Johnsons' 1932 movie Congorilla).
- Martin and Osa Johnson photographs appear in the movies Lemony Snicket's A Series of Unfortunate Events (2004) and Night at the Museum (2006) as well as the short film The Lost Explorer (2010) by Tim Walker. Johnson film segments were used in Su Friedrich's film Hide and Seek (1996).
- In 2010, Martin and Osa Johnson were voted one of the 8 Wonders of Kansas! People (Kansas Sampler Foundation).
- Poet Elizabeth Bishop's poem "In the Waiting Room" references a picture of Martin and Osa Johnson in a February, 1918 National Geographic she read as a child.
- Martin Johnson is sarcastically referenced in "The Baby in the Icebox," a short story by James M. Cain that was first published in the American Mercury magazine in 1932.
- In 1934, Martin and Osa Johnson became the first married couple, and Osa only the second woman, featured on a box of Wheaties breakfast cereal. Beginning that year Wheaties put pictures of well-known people on cereal boxes to match the slogan ”The Breakfast of Champions.” Martin and Osa are pictured atop their Sikorsky S-39 amphibious plane. (See List of athletes on Wheaties boxes.)

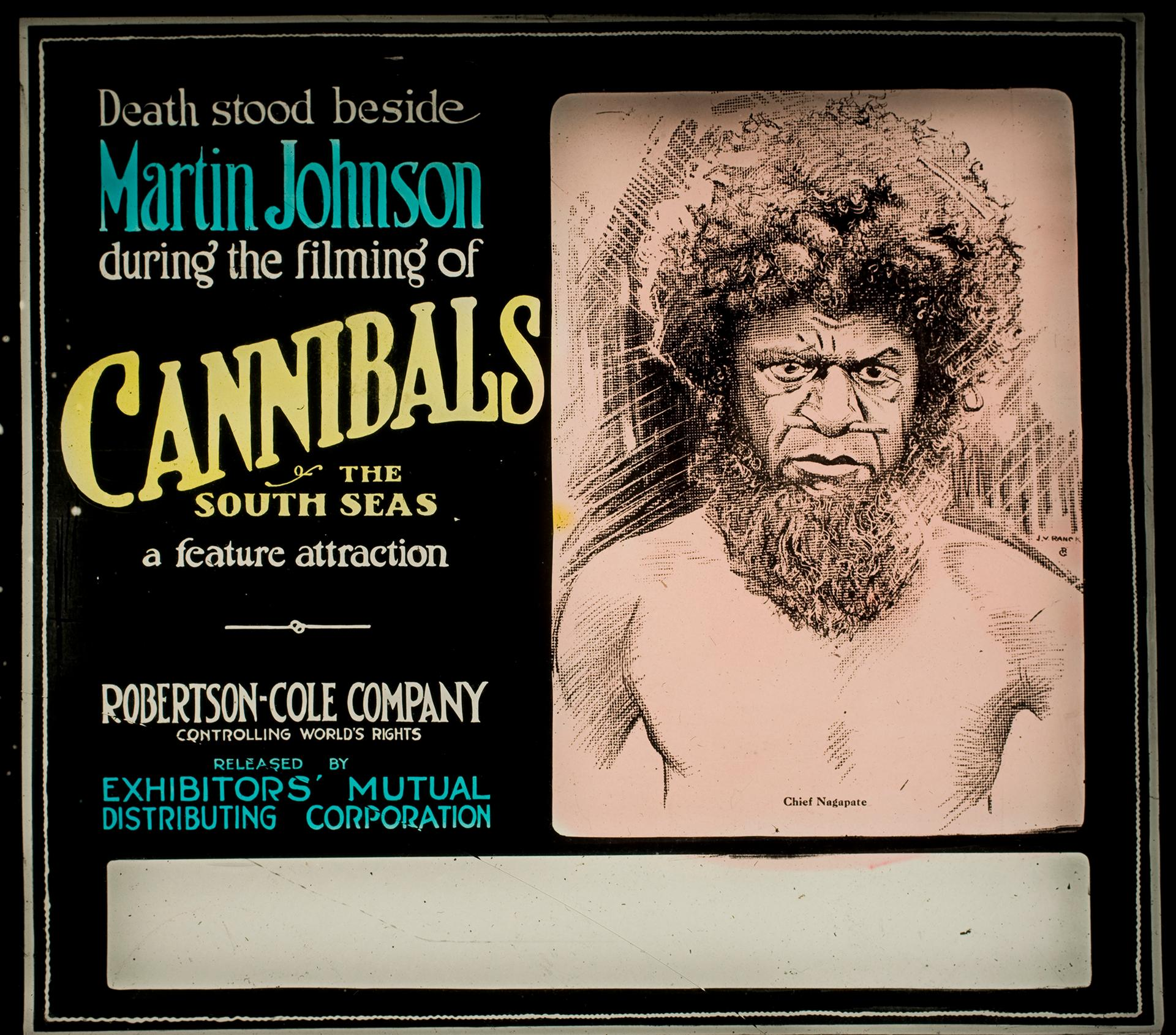
Lantern slide for the film Cannibals of the South Seas (1912)

== Selected filmography ==
- Cannibals of the South Seas (1912)
- Jack London's Adventures of the South Seas (1913)
- Among the Cannibal Isles of the South Seas (1918)
- Jungle Adventures (1921) (filmed in British North Borneo)
- Headhunters of the South Seas (1922)
- Trailing Wild African Animals (1923)
- Martin's Safari (1928)
- Simba: King of the Beasts (1928)
- Across the World with Mr. and Mrs. Johnson (1930)
- Wonders of the Congo (1931)
- Congorilla (1932)
- Wings Over Africa (1934)
- Baboona (1935)
- Children of Africa (1937)
- Jungle Depths of Borneo (1937)
- Borneo (1937) (filmed in British North Borneo)
- Jungles Calling (1937)
- I Married Adventure (1940)
- African Paradise (1941)
- Tulagi and the Solomons (1943)
- Big Game Hunt (1950s), on TV

== Bibliography ==
- Johnson, Martin (1929). Lion: African Adventure With the King of Beasts. New York - London: G.P. Putnam's Sons.
- Johnson, Osa, "A Wife in Africa," Photoplay, June 1923, p. 32. Bylined Mrs. Martin Johnson.
