= Shahla Riahi =

Iranian actress (1927–2019)

- شهلا ریاحی
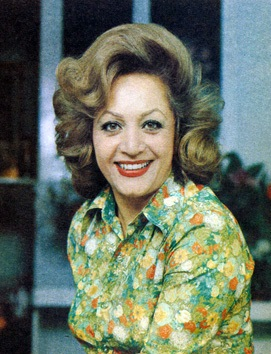
- Shahla Riahi in 1970s
- Born: Ghodratzaman Vafadoost; 10 September 1926; Tehran, Iran
- Died: 31 December 2019 (aged 93); Tehran, Iran
- Resting place: Behesht-e Zahra Cemetery
- Occupations: Actress, director
- Years active: 1951–2000
- Spouse: Esmaeel Riahi (m. 1942; died 2010)
- Children: 2
- Parents: Agha Sheykh Vafadoost (father); Zahra Asgari (mother)

Shahla Riahi (Persian: شهلا ریاحی Šahlâ Riyâhi, 10 September 1926 – 31 December 2019) was an Iranian actress and film director.

Born in Tehran, she started stage acting in 1944 and first appeared in cinema in Golden Dreams. In 1956 she became the first Iranian woman to direct a feature, with Marjan. Her career as a film actress includes more than 72 features.

Riahi died on 31 December 2019 at the age of 93.
