= The Report (1977 film) =

- Directed by: Abbas Kiarostami
- Written by: Abbas Kiarostami
- Produced by: Bahman Farmanara
- Starring: Shohreh Aghdashloo
- Release date: 1977 (Iran)
- Running time: 112 minutes
- Language: Persian

The Report (Persian: گزارش, Gozāresh) is a 1977 Iranian drama film directed by Abbas Kiarostami and starring Shohreh Aghdashloo.

== Plot summary ==
A civil servant at the Ministry of Finance, Mahmad Firuzkui, is accused of taking bribes, at the same time as his marriage is crumbling and his wife is threatening to leave him.

The film can be split into two halves. The first deals with corruption in the collection of property taxes in Iran's Ministry of Finance, where junior administrators demand bribes from the public, drink tea rather than doing productive work, and carry on an active nightlife in drinking establishments and gambling dens/casinos. (The movie includes a pub conversation among regular folks about the importance of being honest and being respected for money earned honestly.)

The second half of the film deals with the family life of Firuzkui, a corrupt young clerk in the Ministry of Finance. He's married to an attractive, caring wife (Shohreh Aghdashloo), whom he dominates. He has a very young daughter, whom he seems to love but who is cared for primarily by his wife. His wife and he bicker about money continually. An order of eviction is served on them, and his response is, "The law says that they can't evict us for at least two years"; there is no sense that he might pay the rent. Eventually, they have such an intense argument that she threatens to leave and packs her suitcase; he tells her to take their daughter, but when she does he changes his mind and grabs her. While the little girl cries, he drags his wife into another room and beats her up. He then takes the girl to the car and drives to a store where he can get a beer, leaving her in the car while he drinks. When he returns to the apartment, he discovers his wife passed out, having taken an overdose of pills. He drives her to the hospital, where a doctor reassures him that the pills won't kill her; he stays in the room by her comatose body and looks out the window into the winter night, while his daughter stays in the cold car below.

== Cast ==
- Kurosh Afsharpanah as Mahmad Firuzkui
- Shohreh Aghdashloo as Azam Firuzkui
- Mostafa Tari as Mr. Asadi

== See also ==
- List of Iranian films
