= Bijan Tehrani (director) =

Iranian writer and director

- بیژن تهرانی
- Born: Hassan Mosharraf Azad Tehrani; 1944 (age 81–82)
- Website: cinemawithoutborders.com

Bijan Tehrani also known as Hassan Tehrani (born 1944) is an Iranian writer, film critic and film director and the founder and editor-in-chief of the website Cinema Without Borders. He is also the Director for the East Los Angeles College Annual Animation Film Festival.

Bijan's short films and children's books have won numerous honors at international film festivals and book fairs among them, the Iranian Best Book of the Year Award for his book The Yellow Leaf. He is the brother of Mahmoud Mosharraf Azad Tehrani.

During his years in Iranian cinema and television, he has produced around 200 documentaries and short tales, some of which have won international honors. International festivals have recognized The Towers and Children's Olympics from his compositions in the city of Jaleh.

Tehrani's first book Hear from the reed which was first published in the early 1960s has been reprinted 13 times, and 275,000 have been printed in total.

For many years, Hassan Tehrani, also known as Bijan in the United States, has taught at the Los Angeles College of Film and Cinema.

== Works ==
=== Films ===
- Mozaffar
- Children of Jaleh Square
- Kids’ Olympics
- Ali Kuchulu (Little Ali)

=== Books ===
- The Yellow Leaf
- Hear to the Reed

== Awards and recognition ==
- Head of Jury for the 2022 Palm Springs International Film Festival awards.
