= Shohreh Aghdashloo =

Iranian actress (born 1952)

- شهره آغداشلو
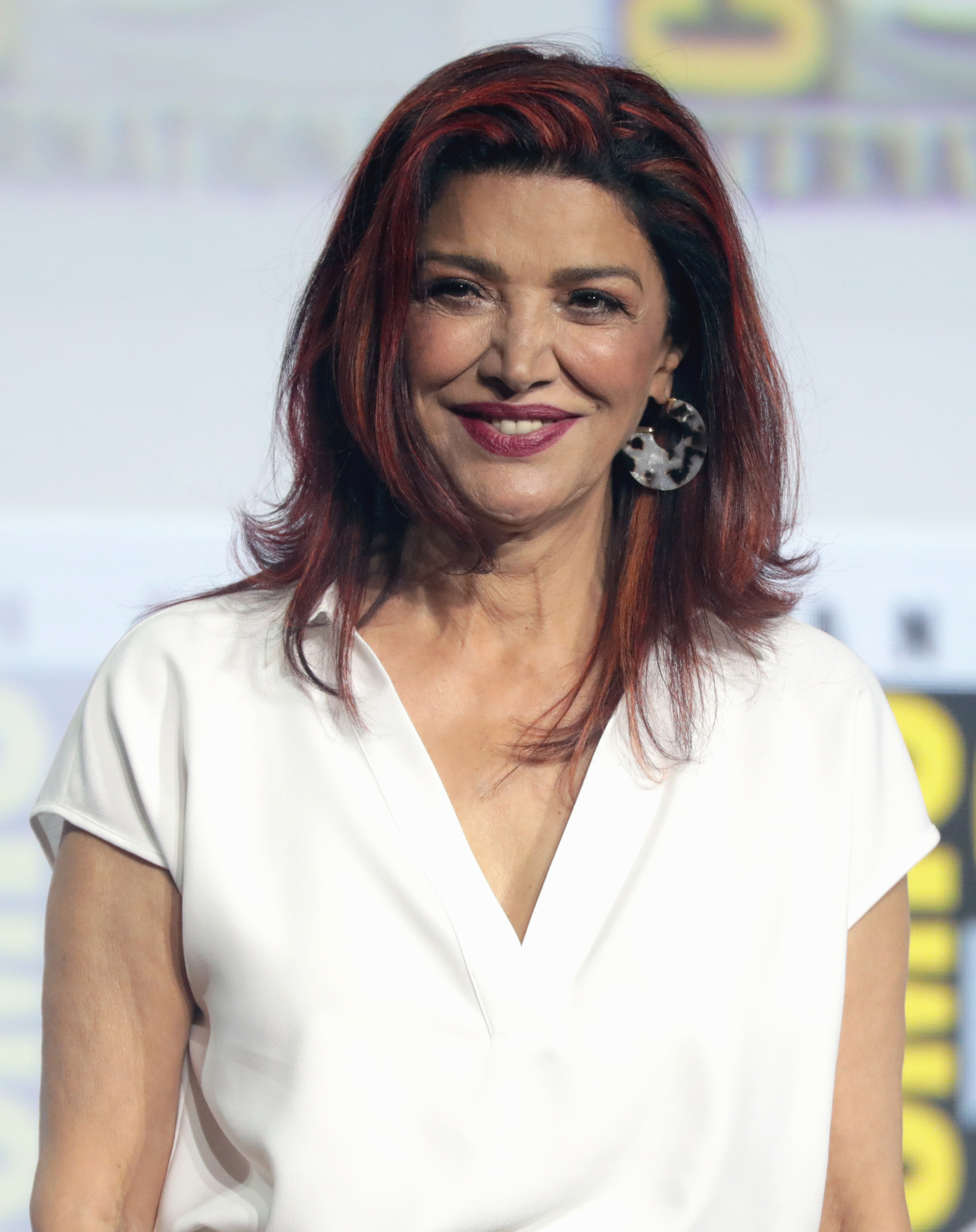
- Aghdashloo at San Diego Comic-Con in 2019
- Born: Shohreh Vaziri-Tabar; May 11, 1952 (age 74); Tehran, Imperial State of Iran
- Citizenship: Iran; United States
- Education: Brunel University
- Occupation: Actress
- Years active: 1976–present
- Spouses: Aydin Aghdashloo (m. 1972; div. 1980) Houshang Touzie (m. 1987)
- Children: 1

Shohreh Aghdashloo (/ʃə.ˈreɪ/; Persian: شهره آغداشلو, pronounced [ʃohˈɾe ɒɢdɒˈʃluː]; born Vaziri-Tabar, (Note: Persian: وزیری‌تبار) May 11, 1952) is an Iranian and American actress. She has received various accolades, including a Primetime Emmy Award and a Satellite Award, in addition to a nomination for an Academy Award.

Following numerous starring roles on the stage, she made her film debut in Chess of the Wind (1976). Her next two films The Report (1977) and Sooteh Delan (1977) garnered critical acclaim and established Aghdashloo as one of Iran's leading ladies, although the films were banned in Iran itself.

Aghdashloo moved to England during the Iranian Revolution in 1979 and then to the United States, subsequently becoming a U.S. citizen. After several years playing small roles in television and film, her performance in House of Sand and Fog (2003) brought her several film critics' awards and a nomination for an Academy Award for Best Supporting Actress. Her other film appearances include The Exorcism of Emily Rose (2005), X-Men: The Last Stand and The Nativity Story (both 2006), The Odd Life of Timothy Green (2012) and Star Trek Beyond (2016).

In television, she is best known for her roles as Dina Araz in the fourth season of 24 and as Chrisjen Avasarala on The Expanse (2015–2022). For her role as Sajida Talfah in the HBO miniseries House of Saddam (2008), she won the Primetime Emmy Award for Outstanding Supporting Actress in a Limited Series or Movie. In 2013, she released her autobiography titled The Alley of Love and Yellow Jasmines. In 2021, she voiced Grayson in Netflix's series Arcane. In 2024, Aghdashloo voiced the unnamed dragon in the 2024 Netflix film Damsel. She also voiced Admiral Raan in Mass Effect 2 & 3, and Roshan in 2023's Assassin's Creed Mirage.

== Early life ==
Aghdashloo earned a bachelor's degree in international relations at Brunel University of London because of her interest in politics after having to leave her home country. She was already familiar with England, as her parents had taken her to London as a child. She then continued to pursue her acting career, which brought her to Los Angeles. She has since performed in a number of her husband Houshang Touzie's plays, successfully taking them to national and international stages, primarily in the Iranian diaspora. Though born to a Muslim family, she has stated that she is non-practicing.

== Career ==
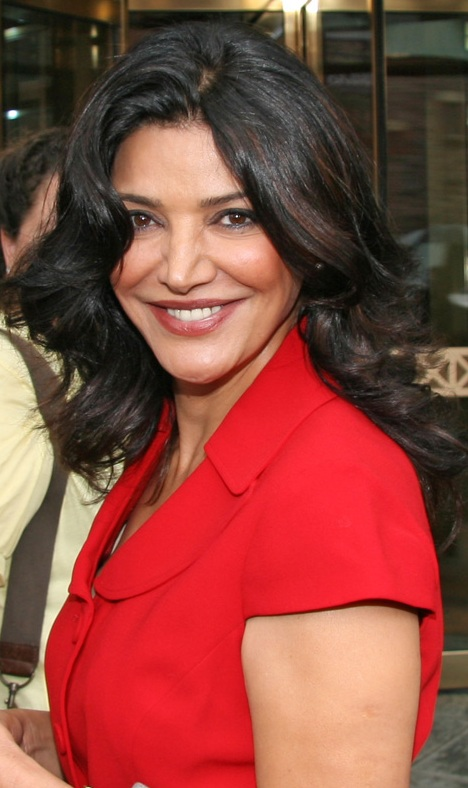
Aghdashloo in 2008

Aghdashloo first began working as a theatre actress at the age of 19, when she starred in a theatrical adaptation of the novel The Narrow Road to the Deep North (1973). Aghdashloo made her American film debut in 1989 in a starring role in Guests of Hotel Astoria. Her television debut came on September 25, 1990, in a guest role in the two-hour episode of the NBC television series Matlock, titled "Nowhere to Turn: A Matlock Mystery Movie". In the years that followed Aghdashloo appeared on screen sporadically, including in the widely panned Surviving Paradise (2000), written and directed by Kamshad Kooshan.

In 2001 Aghdashloo was cast opposite Ben Kingsley and Jennifer Connelly in director Vadim Perelman's House of Sand and Fog (2003) for which she was nominated for the Academy Award for Best Supporting Actress. Following this exposure Aghdashloo had a prominent recurring role in Season 4 of the Fox television series 24, playing Dina Araz, a terrorist undercover in Los Angeles as a well-to-do housewife and mother. In an interview with Time magazine, Aghdashloo stated that although she had previously resisted reinforcing the stereotype of Muslims as terrorists, the strength and complexity of the role convinced her to accept it. In the period that followed, Aghdashloo made guest appearances on several well-known television series, such as Will & Grace, ER and Grey's Anatomy. She also played supporting roles in films such as X-Men: The Last Stand as Dr. Kavita Rao, The Lake House, The Nativity Story as Elizabeth, and The Sisterhood of the Traveling Pants 2.

In 2008, Aghdashloo served as an official festival judge at the second annual Noor Iranian Film Festival in Los Angeles, while she also played the lead character of Zahra Khanum in the film The Stoning of Soraya M., marking her first leading role in a feature-length American film. Film scholar Hamid Naficy criticized her role in the film as "discredit[ing] her vow not to play in films that stereotype Middle Easterners, including Iranians." In the same year, she also portrayed Sajida Talfah in the HBO original miniseries House of Saddam for which she received the Primetime Emmy Award for Outstanding Supporting Actress in a Limited Series or Movie. Speaking to a crowd of over 1,400 people at George Washington University's Lisner Auditorium on September 12, 2009, Aghdashloo, author Dr. Azar Nafisi, and Dr. Dwight Bashir, Associate Director for Policy at the United States Commission on International Religious Freedom, added their voices to those concerned about human rights in Iran and the persecution of Baháʼís in Iran. Aghdashloo's talk in particular was posted to YouTube. On October 9, 2010, the Public Affairs Alliance of Iranian Americans awarded Aghdashloo their Career Achievement Award during its first annual gala.

Aghdashloo continues to act in films, such as The Odd Life of Timothy Green, Septembers of Shiraz and Star Trek Beyond; and on television, guest starring on series such as House, M.D., The Simpsons, Grimm, Law & Order: Special Victims Unit and NCIS. She also voiced characters for the video games Mass Effect 2, Mass Effect 3, Destiny, Destiny 2, and Assassin's Creed Mirage; starred in the London revival of the play The House of Bernarda Alba at the Almeida Theatre as Bernarda Alba; and narrated the audiobook And the Mountains Echoed, by Khaled Hosseini.

From 2015 to 2022, Aghdashloo starred in Amazon Prime Video's television series The Expanse as UN Deputy Undersecretary of Executive Administration Chrisjen Avasarala, a "smart and passionate member of a political family legacy who has risen high in the ranks of Earth's governing body without once standing for election". In 2025, she portrayed Elaida a'Roihan in season three of the Amazon series The Wheel of Time.

== Filmography ==
=== Film ===
Year	Title	Role	Notes
1976	Chess of the Wind	Kanizak	First film role in Iran, directed by Mohammed Reza Aslani
1977	The Report	Azam Firuzkui	
1978	Sooteh-Delan	Aghdas	
1989	Guests of Hotel Astoria	Mrs. Pori Karemnia	First American film role
1991	Raha	Raha	
1993	Twenty Bucks	Ghada Holiday	
2000	Surviving Paradise	Pari	First English language Iranian-American feature film distributed theatrically in the United States, written and directed by Kamshad Kooshan
2001	America So Beautiful	Exiled Actress	
2002	Maryam	Mrs. Homa Armin	
2003	Possessed	Woman	Short film by Shirin Neshat
2003	Pulse	Woman	Short film by Shirin Neshat
2003	Mystic Iran	Narrator	Documentary film by Aryana Farshad
2003	House of Sand and Fog	Nadereh 'Nadi' Behrani	Independent Spirit Award for Best Supporting Female; Los Angeles Film Critics Association Award for Best Supporting Actress; National Society of Film Critics Award for Best Supporting Actress (3rd place); New York Film Critics Circle Award for Best Supporting Actress; Online Film Critics Society Award for Best Supporting Actress; Nominated–Academy Award for Best Supporting Actress; Nominated–Vancouver Film Critics Circle Award for Best Supporting Actress
2005	The Exorcism of Emily Rose	Dr. Sadira Adani	
2005	Babak and Friends – A First Norooz	Farah	Voice role
2006	American Dreamz	Mrs. Nazneen Riza	
2006	The Lake House	Dr. Anna Klyczynski	
2006	X-Men: The Last Stand	Dr. Kavita Rao	
2006	The Nativity Story	Elizabeth	
2008	The Sisterhood of the Traveling Pants 2	Professor Nasrin Mehani	
2008	The Stoning of Soraya M.	Zahra Khanum	Satellite Award for Best Actress – Motion Picture
2010	The Adjustment Bureau	The Chairman	Scenes deleted
2010	The No Game	Aunt Laila	
2011	Iranium	Narrator	Documentary film by Alex Traiman
2011	On the Inside	Dr. Lofton	
2012	The Odd Life of Timothy Green	Evette Onat	
2013	Percy Jackson: Sea of Monsters	The Oracle	Voice role
2013	Silk	Rani	Short film by Catherine Dent
2014	Rosewater	Moloojoon	
2014	Still Here	Farzaneh	Short film by Ethan Rains
2015	Last Knights	Maria	
2015	Septembers of Shiraz	Habibeh	
2016	Star Trek Beyond	Commodore Paris	
2016	Window Horses	Mehrnaz	Voice role
2016	The Promise	Marta Boghosian	
2018	A Simple Wedding	Ziba Husseini	Also executive producer
2019	The Cuban	Bano Ayoub	Film directed by Sergio Navarretta
2020	Run Sweetheart Run	“First Lady” Dinah	
2021	Ghostbusters: Afterlife	Gozer the Gozerian	Voice role; role shared with Olivia Wilde and Emma Portner
2023	Renfield	Bellafrancesca Lobo	
2024	Damsel	Dragon	Voice role
2024	Man and Witch: The Dance of a Thousand Steps	The Wise Woman	
2024	Deadly Vows	Melody	Also known as Still Smiling
2026	Royally Screwed	Queen Lenora	
TBA	The Alchemist		Post-production

=== Television ===
Year	Title	Role	Notes
1990	Matlock	Saleslady	Episode: "Nowhere to Turn"
1993	Martin	Malika	Episode: "Jerome's in the House"
1994	The Bold & The Beautiful	Greesa Abineer	Episode #1865
2001	The Honduran Suburbs	Zereshk	2 episodes
2004	The Secret Service	Lila Ravan	Television film
2005	24	Dina Araz	12 episodes: Day 4 Gold Derby TV Award for Best Drama Supporting Actress; Nominated—Satellite Award for Best Supporting Actress – Series, Miniseries or Television Film
2006	Smith	Charlie	7 episodes
2006	Will & Grace	Pam	Episode: "Cowboys and Iranians"
2006	Curious George	Hat Salesperson	Voice role, episode: "The Clean, Perfect Yellow Hat"
2006	ER	Mrs. Riza Kardatay	Episode: "Lost in America"
2007	Grey's Anatomy	Dr. Helen Crawford	Episode: "Scars and Souvenirs"
2008	House of Saddam	Sajida Talfah	4 episodes Primetime Emmy Award for Outstanding Supporting Actress in a Limited Series or Movie; Nominated—Gold Derby TV Award for Best Miniseries/TV Movie Supporting Actress
2008	The Simpsons	Mina	Voice role, episode: "MyPods and Boomsticks"
2009	FlashForward	Nhadra Udaya	3 episodes
2011	Law & Order: Special Victims Unit	Detective Saliyah "Sunny" Qadri	Episode: "Dirty"
2011	House	Afsoun Hamidi	Episode: "Moving On"
2011	NCIS	Mariam Bawali	Episode: "Safe Harbor"
2012	Portlandia	Nelofar Jamshidi	Episode: "Cool Wedding"
2012	The Mob Doctor	Dr. Lauren Baylor	3 episodes
2013	Grimm	Stefania Vaduva Popescu	7 episodes
2014	Believe	Mrs. Delkash	Episode: "Origin"
2014	Bones	Azita Vaziri	Episode: "The Cold in the Case"
2014	Scorpion	Dr. Cassandra Davis	Episode: "True Colors"
2015	Elementary	Donya Esfandiari	Episode: "Tag, You're Me"
2015–2022	The Expanse	Chrisjen Avasarala	Main role 6 seasons
2016	Pearl	Arlene	TV film
2017	The Punisher	Farah Madani	4 episodes
2019	The Lion Guard	Queen Janna	Voice role, 4 episodes
2019	Impulse	Fatima	3 episodes
2021	Arcane	Enforcer Grayson	Voice role, 4 episodes
2021	The Expanse: One Ship	Chrisjen Avasarala	Webisodes; 1 episode
2022	The Flight Attendant	Brenda	5 episodes
2022	Archer	ClandestiCon Host	Voice role, episode: "The Big Con"
2023	Kung Fu Panda: The Dragon Knight	Forouzan	Voice role, 13 episodes
2023	Mrs. Davis	Virgin Mary	Episode: "Great Gatsby 2001: A Space Odyssey"
2024	Chad	Zahra	Episode: "Maman Bozorg"
2024	WondLa	Darius	Voice role, episode: "Chapter 4: Ghosts"
2024	The Penguin	Nadia Maroni	Miniseries; 4 episodes
2025	The Wheel of Time	Elaida a'Roihan	Season 3
2025	Creature Commandos	Madam Gyurov	Voice role, episode 6 "Priyatel Skelet"

=== Video games ===
Year	Game	Voice role	Notes
2010	Mass Effect 2	Admiral Shala'Raan vas Tonbay	
2012	Mass Effect 3	Admiral Shala'Raan vas Tonbay	
2014	Destiny	Lakshmi-2/Maya Sundaresh	
2017-2025	Destiny 2	Lakshmi-2/Maya Sundaresh	
2022	The Tale of Bistun	Narrator	
2022	Assassin's Creed Valhalla	Roshan bint-La'Ahad	"Shared History" DLC
2023	Assassin's Creed Mirage	Roshan bint-La'Ahad	
2023	The Expanse: A Telltale Series	Chrisjen Avasarala	
2024	Ara: History Untold	Narrator	

=== Audio ===
Year	Title	Role	Notes
2004	Inside the Kingdom: My Life in Saudi Arabia	Narrator	Audiobook
2007	The Blood of Flowers	Narrator	Audiobook
2008	The Bible of Clay	Narrator	Audiobook
2008	And the Mountains Echoed	Narrator	Audiobook
2016	Until We Are Free: My Fight for Human Rights in Iran	Narrator	Audiobook
2019–2020	The Two Princes	Queen Attosa	Audio drama

=== Theatre ===
Year	Title	Role	Playwright
1973	A Narrow Road to the Deep North	Empress Jun	Edward Bond
1975	Madame de Sade	Reneé Marquise de Sade	Yukio Mishima
2012	The House of Bernarda Alba	Bernarda Alba	Federico Garcia Lorca
2024	What Became of Us	Q	Shayan Lotfi

== Other awards ==
- 2007: Arpa Career Achievement Award
- 2013: Noor Iranian Film Festival Achievement Award

== Personal life ==
In 1987, Aghdashloo married actor/playwright Houshang Touzie. They have a daughter, Tara Touzie, born in 1989.

== See also ==
- List of actors with Academy Award nominations
- List of Iranian actresses
- List of Iranian women
