= Ali Nassirian =

Iranian actor (born 1935)

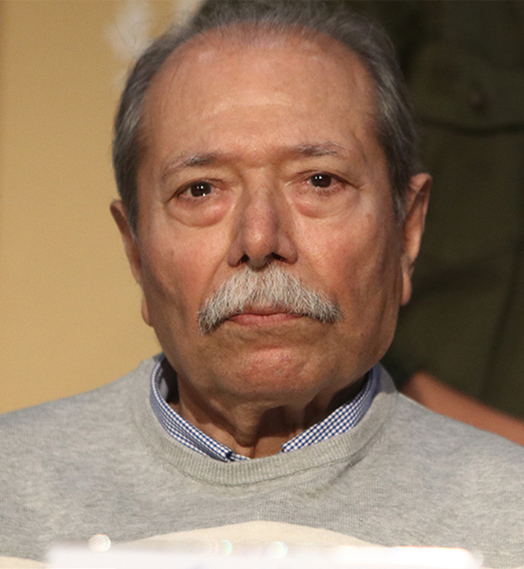
- Nassirian at the 2020 Fajr Film Festival
- Born: 4 February 1935 (age 91); Tehran, Iran
- Occupations: Actor, film director
- Years active: 1947–present
- Spouse: Fatemeh Bayat (m. 1969; died 2019)
- Awards: Order of Culture and Art (1st Class)

Ali Nassirian (Persian: علی نصیریان; born February 4, 1935) is an Iranian actor. He has received various accolades, including two Crystal Simorghs, a Hafez Award, an Iran's Film Critics and Writers Association Award and a Sepas Award. Nasirian, Mohammad Ali Keshavarz, Ezatollah Entezami, Jamshid Mashayekhi and Davoud Rashidi are known as "the five most important actors in the history of Iranian cinema" because of their influence.

== Film career ==
He first appeared in a supporting role in Dariush Mehrjui's The Cow (1969) alongside Ezatollah Entezami. Nassirian then played the title role of Mr. Naive (1970), also by Mehrjui. His other films include: The Postman (1971), The Cycle (1974), The Mandrake (1975), Kamalolmolk (1983), Mirza Norouz's Shoes (1985), Stone Lion (1986), Captain Khorshid (1987), The Scent of Joseph's Shirt (1995), and Iron Island (2005), Masxarebaz (2019) for which he received the Crystal Simorgh award for the best supporting actor. He played the lead role in The Saturday Hunter (2011), and Sun Children (2020).

== Filmography ==
=== Film ===
| Year | Title | Role | Director | Notes |
|---|---|---|---|---|
| 1969 | The Cow | Mash Eslam | Dariush Mehrjui | |
| 1970 | Mr. Naive | Mr. Halou | Dariush Mehrjui | |
| 1972 | Sattar Khan | Sattar Khan | Ali Hatami | |
| 1972 | The Postman | Taghi Postchi | Dariush Mehrjui | |
| 1975 | The Mandrake | Ali EzatFakhar | Fereydoun Gole | |
| 1976 | The Custodian | Rahman Najafi | Khosrow Haritash | |
| 1977 | The Cycle | Esmail | Dariush Mehrjui | |
| 1981 | The School We Used to Go | Amir Pazouki | Dariush Mehrjui | |
| 1987 | Captain Khorshid | Mr. Farhan | Nasser Taghvai | |
| 1987 | The Stone Lion | A'ali Yar | Masoud Jafari Jozani | |
| 1989 | The Years of Ash | | Mehdi Sabaghzadeh | |
| 1989 | The Grand Day | | Kianoush Ayari | |
| 1990 | Foreign Currency | Morteza Olfat | Rakhshan Banietemad | |
| 1995 | The Scent of Joseph's Shirt | Daei Ghafoor | Ebrahim Hatamikia | |
| 1997 | Minoo Watch Tower | | Ebrahim Hatamikia | |
| 1999 | Punishment Committe | Abolfath Mirza | Ali Hatami | |
| 2001 | Prisoner 707 | | Habibollah Bahmani | |
| 2003 | One Flew Over the Cuckoo's Nest | Ferasat | Ahmad Reza Motamedi | |
| 2003 | The Silent King | | Homayoun Shahnavaz | |
| 2005 | Iron Island | Solatol Doleh | Mohammad Rasoulof | |
| 2009 | The Postman Doesn't Knock Three Times | | Hassan Fathi | |
| 2010 | The Saturday Hunter | Grandfather | Parviz Sheikh Tadi | |
| 2015 | Iran Burger | Amrollah Khan | Masoud Jafari Jozani | |
| 2018 | Emperor of Hell | | Parviz Sheikh Tadi | |
| 2018 | Tale of the Sea | Houshang | Bahman Farmanara | |
| 2019 | A Hairy Tale | Kazem | Homayoun Ghanizadeh | |
| 2020 | Sun Children | Hashem | Majid Majidi | |
| 2022 | A Minor | Aghajoon | Dariush Mehrjui | |
| 2023 | Seven Citrus Aurantium | Shams | Farshad Golsefidi | |
| 2024 | Nowruz | | Soheil Movaffagh | |
| 2025 | Oh, What Happy Days! | | Homayoun Ghanizadeh | |

=== Television ===
| Year | Title | Role | Director | Platform | Notes |
|---|---|---|---|---|---|
| 2015–2016 | Shahrzad | Bozorg Agha | Hassan Fathi | Lotus Play | Main role; season 1 |
| 2021 | Mutual Friendship | Himself | Shahab Hosseini | Namava | Talk show; 1 episode; with Dariush Moadabian & Farhad A'ish |

=== Television ===
| Year | Title | Role | Director | Network | Notes |
|---|---|---|---|---|---|
| 1983–1984 | Sarbadars | Judge Share' | Mohammad Ali Najafi | IRIB TV1 | TV series; main role |
| 1988 | Nightingales | Abolfath Sabah | Ali Hatami | IRIB TV1 | TV series; main role |
| 2007 | The Forbidden Fruit | Younes Fotouhi | Hassan Fathi | IRIB TV2 | TV series; main role |
| 2019 | Dear Brother | Karim Boustan | Mohammad Reza Ahanj | IRIB TV3 | TV series; main role |

== Plays ==
- 2012: The Actor and His Wife, Niavaran Cultural Center, writer and actor, direct by Mohsen Moeini Negin Mirhasani Vahed
- 2012: Dozing-off Niavaran Cultural Center, writer and actor, direct by Mohsen Moeini
