= The Patriot (1953 film) =

- Directed by: Gholam-Hossein Naghshineh
- Written by: Mohammad Deram-Bakhsh
- Starring: Taghi Zohouri; Gholam-Hossein Naghshineh; Hamideh Kheirabadi
- Production company: Shahriar Film
- Release date: 21 June 1953
- Running time: 100 minutes
- Country: Iran
- Language: Persian

The Patriot (Persian: Mihan-parast) is a 1953 Iranian drama film directed by Gholam-Hossein Naghshineh.

== Cast ==
- Ali Tabesh
- Taghi Zohouri
- Hamideh Kheirabadi
- Gholam-Hossein Naghshineh
- Mohammad Reza Zandi
- Hossein Mohseni

== Bibliography ==
- Mohammad Ali Issari. Cinema in Iran, 1900-1979. Scarecrow Press, 1989.
