= On the Fast Horse =

2014 Iranian play by Mohsen Moeini

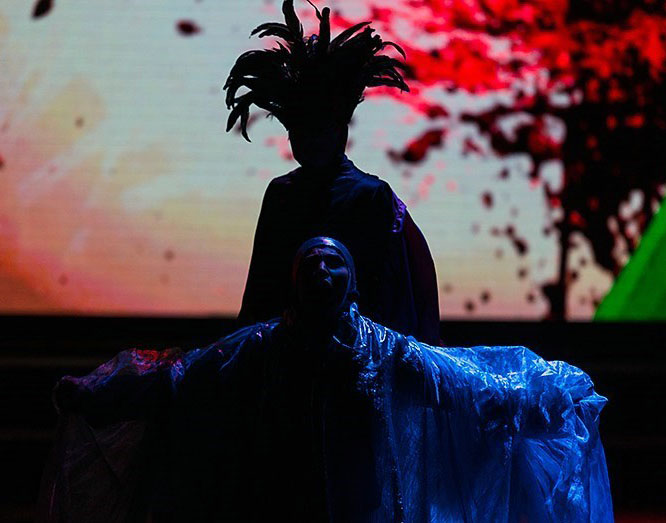
- Original language: Persian
- Written by: Mohsen Moeini

Premiere
- Date: Autumn 2014
- Place: City Theater of Tehran; Tehran, Iran
- Directed by: Mohsen Moeini

On the Fast Horse is a play written and directed by Mohsen Moeini and produced by Negin Mirhasani Vahed. It went on stage in Milad Tower, Iran in 2014 and was the first play to be staged there. One of the distinguishing features of the play is the utilization of novel visual techniques, which were used for the first time in Iranian theater. It is adapted from Ganjīnat al-asrār by Amman Samani.

== Cast ==
- Mehdi Faghih
- Changiz Jalilvand
- Pardis Afkari

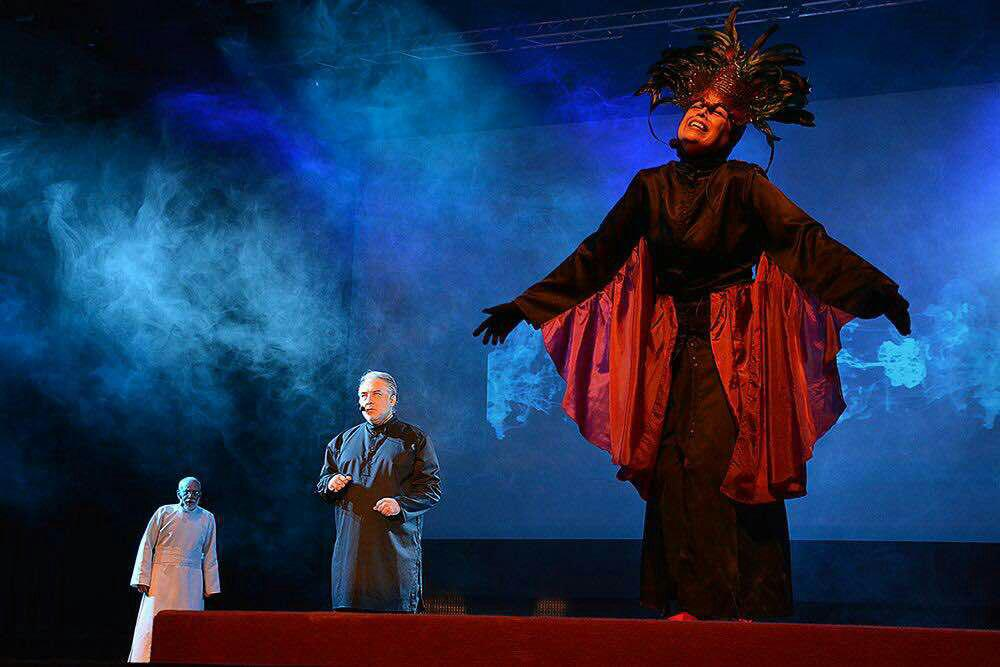
The Fast Horse

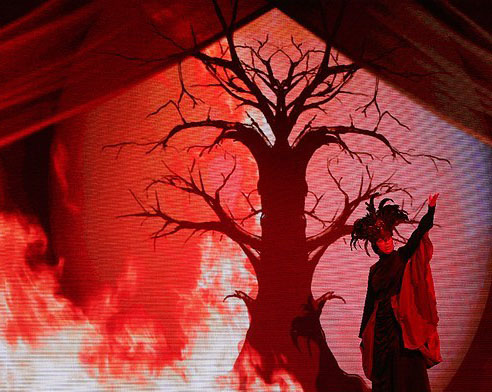
The Fast Horse 2014

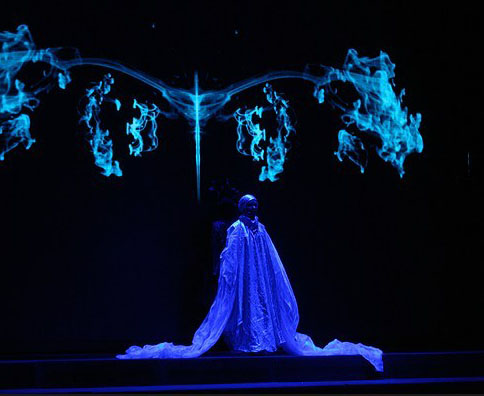
On the Fast Horse
