= Changiz Jalilvand =

Iranian voice actor (1940–2020)

- چنگیز جلیلوند
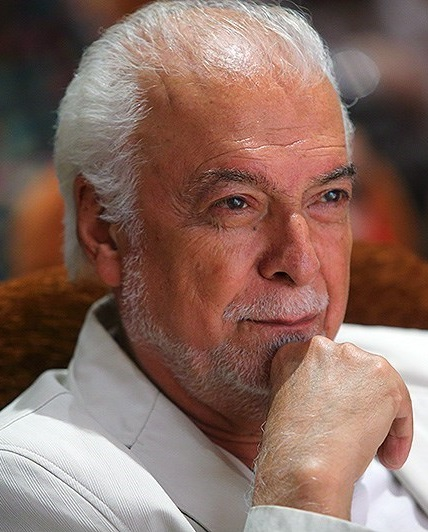
- Jalilvand in 2013
- Born: 28 October 1935; Shiraz, Fars, Iran
- Died: 22 November 2020 (aged 85); Tehran, Iran
- Occupation: Voice actor
- Years active: 1957–1978; 1998–2020

Changiz Jalilvand (28 October 1935 (Note: The year 1935 is the registered birth year on Changiz Jalilvand's identity document, which conflicts with two different years mentioned by Jalilvand himself. In an exclusive interview with the Iran Cinema Museum (oral history), he stated his birth year as 1938, and on the Dorehami program, he mentioned 1940. However, his tombstone records his birth year as 1935.) – 22 November 2020) was an Iranian voice actor, dubbing director, and actor.

Jalilvand began his career in 1957, working at the 21st Century Studio, other studios, and the IRIB dubbing studio. He died on November 22, 2020, due to COVID-19.

== Biography ==
Changiz Jalilvand was born on October 28, 1935, in Shiraz. He began his artistic career in 1957 with theatre alongside Abolhassan Tahami.

After the 1979 Iranian Revolution, Changiz Jalilvand lived in the United States for twenty years. He returned to Iran and resumed dubbing in 1998. He also acted in several television series and films.

Jalilvand's voice was ideal for dubbing commanding and impactful leading roles in cinema. He was skilled in voice characterization and could produce a variety of voices. Among Iranian voice actors, he was known as the "Man with the Golden Throat" and "Mr. Dubbing of Iran".

In 1978, Changiz Jalilvand was recognized as an exemplary global voice actor. He dubbed for numerous prominent foreign and domestic actors. He was the primary voice for Marlon Brando's roles, known for his creative voice characterizations.

Jalilvand's most famous dubbing roles in foreign films were for Marlon Brando, Robert De Niro, Salman Khan, Paul Newman, Burt Lancaster, Maximilian Schell, Richard Burton, Peter O'Toole, Yul Brynner, Clint Eastwood, Dean Martin, Sylvester Stallone, Liam Neeson, Kenneth Branagh, Robert Downey Jr. and in Iranian films for Mohammad Ali Fardin, Behrouz Vossoughi, Naser Malek Motiei, Iraj Ghaderi, and Saeed Rad.

== Death ==
Changiz Jalilvand died on November 22, 2020, due to COVID-19 at Khatam-ol-Anbia Hospital in Tehran. His body was laid to rest on November 25, 2020, in the Artists' Section of Behesht-e Zahra.

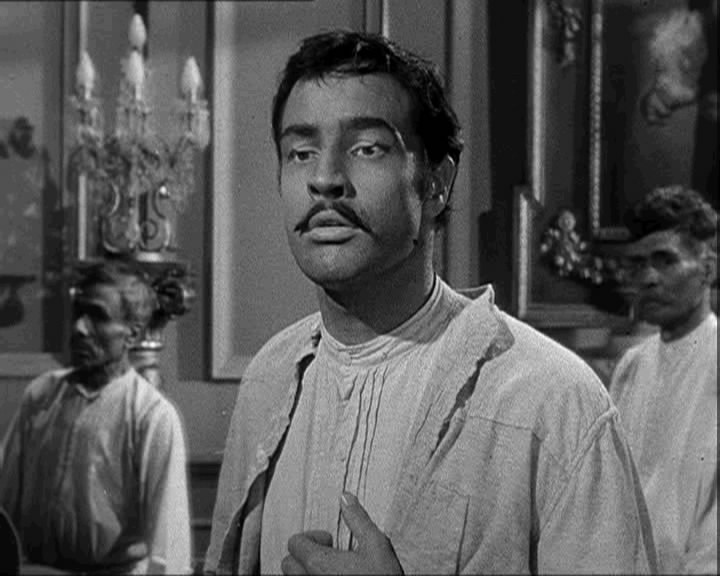
Viva Zapata! – Marlon Brando – One of Changiz Jalilvand's notable works

== Voice acting ==
=== Domestic actors ===
- Fardin in films such as Ganj-e Qarun, Wheel of Fate, Baba Shamal, Young Man, Alley of Men, Soltane Ghalbha, Mr. 20th Century, Golden Palace, Hatem Tai, Pretty Pretty, Lucky Coin.
- Behrouz Vossoughi in films The Hive, Mamal the American, Honeymoon, Dagger, Zabih, Idol, Touqi, Breathless, Companion.
- Naser Malek Motiei in films Gholam the Gendarme, Man, Captain, Baba Shamal, Wood Pigeon, Chandelier, Idol, Baba Goli Be Jamalat, Noon Prayer, Knucklebones, Golden Heel, Silver Hot.
- Iraj Ghaderi in films Fratricide, Death Sentence, Panther at Night, Doctor and Dancer, Back and Dagger, Artery, Cage, Rebel, Uncle Footballer, Southern Shark, Lust, Turkmen, Unveiled, Target, Captain with God, Two Stubborn Ones.
- Saeed Rad in film Journey of the Stone.
- Jamshid Mashayekhi in film The Heartbroken.
- Mohammad Reza Golzar in film Salaam Mumbai.
- Hamed Behdad in film Crime by Masoud Kimiai.
- Arash Majidi in television series on IRIB TV1 Jalaluddin.
- Bahman Mofid in films Stranger, Heydar, Sorceress, Rashid.

=== Foreign characters ===
Foreign Films and Series
Role	Actor	Film or Series Title	Notes
Daryl Dixon	Norman Reedus	The Walking Dead	
Emiliano Zapata	Marlon Brando	Viva Zapata!	1952, directed by Elia Kazan; First dubbing in 1961, managed by Ataollah Kameli at Misaghieh Studio – Second dubbing in 1976, managed by himself
Stanley	Marlon Brando	A Streetcar Named Desire	1951
Napoleon Bonaparte	Marlon Brando	Désirée	1954
Terry Malloy	Marlon Brando	On the Waterfront	Directed by Elia Kazan
Sir William Walker	Marlon Brando	Burn!	1969
Johnny	Marlon Brando	The Wild One	1953
Ogden	Marlon Brando	A Countess from Hong Kong	1967, directed by Charlie Chaplin
Victor Novak	Gérard Klein	The Teacher	1993–2005, France and Switzerland production. The only foreign series Changiz Jalilvand dubbed after the Revolution at IRIB's dubbing unit.
Lloyd	Marlon Brando	Sayonara	1957
Sinbad	Brad Pitt	Sinbad: Legend of the Seven Seas	2003
Beast	Robby Benson	Beauty and the Beast	1991
Robert Lee Clayton/Tom	Marlon Brando; Jack Nicholson	The Missouri Breaks	1976
Peter	Marlon Brando	The Nightcomers	
Miles Hendon	Errol Flynn	The Prince and the Pauper	1937
Jesus Christ	Jeffrey Hunter	King of Kings	1961
Brick	Paul Newman	Cat on a Hot Tin Roof	Third dubbing (directed by Khosrow Khosrowshahi)
Eddie	Paul Newman	The Hustler	1961
Guy	Clark Gable	The Misfits	1961
Rupert	James Stewart	Rope	Directed by Alfred Hitchcock
Stevens	Terence Hill	God Forgives… I Don't!	1967
Cole Thornton	John Wayne	El Dorado	1966
Robert Stroud	Burt Lancaster	Birdman of Alcatraz	First dubbing
Roger	Cary Grant	North by Northwest	Directed by Alfred Hitchcock, second dubbing
Don Fabrizio	Burt Lancaster	The Leopard	1963, directed by Luchino Visconti
Solomon	Yul Brynner	Solomon and Sheba	1959, first dubbing
Zorba	Anthony Quinn	Zorba the Greek	1964
Colonel Pierre Raspeguy	Anthony Quinn	Lost Command	1966
King Henry II	Peter O'Toole	The Lion in Winter	Dubbing directed by Abolhassan Tahami
John Smith	Richard Burton	Where Eagles Dare	
Indiana Jones	Harrison Ford	Indiana Jones	Indiana Jones film series
Robin Hood	Kevin Costner	Robin Hood: Prince of Thieves	1991
William (Will)	Clint Eastwood	Unforgiven	1992
Prot	Kevin Spacey	K-PAX	2001
Detective Mitch	Robert De Niro	Showtime	2002
Dr. King Schultz	Christoph Waltz	Django Unchained	2012
Kai	Keanu Reeves	47 Ronin	2013
Pope Silva	Robert De Niro	Heist	2015
Bryan	Liam Neeson	Taken 3	2015
Bernie Madoff	Robert De Niro	The Wizard of Lies	2017
Hercule Poirot	Kenneth Branagh	Murder on the Orient Express	2017
Iron Man	Robert Downey Jr.	Avengers: Endgame	Avengers and Iron Man film series
Murray Franklin	Robert De Niro	Joker	2019
King Ecbert / King of Wessex	Linus Roache	Series: Vikings	2013
Tony Lip	Viggo Mortensen	Green Book	2018
Nobody	Terence Hill	My Name Is Nobody	First dubbing
Joe Erin	Burt Lancaster	Vera Cruz	Second dubbing, directed by himself
Serge Miller	Anthony Quinn	The Visit	1964
Colonel Ben Allison	Clark Gable	The Tall Men	1955
Colonel Alan Faulkner	Richard Burton	The Wild Geese	1978, first dubbing; directed by himself
Ivanhoe	Robert Taylor	Ivanhoe	1952 First dubbing: 1961, directed by Ahmad Rasoulzadeh, Damavand Studio Second dubbing: 1976, directed by Khosrow Khosrowshahi, Rama Studio
Khalil Abdul-Mohsen	Sean Connery	The Next Man	1976
	Mohammad Ali Fardin	The Man with a Thousand Smiles	1971

=== Foreign actors ===
For	In Film(s)
Paul Newman	Somebody Up There Likes Me, Cat on a Hot Tin Roof, Victory, The Long, Hot Summer, Cool Hand Luke, The Life and Times of Judge Roy Bean, The Secret War of Harry Frigg, The Sting, Sweet Bird of Youth, The MacKintosh Man, The Hudsucker Proxy, The Hustler, The Left Handed Gun, The Towering Inferno, Torn Curtain, Butch Cassidy and the Sundance Kid
Marlon Brando	The Wild One, Viva Zapata!, A Streetcar Named Desire, On the Waterfront, The Young Lions, Sayonara, The Nightcomers, A Countess from Hong Kong, One-Eyed Jacks, The Chase, Burn!, The Missouri Breaks
Richard Burton	Cleopatra, Where Eagles Dare, Doctor Faustus, Who's Afraid of Virginia Woolf?, The Taming of the Shrew, Hammersmith Is Out, The Medusa Touch, Hotel International, The Wild Geese, The Desert Rats, Raid on Rommel, The Assassination of Trotsky
Bruce Lee	The Big Boss, Game of Death, Game of Death II
Ed Harris	The Third Miracle, The Hours
Timothy Dalton	The Living Daylights, Licence to Kill
Terence Hill	My Name Is Nobody, God Forgives... I Don't!, The Wind's Fierce, Doc West
Daniel Craig	Skyfall, Dream House, Logan Lucky
Errol Flynn	The Prince and the Pauper
Raf Vallone	Two Women
Dwayne Johnson	Empire State, Race to Witch Mountain, Fast & Furious Presents: Hobbs & Shaw, Jumanji: The Next Level, San Andreas
Dharmendra	Sholay, Chupke Chupke
Salman Khan	Yuvvraaj, Judwaa, Hum Aapke Hain Koun..!, Jai Ho, Judwaa, Babul, Bodyguard, Ready, Salaam-e-Ishq, Pyaar Kiya To Darna Kya, Wanted, Hum Dil De Chuke Sanam, Jab Pyaar Kisise Hota Hai, Kuch Kuch Hota Hai, Tiger Zinda Hai, Sultan
Ajay Devgn	Son of Sardaar, Action Jackson, Singham Returns, Golmaal, Bol Bachchan
Liam Neeson	Taken 3, Unknown, The Commuter, Wrath of the Titans
Michael Caine	The Dark Knight Rises, Journey 2: The Mysterious Island
Matt Dillon	Albino Alligator
Steve Reeves	The Avenger, The Pirates of Malaysia
Kurt Russell	Escape from New York, Tombstone
Howard Keel	Seven Brides for Seven Brothers
Dick Van Dyke	Mary Poppins, Chitty Chitty Bang Bang
Sylvester Stallone	The Expendables, The Expendables 2, The Expendables 3, Rocky, Rocky II, Rocky III, Rocky IV, Rocky V, Rocky Balboa, Creed, Oscar, Get Carter, Assassins, Daylight, Rambo II, Rambo III, Rambo IV, Rambo V, Escape Plan 2: Hades, Demolition Man
Bud Spencer	It Can Be Done Amigo
Kevin Costner	Robin Hood, Draft Day
Amitabh Bachchan	Zanjeer
Victor Mature	Hannibal
Vin Diesel	Find Me Guilty, Riddick, The Fate of the Furious
Hugh Jackman	The Wolverine, Real Steel, Kate & Leopold, Logan, Eddie the Eagle, Van Helsing, Les Misérables, Chappie, X-Men
Kevin Spacey	K-PAX, Recount, Beyond the Sea, The Usual Suspects
Andy Garcia	Christmas in Conway
Burt Lancaster	Seven Days in May, Brute Force, The Leopard, Vera Cruz, Elmer Gantry, Trapeze, Gunfight at the O.K. Corral, Birdman of Alcatraz, From Here to Eternity, The Devil's Disciple, The Young Savages, The Unforgiven, Judgment at Nuremberg, The Professionals, The Scalphunters, The Cassandra Crossing, Island of Dr. Moreau
Sean Connery	Just Cause, Dr. No, Goldfinger, Thunderball, Never Say Never Again, Diamonds Are Forever, You Only Live Twice, From Russia with Love, The Rock, The League of Extraordinary Gentlemen, Darby O'Gill and the Little People, Indiana Jones and the Last Crusade, Highlander
Woody Harrelson	Zombieland, Zombieland: Double Tap, True Detective (season 1), War for the Planet of the Apes, Three Billboards Outside Ebbing, Missouri, Solo: A Star Wars Story, Highwaymen
Bryan Cranston	Godzilla, The One and Only Ivan, Kung Fu Panda 3
Robert Downey Jr.	The Avengers, Avengers: Age of Ultron, Sherlock Holmes, Sherlock Holmes: A Game of Shadows, Captain America: Civil War, Spider-Man: Homecoming, Avengers: Infinity War, Iron Man, Iron Man 2, Iron Man 3, Avengers: Endgame, Dolittle, The Judge
Ralph Fiennes	The Grand Budapest Hotel, Harry Potter and the Goblet of Fire, Harry Potter and the Order of the Phoenix, Harry Potter and the Deathly Hallows – Part 1, Harry Potter and the Deathly Hallows – Part 2
Billy Zane	Titanic
Joseph Fiennes	Elizabeth
Jim Carrey	Ace Ventura: Pet Detective, Ace Ventura: When Nature Calls, Mr. Popper's Penguins, The Mask
Chris Evans	Cellular
Harrison Ford	Indiana Jones and the Temple of Doom, Raiders of the Lost Ark, Indiana Jones and the Last Crusade, Indiana Jones and the Kingdom of the Crystal Skull, Star Wars: The Force Awakens, Blade Runner, Firewall, The Fugitive, Blade Runner 2049, The Call of the Wild
Jude Law	The Talented Mr. Ripley
Denzel Washington	He Got Game, The Equalizer, Unstoppable, The Equalizer 2
Keanu Reeves	47 Ronin
George Clooney	Confessions of a Dangerous Mind, Intolerable Cruelty
Bruce Willis	Die Hard, Die Hard 2, Die Hard with a Vengeance, Live Free or Die Hard, A Good Day to Die Hard, The Jackal, Pulp Fiction, The Kid, Catch .44, Fire with Fire, Cop Out, Looper, Glass
Ben Affleck	Good Will Hunting, Daredevil, Boiler Room, Batman v Superman: Dawn of Justice, Justice League
Mel Gibson	Lethal Weapon, Lethal Weapon 2, Lethal Weapon 3, Lethal Weapon 4, The Expendables 3, Get the Gringo
Michael Douglas	Wonder Boys, Ant-Man
Rowan Atkinson	Johnny English, Johnny English Reborn, Johnny English Strikes Again
James Caan	The Godfather, Misery
Gregory Peck	Big Country, The Guns of Navarone, Mackenna's Gold, Midnight Duel
Robert De Niro	Heist, Wag the Dog, The Killing Season, Once Upon a Time in America, The Irishman, Goodfellas, Joker, The War with Grandpa
Clark Gable	Gone with the Wind, The Misfits, It Happened One Night, Band of Angels
Colin Firth	Kingsman: The Secret Service, The Railway Man
Christian Bale	Terminator Salvation, The Jungle Book
Kenneth Branagh	Hamlet, Dunkirk, Murder on the Orient Express
Hrithik Roshan	Kabhi Khushi Kabhie Gham, Lakshya, Krrish, Krrish 3, Koi... Mil Gaya, Dhoom 2
Sunny Deol	Apne, Right Yaaa Wrong, Singh Saab the Great
Anthony Steffen	Django Strikes Again
Yul Brynner	The Magnificent Seven, Solomon and Sheba, The Ten Commandments, Travel, Invitation to a Gunfighter, Morituri, The Ultimate Warrior, Poppies Are Also Flowers
Stephen Boyd	Ben-Hur, Poppies Are Also Flowers
Roy Scheider	Jaws
Kirk Douglas	The Vikings, The War Wagon, Along the Great Divide, Two-Fisted Tales, Oscar
Roger Moore	Octopussy, A View to a Kill
Clint Eastwood	The Outlaw Josey Wales, Magnum Force, A Fistful of Dollars, Two Mules for Sister Sara, The Good, the Bad and the Ugly, Dirty Harry, The Eiger Sanction, Coogan's Bluff, The Rookie, Unforgiven
Lee Van Cleef	Sabata
Charlton Heston	Touch of Evil, 55 Days at Peking
John Wayne	The Quiet Man, El Dorado
Peter O'Toole	Lawrence of Arabia, Becket, What's New Pussycat?, The Last Emperor, Troy, How to Steal a Million
Russell Crowe	Gladiator, 3:10 to Yuma, Noah
Jeremy Irons	House of the Spirits, Batman v Superman: Dawn of Justice
Geoffrey Rush	The Life and Death of Peter Sellers
Jeff Bridges	Tron, The Big Lebowski
Vincent Cassel	Secret Agents
Robert Redford	The Great Gatsby, Sneakers
James Stewart	Rope
Steve McQueen	The Great Escape, The Cincinnati Kid
Jean-Paul Belmondo	Le Doulos
Antonio Banderas	House of the Spirits, The Expendables 3
Michael Fassbender	X-Men: First Class, Prometheus, Alien: Covenant
Richard Armitage	The Hobbit: An Unexpected Journey The Hobbit: The Desolation of Smaug The Hobbit: The Battle of the Five Armies
Laurence Fishburne	The Matrix, The Matrix Reloaded, The Matrix Revolutions
Jim Gaffigan	Hotel Transylvania 3
Christoph Waltz	Inglourious Basterds – Django Unchained
Arnold Schwarzenegger	Viy 2: Journey to China, Terminator: Dark Fate
Jason Statham	13
James Purefoy	Solomon Kane

== Acting ==
=== Cinema ===
- Mr. Luck (1959)
- Arshin Malalan (1960)
- The Neighbor's Daughter (1961)
- Harbor of Love (1967)
- Fitileh and Mah Pishooni (2011)
- Collars of Gold (2011)
- My Father's Love Story (2012)
- This Apple Is for You (2014)
- West Terminal (2016)

=== Television ===
- Salman Farsi
- Monster, Iranian series directed by Mehran Modiri
- Crossing Autumn
- Yalda
- Nushdaru
- Star Twenty Competition (Judge)
- Magic of Voice (Judge)
- The Enigma of the Shah
- The Art of Dubbing

=== Theatre ===
- On the Swift Steed, theatre voice acting, Milad Tower Tehran, directed by Mohsen Moeini 2013
- Father, actor, Shahrzad Theatre Complex, directed by Mahmoud Zendehnam 2016

== Genealogical Chart ==
- Eisa Jalilvand
  - Changiz Jalilvand (1935–2020) ⚭ Pourandokht Ateshrang (1936–)
    - Niloofar Jalilvand (1962–) ⚭ Jeffrey Stowe (1964–)
      - Leila Nations (1983–)
      - Cyrus Stowe (1996–)
    - Frankie Fariba Jalilvand (1963–) ⚭ Bijan Khossrovpour (1958–)
      - Donya Khossrovpour (1992–)
    - Khashayar Nickolas Jalilvand (1969–) ⚭ Shahdi Jalilvand (1967–)
      - Sophia Petra Jalilvand (2001–)
      - Kourosh Nickolas Jalilvand (2005–)

== Sources ==
- "I Can Still Speak for 25-Year-Olds", Radio Zamaneh, 1 May 2009
- Shafaf Website: Jalilvand's Memories.
- "From Dubbing to Acting". YJC (in Persian). 2013-05-21.
- Changiz Jalilvand at the Media Academy – Archived version 29-07-2017.
