= Negin Mirhasani Vahed =

Iranian theatrical manager and producer

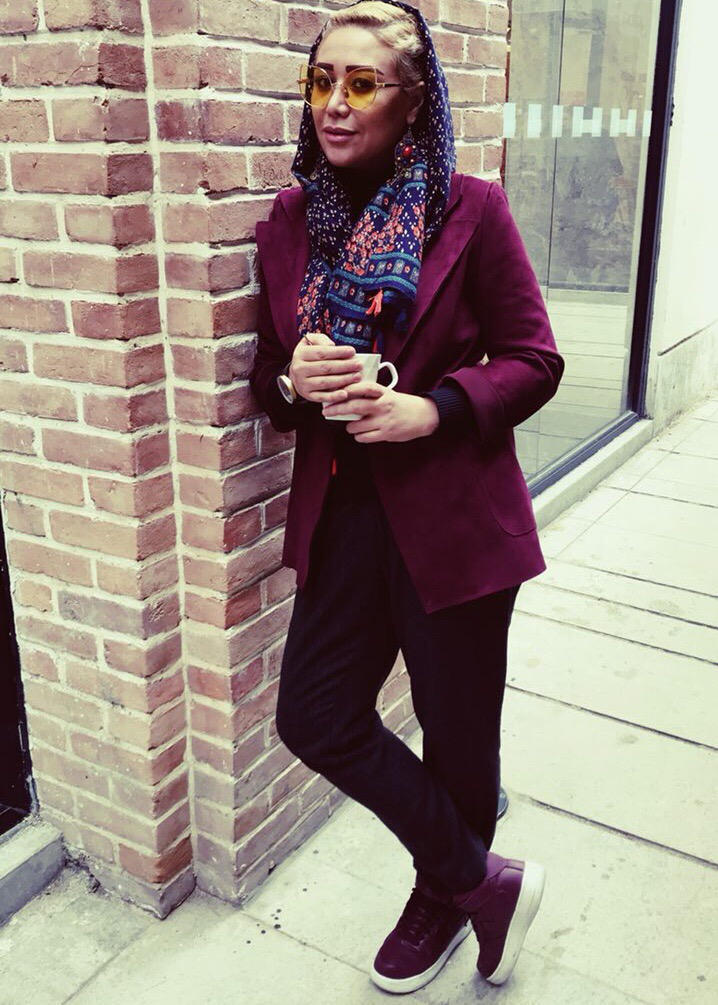
- Born: Tehran, Iran
- Occupations: Theater producer, costume designer, Film director
- Years active: 1999–present

Negin Mirhasani Vahed is an Iranian artist manager, producer and costume designer and the first female theater producer in Iran. She has also been responsible for the costume design of a variety of plays and television series.

== Work ==
=== TV series ===
- 2016 Heights Underneath, producer, Director: Mohsen Moeini, seven-episode teleplay, channel 4
- 2014 Utrush, costume designer, 13-episode teleplay, Director: Mohsen Moeini

=== Plays ===
- 2011 Tenth Mind, (producer and costume designer), Nazerzadeh Hall, Iranshahr theater
- 2012 The Actor and His Wife, (producer and costume designer), starring Ali Nassirian and Mahboobeh Bayat, Niavaran Cultural Center
- 2012 Dozing-off, (producer and costume designer), starring Ali Nassirian and Mahboobeh Bayat, Niavaran Cultural Center
- 2013 Turandot, (producer and costume designer), adapted from Puccini’s opera and Nezami’s story, Niavaran Cultural Center
- 2014 On the Fast Horse, (producer and costume designer), Milad Tower, Tehran
- 2014 A Thousand Mirrors, (producer and costume designer), Milad Tower, Tehran
- 2015 The Chant of Gabriel's Wing, (producer and costume designer), Andisheh Hall
- 2015 Kaspar, (producer and costume designer), a play by Peter Handke, Av theater (Da)
- 2016 Lion in Chains, (producer and costume designer), Andisheh Hall
- 2017 Blood on the Cat's Neck, (producer and costume designer), Baran theater

== See also ==
- Cinema of Iran
- Iranian modern and contemporary art
- Persian theatre
