= To Have and Have Not =

1937 novel by Ernest Hemingway

- First edition cover
- Author: Ernest Hemingway
- Language: English
- Genre: Fiction
- Publisher: Charles Scribner's Sons
- Publication date: 1937
- Publication place: United States

To Have and Have Not is a novel by Ernest Hemingway published in 1937 by Charles Scribner's Sons. The book follows Harry Morgan, a fishing boat captain out of Key West, Florida. To Have and Have Not was Hemingway's fourth novel, and second set in the United States, after The Torrents of Spring.

Written sporadically between 1935 and 1937, and revised as he traveled back and forth from Spain during the Spanish Civil War, the novel portrays Key West and Cuba in the 1930s, and provides a social commentary on that time and place. Hemingway biographer Jeffrey Meyers described the novel as heavily influenced by the Marxist ideology Hemingway was exposed to by his support of the Republican faction in the Spanish Civil War while he was writing it. The work got a mixed critical reception.

The novel had its origins in two short stories published earlier in periodicals by Hemingway ("One Trip Across" and "The Tradesman's Return") which make up the opening chapters, and a novella, written later, which makes up about two-thirds of the book. The narrative is told from multiple viewpoints, at different times, by different characters, and the characters' names are frequently supplied under the chapter headings to indicate who is narrating that chapter.

== Summary ==
Harry is an ordinary working man of the Depression Era, forced by dire economic forces into the black-market activity of running contraband between Cuba and Florida. A wealthy fishing charter customer (one of the "Haves") bilks Harry by slipping away without paying after a three-week fishing trip, leaving Harry destitute. Stuck in Havana and motivated by the need to support his family, Harry then himself turns to crime. He makes a fateful decision to swindle would-be Chinese immigrants seeking passage into Florida from Cuba. Instead of transporting them as agreed, he murders the Chinese middle-man and puts the men ashore in Cuba. Harry begins to ferry different types of illegal cargo between the two countries, including alcohol and Cuban revolutionaries. These events alternate with chapters that describe the dissolute lives of wealthy yacht owners. The Great Depression features prominently in the novel, forcing depravity and hunger on the poor residents of Key West (the "Have Nots") who are referred to locally as "Conchs".

== Background and publication history ==
To Have and Have Not began as a short story—published as "One Trip Across" in Cosmopolitan in 1934—introducing the character of Harry Morgan. A second story was written and published in Esquire in 1936, at which point Hemingway decided to write a novel about Harry Morgan. However, the outbreak of the Spanish Civil War delayed his work on it.

To Have and Have Not was published by Scribner's on 15 October 1937 to a first edition print-run of approximately 10,000 copies. Cosmopolitan published a section of the novel as "One Trip Across" in 1934; Esquire published a section as "The Tradesman's Return" in 1936. It was also published as an Armed Services Edition during WWII.

== Film adaptations ==
The novel was adapted into a 1944 film starring Humphrey Bogart and Lauren Bacall. The film, with screenplay by Jules Furthman and William Faulkner, and directed by Howard Hawks, changed the story's setting from Key West to Martinique under the Vichy regime, and made significant alterations to the plot, including removing themes involving economic inequality and class conflict, and turning the story into a romantic thriller centering on the sparks between Harry Morgan and Marie Browning.

The second film version, titled The Breaking Point (1950), was directed by Michael Curtiz and stars John Garfield and Patricia Neal with Juano Hernandez as Morgan's partner. The movie shifted the action to southern California and made Garfield a former PT Boat captain but is otherwise the most faithful to the original book.

The third film version, titled The Gun Runners (1958), was directed by Don Siegel and stars Audie Murphy as the boat captain, with Everett Sloane as the alcoholic sidekick.

In 1987 the Iranian director Nasser Taghvai adapted the novel into a localized version called Captain Khorshid which took the events from Cuba to the shores of the Persian Gulf.

An episode of the television show Cheyenne titled "Fury at Rio Hondo" is a Western adaptation of the story set in Mexico, with a screenplay by William Faulkner and James Gunn.

== General references ==
- Baker, Carlos (1972). Hemingway: The Writer as Artist (4th ed.). Princeton University Press. ISBN 0-691-01305-5.
- Mellow, James R. (1992). Hemingway: A Life Without Consequences. New York: Houghton Mifflin. ISBN 0-395-37777-3.
- Meyers, Jeffrey (1985). Hemingway: A Biography. London: Macmillan. ISBN 0-333-42126-4.
- Oliver, Charles M. (1999). Ernest Hemingway A to Z: The Essential Reference to the Life and Work. New York: Checkmark. ISBN 0-8160-3467-2.
