= The Actor and His Wife =

2012 play

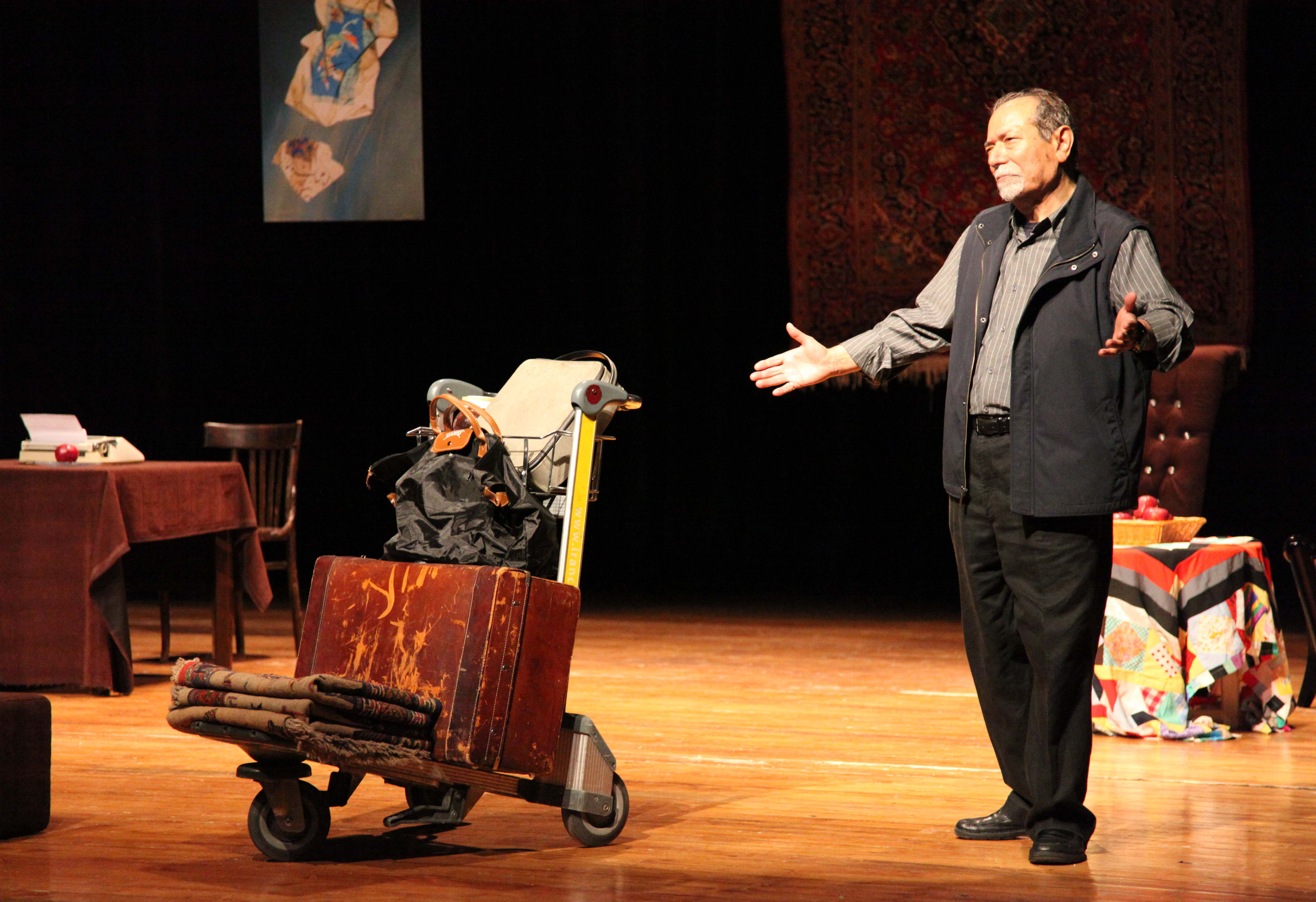
- Original language: Persian
- Written by: Ali Nassirian
- Music by: Ali Ghamsari

Premiere
- Date: Autumn 2012
- Place: City Theater of Tehran; Tehran, Iran
- Directed by: Mohsen Moeini

The Actor and His Wife is a play directed by Mohsen Moeini and produced by Negin Mirhasani Vahed, starring Ali Nassirian and Mahboobeh Bayat. It went on stage in 2012 in Niavaran Cultural Center, Iran. This play is written by Ali Nassirian and depicts the relationship between an actor and his wife on an obligatory journey. The music was composed by Ali Ghamsari. The play ran for two months in Autumn 2012.

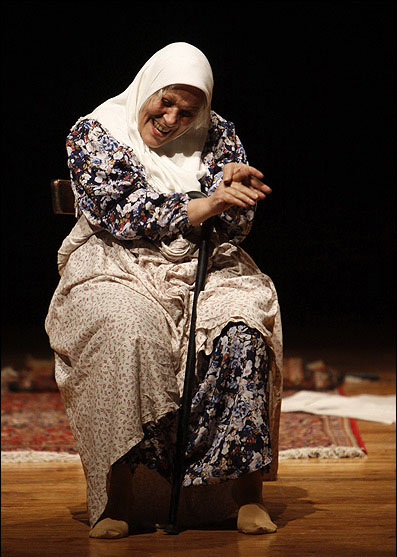
The Actor and His Wife
