= Captain Khorshid =

- Directed by: Nasser Taghvai
- Written by: Nasser Taghvai
- Produced by: Mohammad Ali Soltanzadeh
- Starring: Dariush Arjmand; Ali Nassirian; Parvaneh Masoumi; Fathali Oveisi
- Cinematography: Mehrdad Fakhimi
- Edited by: Nasser Taghvai
- Release date: 1987
- Running time: 1 hour 49 minutes
- Country: Iran
- Language: Persian

Captain Khorshid (Persian: ناخدا خورشید, romanized: Nakhoda Khorshid) is a 1987 Iranian film written and directed by Nasser Taghvai. It is based on Ernest Hemingway's 1937 novel To Have and Have Not, but it moves the setting from Cuba to the south of Iran and the shores of the Persian Gulf. All the events of the film are nationalized.

It is considered one of the greatest Iranian films by critics.

== Plot ==
Captain Khorshid is a sailor who although only having one hand, manages to sail his little boat. In his village, due to its hot climate and hard living conditions, dangerous criminals are sent into exile. They want to escape from the area, so they ask a middleman to strike a deal with Khorshid. Khorshid is asked to illegally take them out of the country with his boat. At first he is reluctant, but because of the hardships of living he accepts the job.

The criminals murder one of the village's wealthiest merchants and steal the money needed for the trip. At the beginning of the journey the criminals kill the middleman, in the middle of the trip they attack Khorshid and his crewman. The crewman is killed, Khorshid faces them single-handedly. He manages to kill all the criminals, but he himself dies due to the injuries he sustained.

== Comparisons with To Have and Have Not ==
Apart from the shift of location from Cuba to Iran, the main difference lies in the fact that the female character is overshadowed in Taghvai's adaptation and has a smaller role. The Chinese immigrants of the novel are excluded - the four Cubans become Iranian criminals in exile, who are much more evil and uncontrolled.

Harry Morgan is first pictured as a cold-blooded murderer but later we find out that he is a good man, Khorshid has our sympathy from the beginning.

The ending is also different, as Khorshid dies in his boat.

The most important similarity is the fact that Khorshid, similarly to Morgan, is driven to crime by economic worries.
