= Iraj Pezeshkzad =

Iranian writer (1928–2022)

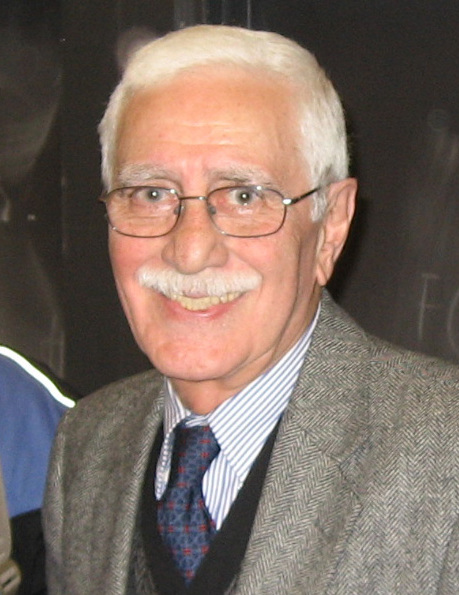
- Pezeshkzad in 2008
- Born: 29 January 1927; Tehran, Iran
- Died: 12 January 2022 (aged 94); Los Angeles, California, U.S.
- Occupations: Writer, translator
- Years active: 1950–2022
- Notable work: Dā'i Jān Napoleon
- Political party: National Resistance Movement
- Parent(s): Hossein Pezeshkzad; Fekri Ershad
- Relatives: Moayed-ol Mamalek Fekri Ershad (grandfather)

Iraj Pezeshkzad (Persian: ایرج پزشکزاد, Iraj Pezeškzâd; 29 January 1927 – 12 January 2022) was an Iranian writer and author of the famous Persian novel Dā'i Jān Napoleon (Dear Uncle Napoleon, translated as My Uncle Napoleon) published in the early 1970s.

== Life and career ==
Pezeshkzad was born in Tehran, Iran, on 29 January 1927. His mother was an aristocrat from the Qajar dynasty. Pezeshkzad grew up surrounded by extended family in a compound with a large garden. His childhood experiences later inspired his most famous novel, "My Uncle Napoleon". He was educated in Iran before studying in France, where he received his degree in law. He served as a judge in the Iranian Judiciary for five years prior to joining the Iranian Foreign Service. He served as a diplomat until the Iranian revolution in 1979, and left the Foreign Service to reside in France after the revolution, where he joined Shapour Bakhtiar and his party the National Movement of Iranian Resistance against the Islamic regime established in Iran. He wrote many political books for the party (example: "Moroori bar vagheye 15 khordad 42, az entesharat e nehzat e moghavemat e melli e Iran, Iraj Pezeshkzad"). Pezeshkzad later lived in Paris, where he worked as a journalist. He died on 12 January 2022, at the age of 94, while visiting family in Los Angeles.

== Literary works ==
Pezeshkzad began writing in the early 1950s by translating the works of Voltaire and Molière into Persian and by writing short stories for magazines. He was one of the contributors of a political satire magazine Towfigh. His novels include Haji Mam-ja'far in Paris, Mashalah Khan in the Court of Haroun al-Rashid, Asemun Rismun, Hafez in Love, and Dai Jan Napoleon. He also wrote several plays, including Honar-e Mard beh ze Dolat-e oost tahrir shod, and various articles on the Iranian Constitutional Revolution of 1905–1911, the French Revolution, and the Russian Revolution.

His last novel was Khanevade-ye Nik-Akhtar (The Nik-Akhtar Family). He then published his autobiography titled Golgashtha-ye Zendegi (The Pleasure Grounds of Life).

=== My Uncle Napoleon ===
Pezeshkzad's most famous work My Uncle Napoleon, was published in 1973 and earned him national acclaim and was accoladed by Iranian and international critics alike as a cultural phenomenon. It is a social satire and a masterpiece of contemporary Persian literature. The story is set in a garden in Tehran in the early 1940s at the onset of the Second World War, where three families live under the tyranny of a paranoid patriarch nicknamed Dear Uncle Napoleon.

The book was turned into a highly successful television series soon after its publication and immediately captured the imagination of the whole nation. Its story became a cultural reference point and its characters national icons. The book has been translated to English by Dick Davis as well as a number of other languages including French, German, Russian, Norwegian, and Estonian.

Literary critics of the English-speaking world have given it rave reviews. The Plain Dealer asserted in its praise of the book that My Uncle Napoleon "... may do more to improve U.S.-Iranian relations than a generation of shuttle diplomats and national apologies," and The Washington Post claimed that "Pezeshkzad, like any other author of substance, transcends his cultural boundaries".

Azar Nafisi, Iranian writer and academic, claims in her introduction to the 2006 English edition of the work that "My Uncle Napoleon is in many ways a refutation of the grim and hysterical images of Iran that have dominated the Western world for almost three decades. On so many different levels this novel represents Iran's confiscated and muted voices, revealing a culture filled with a deep sense of irony and humor, as well as sensuality and tenderness".

== Personal life ==
Pezeshkzad married Mahin Chaybani in Iran; she died in 1979. Their one son, Bahman Pezeshkzad, is an artist based in Paris.

Although Pezeshkzad longed to return to Iran after leaving in 1979, he never did.
