= Esmail Davarfar =

Iranian actor

- اسماعیل داورفر
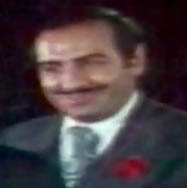
- Born: March 1933; Tehran, Iran
- Died: May 4, 2008 (aged 75); Tehran, Iran
- Education: Dramatic arts at Tehran University
- Occupation: Actor

Esmail Davarfar (Persian: اسماعیل داورفر; March 1933 – 4 May 2008) was an Iranian actor. He graduated from the faculty of Dramatic Arts at Tehran University. Later he traveled to the United States to pursue his professional career.

Esmail Davarfar remained one of Iran's premier actors throughout his lengthy career. His list of credits includes "Doost-Ali Khān" in Dāyi Jān Napoleon (lit.: My Uncle Napoleon).
