= Dozing-off =

2012 play by Ali Nassirian

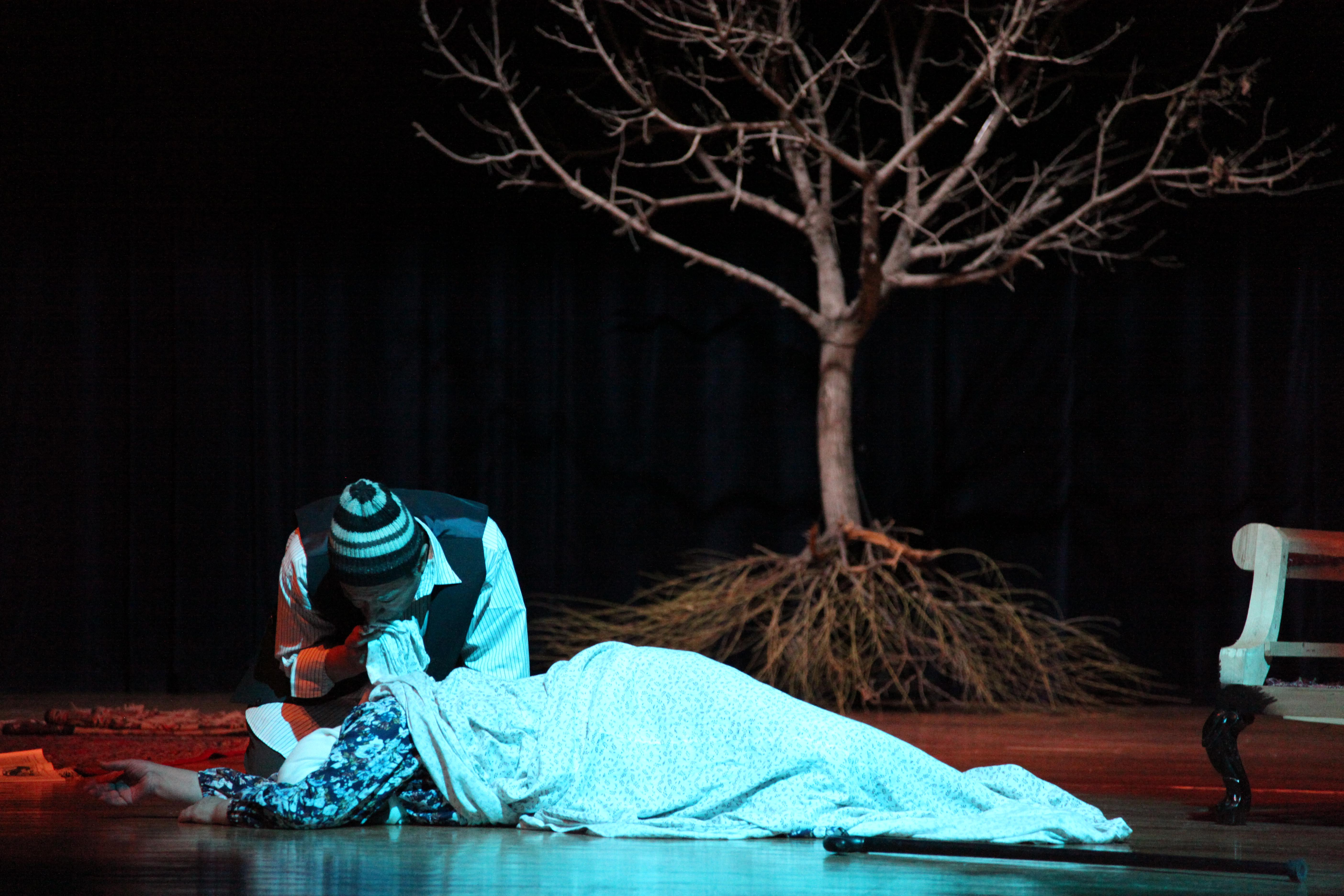
- Dozing-off
- Original language: Persian
- Written by: Ali Nassirian

Premiere
- Date: 2012
- Place: City Theater of Tehran; Tehran, Iran
- Directed by: Mohsen Moeini

Dozing-off (Persian: آدم خوابش می‌گیره) is a 2012 play by Ali Nassirian which depicts the relationship between an actor and his wife on a journey. Mohsen Moeini worked on the project as a dramaturgist, using "Memories of Destruction", a series of paintings by Aydin Aghdashloo. The play premiered in autumn 2012, and ran for two months in Niavaran Cultural Center. It was directed by Mohsen Moeini, produced by Negin Mirhasani Vahed, and starred Ali Nassirian and Mahboobeh Bayat. The music was composed by Ali Ghamsari.

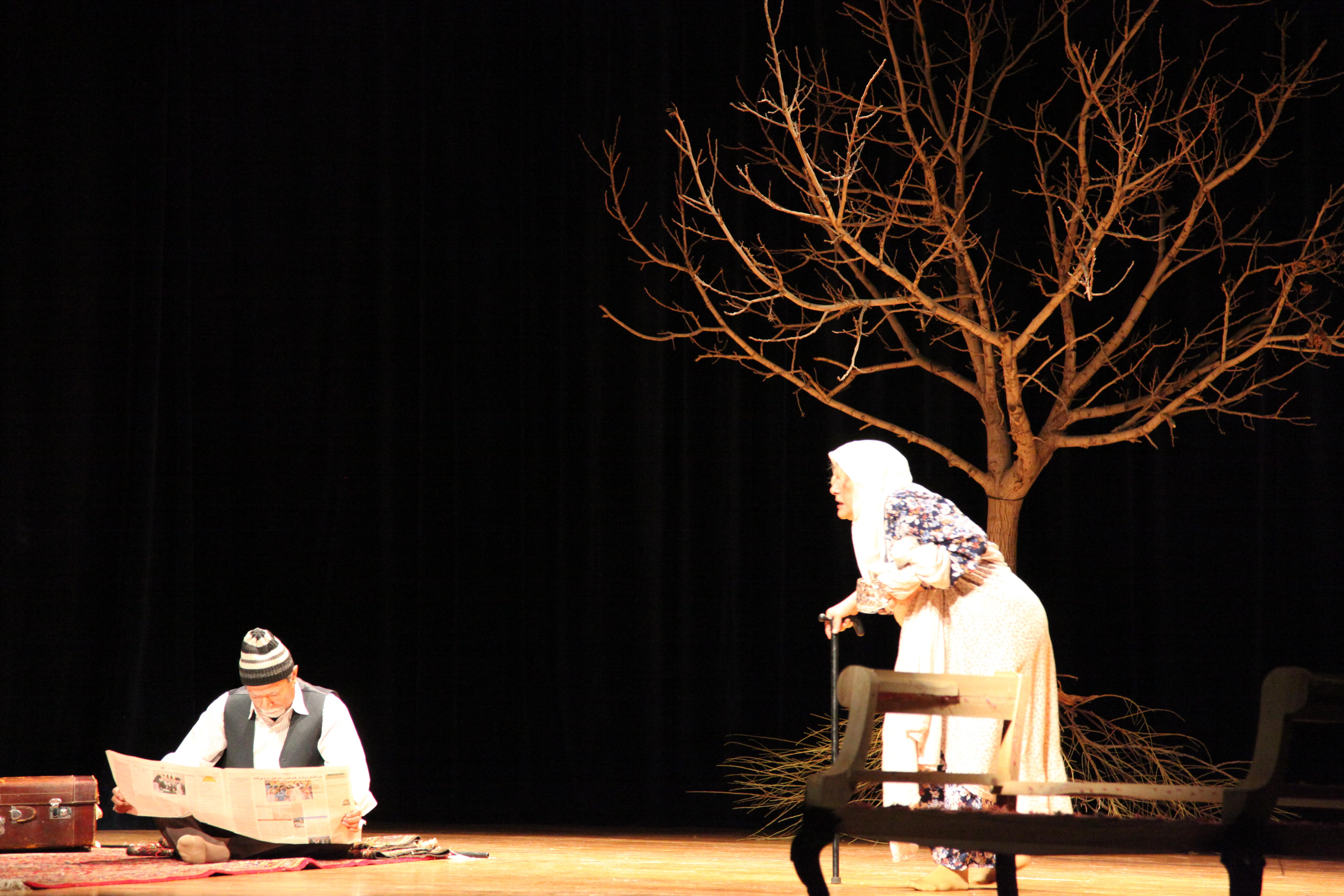
Dozing-off

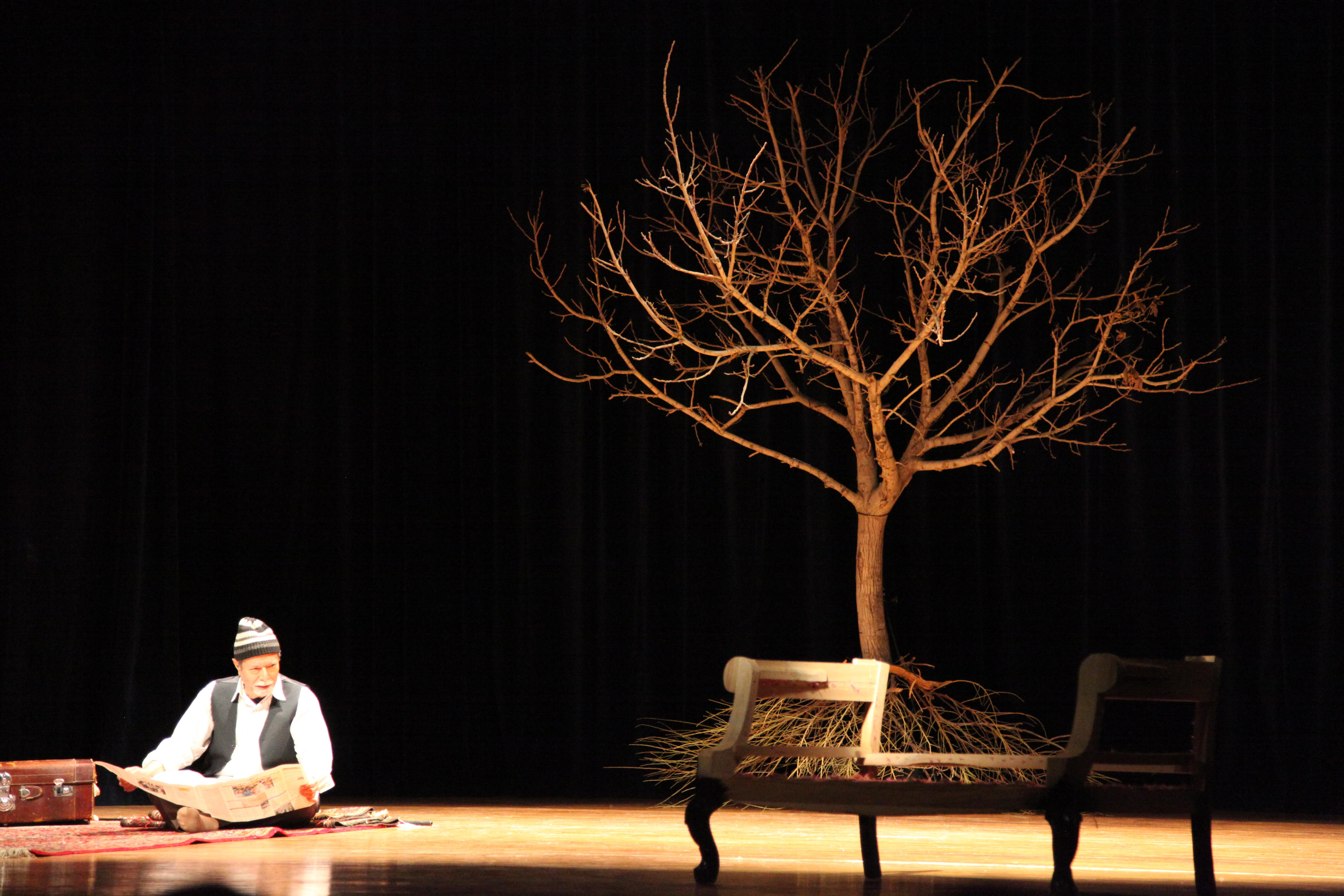
Dozing-off 2012
