= My Uncle Napoleon =

1973 novel by Iraj Pezeshkzad

- English translation's first edition (hardcover) book cover
- Author: Iraj Pezeshkzad
- Original title: دایی جان ناپلئون; Da'i jan Napuli'un
- Translator: Dick Davis
- Language: Persian
- Genre: Fiction
- Publisher: Random House
- Publication date: 1973
- Publication place: Iran
- Media type: Print hardcover
- Pages: 512 pp
- ISBN: 0-934211-48-5
- OCLC: 34285166
- Dewey Decimal: 891/.5533 20
- LC Class: PK6561.P54 D313 1996

My Uncle Napoleon (Persian: دائی جان ناپلئون, Dâ'i jân Nâpel'on, "Dear Uncle Napoleon") is a coming-of-age novel by Iranian author Iraj Pezeshkzad, published in Tehran in Persian in 1973. The novel was adapted as a TV series in 1976, directed by Nasser Taghvai. Although the book and the TV series were briefly banned after the Islamic Revolution of 1979 in Iran, they remained popular. It is noted for lampooning common social attitudes and beliefs in Iran during the period of Allied occupation. Dick Davis translated the novel into English.

== Plot summary ==
The story takes place at the time of Iran's occupation by the Allied forces during the Second World War. Most of the plot occurs in the narrator's home, a huge early 20th-century-style Iranian mansion in which three wealthy families live under the tyranny of a paranoid patriarch, Uncle. The Uncle—who in reality is a retired low-level officer from the Persian Cossack Brigade under Colonel Vladimir Liakhov's command—claims, and in latter stages of the story actually believes, that he and his butler Mash Qasem were involved in wars against the British and their "lackeys", as well as battles supporting the Iranian Constitutional Revolution; and that with the occupation of Iran by the Allied forces, the British are now on course to take their revenge on him. The story's narrator (nameless in the novel but called Saeed in the TV series) is a high school student in love with his cousin Layli, Dear Uncle's daughter.

The novel, at its core a love story, unfolds around the narrator's struggles to stall Layli's pre-arranged marriage to her cousin Puri and ensure their love, a love which is constantly jeopardised by an army of family members and the mayhem of their intrigues against one another. A multitude of supporting characters, including police investigators, government officials, Indians, housewives, a medical doctor, a butcher, a sycophantic preacher, servants, and a shoeshine man also appear throughout the development of the story.

== Literary significance and reception ==
Loosely based on the author's real life experiences and his love for the daughter of a wealthy aristocrat, My Uncle Napoleon story instantly became a cultural reference point and its characters national icons of the '70s. The novel was translated into English by Dick Davis in 1996, and published by Mage Publishers. The English translation has since been re-published by Random House in 2006 with an introduction by Azar Nafisi and an afterword by the author.

The novel is a satire of the Iranian society of the 1940s. The garden in which the story takes place "in more ways than one becomes a microcosm of modern Iranian society".

== Television adaptation ==
My Uncle Napoleon
- Title screen
- دایی جان ناپلئون
- Created by: Iraj Pezeshkzad
- Directed by: Nasser Taghvai
- Starring: Gholam-Hossein Naghshineh; Parviz Fannizadeh; Nosrat Karimi; Parviz Sayyad; Saeed Kangarani
- Narrated by: Houshang Latifpour
- Country of origin: Iran
- Original language: Persian
- No. of episodes: 18

Production
- Executive producers: Nasser Taghvai; Mohsen Taghvai
- Production locations: Lalezar, Tehran
- Camera setup: 16mm film
- Running time: 45 minutes

Original release
- Network: National Iranian Radio and Television
- Release: 1976 – 1976

In 1976, director Nasser Taghvai turned the novel into a television miniseries, compiling the story into 18 episodes. The series was a success both with audiences and the critics. It topped the ratings during every airing of its episodes and it was the most watched show when it played on Friday nights. Many consider the series to be the father of modern television comedy in Iran, and many terms coined during the series' run have become part of Persian popular culture. The series was a huge success financially, as the production cost has been estimated to be 50 million Rials (equivalent to $770,000 in 1976), while the broadcaster was paid about 200 million Rials, four times the production cost, to buy the rights to the series. Due to its popularity, reruns of the series were frequent in the National Iranian Radio and Television until the Islamic revolution of 1979. Although the series has been banned in Iran since the revolution it is still watched, and has been released on DVD by Pars Video, Taraneh Records, and Chehreh Nama.

Widely regarded as one of the most popular television series in Iranian history, My Uncle Napoleon became a cultural phenomenon upon its 1976 release. The Guardian described it as “perhaps the most popular television series” ever produced in Iran.

During its broadcast, the program received high viewership in Iran. It featured humor, recurring characters, and depictions of everyday life.

Even decades later, My Uncle Napoleon remains popular in Iran. Many of its lines have entered common speech, and its characters continue to be recognized and quoted across generations.

=== Cast ===
- Gholam-Hossein Naghshineh as Dear Uncle
- Parviz Fannizadeh as Mash Qasem
- Saeed Kangarani as The Narrator (Saeed)
- Nosrat Karimi as Agha Joon
- Parviz Sayyad as Asadollah Mirza
- Mohamad Ali Keshavarz as Colonel
- Esmail Davarfar as Dustali Khan
- Jahangir Forouhar as Deputy Teymour Khan
- Parvin Malakooti as Aziz al-Saltaneh
- Parvin Soleimani as Cadet Officer Ghiaasabadi's Mother
- Mohammad Varshochi as Cadet Officer Ghiaasabadi
- Sousan Moghadam as Layli
- Kheirollah Tafreshi Azad as Shamsali Mirza
- Bahman Zarrinpour as Puri
- Zari Zandipour as Qamar
- Mir Ahmad Irvanloo as Dr. Naser al-Hokama
- Mastaneh Jazayeri as Akhtar
- Fereydoun Nariman as Asghar the Diesel
- Karmen Zaki as Farokh Laqa
- Mahmood Lotfi as Shir Ali the Butcher
- Minoo Abrishami as Tahereh
- Gril Singh as Sarda Maharat Khan

=== Crew ===
- Nasser Taghvai (Producer)
- Alireza Zarrindast (Cinematographer)
- Abbas Ganjavi (Editor)
- Amir Farrokh Tehrani (Architect, Production Designer and Art Director)
- Eskandar Radfar (Costume Design)
- Abdollah Eskandari ( Make-up Artist)
- Mohsen Taghvai (Assistant Director)
- Shariar Parsipour (Assistant Director)
- Elli Safari (Assistant Director)
- Valod Aghajanian (Sound Department)
- Yadollah Asgari (Sound Department)
- Hassan Zahedi (Sound Department)
- Einollah Safouri (Director of Production)

== Main characters ==
- Dear Uncle Napoleon (Daï Jan Napoleon): The patriarch of the family, Dear Uncle is a paranoid, imaginative and delusional character who believes he is in constant conflict with the British and their "lackeys". The title "Uncle Napoleon" is sarcastically given to him by his nieces and nephews due to his admiration and obsession with the French Emperor Napoleon Bonaparte.
- Mash Qasem: Dear Uncle's faithful servant and butler from the small town of Ghiasabad. Strongly devoted to Dear Uncle, who claims to have fought alongside him in numerous battles, the most important of which are the Battle of Mamasani and the Battle of Kazeroun. He's proud of his native town and becomes the messenger between the narrator and Layli at times when the two cannot meet, partly as a favor to the narrator and partly to satisfy his own unbounded inquisitiveness.
- The Narrator (Saeed): The narrator of the story and Dear Uncle's nephew. He remains nameless and rather arcane in the novel despite being the central figure around whom the story develop.
- Agha Joon: The narrator's father, a pharmacist who is the brother-in-law of Dear Uncle. After years of being ridiculed by Dear Uncle for not belonging to an aristocratic family, he takes his revenge by reinforcing Dear Uncle's delusion that the British are after him.
- Asadollah Mirza: An official in the Foreign Ministry and half brother (through his father's gardener's daughter) of Shams Ali Mirza. A playboy, Asadollah Mirza was once happily married and in love with a woman until she cheated on him and left him. The "Mirza" of his and his brother's name is an honorific which indicates a distant relation to the Qajar royal family. As a result, he is often referred to as "Shahzdeh", or prince. He becomes a close friend of the narrator during the course of the novel, often trying to help him in his efforts to reach his love.

== Supporting characters ==
- Colonel (Sarhang): Dear Uncle's younger brother, referred to as Colonel by the family. In the final chapter that reveals the fate of characters around 1965, it is revealed he is retired as a "Sargord" (Major), a lower rank than a colonel, and is living with Laily and Puri in the garden.
- Dustali Khan: Dear Uncle's brother-in-law, known for being inept at nearly everything and getting constantly ridiculed of by the other members of the family, especially Asadollah Mirza. His wife tries to cut his penis off with a kitchen knife after finding out that he has cheated on her, and shoots him in the bottom when he impregnates his step daughter.
- Aziz al-Saltaneh: Dustali Khan's wife and Qamar's mother. A cousin of Asadollah and Shams Ali Mirza.
- Dr. Naser al-Hokama: An old family doctor and close friend. He has been married three times. His rudimentary knowledge of medicine is often ridiculed in the book.
- Shams Ali Mirza: The older half brother of Asadollah Mirza. A discharged/retired District Attorney who believes that all problems can be solved by interrogation.
- Layli: The only child of Dear Uncle. She and the narrator fall in love despite her arranged marriage.
- Puri: The clumsy son of Colonel who is destined to marry Layli. A subject of ridicule by the narrator, he is conscripted by the army to fight the Allied invasion, but faints in battle after hearing a gunshot. He loses one of his testicles in a fight with the narrator, becoming a subject of Dr. Naser al-Hokama's treatments.
- Qamar: The mentally challenged, overweight daughter of Aziz al-Saltaneh from her first marriage and Dustali Khan's stepdaughter. The family goes to great lengths to find her a husband and save her honor after she is found impregnated by Dustali Khan.
- Deputy Taymur Khan: An "internationally renowned" detective famous for his aggressive methods of deduction.
- Cadet Officer Ghiaasabadi: An old opium addicted detective and Deputy Taymur Khan's assistant who eventually marries Qamar and wins her inheritance money, overcoming Dustali Khan in the process.
- Naneh Rajab: Cadet Officer Ghiaasabadi's mother.
- Akhtar: Cadet Officer Ghiasabdi's sister, a promiscuous woman who dances at a nightclub.
- Asghar the Diesel: Akhtar's boyfriend, a street thug.
- Farokh Laqa: A bitter old woman who has never been married and is always in search of funerals to attend.
- Sardar Maharat Khan: A Sikh Indian businessman; though not a military man, his honorific Persian title of Sardar means "Commander". Dear Uncle thinks that he is a British spy.
- Lady Maharat Khan: The Sardar's blonde British wife.
- Shir Ali the Butcher: A giant, violent butcher, protective of his wife Tahereh's honor, but too simple to realize her infidelity. The "Shir" in his name means "lion".
- Tahereh: Shir Ali's lascivious wife whom everyone in the neighborhood, from Dustali Khan to Asadollah Mirza, sleep with.
- Houshang: A local cobbler and shoe shiner whom Dear Uncle believes is sent by the Germans to protect him from the British.
- Seyed Abolqasem: A local preacher.
- Naneh Bilqis: Dear Uncle's maid and chef.

== English translation publication history ==
- 1996, US, Mage Publishers ISBN 0-934211-48-5, Hardcover
- 2006, US, Random House, ISBN 0-8129-7443-3, Paperback
