= Gholam-Hossein Naghshineh =

Iranian actor

Gholam Hossein Naghshineh غلامحسین نقشینه
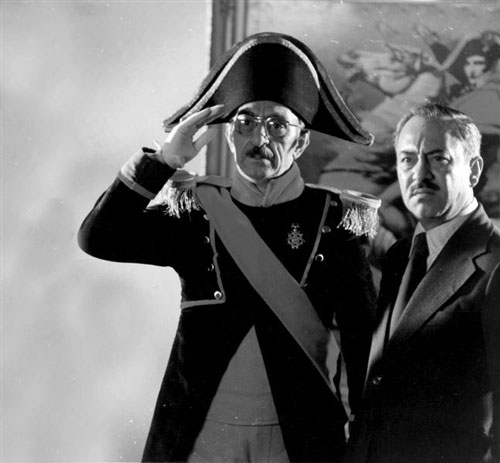
- Gholam Hossein Naghshineh during filming of My Uncle Napoleon
- Born: Gholam-Hossein Naghshineh; 1908; Tehran, Iran
- Died: June 7, 1996 (aged 87–88); Tehran, Iran
- Years active: 1918–1989

Gholam-Hossein Naghshineh (Persian: غلامحسین نقشینه; 1908 – June 7, 1996) was an Iranian actor and the father of Iranian theatre. He is best known for playing "Uncle" in My Uncle Napoleon ("Dā'i Jān Napoleon)".
