= Nasser Taghvai =

Iranian film director and screenwriter (1941–2025)

- ناصر تقوایی
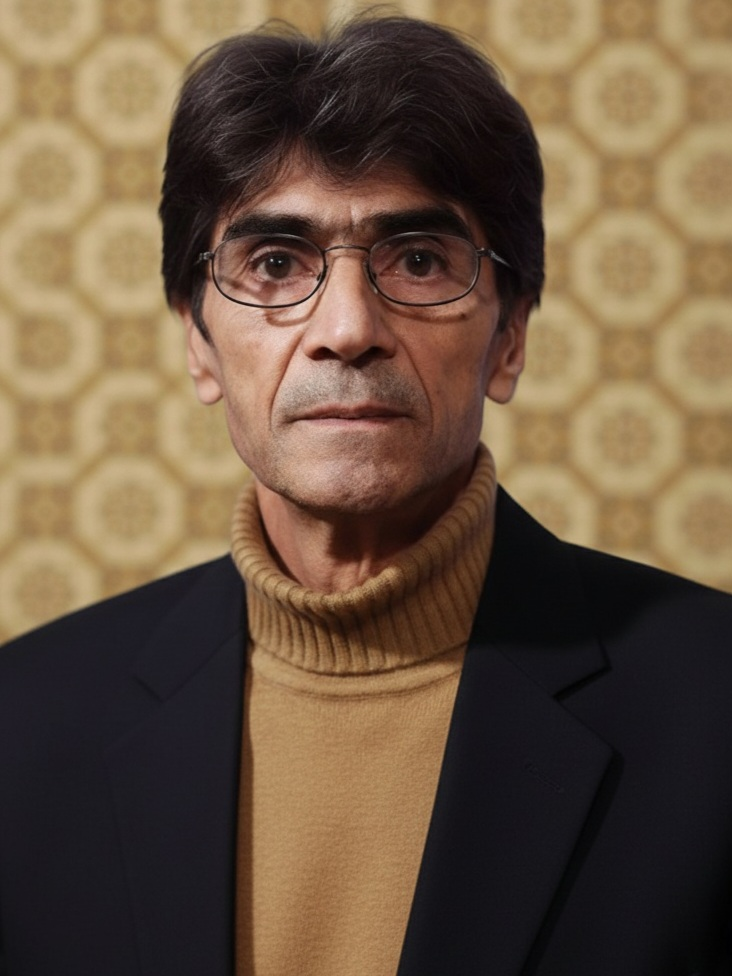
- Born: 13 July 1941; Abadan, Iran
- Died: 14 October 2025 (aged 84); Tehran, Iran
- Resting place: Imamzadeh Taher
- Occupations: Writer; Photographer; Film director; Screenwriter
- Years active: 1961–2025
- Spouse(s): Shahrnush Parsipur (m. 1961; div. 1967) Shahindokht Behzadi (divorced) Marzieh Vafamehr (m. 1996)
- Children: Ali
- Relatives: Shokufeh Kavani (daughter-in-law)

Nasser Taghvai (Persian: ناصر تقوایی, also romanized as Nāser Taghvā'i and Nāser Taqvāyi; 13 July 1941 – 14 October 2025) was an Iranian film director and screenwriter. He is best known for his television series, My Uncle Napoleon.

== Life and career ==
Taghvāi was born in Abadan, Iran on 13 July 1941. After early experiences as a story writer, he began filming documentaries in 1967. He made his debut, Tranquility in the Presence of Others, in 1970 and gained the attention of Iranian critics. His concern for the ethnography and atmosphere of southern Iran is notable in his films.

Most of his works were based on novels. Captain Khorshid is an adaptation of Ernest Hemingway's To Have and Have Not, which won the third prize at the 48th Locarno International Film Festival in Switzerland in 1988.

In 1999 he directed a segment of the film Tales of Kish, which was nominated for the Palme d'Or at the Cannes Film Festival.

Taghvai died on 14 October 2025, at the age of 84.

== Filmography ==
- Rahaee (Short Film), 1971
- Tranquility in the Presence of Others, 1972
- Sadeq the Kurdish, 1972
- Curse, 1973
- My Uncle Napoleon (TV series), 1976
- Koochak-e-Jangali, 1980-1983 was banned by I.R.I.B
- Captain Khorshid, 1987
- Oh Iran, 1990
- Tales of Kish ("Greek Ship" episode), 1999
- Unruled Paper, 2001
- Zangi and Rumi, 2002 was banned by The Ministry of Intelligence of the Islamic Republic of Iran
- Bitter tea, 2003 was banned by The Ministry of Intelligence of the Islamic Republic of Iran

== Awards and nominations ==
- Golden Gate Award for Best Short Film at the San Francisco International Film Festival for Rahaee (Short Film), 1971
- Golden Lion for Best Short Film Award at the Venice Film Festival for Rahaee (Short Film), 1972
- Silver Lion for Best First Work Award at the Venice Film Festival for Tranquility in the Presence of Others, 1972
- Golden India Catalina for Best Short Film Award at the Cartagena Film Festival for Rahaee (Short Film), 1974
- Nominated for Best Director Award at the Fajr International Film Festival for Captain Khorshid, 1987
- Nominated for Golden Leopard and winner of Bronze Leopard at the 48th Locarno International Film Festival for Captain Khorshid, 1988
- Nominated for the Palme d'Or at the Cannes Film Festival for Tales of Kish, 1999
- Special Jury Award (Best Directing) at the Fajr International Film Festival for Unruled Paper, 2002

== See also ==
- Iranian New Wave
