= Blood on the Cat's Neck =

1971 play originally written by Rainer Werner Fassbinder

Blood on the Cat's Neck or Blood on the Neck of the Cat is an absurdist 1971 play originally written by Rainer Werner Fassbinder. It was first produced in Nuremberg under the title Blut am Hals der Katze. It is sometimes subtitled Marilyn Monroe vs. The Vampires. In translation, it has been revived several times, including a six-month stint at the Trap Door Theatre in 1996 and then the Mercury Theater in Chicago.

The Chicago production of the play at the Trap Door Theatre under director Andrew Cooper Wasser starred Beata Pilch, Sean Marlow, Kristie Hassinger, Summer Chance, Eileen James, Valentine Miele, Michael Garvey, Bob Rusch, and others. It was performed again in 2013 to mark the 20th anniversary of the theatre. Clive Mantle also once starred in a production of it. More recently the play has been put on in an Ian W. Hill production at The Brick Theater in which Gyda Arber starred as Phoebe the alien as a "voluptuous blonde in a torn dress", Danny Bowes as the cop, and Toya Lillard as the mistress. in 2017 at Baran theater This play was directed by Mohsen Moeini in Iran.

== Plot ==
The play visits the question of how an alien from space might view humanity; the alien in the play is an attractive woman named Phoebe Zeitgeist, an alien vampire taken from a 1960s comic book. In this play, she is surrounded by horrible people at a cocktail party and learns how to speak from them. The play has three sections: an opening section in which the main characters give monologues that reveal themselves; a second section in which Phoebe speaks one-on-one with these characters, picking up certain phrases from them; and the final section, in which Phoebe, using her limited vocabulary, repeats back "their aphoristic and self-justifying slogans", with the other characters divided over whether she is smart or drunk.

== Reception ==
Jack Helbig of the Chicago Reader described it as a "darkly sarcastic, gloriously messy absurdist play about an alien [...] who comes into the world naked and guileless and learns to play all our dangerous games."

Kerry Reid of the Chicago Tribune says that Fassbinder's dark world view is shallow, but still fresher than the similar worldview of more recent filmmaker and playwright Neil LaBute.
