= Baba Shamal =

Discontinued satirical magazine in Iran (1943–1947)

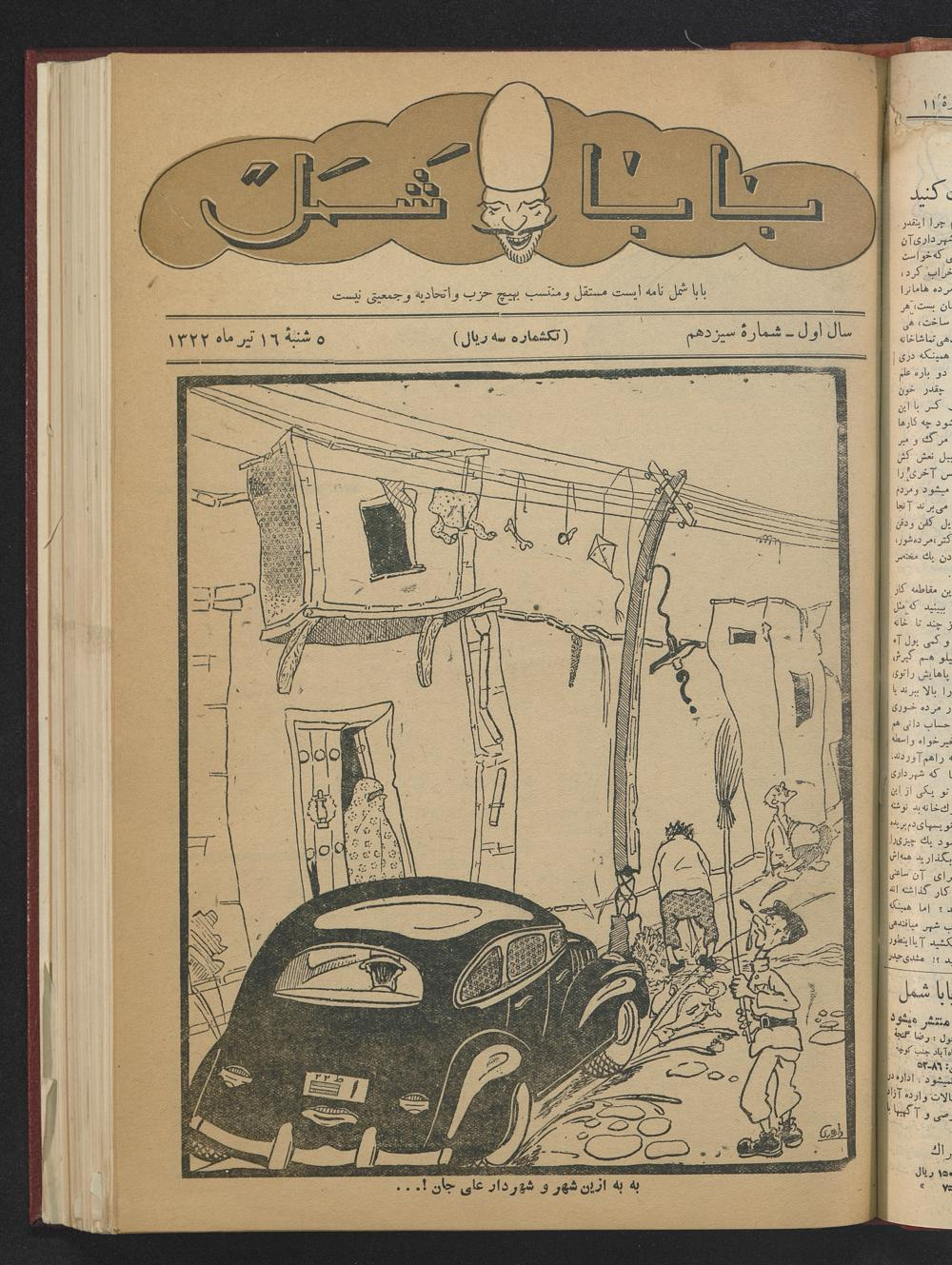
- title page of the Vol. 1, No. 13, 8 July 1943
- Editor: Reżā Ganjaʾī
- Categories: Satire
- Frequency: Weekly (until 1945)
- Founded: 1943
- Final issue: 1947
- Country: Iran
- Language: Persian
- Website: Bābā Šamal

The Persian-language journal Baba Shamal (Persian: باباشمل) was one of the most famous political satire magazines in Iran. It was published weekly between 1943 and 1945 by Reżā Ganjaʾī (1918–1995). After his return from Europe in 1947, 50 volumes more were distributed. Ganjaʾī was a cabinet member and an engineering university professor. Before and after his publishership Ganjaʾī held some important positions in ministries and in the banking and insurance sector. He published his articles under the pseudonym “Donb-al-mohandesīn“. Many well-known Iranian satirists, poets and authors were his supporters and co-workers, i.e., Rahī Moʿayyerī (Zāḡča), Eqteṣād (Shaikh Pašm-al-Dīn), Fozūnī (Mohandes-al-Šoʿarāʾ) and Ṣahbā (Shaikh Somā).

The journal was widespread in Iran and was characterized by its everyday language and colloquial style. The general satirical opinion of the authors found its expression in current daily politics which was supplemented by partly colored caricatures and drawings. In general the journal's position was nationalistic, independent and moderate. However, its critique led – under the pressure of censorship – to its suspension in 1947.
