= Mohsen Moeini =

Iranian author and director (born 1979)

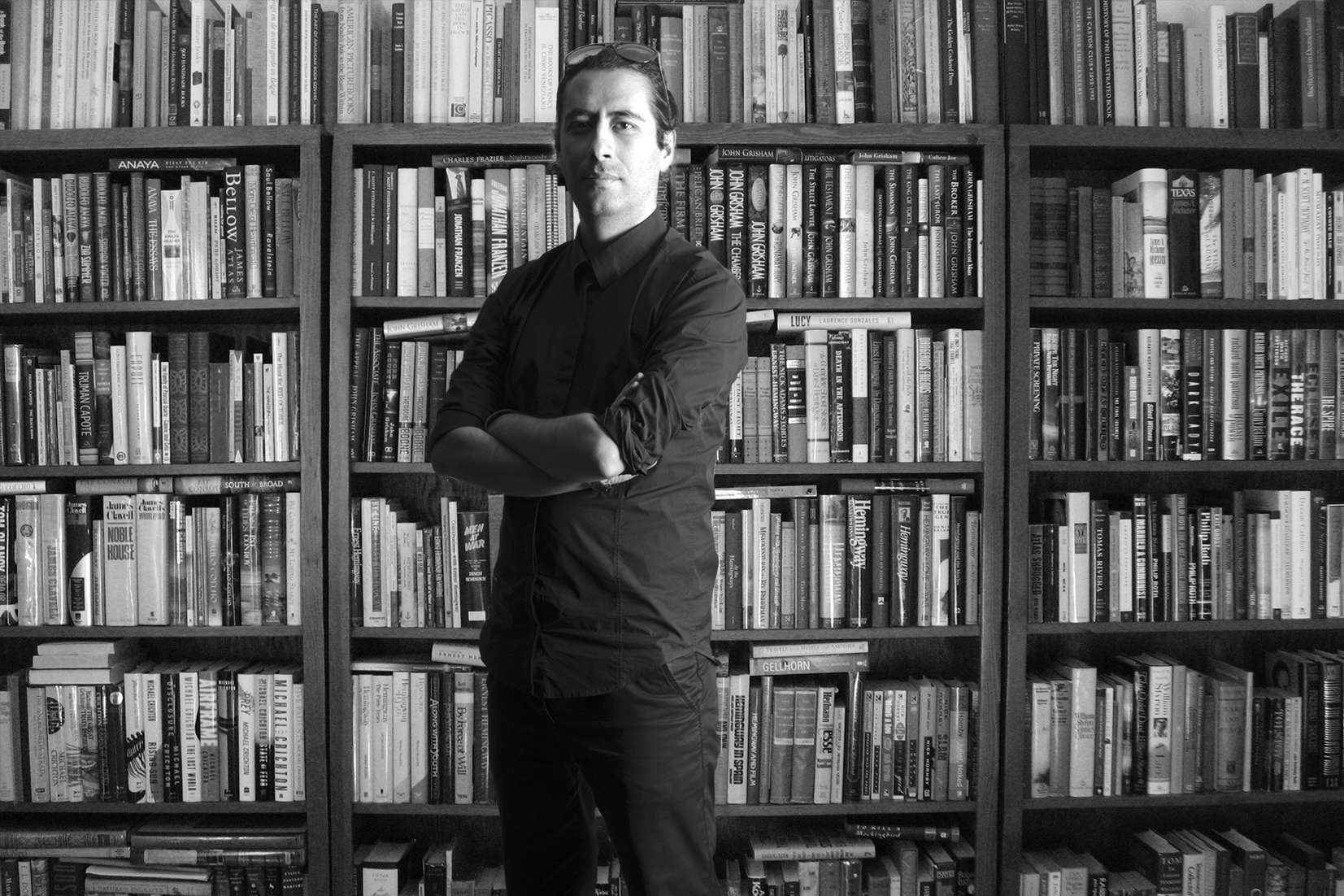
- Mohsen Moeini in 2015
- Born: 27 March 1979 (age 47); Tehran, Iran
- Occupations: writer, playwright, film director, theatre director, screenwriter
- Years active: 1999–present

Mohsen Moeini (born 27 March 1979) is an Iranian author and director. His work mainly centers around his philosophical and historical preoccupations. As well as directing his own plays, he has directed plays by foreign authors such as Peter Handke and Rainer Werner Fassbinder whose works he staged in Iran for the first time. He has directed the first play to be staged in the Milad Tower.

== Works ==
=== TV series (as writer and director) ===
- 2016 Heights Underneath, seven-episode teleplay, channel 4
- 2014 Utrush, 13-episode teleplay,

=== Theatre ===
==== Plays (as writer and director) ====
- 2011 Tenth Mind, Nazerzadeh Hall, Iranshahr theater
- 2013 Turandot, adapted from Puccini's opera and Nezami's story, Niavaran Cultural Center
- 2014 On the Fast Horse, Milad Tower, Tehran
- 2014 A Thousand Mirrors, Milad Tower, Tehran
- 2015 The Chant of Gabriel's Wing, Andisheh Hall
- 2016 Lion in Chains, Andisheh Hall

==== Plays (as director) ====
- 2012 The Actor and His Wife, starring Ali Nassirian and Mahboobeh Bayat, Niavaran Cultural Center
- 2012 Dozing-off, starring Ali Nassirian and Mahboobeh Bayat, Niavaran Cultural Center
- 2015 Kaspar, a play by Peter Handke, translator and director, Av theater (Da)
- 2017 Blood on the Cat's Neck, translator and director, Baran theater

=== Book ===
- 2005 Hermeneutics and drama

== Actors ==
- Ali Nasirian
- Mahbobeh Bayat
- Farokh Nemati
- Hassan Joharchi
- Kazem Efrandnia
- Mehdi Faghih
- Pardis Afkari
- Kamran Tafti
- Ardalan Shoja Kaveh
- Leila Boloukat

== See also ==
- Iranian cinema
- Iranian modern and contemporary art
- Persian theatre
