= List of speeches given by Bahram Beyzai =

This is a list of Bahram Beyzai's speeches.

Among other occupations, throughout his career Beyzai has been a relatively prolific speaker as an academic as well as a public intellectual. Most of his notable oral output consists of Persian lectures at a number of universities, most often in Iran and the United States, but also occasionally in countries as various as France, Scotland and Canada. The majority of these is lost forever, sometimes only surviving in names and dates of the events or classes. Some are available as voice recordings, either published in print as well, like "On the Situation of Theatre and Cinema" (1977), or not; and some, particularly in the later years of Beyzai's career, are published as videos.

Beyzai has had very few television and radio appearances. Nevertheless, his picture is preserved in some documentaries where he has been interviewed either about his work or else.

== Public ==
Year	Date	Subject / Title	Venue	Notes
1970	unknown	Q&A at a theatre round table	unknown	YouTube: video
1977	October 12	"On the Situation of Theatre and Cinema"	German Cultural Institute, Tehran	On the third night of Goethe Poetry Nights (voice)
1991	October 4	Hitchcock's cinema	Tehran	Published as a book in 1995
2005	November 16	"Where Is Hezar Afsan?"	Farzan Publishers	
2006	December 26	Bahram Beyzai Bukhara night	Iranian artists forum	
2008	October 29	Aydin Aghdashloo	Iranian artists forum	
2009	January 31	When We Are All Asleep	Cinema Palestine	
2009	March 10	Q&A about When We Are All Asleep	University of Tehran	
2009	November 21	Akbar Radi	Arasbaran Cultural Centre	
2011	winter	unknown	Stanford University	
2011	winter	unknown	Stanford University	
2011	winter	unknown	Stanford University	
2011	winter	unknown	Stanford University	
2011	winter	unknown	Stanford University	
2011	winter	unknown	Stanford University	
2011	winter	unknown	Stanford University	
2011	winter	unknown	Stanford University	
2011	winter	unknown	Stanford University	
2011	winter	unknown	Stanford University	
2011	spring	"Cinema and Mythology"	Stanford University	
2011	spring	"Cinema and Mythology"	Stanford University	
2011	spring	"Cinema and Mythology"	Stanford University	
2011	spring	"Cinema and Mythology"	Stanford University	
2011	spring	"Cinema and Mythology"	Stanford University	
2011	spring	"Cinema and Mythology"	Stanford University	
2011	spring	"Cinema and Mythology"	Stanford University	
2011	spring	"Cinema and Mythology"	Stanford University	
2011	spring	"Cinema and Mythology"	Stanford University	
2011	spring	"Cinema and Mythology"	Stanford University	
2011	May 21	unknown	Stanford University	
2011	June 4	Shahnameh	Ferdowsi Society of Northern California	YouTube: video
2011	November 10	Bita prize address	Stanford University	YouTube: video
2011	November 20	"Derakht-e Sokhangoo" ("The Eloquent Tree")	University of California, Los Angeles	
2011	November 21	"A Night with Bahram Beyzai"	University of California, Los Angeles	
2012	May 18	"About Jana and Baladoor"	Stanford University	English translation by Abbas Milani (YouTube: part 1 - part 2)
2012	December 1	Farhang foundation Heritage award address	unknown	
2012	December 2	"Myths in Bahram Beyzaie's Works"	University of California, Los Angeles	(YouTube: part 1 - part 2 - part 3 - part 4)
2013	January 24	Hamlet, Prince of Grief	Stanford University	
2013	February 21	"Semiotics of Iranian Myths: The Meaning of Shahnameh as a Social Work"	Stanford University	YouTube: video
2013	February 28	"Semiotics of Iranian Myths: Ferdowsi - The Meaning of Shahnameh as a Social Work"	Stanford University	YouTube: video
2013	March 7	"Semiotics of Iranian Myths: Non-written Myths of Pre-Shahnameh Period - The Creation of Mankind and After"	Stanford University	YouTube: video
2013	March 14	"Semiotics of Iranian Myths: Analytic View of the Legend of Rostam and Sohrab"	Stanford University	YouTube: video
2013	March 22	"Semiotics of Iranian Myths: Iranian Myths (in Traditional Spectacles) - The Thousand-and-first Night"	Stanford University	YouTube: video
2013	July 26	Arash	Stanford University	YouTube: video
2013	August 7	Downpour	Stanford University	YouTube: video
2013	October 12	SINA award address	Harvard University	
2013	November 10	"The Legend of Gilgamesh according to Bahram Beyzaei"	University of California, Berkeley	YouTube: part 1 - part 2 - part 3
2014	February 25	to the memory of Amin Banani	Stanford University	YouTube: video
2014	April 12	Old Songs	Stanford University	
2014	May 2	Q&A about The Chronicle of Bondar the Bidakhsh	Stanford University	
2014	May 9	"Looking for Arash the Archer"	Stanford University	YouTube: video
2014	July 9	Bashu, the Little Stranger	Stanford University	
2014	December 13	a qasida to the memory of Simin Behbahani	Stanford University	YouTube: video
2015	April 26	Q&A in "An Evening with Iranian Scholars"	Stanford University	YouTube: video
2015	August 22	before the play-reading of The Thousand-and-first Night at Tirgan Festival	Toronto	YouTube: video
2015	August 23	Q&A about When We Are All Asleep	Parya Trillium Foundation, Toronto	YouTube: video
2015	September 26	The Thousand-and-first Night	Golden Gate Park, San Francisco	YouTube: video
2015	November 6	Ehsan Yarshater	Stanford University	YouTube: video
2016	January 14	to the memory of Houshang Golshiri - Q&A	Stanford University	YouTube: part 1 - part 2
2016	January 26	Ferdowsi	Ferdowsi Society of Northern California	YouTube: video
2016	February 17	Tarabnameh	Stanford University	YouTube: video
2016	April 12	Q&A about Tarabnameh	Stanford University	YouTube: video
2016	October 12	Tarabnameh	Stanford University	YouTube: video
2017	June 23	Downpour	University of St Andrews	
2017	June 24	"Zahhak and Jamshid"	University of St Andrews	
2017	July 29	address on "A Tribute to Bahram Beyzaie" and reception of the Arash Award of Tirgan Festival	Harbourfront Centre Studio Theatre, Toronto	YouTube: video
2018	April 23	Q&A about Crossroads	Stanford University	video on Stanford website
2018	May 19	Q&A about Bashu, the Little Stranger	University of California, Los Angeles	YouTube: part 1 - part 2

== Regular lectures ==
=== At the University of Tehran (1970s) ===
- "Oriental Theater"

=== At Stanford University (2010s) ===
- "The Iranian Cinema: Image and Meaning"
- "Iranian Cinema in Diaspora"
- "Contemporary Iranian Theater"

== Spoken messages ==
- to Asghar Farhadi, congratulating the Academy Award for Best Foreign Language Film for The Salesman

== Interviews and talks ==
=== Making-ofs ===
- Travelers on the Way
- A Brief Dossier for Killing Mad Dogs

=== Other documentaries ===
==== About himself ====
- Bahram Beyzai: A Cultural Legend

==== Else ====
- Ahmad Shamlou: Master Poet of Liberty
- Iran, une révolution cinématographique (2006)

=== Journalistic ===
List in Persian
