= Crossroads (play) =

2009 play by Bahram Beyzai

- Original language: Persian
- Written by: Bahram Beyzai
- Setting: Tehran about the year 2006

Premiere
- Date: March 23, 2018
- Place: Roble Studio Theater
- Directed by: Bahram Beyzai

Crossroads (Persian: چهارراه) is a play by Bahram Beyzai, written in 2009 and first staged in 2018 at Stanford University.

== Text ==
Written in 2009, Crossroads is the last play Beyzai wrote before he left Iran. The text was published as a book in the winter of 2020.

== First production ==
Crossroads was premiered at Roble Studio Theater, Stanford on 23 March 2018. It was directed by the author and the two major roles were played by Mojdeh Shamsaie and Ali Zandiyye.
