= Stanford University student housing =

University student accommodation

Coordinates: 37°25′30″N 122°10′45″W

Since the founding, Stanford University has provided on-campus housing for students. Today, all undergraduate students, most graduate students, and many graduate employees use campus housing. While not all graduate students are eligible for campus or subsidized off-campus housing, of those that are, only 64% are able to take advantage of this opportunity due to the limited housing stock. Student Housing at Stanford is currently part of Residential & Dining Enterprises, an in-house standalone vendor within the Stanford affiliated network of businesses.

Undergraduate housing is organized as being East Campus, West Campus, or the Row. East Campus has the complexes of Stern, Wilbur, and Gerhard Casper Quad and the standalone dormitories of Branner, Toyon, Mirrielees, and Crothers. West Campus has the complexes of Florence Moore Hall, Lagunita Court, and Governor's Corner and the standalone Roble Hall. The Row is on the south-east to south side of campus and consists of about 3 dozen houses housing between 25 and 60 students each. These include the 6 fraternity houses and 3 sorority houses (as of 2016/2017). Married (or officially partnered) undergraduates or those with children are housed with graduate students.

Graduate housing consists of Escondido Village, Rains Houses, Kennedy Graduate Residences, Munger Graduate Residences, GSB (Graduate School of Business) Residences on East Campus and the Lyman Graduate Residences on West Campus. Students with children live in family courtyards among the Escondido Village low-rises. Due to the difficulty of finding reasonably priced off-campus housing and shortage of on-campus housing, Stanford has also leased a large number of off-campus apartments and subleases them to graduate students. By 2020/2021 new buildings in the Escondido Village area will have been constructed for a net gain of 2,000 beds.

== History ==
The architects of Stanford University originally proposed that student housing consist of cottages each housing 15 to 25 students with the cottages for the men to the south-east of the main quad of the university and for the women to the south-west. The founders, Leland and Jane Stanford, rejected the idea and decided that the recently built Hôtel Kursaal de la Maloja in Switzerland would be the model for the original men's dorm, Encina Hall, housing 300. Encina Hall proved problematic as a dorm and now houses administrative offices and the Political Science department. Encina Hall was built well to the east of the Main Quad while the first women's dorm, the original Roble Hall, was built well to the west of the Main Quad just before the university opened in 1891 (about a half a mile separated the two halls). The original Roble plans were shelved when it was realized that it could not be built before the university opened in 1891. Jane Stanford insisted that both men and women be admitted in the first class and so new plans were drawn up for a building using Ernest L. Ransome's reinforced concrete instead of sandstone and it was built in 97 days. Both original dorms were named in Spanish: Encina meaning Live Oak and Robles Blancho [sic] meaning White Oak according to Leland Stanford who decided on the names in 1891 (the latter name was presumably corrected and shortened to just Roble). The tradition of naming many student residences with Spanish names was established. The name, Roble Hall, was later moved to the current Roble Hall (built 1917) and the original building renamed Sequoia Hall, used as a men's dorm then the Statistics department, and eventually torn down in 1996.

East side Branner and Toyon Halls were built in the 1920s for men and west side Lagunita Court was built in the 1930s in part to house the growing number of women after the hard cap of 500 women students was partially lifted. East side Stern and Wilbur halls were built in the 1940s again to house men and west side Florence Moore Hall in 1956 for women. The later 1960s and early 1970s saw all the residence halls become co-ed.

One sign of Stanford's success in building on-campus student housing by the mid-1950s is that by the fall of 1954, 36.0% of Stanford students were housed in university-operated residence halls, while the equivalent number at archrival UC Berkeley was 4.8%. Stanford then paused its construction program and no new halls were built for several decades, though the Manzanita trailer park was set up in 1969 to provide temporary housing. In the early 1980s, west side Sterling Quad (Governor's Corner) was built and in the early 1990s east side Kimball, Castaño, and Lantana Halls were built on what had been the trailer park. In 2015 the new Ng House was opened and in 2016 the Manzanita Park complex was renamed Gerhard Casper Quad.

In addition to the residence halls, there are also the Row Houses for undergraduates; many were originally fraternity or sorority houses though only 9 of the current 35 are now occupied by Greek organizations.

Graduate student residence halls were built in the 1950s for male law students and engineers respectively (Crothers and Crothers Memorial which are now undergraduate residences). Most graduate housing consists of apartment complexes such as Lyman, opened in 1997, Munger, Rains, and GSB (the last has priority for business students). Beginning in the 1950s are the multitude of apartment buildings in Escondido Village which has many townhouses, known as "low-rises", where students with children can live and an elementary school, Escondido School which is part of the Palo Alto Unified School District.

A legacy issue with the pre-1978 construction is the widespread presence of exceptionally hazardous toxins in the building materials. Much of the housing stock retains lead paint and asbestos insulation. As the old housing stock is demolished and rebuilt, these toxins at time are released through carelessness into toxic dust clouds.

== Shuttle service ==
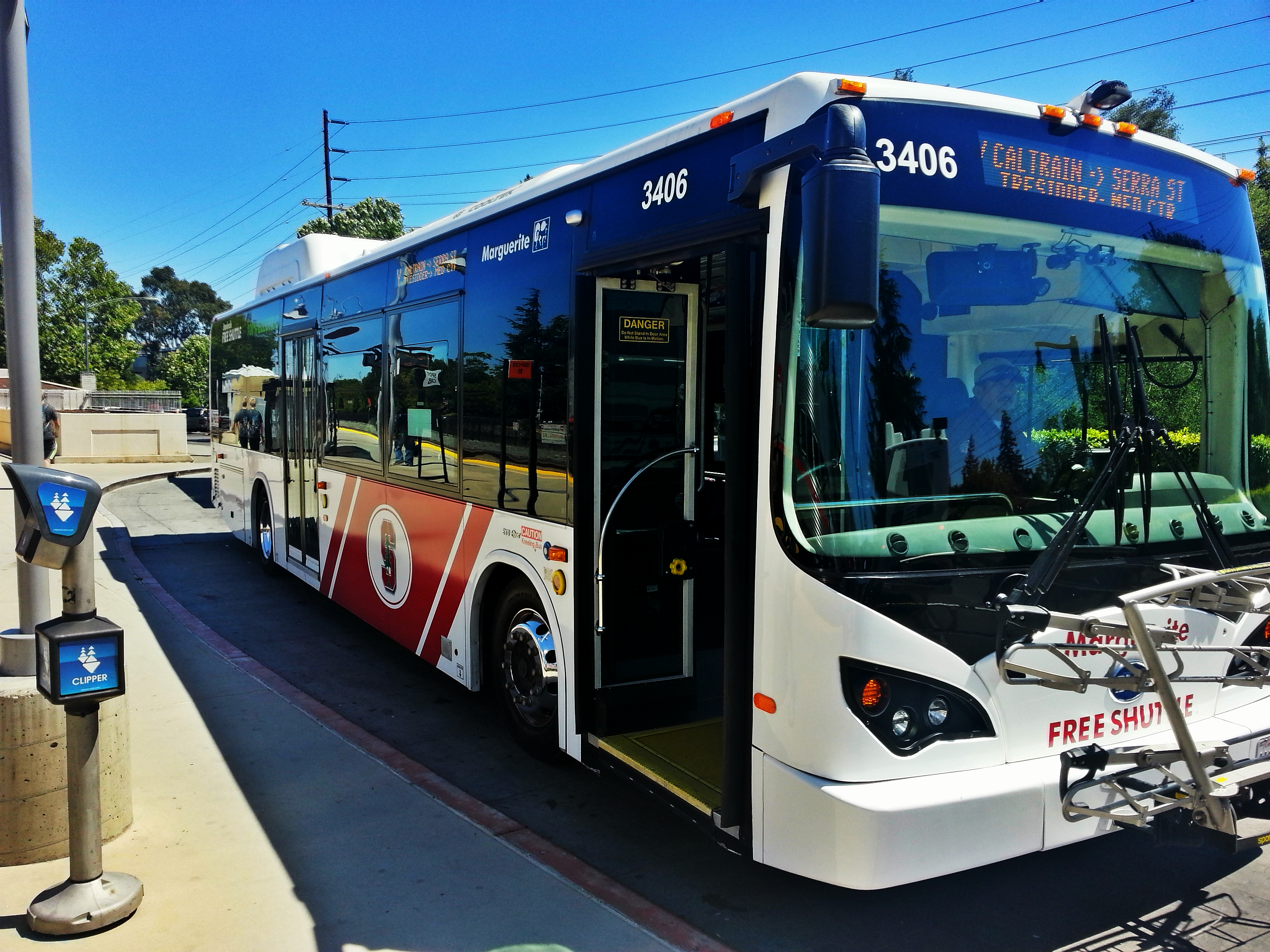
One of Stanford's Marguerite buses (BYD electric bus)

Marguerite is the free shuttle service Stanford University offers to its students, faculty, staff, and the general public to get around campus or from campus to some off-campus locations such as the San Antonio Shopping Center, VA Palo Alto Hospital, Stanford Linear Accelerator (SLAC), Stanford Shopping Center, or the Palo Alto Transit Center. It started small in 1976 with the intent of cutting car traffic on campus; parking fees were started at the same time. In 1989 the university wanted to expand but had to agree not to increase automobile traffic on campus at all to get planning permission from the county; among other methods it expanded the shuttle from commute hours only to all-day and increased the number of routes. In the next 10 years ridership went from 700/day to 3,500/day. In 2005 the number had risen to 4,800/day. By 2013 the estimated number of passengers was 2.3 million/year (about 6,300/day). Marguerite has also acquired hybrid and all-electric buses (total fleet as of June 2015 was 79 buses of which 13 were all-electric and 5 were hybrid).

The Marguerite shuttle is named for the four horse omnibus also called Marguerite run by Jasper Paulsen in the earliest days of the university; it initially cost 10 cents for students, 15 cents for others though the fare was later raised to 25 cents for everyone.

== East Campus (undergraduate) ==
=== Branner Hall ===
Branner Hall was designated an all-freshman dorm in 2021 after Stanford implemented the neighborhood system. It was previously a coed upper-class (i.e., no freshmen) dormitory with a focus on public service. It houses 167 students, mostly in two-room triples. It is named after University President John Casper Branner. It was built in 1924 and was designed by the San Francisco firm of Bakewell and Brown. It was originally an all-male dormitory and later all-female before becoming coed. The Branner Hall served as an Olympic Village for competitors in football at the 1984 Summer Olympics.

=== Crothers Hall ===
Crothers Hall is an all freshman dorm, and the largest frosh dorm on Stanford's campus. It was re-designated an all-frosh dorm in 2021 under the new neighborhood system. It was previously upperclass residence and it occupies two buildings named Crothers Hall and Crothers Memorial (CroMem). The dorm previously had a global citizenship focus. Both Crothers Hall and Crothers Memorial are a mix of single rooms and one room doubles. The dorm is named after an early student and later trustee of the university, George E. Crothers. Both were originally built as graduate residences; Crothers Hall in 1948 for law students and Crothers Memorial in 1955 for engineering students (the latter provided the name for Cromemco, an early Silicon Valley company). They were designed by Eldridge Spencer and William Ambrose.

=== Gerhard Casper Quad ===
Gerhard Casper Quad consists of four houses: Kimball Hall, Castaño (Spanish for chestnut tree), Lantana, and Ng House (Humanities Theme), with a central Gerhard Casper Dining Commons. Built on the site of the former student residence of Manzanita trailer park it was originally named Manzanita Park but was renamed after former university president Gerhard Casper in 2016. Kimball Hall is named for the primary donors, William and Sara Kimball, and opened in 1991. Ng House was originally opened as the Humanities Theme Residence (aka Humanities House), and was renamed after the Ng family in 2016. The house was completed in 2015 and was the first new undergraduate residence constructed on campus in 20 years. The three-story buildings of Gerhard Casper Quad house approximately 550 students, a mix of underclass and upperclass, in a mix of single rooms, double rooms, and three-person quads.

=== Stern Hall ===
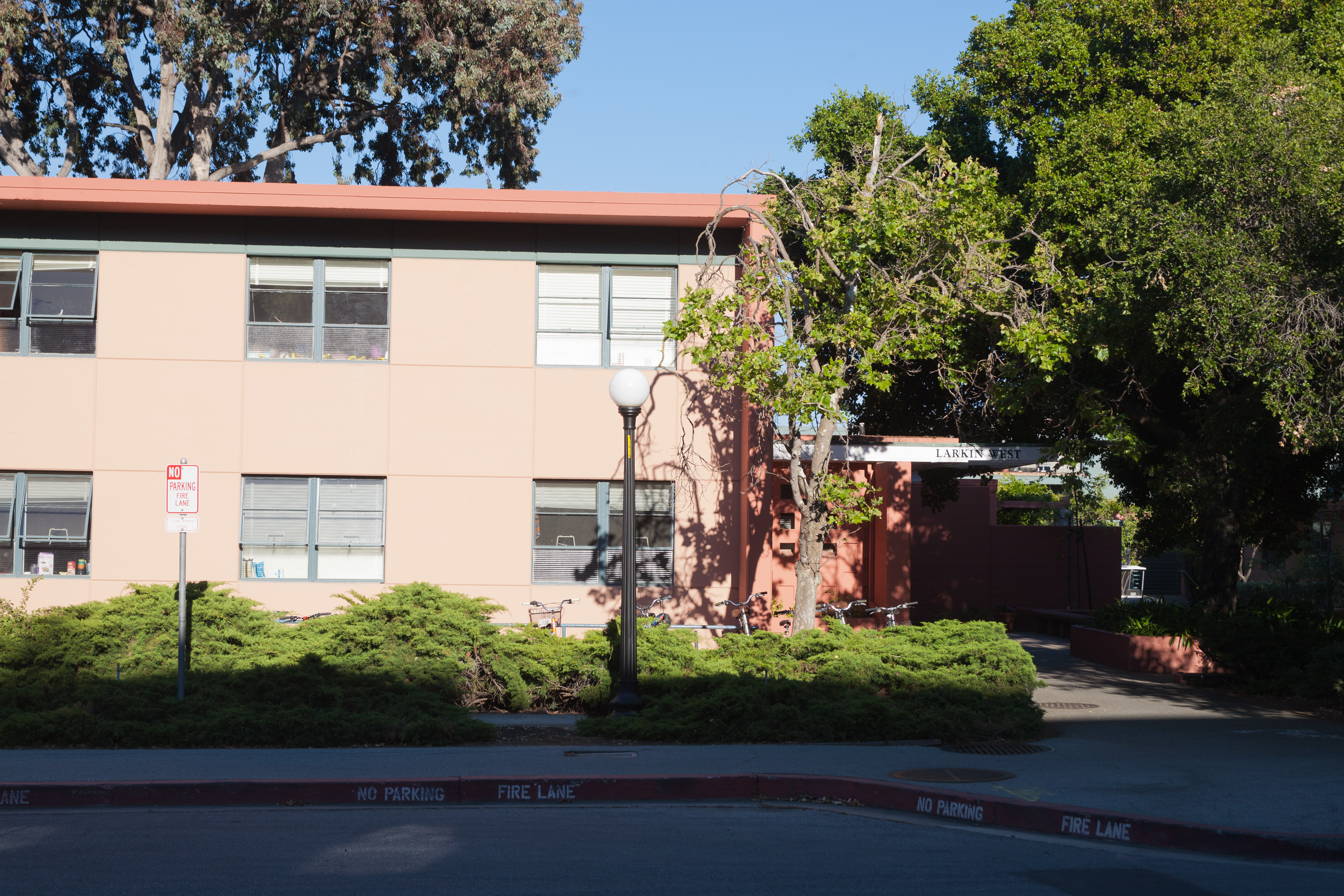
Larkin West in Stern Hall

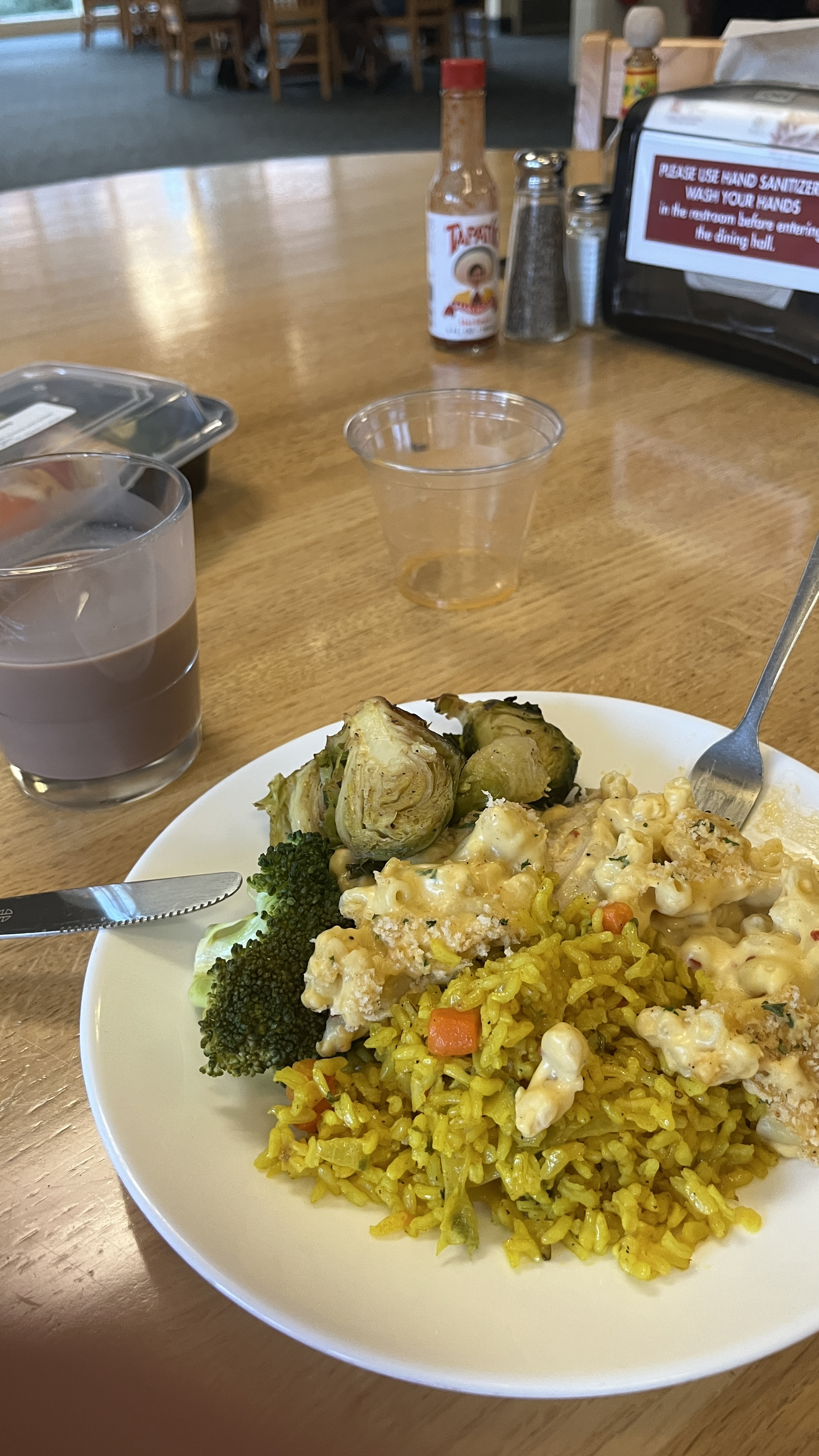
A meal at Stanford University's Stern dining hall in April 2022

Lucie Stern Hall, named for a generous Stanford donor, was built in 1948 and renovated in 1995. Its style represents "Stanford's brief departure into architectural modernism" by not following the usual Stanford pattern of sandstone-colored, arcaded buildings with red tile roofs. It comprises six houses that each accommodate about 100 freshmen. The houses named for California pioneers are Burbank, named for Luther Burbank; Donner; Larkin; Sally Ride named for the Stanford graduate and astronaut (name changed in 2019 from Serra for Junípero Serra); and Twain, named for Mark Twain. The sixth house, originally Muir for John Muir, was renamed Casa Zapata in 1972 and has a Chicano-Latino cross-cultural theme.

=== Toyon Hall ===
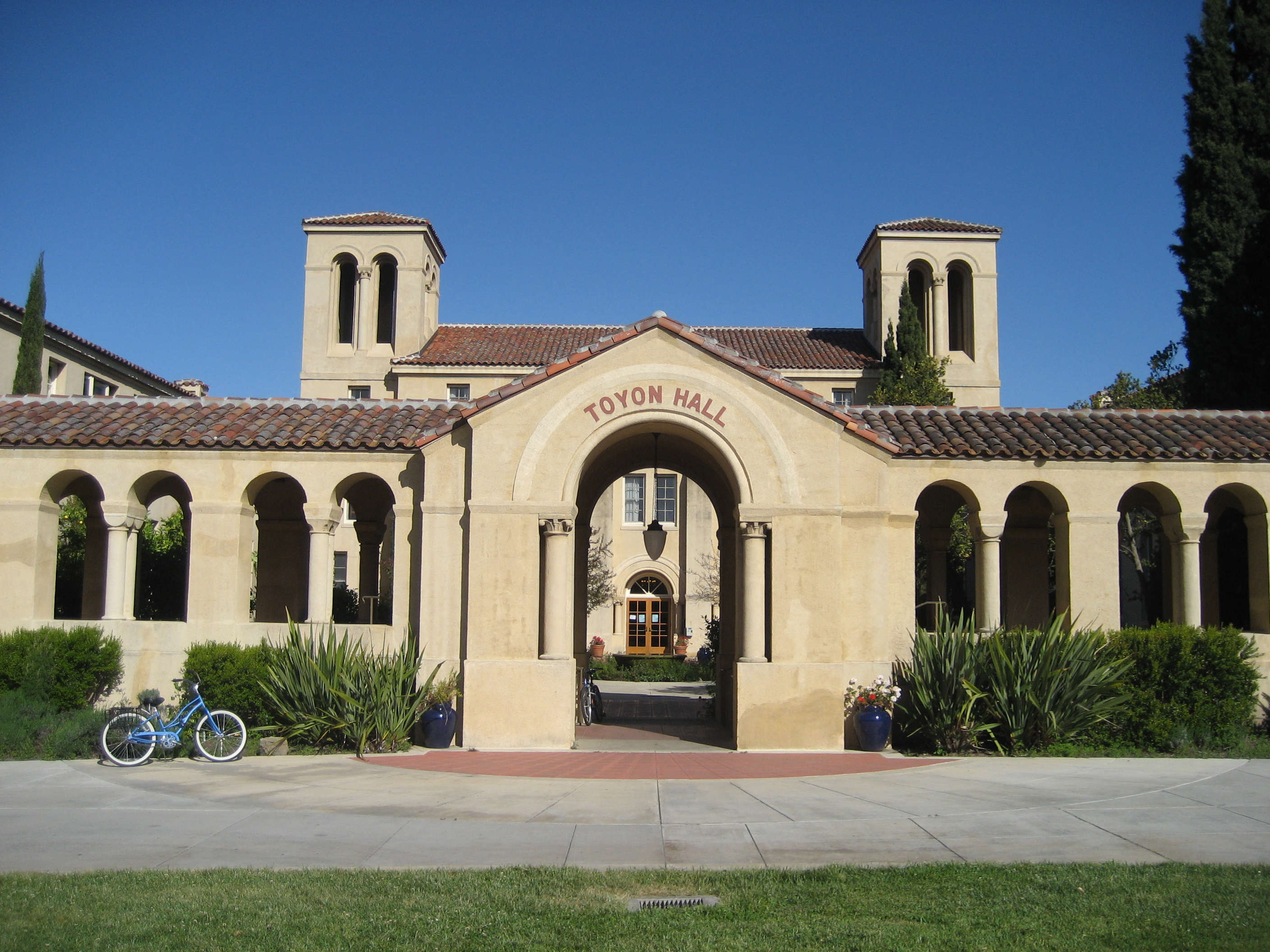
Entrance to Toyon Hall

Toyon Hall is an upperclassman dorm, designed by Bakewell and Brown and built in 1923 to house 150 men. Toyon was the home of the Stanford Eating Clubs, a system of originally all-male organizations which served a social function as well as a food service plan. The eating clubs became co-ed during the 1970s, and the eating club system was abolished in 2009.

=== Wilbur Hall ===
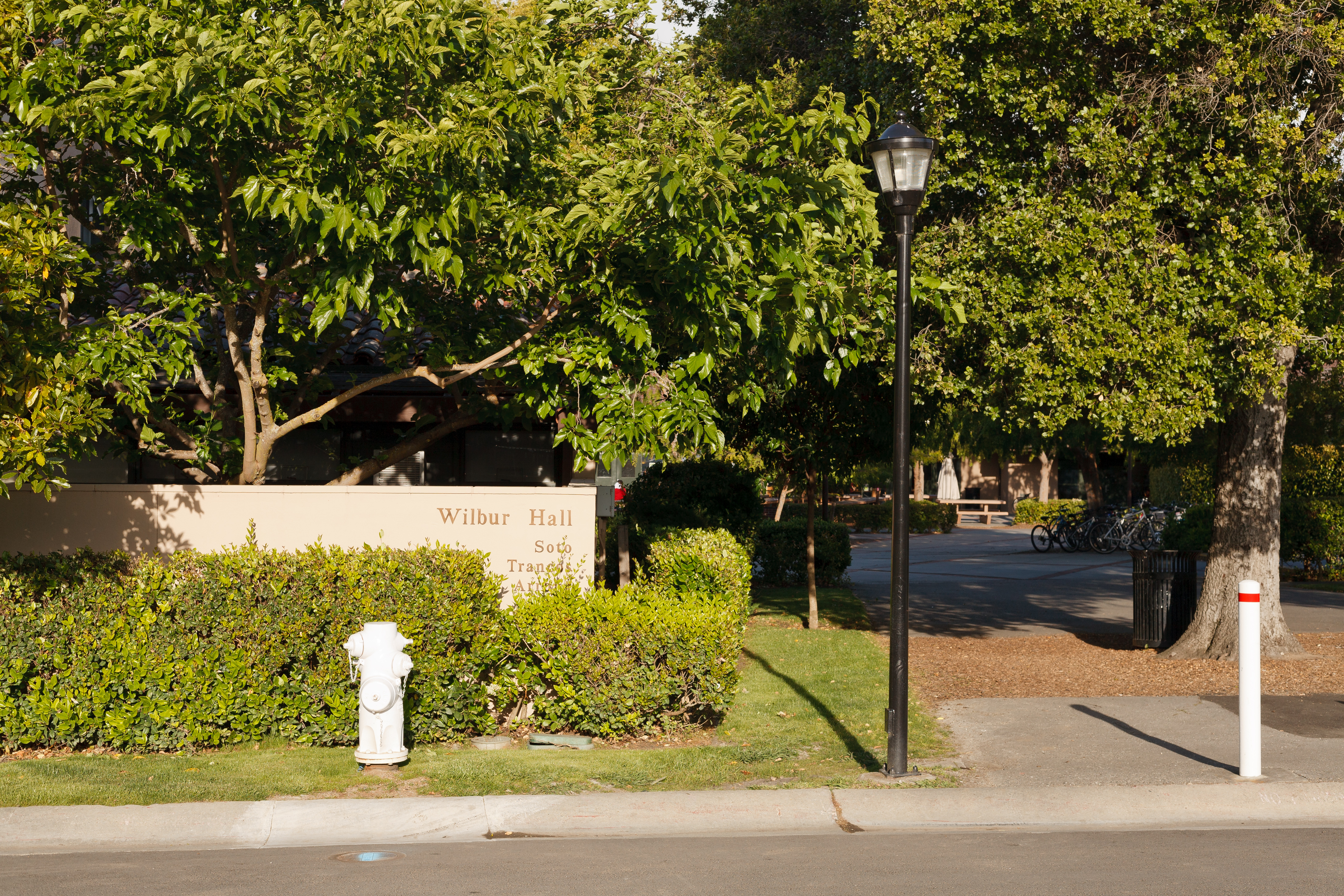
West entrance to Wilbur Hall

Wilbur Hall houses 707 students in eight houses surrounding a common dining complex. It is named for Stanford's third president, Ray Lyman Wilbur. It was built in the late 1940s and represents an architectural departure from Stanford's usual theme of sandstone-colored, arcaded buildings with red tile roofs. Originally built for male students, it is now coed. The houses were named in Spanish. Arroyo means creek. Cedro means cedar but was also the name of a cottage on the Stanford land where Charles Lathrop, Jane Stanford's brother, lived. Junipero means juniper. Otero is small hill in Spanish. Rinconada is named for the local Spanish land grant, Rancho Rinconada del Arroyo de San Francisquito, but, the word also means 'angle'. Soto means thicket. Trancos is for another house that had existed on the Stanford land, Los Trancos Villa; tranco itself means threshold. The last house, Okada, was originally named Madera for another local land grant, Rancho Corte de Madera, but was renamed Okada when it became the Asian American cross-cultural theme house.

While Wilbur Hall has, at times, hosted a mix of upperclassmen and underclassmen, the Wilbur residences are now mostly freshmen dorms; the non-freshman dorms are the four-class Asian American theme house, Okada, the Outdoor House, Otero, and the upperclass only houses Arroyo and Trancos.

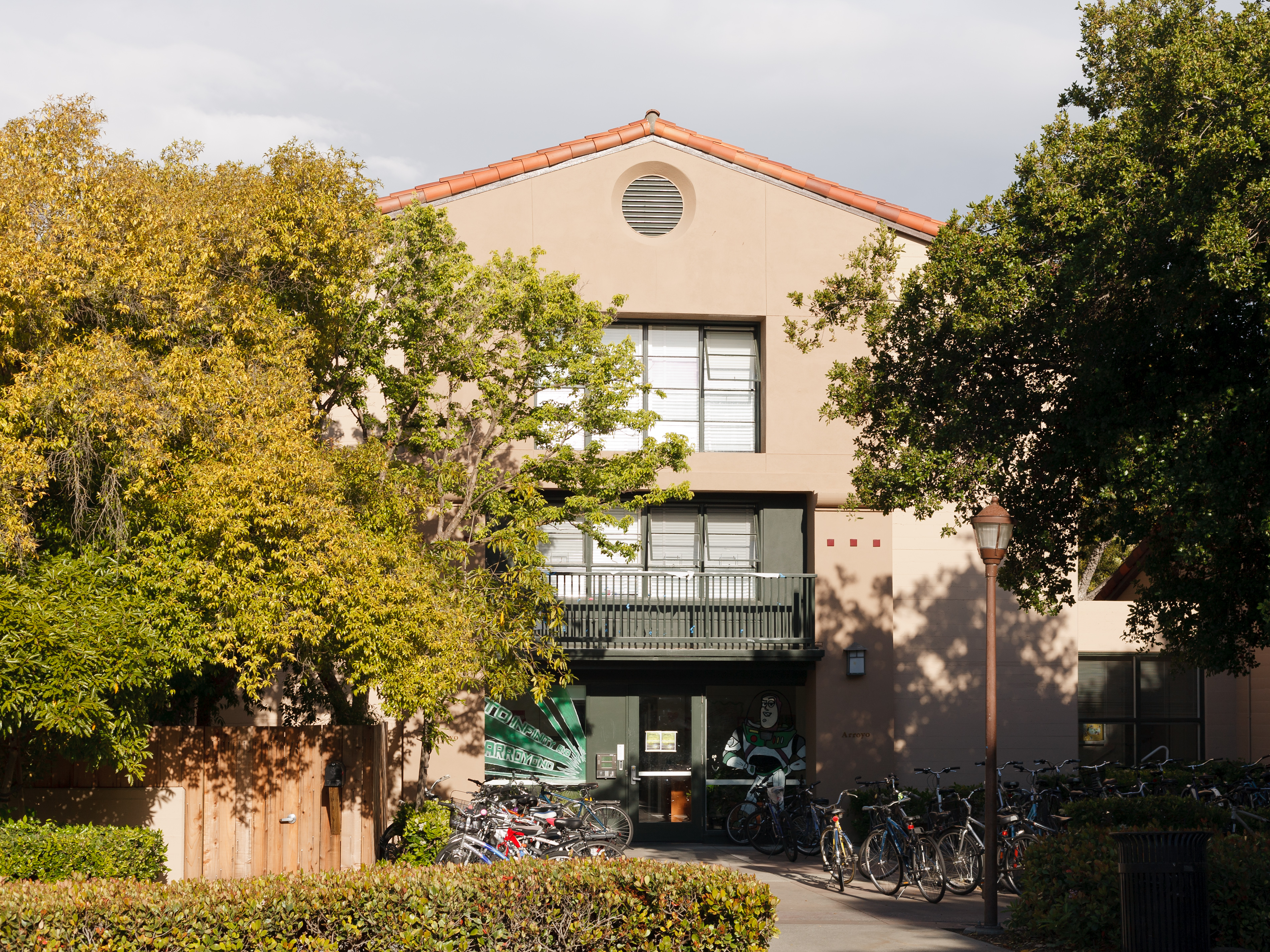
Arroyo

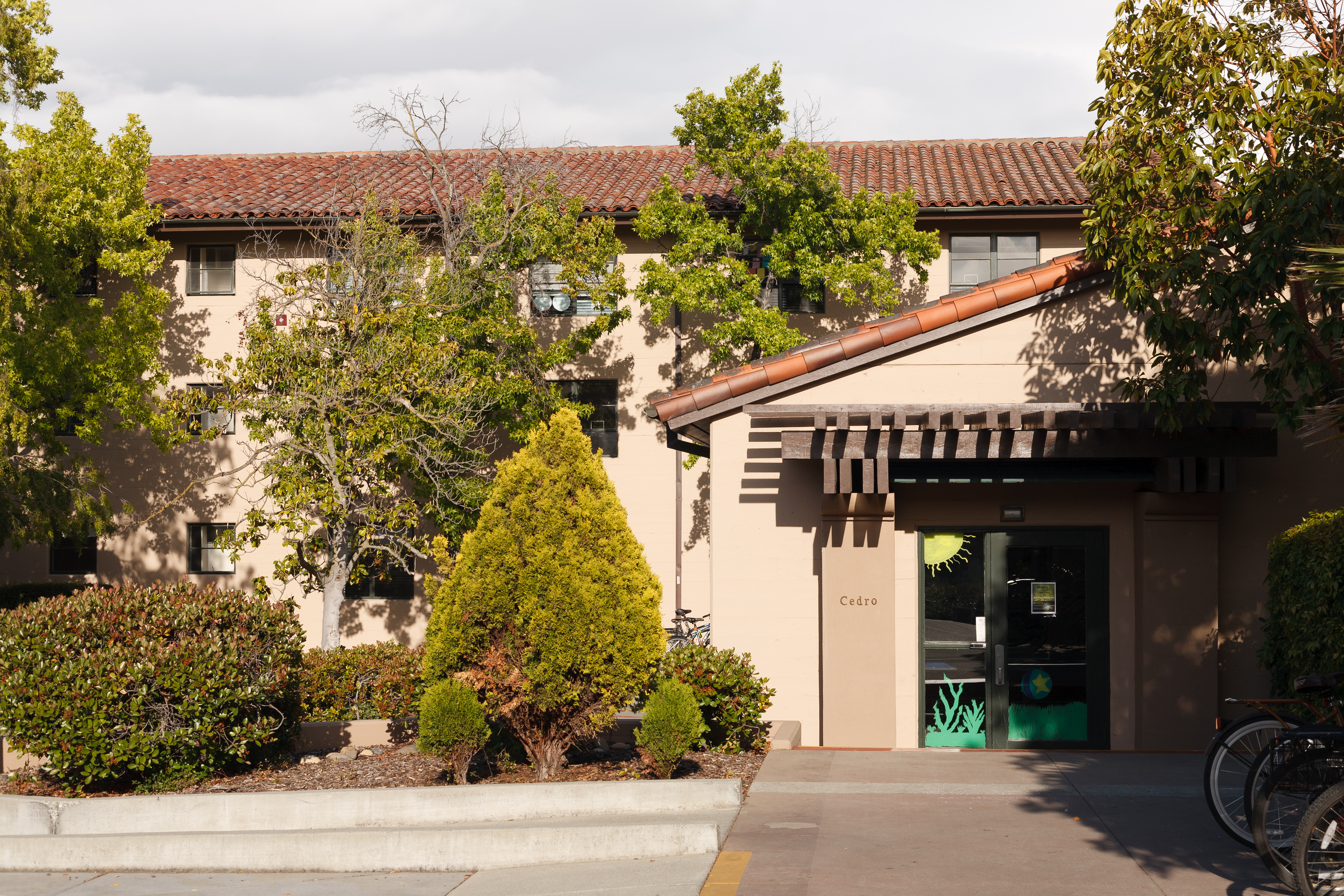
Cedro

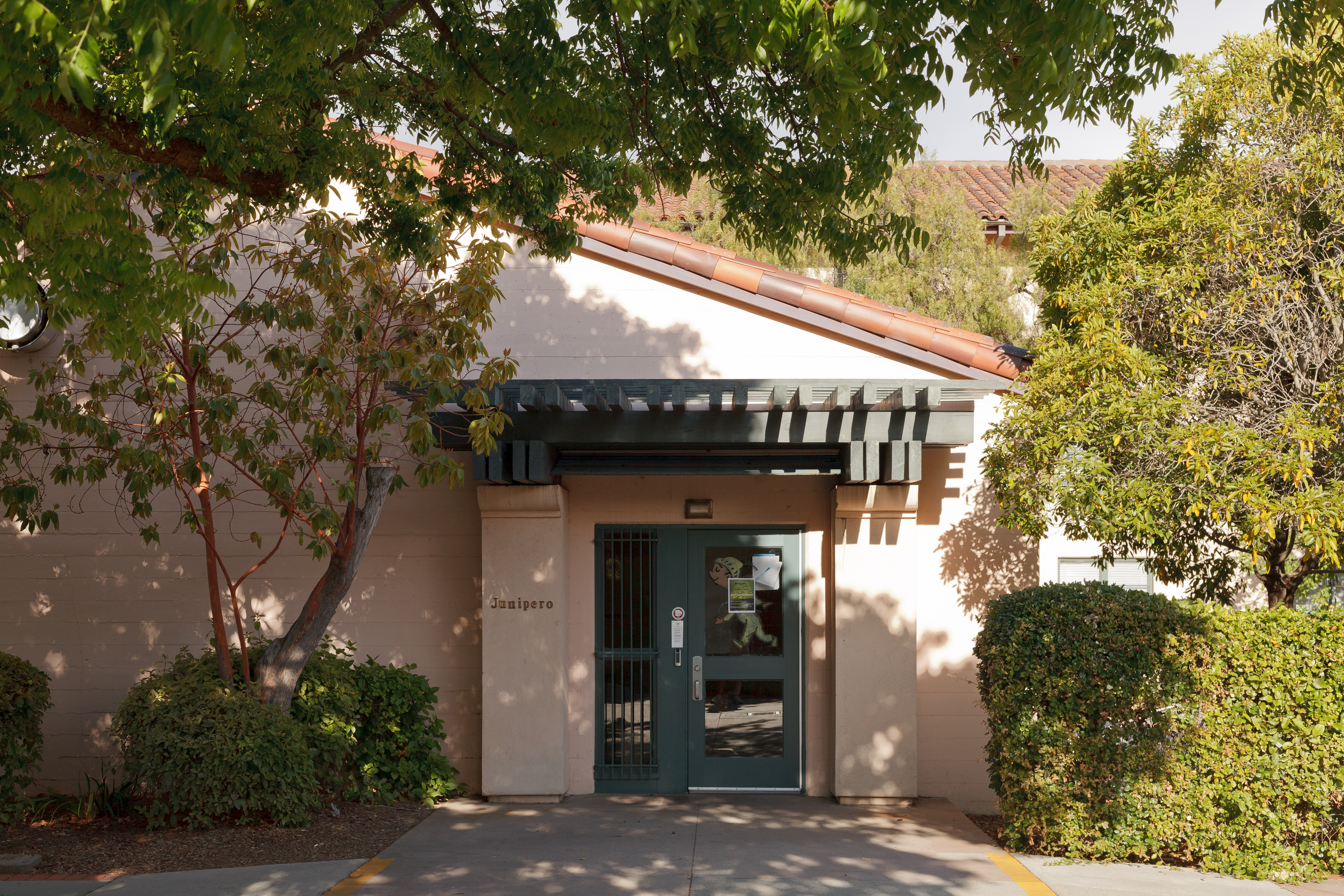
Junipero

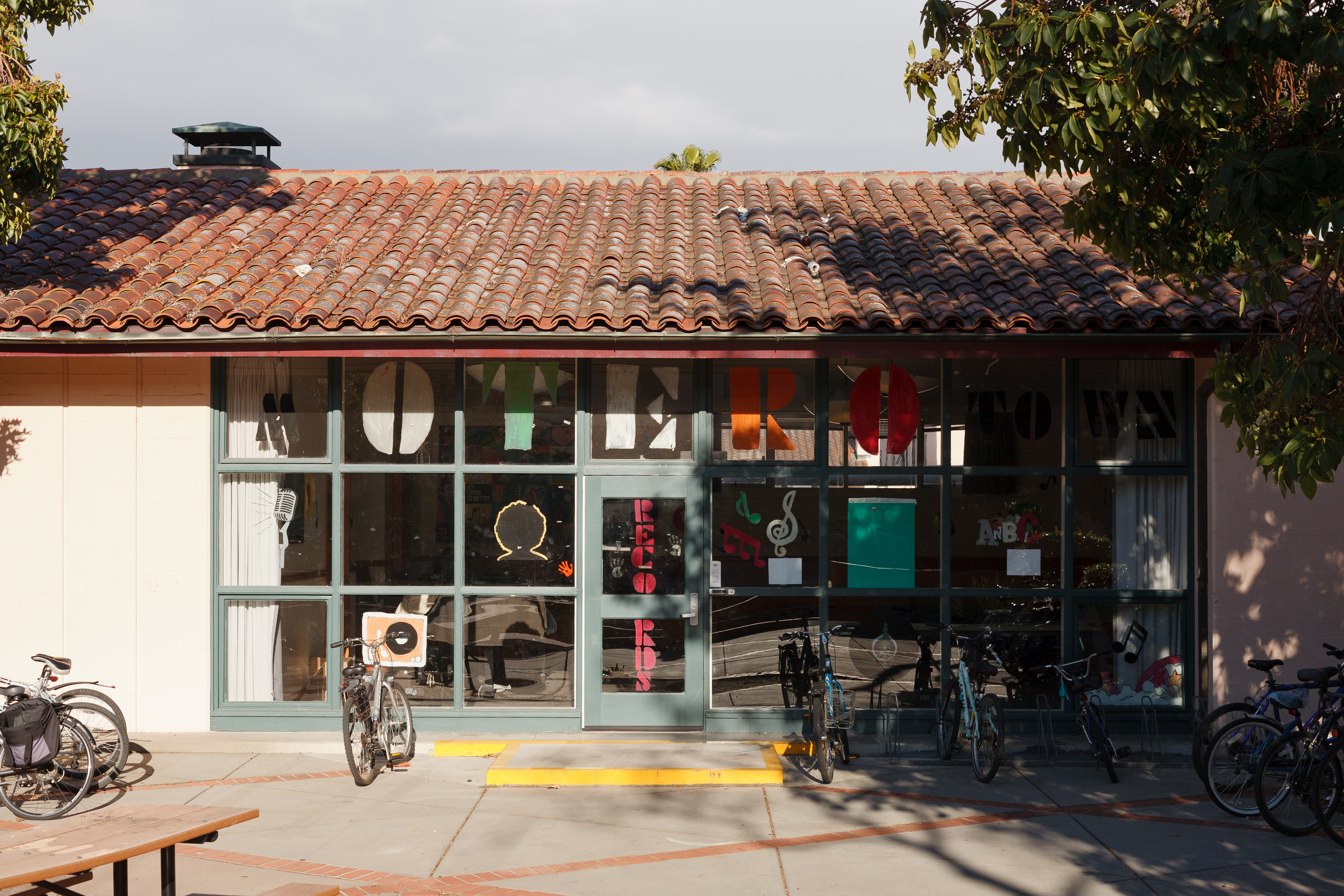
Otero

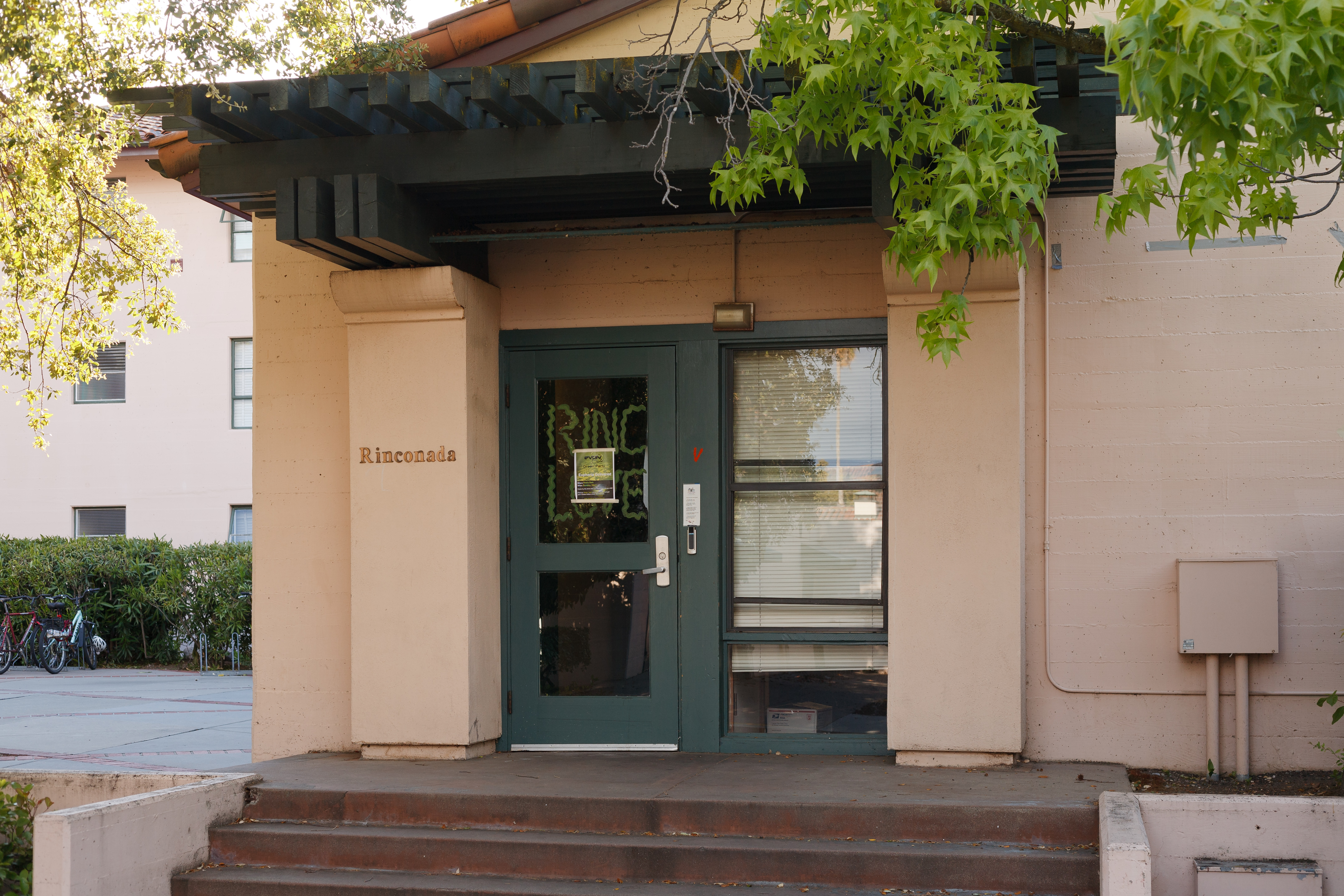
Rinconada

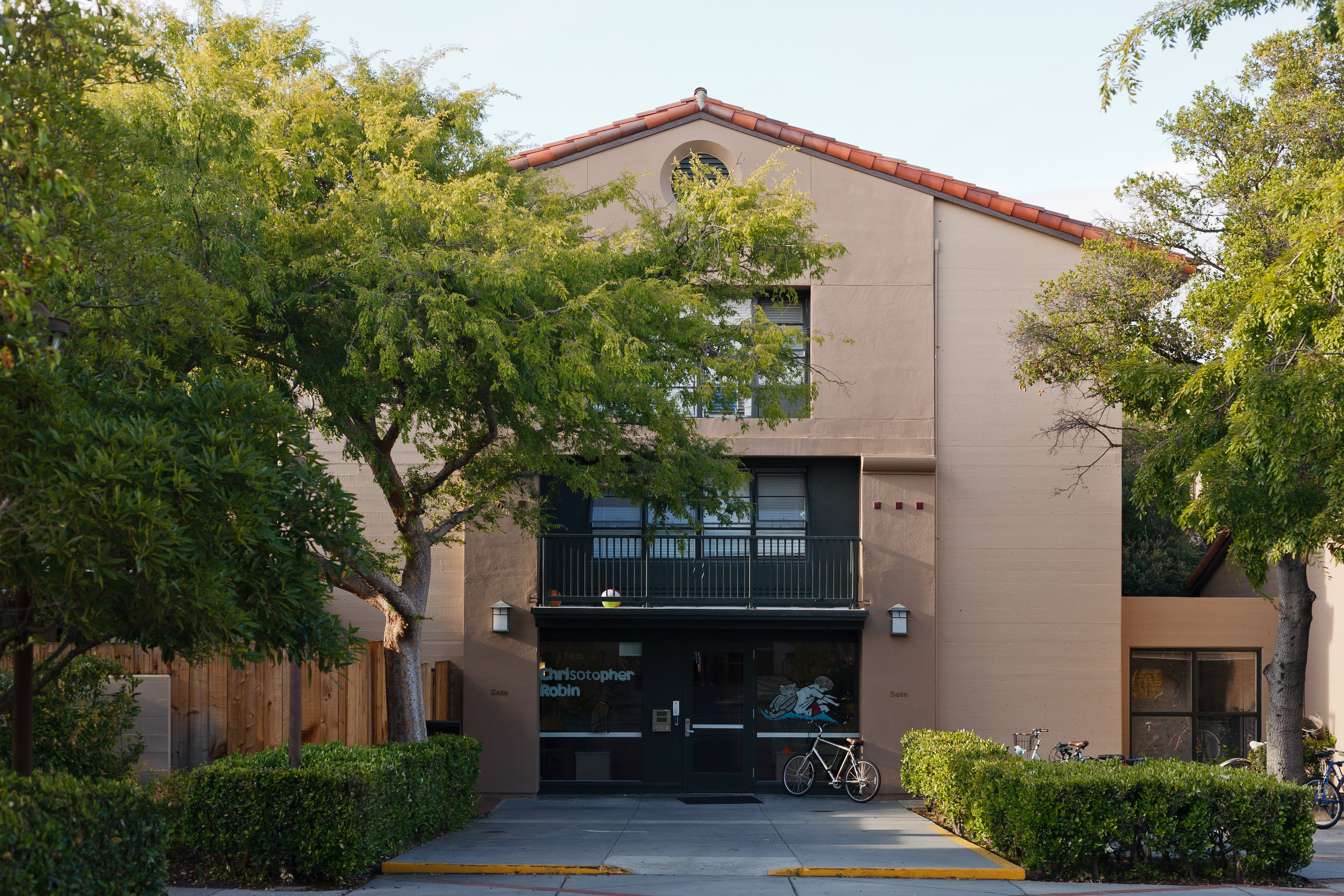
Soto

== West Campus (undergraduate) ==
=== Florence Moore Hall ===
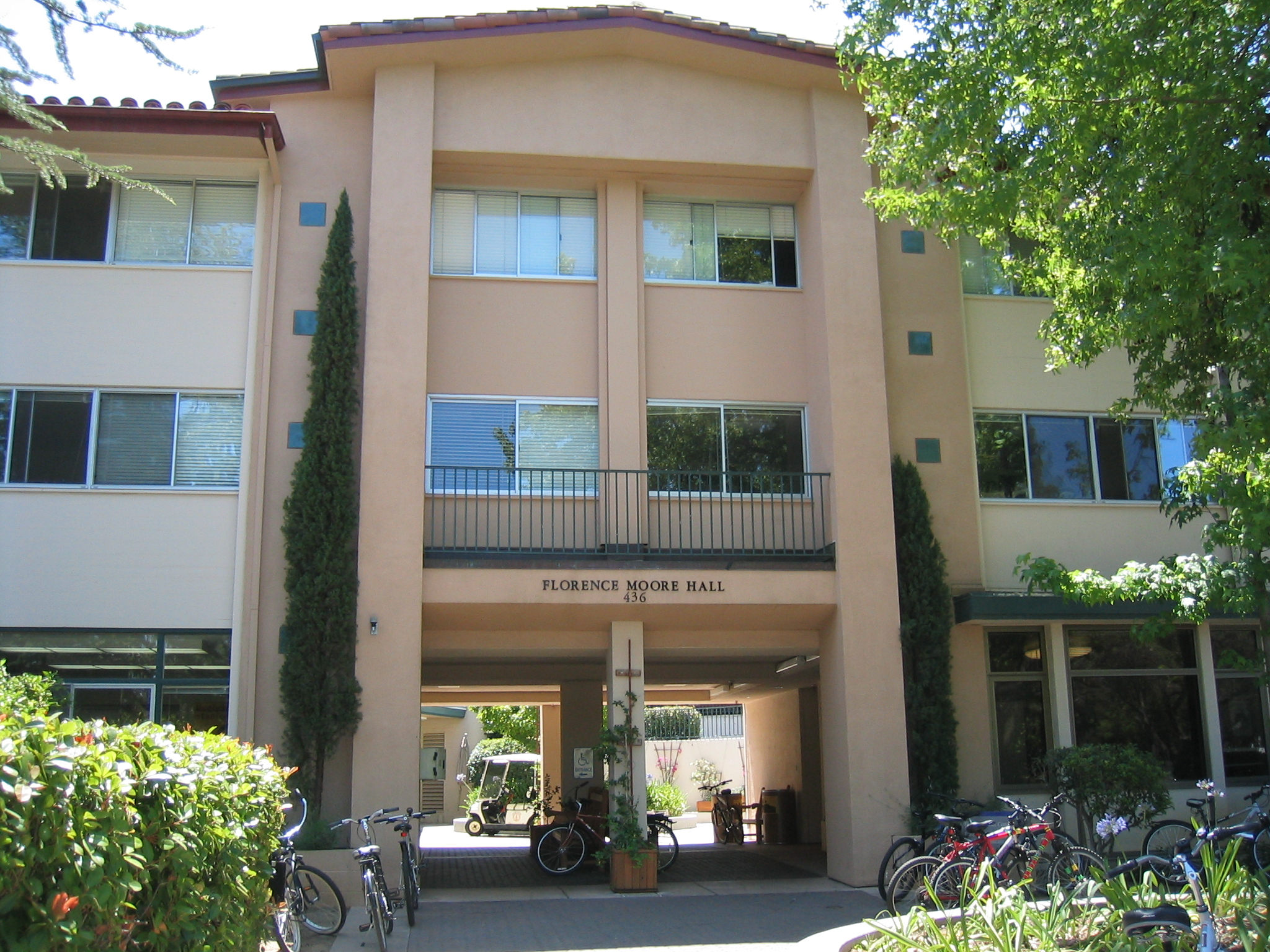
Front of Florence Moore Hall with Alondra on the left and Paloma on the right

Florence Moore Hall, often abbreviated as FloMo, consists of seven different houses: Alondra, Cardenal, Faisan, Gavilan, Loro, Mirlo, and Paloma. It was built in 1956 as a women's dormitory; today all seven buildings are co-ed. Three of the houses are the home of the Structured Liberal Education program.

=== Governor's Corner ===
==== Sterling Quad ====
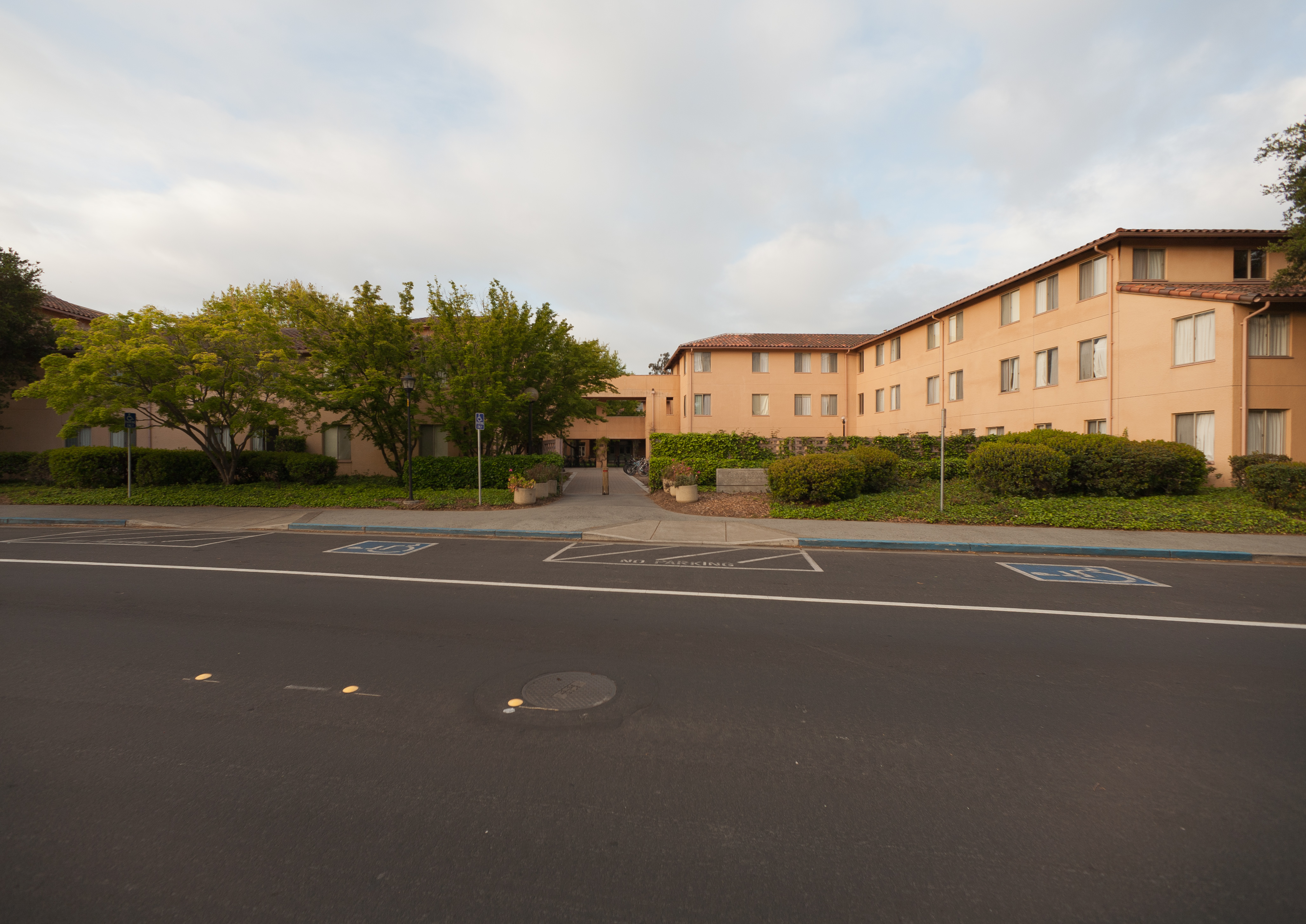
The main entrance to Sterling Quad, from Santa Teresa Street.

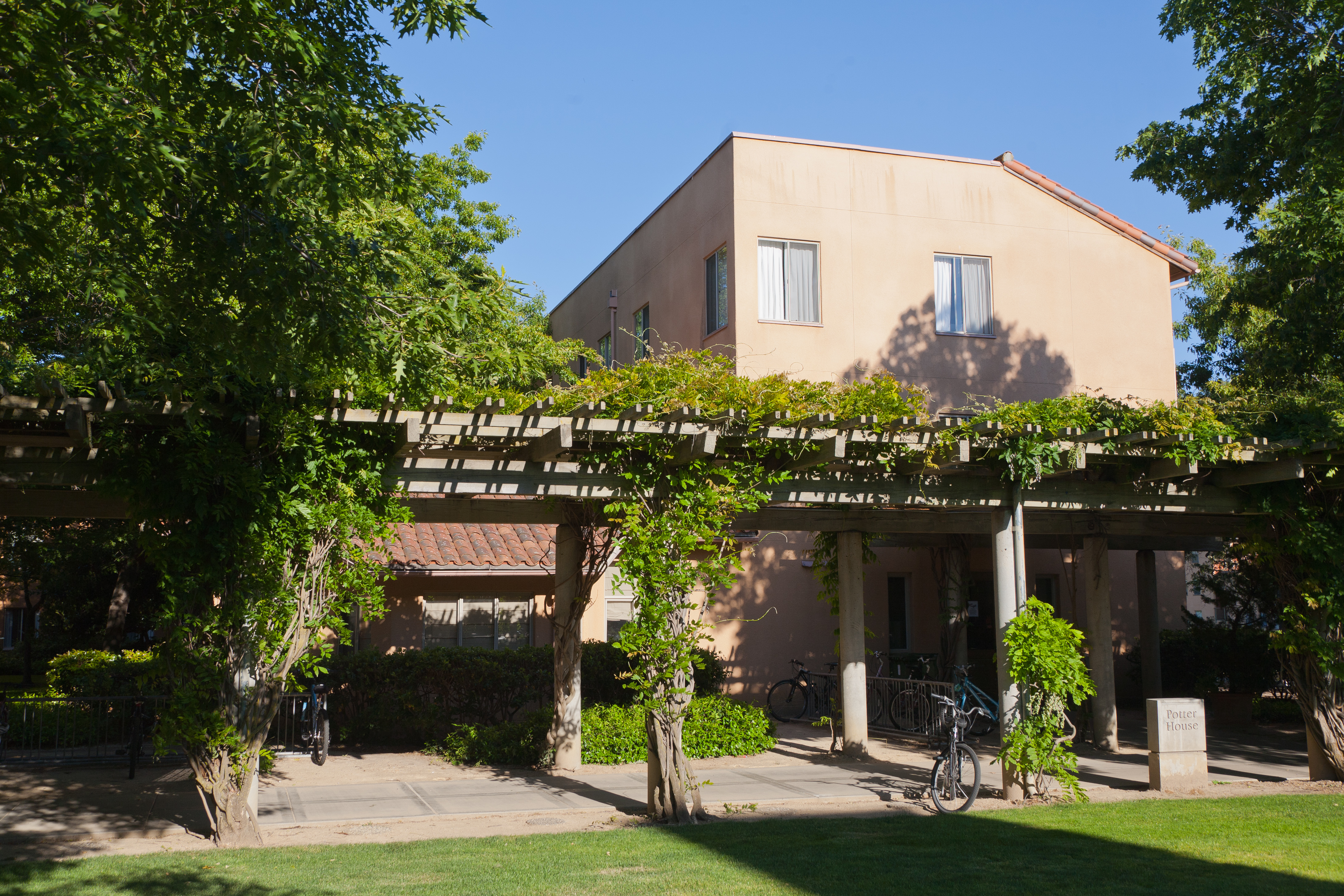
Potter House in Governor's Corner

Sterling Quad was built in 1982-83, making it one of the newest dormitories on campus. It comprises four houses: Adams, Schiff, Robinson, and Potter. The four houses share a dining and performance hall called Ricker Center. Sterling Quad is named for J. E. Wallace Sterling, former president of the University (1949–1968). Adams is named for Ephraim Douglass Adams, a history professor who was also the first chairman of the Hoover Institution Library and Archives. Schiff is named after physics professor Leonard I. Schiff, who was the first chair of the Faculty Senate at Stanford. Potter is named for history professor David M. Potter and Robinson for yet another history professor Edgar Eugene Robinson, who chaired the Independent Study Program, precursor to the present Departmental Honors program.

===== Freshman-Sophomore College =====
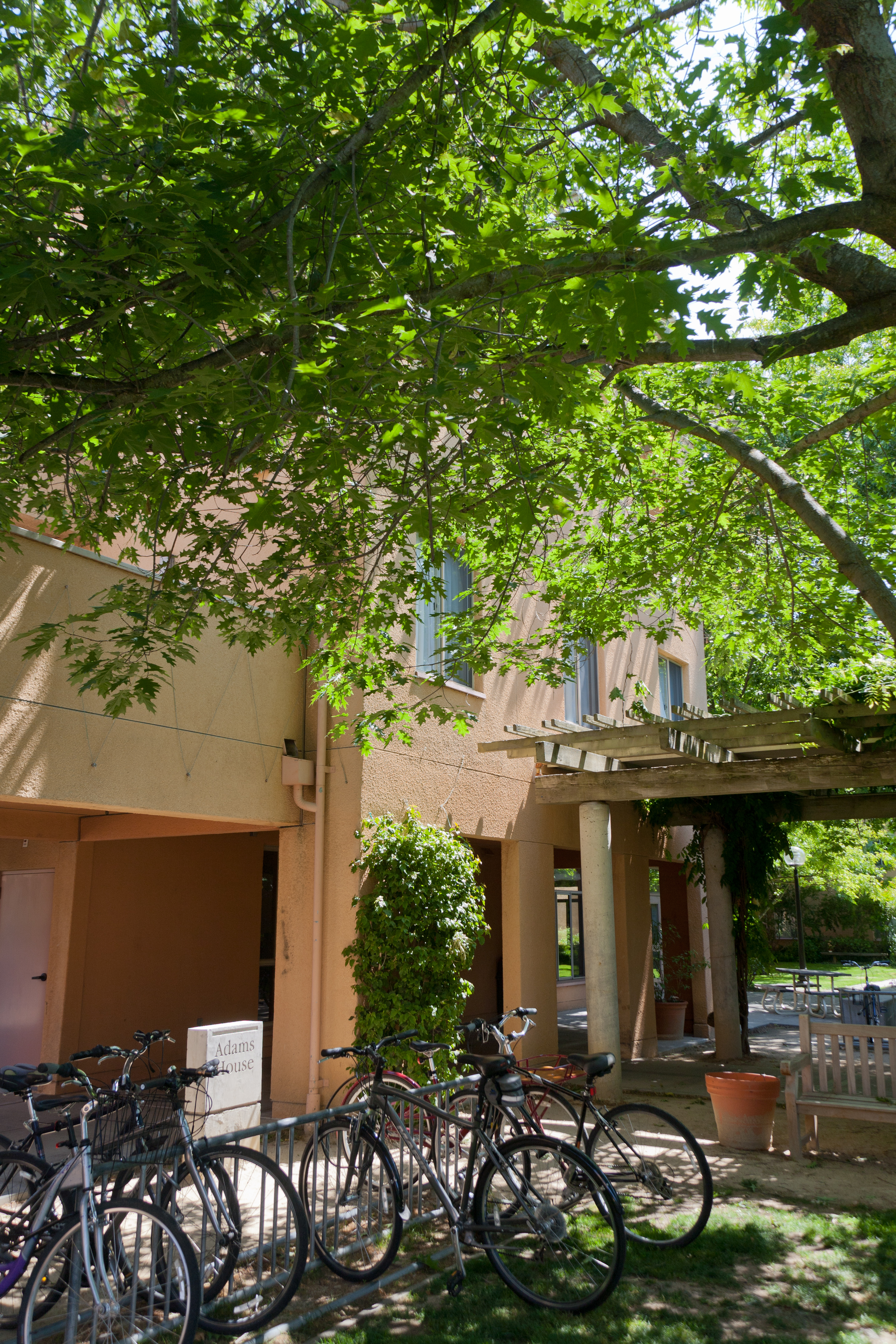
Adams House

From 1999 - 2020, Adams and Schiff formed what was known as the Freshman-Sophomore College (FroSoCo), a two-year residential college. FroSoCo housed approximately 100 freshmen (by application only) and 60 sophomores (choosing to return after living there as freshmen). It attempted to provide "the vibrant residential intellectual community of a small, elite, liberal-arts college while providing enhanced access to the academic resources of one of the world's premier research universities". As a result of Stanford's Neighborhood System, Adams and Schiff have since become independent of each other and each house ~100 freshman and upperclass students in a non-themed environment.

==== Suites ====
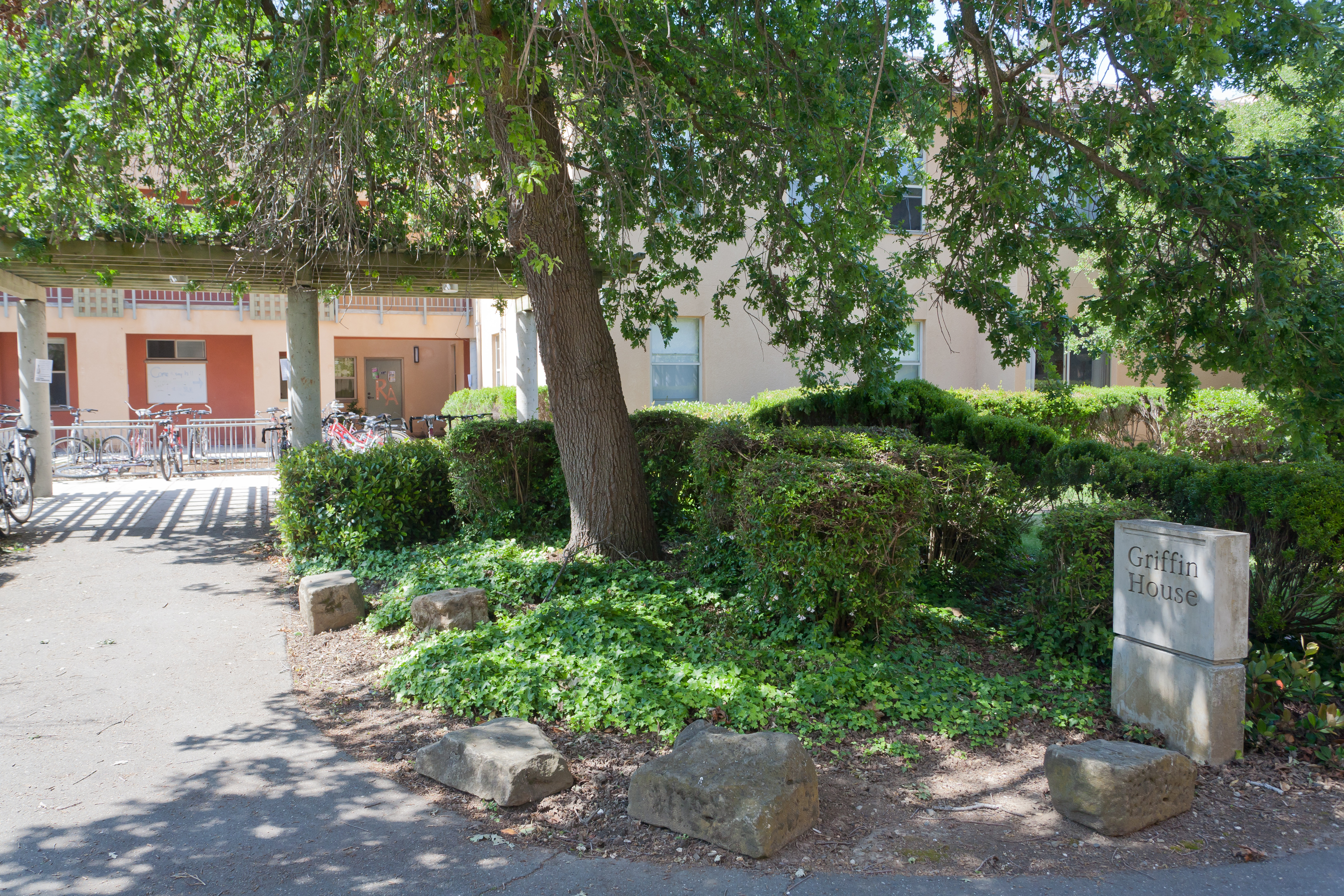
Griffin House

The suites are apartment-style houses for upperclass students and are housed in Anderson, Griffin, Jenkins and Marx (a theme house). The names of the suites honor former Stanford academic leaders and faculty members: Melville Best Anderson, the first head of the English department; James Owen Griffin, who was invited by President Jordan as one of the first faculty; Oliver Peebles Jenkins, first professor of Physiology and Zoology; and Charles David Marx, the first professor of Civil Engineering. Meals for the suites are served in four Dining Clubs: Avanti, Beefeater, Bollard and Middle Earth.

==== Independent houses ====
The independent houses are Yost, Murray, and EAST Houses. EAST is a theme house with an orientation toward teaching and education; the name stands for Education and Society Theme House.

=== Lagunita Court ===
Lagunita Court, usually called "Lag" (pronounced "log"), was built in the 1930s and renovated in 1998. It is named for the adjacent, seasonal lake Lagunita. It originally consisted of six small residential buildings, or "houses", arranged around a central courtyard; the houses were all initially given names of trees in Spanish. These houses are Eucalipto (eucalyptus), Granada (pomegranate) and Adelfa (oleander) on the west side, and Naranja (orange) and Ujamaa (which consists of two buildings formerly named Olivo and Magnolia) on the east. Ujamaa (Swahili for extended family) is the home of the African American theme program and Adelfa has a writing focus. In the autumn of 2016 two new houses were added to the complex: Meier Hall named for Linda and Tony Meier in East Lag and Norcliffe Hall named in honor of the Norcliffe Foundation in West Lag. Originally built for women students, Lag is now coed.

=== Roble Hall ===
Roble Hall, built in 1917 and designed by architect George W. Kelham, is the oldest dormitory at Stanford still in use as a dormitory. It was built as a women's dormitory and later was used exclusively for freshman women; it was converted to a coed residence in 1968.

== The Row ==
The neighborhood called "the Row" is an area that the University subdivided and leased to faculty and Greek organizations to build their own houses. In the subsequent decades, the University terminated leases and acquired ownership of all of the fraternity and sorority chapter houses. These, in addition to houses constructed by the University, today comprise 36 student-managed houses, from the Cowell Cluster to the Lake Houses and all along Mayfield Avenue, with a total population of a little over 1600 students. Houses range in occupancy from 30 to 65. Out of the 35 Row houses, there are seven co-ops in which the students do their own cooking and cleaning (Synergy, Columbae, 576 Alvarado, Hammarskjold, Enchanted Broccoli Forest, Terra, and Kairos), 19 self-ops in which the cooking is done by a hired cook, and nine Greek houses. All of the row houses are owned by the university, the final acquisition being 550 Lasuen in 2023, which was formerly owned by the alumni of the Stanford chapter of the Sigma Chi fraternity.

All Row houses set and collect their own board bills. To accomplish this, a Resident Assistant is selected by the Associate Director on the Row and each Row house has Student Managers (selected by their peers) to oversee the operations of the house. The Assistant Director for Student Management, located in the Row Office, oversees and advises Student Managers. Many of the row houses also have eating associates who are students living elsewhere but choose to participate in a row house.

Student Managers are part of the residence staff leadership team which is coordinated by the Resident Assistant (RA). As a part of the house leadership team they are expected to maintain regular communication with each other, the RA, the residents and to engage residents in the important decisions about house management and the use of house monies.

Many of the Stanford row houses have hosted different organizations throughout the years. What is currently The Warehaus originally housed the Delta Delta Delta sorority and Slavianskii Dom originally housed the Alpha Phi sorority.
