= Roble Hall =

Dormitory at Stanford University

Coordinates: 37.4241°N 122.1745°W

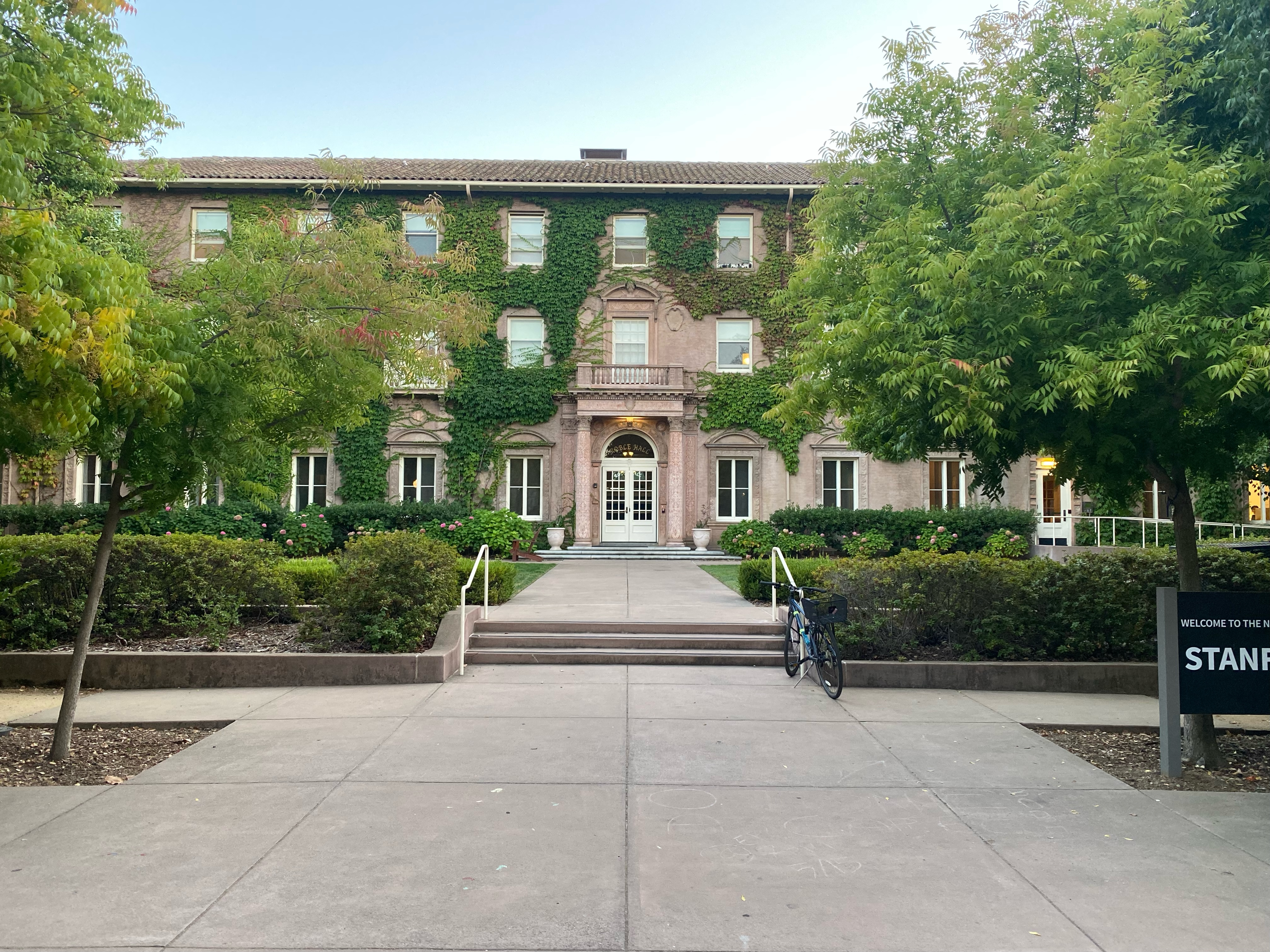
The front entrance of Roble Hall in August 2022

Roble Hall (/roʊbli/) is a dormitory at Stanford University. It was built in 1917 to house women students. It is the oldest dormitory at Stanford that is still in use as a dormitory. It takes its name from the Spanish word for oak tree, although its pronunciation has been anglicized from “robe-leh” to “robe-lee”.

== History ==
Roble Hall was designed by architect George Kelham, who also designed the old San Francisco Public Library in 1917 (now housing the Asian Art Museum of San Francisco). It was considered an architectural jewel of the Beaux-Arts architecture movement. It is three stories high and is built in the shape of an H, with A, B, and Center wings, along with a semi-attached C wing which was added later. Built as a women's dormitory, and later used exclusively for freshmen women, it was converted to a co-ed residence in 1968. Now housing approximately 310 students, it is an upperclassman dorm, but houses mostly seniors due to its number of coveted singles.

The residence underwent an extensive seismic retrofit in 1987-1988, reopening in September 1989, just weeks before the Loma Prieta earthquake, which it survived without damage. Additional retrofitting was performed during the summers of 2006 and 2007.

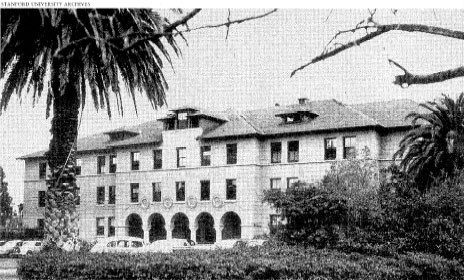
The original Roble Hall in 1891

The original residence for Stanford women was a different building, also named Roble Hall. It was built in haste in 1891 to house the 80 women of the first Stanford undergraduate class. Designed by concrete pioneer Ernest L. Ransome, it survived the 1906 earthquake but was replaced as the women's dormitory by the current Roble Hall in 1918. The original Roble was renamed Sequoia Hall, used as a men’s dormitory until 1957, and demolished in 1996 to make room for the Science and Engineering Quad.
