= Sequoia Hall =

Coordinates: 37.428933°N 122.172050°W

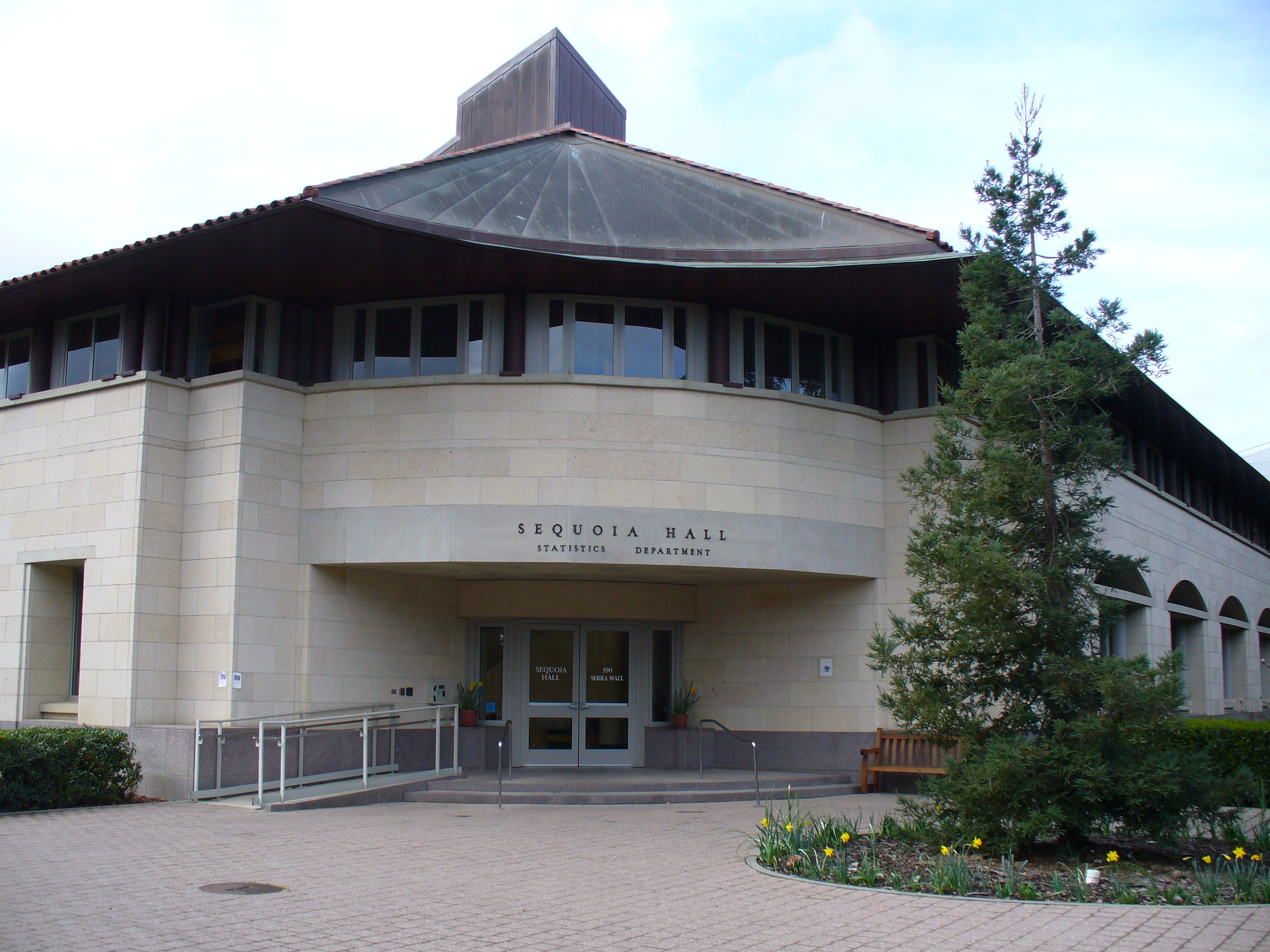
Front Entrance to the new Sequoia Hall, built in 1998.

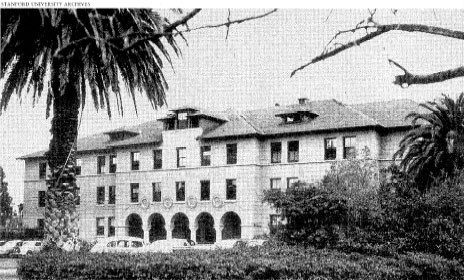
Sequoia Hall in 1891, then named Roble Hall and used as a women's dormitory.

Sequoia Hall is the home of the Statistics Department on the campus of Stanford University in Stanford, California.

== History ==
In 1891, the original building opened as Roble Hall, a three-story women's dormitory. Roble Hall housed the first women admitted to Stanford. In 1917, a new women's dormitory also called Roble Hall was constructed on another part of campus and the earlier building was renamed Sequoia Hall and renovated as a men's dormitory. During World War I, Sequoia Hall was used by the Army for officers attending the War Department civilian defense school.

In the 1930s and 1940s, Sequoia Hall fell into disrepair and was vacant by 1945. In 1957, the building was deemed an earthquake hazard. The top two stories of the building were demolished and the bottom floor was renovated. The renovated building became home to the Statistics Department.

In the late 1980s, Stanford University began planning a $120 million Science and Engineering Quad (SEQ) Project, scheduled to be completed by 1999. Part of this project included the construction of a new building for Statistics. On August 22, 1996, the original Sequoia Hall was demolished to make way for the new facility. The new Sequoia Hall opened January 17, 1998 on an adjacent site. The 14,000-square-foot (1,300 m^{2}) facility is current home to the Statistics Department.
