= On the Situation of Theatre and Cinema =

1977 speech by Bahram Beyzai

- Date: October 12, 1977
- Location: German Cultural Institute, Tehran

"On the Situation of Theatre and Cinema" (Persian: در موقعیت تئاتر و سینما) designates a thirty-minute speech by Bahram Beyzai given in the evening of October 12, 1977 in the premises of the German Cultural Institute, Tehran. A SAVAK report estimated that about eight thousand constituted its audience. The text as well as the voice of this speech was subsequently published numerous times and came to be among the best-known discourses on freedom of speech and censorship in Iran.

The Goethe Poetry Nights of 1977 was held by the Writers' Association of Iran, and Beyzai, as a founding member of the association, delivered this speech on the third night, a rainy Wednesday evening.
