= Tarabnameh =

- Original language: Persian
- Written by: Bahram Beyzai

Premiere
- Date: March 26, 2016
- Place: De Anza College
- Directed by: Bahram Beyzai

Tarabnameh (Persian: طرب‌نامه) is a long musical mazhake by Bahram Beyzai, in which multiple stories are interwoven together in a historical setting. It was written in 1994 and brought to stage in 2016 in two parts. The premiere for the first part was on March 26, 2016, at De Anza College in Cupertino, California.

== Cast ==
- Mojdeh Shamsaie
- Hamid Ehya
- Matin Nasiriha
