= Iranian modern and contemporary art =

A cursory glance at the history of modern and contemporary art in Iran, the social and political developments starting in the 1940s which radically altered the evolution of this country's visual arts.

== History ==
The modern art movement in Iran had its genesis in the late 1940s and early 1950s. This was the period after the death of Persian painter, Kamal-ol-molk (1852–1940) and thus symbolically the end of a rigid adherence to academic painting.

The College of Fine Arts at Tehran University, founded on the model of the Beaux-Arts de Paris and directed by André Godard, served as an important place for students interested in modern art, by proposing a radically different teaching style from that of Kamal-ol-Molk, encouraging original creation rather than copying international masters although the lack of qualified teachers was holding back this development.

The 1949 opening of the Apadana gallery in Tehran by Mahmoud Javadipour and other colleagues, and the emergence of artists like Marcos Grigorian in the 1950s, signaled a commitment to the creation of a form of modern art grounded in Iran. Grigorian found influence for his art in popular Iranian culture, specifically a coffee-house storyteller culture and the visual language of dry earth and mud.

One of Grigorian's students at the College of Decorative Arts (now Tehran University of Art) was Hossein Zenderoudi, who under the influence of Parviz Tanavoli, was interested in the forms and aesthetics of objects made for Shi'a Islam worship. The scholar Karim Emami likened his art and his teacher, Tanavoli, to the kind of objects found in saqqakhanas, coining term, the "Saqqakhaneh school".

He also won an honorary diploma in handicrafts from Bangalore, India, from the Asian Cultural Exchange. His oil paintings have been exhibited in the Exhibition at the Persepolis Gallery at the Shiraz Art Festival.

Modern Iranian art also saw the increasing integration of calligraphy and painting. Artists such as Sadegh Barirani,Mohammad Ehsai and Reza Mafi explored the visual possibilities of Persian script, developing approaches influenced by the formal language of the Saqqakhaneh movement.

=== Saqqakhaneh movement ===
In the 1950 and 1960s, a new subgenre of Iranian art called the Saqqakhaneh school (also known as Saqqā-ḵāna, Saqqa-khaneh, Saqakhaneh, Sahakhanah) was pioneered by artists Parviz Tanavoli, Hossein Zenderoudi, Faramarz Pilaram, Massoud Arabshahi, Mansoor Ghandriz, Nasser Ovissi, Sadegh Tabrizi and Jazeh Tabatabai. Artists associated with Saqqakhaneh successfully combined western art stylistic traditions and local symbols including calligraphy, zodiac signs, astrolabes, amulets and talismans in order to devise a distinctly local visual language. Religious motifs, such as the hand or a bowl, also featured prominently in Saqqakhaneh works.

Saqqakhaneh school is a movement of neo-traditional modern art that is found in Iran, rooted in a history of coffee-house paintings and Shiʿite Islam visual elements. The word Saqqakhaneh originally referred to a type of water-fountain shrine found locally, and came to represent a movement characterised heavily by symbolism. Other motifs found throughout the region were incorporated into the artistic movement – the hand being a prime example. In scholar Karim Emami's articles on “Saqqā-ḵāna Paintings,” he defined in which a, "combined religious imagery and traditional decorative elements with modern painting techniques, played a significant role in drawing the attention of the media and art connoisseurs to the genre". A visual language was created by drawing on the history of the Shi'a Islamic culture, specifically the saqqakhana, a small public area in which water is given to strangers often decorated with symbols and offerings. The artists of this genre were re-appropriating these symbolic traditions associated with the saqqakhana but with a modernist stance.

By the late 1960s into the 1970s he Saqqakhaneh school artists of Iran had international prominence and this helped pave the way for the opening of the Tehran Museum of Contemporary Art in 1977. The Tehran Museum of Contemporary Art boasting an important collection of both Western and Iranian artists. The Iranian revolution by 1979 halted the dynamics of the Iranian arts scene.

It has been debated by various scholars after the publication of Edward Said's 1978 book Orientalism (which posed similar questions), was the Saqqakhaneh movement affected by the postcolonial view of Iran or rather, did it intensify Orientalism.

In 2013, Layla S. Diba and Fereshteh Daftari co-curated the exhibition, Iran Modern (2013) shown at the Asia Society in New York City. The exhibition was the first major exhibition of modern art from Iran, featuring 26 artists which included Ahmad Aali, Abbas, Massoud Arabshahi, Siah Armajani, Sadegh Barirani, Mohammad Ehsai, Monir Shahroudy Farmanfarmaian, Mansour Ghandriz, Marcos Grigorian, Ghasem Hajizadeh, Nahid Hagigat, Bahman Jalali, Rana Javadi, Reza Mafi, Leyly Matine-Daftary, Ardeshir Mohassess, Bahman Mohassess, Nicky Nodjoumi, Houshang Pezeshknia, Faramarz Pilaram, Behjat Sadr, Abolghassem Saidi, Sohrab Sepehri, Parviz Tanavoli, Mohsen Vaziri-Moqaddam, Manoucher Yektai, and Hossein Zenderoudi. The exhibition was divided into sections including Saqqakhaneh and neotraditional art styles influenced by folk art history, abstract art, and calligraphy.

Saqqakhaneh artists’ fascination with signs and talismans has recently moved beyond avantgarde art and found its way into women's fashion where its motifs are used in scarves, shawls, shirts and the like.

=== Naqqashikatt ===
Art movements, such as Saqqakhaneh, were significant precursors to the school of calligraphic painting. In Iran, the calligraphic art movement was known as Naqqashi-Katt (or Naqqashikatt). It was one of a number of art movements that emerged across the Middle East in the mid-20th century. Although these groups of artists emerged independently across North Africa and the Middle East, the common thread was that each searched for ways to integrate tradition and modernity in a way that would contribute to a distinctive local visual language. Each of these groups went by a different labels at the local level.

In Jordan, the movement emerged in the 1950s and was known as Hurufiyya while in Iraq, the movement was known as Al-Bu'd al-Wahad (One Dimension Group). The movement was known as the Old Khartoum School in Sudan, where artists rejected Western art traditions and focused on Islamic calligraphy, West African motifs and local traditions in the pursuit of indigenous compositions.

== Photography in Iran ==
Although photography was introduced to Iran in the mid-19th century during the Qajar era, it was not until the late 20th century that it became widely recognized as a legitimate and expressive medium within Persian visual arts. The development of artistic photography in Iran has reflected the country’s complex social, political, and cultural transitions, evolving from traditional documentary styles into more experimental and conceptual practices.

In the post-revolution era after 1979, a new wave of Iranian photographers began to explore themes such as identity, gender, censorship, tradition versus modernity, and emotional introspection. Artistic photography became a powerful tool to navigate and reflect upon contemporary Iranian life, often marked by symbolic imagery, minimalistic aesthetics, and poetic ambiguity.

Among the most internationally acclaimed figures is Shadi Ghadirian, whose series Qajar and Like Every Day comment on the status of women by juxtaposing traditional imagery with modern objects. Newsha Tavakolian blends photojournalism with staged documentary forms to portray youth, resistance, and emotional life in Iran. Another emerging conceptual photographer, Mahdiyeh Afshar Bakeshloo, focuses on inner emotional states such as solitude, grief, and ambiguity through stark black-and-white compositions that blend the human form with everyday objects.

== List of notable artists in Iranian modern art ==
=== Early Iranian modern artists (1940s) ===
- Ahmad Esfandiari
- Marcos Grigorian
- Javad Hamidi
- Shokouh Riazi
- Mohsen Vaziri-Moghaddam
- Jalil Ziapour

=== Modern artists of the second wave (1950s–1960s) ===
- Bahram Alivandi
- Mir Abdolrez Daryabeigi
- Monir Shahroudy Farmanfarmaian
- Mahmoud Farshchian
- Abbas Katouzian
- Leyly Matine-Daftary
- Behjat Sadr
- Manoucher Yektai
- Noureddin Zarrinkelk

=== Saqqakhaneh movement artists (1950s–1960s) ===
- Massoud Arabshahi
- Mohammad Ehsai
- Mansoor Ghandriz
- Morteza Momayez
- Nasser Ovissi
- Faramarz Pilaram
- Sadegh Tabrizi
- Parviz Tanavoli
- Hossein Zenderoudi
- Talieh Kamran

=== Later modern artists (1970s to present-day) ===
- Abbas (photographer)
- Reza Abedini, designer
- Shirin Aliabadi
- Ali Akbar Sadeghi
- Aydin Aghdashloo
- Kamrooz Aram
- Siah Armajani
- Morteza Avini
- Jamal Bakhshpour
- Shahin Charmi
- Bijan Daneshmand
- Reza Deghati
- Shahram Entekhabi
- Rokni Haerizadeh
- Parastou Forouhar, installation artist
- Shadi Ghadirian, photographer
- Behrouz Gharibpour, theatre director, Hans Christian Andersen Award (2002)
- Kaveh Golestan
- Barbad Golshiri
- Gita Hashemi
- Maryam Hashemi
- Khosrow Hassanzadeh, painter
- Taraneh Hemami, fine artist
- Shirazeh Houshiary, Turner Prize nominee
- Pouran Jinchi
- Y.Z. Kami
- Iman Maleki, painter
- Sanaz Mazinani
- Farhad Moshiri
- Shirin Neshat, contemporary photographer
- Nicky Nodjoumi, fine artist
- Mina Nouri painter, printmaker
- Hossein Nuri painter, dramaturge, filmmaker
- Eric Parnes, painter
- Mohammad Radvand
- Tarlan Rafiee
- Jalil Rasouli
- Jahangir Razmi, winner of the Pulitzer Prize
- Bahram Kalhornia painter, graphic artist
- Reza Khodadadi
- Mehdi Saeedi
- Homayoun Salimi
- Marjane Satrapi
- Daryush Shokof
- Keyvan Shovir
- Mitra Tabrizian
- Sadegh Tirafkan
- Alfred Yaghobzadeh

== See also ==
- Persian art
- Persian culture
- Intellectual movements in Iran
- Iranian cinema
- List of Iranian artists
- List of Iranian painters
- List of Iranian women artists
