= Layla S. Diba =

Iranian-American art historian and curator

Layla Diba
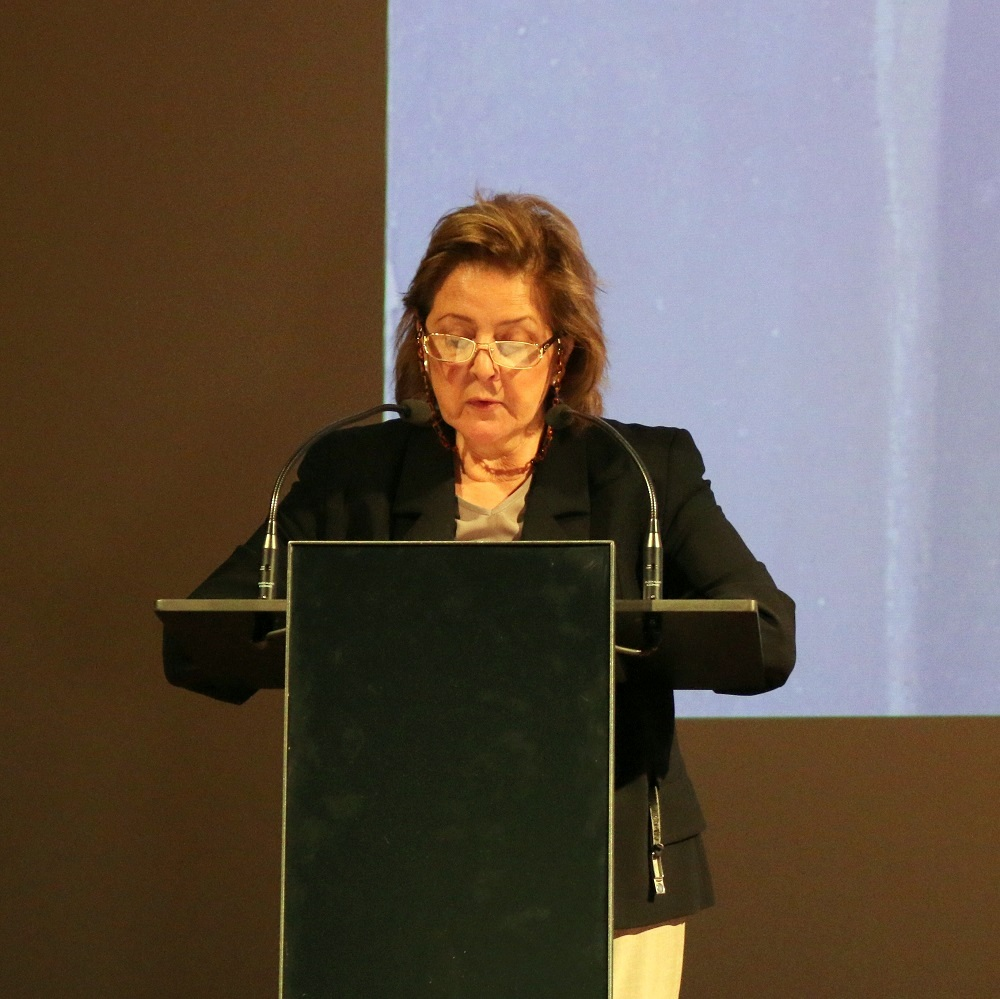
- Layla Diba in a Qajar art conference at Louvre Museum in 2018
- Born: Layla Soudavar
- Occupations: Scholar, curator, art historian, art advisor
- Spouse: Mahmoud T. Diba

Academic background
- Education: Wellesley College, New York University Institute of Fine Arts
- Thesis: Lacquerwork of Safavid Persia and Its Relationship to Persian Painting (1994)
- Doctoral advisor: Priscilla Parsons Soucek

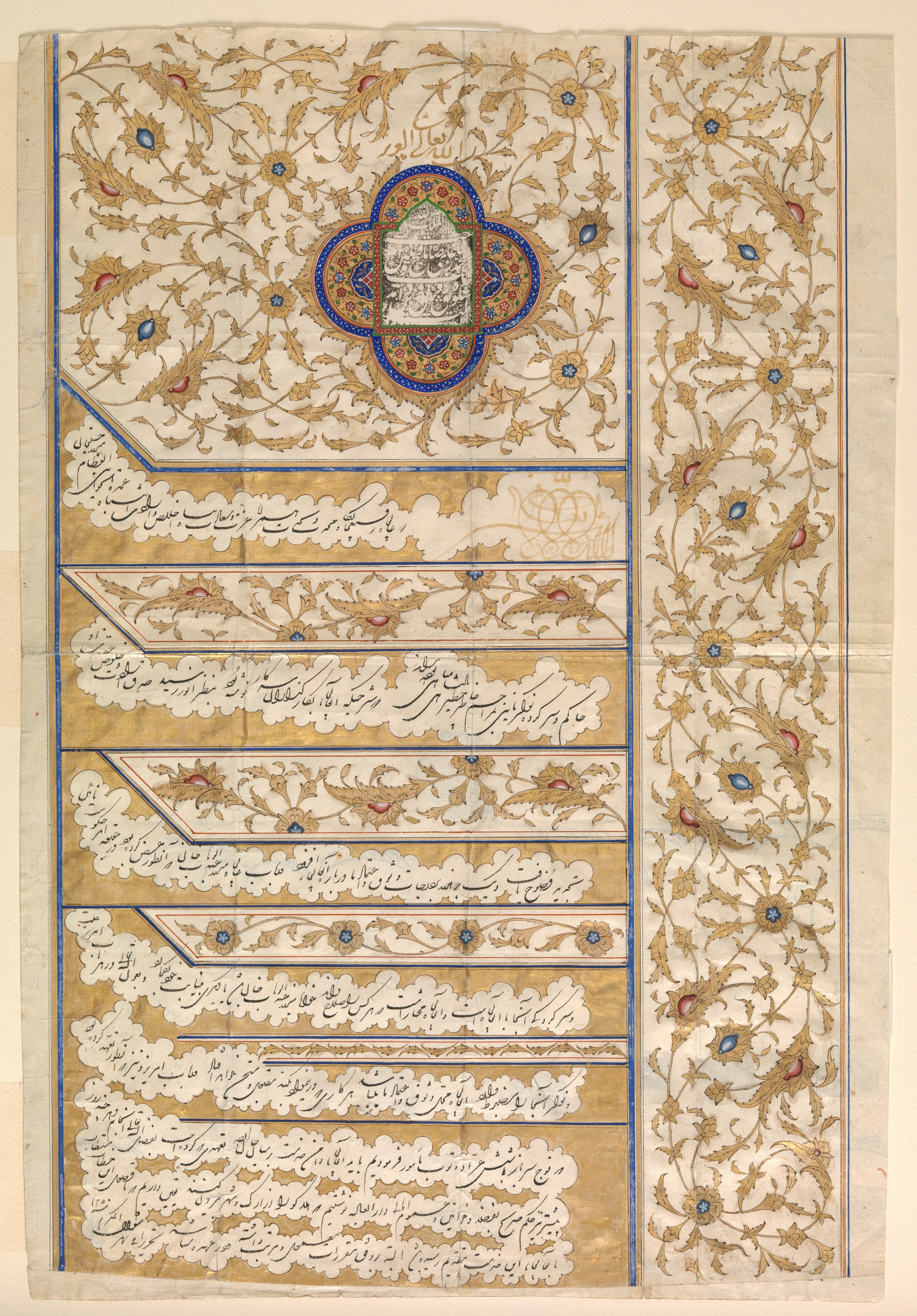
Firman [royal mandate] of Persian king Muhammad Shah Qajar, Gift of Layla S. Diba, in memory of Mahmoud T. Diba, to the Metropolitan Museum of Art

Layla Soudavar Diba (Persian: لیلا سودآور-دیبا) is an Iranian-American independent scholar of art history and curator. She specializes in 18th/19th-century and contemporary Persian art and the Qajar period. She has curated various exhibitions, such as the Royal Persian Paintings: The Qajar Epoch 1783-1925 (1998 to 1999) exhibition at the Brooklyn Museum, and co-curated Iran Modern (2013) alongside Fereshteh Daftari at New York City's Asia Society.

== Early life and education ==
Layla S. Diba was born as Layla Soudavar. She arrived in New York City in 1979. She is related to Farah (née Diba) Pahlavi, the former Shahbanu (Empress) of Iran.

Diba holds a B.A. degree from Wellesley College, and a M.A. degree and Ph.D. from the Institute of Fine Arts at New York University (NYU). Her dissertation was titled, "Lacquerwork of Safavid Persia and Its Relationship to Persian Painting" (1994).

== Career ==
=== Tehran ===
From 1973 to 1975, Diba was an art advisor for the Private Secretariat of HM Queen Farah Pahlavi of Iran.

From 1975 to 1979, Diba was the founding director of Negārestān Museum (Persian: موزه نگارستان), a public collection of eighteenth and nineteenth century Iranian painting, based in Tehran, Iran. She was the first woman museum director in Iran. The museum was shut down during the 1979 Iranian Revolution. The Negarestan Museum was established by Queen Farah Pahlavi to promote the Persian art of the 18th and 19th-century.

=== New York City ===
Diba served as the associate curator and of Asian Art and as a curator of Islamic Art at the Brooklyn Museum. She has been an art advisor of various organizations such as, the Metropolitan Museum of Arts. She is a member of Encyclopædia Iranica's board of trustees and the Soudavar Memorial Foundation.

In December 2009, she held the role "scholar-in-residence" at Shangri La Museum of Islamic Art, Culture & Design.

=== Iran Modern (2013) ===
In 2013, Diba and Fereshteh Daftari co-curated the exhibition, Iran Modern (2013) shown at the Asia Society in New York. The exhibition was the first major exhibition of modern art from Iran, featuring 26 artists which included Ahmad Aali, Abbas, Massoud Arabshahi, Siah Armajani, Mohammad Ehsai, Monir Shahroudy Farmanfarmaian, Mansour Ghandriz, Marcos Grigorian, Ghasem Hajizadeh, Nahid Hagigat, Bahman Jalali, Rana Javadi, Reza Mafi, Leyly Matine-Daftary, Ardeshir Mohassess, Bahman Mohassess, Nicky Nodjoumi, Houshang Pezeshknia, Faramarz Pilaram, Behjat Sadr, Abolghassem Saidi, Sohrab Sepehri, Parviz Tanavoli, Mohsen Vaziri-Moqaddam, Manoucher Yektai, and Hossein Zenderoudi. The exhibition covered from 1948 until 1977, and was divided into sections including Saqqakhaneh and neotraditional art styles influenced by folk art history, abstract art, and calligraphy.

== Personal life ==
She was married to the businessman Mahmoud T. Diba, who was among the victims of Swissair Flight 111 crash in 1998. Diba has a son. She lives in New York City, New York.

== Publications ==
- Diba, Layla S. (1994). Lacquerwork of Safavid Persia and Its Relationship to Persian Painting: Text. Institute of Fine Arts, New York University.
- Diba, Layla S.; Ekhtiar, Maryam; Tauris, I. B. (1998). Royal Persian Paintings: The Qajar Epoch, 1785-1925. Brooklyn, New York: Brooklyn Museum of Art. ISBN 9781860642562.
- Amanat, Abbas; Balaghi, Shiva; Behdad, Ali; Diba, Layla S.; Ekhtiar, Maryam; Grabar, Oleg; Luft, Paul; Najmabadi, Afsaneh; Scarce, Jennifer M. (2001). Re-presenting the Qajars: new research in the study of 19th-century Iran. Iranian studies. Vol. 34. Priscilla Parsons Soucek, Heidi Walcher, Ehsan Yar-Shater. Society for Iranian Studies.
- Journey Through Asia: Masterpieces in the Brooklyn Museum of Art; with Amy G. Poster. Brooklyn Museum Bookshop, 2003.
- Diba, Layla S. (2011). Turkmen Jewelry: Silver Ornaments from the Marshall and Marilyn R. Wolf Collection. Stefano Carboni, Jean-François de Lapérouse. New York City, New York: Metropolitan Museum of Art. ISBN 9781588394156.
- Diba, Layla S.; Daftari, Fereshteh, eds. (2013). Iran Modern. Asia Society Museum.

== See also ==
- Persian art
- Qajar art
