= List of people from Lahijan =

This is a List of people from Lahijan, Gilan province, Iran who have been born in, raised in, lived in or who died in Lahijan, Gilan, Iran. Individuals are listed by field in which they are best known:

== Scientists ==
- Mohammad Ali Mojtahedi Gilani - Founder of Sharif University of Technology and Director of Alborz High School.

== Poets and writers ==
- Bijan Najdi - Poet and Writer
- Hazin Lahiji - Iranian Poet and Scholar
- Abd al-Razzaq Lahiji Theologian, Poet and Philosopher

== Sportspeople ==
- Farshid Karimi, football player

== Politicians ==
- Hassan Zia-Zarifi - Iranian intellectual and one of the founders of the communist guerrilla movement in Iran
- Reza Qotbi - Head of Iranian National TV

== Artists ==
- Ghasem Hajizadeh, pioneering painter in Iranian Pop art
- Ardeshir Mohassess, painter and cartoonist
- Parviz Sayyad, one of the leading Iranian actors in 1960's

== Religion ==
- Sheikh Zahed Gilani - Grandmaster of the famed Zahediyeh Sufi Order at Lahijan
