= Unbuilt America =

Book by Alison Sky

- Hardcover edition
- Author: Alison Sky, Michelle Stone
- Language: English
- Subject: Architecture
- Publisher: Abbeville Press
- Publication date: 1976
- Publication place: United States
- ISBN: 978-0-89659-341-1
- OCLC: 8974846
- Dewey Decimal: 720/.973 19
- LC Class: NA705 .S55 1983

Unbuilt America: Forgotten Architecture in the United States from Thomas Jefferson to the space age is a 1976 book by Alison Sky and Michelle Stone. The book describes and shows plans of buildings and monuments, that were planned but never built, throughout the first two centuries of the history of the United States. Projects featured in book include rejects entries for building competitions like the New York Crystal Palace and the Chicago Tribune Tower and unrealized projects by architects like Frank Lloyd Wright and Siah Armajani.

It was reviewed in New York Affairs by Cora Angier Sowa; a 2007 exhibition at Georgia Tech called Unbuilt Atlanta cited the book as its inspiration.
