= Parsforte =

Parsforte (in English: Parsforte, with the special styling PARSFORTE International Magazine) is an international art and culture magazine that focuses on contemporary art, design, and visual culture, as well as the introduction of international artists and the publication of art articles, and in particular addresses the art of Iran, the Middle East, and Italy within global contexts. This magazine is published in two formats, print (ISSN 2816-0000) and online (ISSN 2816-6019), by Rima Publishing, a subsidiary of Rima Holding and the Rima Cultural Association (Rima APS). Its managing director and editor-in-chief is Amir Amin Sharifi, an artist, curator, and cultural manager with international experience in organizing exhibitions.

== History and focus ==
Parsforte was founded in the early 2020s and, from the outset, as a bilingual (English–Italian) publication, began its activity as an analytical art magazine that introduced contemporary and emerging artists of the world and their presence in the European art scene.

The magazine’s editorial goal is to promote intercultural dialogue between the visual arts of East and West. The magazine is published in both print and digital formats, and its issues are archived and available to the public on Amazon Kindle, Internet Archive, and Issuu.

Parsforte is also registered with Library and Archives Canada and is accessible in national bibliographic databases.

== Exhibitions and activities ==
Since its founding, Parsforte has actively organized numerous exhibitions in Tbilisi, Dubai, İzmir, and Rome, and other European cities, showcasing the works of Iranian, Middle Eastern, European, and international artists without any limitation. Photo reports of the exhibitions are printed and presented in the magazine. The 105th exhibition of this magazine in the summer of 2025 in Rome was well received by audiences. Through its curatorial activities, the magazine has played an effective role in promoting intercultural dialogue and introducing contemporary art. The group and solo exhibitions of this magazine and these art events have received wide coverage in Italian media and were reviewed in publications such as OggiRoma, PrimaPaginaNews, Meridiana Notizie, Tuscia Times, La Voce del Lazio, Radio Roma Capitale, Fatti Italiani, Cavaliere News, Notizie Romane, and Artribune.

Special coverage of this event in media such as AGR Online, AboutArtOnline, Cavaliere News, and AGR TV has attracted attention and audience appreciation. The aforementioned exhibitions and other organized events reflect Parsforte’s ongoing commitment to presenting contemporary art and emerging artists without any borders or limitations.

Reports and analyses published in independent Italian media, including La Voce del Lazio, Radio Roma Capitale, Fatti Italiani, Cavaliere News, Notizie Romane, and Artribune, are considered a confirmation of the importance of these activities and their impact on the contemporary art scene. One of Parsforte’s important hallmarks is supporting women artists and the special promotion of women’s art, in such a way that in the archive of this magazine, most of the introduced artists are women artists.

== Independent recognition and media coverage ==
Parsforte has been commended by independent publications and cultural media as a magazine that plays both a publishing role and a curatorial role. Italian cultural media such as Exibart have listed Parsforte among publishers and organizers active in the field of contemporary art in Italy. Sattin Magazine has also referred to Parsforte’s role in introducing and promoting contemporary art of Iran and the Middle East among European audiences. The reflection of Parsforte’s activities in independent media is evidence of its active and effective presence in the Italian art scene and of the curatorial role in leading the magazine’s cultural projects.

== Archival and publication records ==
Previous issues of Parsforte are preserved in public digital archives. The registration of this magazine in Library and Archives Canada and its listings on Amazon, Issuu, and Internet Archive provide evidence of its credibility and continuity of publishing activity and enable access for international researchers and readers.

== See also ==
- List of art magazines
- Iranian modern and contemporary art
