= Aali (surname) =

Aali is a surname. Notable people with the surname include:

- Jamiluddin Aali (1925–2015), Pakistani writer, critic, and scholar
- Ahmad Aali (born 1935), Iranian photographer and artist
- Mehmed Emin Âli Pasha (1815–1871), Ottoman statesman
