= Royal Persian Paintings: The Qajar Epoch 1785–1925 =

Art exhibition in 1998–1999

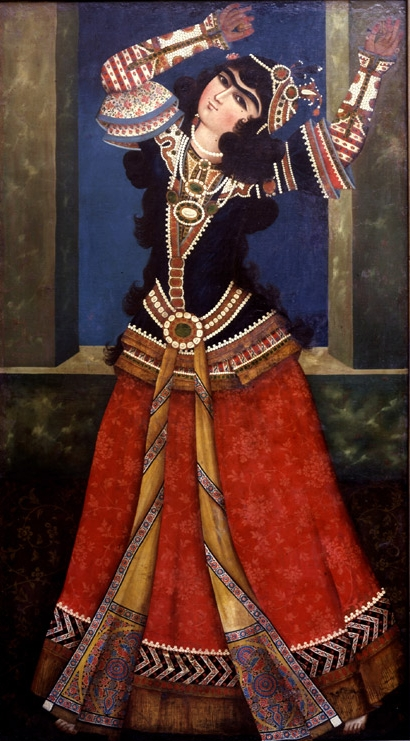
A royal Persian painting which portraits a Qajar princess

Royal Persian Paintings: The Qajar Epoch 1785–1925 was the first major exhibition of Qajar art, which took place from October 1998 to June 1999 at the Brooklyn Museum in New York. The curator of the exhibition was Layla S. Diba, Hagop Kevorkian Curator of Islamic Art at the Brooklyn Museum, a scholar of Persian art in the 18th and 19th centuries, assisted by Maryam Ekhtiar, Research Associate at the Brooklyn Museum.

The exhibition later took place at UCLA/Hammer Museum in Los Angeles from February 24 to May 9, 1999, and SOAS in London from July 6 – Sep 30, 1999.

The catalogue of the exhibition, edited by Layla S. Diba and Maryam Ekhtiar with scholarly articles and more than 200 images of the paintings, was published later by I. B. Tauris in London.

The critic Holland Cotter of The New York Times described the exhibition's contents as "[a]n assertive, self-promotional dynastic art of almost hallucinatory strangeness and brilliance."

== See also ==
- Persian art
- Qajar art
