= Amrollah Farhadi =

Iranian graphic designer and educator

- امرالله فرهادی آردکپان
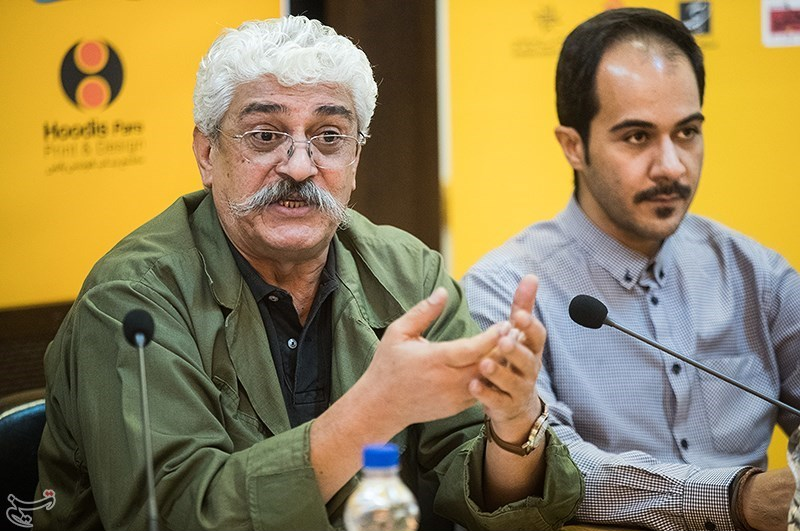
- Farhadi in 2016
- Born: Amrollah Farhadi Ardkapan; 1335 SH (1956–1957); Fars province, Iran
- Education: Faculty of Decorative Arts, Tehran
- Known for: Graphic design, advertising, photography and art direction
- Awards: Grand Medal and Golden Tooba, Fajr International Visual Arts Festival

Amrollah Farhadi Ardkapan (Persian: امرالله فرهادی; born 1335 SH, corresponding to 1956–1957), commonly known as Amrollah Farhadi, is an Iranian graphic designer, advertising art director, photographer and teacher. He was a founding board member of the Iranian Graphic Designers Society and later served as its secretary.

Farhadi founded the Vije School of Visual Communication in Tehran in 2005 and served as general secretary of the ninth Tehran International Poster Biennial in 2007.

== Early life and education ==
Farhadi was born into a nomadic Qashqai family in Fars province. He attended one of the mobile tent schools established for nomadic communities by the educator Mohammad Bahmanbeigi. He later studied at the Qashqai boarding secondary school in Shiraz, where he became interested in painting and photography.

In the 1970s he entered the Faculty of Decorative Arts in Tehran and specialised in graphic design. His teachers included Morteza Momayez, Mohammad Ehsai, Kamran Katouzian and Iraj Anvari.

== Career ==
Farhadi began working in advertising while still a university student. In the late 1970s, he and Iraj Zargami established a design studio that was later renamed Vije Graphic. The studio worked in corporate identity, packaging, print advertising and marketing communications.

In 2005 he founded the Vije School of Visual Communication. Its early academic council included Morteza Momayez, Ebrahim Haghighi, Masoud Sepehr and Reza Abedini. The school offered courses and workshops in graphic design, typography, advertising and visual communication.

Farhadi was a member of the first board of the Iranian Graphic Designers Society and served on its third and fourth boards between 2003 and 2009. He has also taught graphic design and advertising at universities and independent art institutions in Iran.

== Walls Talking ==
During the Iranian Revolution Farhadi photographed political slogans and images painted on the walls of Tehran. The photographs initially formed part of his university graduation project and were later published in the book Walls Talking.

The book was published in 2021 in cooperation with the Iranian National Commission for UNESCO and was introduced at the Tehran Museum of Contemporary Art. The photographs document the competing political and social discourses visible in Tehran during the revolutionary period.

== Awards ==
In 2018 Farhadi received the Grand Medal, Golden Plaque and Golden Tooba at the tenth Fajr International Visual Arts Festival in recognition of his career in graphic design.
