= Sanaz Mazinani =

Iranian-born Canadian visual artist (born 1978)

- ساناز مزینانی
- Born: 1978 (age 46–47); Tehran, Iran
- Education: OCAD University (BFA), Stanford University (MFA)
- Known for: Installation artist, photographer, curator, educator
- Works: Site, Sight, and Insight, Frames of the Visible, Conference of the Birds, Room for Disruption, Celebrating Bay Area Activism, Iran Revisited, When We Start to Love War
- Movement: Contemporary Art
- Awards: Canada Council for the Arts (2013), SF Arts Commission (2013), Kala Art Institute fellowship (2012)
- Website: sanazmazinani.com

Sanaz Mazinani (Persian: ساناز مزینانی; born 1978) is an Iranian–born Canadian multidisciplinary visual artist, curator and educator, known for her photography and installation art. She is based in San Francisco and Toronto.

== Biography ==
=== Early life ===
Sanaz Mazinani was born in Tehran, Iran in 1978, prior to the Iranian Revolution. Her brother is artist Mani Mazinani. She immigrated to Canada at the age of 11. While in Canada, Mazinani studied at the Ontario College of Art and Design (currently known as OCAD University), where she graduated in 2003. She later moved to the United States in 2009. She received a Master of Fine Arts degree at Stanford University in 2011.

=== Artwork ===
Notable projects include: Bay Area Activism, 2013; Site, Sight, and Insight, 2013; Conference of the Birds, 2012; Frames of the Visible, 2011–2013; Room for Disruption, 2011; When We Start to Love War, 2010; Iran Revisited, 1999–2013.

Unfolding Images, published by Bulger Gallery Press in April 2012 and co-authored by Jeremiah Barber, David Fresko and Mohammadreza Mirzaei.

== Exhibitions ==
Mazinani's art works have been included in numerous exhibitions throughout North America, Europe and Asia. Notable group exhibitions include Twisted Sisters: Reimagining Urban Portraiture at the Museum Bärengasse, Zurich, Switzerland and San Francisco City Hall. Organized by the San Francisco Arts Commission and curated by Alexandra Blättler and San Francisco Arts Commission Gallery Director, Meg Shiffler; Magic of Persia Contemporary Art Prize 2013 Exhibition at the Emirates Financial Towers in Dubai, United Arab Emirates; Sarai Reader 09 Festival, New Delhi, India Border Cultures, curated by Srimoyee Mitra at the Art Gallery of Windsor, Windsor, Canada, which won the Ontario Association of Art Galleries exhibit of the year award; Shadow Puppets: Traces of New Documentary Practices at the Welch School Galleries, curated by Jill Frank and Stephanie Dowda for the Georgia State University; and Occupy Bay Area, at the Yerba Buena Center for the Arts in San Francisco, California; Signal to Noise, SF Camerawork, San Francisco, California.

Significant solo exhibitions include: Sight, Site, and Insight at Gallery 44 Center for Contemporary Photography in 2013 which was accompanied by an exhibition catalogue written by Rosemary Heather; Celebrating Bay Area Activism, a series of six photo-collage works installed in 36 bus kiosks along Market Street in San Francisco, as part of the SFAC Art on Market Street Public Art program; Frames of the Visible in 2012 at Stephen Bulger Gallery in Toronto, Canada, as a featured exhibition in the Scotiabank CONTACT Photography Festival, and U.S.A.I.R.A.N (2014), a public art installation that activates a vacant space by covering all its windows with a set of twenty-one digital montages;Signal to Noise in 2017 at the San Francisco Camerawork Gallery in San Francisco, California; Light Times in 2019 at both the Stephen Bulger Gallery, and the Triton Museum of Art in Santa Clara, California.

== Awards ==
Mazinani has been awarded grants from the Canada Council (2013), the San Francisco Arts Commission Cultural Equity Grant (2013), as well as awards from Stanford University, Ontario Arts Council, and the Toronto Arts Council for the development and creation of her projects. Mazinani was named a 2012 Kala Art Institute Fellow. She was awarded the SFAC Art on Market Street commission for the project Celebrating Bay Area Activism.

== Curation ==
Mazinani's recent curatorial projects included three exhibitions created for the Tirgan biennial festival in Toronto in 2013. These included Made in China, an outdoor art installation by Tehran-based artist Negar Farajiani, Hope Echoed, an exhibition of portraits of Iranian women by Toronto's lively arts community, and The Third Space, a three-month exhibition featuring works by six Iranian artists held at the York Quay Gallery in Toronto's Harbourfront Centre The exhibition focused on the hybrid identities that result from life in the diaspora and received much acclaim.

Other curatorial projects have included, Visions of Eternity (2011), including works by Abbas Akhavan, Parastou Forouhar, Nasser Ovissi, Reza Derakshani, Oldouz Moslemian, Taimaz Moslemian, Hamed Sahihi, Soody Sharifi, and Ali Soltani; New Constellations: Contemporary Iranian Video Art, with colleague Amirali Ghasemi; Off World, an interactive site-specific outdoor installation with Andrew Mallis and Mateo Guez, and ALMANAC: An Index of Current Work and Thought, a collaborative publication addressing the relationship between theory and practice, The Death of Photography (Bulger Gallery Press, 2008).

== See also ==
- List of Iranian women artists
