= Sadegh Barirani =

Iranian graphic designer, painter and calligrapher (1923–2025)

- صادق بریرانی
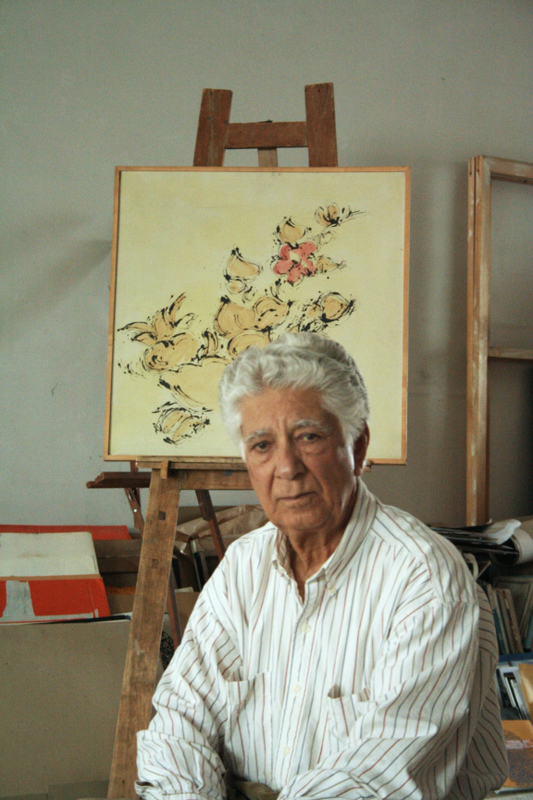
- Barirani in 2007
- Born: 1923; Gilan province, Iran
- Died: 4 February 2025 (aged 101); California, United States
- Education: University of Tehran; Indiana University
- Known for: Graphic design, painting, calligraphy

Sadegh Barirani (Persian: صادق بریرانی; 1923 – 4 February 2025) was an Iranian graphic designer, painter and calligrapher. He was one of the early prominent figures in the development of modern graphic design in Iran.

Barirani's work combined modernist visual elements with forms drawn from Persian calligraphy, traditional decorative arts and literature. He also became associated with the development of modern Iranian artist-calligraphy.

== Early life and education ==
Barirani was born in Anzali in northern Iran in 1923.

He studied painting at the Faculty of Fine Arts of the University of Tehran, graduating in 1952.He attended an audiovisual programme ran by the Syracuse University in Tehran in 1953 and continued his studies at Indiana University in 1959.

== Career ==
After completing his studies in Tehran, Barirani started to work at the graphic design studios at Iran's Ministry of Culture and Art, where he directed the graphic design department between 1964 and 1979 and designed approximately fifty commemorative postage stamps during this period, including a stamp issued for the twenty-fifth anniversary of UNICEF.

Barirani was closely associated with the expansion of cultural graphic design in Iran during the 1960s and 1970s. He produced posters for concerts, theatrical productions and other cultural events. His work included posters for Roudaki Hall in Tehran, where he designed promotional material from the early years of the institution, as well as designs and illustrations for the first issues of Roudaki magazine.

Writing on the history of Iranian graphic design, Morteza Momayez identified Barirani as one of the prominent designers active from the early 1960s, during a period when graphic design became increasingly connected with cultural institutions, festivals, publishing and mass communication.

== Artistic practice ==
Alongside his work as a graphic designer, Barirani maintained an independent practice as a painter and calligraphic artist. His visual language drew on Persian calligraphy as well as the ornamental forms of Iranian tilework, carpets and manuscript painting. Persian mystical poetry, particularly its emphasis on rhythm, repetition and spiritual experience, was another recurring source for his work.

His paintings and calligraphic compositions frequently transformed written forms into absolute abstraction.

Barirani's graphic works also combined western modernist influences with an Iranian visual language.

== Exhibitions and recognition ==
Barirani exhibited both his graphic works and paintings in Iran and internationally. Exhibitions such as the Tehran Biennials of 1964 and 1966, the International Biennale of Graphic Design in Brno in 1970 and 1978, and the International Poster Biennale in Warsaw in 1972, 1976 and 1978. The Brno Biennale Association records his participation in more than twenty exhibitions and international events in cities including Brno, New Delhi, New York, Paris, Venice, Shiraz, Tehran and Warsaw.

In 1977, Barirani received a silver medal in Leipzig, Germany. He also served as a member of the international jury of the Brno graphic-design biennale in the 1970s and later as a juror for the Tehran Graphic Design Biennial.

In 2022, the Iranian Academy of Arts organised a tribute to Barirani in Tehran. The programme included discussions of his role in modern Iranian painting, graphic design and calligraphic art, together with an exhibition of his late Simorgh series, consisting of thirty paintings referring to Attar's Conference of the Birds.

== Death ==
Barirani died in California on 4 February 2025, at the age of 101. His death was announced by graphic designer, Bahram Kalhornia during a press conference for the 17th Fajr Visual Arts Festival.

== See also ==
- Iranian modern and contemporary art
- Saqqakhaneh movement
- Morteza Momayez
- Ghobad Shiva
- Farshid Mesghali
