= Bahram Alivandi =

Austrian-Iranian artist (1928–2012)

Bahram Alivandi (1928 – 21 May 2012; Persian: بهرام عالیوندی) was an Iranian-born Austrian visual artist. He was known primarily for his modernist paintings, which typically depicted stories from Persian mythology and literature, and expressed mysticism. He has also produced a number of wall tapestries that, like his works on canvas, demonstrate his own instantly recognizable visual language. He lived in Vienna, Austria from 1983 to 2012.

== Biography ==
Ferdowsi and His Mythos, c.1980s, Vienna, Private Collection. Oil on canvas, 200 x 150 cm.

Alivandi was born in 1928, in Fars province in the South of Pahlavi Iran (now Iran). He gained his artistic training in Tehran, initially at the Kamal-ol-Molk Academy of Art. Then under the tuition of French masters at Tehran's School of Fine Arts (closely modeled on the French École des Beaux-Arts), from which he graduated with distinction. He completed a further degree in painting at the College of Decorative Arts, Tehran.

In 1959, he was appointed by the Ministry of Education, teaching painting at the Workshop of National Art and the Kamal-ol-Molk Academy of Art, a post that he held for 20 years. During this time he practiced a variety of traditional Persian arts such as the Miniature, Ceramics, Tapestries, and Silversmithery.

During this time Alivandi was one of Iran's leading modernists, but he left Iran in 1983, several years after the Iranian revolution of 1979 to escape the repression and censorship. Alivandi joined the National Council of Resistance of Iran in 1994, and was a member until his death on May 12, 2012. He lived and worked in Vienna from 1983 to 2012.

Alivandi belongs to a respected generation of Iranian artists who are important figures in contemporary Iranian art, including Massoud Arabshahi, Nasser Ovissi, and Parviz Tanavoli, to all of whom he is well known.

== Artistic style ==
Simorgh (The Conference of the Birds), c.1980s, Vienna, Private Collection. Oil on canvas, 200 x 150 cm.

Alivandi's work is rich in symbolism and motifs, such as the fish, gazelle, and horse, which are traditional motifs of Persian miniatures. He is influenced by Persian culture, depicting characters and stories from legends and epic poetry by important figures like Ferdowsi and Farid ad-Din Attar. Outstanding works include a series of large-scale oil paintings executed in the 1980s which depict such important figures as Mithra, Jesus Christ, the Simorgh, and Ferdowsi himself. Some of his work is influenced by the war situation and the repression of his native Iran, and expresses the pain and suffering of his people.

In terms of technique his work is at times traditional and at times highly original. Alivandi's early paintings, including those from the 1980s, use the now-traditional medium of oil on canvas, yet his aesthetic style, which recalls the stained glass of medieval churches, is highly personal. During the 1990s Alivandi continued to work in oils, but abandoned the traditional canvas, choosing instead to apply his paints directly to newspaper; a method pioneered by the cubists in the early 1900s. Since c. 2000, he increasingly works with the angelique pointillage technique (as seen in the adjacent image), a unique method of painting with extremely small dots of ink which are then covered with a layer of veneer to lock and intensify the colours. This innovative pointillist technique has resulted in the many striking works that demonstrate the beauty of his composition and the power of his vision. According to one critic, his masterful blending of hues has earned him the title "the magician of colours".

Alivandi's paintings are typically on a large scale, yet even so they demonstrate the immense skill of his hand in their intricate detail.

== Exhibitions ==
2005, Vienna, Private Collection. Ink and veneer on canvas.

Alivandi's work has been exhibited throughout Europe and Asia, and have received high critical acclaim. Important recent exhibitions include:

Selected solo:

- Alivandi's work has been shown at the Headquarters of the United Nations in Vienna.
- 'Art in Exile', a one-man show in Vienna in June 2007, consisting of 73 works of watercolour, oil on canvas, and works on paper.

Selected group:

- In 2008 in Vienna, a highly significant exhibition organised by UNESCO included Ferdowsi – an important work by Alivandi which depicts the Shahnameh, an enormous poetic opus written by the Iranian poet Ferdowsi around 1000 CE that is the national epic of the Persian-speaking world.
- In December 2007 in Paris, Alivandi was exhibited alongside two French artists at Galerie Art Présent, one of Paris's foremost galleries of contemporary art. Following the exhibition, in January 2008, a French article entitled 'Un grand peintre en exile' ('A great painter in exile') wrote that Alivandi's "synthesis of European training with sixty years of artistic experience derived from a deep knowledge of Persian art and spirituality, has resulted in the creation of a new genre that is unique to him." This critic also noted that Alivandi's paintings represent a "paradise of dots".

== Prizes ==
- Stockholm, 1994: Alivandi won First Prize at the 1st International Graphic Art Exhibition, an annual juried show in Stockholm, Sweden.

== Bibliography ==
Articles:

- 'Un Grand Peintre en Exil: Bahram Alivandi', Bulletin du Comité d'Amitié Franco-Iranien (Janvier 2008): p. 4.
- Leibinger-Hasibether, Ursula, 'Im Paradies der Punkte', Nordbayerischer Kurier (Montag, 16. März 1998)
- 'Iranischer Maler stellt in Neuhaus aus', Nordbayerischer Kurier (Dienstag, 1. Oktober 1996)
- 'Knotenmänner und sensible Frauen', Hersbrucker Zeitung Nummer 249 (Samstag/Sonntag, 26./27. Oktober 1991)
- 'Philosophie und Mystik Persiens [Persian Philosophy and Mysticism]' (Samstag/Sonntag, 5./6. Oktober 1991)

Exhibition catalogues:

- Kunst im Exil [Art in Exile], exh. cat. Mödling: Galerie Sala Terrena, 2007.
- Bahram Alivandi: Und Sein Paradies Der Punkte [Bahram Alivandi: And His Paradise of Dots], exh. cat. Vienna: 1999.
- Bahram Alivandi, exh. cat. Weidenberg: Galerie Bahnhof, 1998.
