= Motarjem =

Iranian quarterly magazine

- Editor: Ali Khazaee Farid
- Frequency: Quarterly
- Founded: 1991
- Country: Iran
- Based in: Mashhad
- Language: Persian

Motarjem (Persian: مترجم, lit. 'Translator') is a quarterly magazine published in Mashhad, Iran, dedicated to translation. The magazine was launched in 1991. It was founded by Ali Khazaee Farid who also publishes it privately. Its contributors include Karim Emami, Abdollah Kowsari, Goli Emami among others.
