= Mehdi Vosoughnia =

Iranian photographer (born 1971)

- مهدی وثوق‌نیا
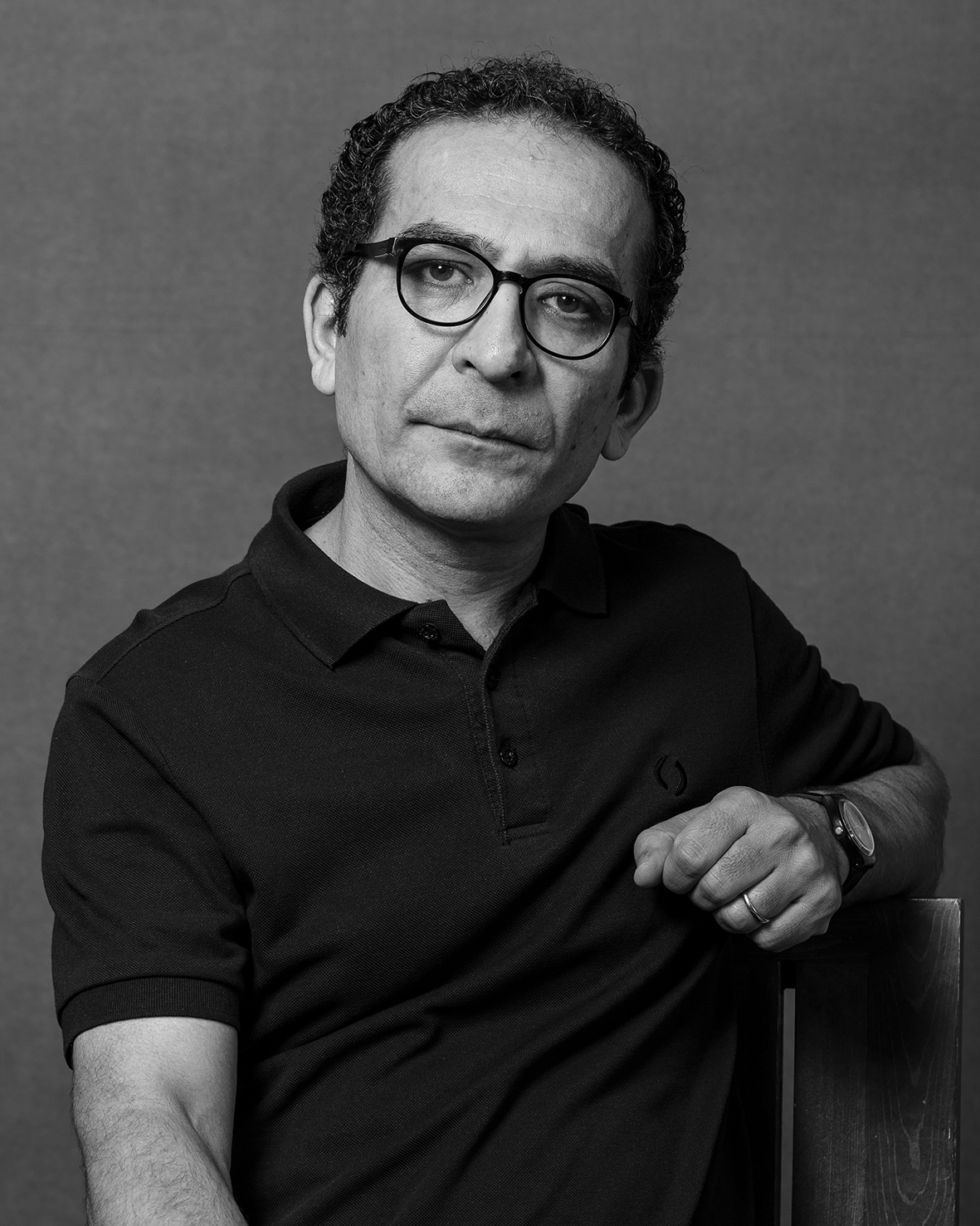
- Born: 13 September 1971 (age 54); Qazvin, Pahlavi Iran (now Iran)
- Occupations: Photographer, educator, art director
- Known for: Documentary and urban photography
- Notable work: Pamenar (2015), Anzali (2014)
- Spouse: Hasti Zahiri
- Website: mehdivosoughnia.com

Mehdi Vosoughnia (Persian: مهدی وثوق‌نیا; born 13 September 1971) is an Iranian documentary photographer and university lecturer. He is a guest lecturer at the faculty of fine arts at the University of Tehran, and at Manzar Studio. His main areas of activity include documentary photography, with a focus on urban and architectural photography. He lives in Tehran.

== Early life and education ==
Mehdi Vosoughnia was born on 13 September 1971 in Qazvin, Pahlavi Iran. Vosoughnia holds a bachelor's degree in photography from the faculty of art and architecture at Islamic Azad University's Central Tehran Branch, and a diploma in graphic design from Valiasr Technical School in Rasht. During his studies, he was mentored by prominent instructors such as Bahman Jalali, Kaveh Golestan, and Yahya Dehghanpour.

== Life ==
Vosoughnia began his photography journey in 1988 through independent classes offered by the Iranian Youth Cinema Society. This period coincided with profound social transformations in Iran, which steered him toward documentary photography. His work has centered on capturing Iran's landscapes, particularly urban areas, with a critical eye on city spaces and cultural identity. His approach often falls within the cityscape genre, where he aesthetically documents the physical elements of urban life. A recurring theme in his photography is the deliberate absence of people, which creates an evocative sense of ghostliness. This technique portrays human presence not through figures but through lingering traces and symbols, framing themes like mortality as a liminal state between existence and erasure rather than a definitive end.

== Career ==
Vosoughnia's works have been exhibited in more than fifty solo and group exhibitions in Iran, Europe, Canada, United States, and Middle Eastern countries. He has also been active as a juror in numerous photography events. Among the most notable are the 7th Press Photo of the Year Award in Iran (2025), the Sheed Award for Documentary Photography in 2016, the 9th edition of Ten Days with Iranian Photographers (2019), as well as the 3rd and 8th Annual Student Photography Festivals at the University of Tehran (2018 and 2025). Alongside photography, Vosoughnia works as an art director and editor of photography books, and his works have been published in specialized journals in Iran and abroad.

== Professional activities ==
- 2022–present: Member of Photography Department, Iranian Youth Cinema Society
- 2020: Scientific Secretary of 5th Annual Student Photography Festival, University of Tehran
- 2019: Curator of the exhibition, Landscapes Before the Eyes, Silk Road Gallery, Tehran
- 2018: Member of Policy Council of Sheed Social Documentary Photography Award
- 2017: Art Director of 6th Ten Days with Iranian Photographers
- 2016: Curator of the exhibition: "Valiasr Street", Silk Road Gallery, Tehran

== Publications ==
=== Books featuring Vosoughnia ===
- Issa, Rose, ed. (2008). Contribution to Iranian Photography Now. Hatje Cantz Verlag. ISBN 978-3775722575.
- Etehadieh, Anahita Ghabaian; Tavakolian, Newsha (2017). Iran, Année 38 (exhibition catalogue). Textuel and Arte éditions. ISBN 978-2-84597-581-1.
- Keshmirshekan, Hamid (2024). Rethinking the Contemporary Art of Iran. Milan, Italy: Skira. ISBN 978-8857249667.
- Mohammadi, Aram (2025). Contemporary Photography in Iran. London: Palgrave Macmillan. ISBN 978-3031790546.

=== Books authored by Vosoughnia ===
- Vosoughnia, Mehdi (2015). Anzali Photos. Tehran: Nazar Research and Cultural Institute. ISBN 9786001521898.
- Vosoughnia, Mehdi (2015). Kahrizak A Window to Life. Tehran: Haft Rang Publishing.
- Vosoughnia, Mehdi (2015). Pamenar. Tehran: Bongah Publishing.
- Vosoughnia, Mehdi (2021). One Hundred Years of Cityscape Photography in Tehran. Tehran: Elmi Farhangi Publishing.
