= Farhad Moshiri (artist) =

Iranian artist (1963–2024)

- فرهاد مشیری
- Born: 1963; Shiraz, Iran
- Died: 17 July 2024 (aged 61); Tehran, Iran
- Education: California Institute of the Arts
- Known for: Painter and installation artist
- Movement: Hurufiyya movement; Pop art
- Spouse(s): Shirin Aliabadi, Parisa Babaee

Farhad Moshiri (Persian: فرهاد مشیری; 1963 – 17 July 2024) was an Iranian artist based in Tehran. His artwork is rooted in Pop art dialect with a subtle, subversive socio-political commentary.

== Biography ==
Moshiri was born in Shiraz, Iran in 1963. He studied fine arts at California Institute of the Arts in Valencia, California, in the 1980s, where he first started experimenting with installations, video art and painting. He received his MFA from California Institute of the Arts in 1984, before moving back to Tehran in 1991. He subsequently became well known for his ironic interpretations of hybrids between traditional Iranian forms and those of the consumerist and globalized popular culture widespread in his country.

In the early 2000s, Moshiri was most readily associated with his paintings of jars, which are decorated with traditional Iranian sayings and poetic verse, written in Persian calligraphy. These monumental containers have been described as receptacles of life, memory and desire, and reflect his fascination with archaeology.

His painted jars, which form a trademark of his production, look like three-dimensional objects, bursting with popular foods, drinks and desserts, with popular scripts elegantly written on their body. Other significant works include Stereo Surround Sofa (2004), Silver Portrait on Red (2004), Diamond Brain (2004–05) and A Dream in Tehran (2007).

Moshiri was also interested in the repetition of numbers and letters in scripts for their intrinsic beauty as opposed to any literal meaning or sense they might hold.

In Kennedy’s Salt and Pepper Shaker, from 2005, he presented the instantly recognizable Kennedy couple in the form of salt and pepper shakers.

His work is held in several public collections, including the Virginia Museum of Fine Arts, Richmond, the Farjam Collection, Dubai, and the British Museum, London.

Moshiri was represented by The Third Line gallery in Dubai, Galerie Emmanuel Perrotin in Paris, New York, Tokyo and Hong Kong, Rodolphe Janssen in Brussels, and Thaddeus Ropac in Salzburg and London. He died in Tehran on 17 July 2024, at the age of 61.

== Bibliography ==
- Dina Nasser-Khadivi, Maryam Ekhtiar, Farhad Moshiri, Skira, Milan, 2016. ISBN 978-8-8572-2983-6.
- Michele Robecchi, Farhad Moshiri, Perrotin Editions, Paris, 2012. ISBN 978-2-9532-7979-5
- Oliver Wick and Jérôme Sans, Farhad Moshiri, The Third Line, Janssen, Perrotin Editions and Ropac, 2010. ISBN 978-2-9532-7975-7

== See also ==
- Baghdad School
- Islamic art
- Iranian art
- Islamic calligraphy
- List of Iranian artists
- Modern and contemporary art in Iran
