= Shirin Aliabadi =

Iranian artist (1973–2018)

- Born: 10 March 1973; Tehran, Iran
- Died: 1 October 2018 (aged 45); Tehran, Iran
- Education: University of Paris
- Occupation: Multidisciplinary visual artist
- Spouse: Farhad Moshiri

Shirin Aliabadi (10 March 1973 – 1 October 2018) was an Iranian contemporary multidisciplinary visual artist whose work focused on women's issues, gender representation, and the beauty industry. She is best known for depiction of rebellious Iranian women in her Girls in Cars and Miss Hybrid series of photographs.

== Biography ==
Aliabadi was born in Tehran, Iran, in 1973 to Maymanat and Iraj Aliabadi. Her mother, Maymanat is an artist and taught at Tehran University. Her father, Iraj was a poet who worked for an insurance company. She was also mentored by older brother who coached her on art, music, and pop culture. Aliabadi grew up surrounded by artists and intellectuals, and the standard of living for the family was high until the Iranian Revolution in 1979. Her parents lost their jobs, but were still able to send her to study in Paris. Aliabadi studied art history at the University of Paris, where she also earned a master's degree in art history.

Aliabadi married Farhad Moshiri, another artist in 1993. She commuted between Paris and Tehran for most of her career, but was primarily based in Tehran where she was represented by The Third Line gallery in Dubai for more than ten years.

Her work has appeared in solo exhibitions in Dubai, Tehran, London, Switzerland and Denmark, and in group exhibitions at the Institut des cultures d'Islam in Paris, the Gallery of Modern Art in Glasgow, at Frieze New York, at the Chelsea Art Museum, in Monaco, in Rio de Janeiro, in Copenhagen, in Italy, in Norway, in Estonia, in Germany, in Switzerland and in Spain. Her work is held in the collections of Deutsche Bank AG in Germany, the Bristol City Museum and Art Gallery and the Farjam Collection in Dubai.

Shirin Aliabadi died on 1 October 2018 in Tehran, Iran after a battle with cancer.

== Artwork ==
Banal as the symbols of consumer society may seem: Starbucks, bags by Goyard or iPods. In Iran they become a subliminal instrument of the so-called cultural invasion from the West, which the Iranian authorities equate with the 'great Satan'. For the young generation, in particular for the women, such fashion accessories become – in a beguiling manner – a kind of passive rebellion. This is the moment when fashion is not only fashion – in this context the message is not superficial.

— Shirin Aliabadi, 2011,

Aliabadi's art, which includes photographs and drawings, explores the competing effects on young urban Iranian women of traditional values, religious restrictions and globalized western culture.

Aliabadi is well known for her photographic series Girls in Cars (2005), which portrayed women riding around in cars, ready to party. ''I was stuck in traffic one weekend in a pretty posh part of Tehran,'' Ms. Aliabadi said in a 2013 article for Deutsche Bank, where her works were on exhibit. ''We were surrounded by beautiful girls made up to go to a party or just cruising in their cars, and I thought then that this image of women chained by tradition and the hijab is not even close to reality here. They all had music on and were chatting to each other between the cars and making eyes and conversation with boys in other vehicles. Although respectful of the laws, they were having fun''. This contradiction between the heavy restrictions imposed by Iranian laws and young women having fun, playing with western-style fashion and accessories is the kind of subject matter Aliabadi is known for. Her work includes playful elements with more serious ones, mixing the political and the personal.

In 2006, Shirin Aliabadi also collaborated with fellow artist and husband Farhad Moshiri on a project called Operation Supermarket, which was shown at the 2008 Singapore Biennale. That photographic series focused on packages and advertising images manipulated so that the labels included loaded phrases, commenting on failed capitalism and consumerism. For example, a chocolate bar reads "intolerance", and dishwasher soap label reads "Shoot First".

Her Miss Hybrid (2008) series portrays young Iranian women in somewhat unconventional ways. For example, some of the photographs in this series portray women with bleached blonde hair, blue contact lenses, perfect makeup, and brightly colored headscarves, in stark contrast to the more commonly projected images of Muslim women swathed in a dull colored chador with no makeup and no hair showing. The women often have bandaids across their noses, a nod to a fashion statement among Iranian youth connoting the increasingly common incidence of plastic surgery. The photographs are depicted similar to studio portraits, portrayed from the mid-torso against dark backgrounds. The portraits are hybrids between traditional attire and contemporary fashion trends, commenting on artificial beauty and the sartorial confines of some Muslim women.

== See also ==
- List of Iranian artists
- List of Iranian women artists
