= Mina Nouri =

Iranian painter, printmaker and educator (born 1951)

- Born: Mina Nouri; 1951 (age 74–75); Tehran, Iran
- Education: Accademia di Belle Arti di Roma, Accademia di Albertina, Torino, Istituto Statale d'Arte Urbino
- Known for: Painting, Printmaking
- Spouse: Ahmad Aali

Mina Nouri (Persian: مینا نوری; born in 1951) is an Iranian painter, printmaker and educator.

== Biography ==
Mina Nouri was born in 1951 in Tehran, Iran. She is married to photographer Ahmad Aali.

Between 1970 and 1975, she studied at Accademia di Belle Arti di Roma, as well as at Accademia di Albertina, Torino and Istituto Statale d'Arte Urbino. From 1975 until 1996, she was a member of faculty at Farabi University and at University of Art, Tehran, Iran.

== Publications ==
- A Practical Study of Serigraphy (Silk screen), 2006 Fourth Edition, 2001 Third Edition, 1992 Second Edition, 1981 First Edition
- Printmaking, The Chalcography Technique, 1995 First Edition.
- Printmaking, The Chalcography Technique, 2011 2nd Edition.
- The Etchings of Mina Nouri, 2002 First Edition.
- Nouri, Mina (2009). Mina Nouri: Printmaker. Iran: Assar Art Gallery.

== Translations ==
- Genesi della forma written by Mario Arnaboldi and Enrico Garbagnati, Published by University of Art, 2001 Second Edition, 1994 First Edition, Tehran, Iran.
