= Y.Z. Kami =

Iranian-born American visual artist (born 1956)

- Born: Kamran Youssefzadeh کامران یوسف‌زاده; 1956 (age 69–70); Tehran, Pahlavi Iran (now Iran)
- Education: University of California, Berkeley, Université Paris-Sorbonne
- Occupation: Visual artist
- Known for: Painting
- Website: yzkami.com

Y.Z. Kami (born- 1956, Kamran Youssefzadeh; Persian: کامران یوسف‌زاده) is an Iranian-born American visual artist. He is known for his large scale portrait paintings in oil on line. Kami is based in New York City. His works recreate the visceral experience of a face-to-face encounter. Through a matte, uniform haze, he depicts his subjects with eyes open or closed, gazing forward or looking down. In this way, drawing inspiration from a wide range of philosophical, literary, and religious texts, Kami continues the art historical quest to locate the unknown within material form. He explores these themes not only in his paintings, but also in photographs, collage works, editioned prints, and site-specific, sculptural installations. It was his large-scale portraits that first gained him acclaim from the international art world, leading to receptions of his artworks in various important museum exhibitions and biennials.

== Early life and education ==
Y.Z. Kami was born in 1956, in Tehran, Pahlavi Iran (now Iran). His first encounters with art came at an early age, as he spent time with his mother, also a portrait painter, in her studio in their family home. After high school Kami attended the University of California, Berkeley, in 1975, then received his B.A. and M.A. from the Université Paris-Sorbonne (now Paris-Sorbonne University) in Paris, France, where he studied from 1976 to 1981. While in Paris he attended the lectures of Claude Lévi-Strauss, Roland Barthes, Henry Corbin, and Emmanuel Lévinas. He then continued his education at the Conservatoire Libre du Cinema Français in Paris in 1982. However, his study of film led him to realize that he preferred a more solitary practice, and he returned to painting.

== Influences ==
After living in Paris for over a decade, Kami moved to New York in 1984, where he continues to live.

As a child, Kami traveled frequently with his family. His experiences viewing ancient architectural structures and the vast, dry desert left a significant impression on him, which he later carried out into his artwork. During his student years in Paris, Kami was profoundly interested in Lévinas's ideas regarding the human face. He considered these ideas in relation to early Egyptian Fayum mummy portraits, which he first saw at the Louvre. He has recounted that he was impressed by their "neutral expressions ... their big eyes and their otherworldliness." Other influences include 13th- and 14th-century Persian poetry, especially the writings of the Sufi poet Rumi. Konya (2007), for instance, includes several photographs from Rumi's mausoleum in Konya, where he lived and died.

Reflecting on the beginning stages of his painting, Kami explains how his foundational years merged with his interest in American art of the 1980s: "My mother was a portrait painter, so I have been painting portraits since I was a child. For many years I painted with a sitter in front of me: I would make a drawing first with pencil or charcoal on canvas and then paint with oil. Years later, in the mid-1980s, when I moved to America, I encountered Andy Warhol's very large portrait of Mao at the Metropolitan Museum of Art, and Chuck Close's large portraits, as well as Alex Katz and other American artists. And gradually I began to change the size of the heads in my paintings. Prior to that, my experiences with large portraits focused mainly on frescoes and mosaics in the churches of Europe."

Kami draws on both Eastern and Western mystical and aesthetic traditions to explore the relationship between outward forms and the inner spirit.

== Technique ==
Kami is recognized for using oil paint to achieve a dry, matte surface, similar to those of frescoes and sacred wall paintings in Byzantine and early Renaissance art. To develop this technique he spent years experimenting with oils, dry pigments, and dust. As artist/educator Grace Adam explained in The Art Channel's segment on Kami's 2015 exhibition at Gagosian Britannia Street, London, "[Kami] primes the canvas in gesso, then adds a bit of stone dust and this amazing terra cotta color - then lay[s] these beautiful colors over the top of it."

Another approach that runs throughout Kami's work is his use of repetition. For his portraits, he often paints the same subject multiple times, seeking to capture the experience of observing the sitter's face. "It's happened many times," he explains "that when I finish a painting, I often feel there is more to say."

Repetition is also a core element of Kami's Endless Prayers series of works on paper—in which poetry and sacred texts are cut into rectangular fragments and pasted into mandala formations—as well as in his Dome paintings, consisting of concentric circles of tessellated marks.

== Work and career ==
=== Portraits ===
During the 1980s Kami moved away from painting directly from life to working from sketches and photographs of each sitter. These paintings, larger than the previous portraits, rely on Kami's memory of the subjects and therefore depict the lasting impression of the encounter rather than the moment of the encounter itself. He made large-scale portraits that encourage the viewer to closely observe the human face Kami notes, "as the size of the paintings grew larger, the images became a little blurred, and gradually more and more out of focus. The blurrier they became, the more abstract the experience was for the viewer when approaching the work." Kami's portraits, based on his own photographs of family, friends, and strangers, present ordinary, introspective subjects, yet each face acts as a threshold between the sitter's impenetrable inner thoughts and the viewer's perception. In 1989, Kami traveled to Iran for the first time after many years and came across a photograph of himself taken when he was eleven. This photograph eventually became a point of reference in his work, inspiring a series of self-portrait variations. Versions of Self Portrait as a Child have since been acquired by private collectors and one work from the series, showing the portrait with a group of three women sitting at a table, is included in the permanent collection of the Guggenheim Museum.

In the 1990s, Kami painted single portraits of men and women, which scholars and critics have discussed through a lens of mourning and mortality. Untitled (1997), a single work composed of sixteen portraits, is held in the collection of the Whitney Museum of American Art, New York. The portraits, painted from photographs, recall both traditional Byzantine and Fayum portraits, as well as newspaper photographs. In his review of "Invitational Exhibition"—a group show at the American Academy of Arts and Letters, New York, in 2000—Ken Johnson wrote in the New York Times: "[T]he show's most emotionally moving work is Y. Z. Kami's big wall of portraits: blurred, warmly muted, photo-based images of 16 people exude a haunting, funereal mood. Tapping into a tradition that goes back to Roman times, Mr. Kami has produced a work that feels soberingly right for this moment in history."

Though Kami's portraits are known for their subtle, meditative qualities, the artist gained particular attention for his more political work, such as In Jerusalem (2004–05), which was included in "Think With the Senses, Feel With the Mind," curated by Robert Storr at the 52nd Biennale di Venezia in Italy. The work depicts five prominent religious leaders – a Catholic cardinal, an Eastern Orthodox bishop, Sephardic and Ashkenazi rabbis, and a Sunni imam – who came together in 2005 in fierce opposition to a gay pride march to be held in Jerusalem. Kami extracted the figures from a photograph featured on the front page of the New York Times. In Storr's essay "Every Time I Feel the Spirit...", he credits Kami "with gentle audacity for accepting the challenge of limning credible contemporary images of prayer—including several of clasped hands raised in adoration and/or entreaty—and, so, under current art world conditions, for the exceptional courage of his convictions."

In recent large-scale portraits, Kami emphasizes the process behind the paintings, at times emphasizing or inventing individual features, as in Man with Violet Eyes (2013–14). He has also shifted from representing his subjects with soft, blurred gazes, to showing them with eyes closed, heightening their introspective, emotional distance. As Steven Henry Madoff has written about these works, "We climb across the knowable into a state of expectation and suspension in which we open ourselves to the possibility of an immaterial presence, a link to mere Being." In this way, the paintings' focal points are not the eyes, as is the case in traditional portraits, but rather the entire face, emanating as a single, enveloping presence. "When you go through the process of looking at a face and you meditate on it with pigments and brushes in hand," Kami says "it is like living with the face. In a way, it becomes part of you."

After these portraits were shown at Gagosian in New York and London, Jackie Wullschlager in The Financial Times wrote that they "are full of the paradoxes which make him one of today's most intriguing conceptual painters." Praise also came from Laura Cumming of The Guardian who wrote: "It is obvious from these paintings, Kami is prodigiously aware of the limitations of portraiture. Yet it is obvious from these paintings, with their intense aspect of interiority, of trying to make visible the invisible, that he is thinking about this dimension of our lives as few other contemporary painters. So although his portraits are by nature impermeable, resistant to emotional communion, they are also candidly open in their monumental scale."

=== Endless Prayers ===
Though he is most captivated by the human face and what it means to represent it, Kami has also explored mixed media work and abstraction, using these forms to further examine themes of light, infinity, and the act of looking.

The Endless Prayer works are mixed-media collages on paper, inspired by architectural designs. These works—made by gluing minute brick-shaped cutouts from Persian, Arabic, Aramaic, and Hebrew texts into circles—recall the ritual of prayer and the mosaics of sacred architecture, and the brick patterns of domes in particular. Though Kami had been producing Endless Prayer works on paper for a decade prior, he exhibited them for the first time at Parasol Unit Foundation for Contemporary Art in London, John Berggruen Gallery, Gagosian, and the Sackler Gallery, Smithsonain Institution, in 2008.

Y.Z. Kami created Rumi, the Book of Shams e Tabrizi (In Memory of Mahin Tajadod) for the 9th International Istanbul Biennial in 2005. He cut blocks from gray soapstone, then, in lithographic ink, he stamped them with the original Persian verses of a poem by Rumi. The poem is a rhythmic, repetitive incantation: "Come to me, come to me my beloved, my beloved/ Enter, enter into my work, into my work!" The sculpture consists of twelve circles made up of individual stone blocks, and can be arranged in two different ways: either in concentric circles around an area of white salt referring to a white light; or as separate circles, each keeping its original diameter from the concentric arrangement, but installed as individual rings.

=== Domes ===
The Endless Prayer works led to the Dome paintings, in which, instead of text, Kami uses color and shape to refer to mosaics and architecture, applying brick-like dabs of paint in concentric rings, leaving the center either dark or light. Ongoing since the mid-2000s, Kami's Domes have been produced in blue, black, white, and gold. Paul Richard of The Washington Post writes of this series: "Peering at that picture is like standing with your face upright underneath a punctured dome, say, the Pantheon's in Rome, or that of some Turkish mosque, looking through the oculus, which interrupts the masonry high above your head and lets you see, beyond, the brightness of the sky." The Domes offer an abstract counterpoint to Kami's portraits, bringing ideas as diverse as architecture, light, prayer, meditation, and minimalism into a single act of repetition. When asked about the Dome paintings in relation to his other work Kami states, "The connection is through light. There is an experience of light in the portraits, as if the sitter is coming out of light or going into light. And in the White Domes, it's also very much about that experience of light."

The Domes have been featured in numerous solo exhibitions, including "Y.Z. Kami: Paintings" (Gagosian New York in 2014, and Gagosian London in 2015), "Endless Prayers" (Los Angeles County Museum of Art in 2016–17), as well as at Gagosian Paris in 2018. As Robert Storr writes on the Dome paintings, "Composed of nested concentric rings of brick-like lozenges that evoke the domes and cupolas of churches, mosques, and temples, these panels are dilating and contracting mandalas for the contemplation of unfettered minds." Through these abstract paintings, Kami continues to explore that which might not be discernible or visible to human eyes.

=== Hands ===
In addition to the portraits and Domes, Kami began creating paintings of hands in 1987. While he initially depicted individual hands, since 2012 the hands in Kami's paintings are typically posed in a manner associated with prayer, and are rendered with the same nuance and concentration as the portraits. Kami explains how meditation is present in the portraits, light is present in the domes, and faith is present in the hands. He does not limit the association of faith to one religion. The bare hands engaged in prayer are a universal image for faith and contemplation of the unknown.

=== Night Paintings ===
Continuing in the abstract nature of the Dome paintings and in his practice of exploring the boundaries of light, Kami's tenebrous Night Paintings (2017-present) are composed largely from a single shade of indigo mixed with various gradations of white.

Kami's paintings depict the boundaries between the earthly and the sublime. Informed by his cultural heritage yet resolutely cosmopolitan and secular, Kami's oeuvre communicates a philosophical and spiritual reflectiveness. At the same time, he visually obscures and anonymizes his subjects, preferring to approach broader questions of the infinite and the ineffable rather than delving into the specifics of a religious existence. Kami's Night Paintings have been exhibited in "Y.Z. Kami: Night Paintings". Here, Kami engages in a push and pull between abstraction and figuration, further confounding the viewer's attempts to recognize elements from the human realm.

== Exhibitions and collections ==
Kami's work is in the collections of the Metropolitan Museum of Art, New York; Museum of Modern Art, New York; Whitney Museum of American Art, New York; Solomon R. Guggenheim Museum, New York; and British Museum, London, among others. Exhibitions include The Watchful Portraits of Y.Z. Kami, Herbert F. Johnson Museum of Art, Cornell University, Ithaca, New York (2003); 52nd Biennale di Venezia (2007); Perspectives: Y.Z. Kami, Arthur M. Sackler Gallery, Smithsonian Institution, Washington, DC (2008); Endless Prayers, Parasol unit foundation for contemporary art, London (2008–09); Beyond Silence, National Museum of Contemporary Art Athens (2009–10); and Endless Prayers, Los Angeles County Museum of Art (2016–17). De forma silenciosa/In a Silent Way, a midcareer survey of Kami's work, was presented by Museo de Arte Contemporáneo de Castilla y León, Spain in 2022–23. Light, Gaze, Presence was organized across four locations in Florence, Italy, in 2023: Museo di Palazzo Vecchio, Museo Novecento, Museo degli Innocenti, and Abbazia di San Miniato al Monte.

== Exhibitions ==
=== Selected solo exhibitions ===
- 2026 Y.Z. Kami. Peter Marino Art Foundation, Southhampton, NY.
- 2025: Y.Z. Kami: The Domes. Gagosian, Beverly Hills, CA.
- 2023: Y.Z. Kami: Night and Day. Gagosian, 555 West 24th St. New York, NY
- 2023 Y.Z. Kami: Light, Gaze, Presence. Museo di Palazzo Vecchio, Museo Novecento, Museo degli Innocenti, Abbazzia di San Miniato al Monte
- 2022-23 Y.Z. Kami: De forma silenciosa/In a Silent Way. Museo de Arte Contemporáneo de Castilla y León (MUSAC), León, Spain.
- 2020 Y.Z. Kami: Night Paintings. Gagosian Gallery, Rome, Italy.
- 2018 Y.Z. Kami: Geometry of Light. Gagosian Gallery, Paris, France.
- 2016–17 Y.Z. Kami: Endless Prayers. Los Angeles County Museum of Art (LACMA), Los Angeles, CA.
- 2015 Y.Z. Kami: Paintings. Gagosian Gallery, Britannia Street, London, England.
- 2014 Y.Z. Kami: Paintings. Gagosian Gallery, Madison Avenue, New York, NY.
- 2009 Y.Z. Kami: Beyond Silence. National Museum of Contemporary Art, EMST, Athens, Greece.
- 2008 Y.Z. Kami: Endless Prayers. Parasol Unit Foundation for Contemporary Art, London, England.
  - Perspectives: Y.Z. Kami. Arthur M. Sackler Gallery, Smithsonian Institution, Washington D.C.
  - Y.Z. Kami. John Berggruen Gallery, San Francisco, CA.
  - Y.Z. Kami. Gagosian Gallery, Beverly Hills, CA.
- 2003 Portraits by Y.Z. Kami. Herbert F. Johnson Museum of Art, Cornell University, Ithaca, NY.
- 2002 Martin Weinstein, Minneapolis, MN.
- 2001 Deitch Projects, New York, NY.
- 1999 Dry Land. Deitch Projects, New York, NY.
- 1998 Y.Z. Kami. Deitch Projects, New York, NY.
- 1996 Holly Solomon Gallery, New York, NY.
- 1993 Barbara Toll Fine Arts, New York, NY.
- 1992 Long Beach Museum of Art, CA.
  - Barbara Toll Fine Arts, New York, NY.
- 1984 L.T.M. Gallery, New York, NY.
