= Mohammad Radvand =

Iranian artist

Mohammad Radvand (Persian: محمد رادوند, born in 1956, also known as Michael Radvand), is an Iranian modernist artist. Radvand's works have been featured in galleries both in the United States and Iran, such as the Tehran Museum of Contemporary Art and Tehran Art Center.
