= Hossein Zenderoudi =

Iranian painter and printmaker (b. 1937)

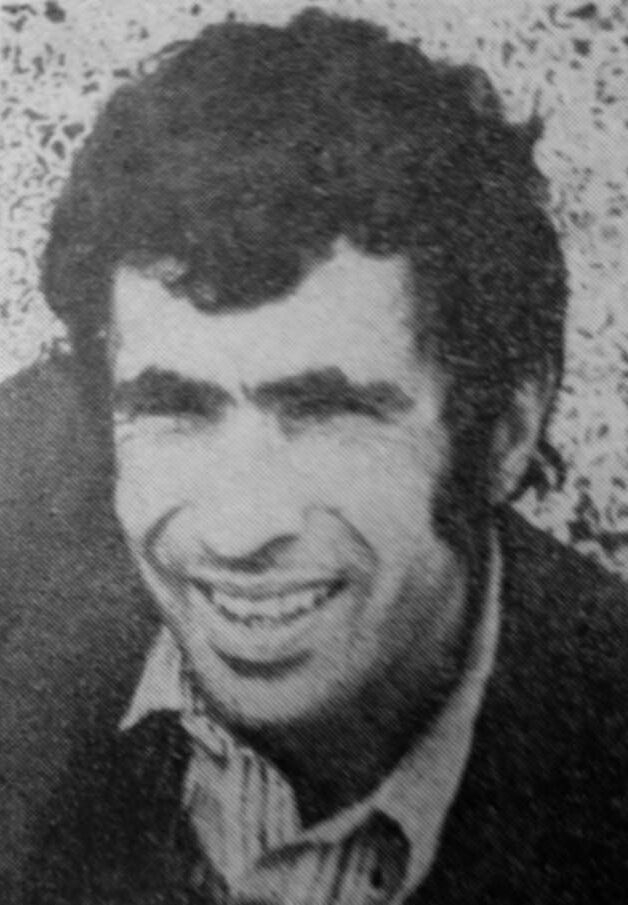
- Born: 11 March 1937 (age 89); Tehran, Imperial State of Iran
- Other names: Hoseyn Zenderoudi, Charles Hossein Zenderoudi
- Education: University of Tehran
- Known for: Painting, drawing, sculpture, printmaking, ceramics, tapestry
- Movement: Saqqakhaneh movement
- Relatives: Barbara Pravi (granddaughter)
- Website: zenderoudi.com

Charles Hossein Zenderoudi (Persian: (شارل) حسین زنده‌رودی; born 11 March 1937) is a French-Iranian painter, calligrapher and sculptor, known as a pioneer of Iranian modern art and as one of the earliest artists to incorporate Persian calligraphy elements into his artwork. He is a pioneer of the Saqqakhaneh School of Art, a genre of neo-traditional modern art founded in Iran that is rooted in the history of Persian coffee-house paintings and Persian Shia visual elements. He lives in Paris and New York.

== Biography ==
Hossein Zenderoudi was born in Tehran, Iran, on 11 March 1937.

Zenderoudi attended the Tehran College of Decorative Arts in the 1950s to study painting and calligraphy. He was active in the arts community in Iran, through his membership of art groups between 1958 and 1960, he became one of the key figures of the Saqqakhaneh School of Art, which explored the use of Persian Shia popular visual elements and calligraphy in art. He influenced generations of artists internationally.

After winning an award at the 2nd annual Tehran Painting Biennial in 1960, he moved in 1961 to Paris, France, and later became a French national.

Zenderoudi’s granddaughter is the French singer-songwriter, Barbara Pravi, who represented France at the Eurovision Song Contest 2021, finishing 2nd place.

== Work ==
=== Collections ===
Hossein Zenderoudi's artwork held in permanent museum collections:

- K+L+32+H+4. Mon père et moi (My Father and I) (1962), mixed-media on board, The Museum of Modern Art (MoMA), New York City, New York
- Miuz Skfe (1971), oil on canvas, Centre Georges Pompidou, Paris. France
- The Hand (1960-1961), mixed-media collage, Grey Art Gallery at New York University (NYU), New York City, New York
- Yee-Kga-Bas, painting on canvas, musée Bertrand, Châteauroux, France.
- Who is this Hossein the world is crazy about? (1958), linocut print on linen, British Museum, London, United Kingdom, acquired by the museum in 2011

== Awards ==
- 1958 – Prize at the Paris Biennial
- 1964 – Cagnes-sur-Mer prize
- 1959 – Award of the Iran-America Society, Tehran
- 1961 – Laureate of the Paris Biennial, France
- 1962 – Laureate of the Venice Biennale, Italy

== See also ==
- Iranian modern and contemporary art
