= Ghasem Hajizadeh =

- قاسم حاجی‌زاده
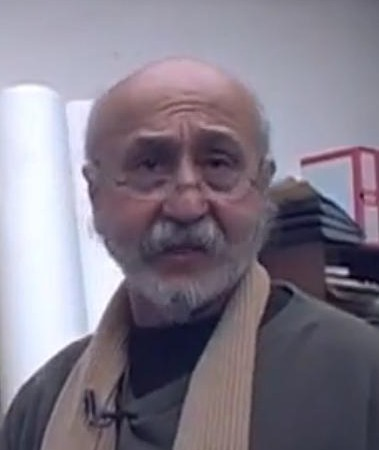
- Hajizadeh in his atelier in Paris
- Born: Ghasem Hajizadeh; April 1, 1947; Lahijan, Iran
- Education: University of Tehran
- Known for: Abstract, Figurative Painting
- Movement: Pop art

Ghasem Hajizadeh (b. April 1, 1947; in Lahijan, Iran, Persian: قاسم حاجی‌زاده) is an Iranian–French painter and a pioneering Pop art figure in contemporary Iranian art.

Forced into exile after the 1979 revolution, he currently lives in Paris.

== Biography ==
Hajizadeh was born in 1947 in Lahijan, north of Iran. He received his diploma in arts from Tehran High School of Fine Arts in 1967 and soon after started his art career. During his early years of work, Hajizadeh's works were mostly abstract. However, after contacts and friendship with Ardeshir Mohasses, he changed his style and concentrated on figurative art. During the 1960s and early 1970s, Mohasses encouraged him to pursue pop art movement, which was thriving in the United States. In 1972, Hajizadeh participated in the first art exhibition, held by Iran–America Society.

While he held several solo and group exhibitions inside and outside post-revolution Iran, after establishment of the Islamic Republic, he could no longer run any public exhibitions for his work. In 1986, he fled to France, living and working in Paris. During his career in arts, his works have been on shown on galleries and museum around the world, such as Tehran museum of contemporary art, Seol museum of contemporary art, and Bangladesh national museum.
