= Reza Mafi =

Iranian calligrapher (1943–1982)

- رضا مافی
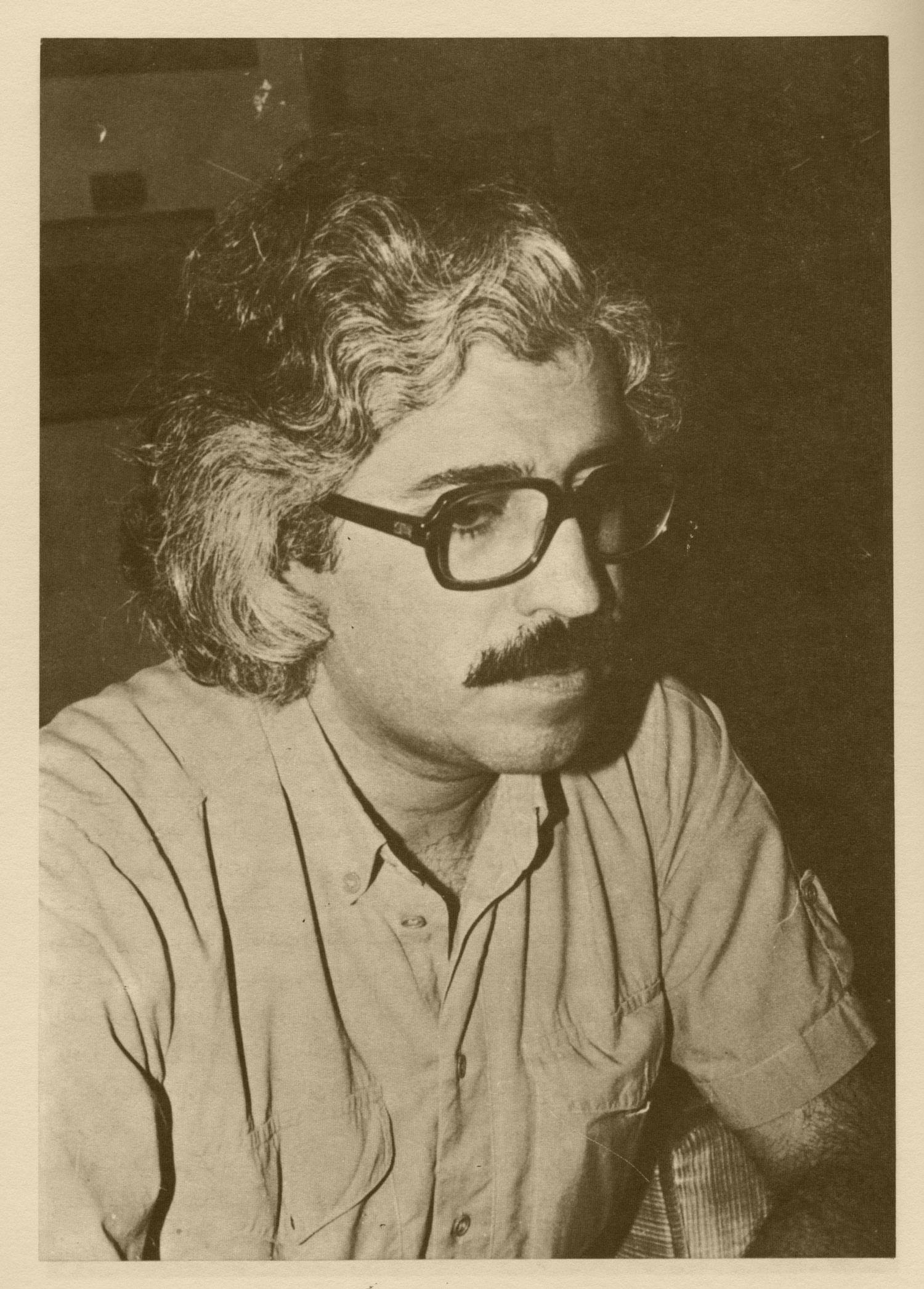
- Born: 27 November 1943; Mashhad, Iran
- Died: 26 September 1982 (aged 38); Tehran, Pahlavi Iran
- Resting place: Shah Abdol-Azim Shrine
- Other names: Sadr al-Kitab
- Occupations: Calligrapher, painter
- Movement: Saqqakhaneh

Reza Mafi (Persian: رضا مافی; 27 November 1943 – 26 September 1982) was an Iranian contemporary calligrapher and painter. He was a pioneer of Iranian modernism. He was nicknamed "Sadr al-Kitab" (lit. 'beginning of a book').

== Life and career ==
Reza Mafi was born on 27 November 1943, in Mashhad, Pahlavi Iran (now Iran). His elder brother Mohammad Mafi was a painter. Mafi studied under the apprenticeship of Persian calligrapher Jalal ed-Din Etezadi. He continued his studies for another four years under Hossein Mirkhani, a professor at the Society of Iranian Calligraphists.

Mafi was one of the earliest artists to explore modern calligraphic painting in Iran (also known as naqashi-khat).
