= Nasser Ovissi =

Iranian-born American painter (born 1934)

- ناصر اویسی
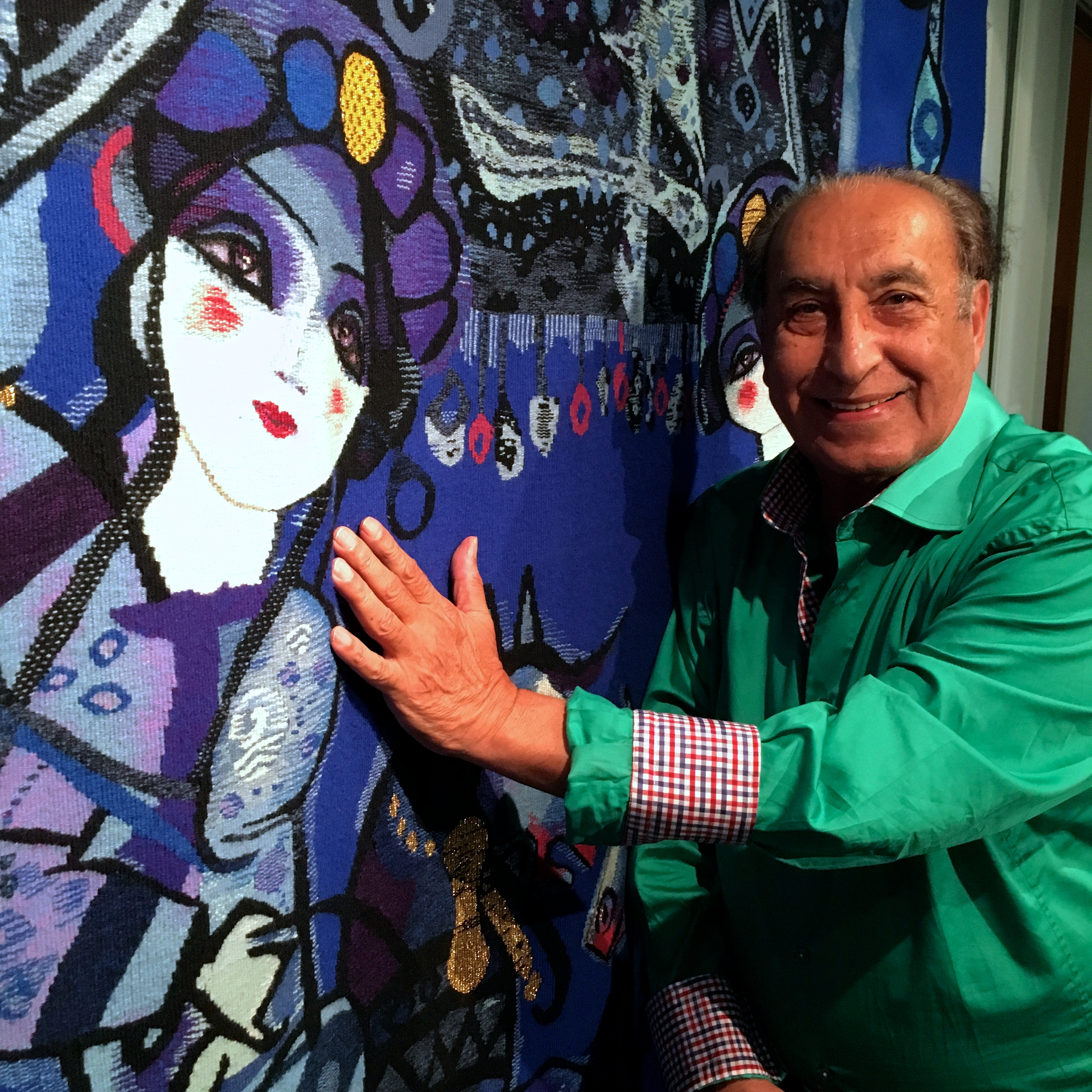
- Nasser Ovissi, 2017
- Born: 1934 (age 91–92); Tehran, Pahlavi Iran (now Iran)
- Other name: Nāṣir Uvaysī
- Occupations: Painter, printmaker, ceramicist
- Movement: Saqqakhaneh
- Website: www.galleryovissi.com

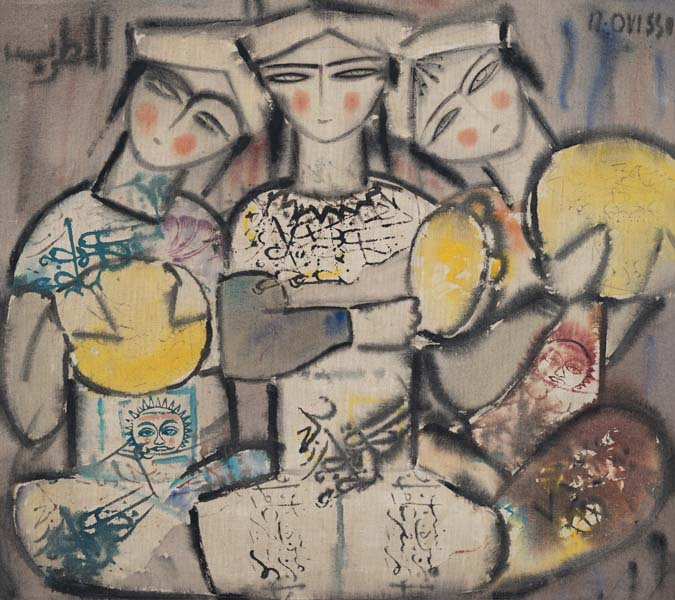
Daf Auction, July 2017

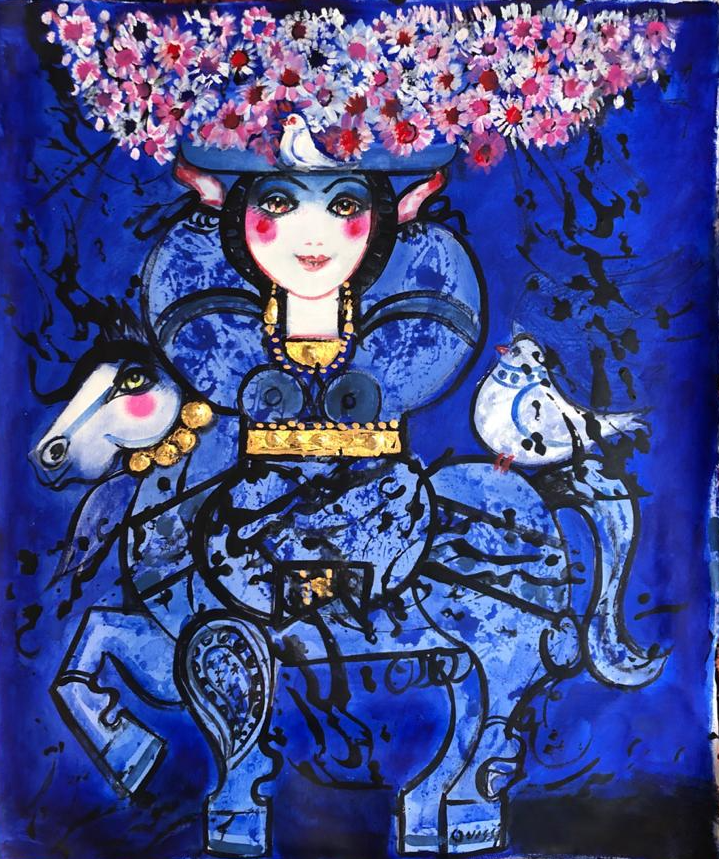
Blue Lady Dove

Nasser Ovissi (Persian: ناصر اویسی; born 1934) is an Iranian-born American painter, and printmaker, associated with the Saqqakhaneh movement. He is one of the pioneers of Iranian modern art. Ovissi lives in Reston, Virginia.

== Life and career ==
Nasser Ovissi was born in 1934, in Tehran, Pahlavi Iran (now Iran). He graduated with a B.A. degree in 1956 in law and political science from the University of Tehran. He later studied art in Rome.

His first exhibition was held in 1956 in Tehran. Due to the Iranian Revolution, Ovissi moved to the United States. Ovissi has work in museum collections, including at the North Carolina Museum of Art in Raleigh.
