= Bahman Jalali =

Iranian photographer

- بهمن جلالی
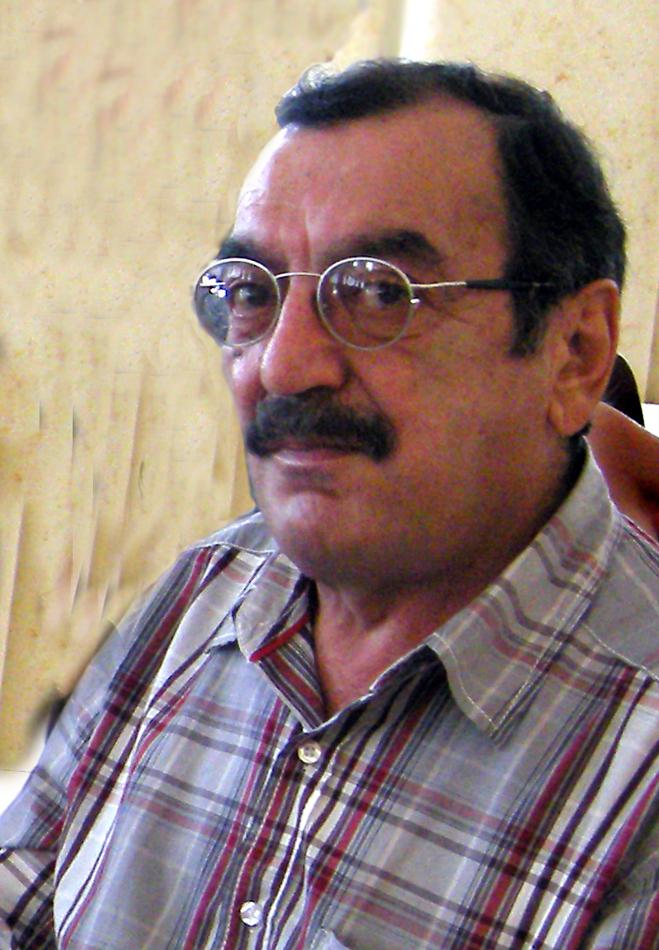
- Born: 1944 |12|21; Tehran, Iran
- Died: 2010 |01|15; Tehran, Iran
- Spouse: Rana Javadi

Bahman Jalali (1944 – 15 January 2010) was an Iranian photographer who played a significant role in educating a new generation of Iranian photographers such as Shadi Ghadirian, Peyman Hooshmandzadeh, Hasan Sarbakhshian Mehdi Vosoughnia and ext. He taught photography at several universities in Iran over a 30-year period.

Jalali's work is held in the collections of the British Museum and Los Angeles County Museum of Art.

== Career ==
Jalali graduated with a degree in Economics from Melli University in Tehran, then started his career as a photographer with Tamasha Magazine in 1972. In 1974 he joined the Royal Photographic Society in Great Britain. He is best known for his documentary photographs from the Iranian Revolution in 1979 and from the Iran–Iraq War, but after the revolution he focused more on teaching photography at Iranian universities than practicing it. Jalali was a founding member and curator at the Museum of Photography in Tehran (also known as Akskhaneh Shahr), Iran's first museum of photography.

His last work was a photo series called "Image of Imaginations", which took three years (2003–

2006) for him to complete. It was a mixture of flowers or Iranian calligraphy with old photographs drawn from Iranian photographic history. Jalali later explained: "I have been exposed to many images by little known photographers around the country. Those that I could keep, I have held as mementos, and others have left their marks on my imagination." The Musée d'Arts de Nantes in Nantes, France bought this photo series for its collection.

Jalali was given an homage for his forty-year career in photography by the Fundació Antoni Tàpies in Barcelona with a solo exhibition curated by Catherine David from September to December 2007 and the publication of a monograph. He was a contributor to the exhibition in the British Museum, London, Word into Art : Artists of the Modern Middle East in 2006.

Until the end of his life, Jalali was a member of the editorial board for Aksnameh, a bi-monthly journal of photography in Tehran.

== Death ==
Jalali was being treated for pancreatic cancer in Germany. He returned to his home in Tehran on 14 January 2010 and died the next morning at the age of 65.

== Personal life ==
Jalali was the husband of photographer Rana Javadi.

== Publications ==
- Days of Blood, Days of Fire. Tehran: Zamineh, 1979.
  - Leipzig: Spector, 2020. ISBN 978-3940064455. With essays in Persian and English. 35 photographs by Jalali, 16 by Rana Javadi, and some by others.
- Bahman Jalali. Barcelona: Fundaciò Antoni Tàpies, 2007. Edited by Cathérine David. ISBN 978-8488786326. 296 pages. Published on the occasion of an exhibition.
- Anahita Ghabaian Etehadieh, sous la direction de, "La photographie iranienne, Un regard sur la création contemporaine" (L'Atelier d'édition-Loco/Silk Road Gallery, 2011). 191 pages.
- The Familiar Stranger. Tehran: Nazar, 2021. ISBN 9786001523113. With essays in Persian and English.

== Collections ==
Jalali's work is held in the following permanent collections:

- British Museum, London: 1 print (as of July 2021)
- Los Angeles County Museum of Art, Los Angeles: 2 prints (as of July 2021)

== Awards ==
- 2011: Stiftung Niedersachsen Spectrum International Award for Photography, Sprengel Museum, Hannover
