= Mohammad Ehsai =

Iranian calligrapher, painter and graphic designer

- محمد احصایی
- Born: 29 June 1939 (age 87); Qazvin, Iran
- Education: Faculty of Fine Arts, University of Tehran
- Known for: Calligraphy, painting and graphic design
- Movement: Iranian calligraphic painting

Seyed Mohammad Ehsai (Persian: سیدمحمد احصایی; born 29 June 1939) is an Iranian calligrapher, painter, graphic designer and university tutor. He is regarded as one of the pioneers of modern Iranian calligraphic painting, commonly known in Persian as naqqashi-khatt, in which Persian and Arabic letterforms are treated as visual and abstract elements.

== Life and career ==
Ehsai was born in Qazvin and moved with his family to Tehran at the age of six. He developed an early interest in Persian calligraphy and later studied with the calligrapher Gholam Hossein Amirkhani. Before entering university, he taught literature and calligraphy in Tehran schools and worked as a calligrapher and graphic designer for the Iranian Red Lion and Sun Society and the national textbook organisation.

He studied painting and graphic design at the Faculty of Fine Arts of the University of Tehran. He later joined its academic staff and introduced courses examining the graphic and visual qualities of calligraphy. He also taught at other Iranian art institutions.

== Work ==
Ehsai's work combines the discipline of traditional Persian and Islamic calligraphy with the compositional principles of modern painting and graphic design. His paintings often enlarge, repeat or interlace letters until their linguistic meaning becomes secondary to rhythm, colour and form.

His non-traditional works have commonly been divided into two principal groups: his calligraphic paintings and the series known as the Eternal Alphabet. In these works, individual words and letters are transformed into monumental abstract structures, frequently painted in bright colours against dark backgrounds.

Ehsai has also produced traditional calligraphy in scripts including Nastaʿlīq, shekasteh nastaʿlīq, thuluth and muhaqqaq. His major calligraphic projects include manuscripts of the Divan of Hafez and the Quran.

His work is represented in the collection of the British Museum and in several Iranian public collections.

== See also ==
- Morteza Momayyez
- Amrollah Farhadi
