= Rana Javadi =

- رعنا جوادی
- Born: 1953 (age 72–73)
- Known for: Photography
- Spouse: Bahman Jalali

Rana Javadi (b.1953; Persian: رعنا جوادی) is an Iranian photographer and museum founder.

== Early life and education ==
Self-taught Iranian photographer, Rana Javadi began working as the Director of Photo and Pictorial Studies at the Cultural Research Bureau in Tehran in 1989. From 1997 to 1999 she was a founding member of Askhaneh-Shahr, Iran's first museum of photography; she is also on the editorial board of the photography journal Aksnameh. During her career she has exhibited widely both in Iran and abroad. Her work includes the series "When You Were Dying", in which she takes old studio photographs from Iran and uses them as the basis for photocollages involving fabrics, flowers, and other items. She has also been active as a documentary photographer, chronicling the Iranian Revolution and the Iran-Iraq War. Javadi is the widow of photographer Bahman Jalali.

One work by Javadi, an untitled 1978 photograph from the series "Days of Blood, Days of Fire", is currently in the collection of the Arthur M. Sackler Gallery of the Smithsonian Institution.
