= Behjat Sadr =

Iranian female painter 1924–2009

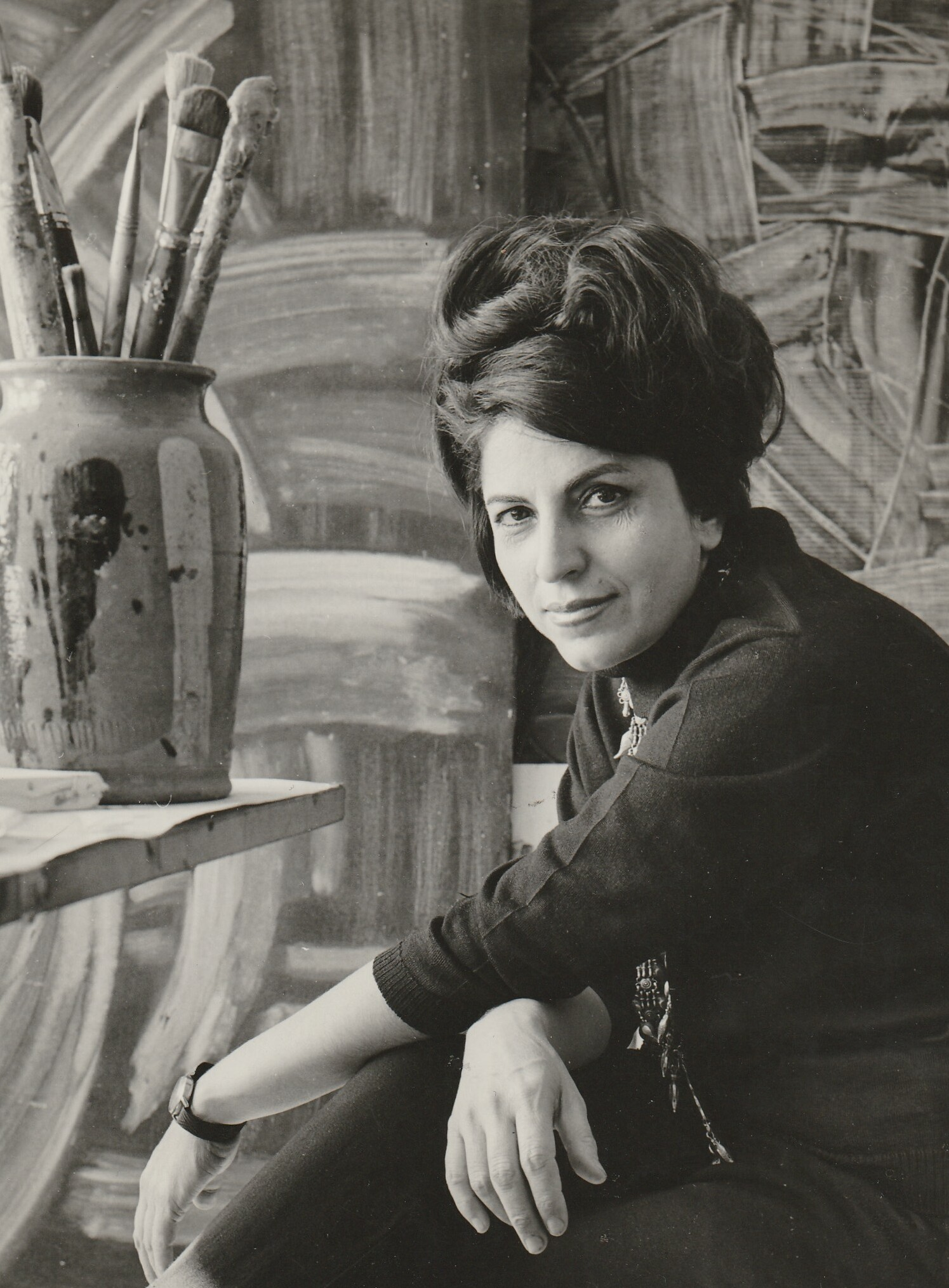
- Born: Behjat Sadr; 29 May 1924; Arak, Sublime State of Iran
- Died: 10 August 2009 (aged 85); Corsica, France
- Known for: Painting
- Movement: Abstraction
- Spouse: Morteza Hannaneh
- Children: 1

Behjat Sadr (Persian: بهجت صدر; 29 May 1924 – 10 August 2009) was an Iranian modernist painter whose works have been exhibited in New York, Paris, and Rome. She was known for applying paint with a palette knife to canvas and metallic surfaces, creating compositions characterised by visual rhythm, movement, and geometric forms.

== Biography ==
Behjat Sadr was born in Arak, Iran on 29 May 1924. After her studies at the Faculty of Fine Arts at the University of Tehran, she obtained a scholarship to Italy, where she attended the Accademia di Belle Arti in Rome and the Accademia di Belle Arti di Napoli in Naples.

Soon after arriving in Rome, she abandoned academic painting for an abstract approach. Sadr's first major exhibition was at the Gallery La Bussola in Roma in 1958. She had participated a year before at the twenty-eighth Venice Biennale in 1956 and won the second prize of San Vito Romano. During her years in Rome, her friendship with the Persian poet Forugh Farrokhzad, who had been her student in Tehran, deepened. In Rome, she also met her second husband, the Persian composer, Morteza Hannaneh, whom she married in 1975 and with whom she had her only child, Kakuti (Mitra) Hannaneh.

In 1957, Sadr decided to return to the University of Tehran as a professor, despite opportunities to continue her painting in Rome and Paris. She continued teaching in Tehran for almost 20 years.

Awarded the Royal Grand Prize at theTehran Biennale 1962, she participated in international art fairs like the Venice Biennale and Sao Paulo Biennale and in many personal and group exhibitions. She spent two years in Paris on sabbatical in 1968 and 1975.

In 1980, one year after the Iranian Revolution, Sadr and her daughter moved to Paris.

== Style and methods ==
After encountering Art Informel and Abstract expressionism in Italy, Sadr developed all-over compositions made from repeated, curving strokes. During the late 1960s she also explored optical and kinetic effects, including installations made with painted Venetian blinds. For paintings such as the 1974 Untitled held by the Centre Pompidou, she poured industrial paint onto supports placed on the floor and then removed or reshaped it with broad knives. The surrounding unpainted areas helped give her dark abstract forms a more sculptural appearance.

== Death and legacy ==
Sadr was diagnosed with breast cancer in the 1980s but continued to paint. She died of a heart attack on 10 August 2009, aged 85, while swimming in Corsica. In several of her writings, she had expressed a wish to die at sea.

Sadr has been described as the first Iranian woman painter of her generation to achieve recognition equal to that of her male contemporaries.

In 2006, Sadr was the subject of a documentary film called Behjat Sadr: Time Suspended, directed by Mitra Farahani. This film includes footage of the artist at work, as well as extensive interviews.

The Behjat Sadr Endowment Fund, Fonds de Dotation Behjat Sadr, was established in 2020 to protect and enhance the artist's work.

== Solo exhibitions ==
- 1957: Il Pincio Gallery, Rome, Italy
- 1958: La Bussola, Rome, Italy
- 1963: Borghese Gallery, Tehran, Iran
- 1967: Seyhoun Gallery, Tehran, Iran
- 1975: Cyrus Gallery, Paris, France
- 1977: Iranian-American Cultural Center, Tehran, Iran
- 1983: Cité internationale des arts, Paris, France
- 1984: Darial Gallery, Paris, France
- 1985: Farhang-Sara Cultural Center, Tehran, Iran
- 1994: Nia cultural Center, Tehran, Iran
- 2004: Tehran Museum of Contemporary Art, Tehran, Iran
- 2008: Golestan Gallery, Tehran, Iran
- 2008: Frederic Lacroix Gallery, Paris, France
- 2010: Frederic Lacroix Gallery, Paris France
- 2018: The Mosaic Rooms, London, UK
- 2019: Balice Hertling Gallery, Paris, France
- 2022: Balice Hertling Gallery, Paris, France
- 2023: "Behjat SADR", IAIA IAIA, New York, USA

== Group exhibitions ==
- 1956: Venice Biennale, Venice, Italy
- 1957: Venice Biennale, Venice, Italy
- 1957: Galleria Il Pincio, Rome, Italy
- 1962: Venice Biennale, Venice, Italy
- 1962: The 3rd Tehran Painting Biennale, Tehran, Iran
- 1962: São Paulo Art Biennale, São Paulo, Brazil
- 1987: Iranian Contemporary Art: Four Women, Foxley Leach Gallery, Washington DC
- 1992: Columbia University, New York, USA
- 1992: Tehran Museum of Contemporary Art, Tehran, Iran
- 2002: "Between Word and Image, Modern Iranian Visual Culture", Gray Art Gallery, New York, USA
- 2013: "Modernités Plurielles de 1905 à 1970", Centre Pompidou, Musée National d'Art Moderne, Paris, France
- 2013: "Iran Modern", Asia Society, New York, USA
- 2014: "Unedited History. Iran 1960-2014", Musée d'Art Moderne de Paris, Paris, France
- 2015: "Unedited History. Iran 1960-2014", MAXXI, Rome, Italy
- 2021: "Epic Iran", Victoria and Albert Museum, London, UK
- 2023: Action, Gesture, Paint: Women Artists and Global Abstraction 1940-1970, Whitechapel Gallery, London, UK and Fondation Vincent van Gogh Arles, Arles, France

== See also ==
- List of Iranian women artists
