= Karim Emami =

- Born: May 26, 1930; Calcutta, India
- Died: July 9, 2005 (aged 75); Tehran, Iran
- Known for: Translator, editor, and lexicographer

Karim Emami (Persian: کریم امامی) (26 May 1930, Calcutta, India – 9 July 2005, Tehran, Iran) was an Iranian translator, editor, lexicographer, and literary critic.

== Life ==
Emami was born in 1930 in Calcutta, a frequent destination of his father, a tea merchant. He learned his first English words from his father and returned to Shiraz in Iran when he was two years old.

Emami studied English literature at University of Tehran and at the University of Minnesota. He became a journalist in the early 1950s for the English language Tehran daily Keyhan International. During the 1960s, he translated contemporary Persian poetry into English. In 1967, he was named editor in chief at Franklin Books, where he was instrumental in the publication of quality books and training younger writers and editors. He also founded Soroush Press, the publishing arm of National Iranian Radio and Television, and established the Zamineh bookstore in Tehran, a meeting place for writers, intellectuals, and book lovers.

In the final decade of his life he was an active contributor to Motarjem, an Iranian quarterly dedicated to translation and translators. He was responsible for Kargahe Tarjome (translation workshops) section of the magazine. He died of leukemia in Tehran.

== Selected works ==
=== Books in Persian ===
- Payāmi dar rāh: Naẓari be šeʿr va naqqāši-e Sepehri, (A message on the way: A collection of three essays by Dāriuš Āšuri, Ḥosayn Maʿṣoumi Hamedani and Karim Emami), ed. Karim Emami, Tehran, 1980.
- ʿAkkāsi-e siāh o sefid (Black-and-white photography), Karim Emami et al., Tehran, 1981.
- Panj negāh be ḵāk (Five ways of looking at the earth), a collection of 63 pictures by five Iranian photographers: Mehdi Ḵᵛānsāri, Bahman Jalāli, Yaḥyā Dehqānpur, Mahšid Farahmand, and Karim Emami), ed., Karim Emami, Tehran, 1982.
- Čeguna film-e ʿarusaki besāzim (How to make animated movies), Karim Emami et al., Tehran, 2000.

=== Translations into Persian ===
- Arthur Charles Clarke, Man and Space (1968), as Ensān o fażā, Tehran, 1970.
- Arthur Conan Doyle, The Adventures of Sherlock Holmes, as Mājarāhā-ye Sherlock Holmes (1993–1998), 4 vols.
- Scott Fitzgerald, The Great Gatsby (1925), as Gatsbi-e bozorg (Ṭalā va ḵākestar), Tehran, 1965.
- Alex La Guma, Apartheid, ed., Tehran, 1981.
- David Lodge, Graham Greene (1966), Tehran, 1974.
- John Osborne, Look Back in Anger (1956), as Bā ḵašm be yād ār, Tehran, 1963.
- Herbert Read, A Concise History of Modern Painting (1956–74), as Tāriḵča-ye naqqāši-e novin, forthcoming.
- Sir Denis Wright, The Persians Amongst the English (1985), as Irāniān dar miān-e Engelisihā, Tehran, 1987.

=== Translations into English ===
- Jalal Al-e Ahmad, “Crisis in Education: The School Principal,” Michael Hillmann, ed. Iranian Society: An Anthology of Writings by Jalal Al-e Ahmad, Kentucky, 1988, pp. 80–88.
- Forugh Farrokhzad, “Another Birth,” Michael Hillmann, ed. A Lonely Woman: Forugh Farrokhzad and Her Poetry, Washington D. C., 1987, pp. 111–13.
- Omar Khayyam (72 quatrains), The Wine of Nishapur: A Photographer’s Promenade in the Rubaiyat of Omar Khayyam, Paris, 1988.
- Sohrab Sepehri, “Water’s Footsteps,” Iranian Studies, 15/1-4, 1982, pp. 97–116. Idem, The Lover is Always Alone, Tehran, 2003.

=== Compilation of exhibition catalogues ===
- Art in Iran (Iran–America Society, Tehran, 1965)
- A Collection of Saqqā-ḵāna Paintings (Iran-America Society, Tehran, 1967)
- Modern Iranian Art: A Retrospective Exhibition (Iran-America Society, Tehran, 1976).

=== Art and literary essays ===
- “Crucial Test for Iranian Cinema,” (August 12, 1964, p. 6)
- “Contemporary Iranian Literature in the Mirror,” (May 21, 1965, p. 5)
- “An Eyeful of Art in Goethe’s Garden,” (June 6, 1968, p. 6)
- “Contemporary Iranian Literature in the Mirror,” (May 21, 1965, p. 5).

== Sources ==
- Karim Emami, Az Past va Boland e Tarjome, Vol 1, Tehran:Niloofar, 2006 (5th Impression).
