= Siah Armajani =

American artist (1939–2020)

- Born: Siavash Armajani; 10 July 1939; Lahijan, Imperial State of Iran
- Died: 27 August 2020 (aged 81); Minneapolis, United States
- Awards: Knight Fellow Award (US Artists), Chevalier of the Ordre des Arts et des Lettres, McKnight Foundation

Siavash "Siah" Armajani (Persian: سیاوش ارمجانی; 10 July 1939 – 27 August 2020) was an Iranian-born American sculptor and architect known for his public art.

== Family and education ==
Siavash Armajani was born into a wealthy, educated family of textile merchants in 1939 in Tehran, Iran. He attended a Presbyterian missionary school. He thought that his grandmother was the influence that started his political activism. He began his art career making small collages in the late 1950s, visually mirroring Persian miniatures and political posters, to spread his vision of democracy and secularism and to publicize his party the National Front.

After the monarch Shah Mohammad Reza Pahlavi came to power, in order to protect him, his family ordered him overseas in 1960. Armajani immigrated to the United States, where his uncle, Yahya Armajani, was chair of the history department at Macalester College. There he studied art and philosophy, making Saint Paul, Minnesota, his permanent home. He met his wife at Macalester and he and Barbara Bauer married in 1966. He became an American citizen in 1967.

== Early career ==
The Walker Art Center was the first to acquire Armajani's work, after he entered two works into their biennial in 1962. They purchased Prayer, an intricately lettered 70-inch (180 cm) canvas covered in Farsi poetry.

Always interested in computing and engineering, during the late 1960s he took classes at Control Data Institute in Minneapolis, where he learned Fortran. Armajani taught at the Minneapolis College of Art and Design from 1968 until 1979, where he met Barry Le Va, who introduced him to Conceptual art and then practiced in New York City. He participated in Art by Telephone at the Museum of Contemporary Art, Chicago in 1969. In 1970, Armajani contributed two works to the Museum of Modern Art exhibition Information: first, A Number Between Zero and One, a 9-foot (2.7 m) high column filled with computer printouts of individual decimal numbers; and second, North Dakota Tower, a proposed spire 18 miles (29 km) high and 2 miles (3.2 km) wide calculated to cast a narrow shadow over the entire length of North Dakota from east to west.

== Bridges ==
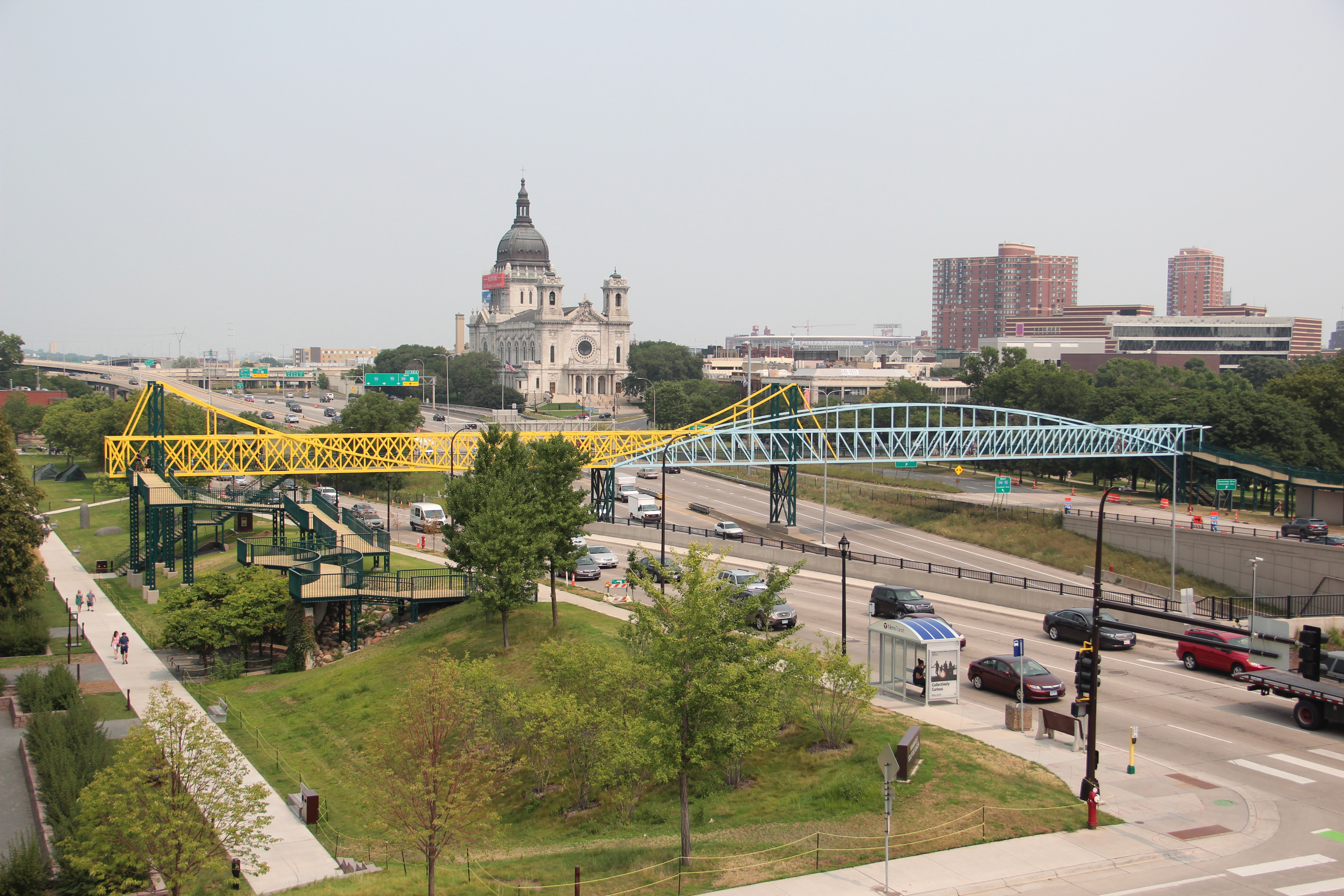
Irene Hixon Whitney Bridge in Minneapolis (1988). Armajani felt this was his finest work of public art.

In 1968, he built First Bridge in White Bear Lake, Minnesota as 10 feet (3.0 m) narrowing to 4 feet (1.2 m), illustrating our perspective vision. He built Fibonacci Discovery Bridge (1968–1988) to follow the mathematical Fibonacci sequence and, for the Walker's outdoor show 9 Artists/9 Spaces, he built Bridge Over Tree (1970), a 91-foot (28 m) long walkway with stairs that rise and fall over an evergreen tree.

In 1974–75, he built more than 1,000 cardboard and balsa wood models of components of American vernacular architecture titled Dictionary for Building.

In 1988, he designed the Irene Hixon Whitney Bridge in Minneapolis, uniting two neighborhoods previously separated by 16 lanes of streets and highway. Armajani expresses three basic types of bridge construction: beam (the walkway), arch (eastern side), and suspension (western side). He commissioned a poem by John Ashbery that is stamped into the bridge's upper beams. And in 1993, he built on one side in Loring Park, the pavilion Gazebo for Four Anarchists: Mary Nardini, Irma Sanchini, William James Sidis, Carlo Valdinoci.

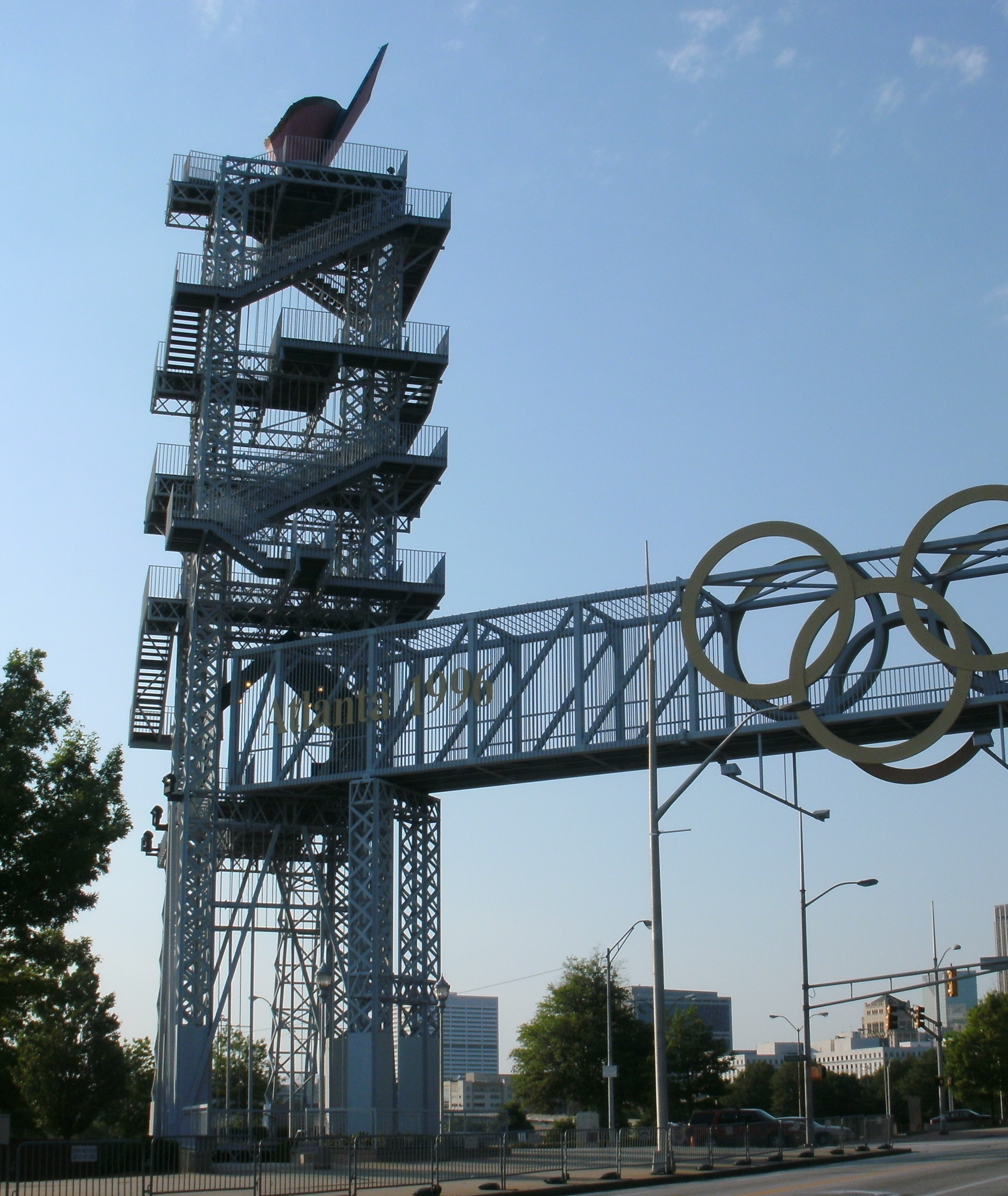
The 1996 Olympic cauldron in Atlanta, which Armajani later disowned

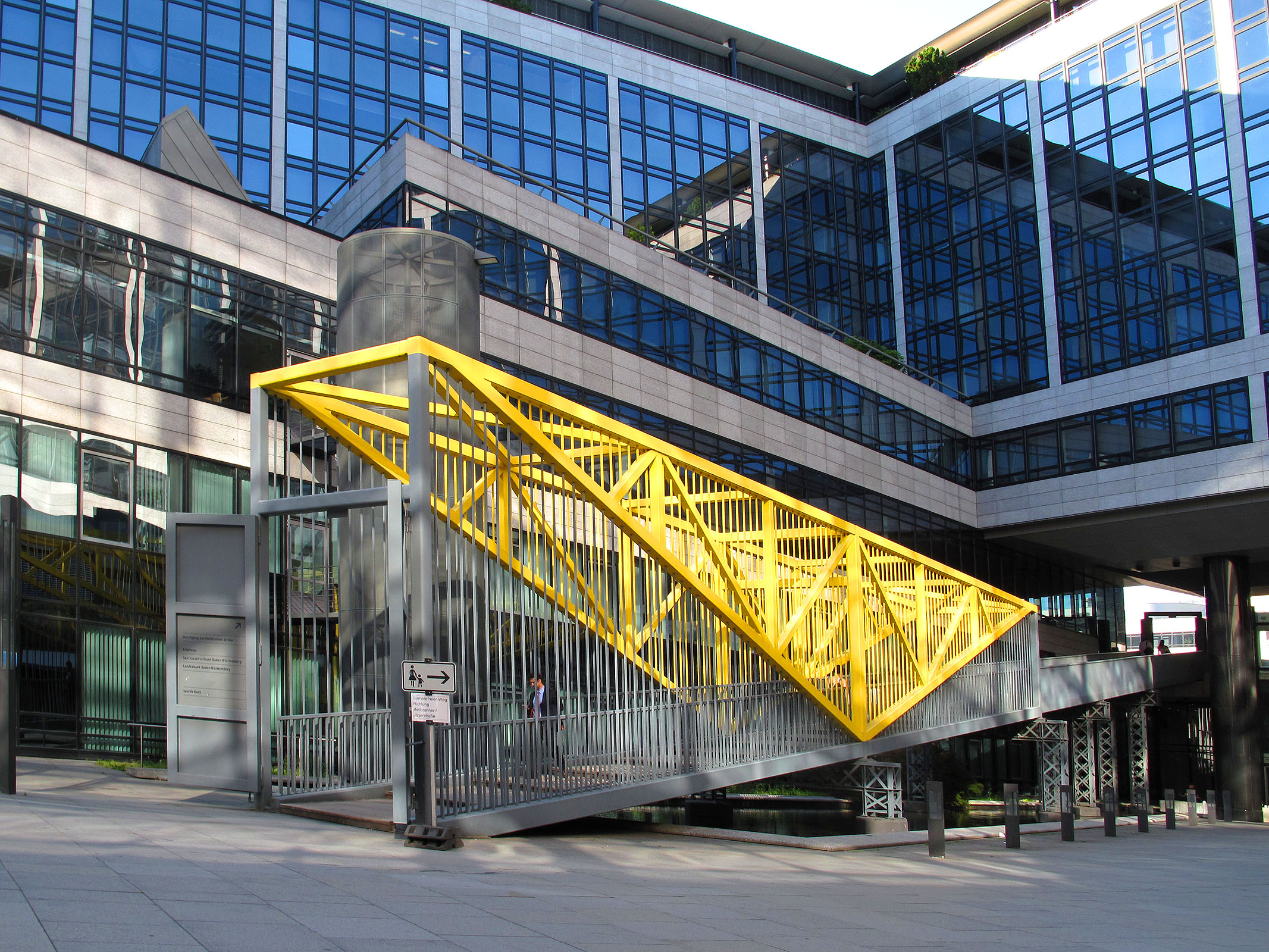
Siah Armajani, Bridge/Ramp, 1994, Stuttgart-Mitte, Innenhof der LBBW, beim Hauptbahnhof, Stuttgart

Siah Armajani designed the Olympic Torch presiding over the 1996 Summer Olympics in Atlanta, Georgia, United States, but later disowned the project because the Olympic Committee failed to uphold their contract. This was the first time the Olympic Torch was created by an artist; all previous designs had been created by engineers or architects.

He worked on other projects such as the Round Gazebo in Nice, France, the Sacco and Vanzetti Reading Room at the Museum für Moderne Kunst in Frankfurt, and projects in Münster, Germany; Battery Park City, New York; at Storm King Art Center in Mountainville, New York; and at the North Shore Esplanade at the St. George's Staten Island Ferry Terminal in Staten Island, New York.

== Later career ==
In his later years, Armajani returned to his politically active roots. His 2005 work, Fallujah, is a modern take on Picasso's Guernica but was censored in the U.S. due to its critical view of the war in Iraq. It was recently on view at the Walker Art Center in Minneapolis, Minnesota. Seven Rooms of Hospitality is based on a conversation between Jacques Derrida and Anne Dufourmantelle. Room for Deportees (2017) speaks out to the hard-line, anti-immigrant policies that took over in the US and Europe.

An exhibition at Muelensteen Gallery in 2011 presented a dozen of Armajani's early pieces made between 1957 and 1962, created in the years leading up to his arrival in America. Many employ ink or watercolor on cloth or paper, and incorporate text. In his Shirt (1958), Armajani uses pencil and ink to completely cover his father's shirt in Persian script.

The Minneapolis Institute of Art holds several works: Skyway No.2 (1980), a 5-foot (1.5 m) mahogany and brass portal; Mississippi Delta (2005-2006), a colored pencil on Mylar triptych picturing the aftermath of Hurricane Katrina; and An Exile Dreaming of Saint Adorno (2009), a cage-like inhabited tiny house or stage named for Theodor W. Adorno.

Armajani was the subject of more than 50 solo exhibitions, and his works featured in dozens of major exhibitions in the US and Europe. Siah Armajani: Follow This Line, the first comprehensive US retrospective dedicated to the artist, was on view at the Walker Art Center September 9 through December 30, 2018, and at the Met Breuer February 20 through June 2, 2019.

== Death ==
Armajani died of heart failure in Minneapolis on August 27, 2020, at age 81.

== Awards and honors ==
In 2010, he won a Knight Fellow award granted by United States Artists. In 2011, he was awarded Chevalier of the Ordre des Arts et des Lettres by the French government and received a distinguished artist award from the McKnight Foundation.

== See also ==
- Islamic art
- Iranian art
- Islamic calligraphy
- List of Iranian artists
- Modern and contemporary art in Iran
