= Ahmad Aali =

Iranian photographer and artist

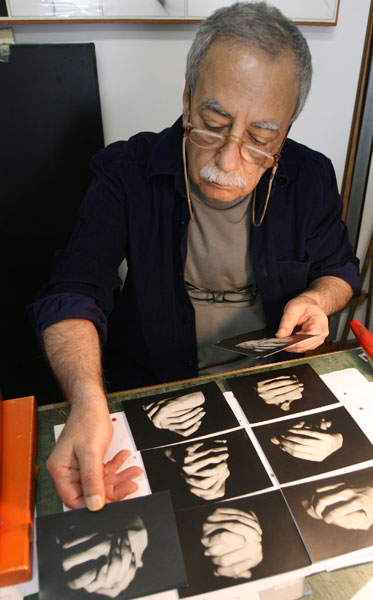
- Ahmad Aali, 2009
- Born: Ahmad Aali; 1935 (age 90–91); Tabriz, Iran
- Known for: photography
- Spouse: Mina Nouri

Ahmad Aali (b.1935; Persian: احمد عالی) is an Iranian photographer, painter and draftsman.

== Biography ==
Ahmad Aali was born in 1935 in Tabriz, Iran. In the 1960s, he attended the Kamal-ol-Molk art school in Iran. He is married to artist Mina Nouri.

Ahmad Aali came to Tehran in 1949 and first studied painting and drawing at the College of Visual Arts and later in the free classes of Kamal Al-Molk Conservatory. After his initial acquaintance with the camera, he gradually became fascinated with it and gradually began to learn technical issues in photography.

In the mid-1950s, he became acquainted with world-renowned photographers through foreign photo magazines and was influenced by new ideas. Aali held his first solo exhibition, including photographs with new perspectives and compositions, at the Culture Hall in 1963 and has since held several solo and group exhibitions.

Having a close relationship with Iranian modernist painters and sculptors, he took a formalistic and modernist look at his work, emphasizing that photography was not a mere copy of reality. One of the significant innovations in Iranian photography was the creation of mosaic combinations of photographs that did not correspond to classical photography methods. He exhibited this collection of his works for the first time in 1968 in Seyhoun Gallery.

Another part of his works includes documentary photographs, which simultaneously found a general and human face due to repetition and sequence. After the revolution, he spent more time on his painting experiences, which are generally hyper-realistic, and many of his works were done in the form of paintings on photographs. In 1997, many of his pictures were exhibited in the review exhibition of Ahmad Aali's works, and 2010, 2012, and 2016, he held solo exhibitions of his new and old works.

His work is in numerous public museum collections, such as the British Museum, the Los Angeles County Museum of Art (LACMA), among others.

== Solo exhibitions ==
This is a selected list of solo exhibitions by Aali, in order by date:

- 1963 - Farhang Hall (Talar-é Farhang), Tehran, Iran
- 1965 - Ghandriz Hall (Talar-é Ghandriz), Tehran, Iran
- 1968 - Borghese Gallery, Tehran, Iran
- 1968 - Seyhoun Gallery, Tehran, Iran
- 1970 - Club de France, Tehran, Iran
- 1997 - Barg Hallery, Ahmad Aali's Retrospective, Teheran, Iran
- 2008 - Aria Gallery, Urban Landscapes: Narrated by Ahmad Aali, Tehran, Iran
- 2010 – Ahmad Aali Selection of Works, 1961–2009, Mah-e Mehr Gallery, Tehran, Iran. This exhibition included 48 years of his photo work in a retrospective.
- 2012 – Aaran Gallery (Recycle), Tehran, Iran
- 2016 – Emkan Art Gallery (Ahmad Aali's Self-Portrait with G 11), Tehran, Iran
- 2018 – Azad Art Gallery (Recycled 2), Tehran, Iran

== Bibliography ==
=== As author ===
- Aali, Ahmad (2016). Ahmad Aali, Selection Of Paintings And Photographs 1953–2014. Nazar Publishers. ISBN 978-6001521911.
- Aali, Ahmad (2010). Ahmad Aali, Selection of Works, 1961–2009. Mah-e Mehr Gallery, Shahriyar Tavakoli (introduction), Touraj Hamidian (introduction), Ebrahim Haghighi (introduction). Nazar Research and Cultural Institute. ISBN 978-6005191943.

=== As subject ===
- A brief review on the creative photography of Iran 40's and 50's Faeghe Shokouh Nikoui (Anita) 2003, Azad University of art and Architecture
- History of the development of alternative Techniques of photography, Photomontage and photocollage Mehrnegar Fariborz 2001, Azad University Of Art And Architecture
- Life and works of Ahmad Aali by Farhad Ranjbaran, 1998, Azad University Of Art And Architecture

== See also ==
- Culture of Iran
- Islamic art
- Iranian art
- List of Iranian artists
