= Ardeshir Mohasses =

Iranian illustrator (1938–2008)

Ardeshir Mohassess
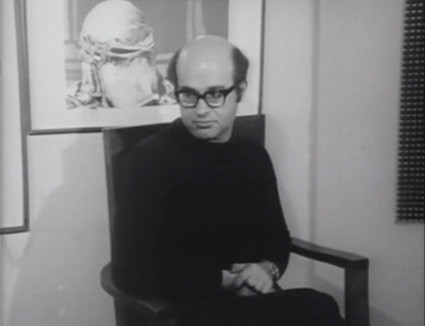
- Ardeshir Mohassess
- Born: 9 September 1938; Rasht, Imperial State of Iran
- Died: 9 October 2008 (aged 70); New York City, United States
- Education: University of Tehran (1962)
- Known for: Cartoonist, illustrator, satirist and painter
- Relatives: Bahman Mohasses (cousin)

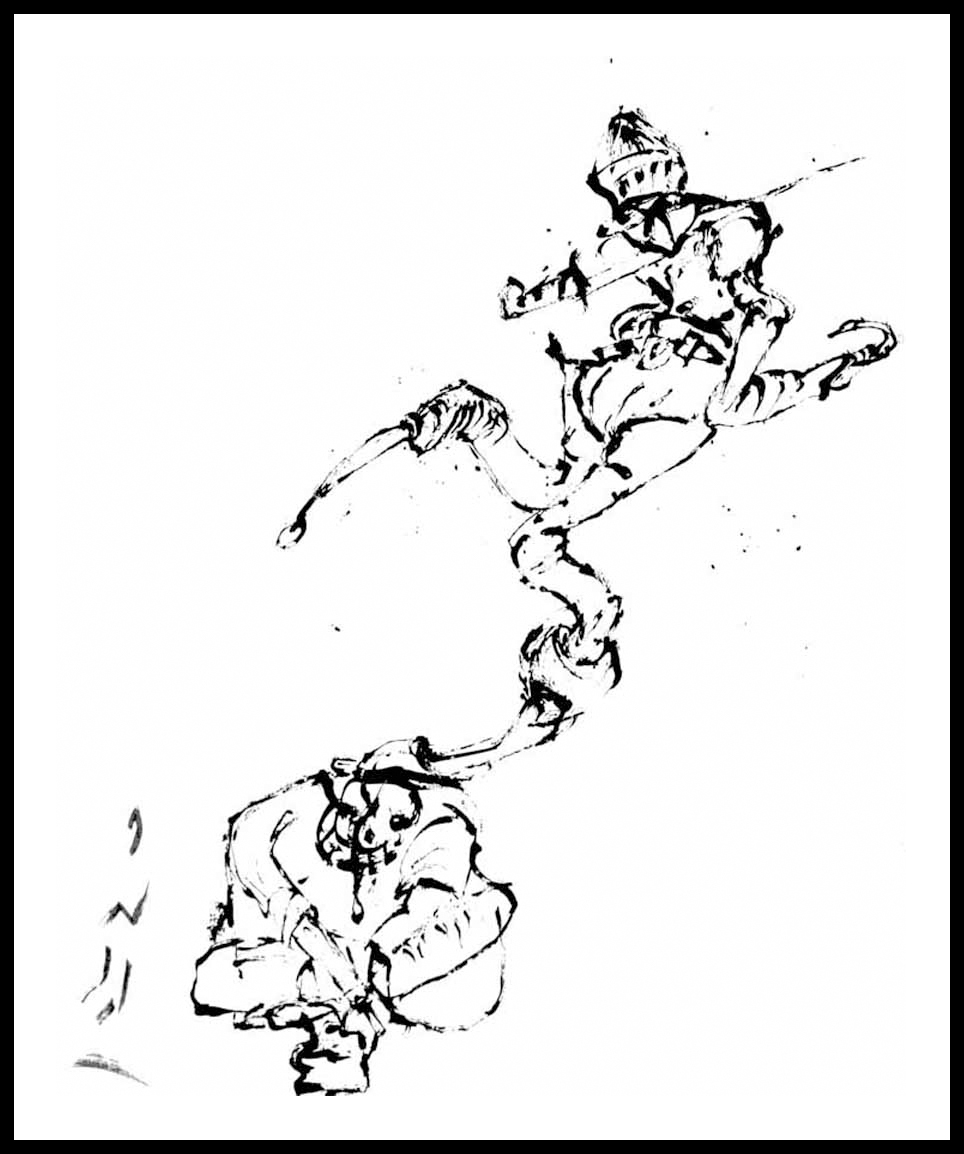
Illustration by Ardeshir Mohassess

Ardeshir Mohassess (also spelt Ardashir Mohasess, Persian: اردشير محصص, 9 September 1938 in Rasht – 9 October 2008 in New York) was an Iranian illustrator, satirist, cartoonist and painter, residing in New York.

== Biography ==
He was born in Rasht and was brought up in Lahijan. His parents were from well-to-do, professional families of Lahijan. His father, ʿAbbās-Qoli, was a judge and his mother, Sorur Mahkāma, was the principal of Rasht's first girls' school and a respected poet and literary figure in her own right. He began drawing at the age of 3, illustrating his mother's bedtime stories.

He graduated from Tehran University in 1962 with a degree in political science and law, but never studied art formally. While still a student, one of his classmates encouraged him to submit his work to Towfiq, a widely-read satirical journal. For the next eight years, he continued to produce works for the journal, and adopted the house style which involved pictorial commentaries on Iranian daily life and satiric editorials on political figures, which exaggerated the figure's facial features and body. He also worked as an illustrator and cartoonist for Kayhan and other local periodicals.

In 1967, he held his debut solo exhibitions at Qandriz Gallery Tehran, where he exhibited works that had virtually all been published in local journals over the preceding five-year period. The exhibition attracted a sizeable audience and earned him considerable praise.

In 1972, the weekly magazine, Jeune Afrique invited him to Paris and he began to produce satirical drawings and cartoons for this journal. Through this medium, he began to develop an international reputation as a visual satirist. Within a year, he was publishing illustrations in the New York Times.

By the mid-1970s, he had come under pressure from Shah Mohammed Reza Pahlavi and the SAVAK, who took exception to his political commentary and satire, and in 1977 he fled Iran, and went to New York. Although he hoped to return to Iran, the Iranian Revolution of 1979 and the rise of the Ayatollah Khomeini led to his settling permanently in New York.

After moving to New York, Mohassess increasingly organised his drawings with the flattened perspective and middle-ground compositions associated with Persian miniature painting, while retaining a loose and animated line. Literary, courtly and religious scenes became more common in his work. He also produced illustrations in connection with several major Iranian writers, including Ahmad Shamlou and Sadegh Hedayat.

In 2006, New York Museum of Modern Art held an exhibition presenting some of his work.

In 2008, to "increase awareness of the complexity of modern history and life in Iran," the Asia Society in New York organized another exhibition of Mohassess' satirical cartoons and illustrations.

In his later life, he suffered from Parkinson's disease and failing eyesight, yet continued to work. He died in New York and is buried in Green-Wood Cemetery in Brooklyn, New York.

== Selected bibliography ==
- Cactus, a special issue of Daftarha-ye Zamaneh, with an introduction by Karim Emami, including drawings from 1961 to 1966, Tehran 1971.
- With Ardeshir Mohassess and his Puppets, with an introduction by Ali Asghar Haj-Seyed-Javadi, including drawings from 1967 to 1971, Tous Publications, Tehran, 1971.
- Current Events, with an introduction by Ahmad Shamlou, a selection of drawings from 1971, Amir Kabir Publications, Tehran, 1973.
- Momenten, a selection of drawings from 1968 to 1972, edited by K. Farrokhi, Sun Publications, Haarlem, the Netherlands, 1973.
- Identity Card, a selection of drawings done in 1972, Tahouri Publications, Tehran, 1973.
- Ceremonies, an Introduction by Aydin Aghdashloo, a selection of drawings from 1972, Fine Arts Publications (under the auspices of Gallery Ayeh), Tehran, 1973.
- Jahan-e No, a special issue of drawings, including drawings done in 1972, Tehran, 1973.
- Ardeshir and Stormy Winds, with an introduction by Ali Asghar Haj-Seyed-Javadi, including drawings from 1967 to 1973, Tous Publications, Tehran, 1973.
- Ardeshir Mohassess: Art and Satire in Iran, Asia Society, 2008

== Personal life ==
Mohasses was a cousin of Bahman Mohasses, dubbed by some as the "Persian Picasso", Iranian painter, sculptor, translator, and theatre director.
