= List of Iranian artists =

The following list of notable Iranian artists (in alphabetical order by last name) includes artists of various genres, who are notable and are either born in Iran, of Iranian descent or who produce works that are primarily about Iran.

== Cinema artists ==
=== Actors and actresses ===
- Akbar Abdi (born 1960)
- Golab Adineh (born 1953)
- Mahnaz Afshar (born 1977)
- Shohreh Aghdashloo (born 1952)
- Pegah Ahangarani (born 1984)
- Taraneh Alidousti (born 1984)
- Jahangir Almasi (born 1955)
- Fariborz Arabnia (born 1964)
- Reza Arham Sadr (1923–2008)
- Daryoush Arjmand (born 1944)
- Bijan Daneshmand (born 1958)
- Delkash (1924–2004)
- Omid Djalili (born 1965)
- Bizhan Emkanian (born 1953)
- Ezzatollah Entezami (1924–2018)
- Homayoun Ershadi (born 1947)
- Parviz Fannizadeh (1938–1980)
- Behzad Farahani (born 1945)
- Golshifteh Farahani (born 1983)
- Shaghayegh Farahani (born 1972)
- Mohammad Ali Fardin (1930–2000)
- Farimah Farjami (born 1950)
- Bita Farrahi (born 1958)
- Hamid Farrokhnezhad (born 1969)
- Jahangir Forouhar (1916–1997)
- Leila Forouhar (born 1959)
- Mohammad Reza Foroutan (born 1968)
- Faramarz Gharibian (born 1941)
- Googoosh (born 1949)
- Mohammad Reza Golzar (born 1977)
- Azita Hajian (born 1958)
- Kazem HajirAzad (born 1950)
- Leila Hatami (born 1972)
- Amin Hayaee (born 1970)
- Niki Karimi (born 1971)
- Kamshad Kooshan (born 1962)
- Mohammad Ali Keshavarz (1930–2020)
- Reza Kianian (born 1951)
- Neelam Kothari (born 1969)
- Majid Majidi (born 1959)
- Marshall Manesh (born 1950)
- Jamshid Mashayekhi (1934–2019)
- Mahvash (1920–1961)
- Mehran Modiri (born 1967)
- Bahman Mofid (1942–2020)
- Ali Mosaffa (born 1966)
- Fatemeh Motamed-Aria (born 1961)
- Ali Nassirian (born 1935)
- Roya Nonahali (born 1964)
- Roxanne Pallett (born 1982)
- Parviz Parastouee (born 1955)
- Mahaia Petrosian (born 1970)
- Parsa Pirouzfar (born 1972)
- Saeed Rad (born 1944)
- Bahram Radan (born 1979)
- Davoud Rashidi (1933–2016)
- Ahmad Mehranfar (born 1975)
- Navid Mohammadzadeh (born 1988)
- Shiva Rose (born 1969), Iranian-American actress located in Los Angeles
- Homa Rousta (1946–2015)
- Parviz Sayyad (born 1939)
- Khosrow Shakibaee (1944–2008)
- Mohammad Reza Sharifinia (born 1955)
- Jamileh Sheykhi (1930–2001)
- Daryush Shokof (1954)
- Sussan Taslimi (born 1950)
- Hedyeh Tehrani (born 1971)
- Shiva Boloorian (born 1979)
- Behrouz Vossoughi (born 1938)
- Merila Zarei (born 1971)
- Bahareh Rahnama (born 1971)
- Parinaz Izadyar (born 1985)
- Jewell Farshad (born 1996)
- Yara Shahidi (born 2000)

=== Directors and filmmakers ===
- Fariborz Arabnia (born 1964)
- Morteza Avini (1947–1993)
- Rakhshan Bani-Etemad (born 1954)
- Bahram Beyzai (1938–2025)
- Shahram Entekhabi (born 1963)
- Mitra Farahani (born 1975)
- Ramin Farahani (born 1969)
- Bahman Farman-Ara (born 1942)
- Iraj Ghaderi (1935–2012)
- Behrooz Gharibpoor (born 1950)
- Bahman Ghobadi (born 1969)
- Ali Hatami (1944–1996)
- Ebrahim Hatamikia (born 1961)
- Mahboubeh Honarian (born 1962)
- Ardeshir Irani (1886–1969)
- Abolfazl Jalili (born 1957)
- Varuzh Karim-Masihi (born 1953)
- Samuel Khachikian (1923–2001)
- Abbas Kiarostami (1940–2016)
- Masoud Kimiai (born 1941)
- Parviz Kimiavi (born 1939)
- Kamshad Kooshan (born 1962)
- Esma'il Kooshan (1917–1981)
- Mohsen Makhmalbaf (born 1957)
- Samira Makhmalbaf (born 1980)
- Majid Majidi (born 1959)
- Darius Mehrjui (born 1939)
- Mehran Modiri (born 1967)
- Rasoul Mollagholipour (1955–2007)
- Amir Naderi (born 1946)
- Hossein Nuri (born 1954)
- Jafar Panahi (born 1960)
- Babak Payami (born 1966)
- Hossein Rajabian (born 1984)
- Ali Samadi Ahadi (born 1972)
- Amir Shahab Razavian (born 1965)
- Abdolhossein Sepanta (1907–1969)
- Sohrab Shahid-Sales (1944–1998)
- Kamran Shirdel (born 1939)
- Daryush Shokof (1954)
- Khosrow Sinai (1941–2020)
- Kamal Tabrizi (born 1959)
- Nasser Taghvai (born 1941)

=== Film score composers ===
- Hossein Alizadeh (born 1951)
- Fariborz Lachini (born 1949)
- Mehdi Rajabian (born 1989)
- Ahmad Pejman (born 1935)
- Peyman Yazdanian (born 1968)

== Designers ==
=== Architects ===
- Hooshang Seyhoun
- Hossein Amanat
- Bahram Shirdel
- Hadi Mirmiran
- Siavash Teimouri

=== Calligraphers ===
- Ali Adjalli (born 1939)
- Gholam Hossein Amirkhani (born 1939)
- Abolhassan Etessami (1903–1978)
- Fakhr Jahan Khanum (1798 – 1858)
- Mir Emad Hassani (1553-1615)
- Seyyed Jafar Kashfi (born 2000)
- Yadollah Kaboli Khansari (born 1949)
- Mishkín-Qalam (1826–1912)
- Jalil Rasouli (born 1947)
- Mehdi Saeedi (born 1979)
- Mir Ali Tabrizi (1329-1451)
- Towhidi Tabari (born 1964)

=== Fashion designers ===
- Ray Aghayan (1928–2011) fashion designer and costume designer, Emmy Award winner.
- Mike Amiri, fashion designer
- Pegah Anvarian, Iranian-born American fashion designer, stylist, creative director, and interior designer
- Shirin Guild (born 1946) fashion designer in London
- Mehr Monir Jahanbani (1926–2018), textile designer and fashion designer
- Arefeh Mansouri (born 1980)
- Hushidar Mortezaie (born 1972), fashion designer of club wear and streetwear, active in New York City and Los Angeles
- Behnaz Sarafpour (born 1969), fashion designer of womenswear and fragrances; based in New York
- Bijan (designer) (1940–2012), fashion designer of menswear and fragrances
- Mahla Zamani (born 1900)

=== Graphic designers ===
- Sadegh Barirani (1923–2025)
- Dariush Borbor (born 1934)
- Reza Abedini (born 1967)
- Farshid Mesghali (born 1943)
- Ali Asghar Mohtaj (born 1943)
- Morteza Momayez (1935–2005)
- Mehdi Saeedi (born 1979)
- Ghobad Shiva (born 1940)
- Reza Abbasi (1564-1635)

=== Illustrators ===
- Nahid Hagigat (born 1943), illustrator, and painter
- Mojtaba Heidarpanah (born 1990) is an Iranian cartoonist, illustrator, painter, character designer and animator
- Rashin Kheiriyeh (born 1979), illustrator, children's book author, digital artist, and animator

== Musicians and singers ==
=== Classical ===
See List of Iranian composers

==== Iranian classical/traditional ====
- Alireza Eftekhari
- Hossein Alizadeh
- Axiom of Choice
- Gholam-Hossein Banan
- Sima Bina, folkloric music
- Delkash
- Mirza Abdollah Farahani
- Morteza Hannaneh
- Kayhan Kalhor
- Kamkarha
- Ruhollah Khaleghi
- Fariborz Lachini
- Mehdi Rajabian
- Mohammad Reza Lotfi
- Javad Maroofi
- Marzieh
- Shahram Nazeri
- Parisa
- Abolhasan Saba
- Mohammad Shams
- Homayoun Shajarian
- Mohammad-Reza Shajarian
- Nematollah Aghasi
- Alinaghi Vaziri
- Jalal Zolfonun
- Mahmoud Zoufonoun
- Zyriab

==== Western classical ====
- Aminollah Hossein
- Mehdi Hosseini
- Idin Samimi Mofakham
- Lotfi Mansouri
- Nader Mashayekhi
- Ali Rahbari
- Anoushiravan Rohani
- Shahrdad Rohani
- Heshmat Sandjari
- Loris Tjeknavorian (Loris Cheknavarian)

=== Electronic ===
- Leila Arab
- Deep Dish
  - Ali "Dubfire" Shirazinia (of Deep Dish)
  - Shahram Tayebi (of Deep Dish)
- Ali Movasat (DJ Aligator)
- Steve Naghavi (of German industrial group And One)
- Rezz (Isabelle Rezazadeh, who has Iranian father)

=== Pop ===
- Afshin
- Arash
- Arian Band
- Aref
- Alireza Assar
- Alreza Eftekhari
- Alireza Talischi
- Andy Madadian
- Anousheh Khalili
- Babak Jahanbakhsh
- Bahador Kharazmi
- Benyamin Bahadori
- Bijan Mortazavi
- Cameron Cartio
- Darius Danesh
- Dariush Eghbali
- Delkash
- Ebi (Ebrahim Hamedi)
- Faramarz Aslani
- Farhad (Farhad Mehrad)
- Siavash Ghomayshi
- Googoosh
- Habib
- Hayadeh
- Hassan Shamaizadeh
- Hodi
- Kouros
- Leila Forouhar
- Mahasti
- Mahvash
- Mansour
- Mehrdad
- Mohammad Nouri
- Moein
- Morteza Pashaei
- Nooshafarin
- Omid
- Pyruz
- Reza Sadeghi
- Hassan Sattar
- Sepideh
- Susan Roshan
- Shahkar Binesh Pazhooh
- Saeed
- Shahram Shabpareh
- Shahrum K
- Toofan
- Vigen

==== Lyricists ====
- Shahriar Ghanbary
- Maryam Heydarzadeh
- Leila Kasra
- Rahim Moeini Kermanshahi

=== Rock/metal ===
- 127
- Amir Derakh
- Angband
- Barad
- Kiosk
- Kaveh Afagh

== Performing artists ==
=== Comedians ===
- Omid Djalili (born 1965)
- Negin Farsad
- Maz Jobrani (born 1972)
- Hadi Khorsandi (born 1943)
- Shaparak Khorsandi (born 1973)
- Ebrahim Nabavi (born 1958)

=== Dancers ===
- Farzaneh Kaboli
- Jamileh (born 1946)
- Shahrokh Moshkin Ghalam (born 1967)

=== Theatre directors ===
- Bijan Mofid (1935-1984)
- Hengameh Mofid (born 1955)
- Akbar Alizad (born 1973)
- Bahram Bayzai (born 1938)
- Niloofar Beyzaie (born 1967)
- Shiva Boloorian (born 1979)
- Hossein Nuri (born 1954)
- Hossein Rajabian (born 1984)
- Reza Shirmarz (born 1974)

=== Theatre stage actors ===
- Bahman Mofid (1942-2020)
- Shohreh Aghdashloo (born 1952)
- Dariush Arjmand (born 1944)
- Mehdi Bajestani (born 1974)
- Shiva Boloorian (born 1979)
- Ali Etesamifar (born 1990)
- Behzad Farahani (born 1945)
- Mohammad Reza Jozi (born 1975)
- Ali Nassirian (born 1935)
- Ahmad Saatchian (born 1972)
- Roya Teymourian (born 1959)

== Visual artists ==
=== Photography ===
- Ahmad Aali (born 1935)
- Abbas (1944–2018)
- Morteza Avini (1947–1993)
- Gohar Dashti (born 1980)
- Nader Davoodi (born 1963)
- Reza Deghati (born 1952)
- Shahram Entekhabi (born 1963)
- Mehdi Vosoughnia (born 1971)
- Peyman Hooshmandzadeh (born 1969)
- Kaveh Golestan (1950–2003)
- Shadi Ghadirian (born 1974)
- Nasrollah Kasraian (born 1944)
- Sanaz Mazinani (born 1978)
- Ahmad Nateghi (born 1958)
- Malekeh Nayiny (born 1955)
- Hossein Rajabian (born 1984)
- Jahangir Razmi (born 1947)
- Rahi Rezvani (born 1978)
- Sadegh Tirafkan (1965–2013)
- Ali Khan Vali (1845–1902)
- Alfred Yaghobzadeh (born 1958)
- Maryam Zandi (born 1947)

=== Cartoonists ===
- Javad Alizadeh (born 1953)
- Ardeshir Mohassess (1938–2008)
- Ali Divandari (born 1957)
- Nikahang Kowsar (born 1969)
- Alireza Karimi Moghaddam (born 1975)
- Mojtaba Heidarpanah (born 1990)
- Mana Neyestani (born 1973)
- Touka Neyestani (born 1960)

=== Multimedia and mixed media ===
- Golnar Adili (born 1976) printmaking, sculpture
- Morehshin Allahyari (born 1985) (active since 2007), artist, activist
- Shirin Aliabadi (1973–2018), multidisciplinary visual artist, active in Tehran and Paris.
- Shahin Charmi (born 1953), Iranian-born German multidisciplinary artist and muralist.
- Monir Shahroudy Farmanfarmaian (1924–2019) best known for her mirror mosaics, sculptor, painter, textile designer.
- Ghazel (1966), visual and performance artist
- Gita Hashemi (born 1961) (active since 1981), performance art, installations, digital and multimedia art
- Avish Khebrehzadeh (born 1969), painting, drawing, video art, installation art and photography
- Bahman Mohasses (1931–2010), painter, sculptor, translator, and theatre director
- Neda Moridpour (born 1983), artist, educator and co-founder of the artist-activist collaborative Louder than Words
- Shirin Neshat (born 1957), film, video and photography
- Hossein Nuri (born 1954), painter, dramaturge and filmmaker
- Ramin, Rokni, Hesam (born 1975,1978,1980)
- Mohammad Salemy (born 1967)
- Soheila Sokhanvari (born 1964), painter, sculptor, and multi-media artist
- Sheida Soleimani, (born 1990), Iranian-American, 'constructed' tableau photography.
- Daryush Shokof (born 1954), artist, sculptor, script writer, film producer, video, filmmaker, singer, lyricist
- Parviz Tanavoli (born 1937), sculptor, painter, scholar and art collector
- Sadegh Tirafkan (1965–2013), photography, video installation, and collage
- Hossein Valamanesh (born 1949), Iranian-Australian public art and multimedia.
- Hossein Zenderoudi (born 1937), painter and sculptor
- Afshin Naghouni (born 1969), painter, mixed media.
- Saman and Sasan Oskouei (born 1985 & 1991), multidisciplinary artist-

activists

- Amir Sheikhvand (born 1979), jewelry artist

=== Painters ===
- Reza Abbasi (c. 1565-1635)
- Shahla Aghapour (born 1976)
- Aydin Aghdashloo (born 1940)
- Anahita Akhavan
- Kamrooz Aram (born 1978)
- Akbar Behkalam (1944–2025)
- Hossein Behzad (1894–1968), Modernist Persian miniature paintings
- Kamaleddin Behzad (1450–1535), Persian miniature paintings
- Dariush Borbor (born 1934)
- Bijan Daneshmand (born 1958)
- Iran Darroudi (1936–2021), surrealist paintings
- Ali Divandari (born 1957)
- Ala Ebtekar (born 1978) American-born Iranian painter and professor
- Ahmad Esfandiari (1922–2012) modernist painter
- Darvish Fakhr (born 1969)
- Mahmoud Farshchian (1930–2025), Persian
- Golnaz Fathi (born 1972)
- Pariyoush Ganji (born 1945), painter based in Tehran
- Mokarrameh Ghanbari (1928–2005)
- Rokni Haerizadeh (born 1978)
- Raoof Haghighi (born 1976)
- Fariba Hajamadi (born 1957)
- Maryam Hashemi (born 1977)
- Khosrow Hassanzadeh (born 1963)
- Haydar Hatemi (born 1945), Persian miniatures and tazhib
- Taraneh Hemami (born 1960), visual artist based in the San Francisco Bay Area
- Pouran Jinchi (born 1959), abstract, calligraphy-based contemporary visual art
- Bahram Kalhornia (born 1952)
- Zhaleh Kazemi (1944–2003), painter
- Reza Khodadadi (born 1961)
- Iman Maleki (born 1976), realist painter
- Mani (AD 216 - AD 277)
- Leyly Matine-Daftary (1937–2007), modernist artist, educator
- Sirak Melkonian (1930–2024), modernist painter
- Farhad Moshiri (born 1963), pop art
- Noreen Motamed (born 1967)
- Hossein Nuri (born 1954)
- Kamal ol-Molk (1845–1940)
- Nasser Ovissi (born 1934) Iranian-born American painter
- Pantea Rahmani (born 1971)
- Tarlan Rafiee (born 1980)
- Raha Raissnia (born 1968)
- Ramin, Rokni, Hesam (born 1975,1978,1980)
- Gholamhossein Saber (born 1941)
- Ali Akbar Sadeghi (born 1937), surrealist
- Abolhassan Khan Sadighi (1894–1995)
- Homayoun Salimi (born 1948)
- Yashar Samimi Mofakham (born 1979)
- Sohrab Sepehri (1928–1980), Modernist painter
- Alireza Shojaian (born 1988), queer artist and LGBT activist
- Daryush Shokof (1954)
- Keyvan Shovir (born 1985), Iranian American graffiti artist
- Sadegh Tabrizi (1938–2017), Iranian modern painter, calligrapher
- Mohammad Ali Taraghijah (1943–2010)
- Taravat Talepasand (born 1979), Iranian American painter and sculptor
- Mohsen Vaziri-Moghaddam (1924–2018)
- Manoucher Yektai (1922–2019)

=== Sculpture and installation ===
- Kamran Afshar Naderi (born 1959)
- Siah Armajani (1939–2020)
- Dariush Borbor (born 1934), architect, urban planner, sculptor, painter, researcher, writer
- Fatemeh Emdadian (born 1955)
- Shahram Entekhabi (born 1963), contemporary sculptor
- Monir Shahroudy Farmanfarmaian (1924–2019)
- Bita Fayyazi (born 1962), public art
- Bita Ghezelayagh (born 1966)
- Ahad Hosseini (born 1944), Iranian Azerbaijani sculptor and painter
- Mandana Moghaddam (born 1962), Iranian-Swedish installation artist and sculptor
- Bahman Mohasses (1931–2010), painter, sculptor, translator, and theatre director
- Parviz Tanavoli (born 1937)
- Abolhassan Khan Sadighi (1894–1995)
- Ramin, Rokni, Hesam (born 1975,1978,1980)
- Shirana Shahbazi (born 1974)
- Taher Shekh Al Hokamaii (born 1954), Dean of Sculpture Faculty of Tehran University and contemporary sculptor
- Daryush Shokof (1954)

== See also ==
- Hurufiyya movement - label given to calligraphy-based visual artists
- List of Iranian Americans
- List of Iranian painters
- List of Iranian women artists
- List of Iranian writers
- Iranian modern and contemporary art
