= List of burials at Shah Abdol-Azim Shrine =

This is a list of people buried at Shah Abdol-Azim Shrine.

The Shi'ite shrine is the burial site for many notable individuals, including members of the Qajar family, and many notable political figures, scholars, and clerics, from the Medieval period to contemporary times.

Name	Lifespan (CE)		Occupation
Name	Born	Died	Occupation
Abdolazim Hassani	789	866	medieval scholar
Mortezā Rāzi (fa)	11th century		medieval scholar
Abolfotuh Rāzi	1087	1157	medieval scholar
Ahmad Monshi Qomi	1547	1607	author
Abolghāsem Ghāem-Maghām Farāhāni	1779	1835	prime minister (1834–35)
Mohammad-Sharif Khān Māfi (fa)		1847	politician
Qā'āni Shirāzi	1808	1854	poet
Jeyrān Forough os-Saltaneh	1835	1860	wife of Nasereddin Shah
Sa'ādat-Ali Shāh (fa)		1876	leader of Nematullahi Gonabadi Sufi order
Abbās-Ali Dādāshbeig (fa)	1814	1878	military officer and father of Reza Shah
Aliqoli Mirzā E'tezād os-Saltaneh	1822	1880	Qajar prince
Mirza Mohammad Khan Sinaki Lavasani	1809	1881	politician
Bahrām Mirzā Moezz od-Dowleh	1806	1882	Qajar prince and politician
Ali Kani	1805	1888	cleric
Ali Zonouzi (fa)	1819	1890	cleric
Nāsereddin Shāh Qājār	1831	1896	Shahanshah of Iran (1848–96)
Mohammad-Ali Sadr ol-Mamālek (fa)		1902	politician
Vajihollāh Mirzā (az)	1854	1905	Qajar prince and politician
Fātemeh Khānom Esmat od-Dowleh	1855	1905	Qajar princess
Ali-Rezā Khān Azed ol-Molk	1847	1910	regent of Iran (1909–10)
Doust-Mohammad Khān Moayyer ol-Mamālek (fa)	1856	1912	politician
Sattār Khān	1866	1914	leader of Persian Constitutional Revolution
Soltān-Hossein Mirzā Jalāl od-Dowleh	1868	1914	Qajar prince and politician
Adib ol-Mamālek Farāhāni	1860	1917	poet
Nour-Ali Shāh II (fa)	1867	1918	leader of Nematullahi Gonabadi Sufi order
Abolhassan Mirzā (az)	1847	1919	Qajar prince and politician
Mohammad Tabātabāei	1842	1920	cleric
Malek-Mansour Mirzā Sho'ā os-Saltaneh	1880	1920	Qajar prince
Mohammad Khiābāni	1880	1920	politician
Ahmad Vaziri (fa)	1869	1921	politician
Abolqāssem Khān Nāser ol-Molk	1866	1927	politician and regent of Iran (1911–14)
Abolhassan Tabātabāei Boroujerdi (fa)		1930	politician
Ahmad Bader Nasir od-Dowleh (fa)	1870	1930	politician
Raf'at Semnāni (fa)	1882	1931	poet
Mohammad-Hossein Nadoushani (fa)	1864	1932	politician
Ali-Mardān Khān Bakhtiāari (fa)	1892	1934	chief of Bakhtiari tribe
Bānoo-Ozma Eftekhār od-Dowleh (fa)	1857	1935	Qajar princess
Nezāmeddin Hekmat Moshār od-Dowleh (fa)	1883	1936	politician
Abdollāh Hāeri Rahmat-Ali Shāh (fa)	1862	1937	Sufi leader
Mohammad Aghāzādeh Khorāsani	1877	1937	cleric
Firouz Mirzā Nostrat od-Dowleh	1889	1938	Qajar prince and politician
Abdol-Hossein Mirzā Farmānfarmā	1852	1939	Qajar prince and politician
Rezā Shāh Pahlavi	1878	1944	chief of Persian Cossack Brigade (1920–21), prime minister (1923–24) and Shahanshah of Iran (1925–41) (see Reza Shah's mausoleum)
Gholamhossein Rahnamā (fa)	1882	1946	scholar
Mohammad-Amin Emāmi Khoei	1887	1948	scholar
Mohammad Qazvini	1877	1949	scholar
Esmāil Mer'āt	1893	1949	politician
Abdolhossein Hazhir	1902	1949	prime minister (1948)
Abdollāh Mostowfi (fa)	1878	1950	politician
Mostafā Adl	1882	1950	politician
Ali Razmārā	1901	1951	military officer and prime minister (1950–51)
Hossein-Ali Mirzā E'tezād os-Saltaneh (ru)	1891	1953	Qajar prince
Mohammad Mazāher (fa)	1875	1954	politician
Ali-Rezā Pahlavi	1922	1954	Pahlavi prince
Ahmad Qavām Qavām os-Saltaneh	1873	1955	prime minister (1921–22, 22-23, 42-43, 46-47, 52)
Abbās Eqbāl Āshtiāni	1896	1956	scholar
Ali Soheili	1896	1958	prime minister (1942, 1943–44)
Mohammad-Sādegh Tabātabāei	1881	1961	politician
Abolghāsem Kāshāni	1882	1962	cleric
Fazlollāh Zāhedi	1892	1963	military officer and prime minister (1953–55)
Tayeb Haj-Rezāei	1911	1963	traditional athlete
Abdolazim Gharib (ru)	1879	1965	scholar
Nezam-Vafā Ārāni (fa)	1887	1965	poet
Hassan-Ali Mansur	1923	1965	prime minister (1964–65)
Ziāeddin Tabātabāei	1889	1969	journalist and prime minister (1921)
Mohammad Farzān (fa)	1894	1970	scholar
Badiozzamān Forouzānfar	1897	1970	scholar
Ahmad Matin-Daftari	1897	1971	prime minister (1939–40)
Mohammad-Ali Emām-Shushtari	1902	1972	scholar
Dāvoud Maghāmi (fa)	1938	1972	politician
Abolhassan Sha'rāni	1902	1973	cleric
Mohammad-Kāzem Assār	1884	1975	scholar
Ahmad Āshtiāni	1882	1975	cleric
Mohammad-Amir Khātami	1920	1975	commander in chief of IIAF (1958–75)
Mohammad-Rezā Khātami Boroujerdi (fa)	1923	1978	cleric
Jalāleddin Mohaddes Ormavi (fa)	1904	1979	scholar
Ali-Asghar Hekmat	1892	1980	politician
Soleimān Behboudi (fa)	1896	1981	politician
Nasrollāh Falsafi (fa)	1901	1981	scholar
Rezā Māfi	1943	1982	calligrapher
Hassan Nayyerzādeh (fa)	1928	1983	cleric
Karim Amiri Firuzkouhi	1910	1984	painter
Mohammad-Ali Hedāyati (fa)	1910	1986	politician
Amanollāh Ardalān Ezz-ol-Mamālek (fa)	1884	1987	politician
Mehdi Soheili (fa)	1924	1987	poet
Hossein Lankarāni	1889	1989	politician
Shamseddin Jazāyeri (fa)	1913	1990	politician
Hossein Khorāsāni (fa)	1921	1993	cleric
Mohammad-Taghi Falsafi	1908	1998	cleric
Rezā Zavāre'i	1938	2005	politician
Abdolkarim Haghshenās	1919	2007	cleric
Mortezā Jazāyeri (fa)	1930	2008	cleric
Abolghāsem Gorji (fa)	1923	2010	scholar
Mohammad-Ali Taraghijāh	1943	2010	painter
Mohiyoddin Anvāri (fa)	1926	2012	cleric
Mostafā Ahmadi Roshan	1979	2012	scholar
Azizollāh Khoshvaght	1926	2013	cleric
Mojtabā Tehrāni	1937	2013	cleric
Sādegh Tirafkan	1965	2013	artist
Vali Akbar (fa)	1970	2013	wrestler
Ali Ghayouri (fa)	1930	2014	cleric
Mohammad-Rezā Mahdavi Kani	1931	2014	cleric and prime minister (1981)
Parviz Moayyed-Ahd (fa)	1929	2016	scholar
Mohammad-Taghi Nourbakhsh (fa)	1962	2018	scholar
Fātemeh Arabshāhi (fa)	1923	2020	poet
Mohammad-Ali Shahidi	1949	2020	cleric
Ali-Akbar Mohtashamipur	1947	2021	cleric
Mohammad Ziāābādi	1928	2021	cleric
Ali-Rezā Tābesh (fa)	1953	2021	politician
Abbās-Ali Akhtari	1939	2022	cleric
Mohammad Reyshahri	1946	2022	cleric
Hossein Amir-Abdollāhiān	1964	2024	minister of foreign affairs
Ashraf Boroujerdi (fa)	1955	2025	politician
Hossein Salāmi	1960	2025	member of IRGC
Mohammad-Mehdi Tehrānchi	1965	2025	scholar

== See also ==
- List of mausoleums in Iran
- Shia Islam in Iran
- Holiest sites in Islam (Shia)
