= 127 =

127 may refer to:

- 127 (number), the natural number following 126 and preceding 128
- AD 127, a year in the 2nd century AD
- 127 BC, a year in the 2nd century BC
- 127 (band), an Iranian band
- NCT 127, a sub-unit of the South Korean boy band NCT
- 127 Johanna, a main-belt asteroid
- 127 film, a film format
- Fiat 127, a supermini car
  - SEAT 127, a supermini car based on the Fiat 127
- 127 Hours, a 2010 film

== See also ==
- 127th (disambiguation)
- List of highways numbered 127
- 12/7 (disambiguation)
