= Taher Shekh Al Hokamaii =

Iranian contemporary sculptor (born 1954)

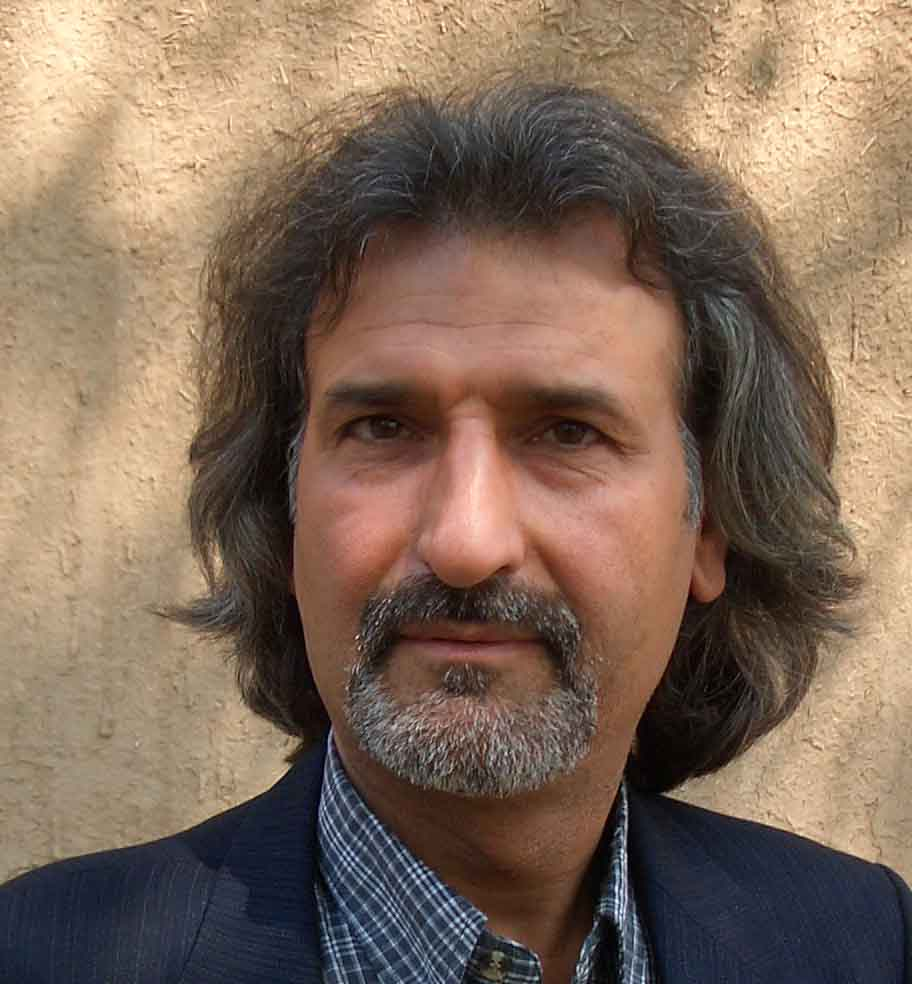
- Born: 1954 (age 71–72); Kazerun County, Fars province, Iran
- Education: Tehran University College of Fine Arts
- Known for: Sculptor

Taher Shekh Al Hokamaii (Persian: طاهر شیخ الحکمایی, born 1954) is an Iranian contemporary sculptor.

== Biography ==
Taher Shekh Al Hokamaii was born in Kazerun Count, Fars province of Iran. He studied sculpture at Tehran University College of Fine Arts, receiving his BFA degree in sculpture in 1988, and his Ph.D. equivalency in sculpture in 2005.

His notable contributions to the international sculpture symposium includes the design and implementation of Kindness (محبت) in Lebanon, Windward (بادگیر) in Bahrain, Bob Ol-Eshgh (باب العشق) in Dubai, Sanctuary (محراب) in Kuwait, Safe Zone (مکان امن)]in Dubai and Commemoration of Victims of Chemical Weapons] in Hague, Netherlands to name a few. His works of art and monuments have been exhibited in 17 countries.

== Papers in National Journals ==
Azami, Zahra, Mohammad Ali Sheikhol hokamaei, and Taher Sheikh alhokmaei. "A Comparative Study of Stucco Design and plants Motifs in Ctesiphon Palace and Early Iranian Mosques." Honar-ha-ye-Ziba 18, no. 4 (2013): 15.

== Works ==
Shekholhokamaei's works are listed below.

=== Memorial monuments and statues ===
- Design and construction of the memorial monument of Nelson Mandela, commemorating his visit to University of Tehran (1992)
- Design and implementation of Khorramshahr city's 3 meter-high steel statue titled "Mother" (1996)
- Design and construction of Abadan city's 5 meter-high bronze memorial monument titled "Jahad Sazandegi" (1997)
- Design and construction of Abadan city's 2 meter-high bronze memorial monument titled "Peyk Shahadat" (1997)
- Design and construction of Susangerd city's 2 meter-high bronze twin memorial monuments installed at Tatk Alley (1998)
- Design and construction of Master Hossein Behzad 80 cm high portrait in bronze at Kish Island (1999)
- Design and construction of 3 meter- high The Compassion (محبت) monument, Iranian Artists Forum, Tehran (2009)

=== International Exhibitions and Biennials ===
- Baku, Azerbaijan Group Exhibition – Sculptures (1992)
- Lalit Kala Museum, Delhi, India Triennial Exhibition (1995)
- Sharjah, UAE International Exhibition (1999)
- Caracas, Venezuela Group Exhibition – Sculptures (1999)
- Kiev, Ukraine Group Exhibition – Sculptures (1999)
- Beirut, Lebanon Group Exhibition at International Symposium (2000)
- Monte Carlo, France Group Exhibition – Sculptures (2002)
- Paris, France Cité internationale des arts, Iran Studio (2004)
- Dhaka, Bangladesh Iranian Artists Group Exhibition (2005)

== See also ==
- Culture of Iran
- Islamic art
- Iranian art
- List of Iranian artists
