= 712 (disambiguation) =

712 is a year in history. 712 may also refer to:

- 712 (album), by Shonen Knife
- 712 (MBTA bus)
- 712 (New Jersey bus)
- 712 (number)

== See also ==
- 7/12 (disambiguation)
