= Rokni =

Rokni is a name. Notable people with this name include:

- David Rokni (1932–2026), Israeli colonel
- Kamiar Rokni (born 1976), Pakistani fashion designer and media personality
- Mojtaba Rokni, coaching staff analyzer for Persepolis Shomal F.C., an Iranian association football club
- Rokni Haerizadeh (born 1978), Iranian artist

== See also ==
- Ramin, Rokni, Hesam, a UAE-based artist collective, of which Rokni Haerizadeh is a member
