= Kamrooz Aram =

American artist

- کامروز آرام
- Born: 1978 (age 47–48); Shiraz, Iran
- Education: Maryland Institute College of Art; Columbia University
- Known for: Painting drawing installation art collage
- Website: http://www.kamroozaram.com

Kamrooz Aram (Persian: کامروز آرام; b.1978 in Shiraz, Iran) is a contemporary artist whose diverse artistic practice engages the complicated relationship between traditional non-Western art and Western Modernism. Through a variety of forms including painting, collage, drawing and installation, Aram has found the potential for image-making to function critically in its use as a tool for a certain renegotiation of history. He lives and works in Brooklyn, New York.

== Life and career ==
Kamrooz Aram received a B.F.A. in 2001 from Maryland Institute College of Art (MICA). Aram received his Master's degree in Fine Arts from Columbia University in 2003.

Solo and two-person exhibitions include Ornament for Indifferent Architecture (2017) at Museum Dhondt-Dhaenens, Deurle, Belgium; Recollections for a Room (2016–2017) and Unstable Paintings for Anxious Interiors at Green Art Gallery, Dubai, UAE (2016; 2014); Kamrooz Aram/Julie Weitz at Michelle Grabner's space The Suburban, Chicago, Illinois (2013); Brute Ornament: Kamrooz Aram and Seher Shah, curated by Murtaza Vali, at Green Art Gallery, Dubai, UAE (2012); Negotiations at Perry Rubenstein Gallery, New York, New York (2011); Generation After Generation, Revolution after Revelation at LAXART, Los Angeles, California (2010) and Kamrooz Aram: Realms and Reveries at the Massachusetts Museum of Contemporary Art (MASS MoCA), North Adams, Massachusetts (2006).

He has shown in numerous group exhibitions including Beauty Reigns: A Baroque Sensibility in Recent Painting, McNay Art Museum, San Antonio, TX (2014); roundabout, City Gallery Wellington, New Zealand (2010); the Busan Biennale, (2006); MoMA PS1's Greater New York 2005; and the Prague Biennale I (2003). His most recent solo exhibitions include: Arabesque, Green Art Gallery, Dubai (2019); An Object, A Gesture, A Décor, FLAG Art Foundation, NY (2018); FOCUS: Kamrooz Aram, The Modern Art Museum of Fort Worth, TX, USA (2018); Ancient Blue Ornament, Atlanta Contemporary, Atlanta, GA, USA (2018); Ornament for Indifferent Architecture, Museum Dhondt-Dhaenens, Belgium (2017).

Aram was one of the winners of the Abraaj Group Art Prize 2014; he has also been awarded grants from Art Matters (2014), the New York Foundation for the Arts (2004) and the Jacob K. Javits Fellowship Program (2001). His work has been featured and reviewed widely in publications such as Art in America, Artforum.com, The New York Times, Asian Art Newspaper, The Village Voice and the arts and culture segment on BBC Persian: Tamasha.

Aram's work can be found in public collections including the Metropolitan Museum of Art, New York; Cincinnati Art Museum, Cincinnati, Ohio; Rose Art Museum at Brandeis University, Waltham, MA; the Modern Art Museum of Fort Worth in Texas; and M+, Hong Kong.

Kamrooz Aram's artwork is featured in the eight second edition of Whitney Biennial in 2026.

On the eighty-two edition of Whitney Biennial 2026, one of his artworks, "Luster on the Blue Gaze" shows the artwork describing it as a piece of artwork as a painting and a book cover at the same time playing double duty.

== See also ==
- Islamic art
- Iranian art
- Islamic calligraphy
- Iranian modern and contemporary art
- List of Iranian artists
