= Homayoun Salimi =

Iranian painter and academic (b. 1948)

- Born: 1948 (age 77–78); Tehran, Iran
- Education: Mirak Tabrizi Conservatory, Iran; Beaux Art, Paris; Sorbonne
- Known for: Painter
- Style: Geometric abstraction

Homayoun Salimi (Persian: همايون سليمی; born 1948) is an Iranian Painter, Printmaker and academic, born in Tehran, Iran. He was the head of Department of Painting at Tehran University of Art in Tehran. He is one of the foremost exponents of the geometric abstract style in Iran.

== Life and career ==
Homayoun Salimi was born in 1948, in Tehran. He received his earliest art education at the Mirak Tabrizi Conservatory and later travelled to France to further his studies. In 1978 he obtained a Diploma of Higher Education With Rocheron Prise, at the École des Beaux-Arts in Paris and in 1982 he obtained a master's degree of aesthetics and sciences of art from the Sorbonne and in 1990, he obtained his Ph.D., also in aesthetics and sciences of art, from Sorbonne.

He is currently a faculty member of the University of Tehran.

== Work ==
Salimi and his contemporary, Habib Ayatollahi, are the only examples of artists working in geometric abstract, and is considered as one of the foremost exponents of the geometric abstract style in Iran.

== See also ==
- Islamic art
- Iranian art
- Islamic calligraphy
- List of Iranian artists
