= Iman Maleki =

Iranian Realist painter (born 1976)

- ایمان ملکی
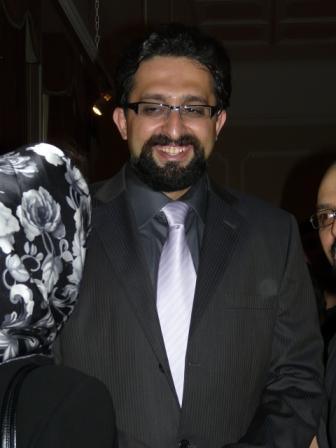
- Born: 1976 (age 49–50); Tehran, Iran
- Education: Llotja School, Barcelona
- Known for: Painter
- Movement: Realist
- Website: Official Website of Imān Maleki

Imān Maleki (Persian: ایمان ملکی) (born 1976 in Tehran, Iran) is an Iranian Realist painter.

== Life and career ==
Iman Maleki's fascination with painting began as a child. He started taking lessons in painting at the age of fifteen. His first and only teacher in painting was the celebrated Iranian painter Mortezā Kātouziān. His career as a professional painter began during this period. Maleki studied, from 1995, at the Fine Arts Faculty of University of Tehran, from where he graduated in Graphic Design in 1999. Since 1998 he has presented several exhibitions of his paintings. In 2000 Maleki established Ārā Painting Studio (آتلیه نقاشی آرا) where he also teaches painting.

During the Second International Art Renewal Center Salon (TM) Competition in 2005, Maleki was awarded The William Bouguereau Award – Emotion Theme and the Figure for his painting Omens of Hafez (Fāl-e Hāfez) and a Chairman's Choice Award for his other painting, A Girl by the Window, (Dokhtari Dar Kenār-e Panjareh).

Maleki has been married since 2000. Maleki's Dizziness is featured at the Farjam Collection in Dubai at the exhibition Iran Inside Out. He is represented internationally by Artists Advocacy Group, an artists representation firm in Great Falls, VA.

== See also ==
- Islamic art
- Iranian art
- Iranian Art and Architecture
- List of contemporary Iranian scientists, scholars, and engineers
- List of Iranian artists
- Université du Québec à Montréal
- List of Iranian philosophers
- List of Iranian women writers
- Persian arts
- Photorealism
- Women's rights movement in Iran
