= 7/12 =

7/12 may refer to:

- July 12 (month-day date notation), the 193rd day of the year (194th in leap years) in the Gregorian calendar
- 7 December (day-month date notation), the 341st day of the year (342nd in leap years) in the Gregorian calendar
- 7/12 extract, Indian extract from the land register

== See also ==
- 12/7 (disambiguation)
