= Khosrow Hassanzadeh =

Iranian painter and artist (1963–2023)

- خسرو حسن‌زاده
- Born: 21 December 1963; Tehran, Iran
- Died: 2 July 2023 (aged 59)
- Education: Mojtama-e-Honar University; Azad University
- Known for: Painter, installation artist and ceramist
- Style: Political art

Khosrow Hassanzadeh (Persian: خسرو حسن‌زاده; 21 December 1963 – 2 July 2023) was an Iranian painter, printmaker and installation artist.

== Life and career ==
Hassanzadeh was born on 21 December 1963 in Tehran, to a working-class Azerbaijani family who were fruit-sellers. He was just 17 years old when the Iran-Iraq war broke out, and he dropped out of school and enlisted in the Basiji militia, but was subsequently obliged to remain as a conscript. When he returned from the war, he chose to work on themes that reflected his experiences of war.

Following his return to civilian life, he studied art, enrolling in the Mojtama-e-Honar University (1989–1991) where he studied painting and later at the Persian Literature at Azad University (1995–99), both in Tehran. His art teachers advised him to "draw small" so that his work would be marketable, but he ignored this advice. From the outset, he was determined to paint large murals and posters.

Hassanzadeh first exhibited in the 1980s, but only gained international recognition with War (1998), a grim and trenchant diary of his own experiences as a volunteer soldier during the Iran-Iraq war (1980–1988). In Ashura (2000) a 'women-friendly' interpretation of the most revered Shiite religious ceremony, he depicted chador-clad women engulfed by religious iconography. Chador (2001) and Prostitutes (2002) continued his exploration of sociological themes particular to Iran's hyper-gendered urban landscape. The latter paintings used police mug shots to pay tribute to sixteen prostitutes murdered by a serial killer in Mashhad, a religious capital of Iran. The paintings were created after filmmaker Maziar Bahari commissioned Hassanzadeh to create a poster for his film, And Along Came a Spider. In Terrorist (2004) the artist questioned the concept of 'terrorism' in international politics by portraying himself, his mother, and sisters as 'terrorists'.

Unlike many of his contemporaries who have left Iran, Hassanzadeh chose to continue to live and work as an artist in Iran. He was based in Tehran, where he worked as an actor, visual artist, and ceramist. His work featured in many exhibitions in Europe and the Middle East. Time magazine once described him as one of the country's "hottest" artists.

Hassanzadeh died due to methanol poisoning on 2 July 2023, at the age of 59.

== Work ==
Hassanzadeh's works often deal with issues that are considered sensitive in Iranian society and therefore he was frequently referred to as a 'political' artist or 'pop' artist. Scholars have described his style as somewhere between dissident and regime art. The artist, himself, called his work "people's art" because it deals with social issues that affect everyday people. His work is influenced by the Saqqa Kaneh movement and traditional Iranian art.

Hassanzadeh enjoyed solo shows in Amsterdam, Beirut, Dubai, London, Phnom Penh, and Tehran. His work is held by the British Museum, the Tehran Museum of Contemporary Art (TMOCA), the World Bank, and the Tropenmuseum, among other venues and collections. Hassanzadeh worked primarily with painting, silkscreen, mosaics, and mixed media.

Select list of works

- Early Paintings, series, 1988–1998
- Mother, pastel on paper, series, 1988
- Do I Have to Sign, oil on canvas, 180 × 120 cm, 1999
- Ashoura installation (collaboration with Sadegh Tirakhan), exhibited at TMOCA, Summer, 2001
- Terrorist, a four piece series, 2004
- Ya Mi Modal, silkscreen and oil on paper, 200 × 200 cm, 2008
- Ready to Order, mixed media, 215 × 135 × 28 cm, 2009
- Dome mosaic, ceramic plate, 2010
- Remember, mixed media on ceramic tile, 2010

== Literature ==
- Shatanawi, Mirjam, Tehran Studio Works. The Art of Khosrow Hassanzadeh. London: Saqi Books, 2007.
- Shatanawi, Mirjam, 'The disquieting art of Khosrow Hassanzadeh', in: ISIM Review 18, Autumn 2006, pp. 54–55.

== See also ==
- Islamic art
- Iranian art
- List of Iranian artists
