= Pegah Anvarian =

Iranian-American fashion designer

- پگاه انواریان
- Born: Iran
- Other name: Pegah Anvarian Watson
- Occupations: Fashion designer, fashion stylist, creative director, interior designer

Pegah Anvarian (born c. 1980s; Persian: پگاه انواریان) is an Iranian-born American fashion designer, fashion stylist, creative director, and interior designer. She had her fashion design label from 2005 until the spring of 2008. Her design work has shown at Los Angeles Fashion Week and New York Fashion Week. Anvarian worked as the creative director for the Three Dots fashion label, starting in 2009. Starting in 2014, she is the creative director of Poetry & Prose fashion label. She also known as Pegah Anvarian Watson.

== Biography ==
Pegah Anvarian was born in Iran and raised in Dallas, Texas. Her father worked as a photographer, and her mother was an educator. Her mother taught her to sew at age six, and two years later she was designing clothing at the age of eight. She never attended any formal design school.

== Career ==
Anvarian began a year tour with the American rock band The B-52's as their stylist. She also designed the costumes for one of The B-52s' music video. This early career allowed Anvarian to relocate to New York City in 1996.

Anvarian is known for her draped jersey tops and dresses, as well as a cashmere jersey knit dress. In the Fall of 2003, she presented her line at Los Angeles Fashion Week for her first collection that debuted. In the Fall of 2004, her work featured many low cuts, off-the-shoulder tops, and halter tunics. In 2007, she debuted at New York Fashion Week and her work included leather and textured-wool bubble jackets and bolero jackets, and it was noted she had some fit issues with her bottoms. Her 2007, work was astrology-themed in dark colors, this included star prints, tissue-thin washed wool tops, jersey dresses with low tops, draped coats, and biker jackets with fitted sleeves. In spring 2008, her own fashion label closed.

Santino Rice worked under Anvarian before his involvement with the television series Project Runway in 2005.

In 2007 Pegah Anvarian was chosen to design the annual Mercedes-Benz Fashion Week in Manhattan. At the time she stated, "I've always wanted to show in New York. It's exciting to have the opportunity to do it the right way!"

Her fashion has been seen on celebrities such as Rachel Zoe, Tracee Ellis Ross, Cameron Diaz, LeAnn Rimes, and Naomi Watts. She has been spotted in many publications such as Lucky, The New York Times, The Los Angeles Times, W magazine, Washington Post, and Harper's Bazaar.

== See also ==
- List of Iranian artists
