= Akbar Behkalam =

German-Iranian painter and sculptor (1944–2025)

- Born: 16 September 1944; Tabriz, Iran
- Died: 7 February 2025 (aged 80); Berlin, Germany
- Education: Tabriz Art School
- Known for: Painter
- Website: Official site for Akbar Behkalam

Akbar Behkalam (Persian: اکبر بهکلام, 16 September 1944 – 7 February 2025) was an Iranian-born German painter.

== Biography ==
Akbar Behkalam was born in Tabriz, Iran on 16 September 1944, the capital of the Iranian province East Azerbaijan. From 1961 until 1964, he studied art at Tabriz Art School. After his military service he moved to Istanbul, where he enrolled at the Mimar Sinan University in Fine Arts and became the student of professor Bedri Rahmi Eyüboğlu.

From 1972 until 1974, he lived in different European cities, including Paris, Frankfurt, Rome and Berlin. In 1974, he went back to Iran, to teach at the Tabriz Art School. In 1976, he left Iran for political reasons. He lived in Berlin. As of 1989, he had a studio in Brandenburg.

In 1989, he published the book, Movement and Change Paintings and Sketches: 1977–1988.

Behkalam was married to a German woman, and together they had two children. He died in Berlin on 7 February 2025, at the age of 80.

== Art ==
Akbar Behkalam's early works often deal with political subjects, but over time they became increasingly abstract. His early works are influenced by the New European Realism, in a symbiosis with Persian miniature painting. His later works, up to present time can be described as abstract-expressive. A focal point of his works is the depiction of the formation and choreography of mass movements.

One recurring theme in his works is the turbulent history of his home country Iran: the series "Persepolis" (1977–1979) deals with old Persian iconography, that is confronted with the depiction of the execution squads of the Shah-regime. In the eighties he produced the series "Justice in Allah's Name", that has the religiously legitimized human rights violations of the Islamic Republic as its central theme.

From 1984 to 1986 Behkalam did extensive research on the German revolution of 1848 and produced several large scale paintings on that subject that were presented in his solo exhibition at the Staatliche Kunsthalle Berlin (State Art Gallery Berlin) in 1986.

Behkalam showed his works in many exhibitions in Europe, Asia and North and South America. In 2009 he was the winner of the Tashkent Biennial in Uzbekistan.

== See also ==
- Baghdad School
- Islamic art
- Iranian art
- Islamic calligraphy
- List of Iranian artists
