= Darvish Fakhr =

Iranian American artist

- Born: 1969 (age 56–57); Newfoundland, Canada
- Education: School of the Museum of Fine Arts, Boston; Slade School of Fine Art, London
- Known for: Painter of portraits
- Website: artist website

Darvish Fakhr (born 1969) is an Iranian American artist born in Newfoundland. He is an artist in the field of Iranian portrait paintings.

== Biography ==
Born in 1969, Fakhr grew up in the U.S. before moving to Britain where his practice has been based for the last two decades.

Fakhr trained at the School of the Museum of Fine Arts, Boston and the Slade School of Fine Art in London. In 2004 he won the BP Travel Award and used the opportunity to go to Iran and paint local people in Tehran and Isfahan.

Fakhr's paintings show the depths of emotion behind outwardly ritualised lives and aim to help us understand the common humanity that links the Western world and the Middle East. He explores the relationship between shared memory and the passage of time, looking both to the past and the future. He currently lives in Brighton, Sussex.

== Exhibitions ==
- 2014 "Palimpsest" Edge of Arabia, London
- 2013 "Farce" Aun Gallery, Tehran
- 2011 "Safar" Aun Gallery, Tehran
- 2008 Commissioned by Jerwood Gallery to paint Akram Khan. The nine-piece panel is now part of the permanent collection at the National Portrait Gallery, London.
- 2007 "Embodiment" group show- Signal Gallery, Hoxton, London
- 2006 Included in Publication, "The Portrait Now" by Sandy Nairne and Sarah Howgate
- 2003 Royal Society of Portrait Painters, Mall Galleries, London
- 2003 Quod Art Gallery, Brighton
- 2002 Chelsea Art Fair, London
- 2001 Medici Gallery, Piccadilly, London
- 2001 Discerning Eye, Mall Galleries, London
- 2001 Royal West of England Academy, 3rd Place, Bristol
- 1998 Exhibition of Portraits at Blue Gallery, Chelsea
- 1997 Degree Show, Slade School of Fine Art
- 1993 Annual Boit Competition, Museum School, Boston, Mass.

== Awards ==
- 2007 BP Award- National Portrait Gallery, London and Edinburgh
- 2006 BP Award- National Portrait Gallery, London and Aberdeen
- 2005 BP Travel Award Show, National Portrait Gallery, London and Edinburgh
- 2004 Winner of BP Travel Award, National Portrait Gallery, London
- 2000 BP Award – National Portrait Gallery, London and Aberdeen
- 1999 BP Award – National Portrait Gallery, London and Aberdeen
- 1998 BP Award – National Portrait Gallery, London and Aberdeen

== See also ==
- Islamic art
- Iranian art
- Islamic calligraphy
- List of Iranian artists
- Modern and contemporary art in Iran
