= 12/7 =

12/7 may refer to:

- December 7 (month-day date notation)
- 12 July (day-month date notation)
- 12 shillings and 7 pence in UK predecimal currency
- December 7th, the 341st day of the Gregorian Calendar (342nd day on leap years)
- 12th of July, the date
- The Japanese attack on Pearl Harbor on December 7th, 1941

== See also ==
- 127 (disambiguation)
- 7/12 (disambiguation)
