= Reza Khodadadi =

Iranian artist (born 1961)

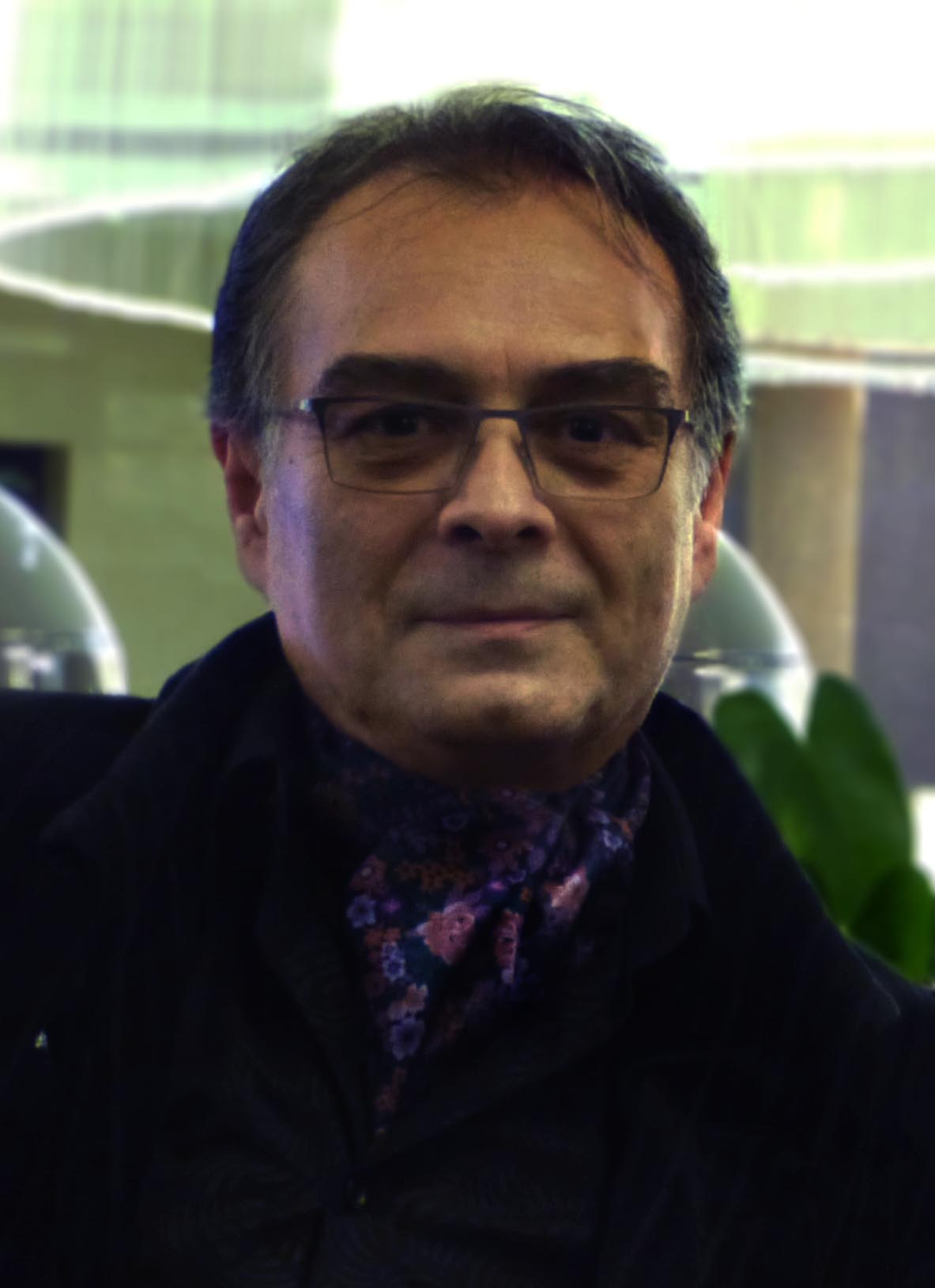
- Khodadadi in 2018
- Born: 26 February 1961 (age 65); Ardabil, Pahlavi Iran (now Iran)
- Known for: Painting, sculpture, public art, urban art, academic, writer

Reza Khodadadi (Persian: رضا خدادادی; born 26 February 1961, in Ardabil) is an Iranian contemporary artist, professor, writer, painter, sculptor, urban artist, and muralist. He lives in Tehran.

He has a PhD in art research; and is a professor of art at the Tehran University of Art, and the president of Farabi International Campus. He is the author of Mural Techniques book and another eight books in the field of public art and murals, titled Rules and Regulations Urban Beautification.

== Exhibitions ==
He has had several solo exhibitions in Golestan Gallery, Barg Gallery, Haft Samar Gallery, Mah Art Gallery, Hoor Art Gallery and Boom Art Gallery. He has participated in over 140 domestic and foreign collective exhibitions.

== Books ==
- "Mural Techniques" Publisher: Sepand Minooand and the Beautification Organization of Tehran
- " Urban Rules and Regulations of the Beautification, volume 21: Ideation, Drawing and Implementation of Murals" Publisher: Sepand Minoo and the Beautification Organization of Tehran
- " Urban Rules and Regulations of the Beautification, volume 22: Mosaic Murals" Publisher: Sepand Minoo and the Beautification Organization of Tehran
- " Urban Rules and Regulations of the Beautification, volume, 23: MOARAQ Murals " Publisher: Sepand Minooand and the Beautification Organization of Tehran
- " Urban Rules and Regulations of the Beautification, volume 24: HAFT RANG (Painted Tile) Murals" Publisher: Sepand Minooand and the Beautification Organization of Tehran
- " Urban Rules and Regulations of the Beautification, volume 25: Broken Tile Murals " Publisher: Sepand Minooand and the Beautification Organization of Tehran
- " Urban Rules and Regulations of the Beautification, volume 26: Clay Relife Murals" Published by: Sepand Minooand and the Beautification Organization of Tehran
- " Urban Rules and Regulations of the Beautification, volume 27:"Stone Relief Murals " Publisher: Sepand Minooand and the Beautification Organization of Tehran
- " Urban Rules and Regulations of the Beautification, volume 28: Concrete Murals" Publisher: Sepand Minoo and the Beautification Organization of Tehran
- The Scientific Observer the Book of "Urban Furniture Coloring Guide", Urban Rules and Regulations of the Beautification, the Beautification Organization of Tehran
- The Scientific Observer the Book of "Preparing the pre-Painting Surfaces" Urban Rules and Regulations of the Beautification. the Beautification Organization of Tehran
- The scientific observer of the book "Applying the cover in painting the surfaces" Urban Rules and Regulations of the Beautification, the Beautification Organization of Tehran.

== Research projects ==
- Research project study "Art Events of Iran in Calendar ", University of Art Complex (Art University) 1990
- Application research project "Design and Manufacturing of "Bafg / Bandar Abbas Railway", Ministry of Railways,1994
- Application research project for "Design and Manufacturing of the "Mashhad / Sarakhs Railways", Ministry of Roads of the Railway Administration, 1996
- Application research project "Design and Manufacturing of "Karkheh dam" with pneumatic movable components - Ministry of Energy / Karkhe Dam 1999-2000
- "Design and Manufacturing "Contemporary Indian Art ", Institute of Visual Arts / Tehran Museum of Contemporary Arts 2000
- Research project study “ Murals of Tehran: musts and musts not”, The Beautification Organization of Tehran, 2013
- Author several scientific articles and essays.
- Various lectures at universities and scientific and cultural centers.
- Judging and evaluating of research projects, articles and books.

== Associations ==
- Secretary of the “New Thought Segment” the Tehran Beautification Organization.
- Member of Iranian Association of Official Experts
- Expert of Association of Official in Art affairs Member of Iranian Association of Official Experts
- Honorary Member of Institute for Promotion of Contemporary Visual Art, Iran.
- Member of Scientific Committee and Jury of 2nd Iranian Lighting Design Conference and Professional Lighting Convention.
- Member of Scientific Committee and Jury of the 23rd International Exhibition of Home Furniture.(Tehran International Permanent Fairground).
- Member of Jury “The first National Award for Best Furniture ”(PFN AWARD 2014).

== See also ==
- Islamic art
- Iranian art
- Islamic calligraphy
- List of Iranian artists
