= Nader Davoodi =

Iranian photographer

- Born: 9 January 1963 (age 63); Iran
- Known for: Photojournalism, author

Nader Davoodi (Persian: نادر داوودی; born 9 January 1963) is an Iranian photojournalist. For the past two decades, he has been working to produce ethnographically detailed works that document a critical period in contemporary Iranian history. He is the first Iranian sports photographer to cover the FIFA World Cup (USA 1994), and his photo of Yordan Lechkov's goal against Germany won him the best sports picture of the year award in the annual Iranian sport's photo contest.

== Career ==
His coverage of the 12th Asian Games (Hiroshima 1994) is a collection of the games and sidelines of the most important Asian sports event, while 1994, 1998 & 2006 World Cups in the US, France & Germany were covered as the most important international sport occasions. In 2000, he covered the Sydney Olympic Games, publishing a book entitled Sydney 2000. The book includes the most notable sidelines covering different nationalities in significant personal moments. He is a founding member of The International Soccer Cartoon Contest, held in 1999 for the first time.

He is one of the first Iranian photographers to have an exhibition in the month of photography in Toronto (Contact 2005), with the title Breaking the Rules at the University of Toronto. Currently residing in Toronto, Ontario, he is a Founding Member of the Iranian Photojournalists Association (1998) and one of the first to create an all English photoblog on Iran (July 2005). He is the publisher of Tamashagaran Weekly.

He has published four books titled Iran on its way to the World Cup, A simple Event, Iranian Artifacts in the Metropolitan Museum of Art, and Sydney 2000 as writer and editor. His documentary, 13 and a Half, co-directed with Abbas Ahmadi, premiered on October 1, 2006, at the 25th Vancouver International Film Festival.

== See also ==
- Culture of Iran
- Islamic art
- Iranian art
- Iranian art and architecture
- List of Iranian artists
