= Malekeh Nayiny =

Iranian artist (born 1955)

Malekeh Nayiny (Persian: ملکه نائینی; born 1955) is an Iranian-born French artist, known for her digital photo collage and paintings. Her best known series of work is "Updating a Family Album" (1997–present). She lives and works in Paris.

== Biography ==
Malekeh Nayiny was born in 1955 in Tehran, Iran. She received a B.A. degree in fine arts and photography from Syracuse University, continuing her studies at the Parsons School of Design and the International Center of Photography. She earned a certificate in digital photography from the Spéos Paris Photographic Institute in 1997.

Nayiny's work has appeared in exhibitions in Dubai, Paris, London, Turin, New York City, Houston, Madrid, Cahors, Valencia, Geneva, Verona, Tehran and Portugal. In 2019 her work was included in the exhibition My Iran: Six Women Photographers along with Hengameh Golestan, Newsha Tavakolian, Shadi Ghadirian, Gohar Dashti, and Mitra Tabrizian at the Arthur M. Sackler Gallery.

Her work is included in the collections of the Arthur M. Sackler Gallery, the British Museum, and the Los Angeles County Museum of Art,
