= Hossein Behzad =

Iranian painter (1894–1968)

- حسین بهزاد
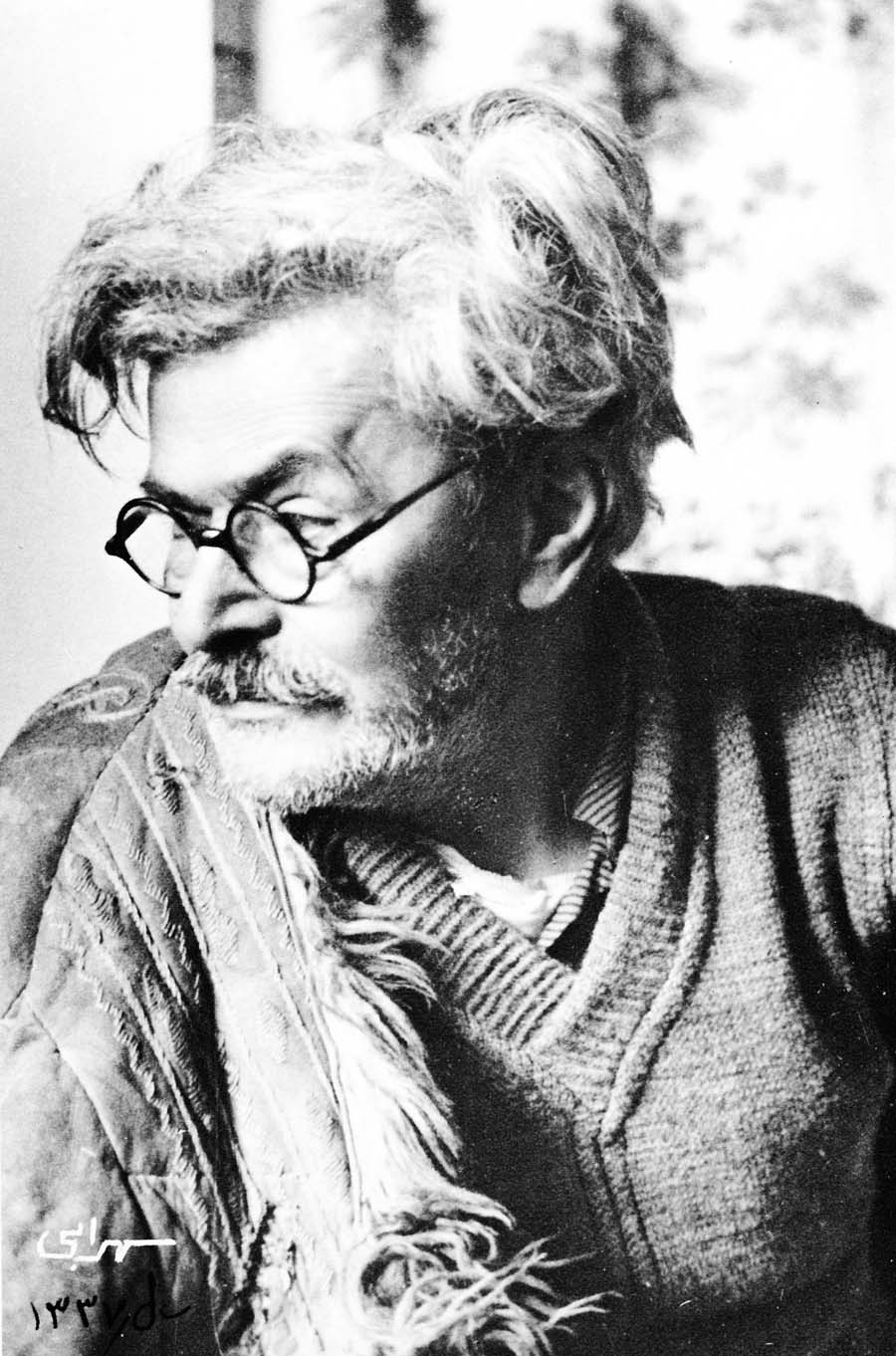
- Behzad in 1958
- Born: 1894; Shiraz, Qajar Iran
- Died: 13 October 1968 (aged 73–74); Pahlavi Iran
- Known for: Painter

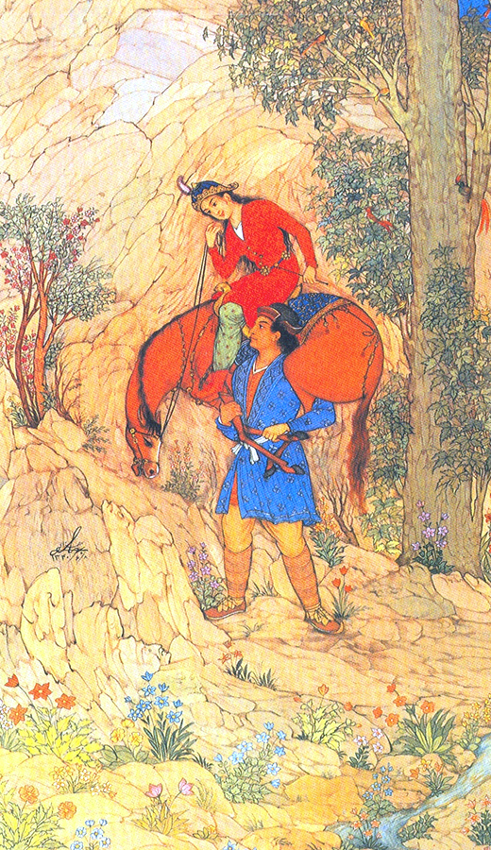
1951 miniature painting by master Behzad depicting the story of Farhad and Shirin.

Hossein Behzad (1894 – 13 October 1968; Persian: حسین بهزاد) was a prominent Iranian painter. His early work was in the styles of the old masters of Persian painting of the sixteenth and seventeenth centuries, hoping to save Persian miniature painting from oblivion.

== Biography ==
Hossein Behzad was born in Shiraz, Iran in 1894 to Mirza Lotfollah Esfahani. His father was a pen-holder designer.

He married Azizeh Khanom in 1921, who gave birth to their only child, Parviz.

During the early 1930s, Behzad reorganized Tehran's Sanaye Mostazrafeh Art School. In 1934 he left Tehran for Paris and stayed for thirteen months. During this time which time he studied various Eastern and Western painting styles at the Louvre, Guimet museum and Palace of Versailles. It was during this trip developed a completely new style of miniature painting, combining aspects of traditional Persian painting with contemporary painting from the West.

Behzad left behind about 400 miniature works. His miniature style is much closer to Persian attire and culture, and it differs from Western watercolor designs

He became internationally known and won many awards including the 'first class medal of the ministry of culture' from Iran in 1949 and the 'first class medal of international painting' from Minneapolis, USA in 1958. In 1968 Behzad was give an honorary professorship by the College of Ornamental Arts, Behzad's works have been displayed across the world. To celebrate the millennium of Avicenna, in 1953 he held an exhibition at the Museum of Ancient Iran. This caused a sensation and was seen by many international visitors. The paintings on show, which took ten years to complete, included the likes of Ferdowsi and the Maedan Arch. The exhibition became particularly important to scholars of oriental studies. In an article for the Vatan newspaper of Istanbul, Professor Soheil Anwar wrote, "Behzad, this great artist does not belong only to Iran. He now belongs to the world."

Shortly after, and to much critical acclaim, Behzad held an exhibition, which was sponsored by the French government, at the Musée d'Art Moderne de Paris. The exhibition was opened by the French minister for culture on 18 May 1955.

He first practiced a conservative form of Neo-Safavidism, and later developed a new idiom that merged revivalism and modernism. In 1956, fifty of Behzad's miniatures were put on display at the Library of Congress, Washington DC. As Behzad became a living master, he held exhibitions across the world in cities such as London, Prague, New York, Boston and Brussels, as well as in India and Japan.

== Death and legacy ==
By 1968 Behzad had become ill and was sent twice to Europe by the Ministry of Culture. Despite this, Behzad died at 8:48pm on 13 October 1968 at the age of 74. He was buried at a cemetery near Imamzadeh Abdollah in Shahr-i Ray.

In honor of the artist, the Behzad Museum was founded in 1994, and is located in Tehran's Sa'dabad Complex and holds a large collection of his works.

== Awards ==
- 1968 – Honorary title of Art Master by the Council of the Art Instructors of the College of Decorative Arts, Tehran
- 1953 – Avicenna Medal from Museum of Ancient Iran
- 1952 – Olympic diploma for the best painting at the Olympic Painting Exhibition in Helsinki, Finland

== See also ==
- Baghdad School
- Islamic art
- Iranian art
- Islamic calligraphy
- List of Iranian artists
