= Shahram Entekhabi =

Shahram Entekhabi (Persian: شهرام انتخابی, born 1963) is a German-Iranian video and installation artist.

== Work ==
He participated in a group exhibition at the Chelsea Arts Museum, where his contribution was sex worker calling cards to which he had added full veils. In July 2009, The New York Times wrote in an art review, Iran Inside Out, regarding a similar piece, Shahram Entekhabi draws chadors in black Magic Marker on images of dating-service models.

Entekhabi caused a stir in Lucerne in January 2011 when he stretched red and white barrier tape across the city's Town Hall Bridge without first securing a permit, impeding traffic on a Friday afternoon.

== Foundation and Initiated projects ==
- WL PROJECT, curatorial and artistic projects, 2006
- i RAN Home, presentation of contemporary Iranian visual culture in Berlin, 2009
- UNITY, contemporary art projects against racism in collaboration with UNICEF in Penang, Malaysia, 2009
- Factory TT, an interdisciplinary network of artists and researchers founded in 2015 by artist Shahram Entekhabi and curator Asieh Salimian.
