= Alireza Karimi Moghaddam =

Iranian cartoonist

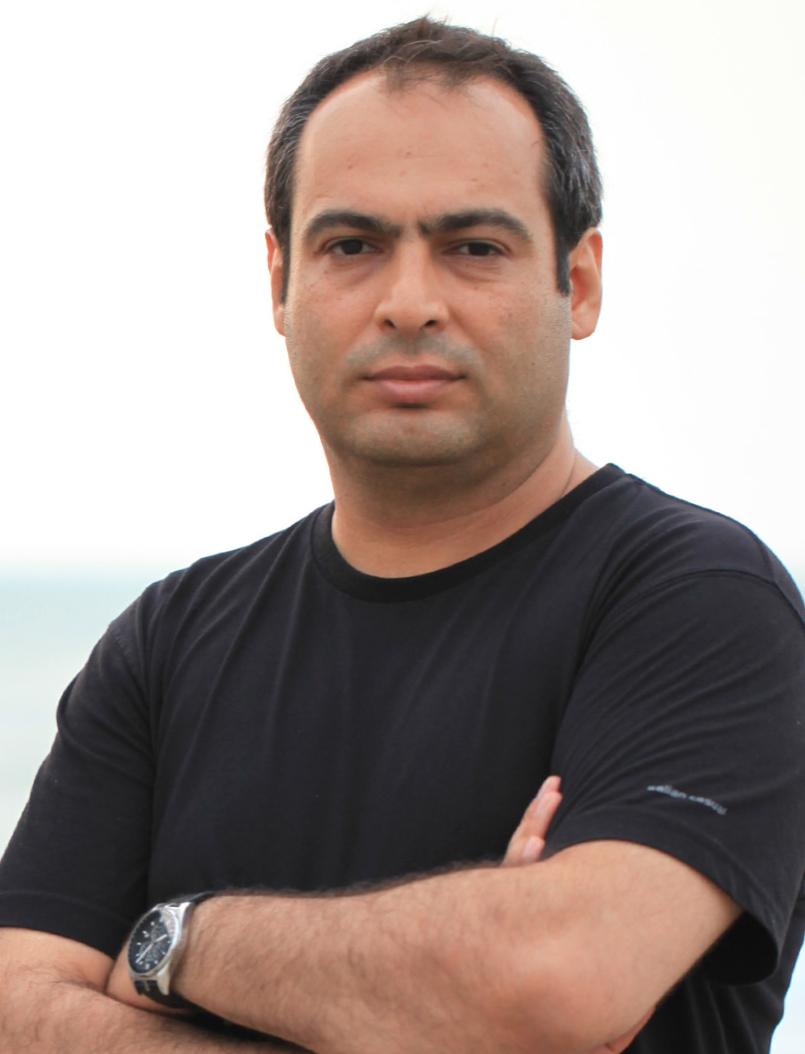
- Born: 1975-03-21 (age 26–27); Iran
- Education: Azad University
- Occupations: illustrator cartoonist

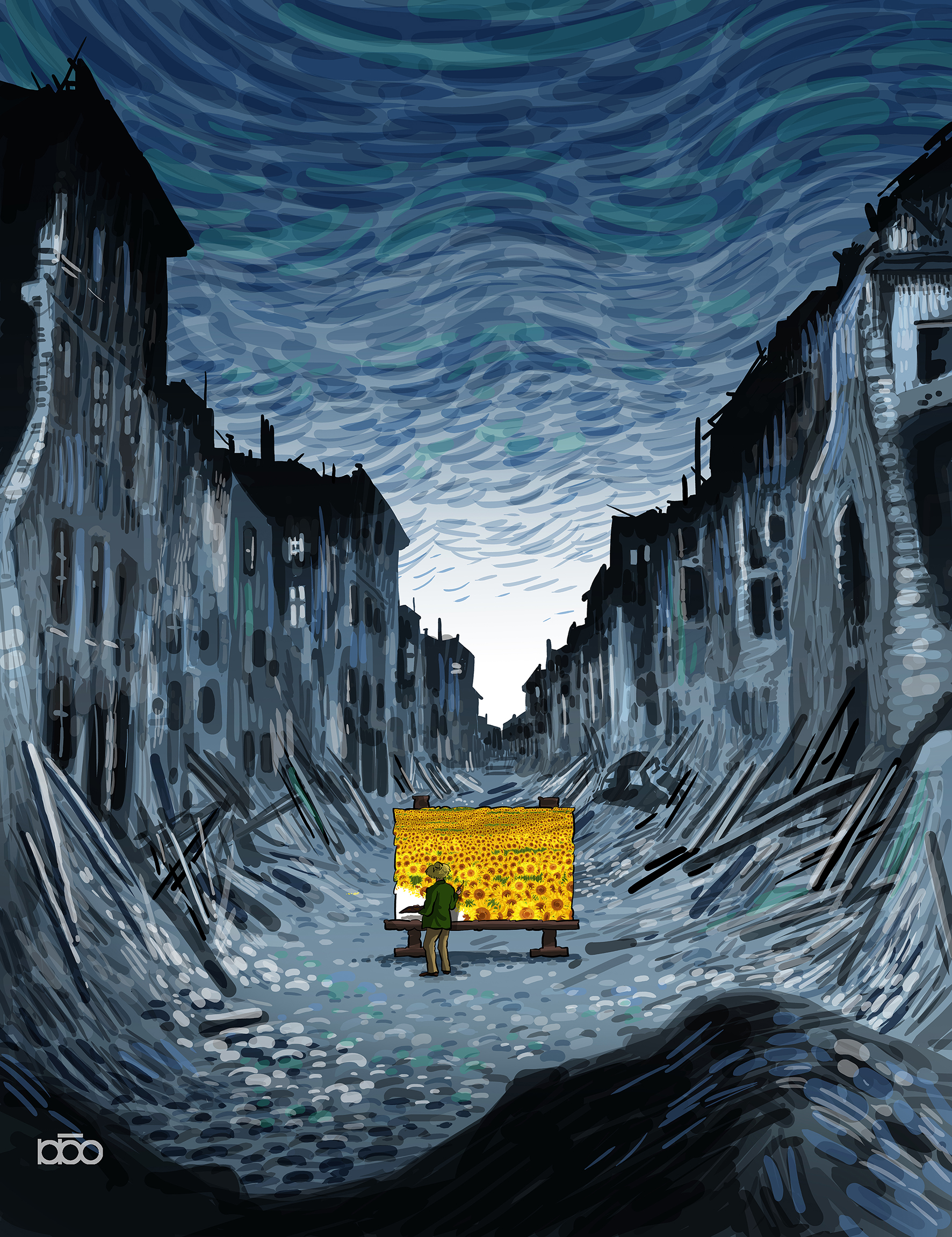
This cartoon is inspired by the life of "Vincent van Gogh".

Alireza Karimi Moghaddam (Persian: علیرضا کریمی مقدم, Born in 1975) is a cartoonist and illustrator. He is best known as the creator of a cartoon character representing the Dutch painter Vincent van Gogh. He has a master's degree in graphic design. He works as a lecturer in graphic design at the Azad University. As of 2021, he lives in Lisbon.

== Awards ==
- The “Sandro Carlesso” Special Prize to 48th Edition of the “Umoristi a Marostica”2018.
- The Special Prize to "SOLIN" Croatia -2019
- Finalists of 15.INTERNATIONAL CARTOON FESTIVAL - SOLIN 2019 (CROATIA)
- Winner of The International Exhibition of satirical graphic bucovina- Romania-2019
- Winner of Kaplanlar International Cartoon-Turkey -2018
- Winner of the 26. International Cartoon Competition The Golden Keg 2020″ / Slovakia
- Second prize of the 7th KalDer Bursa International Cartoon Contest -2020- Turkey
- Winner of the first International Caricature Competition / syria-2019
