= Ali Divandari =

Ali Divandari علی دیواندری
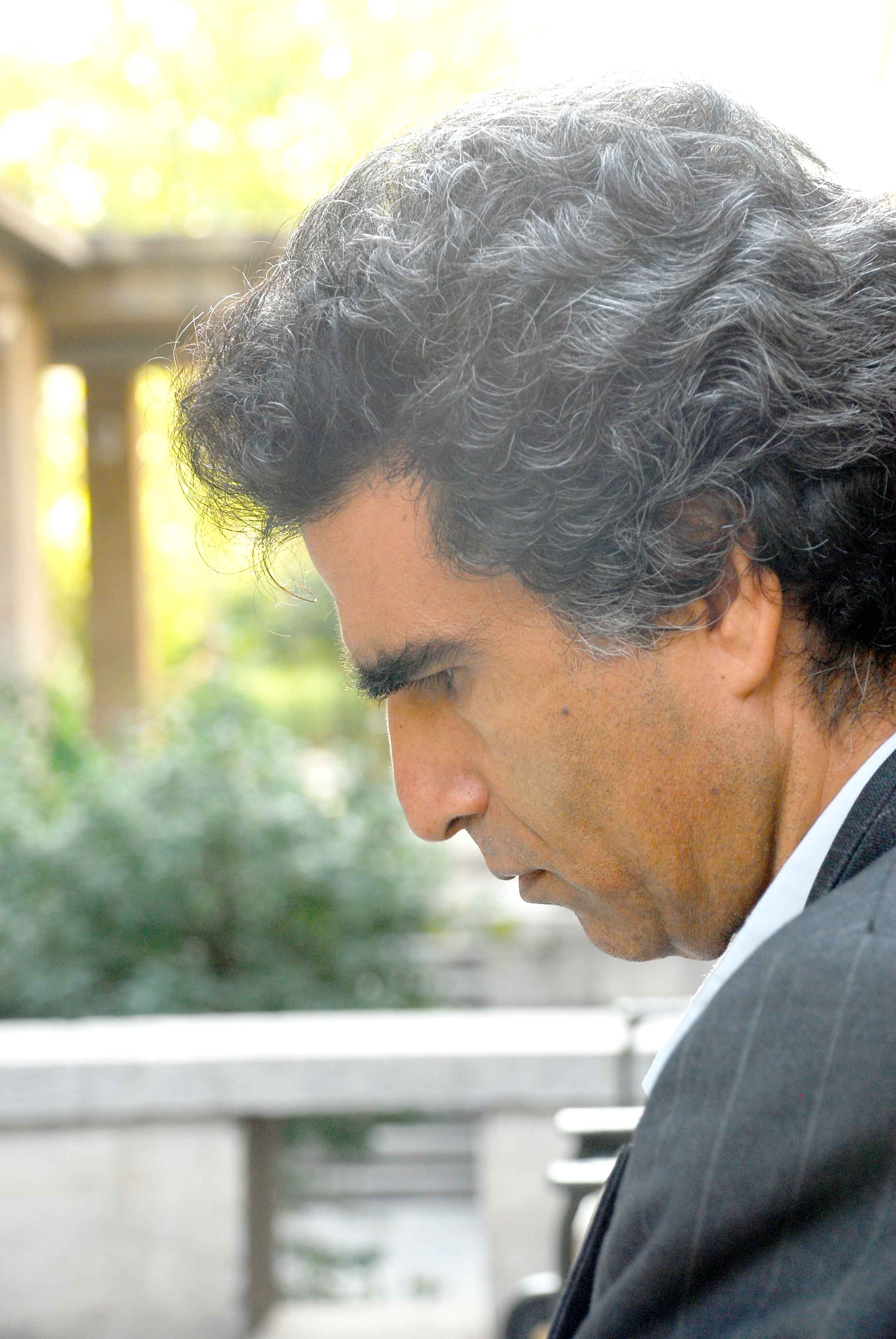
- Born: 6 September 1957 (age 68); Sabzevar, Iran
- Education: Faculty of Fine Arts at Tehran University
- Known for: Painting, Cartooning, Drawing, Graphic Design, Sculpture, Photography, Illustrating
- Movement: Surrealism, Action painting, Cubism, Conceptual art, Abstract art, Digital Art
- Awards: 46 int'l and 1 national awards
- Website: ali.divandari.com

Ali Divandari (Persian: علی دیواندری; also Romanized as Alī Divāndarī, Persian pronunciation: [æliː diːvɒːndæriː]; Born 6 September 1957 in Sabzevar) is an Iranian cartoonist, painter, graphic designer, sculptor and journalist.

== Biography ==
Divandari studied graphics at the Faculty of Fine Arts in Tehran University. He began his career as graphic designer and cartoonist in 1975. In 1997, he directed a new International Cartoon Festival in Iran with a main theme of "man and Nature – Only one, Share & Care". Over his career, Divandari was a jury member of several cartoon exhibitions in Iran and Turkey. His works have been published in many international newspapers and magazines and have been exhibited in more than 34 countries.

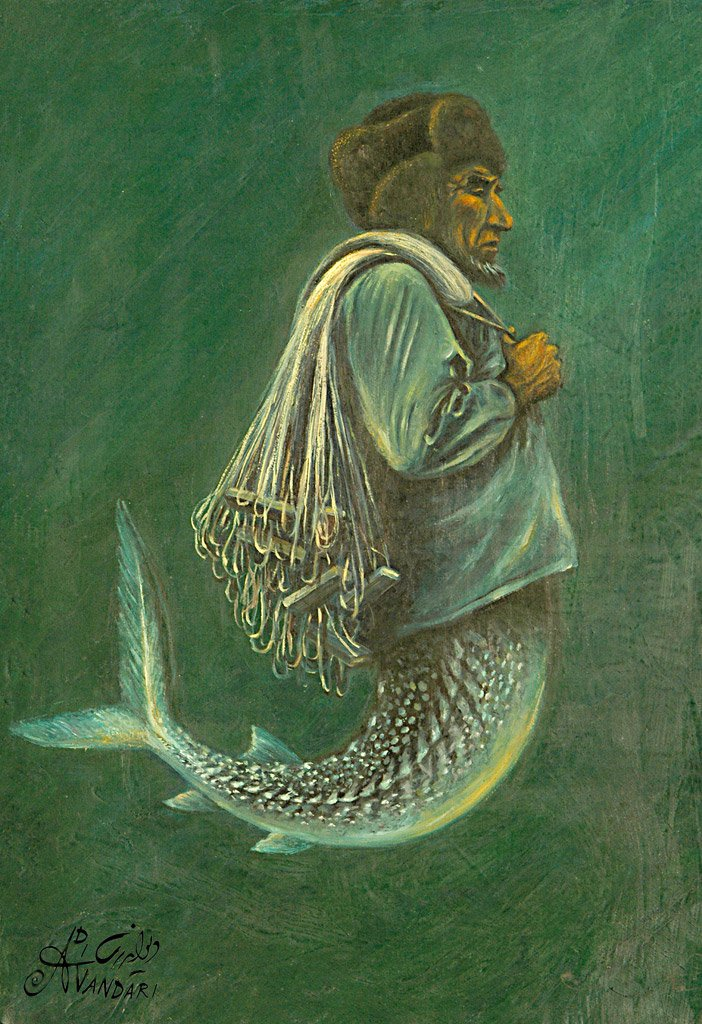
Painting by Ali Divandari

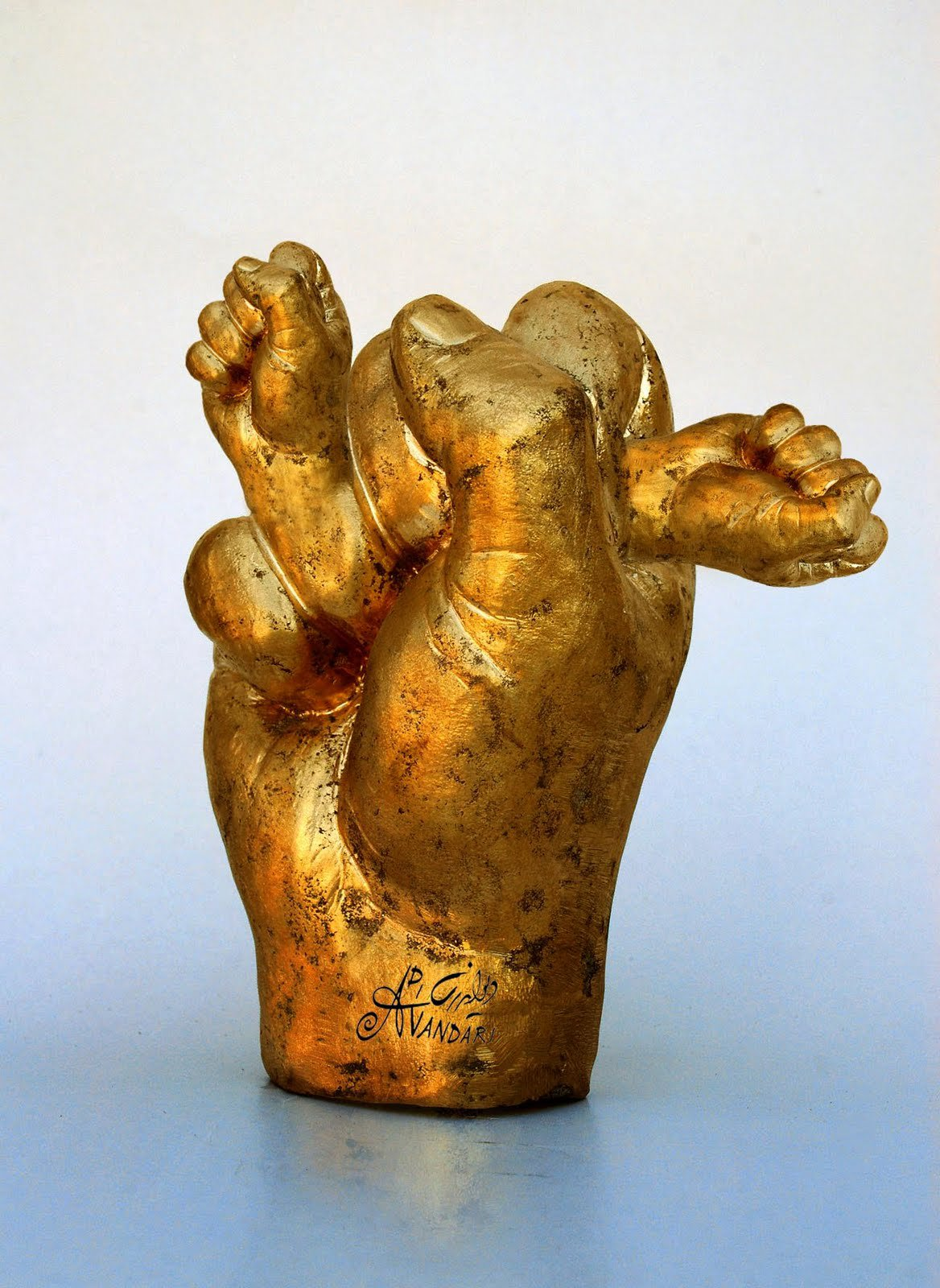
Sculpture by Ali Divandari

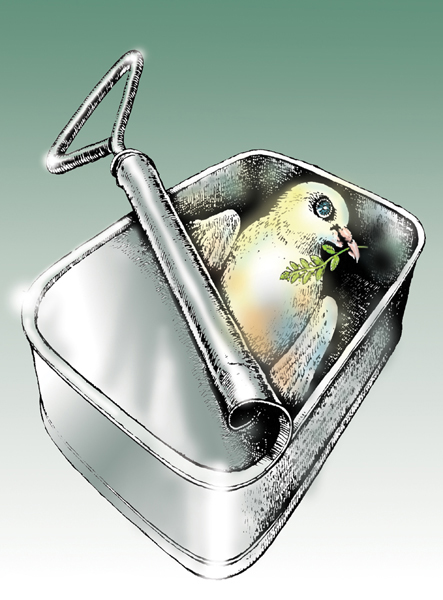
Cartoon by Ali Divandari

== Exhibitions ==
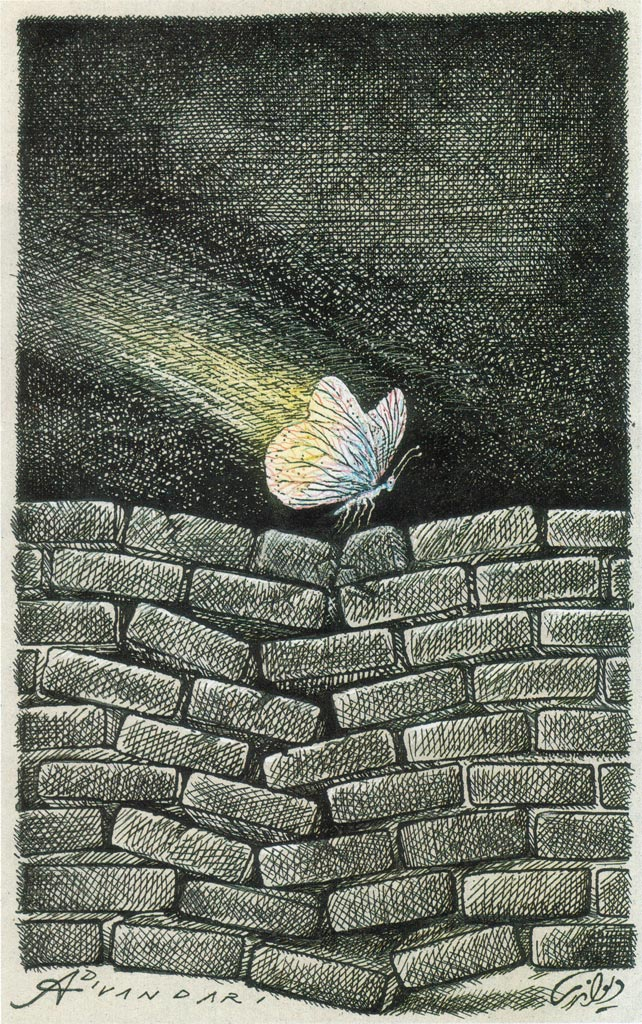
Cartoon by Ali Divandari

=== Solo exhibitions ===
- Kavir Gallery / Sabzevar-Iran / 1976
- Andisheh Gallery / Tehran-Iran / 21–30 Jan 1996 / 50 Works
- Abshar Art House / Sabzevar-Iran / Sep–Oct 2000 / 30 Works
- Seyhun Art Gallery / Tehran-Iran / 20–25 Apr 2002 / 30 Works
- Yasemi Gallery / Tabriz-Iran / 18–22 Oct 2002 / 40 Works
- Kolbe-ye-Javan Gallery / Ardebil-Iran / 10–18 Aug 2004 / 36 Works
- Isfahan Cartoon House / Isfahan-Iran / 29 Aug-9 Sep 2004 / 40 Works
- Sales Art Gallery / Tehran-Iran / 7–20 Jan 2005 / 28 Works
- Aban Art Gallery / Tehran-Iran / 22–27 Jan 2005 / 30 Works

About 300 Works in 9 Solo Exhibitions since 1976

=== Group exhibitions ===
- Afrand Art Gallery / Tehran-Iran / 26 Dec 1994 – 5 Jan 1995 / 8 Works
- Iran Art Gallery / Tehran-Iran / 25 Feb-6 Mar 1996 / 10 Works
- Seyhun Art Gallery / Tehran-Iran / 14–19 Jul 2007 / 12 Works

About 32 Works in 3 Group Exhibitions since 1995

== Publications ==
=== Book ===
Title: Smile Monalisa
Drawings & Cartoons by Ali Divandari
Rozane Publications
Graphic Designer: Jamal Rahmati
270 Pages – Grayscale
First Edition: 2001
ISBN 964-334-084-8

== Awards ==
Festival Title	Prize Title	Country	Year
Yomiuri Int'l Cartoon Contest	Honorable Mention	Japan	1992
The 3rd Okhotsk Int'l Cartoon Festival	Special Merit Work	Japan	1992
Xll Mostra Int'l del disegno Umoristico Sportivo Ancona	Special Prize	Italy	1993
25th World Cartoon Gallery Skopje '93	III Prize	Macedonia	1993
47th International Festival of the Humor of Bordighera	Special Prize	Italy	1994
4th Seoul Int'l Cartoon Festival	Honorable Mention	South Korea	1994
6th Olense Kartoenale, Dieren	Fourth Prize – De Lekkerbekpot	Belgium	1994
3rd Taejon Int'l Cartoon Contest	Fifth Prize	South Korea	1994
The 6th Okhotsk Int'l Cartoon Festival	Special Merit Work	Japan	1995
4th Taejon Int'l Cartoon Contest	Winning Prize	South Korea	1995
5th Seoul Int'l Cartoon Festival	Main theme winning	South Korea	1995
The 7th Okhotsk Int'l Cartoon Festival	Special Merit Work	Japan	1996
1st Aydın Doğan Int'l Cartoon Competition	Honorable Mention	Turkey	1996
6th Seoul Int'l Cartoon Festival	Open theme winning	South Korea	1996
19th Int'l Cartoon Exhibition, Beringen	Press Award	Belgium	1996
6th Taejon Int'l Cartoon Contest	Fifth Prize	South Korea	1997
Satyrykon Int'l Cartoon Exhibition	Award of the Director of the culture & sport department	Poland	1997
The 8th Okhotsk Int'l Cartoon Festival	Special Merit Work	Japan	1997
Int'l Golden Mouflon Cartoon Festival	Silver Mouflon Prize	Cyprus	1997
13th Int'l Cartoon Festival, Slavonski Brod	Special Award	Croatia	1997
7th Taejon Int'l Cartoon Contest	Fifth Prize	South Korea	1998
8th Int'l Cartoon Festival in Omiya	Most Popular work	Japan	1998
Courage World Cartoon Contest	Bronze Goad	Taiwan	1999
4eme Festival Int'l du dessin d'Humour et de Presse	Second Prize	France	1999
Int'l Cartoon Competition on the Occasion of EXPO 2000	Top Ten Work	Germany	2000
20th Int'l Nasreddin Hodja Cartoon Contest	Special Prize of the Association of Political Science School Graduates	Turkey	2000
Courage World Cartoon Contest	Prize of Importance	Taiwan	2000
1st Int'l Mediterranean Cartoon Competition	Special Prize of Alanya Head Official	Turkey	2001
29° Premio di Forte dei Marmi per la Satira Politica	Award for The Int'l Graphic Design	Italy	2001
2nd Int'l Caricature Contest, Independence	Second Award	Ukraine	2002
The 1st LM Int'l Cartoon Competition	Bronze Prize	China	2002
The 1st LM Int'l Cartoon Competition	Prizes for Excellence	China	2002
2nd Golagha Int'l Cartoon Competition	Worthy for appreciation	Iran	2003
The 2nd LM Int'l Cartoon Competition	Excellence Prize	China	2003
2nd Free Cartoons Web Int'l Cartoonet Festival	Bronze Prize	China	2004
The 3rd LM Int'l Cartoon Competition	Excellence Prize	China	2004
1st Red Man Int'l Cartoon Humour Competition	Selected Prize	China	2006
5th Free Cartoons Web Int'l Cartoonet Festival	Selected Prize	China	2006
7th Int'l Mediterranean Cartoon Competition	Third place	Turkey	2007
Master Cup Int'l Cartoon and Illustration Biennial	Selected Prize	China	2007
16th Daejeon Int'l Cartoon Contest	Honorable Mention	South Korea	2007
2nd Red Man Int'l Cartoon Humour Competition	Excellent Prize	China	2008
Zero Int'l Cartoon Exhibition Mussel & Fish	Honorable Mention	Bulgaria	2009
The First Int'l Cartoon Contest Quebec Banana	Prize of the Jury	Canada	2010
Sehr-i Istanbul International Cartoon Exhibition	Top Ten	Turkey	2013
International Cartoon Festival in Saitama: The Best Cartoons of Nippon	Most Popular work	Japan	2015
International Cartoon Contest Ymittos	Third Place	Greece	2016

== Panorama ==
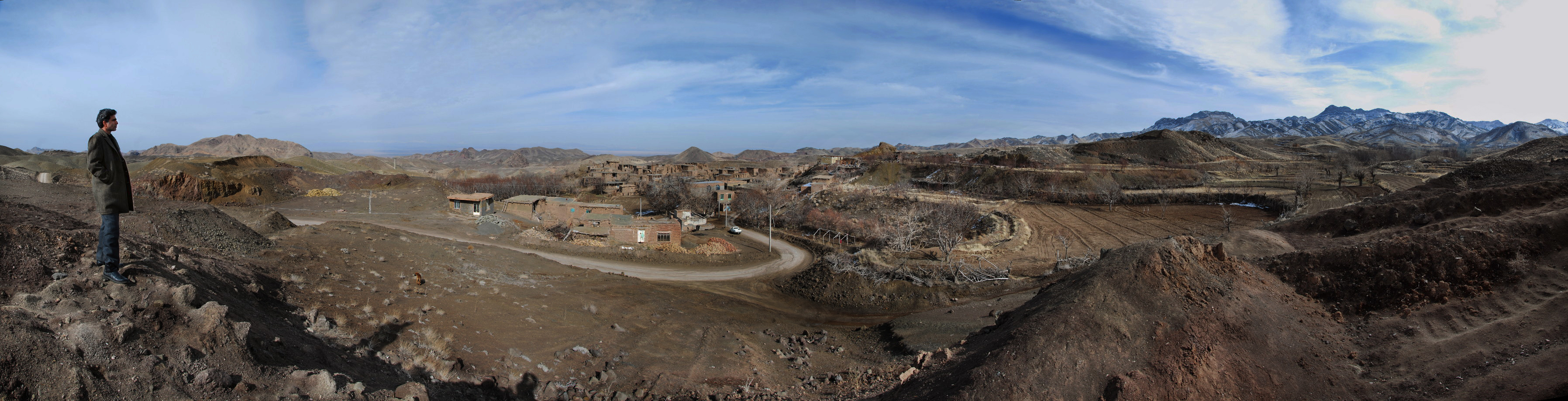
Ali Divandari in his ancestral village
