= 7/12 extract =

Land record in Maharashtra and Gujarat, India

The 7/12 extract is an extract from the land register maintained by the revenue department of the governments of Maharashtra and Gujarat, states in India. The extract gives information of the survey number of the land, the name of the owner of the land and its cultivator, the area of the land, the type of cultivation - whether irrigated or rain fed, the crops planted in the last cultivating season. It also records loans extended to the land owner given by government agencies, including the purpose - such as loans or subsidies for buying seeds, pesticides or fertilisers, for which the loan was given, the loans could be given to the owner or the cultivator. It is one of the documents that provides evidence of the ownership of the land it represents. In rural areas the ownership of a particular plot of land can be established on the basis of the 7/12 extract. It is called as "Record of Rights" or "Record of Land Rights"

== History ==
A 2009 news story informs that 2.11 crore extracts in all the 358 talukas of the state of Maharashtra have been digitised. This digitisation has been implemented as promoted by India's central government. In April 2012, online mutation to the extract has started in 3 centres in Pune a district in Maharashtra, these mutations will record changes subsequent to transfer of ownership. This system connectivity between the offices of the sub-register (Department of Registration and Stamps), the tehsildar (Revenue department) and the Land records department.

== Sources ==
The name originates from the Maharashtra Land Revenue Manual. The number seven and twelve of the extract denotes the Village Form numbers. The upper part of the extract denotes village Form: VII, which refers to record of rights, denoting the names of occupants, owners or mortgagees of the land or assignees of the rent or revenue, government lessees, tenants, the rights and liabilities of holders to pay revenue, other things which can be specified by the state government by making the rule and other details of the land, other than crop details. Whereas, the lower part of the extract, Form: XII refers to, register of crops, denoting the types of crop taken, figures of area under crops and fallow land.
