= Raoof Haghighi =

Iranian-born British artist (b. 1976)

- Born: December 1976 (age 49); Shiraz, Imperial State of Iran
- Known for: Painting
- Website: www.raoofhaghighi.com

Raoof Haghighi (Persian: رئوف حقیقی) is an Iranian-born British artist, known for his portraiture and realism.

He was born in 1976 in Shiraz, Iran. His father was an artist and it was in Iran where he started to learn painting; he is a self taught artist. Since 1995, he has had many group and solo art exhibitions internationally, including in Iran, the United Kingdom, United States, Czech Republic, Spain, and Ireland.

In April 2023, Raoof showcased his ‘surreal and hyperrealistic’ portraits and drawings at a London exhibit which he dedicated to ‘all the brave women’ in Iran fighting for their freedom.

== Awards ==
- 2011, 2015, 2017 – BP Portrait Award, National Portrait Gallery, London, England
- 2017 – Winner of the Gold Memorial Bowl award for best miniature work in the exhibition at the Royal Society of Miniature Painters, Sculptors and Gravers, London, England
- 2016 – Overall winner of Jackson's competition 'Drawn in competition', Jackson Art Supplies, London, England
- 2014 – Sky Arts Portrait Artist of the Year 2014 London Heat winner
- 2011 – Overall winner – Artist of the Year 2011 – Artists & Illustrators magazine

== Exhibitions ==
- Prague City Gallery – The Stone Bell House The Reunion of Poetry and Philosophy 3 March – 4 April 2018
- BP Portrait Award 2017 – The National Portrait Gallery, London – 22 June – 24 September 2017
- Royal Society of Miniature Painters. 20 September – 1 October 2017 at Mall Galleries, London.
- BP Portrait Award 2015 – June–September 2015 – National Portrait Gallery, London
- BP Portrait Award 2011 National Portrait Gallery, London – Wolverhampton Art Gallery
