= Mojtaba Heidarpanah =

Iranian illustrator (born 1990)

- مجتبی حیدرپناه
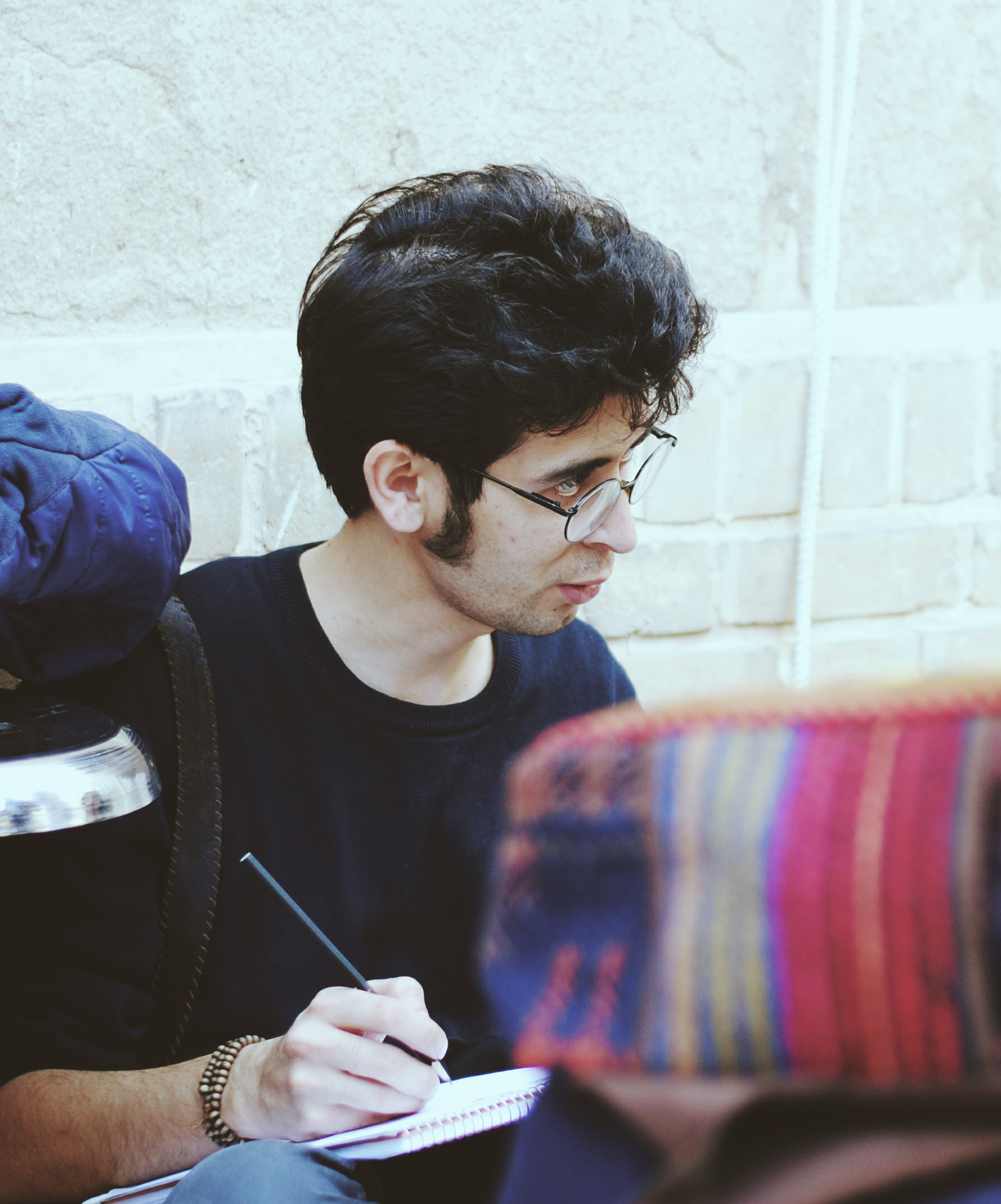
- Born: April 6, 1990 (age 36); Abadeh, Iran
- Education: Yazd University
- Style: cartoon; illustration; animation

Mojtaba Heidarpanah (Persian: مجتبی حیدرپناه; born 6 April 1990 in Abadeh) is an Iranian cartoonist, illustrator, painter, character designer and animator. Heidarpanah is best known for his series of cartoons called "Riot Police". From this collection, the work "The Thinker" won the third place in the 37th Aydin Dogan Cartoon Competition.

Mojtaba's digital artwork "Bending Streetlight" has been used as a meme among internet users since 2019.

== Early life ==
Mojtaba, was born in Abadeh city, the sixth child of Gholam Hossein Heidarpanah, known as Hossein the woodcarver, one of the woodcarving masters of Abadeh. In his childhood, he got acquainted with cartoons by reading the Golagha weekly newspaper and started drawing on his own, and received his first cartoon award in 2007 from Fars Provincial Cartoon Festival of (Bread and Art). Heidarpanah studied painting at the Faculty of Fine Arts at Yazd University.

== Career ==
He began his career as a cartoonist in 2008, uploading pieces online so that other Persian artists could provide feedback and help him to improve. In 2010, he won the main award at the International Cartoon Festival in Iran with the main theme of "effort".

In a decade of his activity, he has been able to win cartoon festival awards in Iran, Argentina, Italy, Brazil, Slovakia, Brazil Serbia and Turkey.

He has stated that he enjoys "the power of conveying the meaning to the audience in order to make them think within a single frame and sometimes shock them... Cartoon is my communicative device which lets me talk to the people of the world without knowing their languages."

Mojtaba has been working as freelance cartoonist and Illustrator for many important magazines and newspapers and publishers in Iran like Ghanoon newspaper, Jame Jam news paper, Farhikhtegan newspaper

== "Bending Streetlight" ==
Mojtaba posted his digital artwork "Bending Streetlight" to Instagram in 2019. The cartoon depicts a streetlight above two people on a bench, with the light from it bending away from one figure (who holds a smartphone) to illuminate the other (who reads a book).

The image quickly gained widespread attention and became an internet sensation. The meme's unique visual humor resonated with many, leading to its rapid spread across various meme creation and sharing websites. As a result, the bending streetlight became a symbol of unexpected reactions and surreal humor, solidifying its place in internet culture.

== Recognition ==
- Special diploma on the Int'l Cartoon Festival of Jiaxing, China (2010)
- First Prize on the First Int'l Cartoon Festival of North Khorasan, Iran (2010)
- Third Prize on the 11th Int'l Cartoon Competition in SOKOBANJA, Serbia (2012)
- Special Prize on the 45th Int'l Cartoon Competition in Umoristi a Marostica, Italy (2013).
- Special Diploma on the 6th International Cartoon Contest UrziceiI, Romania (2013).
- Special Prize on the 30th Int'l Cartoon Competition in Aydin Dogan, Turkey (2013)
- Second Prize on the 20th International Visual Arts Festival for Young Artists. IRAN (2013)
- First Prize on the 2nd International Contest of Social Illustrations, Argentina (2013).
- Second Prize on the 31st Int'l Cartoon Competition in Aydin Dogan (2014)
- Special Prize on 8th International Cartoon Contest, Mexico (2016)
- Special Prize of the 8th "La Ciudad de las"International cartoon festival/ (2016)
- Special Prize Of "ACCES" Association of the HumoDeva (2015)
- Special Prize International Competition Brain Sneezing Slovakia (2016)
- Special Prize of XXIV International Festival of Satire and Humor (2016)
- Finalists Of The International Cartoon Kid Contest/Italy (2016)
- Third Prize International Cartoon Festival Olense Kartoenale Belgium (2016)
- Special Prize of the 43rd International Festival of Caricature and Cartoon Piracicaba (2016)
- Golden prize of the 41st International Cartoon Festival LIE Championship /Italy (2017)
- Honorable Mention Award of Equal Rights and Gender Equality International Cartoon Contest 2019-2020
- Second Prize at the 28th International Satire and Humor Festival City of Trento in Italy 2020
- Second prize at the 5th International Cartoon Contest Animalcartoon in Serbia. 2020
