= Mahboubeh Honarian =

Iranian-Canadian Film Director

Mahboubeh Honarian محبوبه هنریان
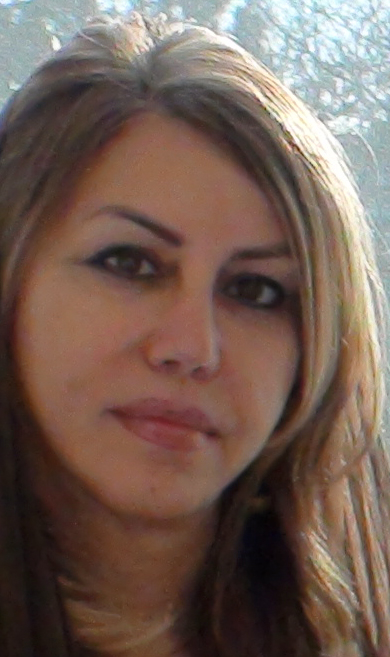
- Born: Isfahan, Iran
- Education: Nottingham Trent University - United Kingdom
- Occupations: Film Producer and Director
- Years active: 1993–present
- Website: www.veramedia.com

Mahboubeh Honarian (Persian: محبوبه هنریان; born in 1962) is an Iranian-Canadian film director and film producer. She was awarded her MSc in engineering multimedia and BA in Humanities with a media and cultural studies bias in the United Kingdom.

She has been working as a film producer and director on a broad range of documentary, feature film and short film films as well as TV series mainly focused on social issues such as war, homelessness, drug addiction, child abuse and refugees. The main concerns of her films are emphasized on women, children and youth.

Honarian has been invited to serve on the jury of a number of film festivals, including the International Emmy Awards in New York from 2010 to 2017, ‘the Academy of Canadian Cinema & Television (ACCT), Canada, 2016/2017, the Documentary Voices, Pulling Focus festival in Dubai in 2008, and the Great 11th Festival of Iranian Cinema in Iran in 2007.

She was invited as a guest filmmaker to various festivals including the World Congress of Science & Factual Producers in Germany in 2010, the Hot Docs Canadian International Documentary Festival as a member of a discussion panel at Spotlight on Iran in Canada in 2008 and at the GZ DOC film festival on International Producer's Day in China in 2008, 2012 and 2013.

She has been a member of Program Supervisory Board for the Conference of Visual Representations of Iran, University of St-Andrews, Scotland, in 2008 and a member of Scientific Board for the First Symposium on Visual Anthropology of Iran, Anthropology Society of Iran, University of Tehran in 2007.

Honarian has been the president of the Iranian Documentary Filmmakers Association for four years (2004–2008) and as an Information/Documentation officer for the United Nations Development Programme after the disastrous 2003 Bam earthquake.

== Filmography ==
- Producer of 'Sami', a Fiction film related to War Mines, 78 minutes, 2019
- 'Life Comes Back To Me', a documentary about the Syrian Refugee Children in camps, 33 minutes, 2019
- 'Unknown Beauty', 47 minutes, 2014
- 'CHINA', A co-produced documentary with CCTV's Documentary Channel (China Central Television) in collaboration with British Museum and V&A Museum, 2012
- 'Hidden In Dust' (Drug addicted people), 45 minutes, 2007
- 'The Bam That We All Want', (UNDP activities in Bam, Iran, after the Earthquake), 60 minutes, 2005
- 'This is not a Game', A Short film about three primary school girls researching on addiction of young people, 30 minutes, 2003
- 'The Bitter Awakening' (Homeless people), 30 minutes, 2002
- 'Playing With Life' (Runaway girls), 20 minutes, 2000

== TV Series ==
- 'Documentary From Another Perspective', TV Series (public's opinion towards the influence of a documentary film), (26 episodes, Documentary films with different subjects/issues), 2011-2013
- 'Hidden In Fog', TV Series (People and life in London), (5 parts), UK. 2007
- 'Physics In Iran', TV Series, Channel 4, (13 parts), Iran, 2006
- 'Our Tomorrow's Hopes' - TV Series (Teenagers), Channel 1, (72 Parts), Iran, 2004
- 'The Anxious Eyes', TV Series (Children Of Addiction), Channel 5, (13 parts), Iran, 2003
- 'Successful Women', TV Series, Jam-e Jam Channel, (10 parts), Iran, 2002
- 'Street Children', TV Series, Channel 4, (13 parts), Iran, 2001
- 'Children's Rights', TV Series, Channel 4, (3 parts), Iran, 2000
- 'Photokina 2000', TV Series, (5 parts), Germany, 2000
- 'Children, Film, Violence', TV Series, Channel 4, (7 parts), Iran, 2000

== Awards/Screenings ==
- Unknown Beauty, 47 minutes, 2014

- Best Directing, at the "Global Motion Picture Awards" Festival, 2018
- The Best Film Award at the "Breaking Down Barriers" Film Festival, section ‘Shattering Stereotypes’, Moscow, 2014
- At the ‘Noor' Film Festival,(USA)
- At the ‘Assim Vivemos’ Festival’ (Brazil)
- At the ‘Extraordinary’ film Festival (Belgium)
- At the "Cinema Verite (The Annual Iran International Documentary Film Festival), Iran, 2014
- Premiere at the "INTERdoc 2014", Serbia, 2014

- Hidden In Dust (drug addicted people), 45 minutes, 2007

- Screened and presented at the Bangkok Harm Reduction film festival, Thailand, 2009
- Screened and presented at the 4th annual In the Mind's Eye film festival, Canada, 2008
- Screened and presented at the Documentary Voices, Pulling Focus film festival, Dubai, 2008

- Playing With Life (runaway girls), 20 minutes, 2000

- Screened and presented at the Dortmund/Cologne International Women's film festival, Germany, 2006
- Nominated as one of the best films in the Iranian Cinema film festival, Iran, 2000
- Nominated and Screened at the Kish Documentary film festival, Iran, 2000

== Juror ==
- The "International Emmy Awards" for the 'Documentary' Category, Academy of Television Arts & Sciences, New York, 2010-2014
- "Academy of Canadian Cinema & Television", (ACCT), Canada, 2016/2017,
- "Documentary Voices Festival", Pulling Focus, bringing together documentary filmmakers from three different cultures of Arab, American and Iranian. Documentary Voices, Dubai, UAE. 2008
- "Jam Film Festival", Iran, 2008
- "The Great 11th Festival of Iranian Cinema", Iran, 2007
- "Varesh Film Festival", Iran, 2003

== Membership ==
Honarian is also a member of the following organizations:

- Academy of Canadian Cinema & Television’ (ACCT), Canada, since 2016
- International Academy of Television Arts & Sciences’(Emmy), USA, 2015
- A member of the Women in Film and Television – Toronto, WIFT, Canada, 2018
- A member of the World Congress of Science and Factual Producers WCSFP, Germany, 2010
- A member of the Iranian Documentary Filmmakers Association IRDFA Iran, 2000–Present
- A member of the European Documentary Network, EDN, Denmark, 2008–Present
- A member of the Documentary Organization of Canada, DOC Canada, 2008–Present

== Sources ==
- World Congress of Science and Factual Producers WCSFP
- HotDocs Film Festival, Canada: HotDocs
- European Documentary Network: EDN
- FilmFestival.com Fest21
- DOKweb Institute of Documentary Film
- Documentary Voices Film Festival, Dubai: Documentary Voices
- University of St Andrews, Scotland: St Andrews
- Breaking Down Barriers: KinoFest Film Festival, Russia
