= Sadegh Tirafkan =

Iranian contemporary artist

- صادق تیرافکن
- Born: July 3, 1965
- Died: May 9, 2013 (aged 47)
- Education: University of Tehran
- Known for: Photography, film, video installation, and collage

Sadegh Tirafkan (July 3, 1965 in Karbala, Iraq to Iranian parents – May 9, 2013 in Toronto, Ontario, Canada; Persian: صادق تیرافکن) was an Iranian contemporary artist who lived mainly in Tehran, Iran.

== Career ==
Tirafkan employed different media in his work: photography, video installation, and collage. He graduated from Tehran University with a degree in Photography in 1989 and participated in solo and group exhibitions worldwide.

Tirafkan's work included "Manhood", which dealt with the perception of masculinity in Persian culture. Other projects such as "Persepolis", "Ashoura", "Secret of Words", "Iranian Man", "Whispers of the East", "The Loss of Our Identity", "Multitude" and "Devotion" dealt with Iranian history, identity, sociopolitical, religious and gender issues.

His works are in the collections of several museums including the Tehran Museum of Contemporary Art, British Museum, Brooklyn Museum and the Los Angeles County Museum of Art.

== Group exhibition ==
- 1986 Ketabe Azad Gallery, Tehran, Iran.

== Personal exhibitions ==
- 1989 Mansoureh Hossini Gallery, Tehran Iran
- 1991 Seyhoun Art Gallery, Tehran, Iran
- 1995 Seyhoun Art Gallery, Tehran, Iran
- 1997 Seyhoun Art Gallery, Tehran, Iran
- 2000 Seyhoun Art Gallery, Tehran, Iran
- 2001 Seyhoun Art Gallery, Tehran, Iran
- 2002 Massoud Nader Gallery, New York City, United States
- 2002 Parkerson Gallery, Houston, United States
- 2003 VU Gallery, Paris, France
- 2004 Lehmann maupin Gallery, New York City, United States
- 2005 Assar Art gallery, Tehran, Iran
- 2005 Espace photography Contreype, Brussels, Belgium
- 2005 VU Photography Centre, Quebec City, Canada
- 2006 Aspace Gallery, Toronto, Canada
- 2006 Lee Ka-Sing gallery, Toronto, Canada
- 2006 Massoud Nader Gallery, New York City, United States
- 2007 Silk Road Gallery, Tehran, Iran
- 2008 Assar Art gallery, Tehran, Iran
- 2010 Selma Feriani + Louise Alexander Gallery, London, UK

== Works ==
- 1997 Persopolis, Video installation
- 2000 The Children of Dark city, Installation & video, Painting, Sculpture
- 2000 Iranian Man, Photographic series
- 2001 Ashura, Installation pictures, video & painting
- 2002 Secret of Words, Photographic series
- 2002 Stages, Photo, Video installation
- 2003 Sacrifice, Photographic series
- 2005 Lighting The Nation Gate, Photo, Video installation
- 2006-7 Whispers of the East, Photographic series
- 2009-2010 Human Tapestry, Photographic series

== Public collection ==
- 2001, Museum of Contemporary Art, Tehran, Iran
- 2003, Maison européenne de la photographie, Paris, France
- 2007, British Museum, London, UK
- 2008, Brooklyn Museum, New York City, United States
- 2008, Los Angeles County Museum of Art, Los Angeles, United States

== See also ==
- Culture of Iran
- Islamic art
- Iranian art
- Iranian art and architecture
- List of Iranian artists

== See also ==
- Iranian cinema
- Iranian modern and contemporary art
