= Mohammad Ali Taraghijah =

Iranian painter (1943–2010)

- محمدعلی ترقی‌جاه
- Born: 1943; Tehran, Imperial State of Iran
- Died: 12 August 2010 (aged 66–67); Tehran, Iran
- Occupations: Painter, Artist
- Spouse: Firoozeh Navabi
- Children: Mohammad Taraghijah; Ali Taraghijah
- Website: http://www.taraghijah.com

Mohammad-Ali Taraghijah (Persian: محمدعلی ترقی‌جاه; 1943 – 12 August 2010) was an Iranian painter, whose work often featured rural, Iranian, landscape imagery.

== Biography ==
Born 1943 in Tehran, Iran. He graduated from the College of Science & Technology with a degree in Mechanical Engineering, yet his heart was set on creating art. He participated in the Iran National Art Competition in 1968 and he won the Golden Award that year. In 1970 he returned to Tehran and decided to take up painting professionally.

In 1994, the Tehran Museum of Contemporary Art selected some of his works for the museum collection and printed a collection of these works. In 1998, UNICEF selected two of his paintings for their Christmas cards.

His works have been exhibited in Switzerland, Germany, Italy, France, United States and Japan. His paintings were selected by the International Museum of 20th Century Arts to present Iran's art.

His elder son, Mohammad Taraghijah, is an architect, and his younger son, Ali Taraghijah, is also a painter.

== Exhibitions ==
- 2010, 2009, 2008, 2007, 2006, 2005, 2004, 2003, 2002, 2001, 2000, 1999, 1998, 1996 Galerie Arcade Chausse-Coqs, Genève, Switzerland.
- 2009 Christie's Auction, Dubai, UEA (International Modern and Contemporary Art)
- 2009 The First Fadjr International Visual Arts Festival.
- 2008 Christie's Auction, Dubai, UEA (International Modern and Contemporary Art)
- 2008 Bonhams auction Royal Mirage Hotel Dubai (Modern and Contemporary Arab, Iranian, Indian, and Pakistani Art)
- 2008 The 7th National Biennial of Iranian Contemporary Painting Saba cultural Center
- 2007 Christie's Auction, Dubai, UEA (International Modern and Contemporary Art)
- 2007 The First Iranian Biennial of Printmaking, Tehran Museum of Contemporary Art
- 2007 Persian spring's exhibition Tehran Museum of Contemporary Art.
- 2006-2004-2002-2000 the International Painting Biennial of the Islamic World (Tehran Museum of Contemporary Art)
- 2006 International visual Arts Festival of Resistance, Tehran Museum of Contemporary Art
- 2006 Gallery Artefiz, Zurich, Switzerland
- 2006 Beijing International Art Expo 2006, China
- 2005 Museu da Agua, Lisbon Portugal + Palácio da Bolsa Porto Portugal
- 2005 X-Cathédrale Sacré Coeur, Casablanca, Morocco
- 2005 Modern Art Movement, Tehran Museum of Contemporary Art
- 2004 Capua, Chiosto di San Domenico, Italy.
- 2004 Villa Dutoite, Genève, Switzerland.
- 2003 Museum of Art & Science, Daytona Beach, Florida, U.S.
- 2003 Al Bidda Gallery, Doha, Qatar.
- 2003 Art Museum of Southeast Texas, U.S.
- 2003 Spiritual Vision Exhibition, Tehran Museum of Contemporary Art
- 2003, 2000, 1997, 1995, 1993, 1991 Iranian Painting Biennial, Tehran Museum of Contemporary Art
- 2002 Los Angeles (Central) Public Library, U.S.
- 2002 Christie's, London, U.K.
- 2001 Meredian International Center, Washington D.C., U.S.
- 2001 Sharjeh Art Biennial, U.A.E.
- 2001 Queens Library Gallery, New York, U.S.
- 2001 United Nation, Genève, Switzerland
- 2001 Barbican Art Galleries, London, U.K.
- 2001 Galerie Amber, Leiden, Netherlands
- 2000 Gallery Azteca, Madrid, Spain
- 2000 The International Contemporary Arts Center, Riyadh, Saudi Arabia
- 2000 Symbolic Expression in Iranian Modernist Painting, Tehran Museum of Contemporary Art
- 2000 Art Expo New York, New York, U.S.
- 2000 International Trade Center, Washington DC.
- 2000 1st. Drawing Biennial, Tehran Museum of Contemporary Art
- 1999 Islamic Cultural Centre, London, U.K.
- 1998 Art Triennal of India, Delhi, India
- 1998 Expo 98 Lisbon, Portugal
- 1997 China Art Expo 97, Beijing, China
- 1997 Maison de l'Iran, Paris, France
- 1997, 1993, 1990 Rathaus Pavillon Pforzheim, Germany
- 1996 Feria Internacional de Arte, Mexico City, Mexico
- 1995 27e Festival International de Peinture, Canges-sur-Mer, France
- 1995 Galerie Reindle, Innsbruck, Austria
- 1994 Fortezza de Basso, Florance, Italy
- 1994, 1988 Galerie Galeothek, Innsbruck, Austria
- 1993, 1991 Gallery Seyhoon, Tehran, Iran
- 1992 Galerie Art & Decor, Wien, Austria
- 1992, 1989, 1988, 1986, 1986 Tehran Museum of Contemporary Art, Iran
- 1991, 1989 Galerie im Ried, Zürich, Switzerland
- 1988 Galerie Modus-Vivendi, Zürich, Switzerland
- 1988 Gallery Taichi, Tokyo, Japan
- 1986 Galerie 8, Yverdon, Switzerland
- 1986 Galerie d'Art du vieux Montreux, Switzerland
- 1986, 1984 Galerie 8, Yverdon, Switzerland
- 1985 Corsh Gallery, Chicago, U.S.
- 1985 Galerie Milton, Yverdon, Switzerland
- 1983 Solo show Tehran Museum of Contemporary Art
- 1984 Galerie Shaller, Stuttgart, Germany
- 1983 2nd Asian Art Bienniale, Bangladesh
- 1983 Galerie Migros, St.-Croix, Switzerland
- 1978 Art 9'78, The International Art Fair Basel, Basel, Switzerland
- 1976 Tehran Gallery, Tehran, Iran
- 1974 First Tehran International Art Expo Iran
- 1967 Winner of the gold medal in the Art Competition of the Universities in Iran

== See also ==
- Islamic art
- Iranian art
- Islamic calligraphy
- List of Iranian artists
