= Amir Sheikhvand =

Iranian-Canadian jewelry artist

- Born: Tehran, Iran
- Style: Jewelry Art
- Website: amirsheikhvand.com

Amir Sheikhvand is an Iranian-Canadian jewelry artist based in Toronto, Canada.

== Early life and education ==
Sheikhvand was born and raised in Tehran, Iran. He graduated from Tehran’s Gold Institute in 1994 with a bachelors degree in science. He has a Graduate Gemologist (GG) in jewellery from Gemological Institute of America (GIA).

== Work ==
Sheikhvand trained in biology and graphic design before becoming a jewelry designer. He uses traditional Iranian techniques including Malileh-kary (filigree work) and Minakary (miniature enameling).

Sheikhvand staged solo exhibition in various Iranian galleries before moving to Canada in 1999. His work has been exhibited in both juried and invitational exhibitions at McMaster Museum of Art, and other Canadian museums and galleries. He is represented by Gallery Noel Guyomarc’h in Montreal, Alternatives in Rome and Charon Kransen Arts in New York.

Sheikhvand is a member of Ontario Crafts Council Board of Directors and Society of North American Goldsmiths.

== Awards ==
- 2019 - AGTA Spectrum™ Awards
