= 127 (band) =

- Origin: Tehran, Iran
- Genres: Gypsy punk, jazz, rock
- Members: Sohrab Mohebbi (guitar/vocals); Sardar Sarmast (piano); Salmak Khaledi (trombone); Alireza Pourassad (bass); Yayha Alkhansa (drums); Shervin Shahamipour (backing vocals, setar)
- Website: www.127band.com

127 (Persian: ١٢٧) is an Iranian five-piece band – guitar, piano, trombone, bass and drums – with roots in Iranian melodies and jazz with an alternative sound.

Members include Sohrab Mohebbi (guitar/vocals), Sardar Sarmast (piano), Salmak Khaledi (trombone), Alireza Pourassad (bass), Yayha Alkhansa (drums) and Shervin Shahamipour (back vocals, setar).

== Discography ==
- Coming around (2005)
- The Full time job (2006)
- Khal Punk (2008)
- Pop Emergency (2011)
- Be Raahe Khod (2019)
