= Gohar Dashti =

Iranian photographer and video artist

- Born: 1980 (age 45–46); Ahvaz, Iran
- Education: University of Tehran
- Known for: Photographer
- Website: Official website

Gohar Dashti (born 1980 in Ahvaz, Iran) is an Iranian photographer and video artist who lives and works in Tehran. The dominant theme in her work is her native country, its topography and history of violence.

Her work has traveled internationally and she has had many solo exhibitions. She studied photography at the University of Tehran and graduated with an M.A. in 2005. During her studies and throughout her life, she noticed the impact the Iran–Iraq War had on her country. Dashti's earlier work looks at the lasting effects of the war on the people and the land. In this way, she is considered to be a conflict photographer, but her work contrasts with the stark photojournalism that often is produced to represent the effect that war has on a country and its people. In 2017, her practice shifted slightly. Dashti began investigating the natural world. Though the subject matter differs from her earlier work, her practice at its core is still rooted in her country, its culture and her experiences within these.

== Early life ==
Born in 1980 in Iran, Dashti grew up in Ahvaz, close to the Iran-Iraq border. Despite the Iran-Iraq War, Dashti's family decided to stay. There were many times that she and her family would go up on the roof when there was a pause in the fighting to collect spent bullets and were at constant risk of bombings. Her experiences in her childhood and her culture have heavily influenced the work she creates as an artist.

== Photography works ==
=== Today's Life and War (2008) ===
Dashti's earlier and most well-known work is Today's Life and War which was featured in multiple exhibitions such as She Who Tells a Story: Women Photographers from Iran and the Arab World and Subtehran: Subjective Truth from Iran. In this work, Dashti is providing a new perspective on the Iran-Iraq War from the point of view of an Iranian woman and how civilians lives were affected by the war. The photographs don't only look at the violence and because of this, they defy the mainstream mass of images that depict Iran as a war-torn country. Often Dashti's work is seen as a new type of documentary style, one that breaks the norms and provides a story that the viewer can empathize with.

This work includes highly stylized staged settings that present a couple, a man and a woman, who are performing daily tasks or celebration but they are positioned amongst the detritus of war. In one image, the couple is seated in a rusted, broken-down car, donning their wedding attire, with the lights of military vehicles in the background. This signifies how individuals are forced to put their life on pause in times of war. Dashti explains that this work shows how war "permeates all aspects of contemporary society,". Blurring the line between fiction and reality she pulls these scenes from stories of Iran and her own experiences. Though the surrealist qualities in the work may first present the viewer with a whimsical scene, it is quickly influenced by the struggle and determination in the work which in turn rationalizes the images. The themes of borders and boundaries are evident in this work and stem from her life in Ahvaz since it is a border community and she was forced to be close to the conflict, being subjected to bombings almost daily. Dashti examines the impacts that war has on people's lives including the emotional labor and psychological burdens that are caused. This work allows an alternative perspective to that of mainstream photojournalism of Iran, and Dashti intends the images to be relatable and from an influential perspective that reaches individuals who haven't experienced this type of adversity.

=== Iran, Untitled (2013) and Stateless (2014) ===
Like her previous work, this photography is also situated within conversations of how war affects people and broadens her scope to larger populations and how the war affected Iran as a whole. Though shot at separate times, they deal with similar concepts. The photographs are staged and Dashti makes no effort to hide this with the use of surrealist tendencies in the work or the use of props, including a mattress, a slide, or a bathtub in desert landscapes. The contradictions between action and pause reflect the modern society Dashti inhabits, and how society in Iran has not found a balance. With this sense of action also comes ideas of location, Dashti is making it evident that the desert represented in these images is not an empty space and neither is the country of Iran.

==== Home (2017) ====
This series looks at how nature enters the abandoned homes of Iran, both symbolically and physically. Dashti is commenting on the relationship between nature and humans and how they intersect within lived spaces. The spaces depicted in these digital photographs were once inhabited by citizens who left the country and all evidence of the lives they once lived there are buried. The images depict the taking over of the structures by the plants, and like most of her other work, they are staged. Dashti wants the viewer to consider how humans interact with nature and acknowledge the strength it has. Through her observations of the land that had been emptied by the war in Iran, she wanted to highlight the tenacity of nature after witnessing a fern growing up from the cracks of one of these homes. Dashti commented saying, "It had the power to stay there. Left alone, it would eventually consume and conquer their home." The work combines "the personal, the political and the botanical" and shows how people can come and go, but the land that humans inhabit will always be there, evolving as humans interact with it in various ways.

In creating this work, it made her wonder why her parents had chosen not to flee Iran during the war. Upon asking her father, his response was a concern of protecting his loved ones. He had wanted the family to stick together and because of this, families like hers who stayed were able to help restore the community after the war ended. This series reflects the histories of Iranian families during the time of the war and its physical impacts.

==== Still Life (2017) ====
Dashti used cameraless photography techniques such as cyanotypes and photograms to create plant imagery in this work. Unlike most of her work, she moves heavily into abstraction in Still Life and closes in on her organic subject matter. By composing the plants often in disarray, she wants the viewer to be intrigued by the imagery and notice their strangeness because of the fact the plants are decontextualized. Due to the tight framing, the viewer can examine the ways in which Dashti has manipulated the subject matter. The images highlight the textures of the plant material and reveal their repetitive nature and patternings. Often smashing and breaking the material before photographing it, Dashti comments on the beauty of the natural world while also acknowledging the damaging effects humans can have on it. Even though the original images are made in a way that is very hands-on, she alters the prints further by enlarging them and reproducing them digitally which adds to the mechanical and organic relationship in the work.

==== Alien (2017) ====
Taking a slightly different turn from previous work, Dashti utilized an instant camera to produce work depicting the forests of New Hampshire. Unlike most landscape photography, this work embraces the imperfections of the medium. They are small in size with an offset border, referencing the Polaroid format. By placing a glass plate in every image, the flash of Dashti's camera is recorded. By adding in this element, Dashti places herself and the viewer in a distanced position from the subject matter and produces a voyeuristic effect. In doing this, she also makes it evident that she is a visitor in the setting. For the first time the landscape of Iran is removed from her subject matter and she is separate from her homeland. The naturally lit spaces oppose the artificial flash in every scene, perhaps signifying the displaced feeling that Dashti has in being in a foreign place. The combination of the light, subject matter, and medium create an uncommon quality to the images and Dashti intends for the photographs to place the viewer into a state of instability.
