= Ramin, Rokni, Hesam =

UAE-based artist collective from Iran

- Notable work: Forgive me distant wars for bringing flower home, Her Majesty?, Ramin Haerizadeh Rokni Haerizadeh Hesam Rahmanian
- Awards: Prix Pébéo, 2024; Black Mountain College Prize, 2022; OGR Torino Prize, 2017; 2nd Han Nefkens Foundation-MACBA Award, 2016

Ramin, Rokni, Hesam are Abu Dhabi-based artist collective from Iran, consisting of Ramin Haerizadeh (1975, Tehran), Rokni Haerizadeh (1978, Tehran), and Hesam Rahmanian (1980, Knoxville) who's working and living together described as a project, since 2009.

== History ==
The three artists met in underground drawing and painting classes in the early 90s, while Iran was recovering from an eight-year war (Iran-Iraq: 1980–1988). These classes were formed as a result of the Iranian Cultural Revolution that lead many students, educators and lecturers to take their classes inside their private homes.

Ramin Haerizadeh, Rokni Haerizadeh and Hesam Rahmanian's early collaborative practice formed as early as 1997 in Tehran, and the artists reside (in exile) in the UAE since 2009. Their home is a spectrum of a studio, a library, film set, research center, a museum and sketchbook for their upcoming project.

== Work ==
The artists work individually and collectively and often incorporate friends and people from different walks of life into their practice. The trio's work is often referred to as a landscape where the complex nature of processing is integrated in the nested system that forms the landscape of their practice.

Generosity is in the core of their practice. They have practiced a model of how to collaborate, creating a self-sustaining creative life; how to build an aesthetic and undermine it; how to be politically acute and humorous, generous and eccentric. In the trios art making, production is performance. And the performance is a collective action leading to dance, art, and politics. According to Laura Marks, "preferring the intimacy of a few to the cruel judgments of a social order, they create a flourishing private utopia that turns abjection inside out, to release a seemingly endless supply of pleasure and invention. Living well is the best revenge."

The collective has done projects with OGR Torino as collateral events of the 59th Venice Biennale (2022), NYU Abu Dhabi Art Gallery (2022), Schirn Kunsthalle, Frankfurt (2020), Frye Art Museum, Seattle (2019), Officine Grandi Riparazioni (OGR), Turin (2018), MACBA, Barcelona (2017), Institute of Contemporary Art (ICA), Boston (2015), Kunsthalle Zurich (2015) and Den Frie Udstilling, Copenhagen (2015).

Slice a Slanted Arch Into Dry Paper Sky, Kunsthalle Zürich, 2015

Details, Slice a Slanted Arch Into Dry Paper Sky, Kunsthalle Zürich, 2015

Slice a slanted Arch into Dry paper Sky, Ramin Haerizadeh, Rokni Haerizadeh and Hesam Rahmanian, 2015, Kunsthalle Zurich

Slice a Slanted Arch Into Dry Paper Sky, Detail of Floor Painting, 11x12 Meter, 2015, Kunsthalle Zurich

The collective is also notable for receiving the Black Mountain College Prize, 2022, and Han Nefkens Foundation/MACBA Award (2016). The trio has additionally been a part of group exhibitions including A Century of the Artist's Studio: 1920–2020, Whitechapel Gallery, London, UK, Biennale of Sydney where they had a large installation I Prefer Talking to Doctors About Something Else at The Powerhouse Museum (2020), the Louisiana Museum of Modern Art in Denmark for Homeless Souls (2019) for which they won the 6th Global Fine Art Award in Global Humanity category, The inaugural Toronto Biennial of Art 2019, and a multi-room installation for The Creative Act in Guggenheim Abu Dhabi (2017), as well as other exhibitions at three different locations for 9th Liverpool Biennial (2016). In 2015, the collective had the installation at Queensland Gallery for 8th Asia Pacific Triennial of Contemporary Art.

== Selected Solo Exhibitions ==
- Le Diwan de Démon, CCC OD - Centre de Création Contemporaine Olivier Debré, Tours, France, 2 June 2023- 18 February 2024.
- The Beautiful Decay of Flowers in The Vase, Galerie Insitu Fabienne Leclerc, Paris, France, 14 May 2023- 28 July 2023.
- Atlas of the World, Laurel Parker Book, Paris, France, 14 May 2023- 28 July 2023.
- Alluvium, OGR - Officine Grandi Riparazioni at Venice, Venice, Italy, 22 April- 27 November 2022.
- Parthenogenesis, NYU Abu Dhabi Art Gallery (NYUAD), Abu Dhabi, 2022. 1 March - June 12, 2022.
- From March to April... & From Sea to Dawn, ajh, Bielefeld, Germany (2021). 15 April until 14 July 2021.
- Either he’s dead or my watch has stopped: Groucho Marx (while getting the patient’s pulse), Schirn Kunsthalle, Frankfurt, Germany (2020). 3 September until 13 December 2020.
- We Are Open For Installation, Gallery Isabelle van den Eynde, Dubai, UAE (2019). May 15 – November 9, 2019.
- The Rain Doesn’t Know Friends From Foes, Frye Museum, Seattle, USA (2019). JANUARY 26 – APRIL 28, 2019.
- Night of Another Spring (Part 1 & 2), Galerie Insitu Fabienne Leclerc, Paris, France (2018). 10. September - 17 November 2018.
- Forgive me, distant wars, for bringing flowers home, OGR - Officine Grandi Riparazioni, Turin, Italy (2018). 12 Jul 18 - 30 Sep 18.
- From Sea to Dawn, Galerie Krinzinger, Vienna, Austria (2018). 30.Jan.2018-10.March.2018.
- The Maids, MACBA, Barcelona, Spain (2017). October 28, 2017 to January 7, 2018.
- The Birthday Party, Institute of Contemporary Art (ICA), Boston, USA (2015). Dec 16, 2015 – Mar 27, 2016.
The Birthday Party, ICA Boston, 2015

The Birthday Party, ICA Boston, 2015

The Birthday Party, ICA Boston, 2015, Photo by Maziaar Sadr

Production-performance of The Birthday Party by Ramin, Rokni, Hesam, ICA BOSTON, 2015, Photo by Maziaar Sadr
- Those Who Love Spiders, and Let Them Sleep in Their Hair, Den Frie Centre of Contemporary Art, Copenhagen, Denmark (2015). November 7, 2015 – February 28, 2016.
- I won't wait for grey hairs and worldly cares to soften my views, Callicoon Fine Arts, New York, USA (2015). April 12 – June 7, 2015.
- Slice a Slanted Arc Into Dry Paper Sky, Kunsthalle, Zurich, Switzerland (2015). Feb 21 2015 - May 17, 2015.
- The Exquisite Corpse Shall Drink the New Wine, Gallery Isabelle van den Eynde, UAE (2014). 18.March.2014-18.May.2014.
- I Put it There You Name It, Gallery Isabelle van den Eynde, UAE (2012). 05.March.2012-17.May.2012.

== Selected Group Exhibitions ==
- Exils – Regards D’artistes, Louvre, Lens, France 2024
- Forms of The Shadow, Secession, Vienna, Austria 2024
- RRH & (La)HORDE, Kunsthalle Zurich, Switzerland 2024
- From Kalila wa Dimna to La Fontaine, Louvre Abu Dhabi, UAE, 2024
- In Real Time, NYU Abu Dhabi Art Gallery, Abu Dhabi, UAE, 2024
- Meaning, Inside-Out Art Museum, Beijing, China, 2023
- Ridiculously Yours! Art, Awkwardness And Enthusiasm, HALLE FÜR KUNST Steiermark, Graz, Austria, 2023
- A Line, A Web, A World, Powerhouse Museum, Sydney, Australia, 2023
- Step By Step Boogie Woogie, Une proposition d’Olivier Mosset, Space Collection, Liègel, Belgium, 2023
- Photography As a Tool, Krinzinger Schottenfeld, Vienna, Austria, 2023
- Artists Making Books: Poetry to Politics, British Museum, London, UK, 2022
- Ridiculously Yours! Art, Awkwardness And Enthusiasm, BundesKunsthalle, Bonn, Germany, 2022
- Floating Cinema | Unknown Waters, by Microclima, 3rd Edition, Venice, 2022
- A Century of the Artist's Studio: 1920–2020, Whitechapel Gallery, London, U.K., 2022
- Floating Cinema | Unknown Waters, by Microclima, 2nd Edition, Venice, 2021
- Screen Series, New Museum, New York, 2021
- In Three, Callicoon Fine Arts, New York, 2021
- Not of, in, Along, or Relating To a Line, The NYUAD Art Gallery, Abu Dhabi, 2021
- High Anxiety, 22 London, Asheville, North Carolina, USA, 2020
- Around the Days in Eighty Worlds, CAPC musée d'art contemporain de Bordeaux, France, 2020
- I Put a Spell On You: On Artist Collaborations, SCAD Museum of Art, Georgia, USA, 2020
- Constructions of Truth, Museum of Contemporary art and Design, Manila, Philippines, 2020
- Grassi Museum, Leipzig, Germany, 2019
- Museo d’Arte Contemporanea di Lissone (MAC), Italy, 2019
- Centro de Arte Contemporaneo de Quito, Ecuador, 2019
- Museo Storico dell Città di Lecce (MUST), Italy, 2019
- Louisiana Museum of Modern Art, humlebaek, Denmark, 2019
- The Phillips Collection in Partnership with the New Museum, Washington DC, 2018
- Mouvements Partagés, CACC, Clamart, France, 2018
- BACKLIT Gallery, Nottingham, 2018
- (BAK), Utrecht, Netherlands, 2017
- The Guggenheim, Abu Dhabi, UAE, 2017
- Speak, Lokal, Zurich Kunsthalle, Zurich, Switzerland, 2017
- Social Calligraphies, Zacheta National Gallery of Art, Warsaw, Poland, 2016
- Condo, Rodeo Gallery, London, U.K., 2016
- Domestic Affairs: Reshaped, Gallery Isabelle van den Eynde, Dubai, UAE, 2016
- The Fall, Rodeo Gallery, Istanbul, Turkey, 2015
- Nice Drawings, Gallery Isabelle van den Eynde, Dubai, UAE, 2015

=== Biennales ===
- The 22nd Biennale of Sydney, Australia (2020)
Installation View, 22nd Biennale of Sydney, Powerhouse Museum, 2020

Installation View of The 22nd Biennale of Sydney

Ramin Rokni Hesam, 2020, installation view at Powerhouse Museum as part of the 22nd Biennale of Sydney (with contribution by Javad Azimi)

Ramin Rokni Hesam, installation view at Powerhouse Museum as part of the 22nd Biennale of Sydney, 2020
- The inaugural Toronto Biennial of Art (2019)
- Busan Biennale, South Korea (2018)
- Rock, Paper, Scissors: Positions in Play, National Pavilion of United Arab Emirates, 57th Venice Biennale
- The 9th Liverpool Biennial, UK (2016)
- The 8th Asia Pacific Triennial, Brisbane, Australia (2015)

== Awards ==
- Prix Pébéo, 2024
- Black Mountain College Prize, 2022
- OGR Torino Prize, 2017
- 2nd Han Nefkens Foundation-MACBA Award, 2016

== Collections ==
- frac île‑de‑france, Paris, France
- The Louvre Abu Dhabi, UAE
- Musée d’Art et d’Histoire, Genève, Switzerland
- Art Gallery of New South Wales, Sydney, Australia
- FRAC, Corsica, France
- British Museum, London, UK
- Städel Museum, Frankfurt, Germany
- Museum of Applied Arts and Sciences, Powerhouse museum, Sydney, Australia
- Louisiana museum of Modern Art, Copenhagen, Denmark
- Frye Art Museum, Seattle, Washington
- Fundació Han Nefkens, Barcelona, Spain
- Collection Le Centre National des Arts Plastiques, Paris, France
- Borusan Contemporary Art Collection, Istanbul
- Los Angeles County Museum of Art (LACMA)
- Guy & Myriam Ullens Foundation Collection

== Publications ==
- Travel Book United Arab Emirates – RRH, Artists Edition, Louis Vuitton.
- 2020 Either He’s Dead or My Watch Has Stopped, Groucho Marx (While Getting The Patient's Pulse), 2020, Schirn Kunsthalle Frankfurt, Distanz Verlag, ISBN 9783954763337
- 2018 Forgive me distant wars for bringing flower home, 2018, Corraini Edizioni, ISBN 9788875707415
- 2016 Her Majesty?, 2016, Edition Patrick Frey, ISBN 9783836535182
- 2015 Ramin Haerizadeh Rokni Haerizadeh Hesam Rahmanian, 2015, Mousse Publishing, ISBN 9788867491353
