= List of Iranian painters =

The following is a list of Iranian painters.

== Classical era ==
=== Medieval era ===
- Ahmad Musa (fl. 14th century), miniaturist, possibly invented naturalistic Persianate painting during the Ilkhanate and Jalayirid Sultanate
- Shamsuddin (fl. until 1374), miniaturist, may have been the main artist of the Great Jalayirid Shahnameh
- Abd al-Hayy (1374–1405), miniaturist of the Jalayirid and Timurid courts

=== Safavid era ===
- Kamaleddin Behzad (1450–1535), head of the royal ateliers in Herat and Tabriz during the late Timurid and early Safavid eras
- Heydar Ali (fl. 16th century), painter at the court of Shah Tahmasp I
- Sultan Mohammed (16th century), painter at the court of Shah Ismail I and Shah Tahmasp I
- Abd al-Samad (16th century), painter at the Safavid and Mughal courts, a founder of the Mughal school of painting in India
- Mirza Ali (c. 1509–1575), miniaturist at the Safavid and Mughal courts
- Mir Musavvir (fl. 1510–48, died 1555), painter at the Safavid court in Tabriz and later the Mughal court in Kabul
- Dust Muhammad (fl. 1510–1564), miniaturist painter, calligrapher, and art historian
- Mir Sayyid Ali (1510–1572), miniaturist at the Safavid and Mughal courts
- Aqa Mirak (1520–1576), Safavid court painter
- Sadiqi Beg (c. 1533–1610), Safavid court painter
- Farrukh Beg (ca. 1547–post 1615), Safavid and Mughal court painter
- Reza Abbasi (1565–1635) miniaturist of the Isfahan School
- Muhammad Qasim (c. 1575–1659), Safavid miniaturist
- Aqā Rizā Haravi (fl. 1580–1620), from Khorasan, miniaturist at the Mughal court
- Mohammad Yusef (fl. 17th century), miniaturist, the Shahnameh of Rashida and the Windsor Shahnameh are attributed to him
- Mohammad Zaman (1650 – c. 1700), Safavid painter of the Farangi-Sazi style
- Aliquli Jabbadar (fl. 1666–1694), Safavid painter of the Farangi-Sazi style

=== Afsharid, Zand, and Qajar eras ===
- Mohammad Sadiq (18th century), Zand and Qajar court painter
- 'Ali Ashraf (fl c. 1735–1780) lacquer painter and miniaturist
- Abu'l-Hasan Mostawfi Ghaffari (died 1797/98), painter and historian
- Abdallah Khan (c. 1770–1850), court painter, muralist and architect of the Qajar court
- Mirza Baba (fl. 1785 – c. 1830), Qajar court painter
- Mihr 'Ali (fl. 1795–post 1830), Qajar court painter
- Heydar Ali (fl. 19th century), lacquer painter
- Esmail Jalayer (fl. 19th century), painter
- Abu'l-Hasan Sani al-Mulk (1814–1866), Chief court painter, miniaturist, lacquer painter, and book illustrator
- Agha Najaf Ali (fl. 1815 – c. 1860), painter
- Abu Torab Ghaffari (1863–1890), painter
- Yahya Ghaffari (died 1894–1905), court artist of watercolour and oil paintings

== Modern era ==
=== A ===
- Iman Afsarian (born 1974), realist painter
- Shahla Aghapour, Iranian-born German painter, author and gallery director
- Aydin Aghdashloo (1940– ), painter, graphic artist, art curator, writer, and film critic
- Mehdi Ahmadi (1966–2026), painter
- Samira Alikhanzadeh (1967– ), painter, mixed media artist
- Bahram Alivandi (1928–2012), Iranian-born Austrian modernist painter
- Massoud Arabshahi (1935–2019), painter, leading member of the Saqqakhaneh movement
- Kamrooz Aram (1978– ), contemporary painter, installation artist, collagist
- Mir Hossein Arjangi (1881–1963), painter
- Abbas Rassam Arjangi (1892–1975), painter
- Siah Armajani (1939–2020), conceptual artist

=== B ===
- Sadegh Barirani (1923-2025), modernist painter, graphic designer and calligraphic artist
- Jamal Bakhshpour (1944–2015), contemporary painter
- Mohammad Ali Baniasadi (1955– ), painter, illustrator, cartoonist and sculptor, known for illustrating children's books
- Hossein Behzad (1894–1968), painter
- Dariush Borbor (1934– ), Iranian-French architect, painter, urban planner, designer, sculptor, and writer

=== D ===
- Delara Darabi (1986–2009), executed for suspected murder, painter and poet
- Iran Darroudi (1936–2021), modernist painter
- Mir Abdolrez Daryabeigi (1930–2012), painter, gallerist, and an innovator of Iranian modern art
- Ali Divandari (1957– ), painter
- Bijan Daneshmand (1958– ), Iranian-born English actor, painter

=== E ===
- Ahmad Esfandiari (1922–2012), modernist painter
- Abolhassan Etessami (1903–1978), architect, calligrapher, painter, and novelist
- Zohreh Etezad Saltaneh (1962– ), artist, painter, carpet weaver

=== F ===
- Amir H. Fallah (1979– ), Iranian-born American painter, based in Los Angeles
- Roya Farassat (born 1964), painter, sculptor, based in New York City
- Monir Shahroudy Farmanfarmaian (1922–2019), painter, sculptor; known for her cut mirror mosaic work (Ayeneh-kari)
- Mahmoud Farshchian (1930–2025), master of Persian miniature painting, educator

=== G ===
- Mokarrameh Ghanbari (1928–2005), self-taught folk painter from northern Mazandaran Province
- Mansoor Ghandriz (1936–1966), modernist painter
- Marcos Grigorian (1925–2007), Iranian-Armenian and American painter, gallerist, a pioneer of Iranian modern art

=== H ===
- Raoof Haghighi (1976– ), Iranian-born British painter, known for portraiture and realism
- Fariba Hajamadi (1957– ), Iranian-born American painter, photographer, installation artist
- Khosrow Hassanzadeh (1963–2023), painter, printmaker and installation artist
- Haydar Hatemi (1945– ), painter, sculptor
- Mansooreh Hosseini (1926–2012), contemporary painter

=== J ===
- Pouran Jinchi (1959– ), Iranian-born American painter, sculptor, calligrapher

=== K ===
- Abbas Katouzian (1923–2008), painter
- Kamal-ol-Molk (1848–1940), painter, and member of the Ghaffari family in Kashan
- Keikhosro Khoroush (1941– ), painter and calligrapher
- Zhaleh Kazemi (1944–2005), painter, news anchor, and producer
- Shokufeh Kavani (1970– ), Iranian-born Australian contemporary painter, nurse
- Reza Khodadadi (1961– ), contemporary artist, academic, painter, sculptor, and muralist

=== L ===
- Farideh Lashai (1944– 2013), painter

=== M ===
- Iman Maleki (1976– ), painter of realism
- Leyly Matine-Daftary (1937–2007), modernist painter, educator
- Sirak Melkonian (1930–2024), modernist painter
- Farshid Mesghali (1943–), graphic designer, illustrator, and author
- Mohammad Modabber (1890–1966), painter
- Mohsen Vaziri-Moghaddam (1924–2018), painter and professor of art
- Farhad Moshiri (1963–2024), pop art painter
- Noreen Motamed (1967–), Iranian-born American painter
- Mir-Hossein Mousavi (1941– ), painter, architect and politician

=== N ===
- Naderi Yeganeh, Hamid (1990– ), Iranian mathematical artist
- Afshin Naghouni (1969– ), Iranian-British visual artist
- Shirin Neshat (1957– ), Iranian-American artist, photographer and filmmaker
- Nodjoumi, Nicky (1942– ), Iranian-American painter
- Nouri, Mina (1951– ), Iranian painter, and printmaker
- Novin, Guity (1944– ), Iranian-Canadian figurative painter, and graphic designer
- Nuri, Hossein (1954– ), Iranian painter, dramaturge, and filmmaker

=== O ===
- Kazem Ordoobadi (1919–2002), painter
- Nasser Ovissi (born 1934), Iranian-born American painter

=== P ===
- Kour Pour (1987– ), Iranian-British painter, printmaker

=== R ===
- Shokouh Riazi (1921–1965), modernist painter
- Tarlan Rafiee (1980 – ), painter and printmaker

=== S ===
- Gholamhossein Saber (born 1941), painter and photographer
- Ali Akbar Sadeghi (1937– ), painter
- Farhad Sadeghi Amini (1963– ), painter
- Behjat Sadr (1924–2009), modernist art painter
- Salimi, Homayoun (1948– ), painter and academic
- Sohrab Sepehri (1928–1980), poet and painter
- Tony Shafrazi (1943–), Iranian-born American contemporary art dealer, gallerist, and artist
- Naz Shahrokh (born 1969), conceptual artist
- Yashar Samimi Mofakham (1979 – ), painter and printmaker
- Keyvan Shovir (born 1985), Iranian-born American graffiti artist

=== T ===
- Amir Shayesteh Tabar (1967– ), painter and poet
- Towhidi Tabari (1964– ), painter and Persian style illuminator
- Jazeh Tabatabai (1931–2008), avant-garde painter, poet, and sculptor
- Sadegh Tabrizi (1938–2017), Iranian modern painter, calligrapher
- Hossein Taherzadeh Behzad (1889–1962), miniaturist, calligrapher, and carpet designer
- Taravat Talepasand (1979– ), American painter, sculptor of Iranian descent
- Mohammad Ali Taraghijah (1943–2010), painter of rural landscapes
- Parviz Tanavoli (1937–), sculptor, art historian, author

=== V ===
- Mohsen Vaziri-Moghaddam (1924–2018), painter and professor

=== Z ===
- Hossein Zenderoudi (1937– ), modernist painter and sculptor
- Jalil Ziapour (1920–1999), painter, academician, researcher, and writer

== See also ==
- List of Iranian artists
- List of Iranian women artists
