= Heydar Ali =

Heydar Ali may refer to:

- Heydar Ali (16th century), painter
- Heydar Ali (19th century), painter

== See also ==
- Heydarali, village in Iran
