= Aghdashloo =

Aghdashloo is a surname. Notable people with the surname include:

- Aydin Aghdashloo (born 1940), Iranian painter, graphist, art curator, cognoscente, writer, and film critic
- Shohreh Aghdashloo (born 1952), American film actor and activist
- Tara Aghdashloo (born 1988), Iranian-Canadian writer, director, producer and curator based in London
