= Ahmad Amin Nazar =

Iranian painter, draughtsman and printmaker (1955–2026)

- احمد امین‌نظر
- Born: 1955; Abadan, Iran
- Died: March 2026 (aged 70)
- Education: Faculty of Fine Arts, University of Tehran
- Known for: Painting, drawing, printmaking
- Movement: Contemporary Iranian art

Ahmad Amin Nazar (Persian: احمد امین‌نظر; 1955 – March 2026) was an Iranian painter, draughtsman, printmaker and art educator. In his expressive drawings, he had references to Persian painting, calligraphy, mythology and literature.

After studying fine art in Tehran, Amin Nazar spent approximately eight years in Germany, where he encountered European Neo-expressionism and joined an artists' association in Cologne. He later returned to Iran, where he taught drawing and painting both at universities and privately in his studio.

== Early life and education ==
Amin Nazar was born in Abadan in 1955. He attended a fine arts high school before studying at the Faculty of Fine Arts of the University of Tehran, where his teachers included Hannibal Alkhas and Mohsen Vaziri-Moghaddam.

During his studies he shown interest in the work of Francisco Goya, Honoré Daumier and Eugène Delacroix. In a later interview he described his early concern with avoiding direct imitation and developing an individual approach to drawing and painting.

He began making etchings while at university. Some of his prints were included in an international print exhibition at the Tehran Museum of Contemporary Art in 1985.

== Germany and return to Iran ==
In 1986 Amin Nazar left Iran, first to Paris and finally settling in Germany. He lived in Cologne, joined the local BBK artists' association and was exposed to contemporary European painting, especially Neo-expressionism.

Finally he returned to Iran in the mid-1990s and resumed his artistic and teaching activities in Tehran.

== Work ==
Amin Nazar's practice was strongly based in drawing. Line remained a central element from his early etchings to his later paintings and large works on paper.

Considered as a figurative painter, the main themes in his works includes wrestlers, mythical heroes, Deev(s) or demons, masks and figures derived from Iranian visual and literary traditions, and especially from the works by Mohammad Siyah Qalam. These subjects are combined with an expressive pictorial language shaped partly by his experience of European modern and Neo-expressionist painting.

Iranian painting, calligraphy and Persian literature also provided visual and conceptual sources for his work. Rather than reproducing historical forms directly, Amin Nazar incorporated them into a contemporary language based on gestural drawing and the expressive potential of the human figure.

== Teaching and influence ==
Amin Nazar taught for a period at the Tehran School of Visual Arts before leaving Iran. After returning, he taught at Islamic Azad University in Tehran and at the Art University of Yazd.

He also conducted private drawing classes in his own studio. Rokni Haerizadeh, Ramin Haerizadeh and Reza Abedini are amongst the artists who studied with him in Tehran.

== Exhibitions and Collections ==
Selected solo exhibitions include:

- Arya Gallery, Tehran, 1995 and 1996;
- Seyhoun Gallery, Tehran, 2004;
- Assar Gallery, Tehran, 2006;
- Homa Gallery, Tehran, 2007;
- The Centre Cannot Hold, Gallery Isabelle van den Eynde, Dubai, 2010;
- Salto, Gallery Isabelle van den Eynde, Dubai, 2012–2013.

His work was also shown in Tehran painting biennials and group exhibitions, as well as international art fairs including Abu Dhabi Art and The Armory Show in New York.

Amin Nazar's works is part of several national and international collections such as the British Museum and Tehran Museum of Contemporary Art.

== Publication ==
In 2010 a book of Amin Nazar's work titled Metamorphosis (Persian: دگردیسی) was published in Tehran by Nazar Publications.

== Death ==
Amin Nazar's was found dead in his studio and his death reported on 10 March 2026. He was 70.

== See also ==
- Iranian modern and contemporary art
- Hannibal Alkhas
- Mohsen Vaziri-Moghaddam
- Rokni Haerizadeh
