= Jamal Bakhshpour =

Iranian painter

Jamal Bakhshpour (Persian: جمال بخش‌‌پور; 15 September 1944 in Tabriz, Iran – 21 June 2015 in Cologne, Germany) was an Iranian contemporary painter.

== Life ==
Bakhshpour graduated from Fine Arts Vocational School, Faculty Of Decorative Arts in Tehran in 1967. He was a student of Mohsen Vaziri-Moghaddam He lived and worked in Germany since 1984.

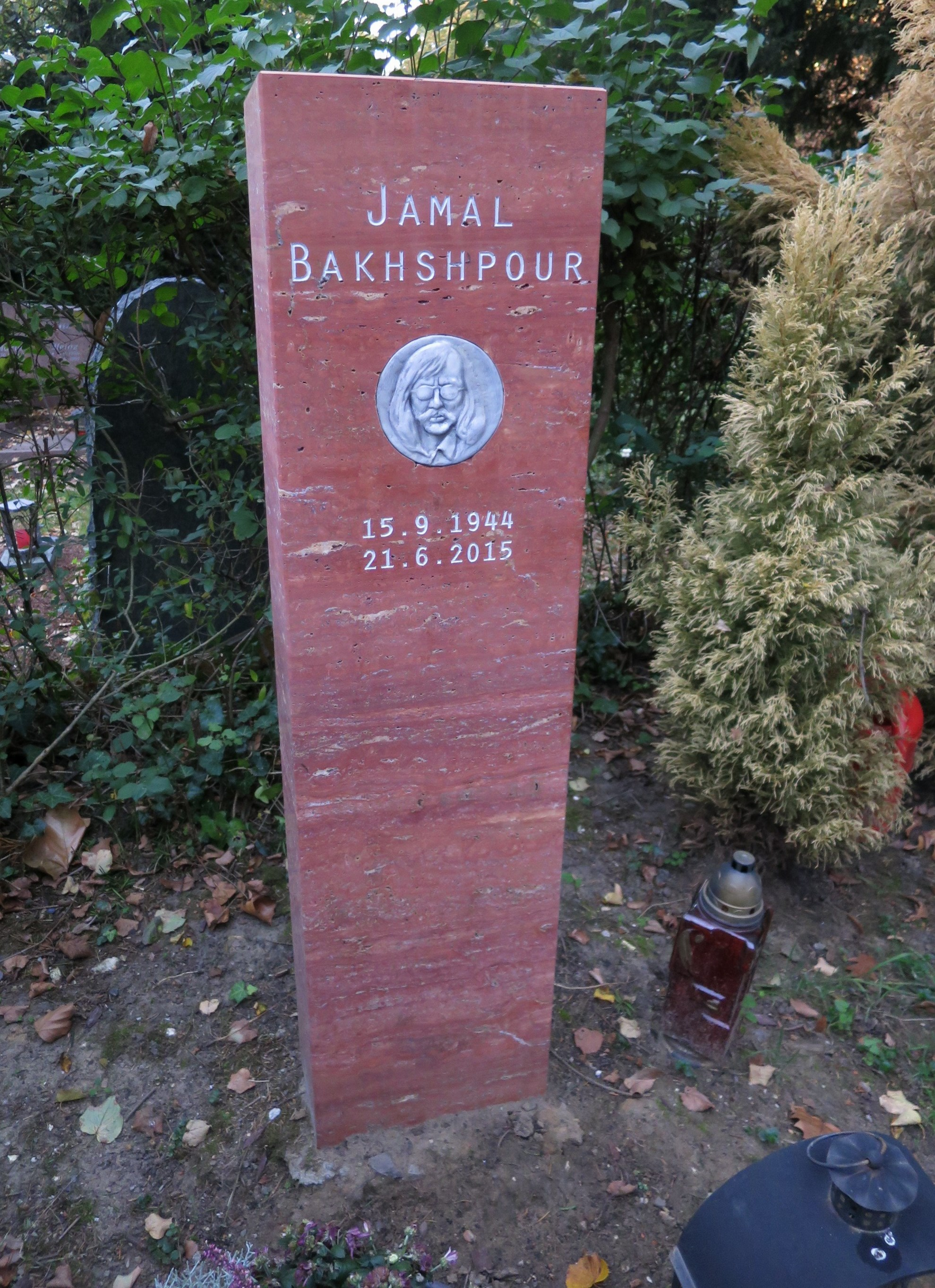
Bakhshpour's grave

Jamal Bakhshpour is one of the old and reputable, contemporary Iranian artists. He has lived and worked in Germany for the greater part of the past three decades. When he began to paint in the sixties, it was a pleasure to watch the technical skills and masterly proficiency with which he spread the continuous hachure throughout his work and it was evident that he is a painter with a rich imagination...

...As far as I am aware, during the last few decades, we haven't had any Iranian artist with Jamal Bakhshpour's imagination, mastership, technical skills and proficiency in the use of iron brush and brilliant colours. I hold great affection for Bakhshpour and his works and believe that his mastership and imagination are praiseworthy...

— Aydin Aghdashloo, Tehran January 2001

Jamal Bakhshpour died in 2015 at the age of 70 in Cologne, Germany, after years of battling cancer. His grave is in the Melaten cemetery (area 18 (C)).

== See also ==
- List of Iranian painters
