= Rokni Haerizadeh =

Iranian artist (born 1978)

Rokni Haerizadeh (born 1978) is an Iranian artist living and working in Dubai. He participated in the Carnegie International in 2013. He is part of a collective Ramin, Rokni, Hesam

== Early life ==
Rokni Haerizadeh was born in Tehran shortly before the start of the Iran-Iraq War. In a 2014 interview with Artforum, Haerizadeh described how his early experiences and questions about art were directly impacted by the war: "The TV programs at that time mostly depicted Islamic propaganda of the war, martyrs, and religion, but sometimes during the weekends they showed movies by directors such as Andrei Tarkovsky, Akira Kurosawa, Sergei Eisenstein […] Seeing, for example, a beautiful landscape with a man silently walking around for ten minutes moved me, and I wondered: Is that a movie? Is that art?"

== Career ==
Haerizadeh gained international attention during the mid-2000s for his paintings that brought together, on canvas, his observations about social or public gatherings in Iran – particularly weddings, religious festivals, funerals and banquets – and reveal the hedonistic, ritualised or violent sides of human nature that are buried in such spectacles. His diptych ‘Typical Iranian Wedding’ (2008) was exhibited in Unveiled: New Art From The Middle East at Saatchi Gallery, London, in 2009. This was followed by solo and group exhibitions in Paris, Dubai, New York and Istanbul.

After 2009, Haerizadeh sought new definitions of painterly practice that could lift the medium off white canvas. In his on-going project of works on paper, Fictionville (2009–) Haerizadeh paints directly onto news photographs or stills taken from news footage. Taking its title from the 1968 play Shahr-E Qesseh (‘City of Tales’) by Bijan Mofid, Fictionville "places […] emphasis on the equalizing effect of news cycles" and attempts to show how the media equates violence and popular protest with entertainment, interspersed with the spectacles of state visits and official pomp. Transforming the ‘characters’ contained in these stills into human-animal hybrids or mocking clownish figures, and their surroundings into ludicrous landscapes, "It is via the act of deliberate deformation that the work is anchored in the hand and body of the artist, and finally that the public is rendered private."

== ‘Moving Paintings’ ==
Haerizadeh’s ‘Moving paintings’ are rotoscope video works composed of thousands of individually-painted stills. "A painting is usually received by the viewer and by the critic as a fixed and static object, with the entire process of generating the work far removed from the final piece. It’s important for me to add this element of ‘time’, to slow down the process and to make that process visible. In this way, the painting unfolds before your eyes and transforms gradually."

‘Just What Is It That Makes Today’s Homes So Different, So Appealing?’ (2011) was first exhibited at Sharjah Biennial 10. Haerizadeh subverted thousands of stills taken from news network coverage and amateur videos of the 2009 post-election riots in Tehran into a theatrical drama of human-animal hybrids. The work "is an attempt to establish some artistic discourse on the current era of unrest. In an intoxicating popular culture built on protest, self-made videos and civilian heroes, reality, the work seems to suggest, has been lost in this search for almost religious moral certitude on both sides of the struggle."

Haerizadeh has created two subsequent rotoscope works, ‘Reign of Winter’ (2013), using footage from the 2011 Royal Wedding of Prince William and Kate Middleton, and ‘Letter’ (2014) in collaboration with Ramin Haerizadeh & Hesam Rahmanian, which mines the virulent, performative nature of a Femen protest. Both works point to the underlying ideology that is consumed via such voyeuristic, media-powered spectacle. These rotoscope works debuted at the Carnegie International and Here And Elsewhere at the New Museum, New York, respectively.

== Collaborative ==
Haerizadeh has lived and worked with artists Ramin Haerizadeh and Hesam Rahmanian in Dubai since 2009. As a culmination of their collaborations in Tehran, and the daily practice of a very precise discipline of living and working together in Dubai, the three artists staged their first collaborative exhibition, I Put It There You Name It, at Gallery Isabelle van den Eynde in 2012, recreating the atmosphere of their house that set out to challenge the bare, white-walled exhibition format through painted floors, assemblage and collaboratively-created objects. "When you enter this house, it has a certain feeling, but that doesn’t come from the individual art on the walls, it’s only together – the assemblage of the room – that they make something, from the fruits we put on the table to the art that we live with."

The three artists participated as a collective in the Robert Rauschenberg Foundation’s residency programme in 2014. Later that year they staged their second collaborative exhibition at Gallery Isabelle van den Eynde, The Exquisite Corpse Shall Drink The New Wine, described in the press as a "a spectacular visual orgy".

== Collections ==
His works are held in public and private collections, including the Carnegie Museum of Art, the British Museum, Tate Modern, the Devi Art Foundation, the JP Morgan Chase Art Collection and the Rubell Family Collection.

Rokni Haerizadeh

2014 One Torino, Shit and Die, Palazzo Cavour, Torino, Italy
2014 The Exquisite Corpse Shall Drink the New Wine, collaborative show with Ramin Haerizadeh and Hesam Rahmanian, Gallery Isabelle van den Eynde, UAE
2014 Here and Elsewhere, New Museum, New York, USA
2013 Carnegie International 2013, Pittsburgh, USA
2012 I Put It There You Name It, collaborative show with Ramin Haerizadeh and Hesam Rahmanian, Gallery Isabelle van den Eynde, Dubai, UAE
2011 About Painting, abc art berlin contemporary, Berlin, Germany
2010 Fictionville, Sharjah Biennial, UAE
2009 Unveiled, New Art from the Middle-East, Saatchi Gallery, London, UK
2009 Be Crowned With Laurel In Oblivion, Galerie Thaddaeus Ropac, Paris, France
2007 Wishes and Dreams, Iranian New Generation Emerges Meridian, International Center, Touring exhibition, USA
2006 Iranian art today, Museum fur Neue Kunst, Freiburg, Germany
2004 Gardens of Iran, Tehran Contemporary Museum of Art, Tehran, Iran

== See also ==
Chinese & Middle Eastern Contemporary Art Expert

- Jean-Marc Decrop
- Ahmad Amin Nazar
