= Shayesteh =

Shayesteh is both a feminine given name and surname. In Persian, "شایسته" means "worthy" or "admirable".

Notable people with the name include:

== Given name ==
- Shayesteh Ghaderpour (born 1984), Iranian chess player
- Shayesteh Irani (born 1979), Iranian actress
- Amir Shayesteh Tabar (born 1967), Iranian artist

== Surname ==
- Faysal Shayesteh (born 1991), Afghan footballer
- Qays Shayesteh (born 1998), Afghan footballer
