= Beautiful/Decay =

Art magazine

- Categories: Art magazine
- Founder: Amir Fallah; Jay Littleton
- Founded: 1996
- Country: United States
- Language: English
- Website: beautifuldecay.com

Beautiful/Decay is an art magazine created by Amir H. Fallah and Jay Littleton. First published as a black-and-white zine at a Kinko's in 1996, it was resurrected as a full-fledged magazine in 2001. In his Basics Illustration series, author and artist Mark Wigan named it an essential magazine resource for "global contexts".
