= Amir H. Fallah =

- Born: 1979 (age 46–47); Tehran
- Other name: Amir Fallah
- Education: Maryland Institute College of Art; University of California, Los Angeles
- Known for: Painting, Sculpture, Public Art
- Awards: Artadia Award; COLA Artist Fellowship; Northern Trust Purchase Prize; Joan Mitchell Foundation
- Website: http://www.amirhfallah.com/

Amir H. Fallah (born Tehran, Iran, 1979) is an Iranian-born American painter, publisher, sculptor, and installation artist. He was a founder of Beautiful/Decay magazine. He is based in Los Angeles, California.

== Art ==
His paintings have a flat graphic quality to them and often feature borders, reminiscent of Persian miniature painting and comic books. There are many patterns used, and bright colors. Fallah's work deals with complex issues of identity and diaspora.

== Work and Themes ==
In his work, Amir H. Fallah explores systems of representation embedded in the history of Western art. He considers themes around identity, immigration, displacement, and cultural hybridity, all articulated through a complex network of symbols and imagery. Throughout his work, the artist addresses the liminal space of otherness, a reflection of his family's journey and his own life experience as an entry point to discuss race, representation, erasure, and the memories of forgotten cultures and countries left behind.

=== Portraiture ===
In his figurative works, Fallah takes central subjects and substitutes their exact likenesses with more holistic representations of their personhood, instead emphasizing aspects of their lives that span history, geography, and culture. The artist seeks to challenge not only the historical role of portraiture, but also the larger systems that are used to identify one person from another. Fallah recontextualizes an otherwise rigid and familiar canonical system: through historically charged poses and compositions, coupled with the obscuring of the subjects actual portraits, the artist embraces ambiguity, weaving fact and fiction as a means of encompassing the many facets of a person's identity. The artist has commented that he has been frequently met with misperception and confusion about his identity, leading to his interest in how identity is manifested, obscured, and neutralized in the scope of American culture. He balances the figures’ own stories – evidenced by the inclusion of their most intimate and deeply held possessions – while also underscoring common truths about the global immigrant experience.

=== Grids ===
In an ongoing series of works entitled Grids, the artist pulls from autobiography and personal memory, incorporating a lexicon of symbols, and bringing together his life experience with historical parables and aspects of contemporary life. These works, uniting disparate elements within geometric grid patterns, serve almost as a diary of lessons, warnings, truths, and parables. The artist reflects on fatherhood as well, leaving a trail of teachings for a new generation. These works provide coded insight into the formation of one's identity, while investigating cultural values often passed down through generations. Fallah frequently relays his experience as an Iranian-American immigrant and refugee, using combinations of visual material derived from Eastern and Western visual culture. The picture planes are flattened, layered, and stacked, bringing together imagery that the artist sources and reassembles from digitized museum collections, tumblr, library archives, and other ephemera. The artist considers these works in the realm of self-portraiture, again challenging notions of portraiture altogether. Composed of Arabesque decorative borders, the Grids draw a continuous thread between each compositional element, weaving together multiple narratives, eliminating any sense of hierarchy, and making connections where they might not otherwise exist.

=== Public Art ===
Since 2001, Fallah has developed and completed over 20 site-specific commissioned projects, including murals for private and public spaces. He has created murals for the permanent collection of Cerritos College in Norwalk, California, the Museum of Art and History (MOAH) in Lancaster, California, and the Museum Of Contemporary Art (MOCA) in Tucson, Arizona. In 2021, he created a sculptural installation in stained glass at the new headquarters of the Los Angeles County Department of Public Health. The installation, entitled Portals, is a stained glass work that continues his recent work with stained glass and is his largest work in the medium to date.

== Collections ==
Fallah has work in the permanent collections of the Los Angeles County Museum of Art, Los Angeles; Birmingham Museum of Art, Alabama; Jorge M. Pérez Collection, Miami; Deste Foundation For Contemporary Art, Athens, Greece; Xiao Museum Of Contemporary Art, Rizhao, China; McEvoy Foundation For The Arts, San Francisco; Nerman Museum, Kansas City; SMART Museum of Art at the University of Chicago; Davis Museum, Massachusetts; The Microsoft Collection, Washington; Plattsburg State Art Museum, NY; Cerritos College Public Art Collection, CA; Los Angeles County Department of Arts & Culture, CA; and Salsali Private Museum, Dubai, UAE.

== See also ==
- List of Iranian painters
- Category:Artists from Los Angeles
- Category:Contemporary painters
