= Mir Hossein Arjangi =

Iranian painter

- Born: 1881; Tabriz, Qajar Iran
- Died: 1963 (aged 81–82); Pahlavi Iran
- Family: Agha Ebrahim (father); Abbas Rassam Arjangi (brother); Farhad Arjangi (nephew)

Mir Hossein Arjangi (also spelled Arzhangi; Persian: میر حسین ارجنگی; 1881–1963) was an Iranian painter. A native of Tabriz, he was the son of Agha Ebrahim, a court painter under Mozaffar ad-Din Shah Qajar (r. 1896–1907), and had a younger brother named Abbas Rassam Arjangi. "Arjangi" was a surname the two brothers later adopted, based on the Arzhang, the illustrated book of Mani, the 3rd-century founder of Manichaeism, whom they considered the legendary founder of Iranian painting. In 1903, Mir Hossein and Abbas Rassam relocated to the Russian Empire, staying in the city of Tiflis. After 1908, the two brothers moved to Moscow, but had moved back to Iran by 1914 due to World War I. Returning to Tabriz, Mir Hossein opened a painting school there. Although not much is known about the school, it might have taught the same Russian painting styles that was used in Tiflis and Moscow.

Possibly due to their political views, Mir Hossein and Abbas Rassam have not been given much credit for their contributions to the history of modern Iranian art.

== Gallery ==
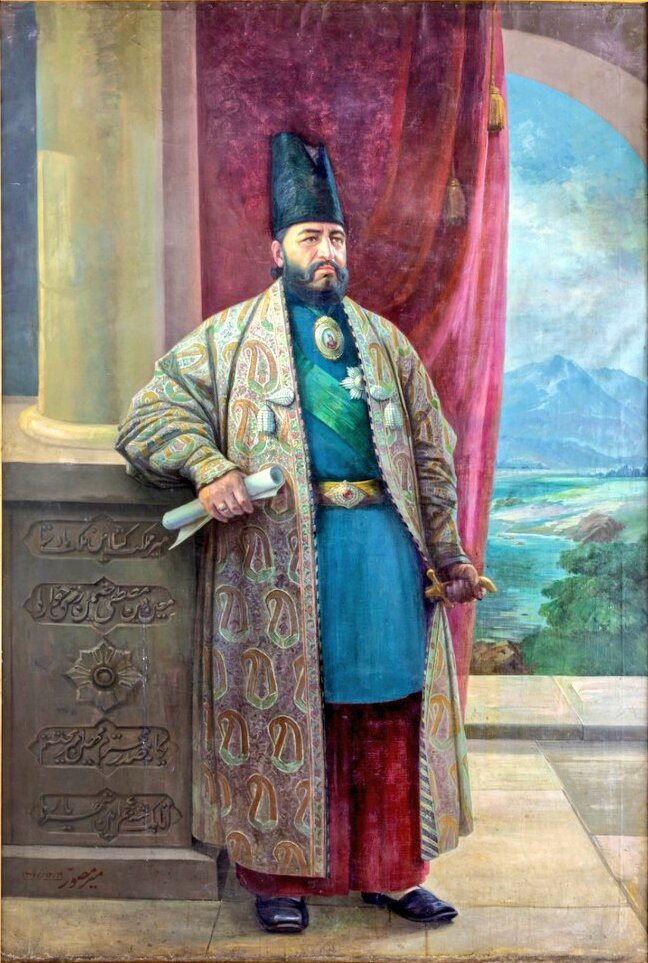
Portrait of the 19th-century Iranian prime minister Amir Kabir in the Golestan Palace

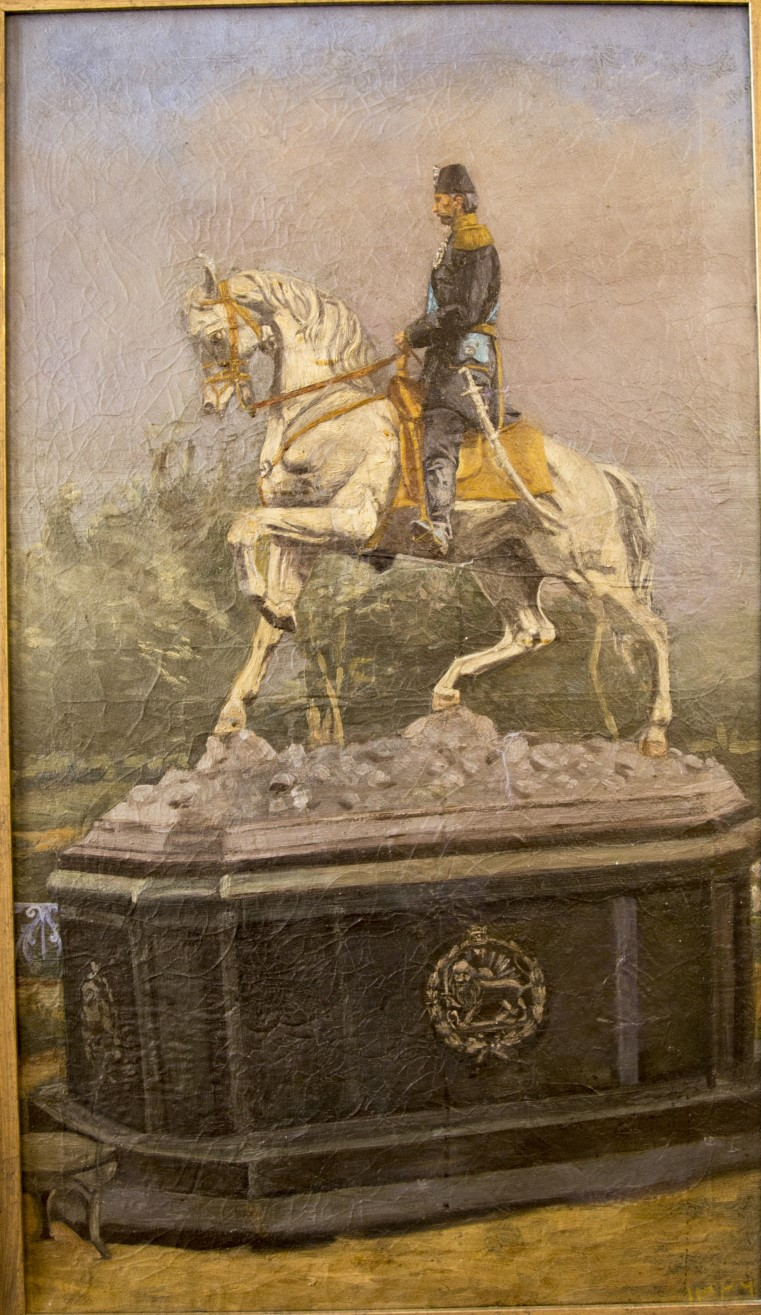
Illustration of the Equestrian Statue of Naser al-Din Shah in the Negarestan Palace

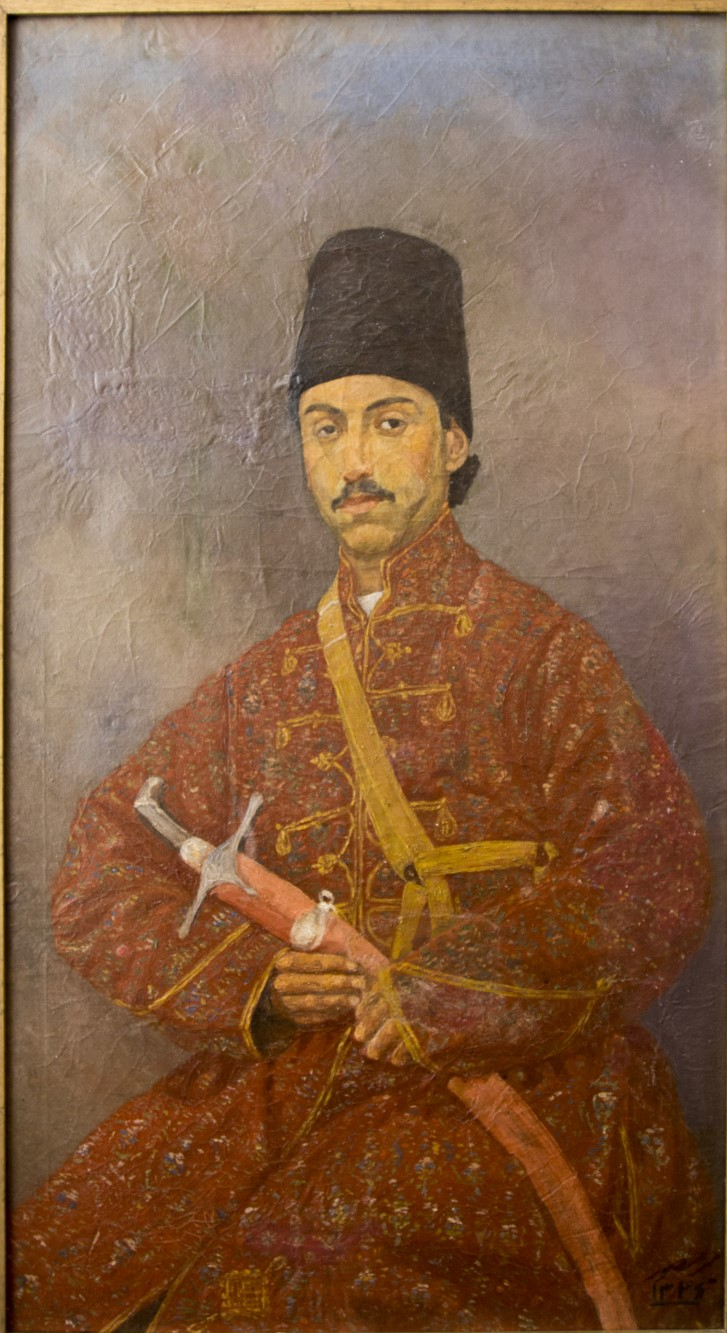
Portrait of a Qajar prince in the Negarestan Palace

== Sources ==
- Adinehvand, Fahimeh Khosravi (2023). "ارژنگی". The Great Islamic Encyclopaedia (in Persian).
- Diba, Layla S. (2025). "Border Crossings: Iranian Artists in Tsarist Russia and Georgia". In Amanat, Abbas; Gledhill, Kevin; Nejad, Kayhan A. (eds.). The Caspian World: Connections and Contentions at a Modern Eurasian Crossroads. Cornell University Press. pp. 247–268. ISBN 978-1501781292.
