= Hannibal Alkhas =

- هانیبال الخاص
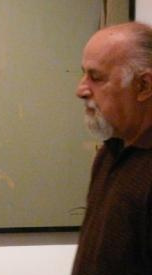
- Born: June 16, 1930; Kermanshah, Iran
- Died: September 13, 2010 (aged 80); California
- Education: Firooz Bahram High School; School of the Art Institute of Chicago
- Occupations: Painter, art critic and teacher, translator and writer
- Political party: Tudeh Party of Iran

Hannibal Alkhas (Persian: هانیبال الخاص; June 16, 1930 – September 13, 2010) was an artist of Assyrian descent from Iran. Alkhas was among the contemporary Iranian modernist painters and pioneered figurative design in modernist painting, becoming one of the most influential painters and art instructors shaping the course of contemporary Iranian painting. He was active in the teaching of art for thirty-five years.

In 1986, due to the persecution faced by intellectuals and artists in the 1980s, he left Iran and continued his life in the United States. In later years, he made extended visits to Iran, but did not permanently reside there again. He died in California.

== Early life and background ==
Hannibal Alkhas was born in Kermanshah in 1930 to an Assyrian family; due to his father's job as a customs officer, they moved from one city to another every few years. He completed his secondary education at Firooz Bahram High School.

His father, Addai Alkhas, and uncle, John Alkhas, were both poets in the Assyrian (Suret) language. Together they founded the Assyrian literary magazine Gilgamesh, which was published from 1952 until 1961. Hannibal Alkhas was the brother of Marduk Al-Khas, a film director and screenwriter who died in 2008.

== Artistic education ==
At the age of fourteen, he first encountered oil painting through a young man named Alexei Georgievich, who had learned painting in Russia. Hannibal eagerly visited him, cleaned his palette, arranged colors for him, and observed his paintings. According to him, "Sometimes he would give me paper and colors and say, 'Paint'."

Later, he seriously pursued painting under the guidance of Professor Jafar Petgar. He spent two and a half years studying classical painting in Petgar's class before going to the United States. There, he initially enrolled in medical school but abandoned it to study philosophy and then painting. He obtained a bachelor's and master's degree in Illustration from the School of the Art Institute of Chicago in 1956 and 1958, respectively.

== Career ==
Over his career, Alkhas produced hundreds of square meters of paintings on canvas, paper, and murals. He had more than 100 solo exhibitions and 200 group exhibitions in Iran, Europe, Canada, America, and Australia. For more than thirty-five years he worked in art education and teaching. While heavily involved in art instruction, art criticism, and in artist organizations and promotion, his painting consistently cast its artistic shadow over his other endeavors. Besides his dedication to painting, Hannibal Alkhas had a love for poetry, writing and translating many works.

=== Teaching ===
Alkhas taught at the Boys' Art School, the School of Fine Arts at the University of Tehran, the Monticello School in Illinois, United States, and the Islamic Azad University. Hannibal Alkhas authored four books on art education and designed covers for dozens of books. He was an active member of various sessions of the two-year course, "Contemporary Iranian Painting" in the 50s and 60s. His notable students include Bahram Dabiri and Mohammad Ali Baniasadi.

=== Art scene ===
After returning to Iran in his early 40s, he was introduced to the country's literary society, through Jalal Al-e Ahmad. He joined the active intellectuals of the country and maintained these relationships until the end of his life.

He managed the Gilgamesh Gallery for two years. For four years in the 1970s, he wrote art critiques for the Kayhan newspaper.

After the revolution, he joined the Iranian Society of Artists and Writers, becoming a member of its executive board in 1979. Alongside other artists with a tendency towards the Tudeh Party, in 1985 he painted the walls of the United States Embassy in Tehran – at the time occupied by followers of Imam's Line – with anti-imperialist designs and images.

=== Works ===
Alkhas has created thousands of paintings, including large and small canvases, 300 square meters of murals, and three 15-piece and four 8-piece curtains. One of his most important works is the 15-piece painting "Creation." In 2002, at the age of 80, he celebrated 50 years of his paintings in the Azadi Museum.

Apart from painting, he was involved in literature. He wrote thousands of couplets, quatrains, haikus, odes, epics, and ghazals. He translated 150 ghazals of Hafez into Assyrian with rhyme, rhythm, meaning, and humor, accompanied by over 50 images of his works. He also translated works from Nima Youshij, Iraj Mirza, Mirzadeh Eshghi, and Parvin E'tesami into Assyrian. His letters from exile to the poet M. Azad (Mahmoud Mosharraf Azad Tehrani) were published in 1999, titled From Exile with Love.
