= Farhad Sadeghi Amini =

Iranian painter (born 1963)

- Painter
- Born: Farhad Sadeghi Amini; 1963 (age 62–63); Isfahan, Imperial State of Iran
- Known for: Painting
- Website: https://www.sadeghiamini.com/

Farhad Sadeghi Amini (Persian: فرهاد صادقی امینی; born 1963) is an Iranian painter.

== Awards and recognitions ==
- 2008, Mayor of Wellington New Zealand
- 2005, Letter of Appreciation, from Culture Heritage, Handicrafts Industry &Tourism Org
- 2005, Assumption University in Thailand
- 2002, Saadi Shiraz Foundation in Tirana Albania
- 2002, Silk Road Festival in Pakistan Kashmir

== Exhibitions ==
- 2017-DiverCity exhibition at the Deer Lake Gallery
- 2017 Artexpo New York APRIL 21–24, 2017 | PIER 94
- 2017 Luminescence Exhibition Hosted by Deer Lake Gallery
- 2016- le soleil fine art Gallery Vancouver
- 2013-14, North Vancouver Crawl at Supernal Arts Academy
- 2014, Burnaby Art Council Director’s 2008
- 2010, Tehran, Art expo of Tehran.
- .2008, Wellington, Individual Exhibition in New Zealand, Academy of Fine Arts Galleries
- 2008, Tehran, Art expo of Tehran.
- 2008, Wellington, Individual Exhibition in New Zealand, Academy of Fine Arts Galleries
- 2008, Tehran Art expo,
- 2007, Almaty, Individual Exhibition in Kazakhstan, Kastenlauf National Museum
- 2006, Ankara, Individual Exhibition in Turkey
- 2005, Dubai, Individual Exhibition in Dubai trade center
- 2004, Tehran, Nature from the view of an oriental painter in Academy of arts (Bagh-e-Saba)
- 2005, Bangkok, Individual Exhibition in Thailand, Four Wings Hotel
- 2005, Bangkok, Individual Exhibition in Thailand, Fine Arts University
- 2005, Bangkok, Individual Exhibition in Thailand, in intercontinental hotel
- 2005, Bangkok, Individual Exhibition in Thailand, in Assumption University
- 2003, Albania Individual Exhibition in Dores Art Hall
- 2002, Albania, Tirana, Individual Exhibition in Albania Tirana in History Museum and in Dores
- 2002, Tehran, Biennial of painting in Contemporary Art Museum
- 2002, Pakistan Gilgit, Individual Exhibitionin Pakistan
- 2002, Turkey, Islamabad, Individual Exhibition in Pakistan, Lok Virsa Museum
- 2002, Tehran, Group exhibition in Dorsa gallery
- 2002, Canada Toronto, Individual Exhibition in Canada Science Centre
- 2002, Canada, Toronto, Individual Exhibition, Parvizy Gallery
- 2001, Tehran, Individual exhibition in Dorsa gallery
- 2000, Tehran, Biennial of Iranian painting in Contemporary Art Museum
- 1999, Dubai, Group Exhibition in Dubai trade center
- 1999, Tehran, Group exhibition in Dorsa gallery
- 1999, Bosnia, Individual Exhibition in Bosnia in central art gallery
- 1999, Tehran, Individual exhibition in Dorsa gallery
- 1999, Tehran, Individual exhibition in Teheran gallery
- 1999, Bosnia-Herzegovina Central Art Museum
- 1998, Dubai, Group Exhibition in Dubai trade center
- 1997, Dubai, Individual Exhibition in Dubai trade center
- 1996, Dubai, Individual Exhibition in Dubai trade center (December)
- 1996, Dubai, Individual Exhibition in Dubai trade center (September)
- 1993, Tehran, International exhibition of fine arts.
- 1978, Isfahan, Group Exhibition in high school of Fine Arts
- 1987, Tehran, Group exhibition in fine arts department, University of Tehran
- 1986, Tehran, Experience painters
- 1985, Tehran, Individual Exhibition

== Publications ==
- 1999, Learning to Draw (elementary) Published by Reyhaneh Publication
- 2001, Learning to Draw (advanced) Published by Reyhaneh Publication
- 2001, Learning to Draw Published by Reyhaneh Publication

== Licenses and Certificates ==
- Applying and designing fine arts programs for PTIB and have got approval from PTIB in British Columbia for Supernal Arts Academy & Canadian Arts & Sciences Academy
- Design of the curriculums for a fine art diploma/Illustration included 8 courses as 6 month program and /two month programs as a Painting1,2,3 and/Drawing1,2,3
- Juror of international film Burnaby Film Forum at Burnaby Arts Council(BAC) 2016
- Panel of public forum sponsored by B.A at Shadbolt Center 2016
- Member of art Gallery advocacy at Burnaby Arts Council(BAC) 2013-2017
- Vice president of CARFAC, B.C 2017-2018
- Director of Board at Burnaby Arts Council
- Member of Scientific-Specialty Committee of Visual Arts International Kharazmy Festival
- Member of Board of University Applied-Comprehensive University
- Management of Dorsa Art Gallery
- Management of Dorsa Fine arts institute

== Academic Records ==
- 1980, Fine arts school, Painting
- 1990, Bachelor's degree, Fine arts, Tehran University, painting.
- 2000, Master's degree, Fine arts, Shahed University, painting.

== Teaching Activity ==
- Oppenheimer Community Art Show - Painting Workshops 2018
- Teaching at Shadbolt Center Portrait painting/-Fantasy painting-Meditative art Portrait painting. 2016-2018
- Teaching drawing, painting and illustration university level courses at Canadian Arts & sciences Inst. 2015-2017
- Teaching drawing, painting and illustration university level courses at Supernal Arts Inst. 2012-2015
- From 1994 till now, in Fine arts universities.
- From 1994 to 2008, teaching in Science and Culture University.
- From 2008 to 2009, teaching in Kashan university, Faculty of handy craft and architecture.

== Accreditation ==
- From 2005 to 2009, member of Scientific-Specialty Committee of Visual Arts International Kharazmy (Section of Student and associate degree Student).
- From 2005 to 2009 member of Board of University Applied-Comprehensive University .
