= Zohreh Etezad Saltaneh =

Iranian artist (born 1962)

Zohreh Etezad Saltaneh (Persian: زهره اعتضادالسلطنه; born 1962) also known as Zahra Etezad al-Saltaneh, is an Iranian visual artist, and teacher for the disabled. She is known for her paintings, calligraphy, and weaving. Saltaneh was born with a congenital defect and has no arms or hands, and she has learned to use her feet.

== Biography ==
Zohreh Etezad Saltaneh was born in 1962 in Tehran, Iran. She was born with a birth defect affecting the development of her arms and hands. Saltaneh had nine siblings and she was taught by her mother at a young age to use her feet in order to help out in the household. She has learned to paint, write, and weave with her feet; as well as play ping pong, cook, feed herself, type on the computer, text, and more.

Saltaneh has received many international awards for her artwork, and has held over 60 art exhibitions around the world. She has taught young people with similar disabilities how to gain more control of their feet.
