= Tara Aghdashloo =

Iranian writer

- تارا آغداشلو
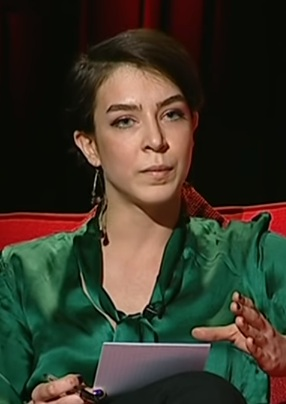
- Born: Tehran, Iran
- Occupations: Writer, Director, Producer, Author
- Parents: Aydin Aghdashloo (father); Firouzeh "Fay" Athari (mother)
- Website: www.taraaghdashloo.com

Tara Aghdashloo (Persian: تارا آغداشلو) is an Iranian-born writer and director.

She is an advocate for women's rights issues, and has attended panels on issues relating to Iran and the Middle East, as well as discussions on women and diversity in filmmaking. Her activism has made her a target for the Iranian authorities.

== Biography ==
Tara Aghdashloo was born in Tehran to the architect Firouzeh "Fay" Athari and the painter Aydin Aghdashloo. When she was in high school her family moved to Toronto, Canada.

She studied print journalism and political science at the Toronto Metropolitan University, and Global Media and Post-national Communication at London University's School of Oriental and African Studies.

== Work ==
=== Film and television ===
Aghdashloo's first narrative short The Ride premiered at Cinequest Film Festival in California and was funded by BFI Network, Canada Council of the Arts, and Toronto Arts Council. The short film Bridge, commissioned by the BBC, was based on a spoken-word poem by Gemma Barnett and premiered at Norwich Film Festival. Her third narrative short, Empty Your Pockets, is her first Persian language film.

Tara's journalism and documentaries have appeared on Channel 4 News, and BBC World. She was a founding co-host and producer on the first Persian-speaking all-female talk show, Samte No.

=== Writing ===
Her poetry has appeared in English and Persian magazines, and her poetry collection, This is Not a Pomegranate, was published by Shahrvand Publications in 2011.

=== Curation ===
She co-directed and curated The Invisible Line (TIL) Gallery in East London for two years. In 2017 she curated a retrospective of Portuguese artist Cristina Rodrigues in Castelo Branco Museum. She frequently reviews art by Iranian and Middle Eastern artists.

== Filmography ==
Year	Title	Type	Role	Notes
2024	Empty Your Pockets	Short film	Writer, director & producer	Awards: Outstanding Short Film Direction, Outstanding Short Lead Actor (ReelWorld Film Festival), Best Director (HB Film Festival), Best Fiction Film (Festival International du Film de Vebron), Best Foreign Short Film (Unrestricted View), Best Short Film (Quarantine Film Festival), Best Drama (Sustain Film Festival), Best International Short (Giddy Island Film Festival), Special Jury Mention (Kaafilm Festival).
2023	Bridge	Short film	Director	Short film adaptation of an award winning poem by Gemma Barnett who also stars in it. Nominated for Best UK Short (Unrestricted Festival), Best Drama (Southport Festival), Best Cinematography (Mansfield Festival), and Best Original Score (Mansfield Festival). Festivals (18 nominations): Norwich Film Festival, Catania Film Festival, This is England Film Festival, Afrodite Shorts Film Festival, Alessandria Film Festival, Leiden International Film Festival, Contemporanea Film Festival, Job Film Festival, KIN Festival, Norwich Film Festival, TweetFest Film Festival, Lichtspielklub Short Film Festival, British Shorts, Unrestricted View Film Festival, Southport Film Festival, Mansfield Town Film Festival, MoliseCinema International Film Festival, Bardi Film Festival, I Will Tell International Film Festival, HB Film Festival, North East Film Festival, Love Your Shorts Film Festival, Romford Film Festival Awards: Best European Short Film (Catania Film Festival), Best Director and Best Actress (Alessandria Film Festival), Best International Director and Best International Short film (Contemporanea Festival), Best Narrative Short and Best Actress (I Will Tell Festival), Imagine This International Women’s Film Festival, Atlanta Women’s Film Festival, The Women’s Film Festival.
2022	The Ride	Short film	Writer & director	Debut short film premiered at the Oscar Qualifying Cinequest Festival. Supported by Canada Council of the Arts, BFI Network, and Toronto Arts Council.
