= Mohammad Ali Baniasadi =

Iranian painter

محمدعلی بنی‌اسدی Mohammad Ali Baniasadi
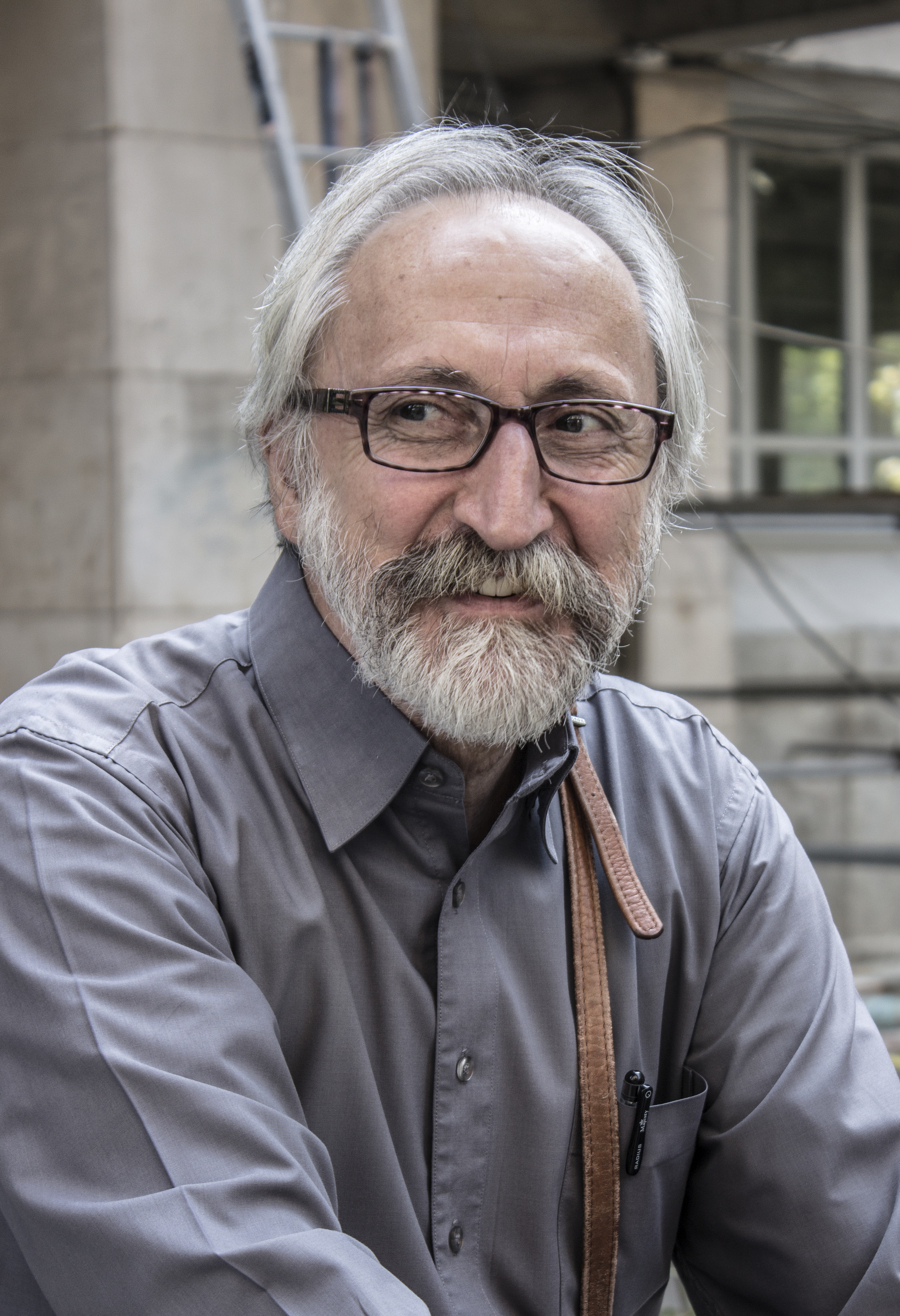
- Born: 27 November 1955 (age 70); Semnan, Iran
- Education: BA in Painting, MA in Illustration
- Alma mater: Tehran University
- Known for: Painting, Illustration
- Website: baniasadi.com

Mohammad Ali Baniasadi (Persian: محمدعلی بنی‌اسدی; born 1955) is an Iranian painter, illustrator, cartoonist and sculptor. He is best known for illustrating children's books and magazines for four decades, which brought him the nomination for Hans Christian Andersen Award, known as the Little Nobel prize in 2012, as one of the five finalists for the award, and also nomination for the Astrid Lindgren Memorial Award for four consecutive years since 2013.

He was one of the founding members of Iran Association of Children's Book Illustrators and the chairman of its first board of directors.

== Life and education ==
He was born on November 27, 1955, Semnan, Iran. His mother was a school teacher and his father was a Civil Registry employee who had a hobby of book binding and painting and became a paint seller after retirement. Playing with father's tools made him interested in arts and at the age of 16 he decided to leave his hometown for Tehran, to study arts. In 1974 he received a degree in sculpture from Kamal-ol-Molk Conservatory and began a two-year course of animation under Zarrinkelk instruction and started working as a trainer in Institute for the Intellectual Development of Children and Young Adults (Kanoon) the same year, for six years till 1980 Cultural Revolution closing of educational centers following by Iran 1979 revolution. He also succeeded receiving his bachelor's degree in painting from Tehran University right before the so-called Cultural Revolution. His notable teachers were Marcos Grigorian, Mohsen Vaziri-Moghaddam, Jalal Shabahangi and Morteza Momayez. In 2001 he got his master's degree in illustration from the same school. During the 70s he was mostly active as an editorial cartoonist. His [early] influences were Buñuel (whom he admires for his single-minded determination to do what he wanted to do), Picasso, Miro and Klee (the influences of early twentieth century modernists is strong on many Iranian artists). Like many of his generation, his potential has been limited by the many changes that took place in Iran as he was growing up. The fall of the Shah, the closure of universities and the burning of books, the Iran-Iraq conflict (in which he had to serve), all hindered his development. In spite of this, his work has won prizes in Japan and Italy.

== Style ==
=== Painting ===
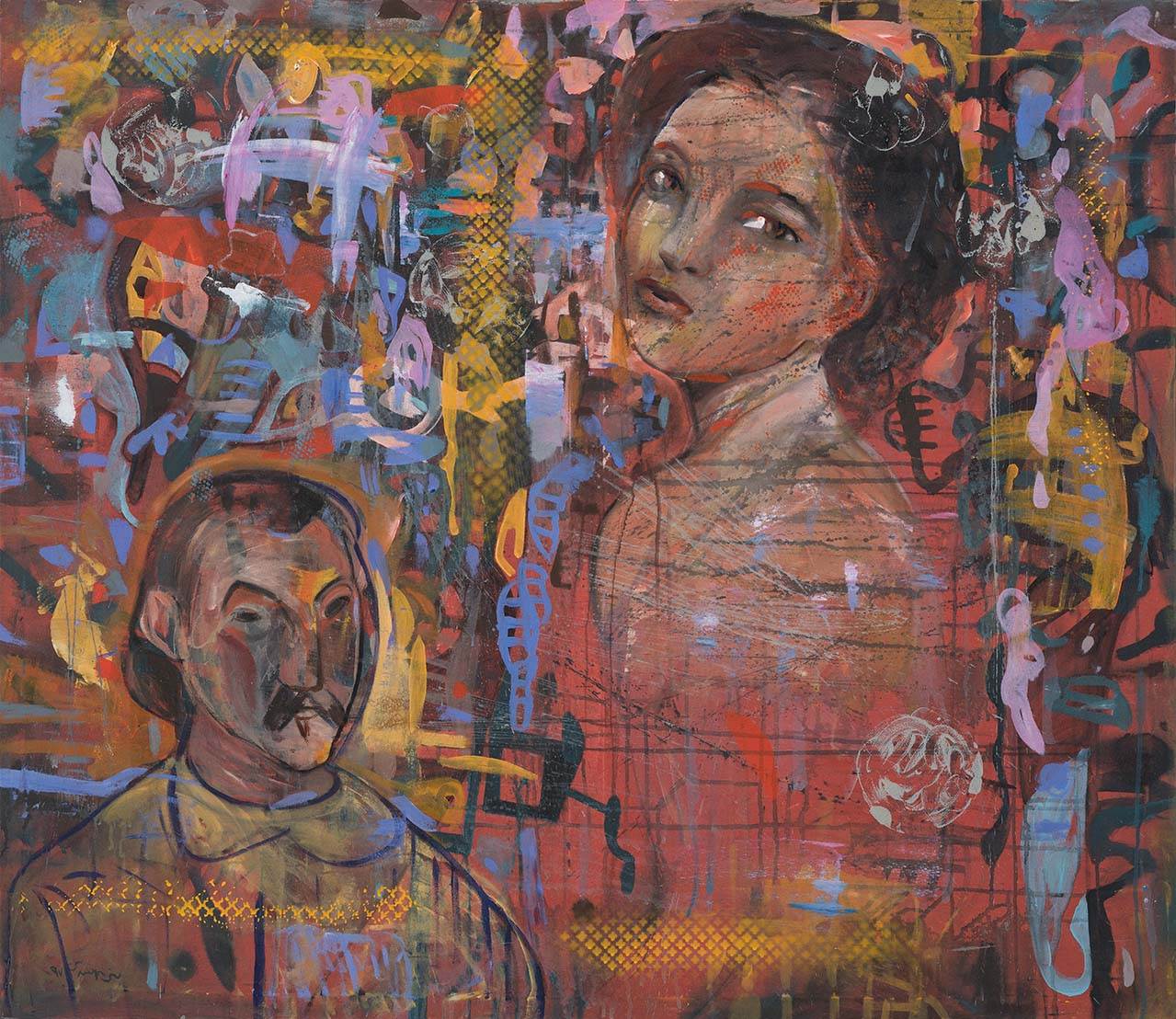
Mohammad Ali Baniasadi, Untitled, 2018. Bank Pasargad Museum of Contemporary Visual Arts.

Baniasadi's painting style has been constantly changing over the years. During the 80s and early 90s his paintings were very atmospheric and poetic, mostly creating a mysterious and nostalgic mood reminding the stories of One Thousand and One Nights the book he later illustrated three times. They often have an old Iranian cities architecture scenery in background. During this era his paintings and illustrations were sharing many characteristics, but soon they started to go separate ways. His paintings became more abstract, the figures transformed into faceless and often genderless geometric shaped human bodies and animals and also words found their way into his works. His late 90s and early 2000s works show these compositions. Some of them still had abstracted versions of those architectures in earlier works, in form of segregated arches and vaults. In next series, word shapes and lines became the very main element, making the space, animals and some parts of human figures. In late 2000s while his paintings were becoming extremely abstract, some of his illustrative tone came back and the geometric shaped figures gave place to colored masses and drippings making the body of works around the hovering faces. Since 2010, the human portraits or body figures are the main subject and have become much more realistic and usually the abstract forms including developed words, lines and geometric shapes from previous periods and textures surrounds the figures. In very recent years he's been working on a series of paintings depicting people sleeping in refugee camps.

=== Illustration ===
For years, his main medium in illustration was watercolor and gouache and since the target audiences were children, the style was using colors vividly and transparent and many times having a tinted glass quality. One of the goals of his work was to use images and colors to help the healing process of Iranian children affected by revolution and the eight years long war. After years collages became a common part of his illustration style, and he practiced making the scenes with a mixture of drawing and collages since then. He used to print his drawings, cut and set them together again and again to reach the final composition. This method continued using digital equipment in next decades.

=== Sculptures ===
He started making sculptures from early 2000s with common trash like empty bottles, dolls, polystyrene packaging, wooden parts from discarded furniture and papier-mâché. The subject of first period of these sculptures are mostly hybrid creatures and in next period he concentrated only on making life size human bodies using papier-mâché.

== See also ==
- Children's literature
- Persian art
