= Equestrian Statue of Naser al-Din Shah =

19th century statue of the Shah of Iran

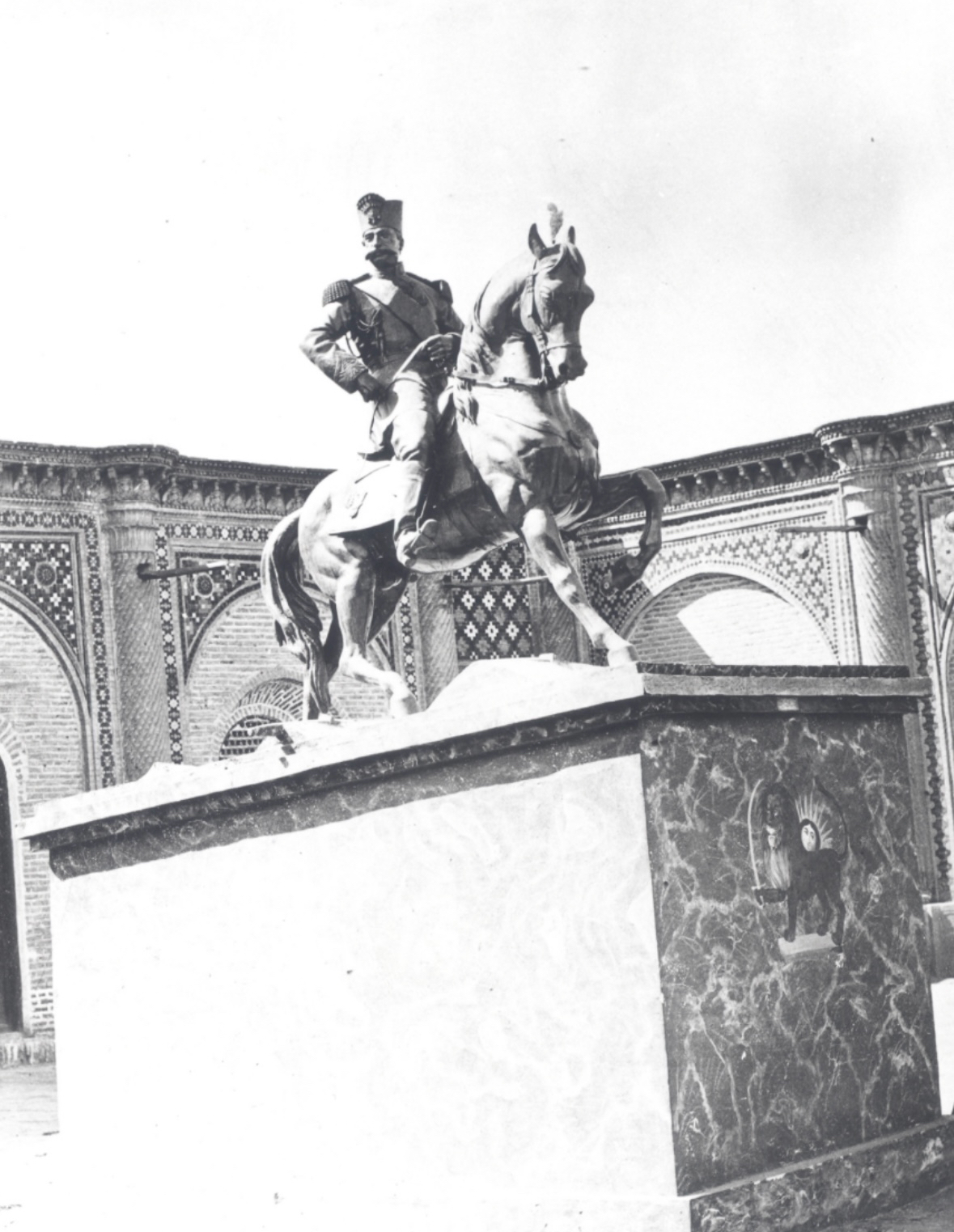
- The statue in a depot in Tehran, 1898
- Year: 1888

The Equestrian Statue of Naser al-Din Shah (Persian: تندیس سوارکاری ناصرالدین‌شاه) was a Bronze statue designed by Iranian sculptor Mirza Ali Akbar. The statue, depicting Naser al-Din Shah Qajar on horseback, was inaugurated in 1888 and commissioned by the director of the Iranian Royal Arsenal for both the 40th anniversary of his personal rule and the one-hundredth anniversary of Qajar dynasty rule over Iran in general. The Statue was initially designed for Tehran's Toopkhaneh Square, but was eventually placed in the gardens of Bagh-e Shah.

The statue was placed on a Red Verona marble pedestral, on which a Persian version of Augustus's Res Gestae was scripted. Naser al-Din Shah was styled "Imperator" of all countries of Greater Iran. The text summarizes the works of progress, which the shah had performed in forty years of his ''glorious'' rule.

Iranian art historian Layla S. Diba stated the statue "became a hated symbol of Qajar rule and was subsequently torn down." After that, Reza Shah melted down the statue in 1928 and it is said to have been recycled again in metal for the arms industry.

== History ==
Background

In 1873, when visiting the Palace of Versailles and the Louvre in France in 1873, Naser al-Din Shah showed much interest for western statues. In his diary, the shah wrote:

There were also some marble statues of Venus… one of which has been beautifully carved

— Naser al Din Shah Qajar, Carole Hillenbrand (intr.), The Diary of H. M. The Shah of Persia during his tour through Europe in A. D. 1873 (reprint Costa Mesa: Mazda, 1995), p. 246.

Naser al-Din Shah's interest in commissioning a bronze statue of himself began in 1882 when Antonio, Conte di Monteforte, the Italian-born chief of the National police force of Iran, placed a bronze bust of the shah on Laleh-Zar Street. The shah, however, was not pleased with the location on which Conte di Monteforte had placed the sculpture. After the bust was ordered to be placed on a tall column, the shah remained displeased. Thus later that year the shah commissioned the Iranian Royal Arsenal to make a more grandiose statue of himself.

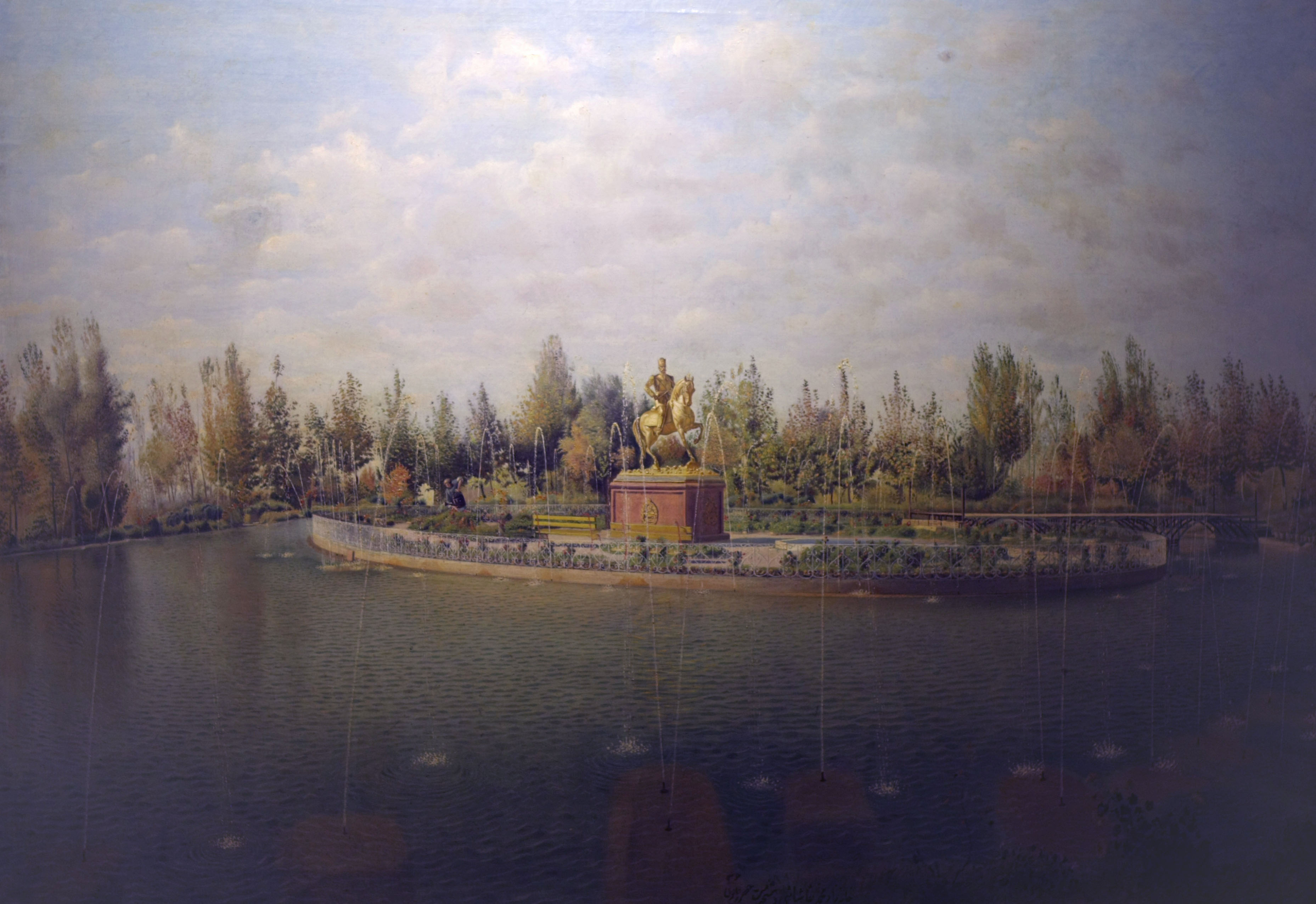
A painting of the statue in Bagh-e Shah, Kamal-ol-molk, 1888
