= Heydar Ali (19th century) =

Iranian laquer painter (19th century)

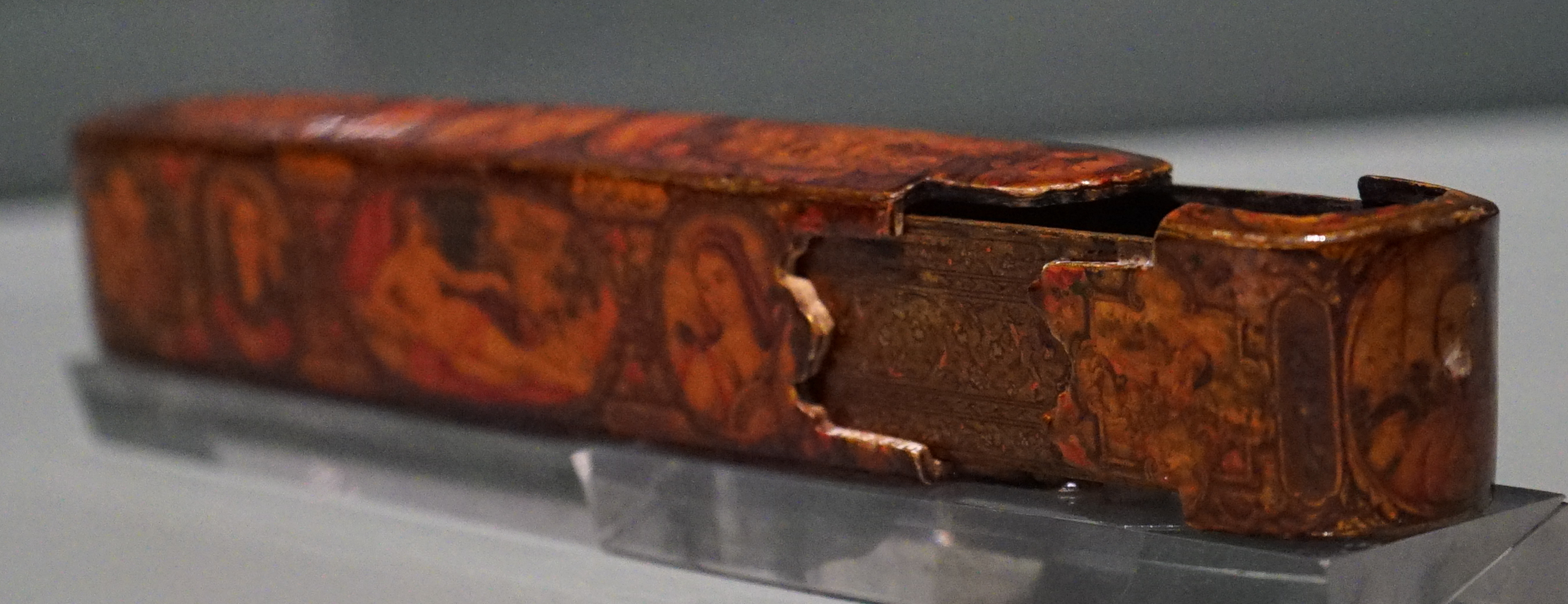
A penbox signed by Heydar Ali, dated 1866

Heydar Ali (Persian: حیدر علی) was a painter in Qajar Iran during the 19th century. Most of his surviving works were created between 1862–1885.

The majority of his works were lacquer paintings, except one minakari painting. His art style was similar to that of Agha Najaf Ali and his followers.

== Sources ==
- Eftekhar, Fariba (2019). "حیدرعلی". Center for the Great Islamic Encyclopedia (in Persian).
