= Shahed University =

Public university in Tehran, Iran

Coordinates: 35.552°N 51.347°E

- دانشگاه شاهد; Dāneshgāh-e Shāhed
- Shahed University
- Type: Public research university
- Established: 1990
- Academic affiliations: SCCR; MSRT; MOHME
- Chancellor: Hamidreza Bakhshi
- Academic staff: ~425 Full-time
- Administrative staff: ~3,500
- Students: ~6,000
- Location: Tehran, Iran
- Campus: suburban
- Colors: Green and Red
- Website: www.shahed.ac.ir

Shahed University (Persian: دانشگاه شاهد) is a public research university in Tehran, Iran. The campus is located in the southern part of Tehran along the Persian Gulf Freeway. Founded in 1990, the university started its activities by accepting 165 students in seven disciplines in 1991. It now has 6,000 students enrolled in more than 100 programs, 11 faculties, and 11 research institutions.

== Campus and student life ==
The campus hosts headquarters offices, women's dormitories, a central library and faculties of humanities, engineering, sciences and agriculture. Its medical colleges and training hospitals, the Art college, the Nursing and Midwifery Faculty, the Dental college and research centers are in the Central Tehran. Mostafa Khomeini Hospital (in the city center) is under Shahed university supervision (Faculty of Medicine).

== Ranking ==
Shahed University world rank is 741 in 2020 by SCImago Institutions Rankings and was 2160 in 2016 by Webometrics.

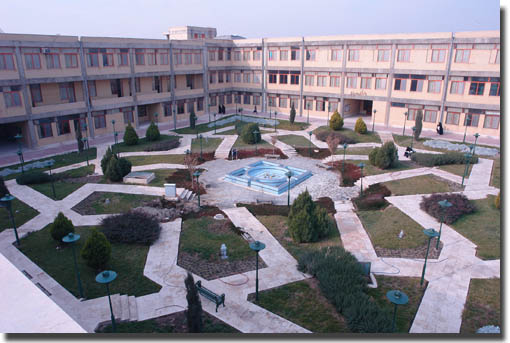
Overview of Management College

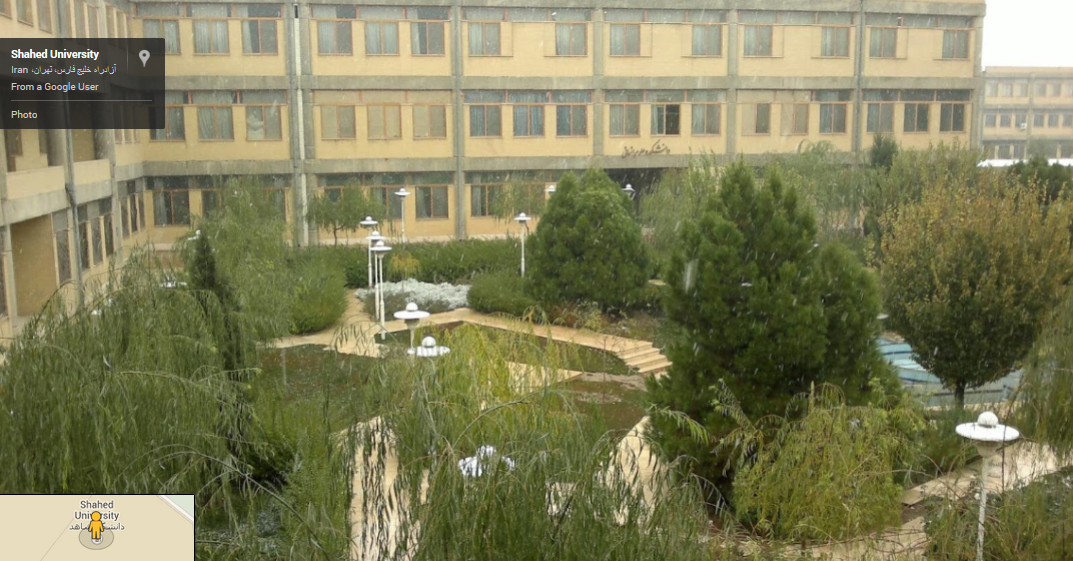
Management College

== Colleges ==
- College of Agriculture
- College of Engineering
- College of Science
- College of Human Sciences
- College of Medicine
- College of Dentistry
- College of Art
- College of Nursing and Midwifery

=== College of Human Sciences ===
The Faculty of Humanities was established in 1990 and currently has 85 full-time faculty members and 21 staff in 15 departments (12 specialized departments and 3 general departments) in 12 undergraduate and 12 graduate courses.

=== College of Agricultural Sciences ===
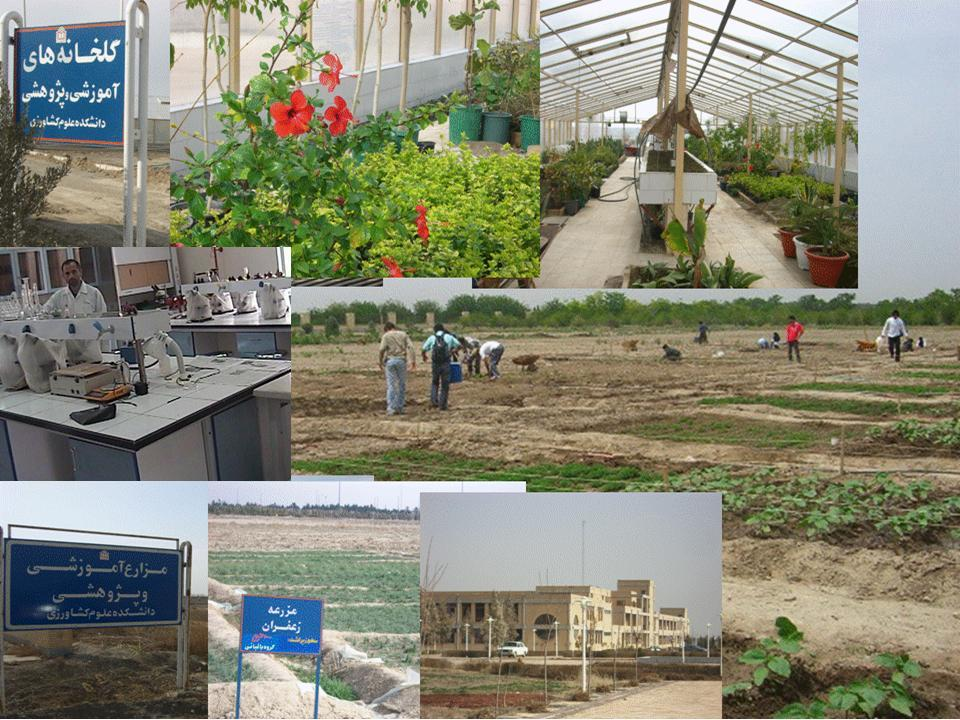
Experimental field provided for Agriculture students

The College of Agriculture Science at Shahed University ranks in the top best three colleges of agriculture in Iran.

- Majors offered for Bachelor students (BSc): Soil Science - Horticultural Science - Agronomy and Plant Science - Medical Plant Science
- Majors offered for Master students (MSc): Pedology - Soil chemical Science - Soil Physics Science - Entomology - Plant Disease Science

=== College of Engineering ===
Every year research papers including ISI journals are published by students and professors. Many graduates of this college have opportunities to continue their education in high level universities in developed countries.

- Biomedical Engineering (up to PhD)
- Electrical Engineering (four majors: Electronic, Communications and Power (all up to PhD) and Control (up to Msc)
- Civil Engineering (Bsc and Geotechnical Engineering (MSc) and Structure Engineering (MSc))
- Industrial Engineering (MSc and PhD)
- Computer Engineering and Information Technology (Up to Ph.D.)

==== College of Engineering events ====
- 14th Iranian Conference on Biomedical Engineering
- 16th Iranian Conference on Electrical Engineering

=== Engineering Research and Technology Center ===
Shahed University has a center for engineering research and technology in Enghelab square in Tehran.

=== College of Fundamental Sciences ===
Department of Biology at Shahed University has the top place in biology in Iran and has recently been recognized as a privileged group in the country.

=== College of Medicine ===
Shahed University College of Dentistry is at Karegare Shomali Nosrat Avenue no 115 in Tehran. The medical centers, educational and medical Mostafa Khomeini is a hospital in central Tehran. Mostafa Khomeini hospital has 220 beds and is under the supervision of the Medical School of Shahed University.

== Publications ==
=== English journals ===
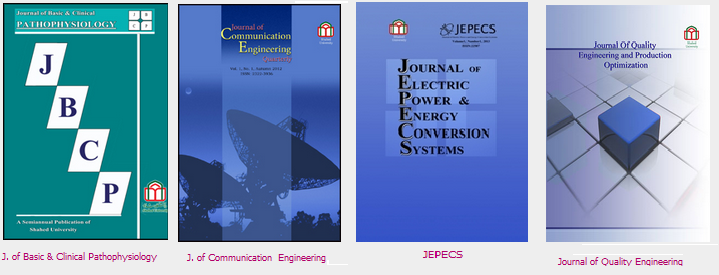
Shahed University English journals

- International Panacea Journal of Engineering and Technology
- Journal of Basic & Clinical Psychopathology
- Journal of Communication Engineering
- Journal of Electric Power & Energy Conversion Systems
- Journal of Quality Engineering and Production Optimization

=== Persian journals ===
- دانشور پزشكي Scope: Medicinal Sciences
- روانشناسی بالینی و شخصیت Scope: Clinical Psychology & Personality
- راهبردهای بازرگانی Scope: Commercial Strategies
- مطالعات اسلام Scope: Islam Related Studies
- پژوهش نامه علم سنجی Scope: Educational Progress Rating
- اخلاق و فرهنگ در پرستاری و مامائی Accepts papers in English as wellScope: Ethics & Culture in Nursing and Midwifery
- دانش زراعت Scope: Agronomy Sciences
- پژوهش های آموزش و یادگیری Scope: Training and Learning Researches
- نگاره Accepts papers in English as well Scope: Art
- ادبیات مقاومت Scope: Resistance Literature
