= Abbas Rassam Arjangi =

Iranian painter

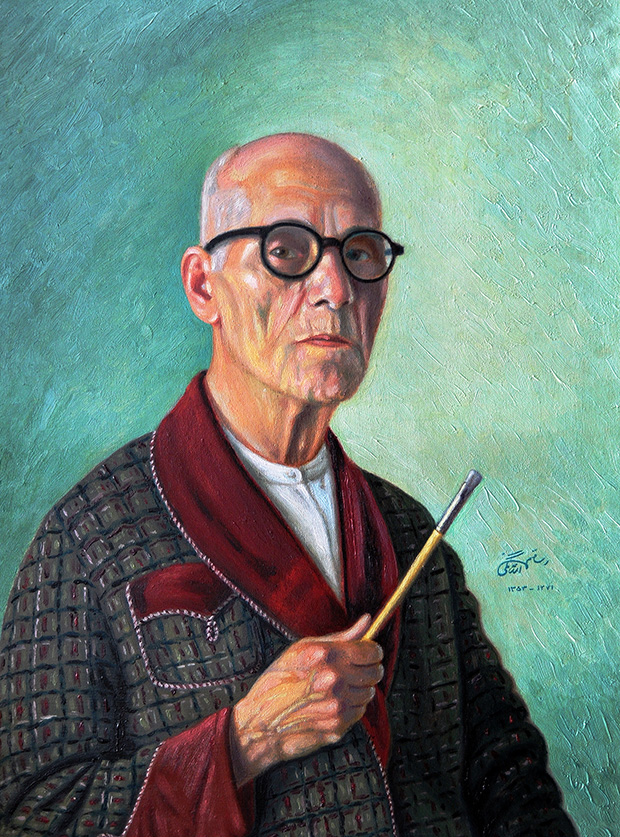
- Self-portrait by Abbas Rassam Arjangi, dated 1974
- Born: 1892; Tabriz, Qajar Iran
- Died: 1975 (aged 82–83); Pahlavi Iran
- Family: Agha Ebrahim (father); Mir Hossein Arjangi (brother); Farhad Arjangi (son)

Abbas Rassam Arjangi (also spelled Arzhangi; Persian: عباس رسام ارژنگی; 1892–1975) was an Iranian painter, notable for combining European and Iranian elements in his work. A native of Tabriz, he was the son of Agha Ebrahim, a court painter under Mozaffar ad-Din Shah Qajar (r. 1896–1907), and had an older brother named Mir Hossein Arjangi. "Arjangi" was a surname the two brothers later adopted, based on the Arzhang, the illustrated book of Mani, the 3rd-century founder of Manichaeism, whom they considered the legendary founder of Iranian painting. In 1903, Abbas Rassam and Mir Hossein relocated to the Russian Empire, staying in the city of Tiflis. Another Iranian artist, Hossein Taherzadeh Behzad, seemingly stayed in Tiflis around the same time and, along with Abbas Rassam, was likely part of the same group of Iranian émigrés. After 1908, the two brothers moved to Moscow, but had moved back to Iran by 1914 due to World War I. The standard Iranian manuscript illustration style that Abbas Rassam made during his early career in Tiflis remained consistent throughout his later career. For the next fifty years, and without the support of the government, he produced a large amount of paintings in different styles in Tabriz and Tehran. Although Abbas Rassam's political views are unclear, the absence of support from the Pahlavi court might offer some indication.

Possibly due to their political views, Abbas Rassam and Mir Hossein have not been given much credit for their contributions to the history of modern Iranian art. Abbas Rassam had a son named Farhad Arjangi, a painter, tar player, and composer.

== Gallery ==
Examples of Abbas Rassam Arjangi's work

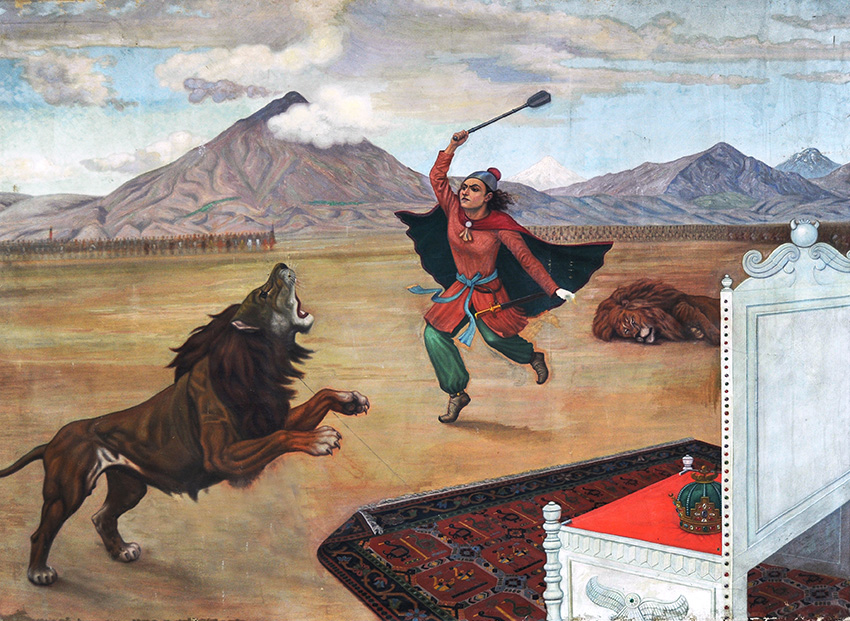
The 5th-century Sasanian prince Bahram V fighting for the crown of the kingdom

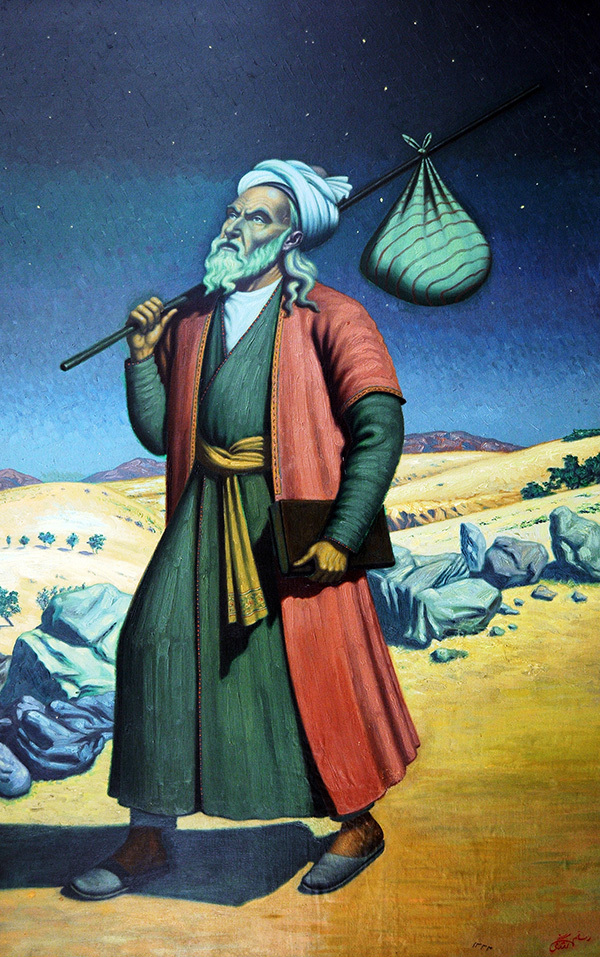
The medieval Persian poet Ferdowsi leaving Ghazni

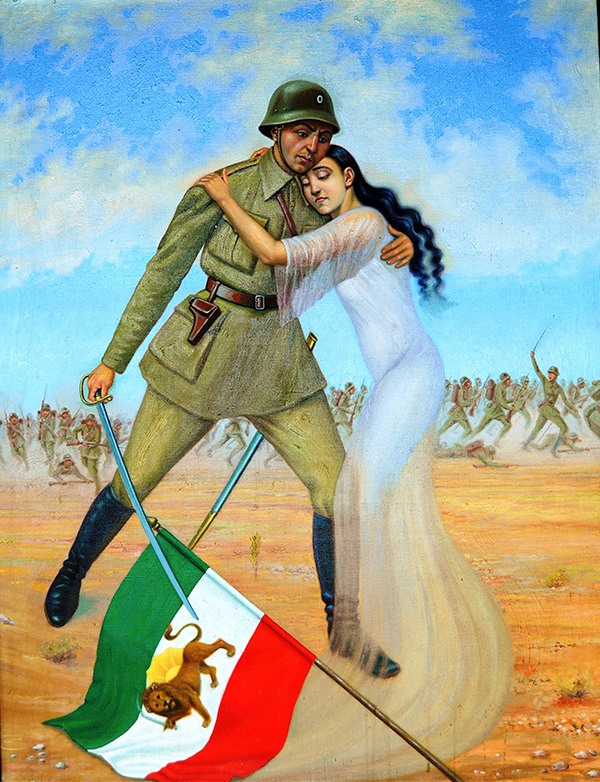
Commemoration of the Iranian army retaking the Azerbaijan region from the secessionist Azerbaijan People's Government

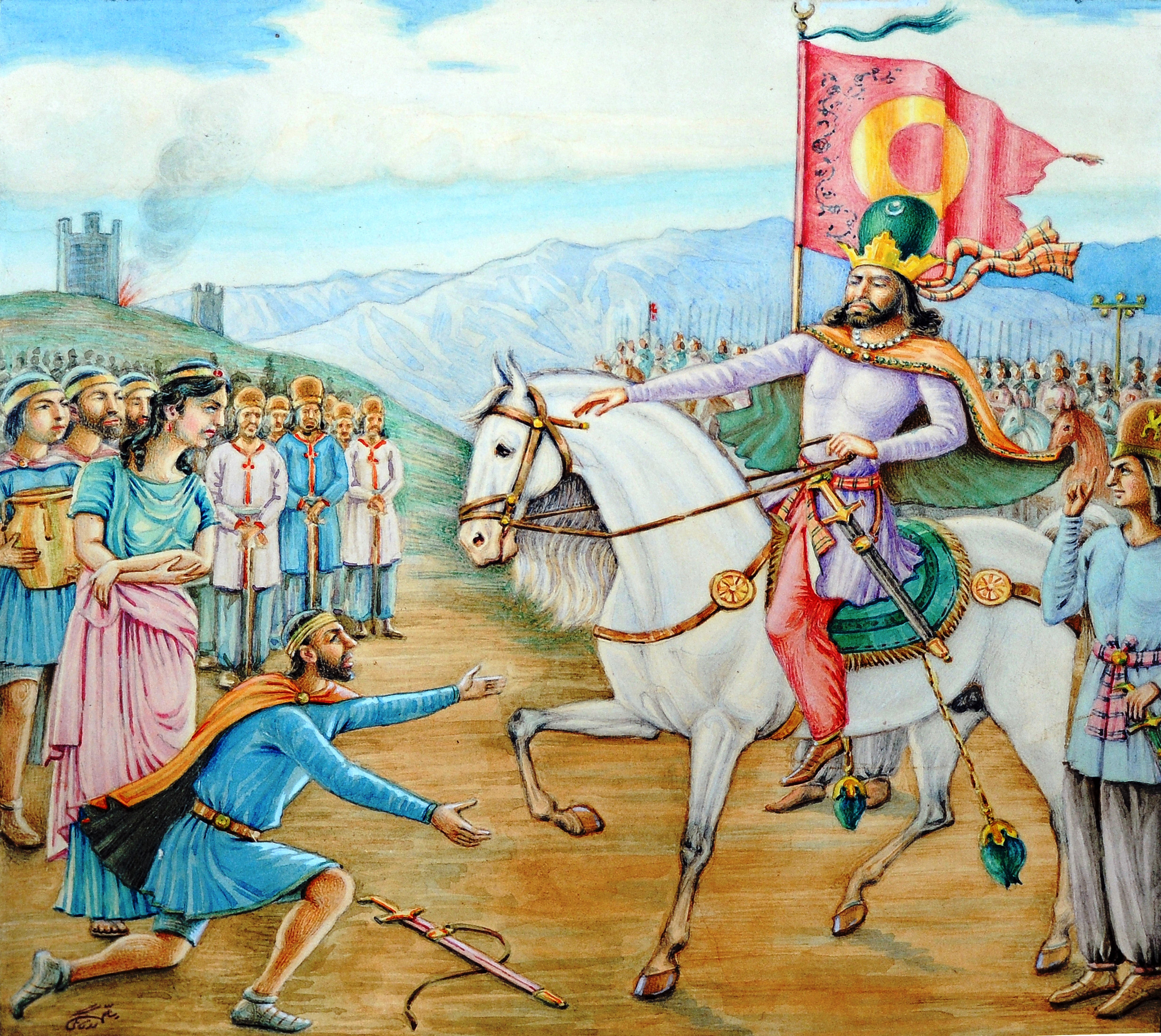
Painting inspired by the Shapur I's victory relief at Naqsh-e Rostam

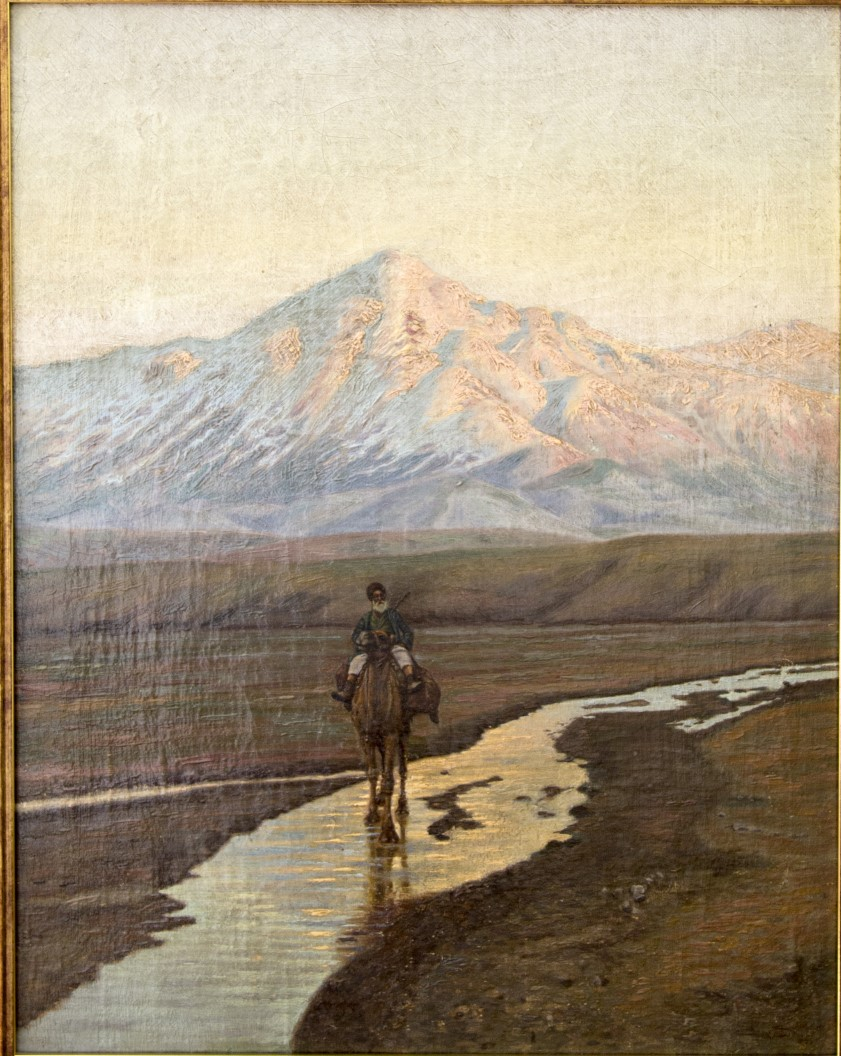
A man on horseback in Vanak, Hormozgan

== Sources ==
- Adinehvand, Fahimeh Khosravi (2023). "ارژنگی". The Great Islamic Encyclopaedia (in Persian).
- Diba, Layla S. (2025). "Border Crossings: Iranian Artists in Tsarist Russia and Georgia". In Amanat, Abbas; Gledhill, Kevin; Nejad, Kayhan A. (eds.). The Caspian World: Connections and Contentions at a Modern Eurasian Crossroads. Cornell University Press. pp. 247–268. ISBN 978-1501781292.
- Rahimi, Babak (2021). Performing Iran: Culture, Performance, Theatre. I.B. Tauris. ISBN 978-1784535612.
