= Jean-Marc Decrop =

French art collector (born 1955)

Jean-Marc Decrop (born 1955) is a French art collector. He is a specialist of Chinese contemporary art. He is one among the art collectors who have contributed to the discovery, the recognition and the influence of Chinese contemporary art abroad.

== Biography ==
Jean-Marc Decrop was born in 1955 in France. Passionnate about art, but convinced that management is also important in culture, he studies management (ESCP Promo 1978 Harvard PMD 1987), taking responsibility of the cultural committee of his school. He starts his career as cultural attaché at the French Embassy of Asunción in Paraguay but quickly moves to Asia where, as an expatriate in Japan (1982–1987) on his free time from business, he organizes several exhibitions (contemporary Japanese sculpture and photography).

He discovers Chinese Contemporary Art in 1992, starts his collection, sets up as a resident in Hong Kong in 1993 and deepens his knowledge with Chinese avant-garde. In November 2001, he is appointed expert at the French National Chamber of Experts CNES for Chinese contemporary art. He becomes then the first European expert certified in that specialty.

Influenced by his relationship with Hans van Dijck (co-founder with Ai Weiwei of the gallery CAAW in Beijing), he is also at that time a partner with Johnson Chang for the gallery Hanart Taipei, of which he is a 25% shareholder during 1995–2000.

Partner and artistic advisor of Paris Galerie Loft from 1999 to 2007, he produces as a forerunner several pioneering monographic exhibitions of major Chinese contemporary artists:

- Zhao Bandi and Zhou Tiehai (November 1999)
- Sui Jianguo and Zhan Wang (July 2000)
- Bo Hai (May 2001)
- Liu Wei (June 2001 and February 2005)
- Yang Shaobin (October 2001)
- Liu Xiaodong (November 2001 and June 2005)
- Wang Qingsong (March 2002 and April 2004)
- Rong Rong (May 2002 and September 2003)
- Yan Lei (October 2002 and October 2003)
- Zheng Hao (May 2003)
- Qiu Zhijie (June 2003 and December 2005)
- Zheng Guogu (April 2005)
- Hong Yu (May 2006)
- Guo Wei (June 2000 and October 2006)
- Lin Tianmiao (December 2006 and June 2007)
- Qiu Xiaofei (March 2007)

Meanwhile, he also curates non-commercial shows at 11 museums or foundations for which he writes catalogue essays, among which :

- Champs de la sculpture, Paris, 1999
- Futuro, CACOM Contemporary Art Center of Macao Foundation Oriente, China, 2000
- China, FAAP Museum of the University of São Paulo, Video (4 min):, Brazil, 2002
- Paris-Beijing, Espace Cardin, Paris, 2002
- Subvertion and Poetry, Culturgest Foundation, Lisbon 2003.

His actions progressively contribute to the recognition of Chinese art in Europe. Through his purchases as a collector and as a gallerist, he supports this movement and its artists . In 2001, he sells his personal collection of Figuration Narrative (Auction Poulain-Le Fur, Paris, February 2001, to devote its resources exclusively to Chinese art. His Chinese collection, rich in key works from the period 1985-1995 amounts then to some 500 artworks, placing it among the major collections in that field (Guy Ullens, David Tang, Uli Sigg). From an early stage, he tries to encourage French intellectuals and journalists to write about Chinese art by inviting them to tour workshops and artists studios in Beijing : Christine Buci-Glucksmann, Pierre Cornette de Saint Cyr, Michel Nuridsany (Le Figaro), Henri-François Debailleux Libération ).
He helps to build many European collections (collection Guy Ullens; collection Gillion-Crowet; collection of Flers; collection of Harold t'Kint Roodenbeke; collection Samir Sabet d'Acre and Florence Pucci; collection DSL Levy)

He organizes loans, via Galerie Loft of good Chinese artworks to international museums (from 1999 to 2006 more than 100 works loaned to 26 museums); writes many articles and essays; provides unremittingly information and photographs to european newspapers, magazines and media; collaborates with publishing houses for illustration of books and novels with Chinese artworks Bleu de Chine, Chine en poche, les Éditions de l'Olivier, Éditions Philippe Picquier).

== Bibliography ==
- China, Museum of the University of São Paulo Brazil FAAP, 2002 with Britta Erickson et al. Video (4 min): Video on YouTube
- Paris-Pekin Espace Cardin, Paris 2002 with Johnson Chang et al.
- Chinese Modernities, Skira publishers in 2003 with Christine Buci-Glucksman
- Red Flag: Liu Xiaodong Mapbook Publishers, 2006,
- Red Flag: Zheng Guogu Mapbook Publishers 2008, ,
- China: The New Generation, Skira publishers 2014, Jean-Marc Decrop and Jérôme Sans,

== Articles ==
- Fung Ming Chip catalog Taipei Fine Arts Museum 1998 "The Specific Case of Fung Ming Chip calligraphy" * Rong Rong catalog Casa Garden, Macau in September 2001 "3 aspects of Rong Rong's works"

== Filmography ==
CNN broadcasting of a film on the exhibition « Futuro », 2000 CACOM Macau Contemporary Art Centre, Macau, curator Jean-Marc Decrop guided tour and interview.
