= Heydar Ali (16th century) =

Safavid court painter (16th century)

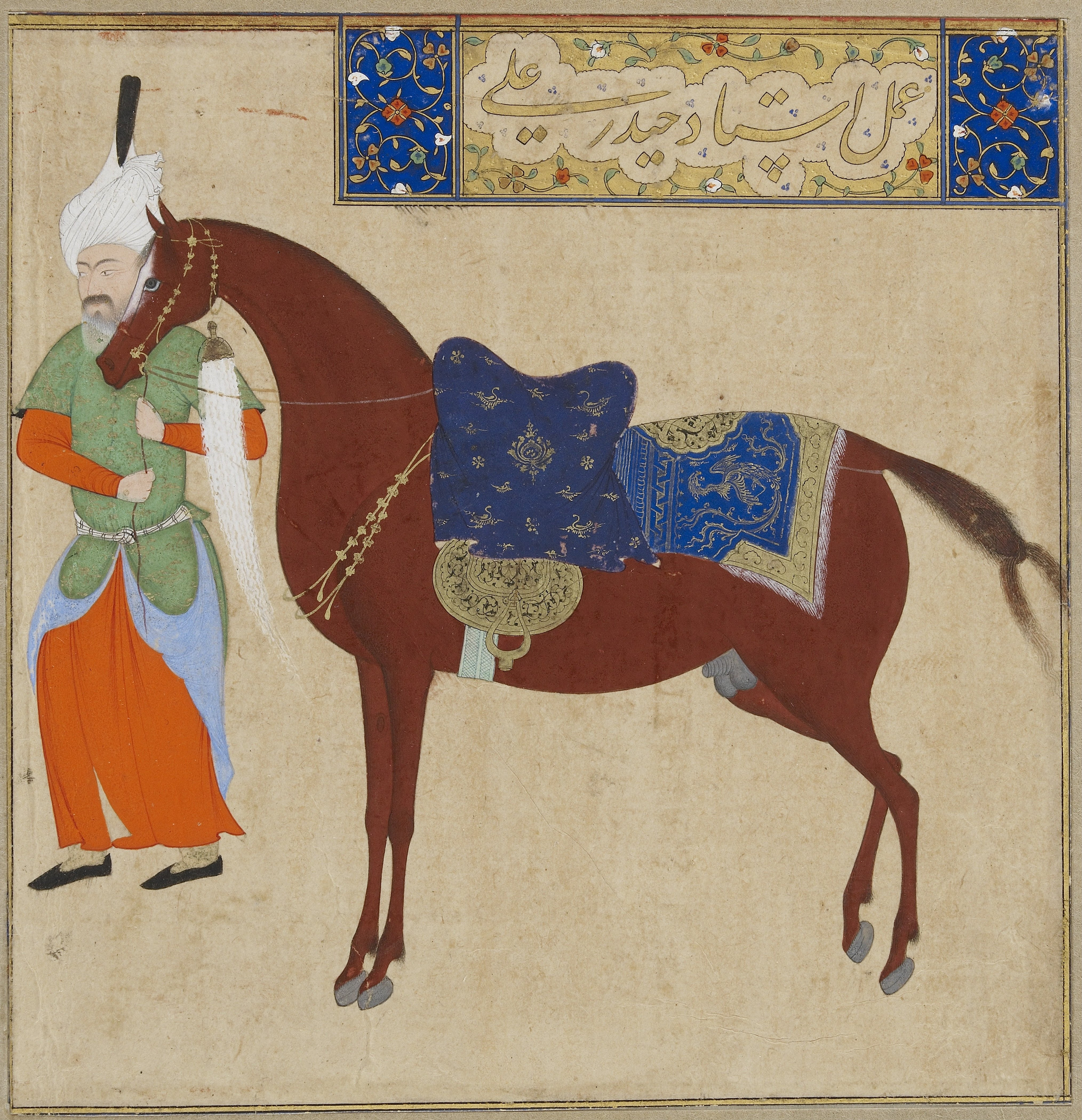
"Horse and Groom", by Heydar Ali, early 16th century

Heydar Ali (Persian: حیدر علی) was a painter in Safavid Iran during the 16th century. The majority of his career was spent at the court of Shah Tahmasp I (r. 1524–1576).

== Biography ==
Little information has survived about Heydar Ali. He was the father of the prominent painter Mozaffar Ali. He was likely a native of Torbat-e Jam, as he referred to as "Torbati" by Sadiqi Beg, who had studied under Mozaffar Ali. Sadiqi Beg also wrote that "[Mozaffar Ali] is the son of Heydar Ali, the nephew of Master Behzad". The way the Persian sentence was written, it is uncertain if Heydar Ali or Mozaffar Ali was a nephew of Behzad. The contemporary historian Budaq Monshi Qazvini wrote that Haydar Ali was a capable student of Behzad. It is known that Mozaffar Ali was a nephew of the prominent calligrapher Rostam Ali, who was himself a nephew of Behzad.

== Sources ==
- Eftekhar, Fariba (2019). "حیدرعلی". Center for the Great Islamic Encyclopedia (in Persian).
