= Agha Najaf Ali =

Iranian painter

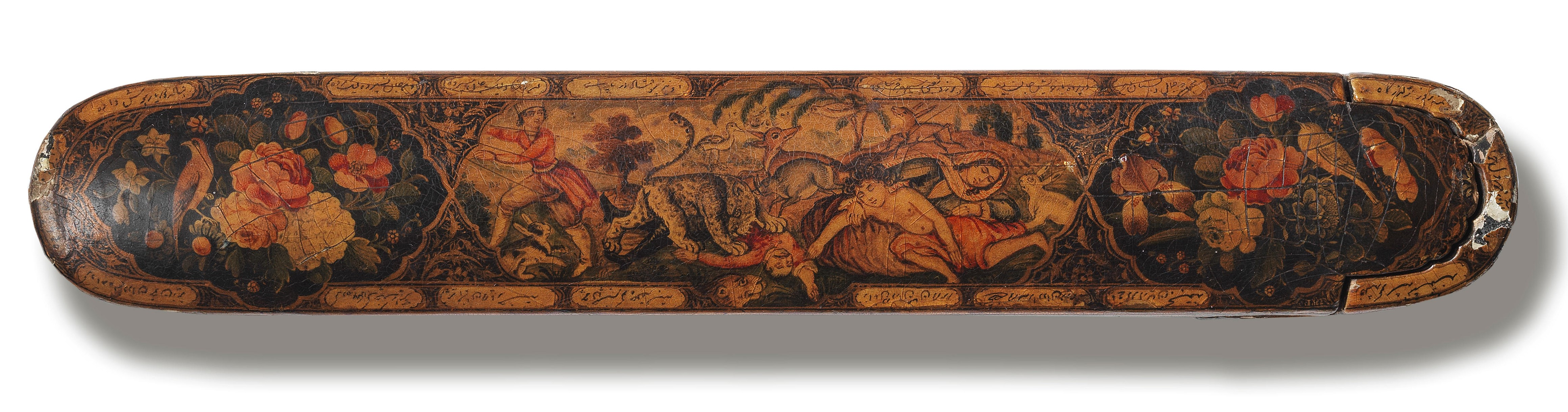
A lacquer penbox, signed by Agha Najaf Ali, depicting scenes from Layla and Majnun. Created in Qajar Iran, dated 1843 or 1844

Agha Najaf Ali (Persian: آقا نجف علی; fl. 1815 – c. 1860) was an Iranian painter from the Agha Najaf family of Isfahan.

Agha Najaf Ali studied under Ali Ashraf, a prominent painter who was known for his illustrations of flowers and birds. The signature yā shāh-i najaf ("O King of Najaf") appears on almost all of his work. It is a homage to Ali, who is buried in Najaf and was the son-in-law of the Islamic prophet Muhammad and considered by Shia Muslims to be the first Imam. Because his kids and students not only continued to paint in his style but also signed his name, Agha Najaf Ali's work is frequently difficult to identify, and paintings in several different styles are connected with his name.

Some authors claim that Agha Najaf Ali was the son of the Isfahani painter Mirza Baba, but this is dismissed by the Iranologist Willem Floor.

== Sources ==
- Bloom, Jonathan; Blair, Sheila (2009). "Isfahani". Grove Encyclopedia of Islamic Art & Architecture: Three-Volume Set. Oxford University Press. ISBN 978-0195309911.
- Floor, Willem (1999). "Art (Naqqashi) and Artists (Naqqashan) in Qajar Persia". Muqarnas. 13. Brill: 125–154. doi:10.2307/1523268. JSTOR 1523268. (registration required)
