= Amir Shayesteh Tabar =

Iranian artist (born 1967)

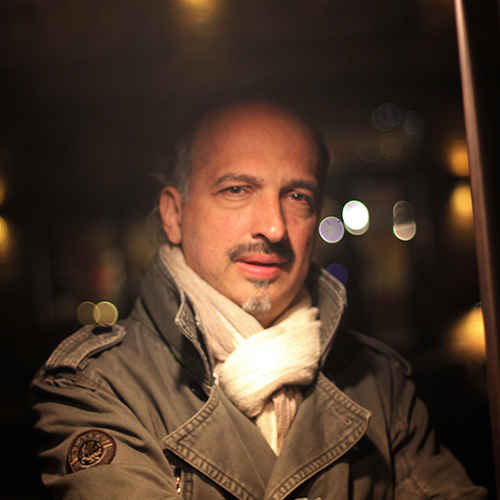
- Born: 7 April 1967 (age 59); Tehran, Iran
- Notable work: Blue Symphony, Violin, War and Peace, Silence of the Universe
- Movement: Peace Tour By Blue Symphony
- Awards: "Lorenzo il Magnifico" award from Florence Biennale 2009

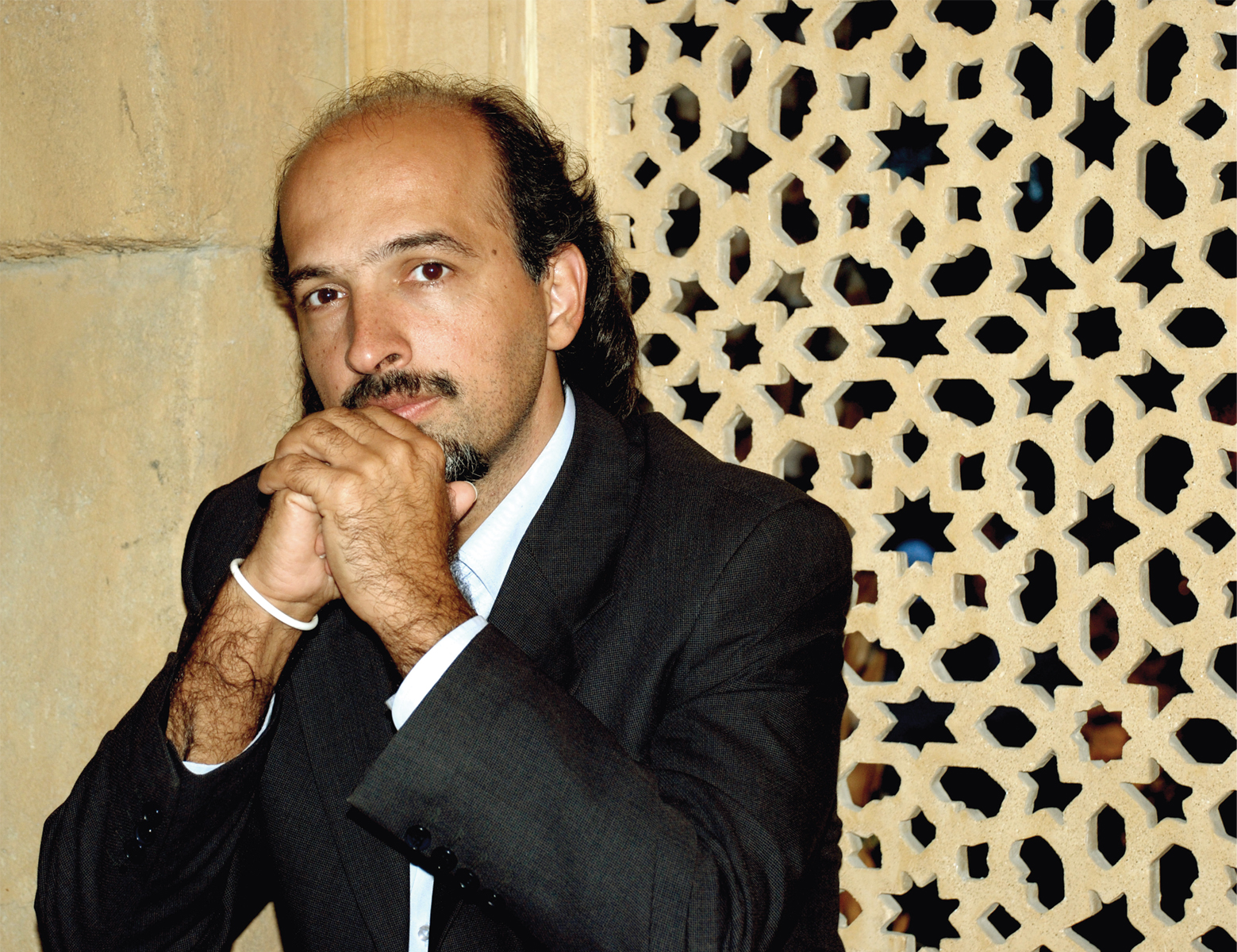
Amir Shayesteh Tabar in 2007

Amir Shayesteh Tabar (Persian: امیر شایسته تبار; born 7 April 1967) is an Iranian artist, painter, poet, and filmmaker. Tabar is best known for "The Blue Symphony", a collection of computer graphic artworks that use the words of the Basmala, بسم الله الرحمن الرحيم (translated as "In the name of God, the most graceful, the most merciful") to create geometric patterns. Beginning in the 1990s, Shayesteh Tabar spent more than 16 years on the completion of "The Blue Symphony" and four years for the calibration of the colours alone.

On 30 September 2022, it was announced by the curatorial committee of Florence Biennale that the motto for the 14th edition, which took place in Florence, Italy, from 14 to 22 October 2023, would be "I am You - Individual and Collective Identities in Contemporary Art and Design" and that the event would be in large part dedicated to the struggle of Iranian women for their rights. On this occasion, Florence Biennale signed an international petition initiated by Shayesteh Tabar, calling for an increased engagement on behalf of the global community of artists to support the cause of the Iranian people as "true artists" and to become the "voice of those who are left without any help".

== Early life ==
Shayesteh Tabar is a Persian Iranian, born on 7 April 1967, in Tehran. His parents were originally from Tabriz, but moved to Tehran during the Second World War. His father was a merchant working as a wholesaler at the food market. Shayesteh Tabar received a BA degree in Industrial Management from Allameh Tabataba'i University in Tehran. During his time as a student he dedicated more of his time to studying and practicing arts, including photography, poetry, calligraphy and history of arts, than to his university subjects. He went on to attend painting classes offered by Iranian masters Ruyin Pakbaz, Bahram Kha'ef, and Mehrdad Moheb-Ali, but stuck to his decision to continue working as a self-taught artist.

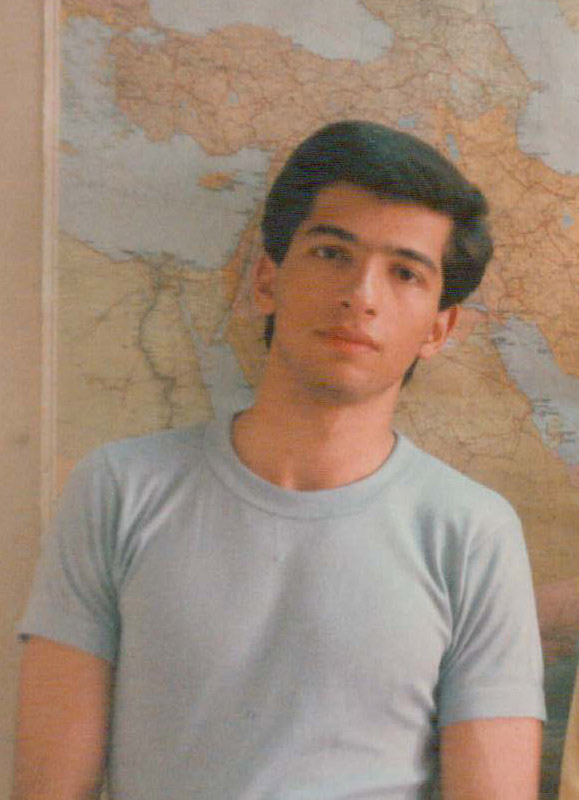
Amir Shayesteh Tabar as a young man in 1982

During his time of studying of Islamic art, he realized that after the Islamic Golden Age, most of the Islamic designs created around the world began to follow the same patterns and outlines, continuing for centuries. This eventually fueled to his desire to become a source of innovation in the field of Islamic Arts.

== Artistic features ==
Shayesteh Tabar uses specific religious phrases of the Quran, written in the Perso-Arabic script, Nastaligh, to form intricate geometrical patterns and an illusion of dimension through color. Other cultural influences of Shayesteh Tabar can be traced back to traditional art from India, Morocco, and the Baroque period of Western Europe.

Shayesteh Tabar has been an early advocate for the digitization of the arts by pointing out the advantages digital artworks have over their physical counterparts, namely their accessibility, transportability, indestructibility, scalability and verifiability through the use of digital storage tools and the recent blockchain technology.

Shayesteh Tabar describes it as his "dream to see these patterns used for cityscapes, buildings, mosques, interiors, jewelry, fashion garments, carpets, and other objects. "For the Islamic world, this is about reaffirming our identity, bringing children in touch with our rich artistic history, and absorbing fine art in life to create beauty and harmony outside and within".

== Exhibitions ==
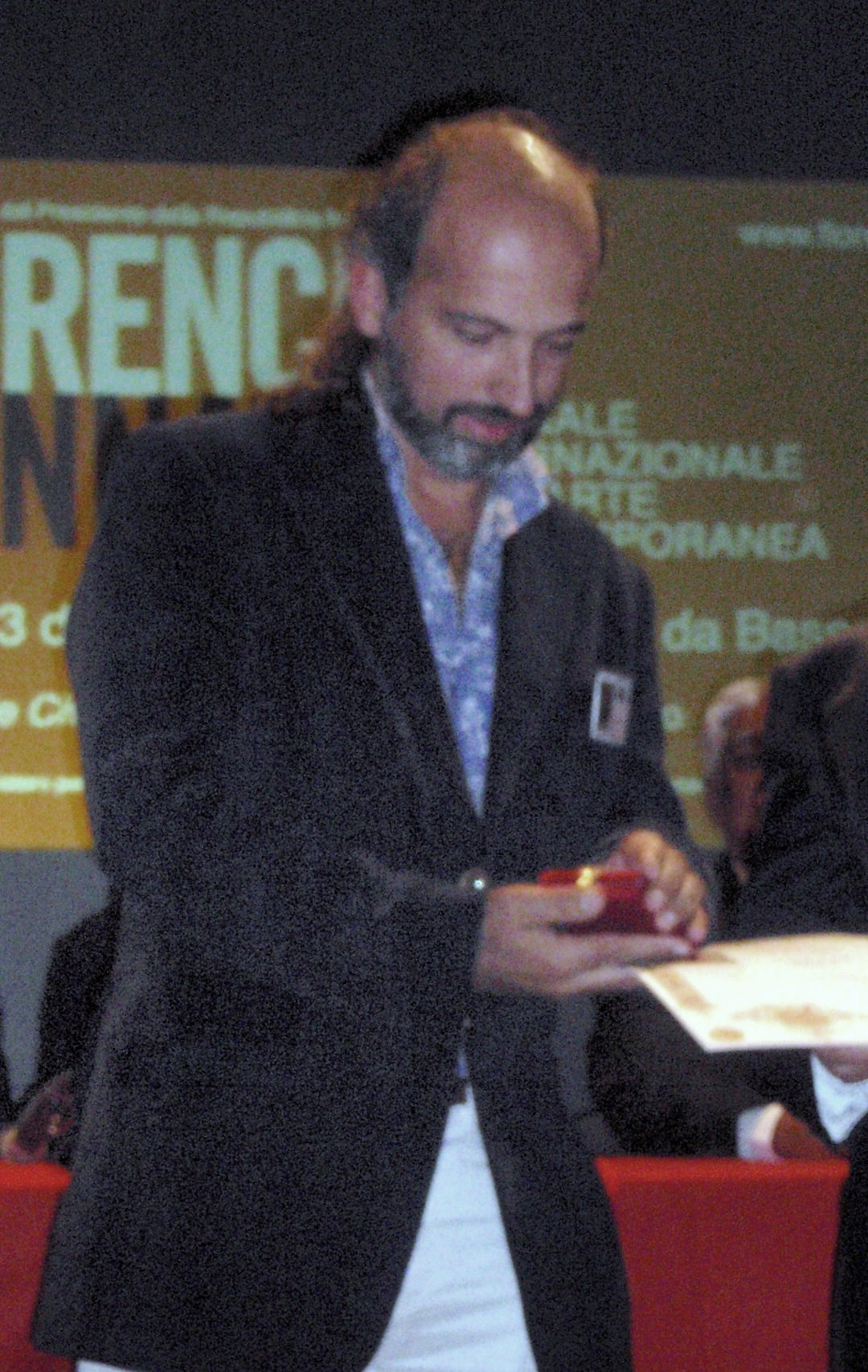
Amir Shayesteh Tabar receiving the President's Award at Florence Biennale on 13 December 2009

Shayesteh Tabar held several solo exhibitions in various countries around the world and was awarded the President's Award "Lorenzo Il Magnifico" at the 2009 Florence Biennale for his unique approach and contribution to the arts with his Blue Symphony collection.
