= Mohsen Vaziri-Moghaddam =

Iranian painter and professor (1924–2018)

Mohsen Vaziri Moghaddam
- محسن وزیری مقدم
- Born: 27 July 1924; Tehran, Qajar Iran
- Died: 7 September 2018 (aged 94); Rome, Italy
- Resting place: Rome's Non-Catholic Cemetery
- Education: Faculty of Fine Arts, Tehran; Academy of Fine Arts, Rome
- Known for: Painter, sculptor and educator
- Style: Informal art, abstract art, op art, interactive art
- Movement: Modern abstract art

Mohsen Vaziri Moghaddam (Persian: محسن وزیری مقدم; 27 July 1924 – 7 September 2018) was an Iranian-born painter, sculptor, and a professor of art. He was most notable for his style of abstract expressionism, and was once referred to as the "pioneer of modern Iranian abstraction".

== Life and education ==
Mohsen Vaziri was born on 27 July 1924 in Tehran, Qajar Iran.

Shortly after obtaining his diploma at the Agricultural Institute in 1943, he applied to the Faculty of Fine Arts at Tehran University (now University of Tehran). He attended for three years.

== Career ==
In 1952, his first solo exhibition was held at the Iran-America Society in Tehran.

From 1955 to 1958, Vaziri studied at the Academy of Fine Arts in Rome.

Vaziri shared an artistic vision with now internationally-known artists who also attended Scialoja’s course, notably Pino Pascali, Jannis Kounellis, Mohamed Melehi, Maria Pioppi, and Mario Ceroli.

His first abstract works were produced between 1956 and 1959. Through 1959 and 1960, he developed a vision of abstract art through experiments highly focused on materials. This led to the creation of the sand paintings, where different types of sand were applied to a canvas in their natural state or mixed with colorants. His original concept grabbed the attention of Italian art critic Giulio Carlo Argan and Palma Bucarelli, director of the Galleria Nazionale d'Arte Moderna.

After a long period in Italy, he returned to Iran, where he taught at the Faculty of Decorative Arts and the Faculty of Fine Arts in Tehran until 1978. In those years, he wrote two art methodology textbooks: Drawing method vol. 1 (1974) and Drawing method vol. 2 (1981). He translated several art books on Paul Klee, German Expressionism, Venetian craftsmanship and 20th century painting from English, French and Italian into Persian.

In 1965, Vaziri's Untitled (1962) by was acquired by the Museum of Modern Art in New York.

In 1985, Vaziri returned to Rome with his wife and two children.

In the 1990s, Vaziri explored Persian calligraphy shapes, emphasizing the minimalism of line. He continued to test himself with abstract compositions distinct from one another and characterized by either highly defined shapes and intense colors or vague silhouettes and soft pastel colors.

In 1999 his Persian translation of The Mind and Work of Paul Klee by W. Hahtmann was published; he resumed contact with Iranian universities and held several lectures.

In 2003 Vaziri was affected by an eye disease that would considerably reduce his eyesight. Despite this, he resumed one of his techniques from the end of the 1950s, using large splashes of color that reflected his way of seeing reality.

In 2017, the Mohsen Vaziri Moghaddam Foundation was created in Rome following the wish of the artist and his sons to archive Vaziri's work and legacy. The Foundation organized its first event in the industrial area of Ex Dogana in Rome, where Vaziri made a large-size sand artwork across 20 canvases.

His works are held in the public collections of museums by the Museum of Modern Art, the Parviz Tanavoli Museum, and the Tehran Museum of Contemporary Art.

== Notable exhibitions ==
- 1952: (debut solo exhibition), Iran-America Society, Tehran
- 1956: Portonovo Art Gallery, Rome
- 1958: Venice Biennial
- 1960: Tehran Biennial
- 1960 Venice Biennial (1958, 1960, 1962, 1964)
- 1950: Rome Quadriennale
- 1962: Tehran Biennial
- 1962: Venice Biennial (1958, 1960, 1962, 1964)
- 1962: São Paulo Biennial, Brazil (1962)
- 1963: (group exhibition), São Paulo Biennial, Brazil
- 1964: Museum of Modern Art, New York
- 1964: Venice Biennial
- 1969: Shiraz Arts Festival, Iran
- 2004: Contemporary Art Museum, Tehran (with Gerhard Richter)
- 2009: Pioneers of Modern Iranian Art, Tehran
- 2011: Pioneers of Modern Iranian Art, Tehran
- 2013: Iran Modern Exhibition (group exhibition; first major exhibition of post-war Iranian art)
- 2014: Artevida Corpo (travelling exhibition at venues throughout Rio de Janeiro), Fundação Casa França-Brasil, Rio de Janeiro, Brazil
- 2018: Mohsen Vaziri Moghaddam: The Iranian Pioneer of Modern Abstraction, Setareh Gallery, Duselldorf
- 2018: Modernism in Iran: 1958–1978, (group exhibition)

== See also ==
- Islamic art
- Iranian art
- List of Iranian artists
- List of Iranian painters
