= Shaheen Merali =

Tanzanian artist, writer and critic (born 1959)

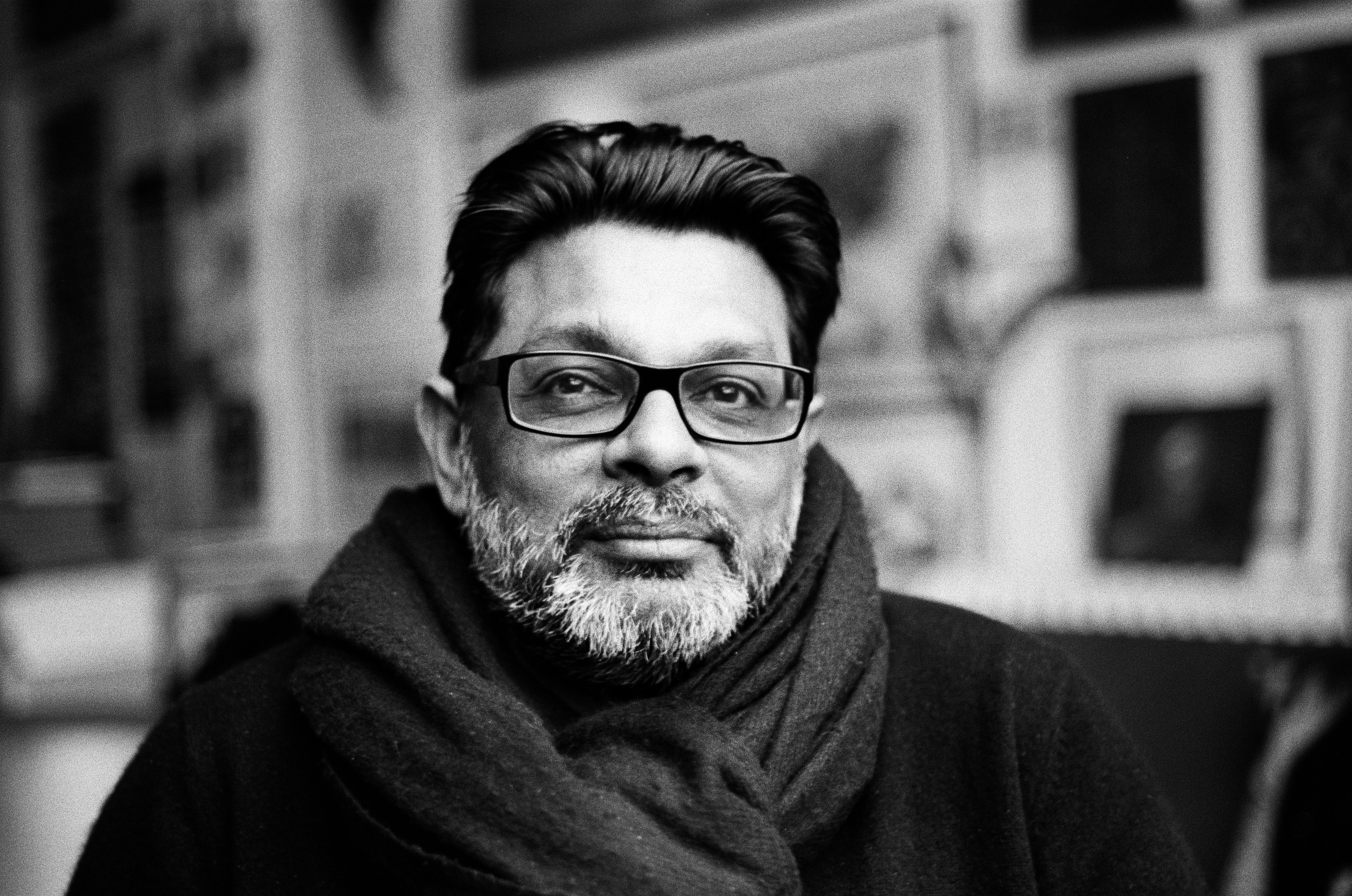
- Born: 1959 (age 66–67); Tanzania
- Education: 1986 Adult Education, Willesden College of Technology, London 1982 B.A. (Hons.) Fine Art (Sculpture), Gwent College of Further Education, Wales 1979 Foundation Course, Barnet College, London
- Occupations: Curator, critic, writer, artist

Shaheen Merali (born 1959) is a Tanzanian writer, curator, critic, and artist. Merali began his artistic practice in the 1980s committing to social, political and personal narratives. As his practice evolved, he focused on functions of a curator, lecturer and critic and has now moved into the sphere of writing. Previously he was a key lecturer at Central Saint Martins School of Art (1995–2003), a visiting lecturer and researcher at the University of Westminster (1997–2003) and the Head of the Department of Exhibition, Film and New Media at the Haus der Kulturen der Welt, Berlin (2003–2008). A regular speaker on ideas of contemporary exhibition making internationally, in 2018 he was the keynote speaker at the International Art Gallery of the Aga Khan Diamond Jubilee Arts Festival, Lisbon.

As an exhibition maker at the Haus der Kulturen der Welt, Merali curated several exhibitions accompanied by publications which he edited, including The Black Atlantic; Dreams and Trauma - Moving images and the Promised Lands; and Re-Imagining Asia, One Thousand Years of Separation. Merali was the co-curator of the 6th Gwangju Biennale, Korea (2006) and the co-curator of Berlin Heist or the enduring fascination of walled cities for the 4th Mediations Biennale, Poland (2014–2015).

In 1988, Merali co-founded the Panchayat Arts Education Resource Unit in and around Spitafields Market. The Unit's main function was one of collecting ephemera, documents and publications. The collection provided research material aimed to illustrate the link between modern and contemporary art and activism through archival practices focused on the work of South Asian, Black and issue-based artists in the United Kingdom and internationally. The Panchayat archival material was donated and is now part of the Tate library's Special Collection in London.

== Early life and education ==
Merali was born in 1959 in Tanganyika, now known as Tanzania. His family left India and arrived to Tanganyika in the early 20th century as part of the British colonial campaign to explore its colonial labour policy following its indentured labour policy. The South Asian labour was sent to East Africa to assist the further urbanisation and industrialisation of the East African territories. Merali's mother was born in Mombasa, Kenya, and his father was born in Mwanza, Tanganyika. A decade after the independence, Merali's family came to the UK as British subjects. Merali, then 11 years old, and his family settled in Borough of Enfield, North London. Merali attended Arnos School and then later Southgate college. He then completed his Foundation Course in Art and Design in Barnet College. After graduating, he attended Gwent College of Education, now known as Gwent College, Newport, where he did his undergraduate in sculpture. After graduating, Merali continued to live in Newport for a further year during which he worked with young adults on community based projects, focusing on housing estates.

== Career ==
Merali emerged as an artist in the 1980s. In his early artistic practice his medium of choice was drawing, collage and batik. Work with batik enabled the artist to question the conventional distinction between "art" and "craft", by bringing the latter into the space of gallery exhibition dedicated to 'fine art'. Another convention that Merali battled with was one of batik's decorative functions: his artistic practice consistently revolved around personal, social and political narratives. From batik work, Merali shifted towards mixed media, video and installation art.

Upon his return to London, Merali continued to work with young adults and children in formal and informal education sectors, including schools, community services and young offenders' centres. Eventually, with support of Haringey Arts Council, he organised a flexible workshop and gallery called One Spirit Batik Centre in Wood Green specialising in working with young adults with disabilities who had English as the second language. Between 1990 and 1991, Merali organised solo exhibitions of Chila Kumari Burman and Tam Joseph, as well as group exhibitions by artists from Soweto, South Africa and print makers from Havana, Cuba. He was consequently invited to exhibit his own work at the University of West Indies, where his one-person exhibition was programmed alongside a concert by Don Cherry. In early 1989, Merali met the curators and the directors of the forthcoming 3rd Havana Biennale, including Geraldo Mosquera and Liliane Llanes. They implemented Merali's proposal of participation of five Black and Asian artists, living in Britain but coming from a global diaspora, to be included in what was, until then, the dedicated Southern World biennale. Returning from Cuba in 1988, Merali organised the works of the five artists, Sonia Boyce, Allan de Souza, Pitika Ntuli and Keith Piper alongside his own work to be exhibited in the Museo Nacional de Bellas Artes in Havana, as well as at the Institute of Education, London. The experience in Havana formalised the working relationship of exhibition making and the possibility of archiving through curating.

Merali's commitment to the community education presented itself with further opportunities: in 1988 he became involved with a group of artists, Bhajan Hunjan, Symrath Patti, Allan de Souza and Shanti Thomas, who initially met at the Slade School of Art to discuss the possibilities of an organisation in a self-funded way. Merali and de Souza volunteered and became the responsible administrators of the Panchayat Arts Education Resource Centre. The organisation was involved with publishing, exhibitions and workshops, alongside its principal function of collecting the material as a record of those times. Panchayat focused on the growing connection of Black and Asian artists with a globalising art world, as well as documenting their expression relating to intersection between race, class, gender, policed sexualities and (dis)ability. In 2015, the Collection was donated as a gift to the Tate Library.

Parallel to the research and archive activity, Merali curated Crossing Black Waters at the City Gallery, Leicester, which then toured to South London Gallery, Cartwright Hall, Bradford, Oldham Gallery and Museum, making it the first time that these spaces exhibited works by artists from India, Pakistan and its diaspora in the UK. Merali further curated Extreme Unction, HIV/AIDS, RACE/ ETHNICITY, the first exhibition of artists, including Paul Pfeiffer and Ken Chu, from the US and Canada who were exploring both activism and cultural framing of HIV/AIDS. The connection to artists from the US and Canada continued with the co-curation of unbound geographies/fused histories at A Space, Toronto and the Lethaby Gallery, London.

In 2000, the same year when Panchayat won an open call for the Rich Mix Project, Merali co-curated Slow Release at Bishopsgate Goodsyard, London, which included new commissions by Edwina Fitzpatrick and installations by Dinh Q Le and Simryn Gill. Merali continued his work as an artist, participating in group shows, such as Out of India, Queens Museum, curated by Jane Farver, and Transforming the Crown, Bronx Museum of Art, curated by Mora Beauchamp-Byrd (see Artistic practice). With the development of curation as a practice and shows that were bringing him curatorial acknowledgement, the issue of artists being curators and vice versa emerged. Following publications such as Eddie Chambers' "Crowning folly" in Art Monthly, Merali decided to avoid the possible collision of interests which can arise when curators are curating their own work. Unwilling to define others through one's own practice, Merali focused on the curatorial. By that time Merali was already lecturing at Saint Martins's School of Art and University of Westminster, and in 2003 he was offered the position at Haus der Kulturen der Welt.

Upon relocating to Berlin, Merali initially worked with a devolved programme of two large-scale exhibitions: DisORIENTation curated by Jack Persekian; and Body City with Geeta Kapur and Jyotinder Jain. During his five-year contract with HKW, in 2006 Merali was granted permission to research and work with Wu Hung on the 6th Gwangju Biennale. Merali then spent considerable time between Berlin and Korea, researching and collaborating with the biennale staff, specifically looking at both Asian artists and artists working about Asia. The working relationship with Wu Hung continued at the University of Chicago, where they co-curated Re-Imagining Asia – A Thousand Years Of Separation. Further, Merali, Wu Hung and Christopher Philips worked together for the Berlin installation of the historic exhibition Between Past and Future, which had started at the ICP, New York, then toured to HWK, Berlin, and finally to the V&A, London.

In 2008, after his contract with HWK ended, Merali was asked to design and facilitate a new gallery in Berlin for the Bodhi Group, which had spaces in Mumbai, Singapore and New York. He worked with local technicians to create a larger gallery space alongside five other galleries which became known as the BodhiBerlin, which represented artists including Shilpa Gupta, Subodh Gupta and Jitish Kallat.

Merali then continued to work in Europe, Asia and America with exhibitions at the Tokyo Gallery, Budla Gallery, Kunstagenten Gallery, Berlin, Birla Academy of Art & Culture, Kolkata; Castrum Peregrini, Amsterdam; Brot Kunsthalle, Vienna; Arario Gallery, New York; Freies Museum, Berlin, etc. (see Curatorial Practice). In this period, Merali predominantly works with artists from Iran, Palestine, India and its diasporas. In 2014-2015 he co-curated the main exhibition for the 4th Mediations Biennale, Poland.

Merali is the co-organiser, as part of the 1989 Collective, of the International conference 1989 This is Tomorrow—De-canonisation and decolonisation, at the Courtauld Institute. He has started writing his debut fictional novel in 2019, as well as co-editing for the first volume (of six) in a series contingently titled Artefacts of Solidarity— Critical Pasts, Impending Futures, for London-based MAPT (Merali and Pachkhédé Texts).

== Curatorial practice ==
=== 1989-2003: Independent ===
1989

- Distinguishing Marks, Bloomsbury Gallery, Institute of Education, London. With Sonia Boyce, Keith Piper, Allan de Souza, Pitika Ntuli.
- Five Black British Artists, Havana Biennale, Cuba. First intervention by Black artists from Europe at the Havana Biennale. Including participation by Sonia Boyce, Keith Piper, Allan de Souza, Pitika Ntuli, a.

1991

- Siting Resistance, Embassy Cultural House, London, Ontario, Canada. Initiated by Jamelie Hassan, Ron Banner, with works by Sonia Boyce, Keith Piper, Allan de Souza, Pitika Ntuli.
- Group show from South Africa and Artists with (Dis)abilities, One Spirit Gallery, Haringey, London.
- One-person show by Chila Kumari Burman, One Spirit Gallery, Haringey, London.
- One-person show by Tam Joseph, One Spirit Gallery, Haringey, London.

1992

- Crossing Black Waters, City Gallery, Leicester; Cartwright Hall, Bradford; Oldham Art Gallery and Museum, Oldham; South London Art Gallery, London. Featuring UK artists: Said Adrus, Manjeet Lamba, Nina Edge, Bhajan Hunjan, Samena Rana; India artists: Anand Moy Banerji, Sushanta Guha, Arpana Caur, Sashidaran; Pakistan artists: Quddus Mirza, Anwar Saeed. Co-curated with Allan de Souza.

1993

- Forensic Fictions, ICA, London. Co-curated performance with Stuart Taylor.

1994

- Extreme Unction, HIV/AIDS, RACE/ ETHNICITY, The Garage, Hoxton, East London. Performances and installations by Asian American artists Dan Kwong, Monica Chau, Paul Pfeiffer and Ken Chu / Scottish artist Alistair Maclennan. Screenings by Asian American film-makers at the National Film Theatre including Tran T.Kim Trang.

1995

- Samena Rana, Diorama Centre, London. Posthumous exhibition on (dis)ability and photography.
- Insurgent Voices, Gallerie 101, Ottawa, Canada. Asian American artists working with HIV/AIDS, RACE/ETHNICITY. Installations by Ming Ma & Ken Chu and video works by Tran T. Kim Trang.

1996

- Creative Futures Festival, University of Westminster.
- Richard Graville, Commercial Gallery, London.
- Clare Robins, Commercial Gallery, London.
- Gender and its Multiplicities, Watermans Arts Centre, London. Video screening around masculinity. Featured artists: Ming Ma, ManAct, Michael Petry, Keith Piper, Sarbjit Samra. Co-curated with Jeremy Mulvey.

1997

- Videobox, University of Westminster Gallery, London. Video works by Black and Asian artists from Panchayat's archive.
- Foreign Vienna, University of Westminster Gallery, London. Photographic record of the changing demographic population of Vienna.

1998

- Xenographic Views, Lisl Ponger, Central Saint Martins College of Art and Design, MA Space, London.

1999

- unbound geographies/fused histories, A Space, Toronto; The Lethaby Gallery, Central Saint Martins College of Art and Design, London. Featuring artists: Simon Tegala, Tanya Syed, Jin-Min Yoon, Enam Huque. Co-curated with Shelly Bahl and Marilyn Jung.

2000

- Slow Release, Bishopsgate Goodsyard, London. Site-specific commissions around the notion of the garden. Featuring artists: Edwina Fitzpatrick, Simryn Gill, Dinh Q. Le. Co-curated with Janice Cheddie, Sharmini Pereira and Sally Tallant.

2001

- Local Artists, AI-Saqi Bookshop, London, an exhibition of International artists living in London W2. Artists: Anna Thew, Robert Taylor, David Medalla, Caryle Reedy, Tina Keene. Co-curated with Mai Ghossoub.
- Martin, Spitz Gallery, London. Postgraduate students, Central Saint Martins.

2002

- Ford, Oxford House, Ashley Gardens and 1&1, Three East London galleries. Post graduate students, Central Saint Martins School of Art and Design.

2006

- Aug 9th – Nov 11th. The Sixth Gwangju Biennale 2006: Fever Variations, First Chapter. Gwangju Biennale Hall, Gwangju. Chief Curator Wu Hung, with Curators Shaheen Merali and Binghui Huangfu and Collaborating Curator Jacquelynn Baas. Featuring artists: Lida Abdul, Lise Autogena & Joshua Portway, Thomas Bayrle, Dove Bradshaw, Chen Chieh-jen, Choi Jung Hwa, Choi Min Hwa, David Hammons, Hong Lei, Michael Joo, Jitish Kallat, Akio Kamisato/Satoshi Shibata/Takehisa Mashimo, Kim Jong-ku, Kim Sang Yoen, Sun K. Kwak, Dinh Q. Le, Lee Jong Sang, Lee Soo Kyung, Lee Ufan, Shu-min Lin, Armin Linke, Susan Meiselas, Rei Naito, Jun Nguyen-Hatsushiba, Vong Phaophanit, Jean-Marc Pelletier, Qiu Zhijie, Araya Rasdjarmrearnsook, Michal Rovner, Hiroshi Senju, Raqib Shaw, Chiharu Shiota, Shon Bong Chae, Song Dong, Manit Sriwanichpoon, Sissel Tolaas, Vasan Sitthiket, Suzann Victor, Chris Welsby, Whang In-kie, Miwa Yanagi, Zhang Dali, Zhang Huan, Zheng Liu, Xu Bing.

=== 2003-2008: Haus der Kulturen der Welt ===
- 2004 The Black Atlantic – Travelling Cultures, Counter-Histories, Networked Identities, Exhibition Curator. Featuring artists: Isaac Julien, Keith Piper, Lisl Ponger, Tim Sharp.
- 2005 Dreams and Trauma – a film festival and moving images installations, an exhibition by twelve artists of Palestinian and Israeli origin, Exhibition and Film Curator. Featuring artists: Guy Ben-Ner, Yael Bartana, Ori Gersht, Talia Keinan, Sigalit Landau, Sharone Lifschitz, Rashid Masharawi, Rosalind Nashabishi, Nira Pereg, Karen Russo, Ruti Sela & Maayan Amir, Doron Solomons and Tanya Ury.
- 2007 New York States Of Mind – Art And The City, Exhibition and Film Curator. Featuring artists: Iona Rozeal Brown, Ian Burns, Laura Carton, Carolina Caycedo, CUP, Marcel Duchamp, Rainer Ganahl, Hans Haacke, David Hammons, Jonathan Horowitz, Tehching Hsieh, Kim Jones, Jon Kessler, Mark Lombardi, Mary Ellen Mark, Sarah Morris, Gordon Matta-Clark, Josephine Meckseper, Ana Mendieta, William Pope.L, Printed Matter, Inc., Elaine Reichek, Carolee Schneemann, Ward Shelley, Tavares Strachan, Kehinde Wiley, Fred Wilson, Jordan Wolfson, Terence Koh, Nikki S. Lee, Patty Chang.
- 2008 Re-Imagining Asia – A Thousand Years Of Separation, Film Curator and Exhibition Co-curator with Wu Hung. Featuring artists: Chiho Aoshima, Parastou Forouhar, Subodh Gupta, Andreas Gursky, Ikeda Manabu, Michael Joo, Johannes Kahrs, Bharti Kher, Kim Jongku, Kimsooja, Sun K. Kwak, Dinh Q. Lê, Miao Xiaochun, Ujino Muneteru, Gabriel Orozco, Rashid Rana, Ki-bong Rhee, Takako Saito, Shen Shaomin, Shi Jinsong, Song Dong, Rirkrit Tiravanija, Zhang Dali.

=== Bodhi Art 2008 ===
- Frontlines: Notations from the Contemporary India Urban, BodhiBerlin. Featuring artists: Subodh Gupta, Atul Dodiya, Zarina Hashmi, Jitish Kallat, Riyas Komu, Valsan Kolleri, Nataraj Sharma.
- Shilpa Gupta: Blindstars, Starsblind, BodhiBerlin.
- Everywhere is War (and rumours of war), BodhiMumbai. Featuring artists: Subodh Gupta, Jitish Kallat, Hema Upadhyay, Bharti Kher, Francesco Clemente, Jon Kessler, Sara Rahbar, Zarina Hashmi, Shilpa Gupta, Prasad Raghavan, Pablo Bartholomew, Rashid Rana, Sumedh Raghavan, Alicia Framis, Reena Kallat, Chitra Ganesh, Jaishri Abichandani, Anita Dube, Rina Banerjee, Atul Dodiya, Anju Dodiya, Riyas Komu, Baiju Parthan, Vibha Galhotra, Amar Kanwar, Bose Krisnamachari.
- The Urban Spiel – a study of sculpture and material, BodhiBerlin. Featured artists: Paul Eachus, Rob Voerman and Sumedh Rajendran.
- Nataraj Sharma and N.S. Harsha at abc art berlin contemporary, BodhiBerlin.
- Jitish Kallat: Public Notice 2, BodhiSingapore.
- Riyas Komu: Related List, BodhiBerlin.

=== Meraliart ===
2009

- Indian Popular Culture and Beyond, Alcalá 31, Madrid. Featured artists: Jaishri Abichandani, Shezad Dawood, CK Rajan, GR Iranna, Riyas Komu, Prasad Raghavan, Sara Rahbar.
- The Augmented Flaws, Kunstagenten Gallery, Berlin. Featured artists: Daniele Buetti, Rajkamal Kahlon, Jon Kessler, Leila Pazooki.
- The Dark Science of Five Continents, Gallery BMB, Mumbai. Featuring artists: Jake and Dinos Chapman, Tunga, George Osodi, Riyas Komu, Jon Kessler, Wang Qingsong.
- Eerie and languid, Artisterium09, National Museum Tbilisi, Georgia. Featuring artist: Laleh Khorramian, Carlos Amorales, Jean-Gabriel Périot.
- The Promise of Loss: a contemporary index of Iran, Brot Kunsthalle, Vienna. Featuring artists: Samira Abbassy, Iman Afsarian, Asgar/Gabriel, Masoumeh Bakhtyari, Shahram Entekhabi, Parastou Forouhar, Shadi Ghadirian, Babak Golkar, Peyman Hooshmandzadeh, Abbas Kowsari, Mandana Moghaddam, Amin Nourani, Sara Rahbar, Neda Razavipour, Behrang Samadzadegan, Rozita Sharafjahan, Jinoos Taghizadeh.

2010

- The Promise of Loss: a contemporary index of Iran, Arario Gallery, New York. Featuring artists: Samira Abbassy, Iman Afsarian, Asgar/Gabriel, Masoumeh Bakhtyari, Shahram Entekhabi, Parastou Forouhar, Shadi Ghadirian, Babak Golkar, Peyman Hooshmandzadeh, Abbas Kowsari, Mandana Moghaddam, Amin Nourani, Sara Rahbar, Neda Razavipour, Behrang Samadzadegan, Rozita Sharafjahan, Jinoos Taghizadeh.
- Never Run Away, Stux Gallery, New York. Featuring artists: Reena Kallat, Sara Rahbar.
- East City: Kolkata Before the campaign, Birla Academy of Art & Culture, Kolkata. Artist: Leena Kejriwal.
- Safe to Light, Azad Gallery, Tehran. Artist: Riyas Komu.
- 3 Voices in my head, Freies Museum, Berlin. Featuring artists: Ulrich Volz, Yvette Mattern, Gregg LeFevre.
- The Stalking of Absence (vis-à-vis) Iran, Tokyo Gallery + BTAP, Tokyo. Featuring artists: Reza Abedini, Matilda Aslizadeh, Bahar Behbahani, Ramesch Daha, Sarah Dolatabadi, Ghazel, Raha Rastifard, Newsha Tavakolian.
- The 11th Hour, An Exhibition of Contemporary Art from India/Diaspora, Tang Contemporary, Beijing. Featuring artists: Tariq Alvi, Madhu and Hazra Chitrakar, Shilpa Gupta, Tushar Joag, The Otolith Group, Baiju Parthan, TV Santosh, Tejal Shah, Sudharsan Shetty, Thukral & Tagra.
- Cinema Verite Redux, Sumukha Gallery, Bangalore. Featuring artists: Subba Ghosh, Ravi Kashi, Attila Richard Lucas, Parvathi Nayar, Charly Nijensohn, Prasad Raghavan, Marina Roy.
- Besides Paris, Birla Academy of Arts and Culture, Kolkata. Featuring artists: Narayanan Akkitham, Sujata Bajaj, Madhu Mangal Basu, Maya Burman, Sakti Burman, Utpal Chakraborty, Anju Chaudhuri, Rajendra Dhawan, Lakshmi Dutt, Debesh Goswami, Bhawani Katoch, Gadadhar Ojha, Sharmila Roy Pommot, S.H. Raza, Inderjeet Sahdev, Nitin Shroff, Jiwan Singh, Viswanadhan Velu.
- Twice is too much, Freies Museum, Berlin. Featuring artists: Hassan Hajjaj and Zak Ové.
- Tough Love: a series of promises, Plataforma Revólver, Lisbon. Featuring artists: Samira Abbassy, Arahmaiani, Marc Bijl, Cecília Costa, Agathe de Bailliencourt, Nezaket Ekici, Mathias Herrmann, Gregg LeFevre, Zak Ové, K P Reji, Isabel Ribeiro, Jinoos Taghizadeh.
- The Archivists’ Impatience, The LOFT, Mumbai. Featuring artists: Daniel G. Andújar, Pablo Bartholomew, Leila Pazooki, Jean-Gabriel Périot.
- Public Enemy Number 1, Exhibit 320, New Delhi. Featuring artists: Gordon Cheung, Radhika Khimji, Prasad Raghavan, Iona Rozeal Brown, Mithu Sen.

2011

- when the moon is lying the sea weeps and dark safaris destroy the destroyed, India Art Summit, New Delhi. Featuring Artists: Madhu Mangal Basu, Koumudi Patil, Raha Rastifard, Sandip Pisalkar, Priti Vadhakkath, Nandan Ghyia.
- Entropic Sites, Shrine Empire, New Delhi. Artist: Leena Kejriwal.
- Regarding Iran, The Guild, Mumbai. Featuring artists: Amin Nourani, Barbad Golshiri, Farideh Lashaei, Mitra Tabrizian, Mohammad Hossein Emad, Peyman Hooshmandzadeh, Shirin Neshat.
- I saw that which had remained unseen, Azad Gallery, Tehran. Artist: Leena Kejriwal.
- The (Iranian) Weltanschauung, Freies Museum, Berlin. Featuring artists: Mehraneh Atashi, Navid Azimi Sajadi, Mahmood Bakhshi, Masoumeh Bakhtiary, Majid Fathizadeh, Parastou Farouhar, Farhad Fozouni, Ghazaleh Hedayat, Taha Heydary, Melodie Hosainzadeh, Katayoun Karami, Aria Kasaei, Majid K. Behesti, Azadeh Madani, Amir Mobed, Mehran Mohajer, Masoumeh Mozafari, Homan Nobakht, Sara Roohisefat, Atefeh Samaei, Rozita Sharafjahan, Mohamad M. Tabatabaie, Farideh Lashaei.
- The calculus of the dead load or "How one becomes what one is" (Nietzsche), THE LOFT, Mumbai.

2012

- The International, as part of the Odyssey, 45 years with the collection, Birla Academy of Art & Culture, Kolkata. Featuring artists: Jean Arp, Maurice Golubov, Nicholas Roerich, Louise Bourgeois, Olle Beartling, Adolf Fleischmann, Andre Masson, Amrita Sher-Gil, Augustus Rodin, Gustav Klimt, Pablo Picasso, Hedde Sterne.
- When Violence Becomes Decadent, Freies Museum, Berlin. Featuring artists: Sarnath Banerjee, Binu Bhaskar, Rajib Chowdhury, Samit Das, Natasha de Betak, Probir Gupta, Rajkamal Kahlon, Jitish Kallat, Leena Kejriwal, Simit Raveshia.
- The Indian Parallax, Birla Academy of Art & Culture, Kolkata. Featuring artists: Shebba Chhacchi, Remen Chopra, Vibha Galhotra, Probir Gupta, Jitish Kallat, Reena Kallat, Chittrovanu Mazumdar, Manish Nai, Mithu Sen, Hema Uppadhyay.
- Refraction: Moving Images on Palestine, P21 Gallery, London. Featuring artists: Mohammad Al-Hawajri, Kamal Aljafari, Tayseer Barakat, Mike Hoolboom, Khaled Hourani, Khaled Jarrar, Josh Jones, kennardphillipps, Inzajeano Latif, Manal Mahamid, Laila Shawa, Nasser Soumi, Tarzan and Arab Nasser.

2013

- (After) Love at Last Sight, Nezaket Ekici Solo Exhibition, Pi Artworks, London.
- Speaking from the heart - The Polemic Sensibility from Iran, Castrum Peregrini, Amsterdam, the Netherlands. Featuring artists: Mehraneh Atashi, Navid Azimi Sajadi, Mahmood Bakhshi, Masoumeh Bakhtiary, Majid Fathizadeh, Parastou Forouhar, Farhad Fozouni, Ghazaleh Hedayat, Taha Heydary, Melodi Hosainzadeh, Katayoun Karami, Aria Kasaei, Majid Korang Beheshti, Amir Mobed, Mehran Mohajer, Masoumeh Mozafari, Homan Nobakht, Sara Roohisefat, Atefeh Samaei, Rozita Sharafjahan, Mohamad M. Tabatabaei.
- When Violence Becomes Decadent, ACC Gallery Weimar, Germany. Featuring artists: Sarnath Banerjee, Binu Bhaskar, Rajib Chowdhury, Samit Das, Natasha de Betak, Probir Gupta, Rajkamal Kahlon, Jitish Kallat, Leena Kejriwal, Simit Raveshia.

2014

- Fragile Hands, a curatorial essay on stated subjectivities. University of Applied Arts, Heilingenkreuzer Hof, Refektorium and Sala Terrena, Vienna, Austria. Featuring artists: Mohammed Al-Hawajri, Palestine/Masoumeh Bakhtiary, Iran/Binu Bhaskar, India/ Madhu und Hazra Chitrakar, India/ Rajib Chowdhury, India/ Ramesch Daha, Austria &Iran/ Natasha de Betak, France &India/ Majid Fathizadeh, Iran/ Debesh Goswami, India & France/ Probir Gupta, India/ Ghazaleh Hedayat, Iran/ Taha Heydary, Iran/ Khaled Jarrar, Palestine/ Rajkamal Kahlon, USA, India &Germany/ Katayoun Karami, Iran/ Leena Kejriwal, India/ Amir Mobed, Iran/ Masoumeh Mozafari, Iran/ Tarzan and Arab, Palestine/ Charley Nijensohn, Argentina & Germany/ Amin Nourani, Iran/ Lisl Ponger, Austria/ Simit Raveshia, India/ Oliver Ressler, Austria/ Atefeh Samaei, Iran/ Rozita Sharafjahan, Iran/ JJ Xi, China & UK/.
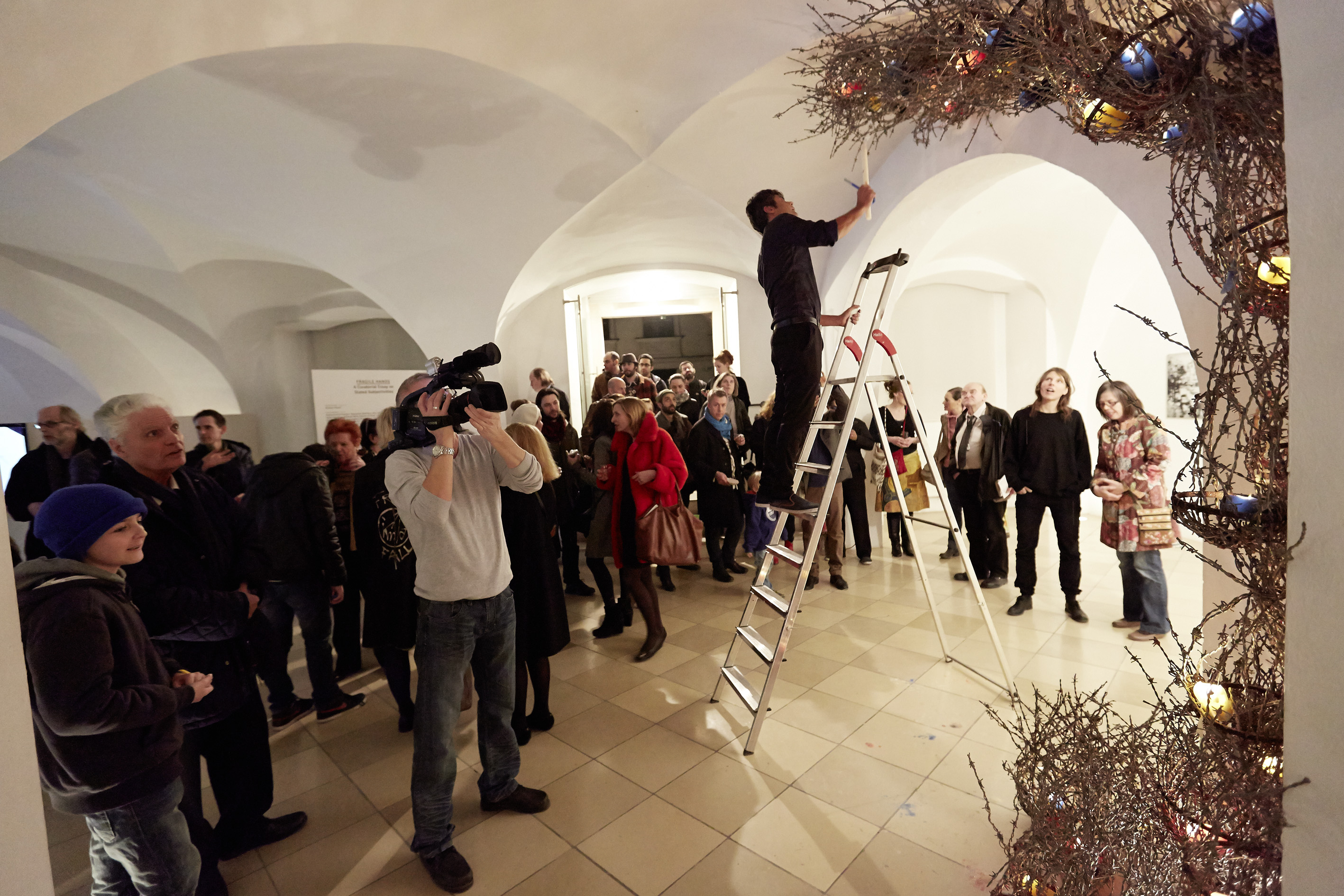
  Fragile Hands opening 2014
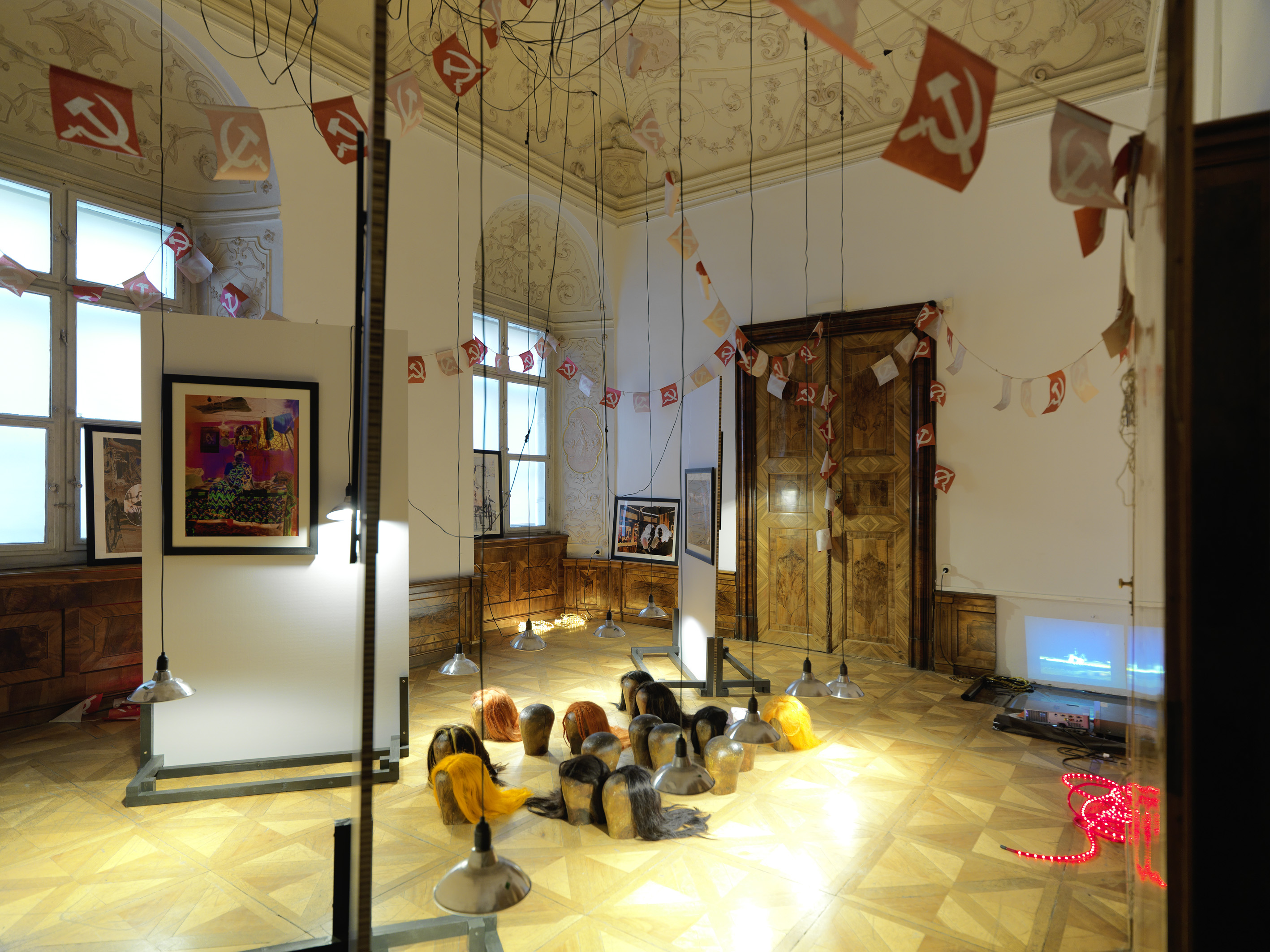
  Fragile Hands
- Berlin Heist, the Enduring Fascination with Walled Cities, 4th Mediation Biennale, Where Somewhere Becomes Here. Featuring artists: Anonymous, Kader Attia, Marc Bijl, Nezeket Ekici, Azin Feizabadi+, Thomas Florschuetz, Carla Guagliardi, Johannes Kahrs, Jonathan Meese, Leila Pazooki, Julian Rosefeldt, Esra Rotthoff, Enis Rotthoff, Iris Schomaker, Lars Teichmann, Ming Wong, Michael Wutz.

2015

- Make In India, Production and presentation of designer Prasad Raghavan work for the Indian Pavilion at Hannover Messe 2015.

== Writing ==
=== Academic books ===
2001

- «Going Native: revisited» in Beyond Frontiers: Contemporary British Art by Artists of South Asian Descent. Amal Ghosh and Juginder Lamba, eds. (London: Saffron Books, Eastern Art Publishing, 2001).

2002

- «Anthology of art», Jochen Grez project on the web, What is your vision of an unknown art?.
- «Claiming Multiple Identities», 151M Newsletter 10/02, The Netherlands (with Mai Ghoussoub) & Abwab 31.
- «Panchayat», interarchive, editor Hans Ulrich Obrist, Kunstraum der Universitat Lunenburg, Verlag der buchhandlung Walther Konig, Kaln, 2002, 276–280.

2004

- «Tehrancentric & Iraninity»,Far Near Distance – Contemporary Positions of Iranian Artists, co-edited by Shaheen Merali. Berlin: House of World Cultures.
- Interviews to Isaac Julien, Keith Piper, Lisl Ponger and Tim Sharp (German), The Black Atlantic – Travelling Cultures, Counter-Histories, Networked Identities. Berlin: House of World Cultures.
- «Curatorial Statement», The Black Atlantic – Travelling Cultures, Counter-Histories, Networked Identities. Berlin: House of World Cultures.

2005

- "A Rose by any other name…",About Beauty, ed. Shaheen Merali. Berlin: House of World Cultures, 2005, 36–37.
- "We resist because we have nothing, Philip Cheah in conversation with Shaheen Merali", Spaces and Shadows – Contemporary Art from Southeast Asia, ed. Shaheen Merali. Berlin: House of World Cultures, 2005, 36–37.
- "Fun is the new weapon, Gridthiya Gaweewong in conversation with Shaheen Merali and Annette Bhagwati", Spaces and Shadows – Contemporary Art from Southeast Asia, ed. Shaheen Merali. Berlin: House of World Cultures, 2005, 34 – 35.
- "The statements of resistance are in the works, not in the words, Ong Keng Sen in conversation with Shaheen Merali and Annette Bhagwati", Spaces and Shadows – Contemporary Art from Southeast Asia, ed. Shaheen Merali. Berlin: House of World Cultures, 2005, 32–33.
- «Impression Management – Travel Notes on Singapore, Indonesia and Thailand»,Spaces and Shadows – Contemporary Art from Southeast Asia, ed. Shaheen Merali. Berlin: House of World Cultures, 2005, 28–31.

2007

- «I make Films of the World and for the World (Jem Cohen in conversation with Shaheen Merali)», New York States Of Mind – Art And The city, ed. by Shaheen Merali. London: Saqi Books, 2008, 198–206.
- "States of Mind", New York States Of Mind – Art And The City, ed. Shaheen Merali. London: Saqi Books, 2008, 16–28.

2008

- "A great deal more but nothing much….", Re-Imagining Asia – A Thousand Years Of Separation, ed. Shaheen Merali. London: Saqi Books, 2008, 20–47.

2010

- «On visuality ideology and facilitating artists», Global Circuits: The geography of art and the new configurations of critical thought, Barcelona: ACCA – Associacio Catalana de Critics d'Art, 2010, 46–49.
- «Guilt Guilded in Gold», Voices of Change: 20 Indian Artists, ed. Gayatri Sinha. Mumbai: Marg Foundation, 2010, 266–281.
- «Between the Satanic Verses and the Axis of Evil», Voices of Change: 20 Indian Artists, ed. Gayatri Sinha. Mumbai: Marg Foundation, 2010, 198–211.

2011

- "Spaces of Freedom", in Index on Censorship, The Art Issue, Volume 40, No. 3, 118–125.
- "Delienating the vernacular", in Public Notice 3: Jitish Kallat at the Art Institute of Chicago, ed. by Madhuvanti Ghose. Chicago: The Art Institute of Chicago and Yale University Press, 2011, 39 – 45. ISBN 978-0-300-17158-7

2012

- "Slower Lower Weaker", in The Unknown as you know it, ed. Marek Wasilewski. Poznan: University of Arts Poznan, 60–69.

2013

- "The Untold (the Rise of) Schisms", InFLUX, Contemporary Art in Asia. Eds Parul Dave Mukherji, Naman P. Ahuja & Kavita Singh. Sage Publications India, 183–196.

2015

- «The Spectre (of Knowledge): Recording the Vernacular», Contemporary Art from the Middle East, Ed. By Hamid Keshmirshekan, IB Tauris, 89–97.
- «The Spectre (of Knowledge): Recording the Cosmopolitan», Dissonant Archives, Contemporary Visual Culture and Contested Narratives in the Middle East, Edited by Anthony Downey, I.B.Tauris, 432–444.

2016

- «(After) Love at Last Sight….Nezaket Ekici» The Live Art Almanac Volume 4. Edited by Harriet Curtis, Lois Keidan and Aaron Wright, Oberon Books London, 76–82.
- «Refractions: From Their Nemesis, the (Dis)obedience», CONFLICT AND COMPASSION A Paradox of difference in Contemporary Asian Art Edited by Bashir Makhoul and Alnoor Mitha, HOME Manchester, 143–160.

=== Catalogues ===
1999

- Carte Blanche / the white papers. Lethaby Press & Panchayat. Editor and contributor.

2008

- Eric Soeutre, France.
- Technology: Detection or Deception. Endword. Radical Postures. Panchayat Publication. ACE Funded. Spring 1998.
- Displaces, exhibition by Mai Ghoussoub and Souheil Sieiman. Saqi Books, London.
- India Crossing, Studio La Città, Verona. Essay: "India Crossing…The Discursive as an image".

2009

- India Contemporary, Gem Museum voor Actuele Kunst, Den Haag. Essay 1: "Exposed Tendencies". Essay 2: "Guilt Guilded in Gold".
- Being, Spirit or Ghost, Gallery OED, Cochin, Kerala. Essay: "Being, Spirit or Ghost".
- Anomalies, From Nature to Future, Rossi&Rossi, London. Essay: "Diasporic Sciences", 9–16.

2010

- Sara Rahbar, Carbon 12, Dubai. Essay: "Across Ideas, Across Continents".
- Blood and Spit - New Works by TV Santosh, Jack Shainman Gallery, NY. Essay: "The Chimera War".

2012

- Navid Azimi Sajadi, Olcay Art Gallery, Caddebostan, Istanbul. Catalogue essay.
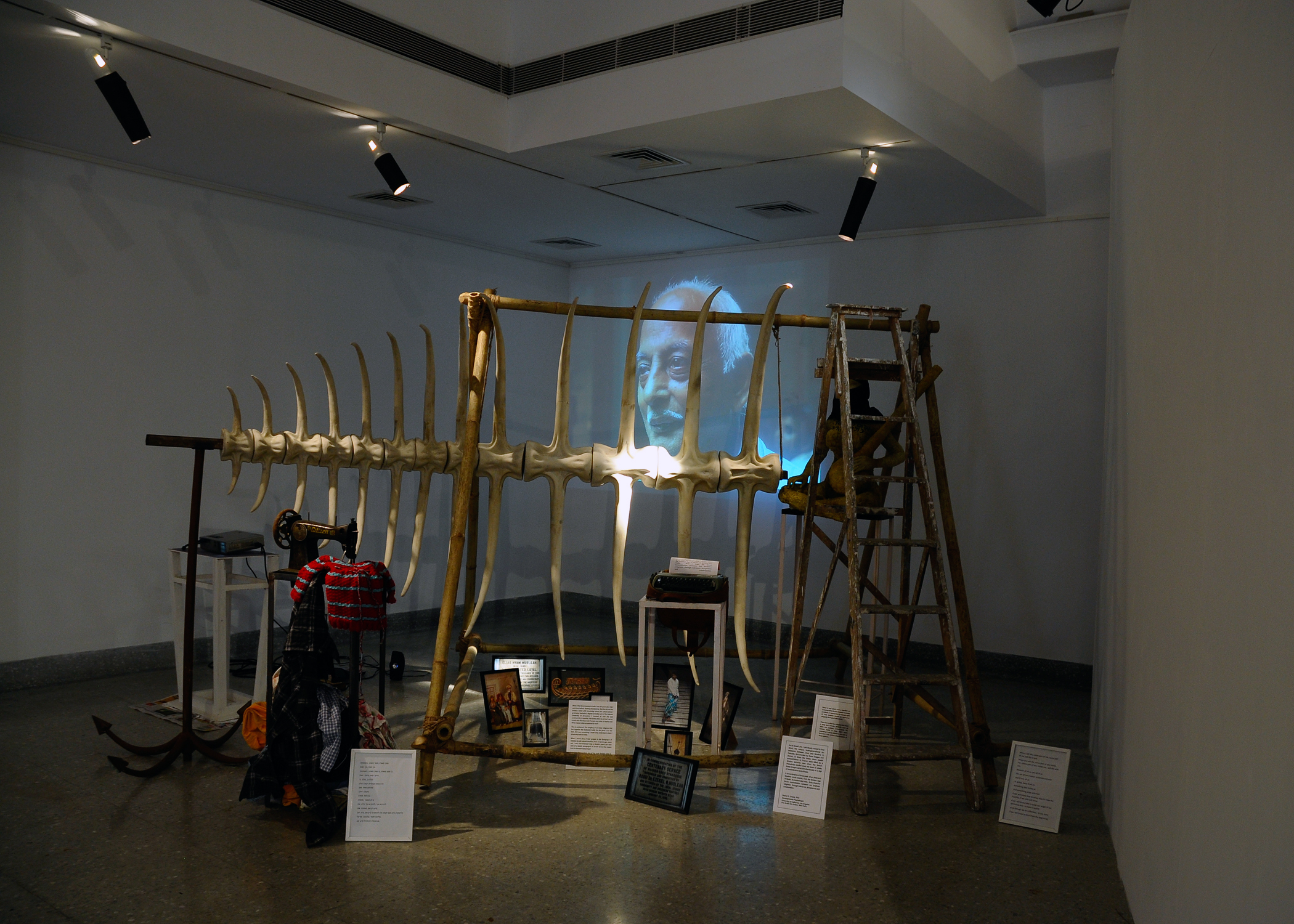
- The Indian Parallax 2012
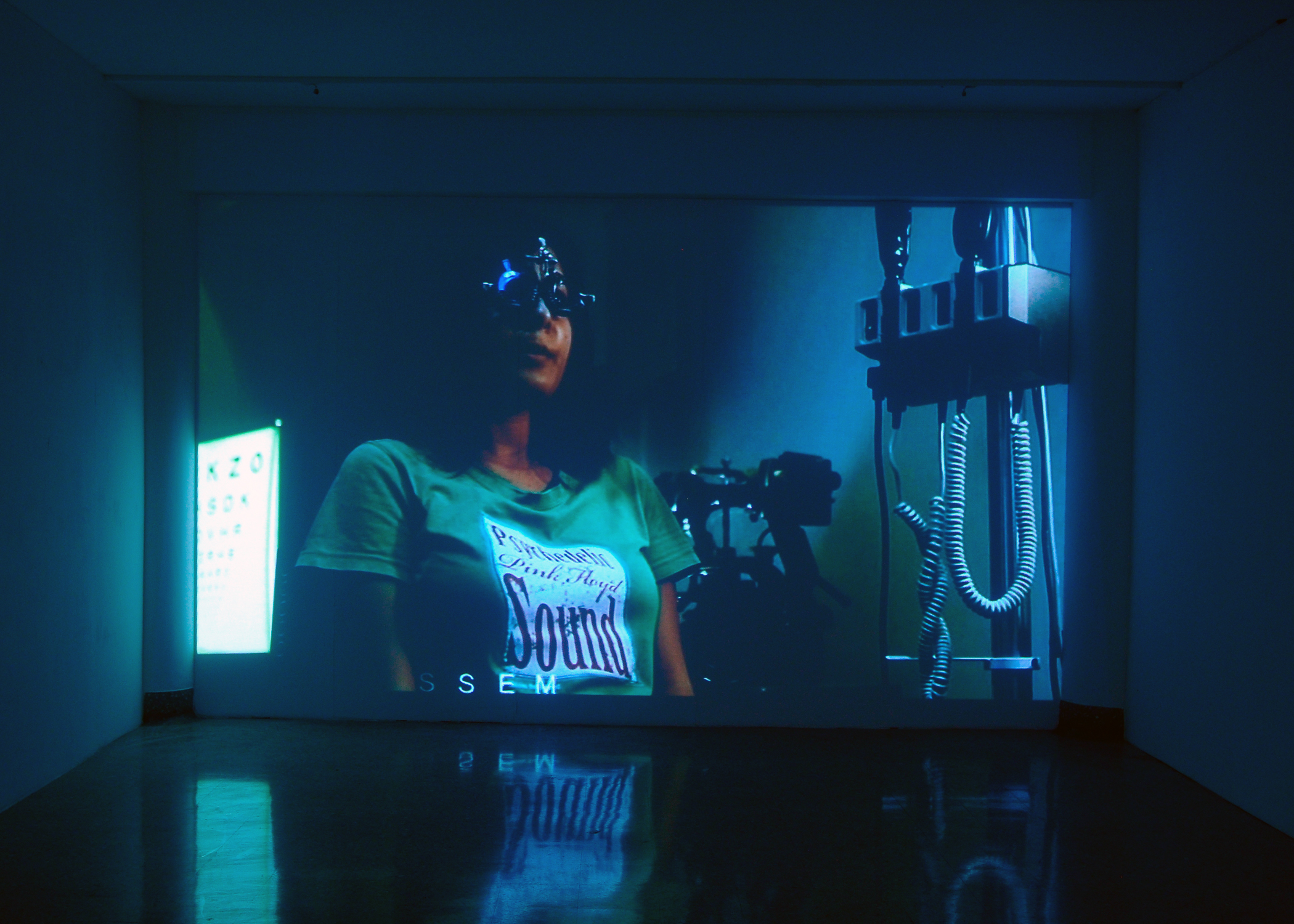
  The Indian Parallax 2012
  The Indian Parallax, Birla Academy of Art & Culture, Kolkata. Editor and essay: "The Indian Parallax or the Doubling of Happiness: works in two-dimension and sculpture towards the third image – the abstract reality".

2013

- Refraction: Moving Images on Palestine, P21 Gallery, London. Editor, and two essays: "Imaging Palestine: Moving as opposed to stillness" and "Refractions - the light in their eyes".

2014

- Fragile Hands, A curatorial essay on stated subjectivities, University of Applied Arts, Vienna. Editor and key essay: "Fragile Hands, A curatorial essay on stated subjectivities".
- Berlin Heist, the enduring fascination with walled cities, Mediations Biennale, Posnan, Poland. Two Essays: "Berlin Heist, the enduring fascination with walled cities" (Part1&2).

2015

- Years After Zero, Tea Makipaa Monograph.

2016

- Draw Me Nearer, Paperworks, WM Gallery, Amsterdam.
- Fair Trade, Leila Pazooki, Kunsthistorisches Museum Wien and touring to Tokyo / Osaka.
- Visual geography and recording Europe, Monica de Miranda at Novo Banco Photo, Museu Berado, Lisbon.

2017

- Michael Wutz 12 Baume, Forum Kunst Rottweil, Germany.
- Tavares Strachan, Isolated Labs, NY and Desert X.

2018

- JJ XI, Carrots Publishing, Beijing.

=== Essays and reviews ===
Kilts, Lungi and Dishdash. Men wearing skirts? Abwab, Int. Arab quarterly. No. 15. Work / Illustrations: Achillies Heels, London. No. 21 & 22 (Spring & Summer / Summer & Autumn 97).?

- "Texaco", Third Text (Issue 40, Autumn 97, edited by Patrick Chamoiseau). (1997)
- "Under Different Skies", Third Text (Issue 37). (1997)
- "Displaces", Third Text (Issue 39). (1997)
- "Extravagant strangers", Third Text (Issue 41, edited by Caryl Phillips). (1998)
- "Kay Hassan", Third Text (Issue 55, Summer 01). (2001)
- "Rashid Rana Interview", Indian Contemporary Art Journal. (2012)
- "The struggle for the Sublime", Art Tomorrow (issues 2–6). (2012)
- The Chitrakars; artisans amplifying the local contexts. Raw Vision. (2015)
- The Story Scrolls of Bengal | Raw Vision Magazine !!!
- On the critical decades and the role of archives. Shwetal Patel in discussion with Shaheen Merali. (2017)
- critical collective check

== Artistic practice ==
=== Solo exhibitions ===
- Channels, Echoes & Empty Chairs, Angel Row Gallery, Nottingham and South London Gallery, London. Commissioned by Angel Row Gallery. (1993)
- Torchlights, Brick Lane Police Station, East london. Commissioned by the Whitechapel Art Gallery. (1994)
- Paradigms lost, Travelling Gallery, toured North and East Scotland as part of fotofeis 95. Commissioned by Scottish Arts Council. (1999)
- Dark Matters, Kunsthalle Exnergasse, Vienna, Austria. (2000)
- Dark Matters II, Art Exchange, Nottingham. (2001)
- U blow me away, Window Gallery, Central Saint Martins, London (2001)

=== Group exhibitions ===
- Box Project, The Museum of Installation, London, Turnpike Gallery, Leigh and Angel Row Gallery, Nottingham. (CD Rom Catalogue). (1999)
- Alien/Nation, Sixpack Films, Vienna, Austria. (1999)
- Translocation, Photographers Gallery, London and Institute for Research on the African Diaspora and Caribbean, City College of New York. (1999)
- Transforming the Crown, Bronx Museum of Art, New York, USA. (1999)
- Out of India, Queens Museum, Flushing Meadows, New York, USA. (1999)
- Men and Masculinities, James Hockey Gallery, Surrey Institute of Education, Farnham, Surrey. (1999)
- Zero Zero Zero, Whitechapel Art Gallery, London. (1999)
- The Crown Jewels, Kampnagel, Hamburg and NGBK, Berlin. (1999)
- Empire and I, Pitshanger Museum and Gallery, London and AXIOM centre, Cheltenham. (1999)
- Machos y Muecas, La Casa Elizaide, Barcelona. (1999)
- Ubudoda. Metropolitan Gallery, Cape Town, South Africa. (2000)
- Chanting Heads CD Rom. Curated by David a Bailey & Sonia Boyce, AAVAA. (2001)
- Colored folks (performance), Toynbee Hall, London. Collaboration with Oreet Ashery. (2001)
- The Globe, Centre Beirut, Lebanon. Curated by Dave Beech. (2001)
- Whats wrong?, The Trade Apartments, London. (2001)
- Dressing, Readdressing, collaboration with Mai Ghoussoub. AI-Saqi Books, London. (2001)
- Host, Hastings Gallery and Museum. Curated by Mario Rossi. (2001)
- A Man, A Woman, A Machine, Centre of Attention, London. (2001)
- Site & Sight, Asian Civilisation Museum, Singapore. (2002)
- Hygiene, London School of Hygiene and Tropical Medicine. Curated by Pam Skelton and Tony Fletcher. (2002)

=== Video screenings ===
- I loose my voice in my dreams (45 mins). South London Gallery, London. (1993)
- I loose my voice in my dreams (45 mins). Galerie 101, Ottawa, Canada. (1994)
- Pandemonium, ICA, London; Rotterdam 97-26 Film festival, Holland; Desh Pradesh, Toronto, Canada; Whitechapel Open, Curtain Rd Gallery, London; KIZ- Kino, Granz, Austria; Scratch Projection, Paris, France; Tokyo 97-Image Forum, Festival, Tokyo, Japan; Pesaro 97-Film Festival, Roma, Italy; Hamburg 97–13. International Kurzfilm-Festival & No., Hamburg, Germany; Jerusalem 97-Film Festival, Jerusalem, Israel; São Paulo 97-Short Film Festival, São Paulo, Brazil; Austin 97. Cinematexas- Int. short film + video + new, Austin, USA.(1997)
- Exploding Cinema, Kenington, London. (1998)
- The post-colonial cities, curated by inIVA. The Lux Cinema, London. (1999)
- Colored Folks (18 mins) Colored Folks video and photographs. National Review of Live Arts. (2002)
- Paradigms Lost Pt. 1 (5 mins 10 Secs). (2002)
- 2016 (as performer) revisiting genesis (11 Episodes) (11 mins each) Written and Directed by Oreet Ashery, Stanley Picker Gallery and Online. (2002)
