= Mattern =

Mattern is a surname. Notable people with the surname include:

- Al Mattern (1883–1958), professional baseball player
- Blakely Mattern (born 1988), American soccer defender
- Cody Mattern (born 1981), American fencer
- Friedemann Mattern (born 1955), German scientist
- Horst Mattern (born 1943), West German sprint canoeist
- Jimmie Mattern (1905–1988), American aviator
- Joachim Mattern (born 1948), East German sprint canoeist
- Richard Mattern Montgomery (1911–1987), Chief-of-Staff of the U. S. Strategic Air Command 1952–1956
- Walter Mattern (1913–1974), Hauptsturmführer (Captain) in the Waffen-SS during World War II
- Yvette Mattern, Pureto Rican artist

== See also ==
- Young-Yentes-Mattern Farm, Huntington, Indiana, USA
- Matte (disambiguation)
