= Heather Passmore =

Canadian artist

- Education: University of British Columbia (MFA in Visual Arts, 2004; BFA in Visual Arts, 2000)
- Known for: Painter, illustrator and photographer
- Website: heatherpassmore.com

Heather Passmore is a Canadian painter, illustrator, and photographer based in Vancouver. She has exhibited extensively across Canada and internationally, and is a founding member of the artist collective Art Mamas. Her work is held in private and official public collections across Canada such as the Vancouver Art Gallery.

== Career ==
Her personal artistic practice involves experimentation with "socio-historically laden materials," such as breast milk and discarded mattress covers, to explore themes like poverty, violence, and motherhood.

In 2015, Passmore co-founded Vancouver-based art collective Art Mamas along with eight other artist-mothers, including Matilda Aslizadeh. The collective aims to counter the denigration of motherhood within professional spheres such as the art world. Passmore said in a 2019 interview with CBC Arts, "People take time off for sabbaticals, to travel or to get a degree, but taking time off to engage in something that builds character and deepens your knowledge, such as motherhood, is not valued in the same way...The assumption is that you won't continue with your work because you won't have time. But pregnancy itself raises all the biggest questions we know how to ask — things that relate deeply to religion and philosophy."

In 2019, Passmore's sculpture Portal was exhibited as part of the Oak Bay Parks, Recreation & Culture ArtsAlive sculpture tour, and was purchased by the district in 2020.

== Selected exhibitions ==
=== Solo exhibitions ===
- Roman Charity, White Water Gallery, Aug. 28 – Sept. 30, 2018; Vernon Public Art Gallery, Jan. 9 – Mar. 4, 2020.
- Enlightenment, Malaspina Printakers, Nov. 7 – Dec. 7, 2014; Harcourt House, Mar. 9 – Apr. 7, 2017.
- Gatekeepers, AKA Gallery, May 4 – Jun. 15, 2012.
- Form Letters, The New Gallery, Mar. 18 – Apr. 21, 2011.
- Mis-Takes: Disappearing Drawings, Struts Gallery, Jan. 18 – Feb. 16, 2008.
- Linoleums, Campbell River Art Gallery, Aug. 17 – Nov. 2, 2007.
- Bikini Project, Richmond Art Gallery, Mar. 11 – Apr. 23, 2006; Gallery 101, May 18 – Jun, 17, 2006.

=== Group exhibitions ===
- Teeth, Loan and Trust Company, Consolidated: The Trylowsky Collection, Griffin Art Projects, Sept. 25 – Dec. 11, 2021.
- Things' Matter, Or Gallery, Dec. 8, 2012 – Jan. 26, 2013.
- Contemporary Histories: Intersecting Pasts and Futures, AHVA Library Gallery, UBC, Feb. 23 – Mar. 12, 2011.
- Take Your Time, Simon Fraser University Gallery, Oct. 31 – Dec. 12, 2009.

=== Public art ===
- 'Revolting Daughters,' 11 Artist Designed Bike Racks, Port Moody, BC (permanent display), 2021.
- 'Portal,' ArtsAlive, Willows Beach Esplanade, Oak Bay, Victoria, BC (permanent display), unveiled Jun. 20, 2019.
