= Roty =

Roty may refer to:

- Georgina Roty (1908–1940), French swimmer
- Oscar Roty (1846–1911), French medallist
- Roty, Bakhmut Raion, Ukraine
- Rookie of the Year (award) (ROTY or ROY)

== See also ==
- Roti (disambiguation)
