= Rauti =

Rauti may refer to

== Places ==
- Răuți, a village in Uivar Commune, Timiș County, Romania

== Persons ==
- Isabella Rauti (born 1962), Italian academic and politician
- Nicola Rauti (born 2000), Italian professional footballer
- Pino Rauti (1926–2012), Italian politician of the far-right

== See also ==
- Ruti (disambiguation)
