= Ruti =

Ruti may refer to:

== As a given name ==
- Ruti Olajugbagbe, winner of series seven of The Voice UK
- Ruti Sela, Israeli video artist
- Ruti Zisser, Israeli American lifestyle designer, fashion designer, wardrobe stylist, and businesswoman

== As a surname ==
- Mari Ruti, Distinguished Professor of critical theory and of gender and sexuality studies at the University of Toronto

== Other uses ==
- Aker (god), the Egyptian god of the horizon
- Ruti (crater), a crater on Ganymede
- Rüti (disambiguation), a number of places in Switzerland
- Roti (disambiguation)
- Ruti, an alternative spelling of roti, an unleavened flatbread
- Ruti (film), a 1998 Bangladesh film
