= Ghoussoub =

Ghoussoub is a surname. Notable people with the surname include:

- Mai Ghoussoub (1952–2007), Lebanese writer
- Nassif Ghoussoub (born 1953), Canadian mathematician
