= Anahita Ghabaian Etehadieh =

Iranian gallery owner and author (born 1962)

- آناهیتا قباییان (اتحادیه)
- Born: 1962 (age 63–64); Tehran, Iran
- Education: Paris Diderot University
- Occupations: Gallerist, Curator, and Author
- Title: Chevalière of the ordre des Arts et des Lettres

Anahita Ghabaian Etehadieh (Persian: آناهیتا قباییان (اتحادیه); born 1962) is an Iranian gallery owner and curator.

== Life and work ==
Etehadieh was born in Tehran. She earned a Bachelor's degree in Computer Science and a PhD in History from Paris Diderot University.

In 2001, Etehadieh founded the Silk Road Gallery, dedicated to promoting contemporary Iranian photography and art. In 2009, she was appointed as the artistic director of the 2nd Photoquai Biennial at Musée du Quai Branly – Jacques Chirac. In 2015 to 2016 she was co-curator of Shadi Ghadirian's retrospective at the Bibliothèque municipale de Lyon (with Sylvie Aznavourian). She curated Newsha Tavakolian's exhibition at the Fondation Carmignac (Carmignac Photojournalism Award) in 2015.

== Publications ==
- Ghabaian, Anahita; Saberi, Minou; 12 photographic journeys: Iran in the 21st century. London: I.B. Tauris (2005). ISBN 978-1-85043-719-2.
- Persian translation of Conversations With Fellini (by Costanzo Costantini); Farzan-rouz publications (2007-2008). ISBN 964-321-014-6.
- Ghabaian, Anahita (co-editor); La Photographie iranienne: Un regard sur la création contemporaine en Iran (2012). ISBN 978-2919507061.
- Ghabaian, Anahita (co-editor); Shadi Ghadirian: Rétrospective, Somogy Editions d'Art (2015). ISBN 978-2757210000.
- Ghabaian, Anahita (co-editor); Iran, année 38: La photographie contemporaine iranienne depuis la révolution de 1979 (2017). ISBN 978-2845975811.
- Ghabaian, Anahita (co-editor); Espace vital, femmes photographes iraniennes (2023). ISBN 978-2845979512.

== Honours ==
- Chevalière of the ordre des Arts et des Lettres
