= Shadi Ghadirian =

Iranian photographer (b. 1974)

- Born: 1974 (age 51–52); Tehran, Iran
- Education: Islamic Azad University, Central Tehran Branch (BA)
- Occupation: photographer
- Spouse: Peyman Hooshmandzadeh (divorced)

Shadi Ghadirian (born 1974; Persian: شادی قدیریان) is an Iranian contemporary photographer. Her work is influenced by her experiences as a Muslim woman living in contemporary Iran, but her work also relates to the lives of women throughout the world. Through her work, she critically comments on the pushes and pulls between tradition and modernity for women living in Iran, as well as other contradictions that exist in everyday life. She explores the topics of censorship, religion, modernity, and the status of women. Ghadirian gained international recognition through the series Qajar and Like Every Day in 1998 and 2001. She lives in Tehran.

== Early life and education ==
Shadi Ghadirian was born in 1974 in Tehran, Iran. After graduating high school in 1988, Ghadirian studied art and photography at Azad University in Tehran (now Islamic Azad University, Central Tehran Branch), under Bahman Jalali and received her B.A. in photography.

In 2000, Ghadirian married the Iranian photographer and author Peyman Hooshmandzadeh, who had also studied photography at Azad University.

In addition to focusing on individual projects, Ghadirian currently works at the Museum of Photography in Tehran.

== Works ==
Shadi Ghadirian has produced nine photographic series to date, titled Miss Butterfly, Nil, Nil, Be Colourful, Like Every Day, Qajar, Ctrl+Alt+Delete, My Press Photo, Out of Focus, and West by East. These series attempt to work through and reveal the issues that women face living in contemporary Iran while also bringing to light the complexities of negative stereotypes that these same women face coming from abroad.

=== Qajar (1998) ===
In Ghadirian’s first series, Qajar (1998), the artist arranged portraits of women, mainly her friends and family, using backdrops and dress reminiscent of the Qajar era (1785-1925), but added contemporary Western props such as a boom box, a Pepsi can, a phone or a vacuum. Portraits taken in the Qajar period were traditionally captured in a formal setting, and the subject often posed with prized possessions and objects that pointed to elite status. This juxtaposition of the traditional and the contemporaneous served as a starting off point for later series that further developed around the theme of contradiction in everyday life in contemporary Iran.

=== Be Colorful (2002) ===
Ghadirian examines the ever-shifting standards of female appearance in Iran with Be Colorful (2002). Women are photographed garbed in various brightly colored veils behind paint-speckled glass.

=== West by East (2004) ===
West by East (2004) was a part of larger exhibit by the same name where the artists expressed their views of the West. Ghadirian takes self-portraits of her dressed in Western clothing then uses black paint to censor all skin that would be covered by modest dress, i.e. all but the hands and face. This imitates how Western women were shown in imported magazines due to Iranian censorship during Ghadirian's childhood.

=== Ctrl+Alt+Del (2006) ===
In Ctrl+Alt+Del (2006), Ghadirian explores the extent in which technology is accepted by using application icons to replace or extend the body. The inspiration of the work came from advice she was given. She recounts the story, saying, “When I started the series, I was pregnant. Everybody told me I shouldn’t use the cell phone or computer because it would be dangerous for both me and the baby.”

=== Nil, Nil (2008) ===
Nil, Nil (2008) integrates military equipment into everyday scenes. The work discusses how war affects civilian's everyday life both during and after the conflict. In an interview with Global Fund for Women, Ghadirian refers to a specific photograph of pumps and boots saying, "... I want to show everyday life and war simultaneously. I wanted to show how war is reflected inside the home—what happens to the other members of the family who stayed at home and are now waiting. I also wanted to show what life is like when somebody comes back from war, and that many things change after war." The work was in tribute to the scars that war has left both on herself and those she spoke to for this project. She states, "We can say a word, ‘WAR’ and move on but the meaning of war for those who are actually there is so different from the rest of us. ...War destroys everything and I wish all the artists do something about it and show the real face of it."

=== White Square (2009) ===
White Square (2009) shows various military gear decorated with a red bow. The photos are taken with a plain white background. This series is often paired with Nil, Nil due to the use of the same props to contrast the brutality of war. However, where Nil, Nil has war both invade and be contained by home, White Square takes the war paraphernalia out of context and contrasts the aggression of the war object with the delicacy of the bow.

=== Miss Butterfly (2011) ===
Ghadirian's Miss Butterfly (2011) is a series of black and white photos based on the Persian play "Miss Butterfly" written by Bijan Mofid that she told to her child. In the tale, a butterfly, along with other bugs, is trapped by a spider and eventually sacrifices herself in order to free the others which in turn frees herself. The series shows an Iranian woman wearing a traditional hijab weaving a spiderweb across various openings like doorways and windows, creating a separation between the figure and the outside world. The photos feature dramatic lighting, with the scene lit from the outside of an otherwise contained room. The series explores the idea of being both protected and trapped within the home.

=== Too Loud a Solitude (2015) ===
Shadi Ghadirian completed her first video piece called Too Loud a Solitude in 2015. The video is a compilation of “slices of instants” commenting on ambiguity of human origin, and the effect of the crowd.

== Exhibitions ==
=== Group exhibitions ===
Ghadirian first involvement group exhibitions, Group Exhibition (About Children) at Aria Gallery and Tehran International Documentary Photo exhibition, both took place in Tehran, Iran in 1997. Since then, the contemporary photographer has taken part in a diverse collection of group exhibitions all over Europe, North and South America, Northern Africa, Asia, and Australia as well as exhibitions in Iran and the Middle East. Her work has appeared at the Venice Biennale (2015), and many other prominent biennials and galleries.

Most notably, Ghadirian has contributed 13 photographs from her Qajar series to a group exhibition to “She Who Tells a Story: Women Photographers From Iran and the Arab World” which began in 2013. The traveling exhibition is a compilation of works by Ghardirian along with 11 other female artists that addresses the complexity of the Western stereotype of the hijab and internal, everyday struggles for women in the Arab world. “She Who Tells a Story” has been on at the Museum of Fine Arts in Boston in 2013, the Cantor Arts Center at Stanford University in 2015, the Carnegie Museum of Art in Pittsburgh in 2015 and most recently at the National Museum of Women in the Arts in Washington D.C., on until 2016 July 31.

Ghadirian contributed two photos from her Miss Butterfly (2011) series to Boston's Museum of Fine Arts' "Make Believe" exhibition that was shown from July 20, 2019 to January 20, 2020. The exhibition showed modern interpretations of folk tales and imaginary worlds more broadly. "Kay Nielson's Enchanted Vision: the Kendra and Allan Daniel Collection" was a companion exhibition shown in an adjacent room. "Make Believe" also featured 4 other contemporary photographers: Hellen van Meene, Paolo Ventura, Nicholas Kahn, and Richard Selesnick.

=== Solo exhibitions ===
Shadi Ghadirian’s first solo exhibitions were at Golestan Gallery in Tehran, Iran and Leighton House Museum in London, UK, both in 1999. Since, Ghadirian has held solo exhibitions all over the world, mostly in Europe, North America and the Middle East.

Ghadirian’s work exists in public collections at The British Museum and The Victoria and Albert Museum in London, UK; the Centre Georges-Pompidou in Paris, France; the LACMA in California, USA; The Smithsonian Museum in Washington DC, USA; the Museum of Fine Arts in Boston, USA; the Mumok in Vienna, Austria; Musée d’Art et d’Archéologie in Aurillac, France; the Devi Art Foundation in Gurgaon, India; and the Museum of Contemporary Art in Tehran, Iran.

- 2015- Dar Al Funoon Gallery, Kuwait; “The Others Me”, officine dell’Immagine Gallery, Milan, Italy
- 2015- Bibliothèque municipale de Lyon; Shadi Ghadirian's retrospective; Curated by Anahita Ghabaian Etehadieh, Lyon, France

== Awards ==
In 1995, Ghadirian won a competition for a photograph from her Qajar series depicting two women in hijabs holding a mirror reflecting banned books in a shelf. However, the ministry of culture in Iran called the photograph “too contentious”, and her piece was disqualified from the competition. For this, The Guardian deems her a “rule breaker”.

On February 4, 2009, The Guardian named Ghadirian, “Artist of the Week 27”.

== Publications ==
- Anahita Ghabaian Etehadieh, Sous la direction de, "La photographie iranienne, Un regard sur la création contemporaine en Iran", L'Atelier d'édition Loco/Silk Road Gallery, 2011, 191 pages
- Rose Issa, Shadi Ghadirian: Iranian Photographer; Saqi Books, 2008, ISBN 9780863566387
