= Iona Rozeal Brown =

American painter

- Born: Iona Rozeal Brown; 1966 (age 59–60); Washington D.C., USA
- Education: Pratt Institute, San Francisco Art Institute, Skowhegan School of Painting and Sculpture, Yale University School of Art
- Notable work: The Blackface Paintings
- Style: Traditional Ukiyo-e Print Techniques
- Movement: Post-Soul Movement

Rozeal is a contemporary American artist known for her colourful and complex cross cultural painting technique. She best known for her narrative canvases commenting on cultural, racial and sexual identity. A large part of her work touches on the differences between appropriation and appreciation. Ultimately, Rozeals work and portrayal of pornographic prints illustrates a set of politically powerful messages.

== Background ==
=== Early life ===
Rozeal, born Iona Rozeal Brown, was born in Washington, DC. in 1966 at the height of the civil rights movement. This African-American, contemporary artist keeps her family and personal life very private. While she was a child, her mother was a junior high math teacher and her father an academic advisor at the University of the District Columbia in Washington D.C.

=== Education ===
Rozeal began her education in 1991, attending the University of Maryland for a Bachelor of Sciences in Kinesiological Sciences. She initially wanted to pursue a career in physiotherapy but her interest drifted. After graduating, she attended the Montgomery County Community College in 1995, where she took a few classes. Her artistic career did not begin till her early twenties. She started her studies at the Pratt Institute of Art in Brooklyn, New York in 1996. Soon after attending Pratt, Rozeal attended the San Francisco Art Institute and the Skowhegan School of Painting and Sculpture, during the late 1990s, where she received her Bachelor of Fine Arts. The artist continued her education at Yale University in New Haven, Connecticut. Here she completed her Master of Fine Arts in 2002.

== Career ==
=== Early work ===
While receiving her master's degree at Yale, Rozeal created her first collection, A3 Black on Both Sides [A3 stands for Afro-Asiatic Allegory]. This work as described by Rozeal is a visual articulation of traditional Ukiyo-e aesthetics mixed with signifiers of hip-hop culture to reflect this multicultural synergy that she was interested in understanding. This cultural hybridity reflected Asian black-faced women and ultimately explored the "rebellious" Ganguro style of the 1990s. This clash of cultures in her artwork exposed Asian appropriation of African American women. For example, Blackface #19, one of ten works in her collection, depicts a young Japanese woman sitting in a silk kimono with traditional African hairstyle. It is assumed that the young women illustrated in the painting is a geisha. Geishas were female performers who wore traditional kimonos and painted their faces white and who danced and sang. Poking out from beneath this traditionally worn Japanese garment are blue jeans, white Adidas shoes and a thick gold chain. These Afro-Asiatic characters explored the impacts of American popular culture on Japanese culture.

== Influences ==
Rozeal's work looks at African American culture and how it has touched upon other cultures around the world, specifically Japanese culture. As a child, Rozeal accounts one of her first interactions with Japanese culture when attending a Kabuki theater performance. This type of theatrical performance, dating back to the seventeenth century, is known for its elaborate costumes and dramatized production.

Later in her life, while attending school at the San Francisco Art Institute, Rozeal's curiosity with Japanese culture grew with her encounter with the Ganguro. Ganguro, sometimes referred to as Gyaru, is a fashion style that developed in the mid-1990s. With this trend, young Japanese women would darken their skin, bleach their hair and wear brightly colored extravagant outfits. This plays a large role in her artwork. Brown expresses mixed feelings about the trend saying that this fetishization of blackness is "pretty weird, and a little offensive" (Genocchio 2004).

With this curiosity and inspiration developing during her undergraduate studies, she was determined to learn and explore the Ganguro phenomenon. Rozeal travelled abroad to Japan in 2001. Brown was interested in the artistic appropriation of African American cultural traditions. Given this, she is concerned with the construction of global identity and as a result there is an emergence of the Post-Soul aesthetic in her artwork. Her experiences abroad helped shape her questions regarding the global reconstruction and fascination of African American culture and identity.

This introduction to Afro-Asian culture extended beyond the Ganguro phenomenon and childhood exposure to Kabuki theater but also hip-hop culture. Discussed in an interview in the spring of 2003, Brown expresses that there is a well-established relationship between African American hip-hop and the influences on Asian cultures. Rozeal indicates that music that this plays a huge role in both her life and work.

== Style and technique ==
The artist is trained in the traditional artistry of Japanese Ukiyo-e. This style was produced in the mid-1700s and was often produced as woodblock prints and paintings and in literal terms means 'pictures of the floating world'. Artists often depict Kabuki actors, geishas, flora and fauna, landscapes, etc. Unlike early color Ukiyo-e pieces, in which colours tended to be softer Rozeal's work is very pigmented and colorful. This was a more contemporary adaptation of ukiyo-e. Lighting and shading adds depth to pieces of work thus it is surprising Rozeal manages to maintain one-dimensionality. This means that the work is created on a flat surface, there is no depth to the illustrations.

== Selected exhibitions and collections ==
Rozeal's work has been exhibited around the world. She has been featured in a number of solo exhibitions at numerous galleries and institutions including:

- A3 Black on Both sides (2004) at the Spelman College Museum of Fine Arts

- Iona Rozeal Brown: Matrix 152 (2004) exhibited at Wadsworth Atheneum

- The Paintings of Iona Rozeal Brown (2007) at the University of Arizona Museum of Art

- All Falls Down (2010) at Museum of Contemporary Art Cleveland

- Introducing... The House of Bando (2012) in New York, NY at Salon 94

- iROZEALb (2014) at the Joslyn Art Museum

In addition to the numerous solo exhibitions Rozeal's artwork has been featured in the collections of the Hirschhorn Museum and Sculpture Garden, the Virginia Museum of Fine Arts, the National Gallery of Art, and the North Carolina Museum of Art. In 2011, she presented battle of yestermore at Skylight West commissioned for Performa 11.
