= Samira Abbassy =

Iranian-born British painter (born 1965)

- Born: 1965 (age 59–60); Ahvaz, Imperial State of Persia (now Iran)
- Other names: Samira al-Abbasi, Samira Abbasi
- Education: Birmingham Polytechnic, Canterbury College of Art (BFA)
- Occupation: Visual artist
- Known for: Painting, drawing
- Website: www.samiraabbassy.com

Samira Abbassy (born 1965) is an Iranian-born British painter and draftsperson, of Arab heritage. Her work addresses issues of mythology, female deities, psyche, memory, and the diaspora. Abbassy lives in New York City, and previously lived in London.

== Early life and education ==
Samira Abbasy was born in 1965 to an Arab family, in the city of Ahvaz in Khuzestan Province, Imperial State of Persia (now Iran). Her family moved to London when she was two years old, and she was raised in Kent.

She studied drawing at Birmingham Polytechnic (now Birmingham City University) and then Canterbury College of Art (now Kent Institute of Art & Design), where she obtained a BFA degree in painting in 1987.

== Career ==
Abbasy began making art in the 1980s. After graduating, she exhibited her work in London for ten years, and then moved to New York City in 1998. Abbasy's work is a marriage between Western art and Eastern art traditions, including referencing Christian iconography, as well as Persian and Indian miniature painting, Chinese painting, and Qajar court painting.

She was awarded a fellowship by New York Foundation for the Arts (NYFA) in 2007. She was affiliated with the South Asian Women’s Creative Collective. The Elizabeth Foundation for the Arts (EFA) awarded her a lifetime membership, in recognition of her work in developing the EFA Studio Program.

Abbasy's artworks are in public museum collections, including the Metropolitan Museum of Art, the British Museum, the Los Angeles County Museum of Art, and the Grey Art Museum collection at New York University.
