= Sara Rahbar =

Iranian-born American artist (born 1976)

- سارا رهبر
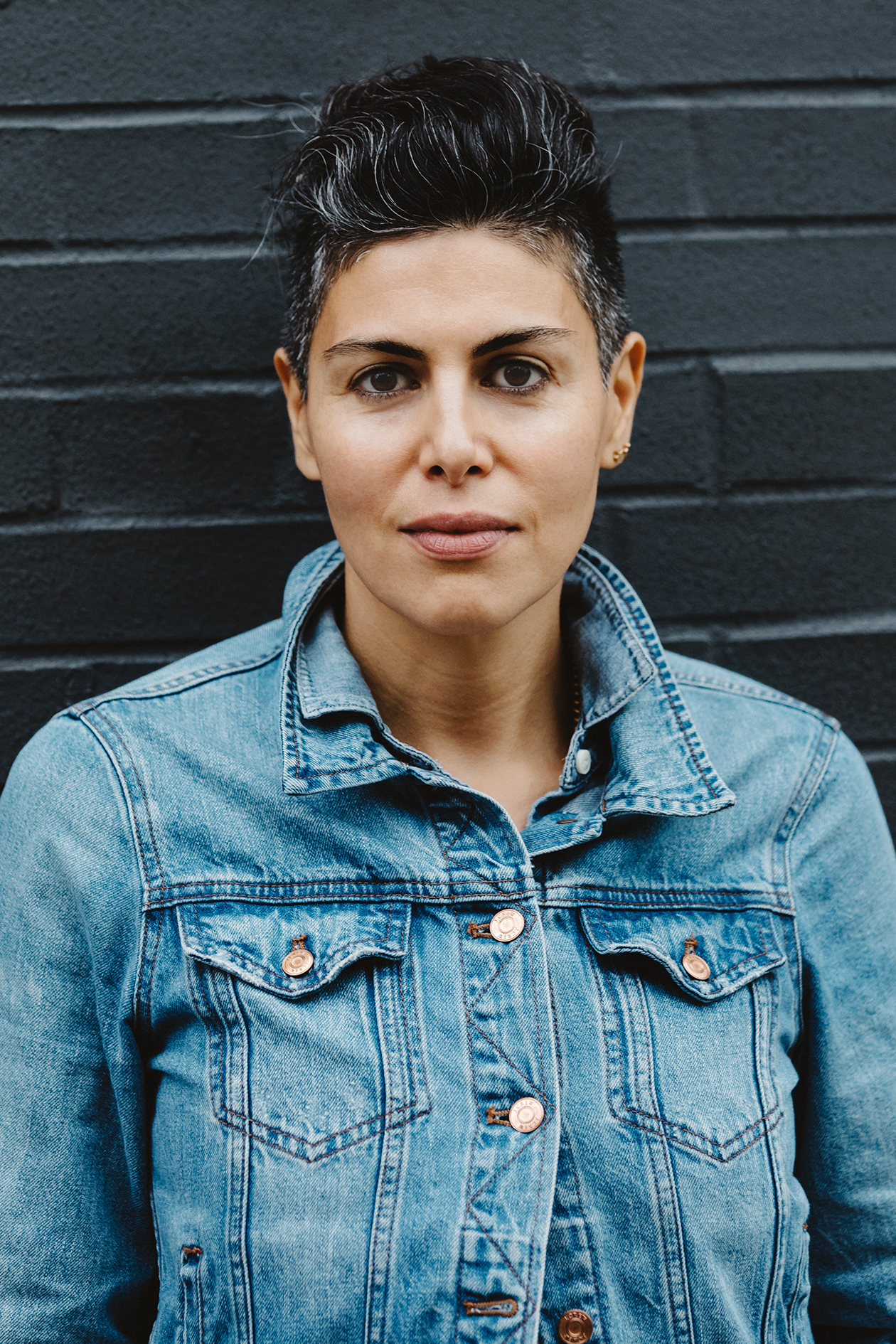
- Born: 1976 (age 49–50); Tehran, Imperial State of Iran
- Education: Fashion Institute of Technology; Central Saint Martins College of Art and Design
- Known for: Mixed media art
- Notable work: The Flag Series (2005–2019)
- Style: assemblage
- Website: www.sararahbar.com

Sara Rahbar (born 1976) is an Iranian-born contemporary visual artist. Her work ranges from photography to sculpture to installation, all of which reveal and transform the artist's personal experiences and are intimately autobiographical. Her work explores concepts of nationalism, separation and belonging - driven by central ideas of pain, violence and the complexity of the human condition. Compelled by an instinctual obsession to piece together and dissect, her approach is reflective of her need to deconstruct her emotions and memories. She is based in New York City.

== Biography ==
Rahbar was born in 1976 in Tehran, Iran. In 1982, Rahbar and her family left Iran in the beginning of the Iranian Revolution and the early stages of the Iran-Iraq War, These experiences left many traumatic memories that have influenced her work.

Rahbar studied at Fashion Institute of Technology from 1996 until 2000 and in 2004 she continued her education at Central Saint Martins College of Art and Design in London.

The first body of work that created international recognition for the artist was the Flag Series (2005–2019), in which traditional fabrics and objects are reworked as collages that form various incarnations of the American and Iranian flag, exploring ideas of national belonging, as well as the conflicting role of flags as symbols of ideological and nationalistic violence.

Rahbar's work is in various public museum collections including the Centre Pompidou, the British Museum, and at the Davis Museum at Wellesley College, among others.

Rahbar was a recipient of the Joan Mitchell Foundation Fellowship in 2025.

== Solo exhibitions ==
- 2020 – The space between us, Carbon 12, Dubai, United Arab Emirates
- 2019 – Nada House, Governors Island, New York, United States
- 2018 – Carry me home, Dallas Contemporary, Dallas, Texas, United States
- 2017 – Salvation, Carbon 12, Dubai, United Arab Emirates
- 2014 – Swarming, Carbon 12, Dubai, United Arab Emirates
- 2012 – Restless Violence, Carbon 12, Dubai, United Arab Emirates
- 2011 – I have no faith left for the devil to take, Sara Rahbar, Hilger Contemporary, Vienna, Austria
- 2010 – Whatever we had to lose we lost, and in a moonless sky we marched, Sara Rahbar, Carbon 12, Dubai, United Arab Emirates
- 2009 – Contradicting Realities: Recent works by Sara Rahbar, Tyler Art Gallery at SUNY Oswego, New York, United States

== Group exhibitions ==
- 2016 – 2050 A Brief History of the Future, Palazzo Reale, Milano, Italy The Royal Museums of Fine Arts of Belgium, Belgium and the National Museum of Fine Arts, Taiwan.
- 2015 – 56th Venice Biennale, Iran Pavilion, Venice, Italy
- 2014 – The Shade of the Moon, Changwon Sculpture Biennial, Korea
- 2013 – Aya Haidar, Huda Lutfi, Sara Rahbar, bischoff/weiss gallery, London, England
- 2013 – Sharjah Biennial 11, Re:emerge Towards a New Cultural Cartography, Sharjah, United Arab Emirates
