= Peyman Hooshmandzadeh =

Iranian photographer and author (born 1969)

- پیمان هوشمندزاده
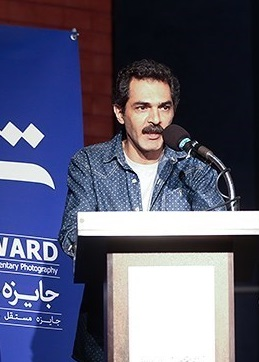
- Born: 1969 (age 56–57); Tehran, Iran
- Known for: Documentary photography

Peyman Hooshmandzadeh (born 1969 in Tehran; Persian: پیمان هوشمندزاده) is an Iranian photographer and author. He has published several books, won multiple photography awards, and held exhibitions worldwide.

== Education ==
He studied photography at the Islamic Azad the University of Tehran.

== Work ==
He is known for his series of photographs: "Cafe Shooka" and "Teahouse". Today he works as a photojournalist for several newspapers in Iran (Gozaresh e rooz Newspaper (works as a photo-editor), Isatis Monthly Magazine, Asia Newspaper and Goonagoon Newspaper (works as a photo-editor)) and abroad (Reuters, Panos Picture Agency, Polfoto Agency). He published a compilation of short stories "Two Dots" in April 2000 and "When two Sundays meet" in April 2001. A compilation of short notes "Alcohollypsis," was published in February 2004. He is also one of the founding members of 135 PHOTOS agency in Iran.

Photographs by Peyman have appeared in several personal and group exhibitions in Tehran: at the Museum of Contemporary Art, the Photography Biennal, and the Silk Road Gallery in Tehran. Two times in 1999 and 2000, has won the annual Press Photography Festival award in Tehran.

In November 2007, he participated in the First Biennale of Images of the World (Photoquai), organized by Musée du Quai Branly in Paris.
