= Rüti =

Rüti, which comes from the Old High German word riod, meaning "clearing", is a popular name for towns in the German speaking part of Switzerland. It can refer to the following:

- Rüti, Glarus in Glarus
- Rüti, Zürich in Zürich
  Rüti Reformed Church, an Evangelical Reformed church in the Swiss municipality of Rüti in the Canton of Zürich
  Rüti Monastery, a former Premonstratensian monastery, founded in 1206 and suppressed in 1525 on occasion of the Reformation in Zürich, situated in the municipality of Rüti in the canton of Zürich, Switzerland
- Rüti bei Büren in Berne
- Rüti bei Lyssach in Berne
- Rüti bei Riggisberg in Berne
- the hamlet of Rüti in the municipality of Hägglingen in Aargau
- the hamlet of Rüti in the municipality of Waldkirch SG in St. Gallen
- the hamlet of Rüti in the municipality of Affeltrangen in Thurgau
- the former municipality of Rüti im Prättigau (St. Antönien Rüti), now part of St. Antönien, Grisons

The names of the following places have the same origin:

- the municipality Rüte in Appenzell Innerrhoden
- the municipality Rüthi in St. Gallen
- the municipality Rüttenen in Solothurn
- the mountain Rütli
- place names with -rud (Norwegian), -ryd (Swedish) and -rød (Danish)
