= Matilda Aslizadeh =

Canadian artist

- Born: 1976 (age 49–50); Iran
- Education: University of British Columbia (BFA), University of California, San Diego (MFA)
- Known for: video, photography, installation

Matilda Aslizadeh (born 1976) is an Iranian-born Canadian visual artist and educator. She was born in Iran and moved to Greece after the Iranian Revolution in 1979. A few years later, her family settled in Vancouver, British Columbia.

Aslizadeh utilizes video, photography, and installation to rethink narrative structures such as the "classic fall and redemption narrative." She has also artistically and pedagogically explored the expansion of media archeology into non-Western practices "that incorporate old and new immersive technologies to understand how they enable engagement with other cosmologies that continue to co-exist and co-evolve in our global context of accelerated capitalism."

== Exhibitions ==
=== Solo exhibitions ===
- 2020: NEXT: Matilda Aslizadeh: Moly and Kassandra, at the Vancouver Art Gallery, in Vancouver, British Columbia
- 2018: Matilda Aslizadeh: Moly and Kassandra, at the Pari Nadimi Gallery, in Toronto, Ontario
- 2017: Resort, at the Foreman Art Gallery of Bishop’s University, in Sherbrooke, Quebec
- 2015: Matilda Aslizadeh: Trophy, at the Pari Nadimi Gallery, in Toronto, Ontario
- 2008: MATILDA ASLIZADEH, at the Pari Nadimi Gallery, in Toronto, Ontario

=== Group exhibitions ===
- 2018-2019: Believe, at the Museum of Contemporary Art (MOCA) in Toronto, Ontario
- 2012: Waiting For, at Centre A in Vancouver, British Columbia, curated by Makiko Hara
- 2009-2010: Diabolique / Diabolic, at the Dunlop Art Gallery in Regina, Saskatchewan; Galerie de l'UQAM in Montreal, Quebec; and the Military Museums in Calgary, Alberta
- 2010: The Stalking of Absence (vis-á-vis Iran), at Tokyo Gallery in Tokyo, Japan, curated by Shaheen Merali

== Installations ==
=== In a dark wood (2009) ===
In a dark wood, 2009, features an animated roulette-spin of B.C. trees, spaced as if they were Greek pillars. It is influenced by the turmoil of her youth and represents the artifacts of different ancient and living cultures that can be seen throughout her artistic practice. The two-channel work layers footage, "with short bursts of archival, black-and-white film footage culled from British Columbia's history" intertwining geographical locations.

=== Moly and Kassandra (2018) ===
Moly and Kassandra, 2018 was curated by Grant Arnold and exhibited at the Vancouver Art Gallery as part of the 2020 Capture Photography Festival's Selected Exhibition Program. The installation features three operatic performances by individual female figures in front of open pit mines, mimicking an amphitheater. Arnold describes the work as building a "correlation between the terms in which abstract economic systems are represented and the physical extraction of raw materials by precisely interweaving statistical charts, images of monumental excavations into the surface of the earth and scenes of operatic divination." Using references from 1979 fashion and history, the work reflects on the shift from Keynesian to neoliberal economic policies, and the consequences of economy in late capitalism. The year that it was shown at Capture, artist and writer Helena Wadsley reread the work as having ties to a developing association with COVID-19's emptiness.

== Award ==
2023 - Griffin Art Projects' 2023 North Shore Studio Art Residency Award Winner

== Artist collective ==
Aslizadeh is a founding member, along with several others, of the artist collective, Art Mamas. The Vancouver-based collective is made up of nine artists at different stages of both motherhood and their careers. It has met regularly since 2016 and seeks to facilitate a support system for artist caregivers while critically exploring the place of motherhood and care work within the dominant culture of art production. This includes a 2021 residency at Access Gallery, in which the gallery space was activated as a laboratory and included other creative producers who are mothers/parents from the local community and beyond. Conversations and screenings featured artists Margaret Dragu, Jin-me Yoon, and Elizabeth MacKenzie. The collective has also produced a 2023 publication titled art/mamas: Intermedial Conversations on Art, Motherhood and Caregiving.
