= Silk Road Gallery =

Silk Road Gallery (Persian: گالری راه ابریشم) is a [hotography gallery in Tehran, Iran. The gallery was founded by Anahita Ghabaian Etehadieh in December 2001.
