= Mandana Moghaddam =

Iranian-Swedish artist

- Born: 1962; Tehran, Iran
- Known for: sculpture, installation, video
- Notable work: Chelgis series, The Well, Sara's Paradise
- Website: http://mandana-moghaddam.com

Mandana Moghaddam is an Iranian-Swedish contemporary visual artist whose installation work was most notably exhibited in the 51st Venice Biennale. Affected by the Iranian Revolution, Moghaddam was granted asylum in Gothenburg, Sweden where she continues to work to this day. Her work covers such themes as alienation, communication, and gender. Working with these themes, Moghaddam creates works that attempt to bridge cultural boundaries, inspire intercultural dialogue, and memorialize oftentimes contentious aspects of Iranian life.

== Early life and education ==
Mandana Moghaddam was born in Tehran in 1962. At the age of 17, the Islamic Republic came to power in a revolution that later led to her father's execution as a member of the Shah's army. She was raised in the often hostile environment of Tehran, and was in her early twenties during the majority of the Iran–Iraq War (1980–88). Her education was disrupted and as a result of hostile conditions, she was forced to flee the country.

== Career ==
=== Influences ===
Moghaddam's exposure to unrest, strong nationalism, violence, and instability the Iranian revolution was to have great effect on Moghaddam's later works, as well as her own sense of identity. Moghaddam's later installations, specifically Sara's Paradise (2009), show that Moghaddam finds her identity not only in the memory of her country and people, but in a global sense of unity and reconciliation. This she reflects and promotes in her works, as an inspiration to dialogue, healing, and good will. In doing so Moghaddam recovers the broken sense of self and identity tied to her early years.

=== Significant works ===
==== Chelgis Series (2005) ====
The Chelgis series, based on an Iranian fairy tale, works with hair as a symbol of the experience of a woman in contemporary Iranian culture. The series is realized in five parts, each part utilizing a different medium and perspective on the locus of the series, hair. Moghaddam's use of natural hair in the installation is significant for creating a connection with her audience. She reveals hair as inextricably linked to gender and socially-held beliefs of beauty. According to ancient persian ideals, hair should be long, thick, and a rich raven color. She focuses on this ideal that Arabic women are expected to live up to. Even in modern Iranian culture women are obliged to cover their hair, preserve it, and keep it beautiful for their husbands. Works like her Chelgis installations overturn prototypical views of hair and women's relationship to their hair. Moghaddam controls the audience's view of hair in her art, revealing it as symbolic of the female plight, tied up with years of oppression and forced ideals, or even a symbol of liberation when cut off.

==== The Well (2008) ====
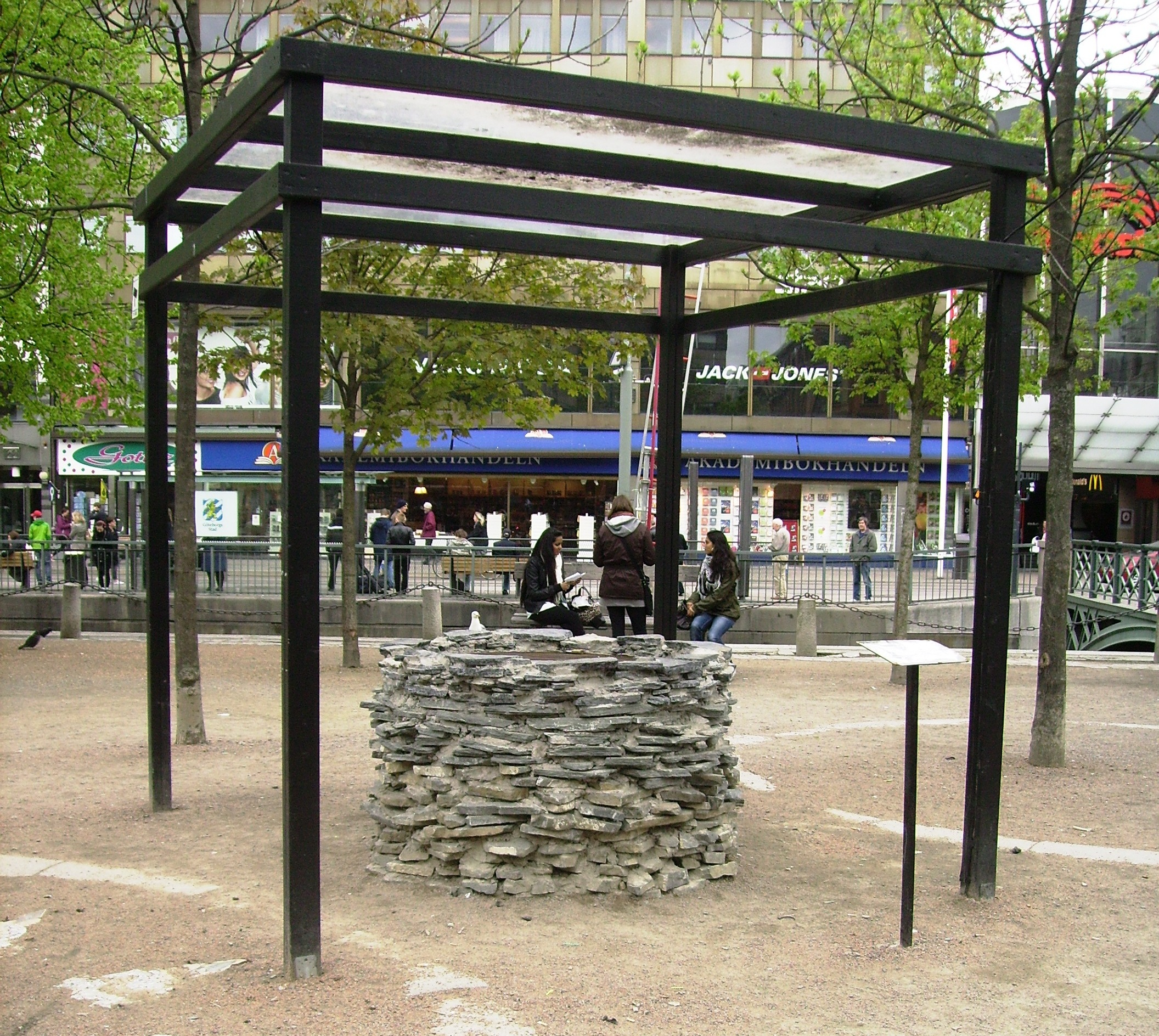
The Well, an interactive installation made by Mandana Moghaddam in Gothenburg

Moghaddam seeks reconciliation, rebirth, and hope through dialogue resulting from her works. Her installation, The Well, seeks to do so on an international scale. First premiered in Gothenburg, Sweden, on 25 September 2008, "The Well" is an ongoing project designed to be installed in different cities around the world. It was created to reflect the traditional scene of social interchange on an international scale by creating two connected wells in two very different countries. As evidenced in videos of audiences interacting with the wells, these installations serve as a curious attraction and an intriguing means of conversation for people who might never be engaged otherwise. Moghaddam's installation involves the construction of well structures in which are placed audio feeds to another well in another country. They serve to bridge international barriers in the simple action of establishing communication. In this way the well shows that people can come together despite political, religious, or cultural distance and boundaries.

==== Sara's Paradise (2009) ====
Sara's Paradise was first exhibited in the Brot Kunsthalle Gallery in Vienna, eventually moving to the gallery Arario New York. The show which contained the piece was entitled The Promise of Loss: A Contemporary Index of Iran, and was curated by Shaheen Merali. Merali described the exhibition as:

... a consolidation of many dashed hopes, a desire to build a shrine as well as to plant trees in the campus condemned to destruction. The artists enable both a reading of the situation and encouragement to cross the distance where the bitterness of loss reigns within the national moral. The Promise of Loss is organized to mine the huge ground of Iran. The connection of expertise to experience, the rhythm of its measures and the constancy of the artistic gaze into its shadows has made listening to the artists’ renditions more urgent.

Moghaddam's work is meant to promote reconciliation through a serious message of massacre and memorialization. It was created as an ode to the martyrs of the Iran–Iraq War, whose lives are commemorated in the Behesht e Zahra cemetery in Tehran.

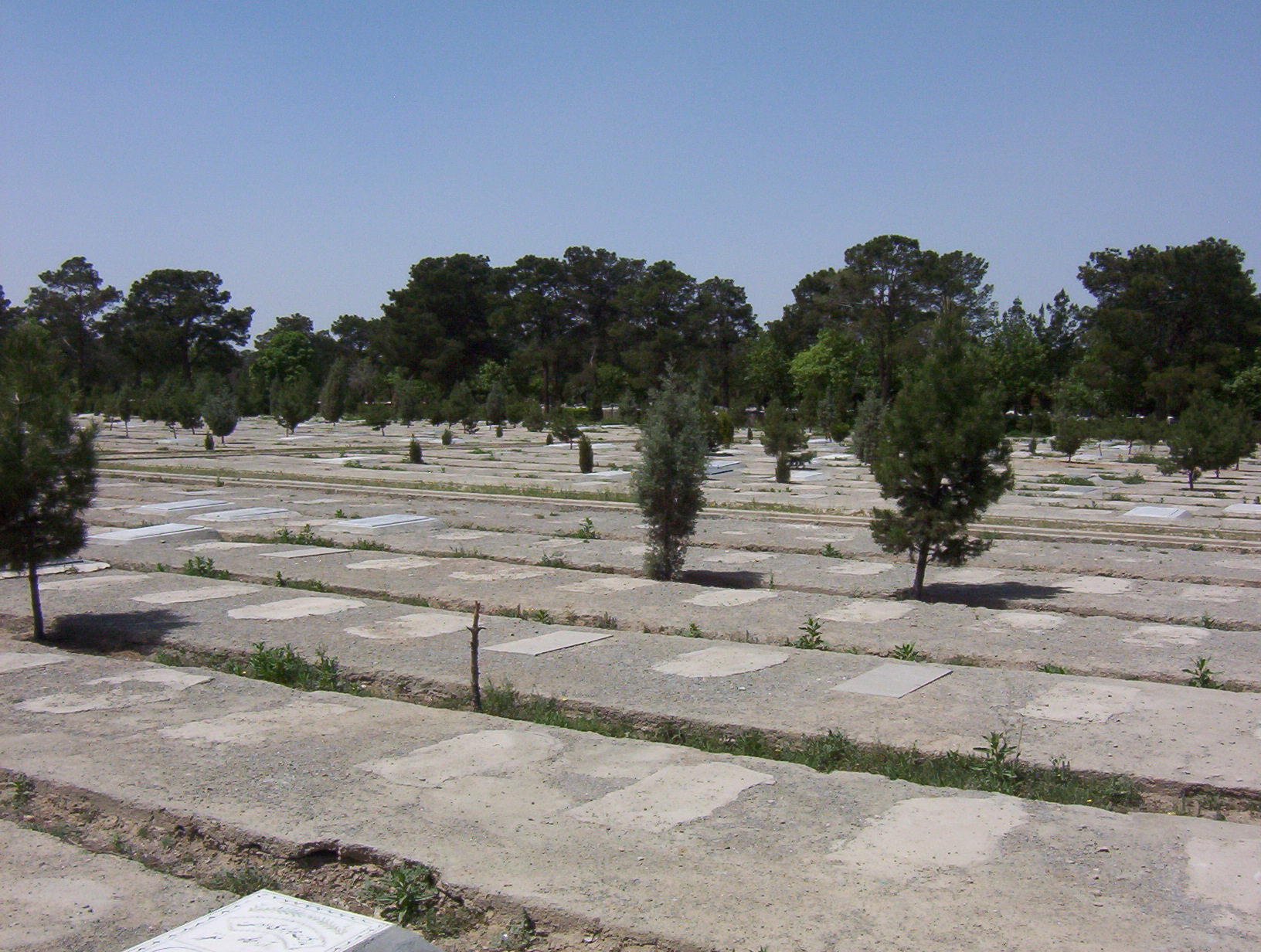
Graves in the Behesht-e Zahra cemetery, Tehran

The over 800,000 young lives taken in the war are represented in the installation by a central basin, out of which bleeds and bubbles a continuous stream of red water. The blood serves to represent these martyrs, lured to death by the promise of a place in paradise. The empty containers and barrels that surround the basin represent the eventual draining Iran's resources, notably their oil reserves. The containers are lit from within by a green light that simultaneously represents the modern green movement in Iran as well as hope and goodwill for Iran's future.

== See also ==
- List of Iranian artists
- List of Iranian women artists
- Iranian modern and contemporary art
