= Roti (disambiguation) =

Roti is a flatbread originating from the Indian subcontinent.

Roti or ROTI may also refer to:

- Roti (1942 film), an Indian Hindi-language film directed by Mehboob Khan
- Roti (1974 film), an Indian Hindi-language film directed by Manmohan Desai
- Roti (1988 film), a Pakistani Punjabi-language film directed by Idrees Khan
- Roti (album), an album by Gurdas Maan
- Rate of turn indicator, a navigational instrument on a ship
- Return on time invested, a productivity and efficiency metric
- "Rôti" (Hannibal), an episode of the television series Hannibal
- Rote Island, Indonesia
- Roti languages, a group of Timoric languages
- Roti dialect, a Bajaw language dialect
- Roti (wrap), a wrap style sandwich
- Roti (restaurant chain), an American fast casual mediterranean restaurant chain

== People with the surname ==
- Fred Roti (1920–1999), American politician

== See also ==
- Rotis, typeface
- Ruti (disambiguation)
