= Young–Yentes–Mattern Farm =

- U.S. National Register of Historic Places
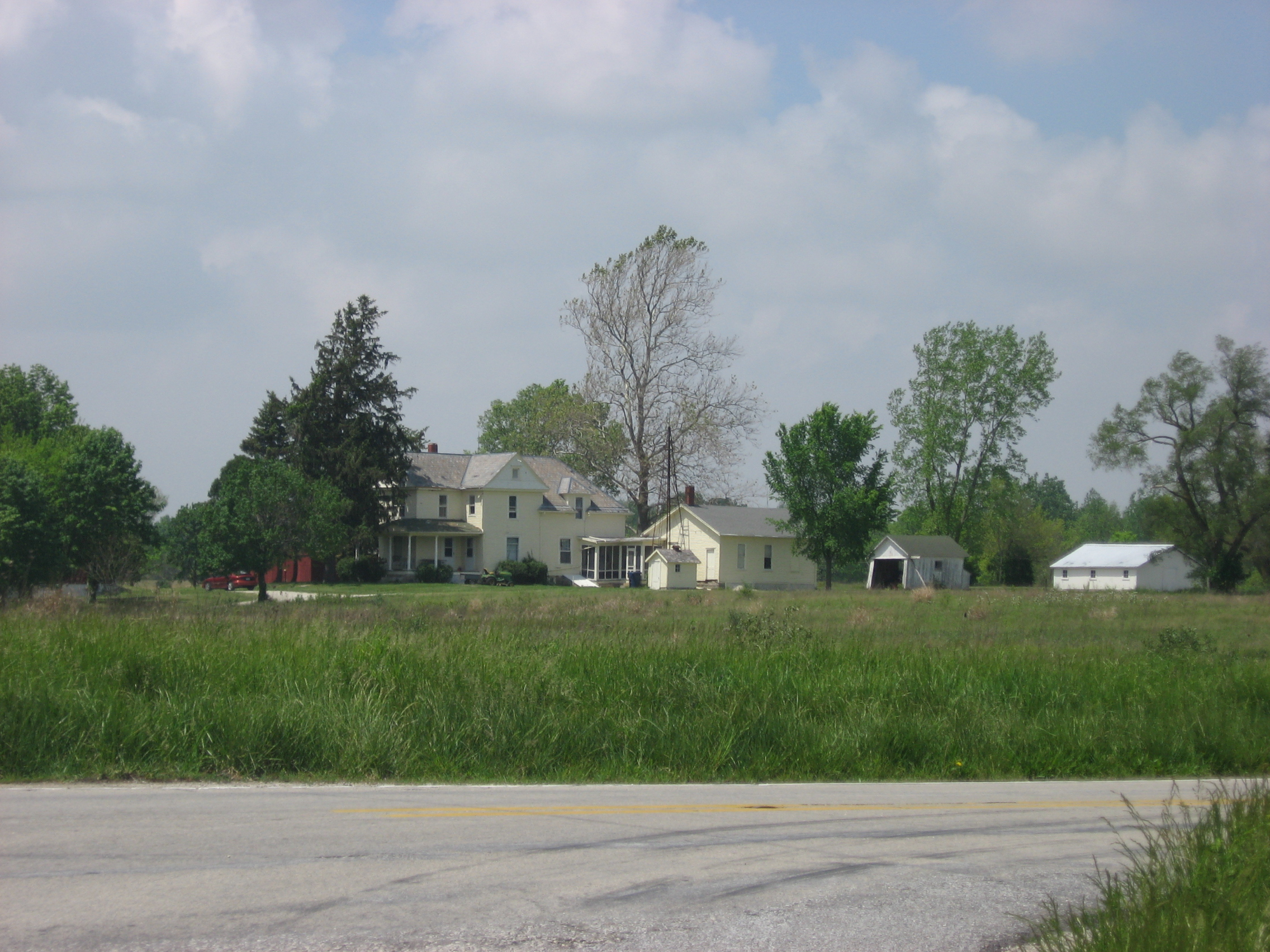
- Distant view of the farm

- Location within Indiana Location within the United States
- Location: Jct. of 900 W. Rd. and 400 N. Rd., west of Huntington in Dallas Township, Huntington County, Indiana
- Coordinates: 40°53′20″N 85°37′30″W
- Area: 80 acres (32 ha)
- Built: 1838
- Architectural style: Queen Anne, Bank barn
- NRHP reference No.: 01000361
- Added to NRHP: April 12, 2001

Young–Yentes–Mattern Farm, also known as Maple Grove Farmstead, is a historic home and farm located in Dallas Township, Huntington County, Indiana. The farm includes three residences: the original log house (1838), the former Dallas Township School Number 2 and used as a residence, and the Queen Anne main house built between 1896 and 1910. The two-story, frame main house has a front facing gable roof with fishscale shingles and a wraparound porch. Also on the property are a number of contributing outbuildings including the milk house, chicken house, garage, smokehouse, hog house, small barn, and large bank barn.

It was listed on the National Register of Historic Places in 2001.
