= Rajkamal Kahlon =

American artist based in Germany

Rajkamal Kahlon is an American artist based in Germany whose work draws on legacies of colonialism, often using the material culture, documentary material, and aesthetics of Western colonial archives.

== Biography ==
Kahlon was raised in California, the child of Pakistani-born Sikhs from India.

Kahlon holds an MFA from the California College of Art, where she was a Senior Lecturer in Fine Arts, and a BA from the University of California, Davis. She also studied at the Skowhegan School of Painting and Sculpture and the Whitney Independent Study Program.

== Exhibitions ==
Her work has been shown internationally at the Queens Museum, the Oakland Museum of California, the Bronx Museum of the Arts, the Taipei Biennial, the Haus der Kulturen der Welt, and more.

== Works ==
She is best known for her work "Did You Kiss the Dead Body?," a series of works based on autopsy reports and death certificates of Afghan and Iraqi men who died in American military prisons abroad which she obtained through an American Civil Liberties Union (ACLU) Freedom of Information Act request. The title for the project comes from Harold Pinter's poem "Death," which he recited upon receiving his 2005 Nobel Prize. She drew bodies and body parts on each report, then marbled the papers with ink, recalling, for her, microscopic human cells, and for others, the process of waterboarding. Kahlon's work illuminates and overlaps histories of science and medicine, imperialism, colonialism, and terror, and draws parallels between seemingly disparate moments in time and knowledge. The work was created while Kahlon was an artist-in-residence at the ACLU's New York headquarters.

Kahlon is one of a number of artists working with the documents and ethnographic materials related to the war on terror, including artist Jenny Holzer and Index of the Disappeared (a collaborative project of Chitra Ganesh and Mariam Ghani).

Four of her works, including "Ten thousand wiles and a hundred thousand tricks" from the "Did You Kiss the Dead Body?" series, are in the permanent collection of the Museum of Contemporary Art, Antwerp.

Miriam Oesterreich and Reinhard Spieler edited a critical monograph entitled Double Vision to accompany her 2012 eponymous exhibition at Rudolf-Scharpf-Galerie.
