= Ruti Sela =

Israeli video artist (born 1974)

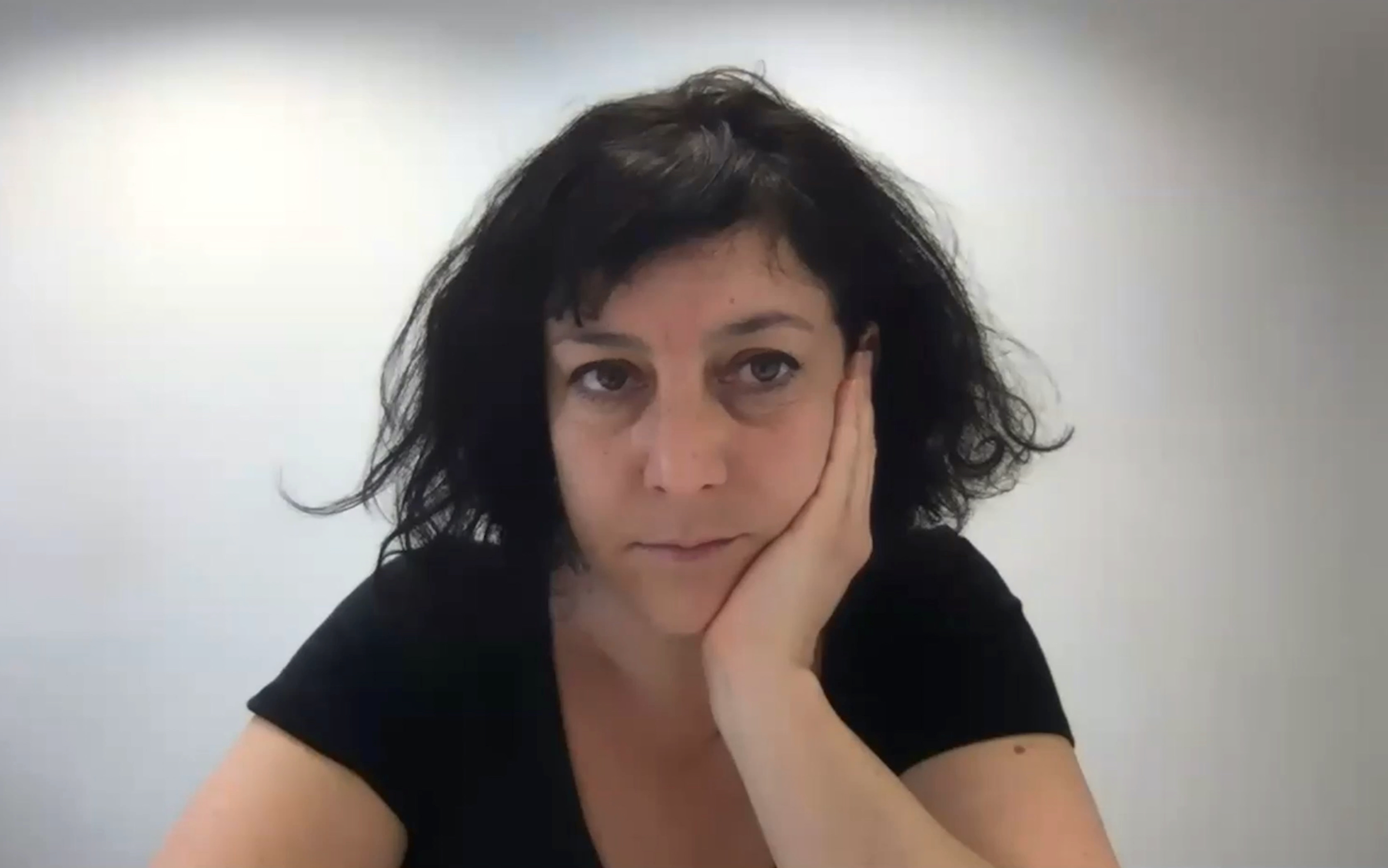

Ruti Sela, (Hebrew: רותי סלע; born 1974, in Jerusalem, Israel) is a video artist.

== Biography ==
She graduated from the Bezalel Academy of Art and Design, Jerusalem, and MFA studieds at the Film Department of the Tel Aviv University. Throughout 2011, she has been a guest resident at the Rijksakademie, Amsterdam. Her work has been shown internationally at various exhibitions and venues, including the 2006 Biennale of Sydney, the 2009 Istanbul Biennial, Berlin Biennial 2010, Manifesta 8 (2010), Israel Museum, Centre Pompidou, Kadist Art Foundation, Paris; Art in General, New York; Chelsea Art Museum, New York, Tel Aviv Museum, Tate Modern and Jeu de Paume. She has received a number of prizes and scholarships, among them the Minister of Culture Prize and the Anselm Kiefer prize.

In 2009 she initiated together with Maayan Amir "The Exterritory Project" on which they have won an award (2011) for young artist from the United Nations Educational, Scientific and Cultural Organization (UNESCO).

Sela teaches at HaMidrasha – Faculty of the Arts, Beit Berl College, Israel.

== Selected exhibitions ==
2021

- Speech Act, Fosdick-Nelson Gallery, Alfred, NY.
- Desktop, Tel Aviv Museum, Tel Aviv, Israel (project).
- 100% Legal, Barbur Gallery, Jerusalem, Israel.
- But Ears Have No Lids, the Philippine Contemporary Art Network(PCAN), Quezon, Philippines.
- AD/AD – Project Space, Hanover, Germany (Screening).

2020

- Marseille Jamilla, Hamidrasha Gallery, Tel Aviv, Israel

2019

- The Winners, Ashdod Museum, Israel
- Tabula Rasa, Bizaron Center, Israel

2018

- Out of Orders, Live Art Development Agency Virtual Gallery, London, UK.

2017

- Concepts of Subjectivities, El Instituto Cultural de León(ICL)/Galería Jesus Gallardo, Guanajuato, Mexico
- Image Blockade, Galerja Miroslav Krealjevic, Zagreb, Croatia.

2018

- Vos Désirs Sont Les Nôtres, Triangle France, Marseille, France
- Sunset, Tel Aviv Artists House, Tel Aviv, Israel
- The Land of Promise, The MODEM Modern and Contemporary Arts Center, Debrecen, Hungary
- Temporal Title, Petach Tikva Museum of Contemporary Art, Petach Tikva, Israel
- Trajectories, Villa Tamaris Art Center, La Seyne-sur-Mer, France
- Recovery Plan: Join or Die, Tel Aviv Museum, Tel Aviv, Israel

2017

- Staring Back at the Sun, WRO Art Center, Wroclaw, Poland (screening/exhibition series)
- Staring Back at the Sun, Koffler Centre of the Arts, Toronto, Canada
- Generate, Festival für elektronische Künste, Tübingen, Germany
- Woven and Untangled, New Video Works in the Tel Aviv Museum Collection, Israel.

2016

- False Flags, Pelican Bomb Gallery, New Orleans, U.S.
- Tanzquartier Wien, Austria.
- Staring Back at the Sun, Casa do Povo, São Paulo, Brazil.
- New Museum, New York, Rose Art Museum, Massachusetts, U.S.
- International House, Philadelphia, U.S.
- Zacheta National Gallery, Warsaw, Poland.
- Koffler Center of the Arts, Toronto, Canada.

2015

- New Museum Triennial, New York, U.S.
- Travestie für Fortgeschrittene, GfZK, Leipzig, Germany.
- The School of Kyiv – Kyiv Biennial, Ukraine.
- Secrets, Science Gallery, Dublin, Ireland.
- Stedelijk Museum Bureau, Amsterdam, Netherland.
- Image Blockade, CCA, Tel-Aviv, Israel.

2013

- For The Record, Tranzitdisplay, Prague, Czech Republic.

2014

- Bat Yam Museum, Israel.
- Festival d’Arts Contemporains des Comores, Union of Comoros, Africa.
- About the Tragic, Center for Contemporary Art, Sarajevo, Bosnia and Herzegovina.
- Spaceship Module, New Museum, New York, USA.
- Unusual Suspects, Les Vagamondes Festival, La Filature, France.
- Vidéogr@phie(s), Liège, Belgium.
- Forensis, HKW, Berlin, Germany.

2011

- BG-HOV-PWC, Kadist Foundation, Paris, France.
- “Beyond Guilt”, 126 Gallery, Galway, Ireland.
- “Beyond Guilt”, Contemporary Art Gallery Vancouver, Canada.

2010

- “Beyond Guilt”, 1646 Gallery, The Hague, the Netherlands.
- “Time to Dance”, Manifesta 8, Murcia, Spain.
- “El Palabrero”, Hamidrasha Gallery, Tel Aviv.

2008

- “Rare Medium”, Center for Contemporary Art, Tel-Aviv (artist curator).

2006

- “Cordova”, The Center for Contemporary Art Gallery, Tel Aviv, Israel.

== Selected group exhibitions ==
2016

- False Flags, Pelican Bomb Gallery, New Orleans, U.S.
- Tanzquartier Wien, Austria.
- Staring Back at the Sun:
  - Casa do Povo, São Paulo, Brazil.
  - New Museum, New York, Rose Art Museum, Massachusetts, U.S.
  - International House, Philadelphia, U.S.
  - Zacheta National Gallery, Warsaw, Poland.
  - Koffler Center of the Arts, Toronto, Canada.

2015

- New Museum Triennial, New York, U.S.
- Travesty Advanced, GFZK, Leipzig, Germany.
- The School of Kyiv – Kyiv Biennial, Ukraine.
- Secrets, Science Gallery, Dublin, Ireland.

2014

- Festival d’Arts Contemporains des Comores, Union of Comoros, Africa.
- About the Tragic, Center for Contemporary Art, Sarajevo, Bosnia and Herzegovina.
- Spaceship Module, New Museum, New York, USA.
- Unusual Suspects, Les Vagamondes Festival, La Filature, France.
- Vidéogr@phie(s), Liège, Belgium.
- Forensis, HKW, Berlin, Germany.

2013

- Changer d’image, Mumok, Vienna, Austria.
- Le Pont, MAC, Marseille Museum, France.
- The Way We Are, Gallery Zilberman Istanbul, Turkey.
- The Naked Man, Ludwig Museum, Budapest, Hungary.
- The Naked Man, Lentos Art Museum in Linz.
- Retour de Israel, Jeune Création, Marseille, France.
- Almedalsveckan, BAC – Baltic Art Center (screening), Sweden
- Brouillon – Bon Travail, Argos, Brussels, Belgium.
- Moments on moments, M HKA, Antwerp, Belgium.
- This and That, Kunsthaus Aussersihl (screening), Zurich, Switzerland.

2012

- Moments, History of Performances in 10 Acts, ZKM museum, Karlsruhe, Germany.
- Truth is concrete, Steirischer Herbst festival, Graz, Austria.
- The Intimate Autuman, Århus Kunstbygning, Copenhagen, Denmark.
- The Event, Birmingham, UK.
- Middle East Europe, CCA DOX, Prague, Czech Republic.
- Cittadellarte – Sharing Transformations, Kunsthaus Graz, Austria.
- Pathways into a Collection, Minsheng Art Museum, Hong Kong.
- Video Brazil, Brazil.
- Ici, La Ba, Michel Rein Gallery, Paris.
- Victims and Martyrs,Gothenburg Kunsthall, Sweden.

2011

- “Un’espressione Geografica”, Foneazione Sandretto Re Rebaudengo, Torino, Italy.
- Distance - Homonovos, Riga, ICA, London, Wounderbar, Newcastle. UK.
- ECHT? Künstlerhaus Stuttgart, Stuttgart, Germany.
- WeAreTheArtists, Kunsthalle Winterthur, Switzerland.
- Cheminements,Centre Photo Lectoure, France.

2010

- Berlin Biennial, Germany.
- “Neo-Barbarism”, Rothschild 69 Gallery, Tel Aviv.
- Mediation Biennial, Poznan, Poland.
- “Faux Amis, vidéothèque éphémère”, Jeu de Paume, Paris.
- “Police the Police”, Young Artists Biennial in Bucharest, Romania.
- Quando Si Parte, ASSAB-One, Milan, Italy.
- Mobile Archive, Museum of Art and Ideas, Hamburg, Germany.
- Darkroom, Institute of Art in Gdańsk.
- Museum of art and idea, Hamburg.
- Trembling Time(screening), Tate Modern.
- Selected Works from Istanbul Biennial, Museo D’arte Della Sicilia, palazzoriso, Italy.
- Overview, Haifa Museum, Israel.

2009

- 11th Istanbul Biennial, Turkey.
- Selected works from 11th Istanbul Biennial, Nova Gallery, Zagreb.
- “CPH:DOX“, the film festival, Copenhagen, Denmark.
- “Art TLV”, the 2nd Tel Aviv Biennial, Israel.
- “BTAT crossing”, Space Croix Barabgon, Toulouse, France.
- SCOPE New York 09.

2008

- “Festival des Urbaines”, Laussane, Switzerland.
- “Art TLV”, the 1st Tel Aviv Biennial, Israel.
- Video-Zone, the 4th Biennial of Video Art, Tel Aviv.
- Mittelmeer Biennial, Köln, Germany.
- “the tyranny of the transparent”, Minshar Gallery, Tel Aviv, Israel.
- “Life Stories”, TPW Gallery, Toronto, Canada.
- “Onlyconnect“, Chelsea Art Museum, New York.
- “Come to Israel”, Storefront Gallery, New York.
- “Rare Medium”, The Center for Contemporary Art, Tel Aviv, Israel.

2007

- “The Rear“, Herzeliya Biennial, Israel.
- “War and Cinema” Screening at Pompidou Center, Paris.
- Haifa Museum, Israel.

2006

- Sydney Biennial, Australia.
- “L.A. Freewaves”, Film Festival, Los Angeles.
- “Mini-Israel”, Israel Museum, Jerusalem, Israel.
- “8th Annual Video Marathon”, Art in General Gallery, New York.
- “Blanks”, The Center for Contemporary Art Gallery, Tel Aviv, Israel.
- “Serial Cases”, Exchange program between Israel, Croatia, Belgium, Austria, Turkey, Czech Republic, and Romania.
- ‘Identity in Crisis’, the new cultural association Ambasciata di Marte, Florence, Italy.
- “Dreams and Trauma” – Moving Images and the Promised Lands, The House of World Cultures, Berlin, Germany.

2005

- “Passion”, Villa Franchin Gallery, Mestre Venezia, Italy.
- Naples XII Biennial, Italy.
- “Transmediale”, Film festival, Berlin, Germany.
- “Power”, Israeli Art Festival, Tel Aviv, Israel.
- “Gazza”, The Minshar Gallery, Tel Aviv, Israel.
- “Hilchot Shchenim C”, The Israeli Center For Digital Art, Holon, Israel.

2004

- “Whores”, The Midrasha Gallery, Tel Aviv.
- Video-Zone, the 2nd Biennial of Video Art, Tel Aviv.
- “Hilchot Shchenim B”, The Israeli Center For Digital Art, Holon, Israel.
- “Winners”, group exhibition, Haifa Museum

2003

- “Affirmative Action”, group exhibition, Tel Aviv Museum

2002

- “TransChina” festival, Beijing/Shanghai, China.
- “Retrospective” Video Art Screening, Herzliya Museum of Art.
- Video-Zone, the 1st Biennial of Video Art, Tel Aviv.
- “vidéochroniques” festival, Marseille, France.

== Publications-books ==
- United States of Palestine-Israel, Exterritory Together with Maayan Amir, Ed. Joshoa Simion, Sternberg Press, New-York, 2011
- Volume 14 of ASPECT: The Chronicle of New Media Art.
- VIDEO ON THE LOOSE - Freewaves and 20 Years of Media Arts
- MULTITUDES, No 47, winter, Paris, 2011.
- CAPRICIOUS No. 12: The Protest issue, Ed. Emily Roysdon, New York, 2011.

== Awards ==
- 2019 The Pais Culture Fund.
- 2018 Award for an Established Video Artist, the Israeli Ministry of Culture and Sport.
- 2018 Artis Grant, Artis New York, NY.
- 2018 The Pais Culture Fund.
- 2017 UCI Illuminations
- 2017 The Chancellor’s Art & Culture Initiative support.
- 2015 Artis Grant.
- 2015 The Ostrovsky Family Fund.
- 2015 Tel Aviv Museum Collection.
- 2014 Rabinovich Art Foundation.
- 2014 The Ostrovsky Family Fund.
- 2013 The Pais Culture Fund.
- 2013 The Center for Contemporary Art Tel Aviv
- 2011 UNESCO Award for Young Artists.
- 2011 Encourage, The minister of education award.
- 2008-9 Wolf Foundation, Anselm Kiefer prize for young artist.
- 2009 VIDEO.IT/BJCEM – Skopje 2009, Torino, Italy.
- 2003 Yung Artist, The minister of education award.
- 2002 America-Israel Cultural Foundation.
- 2001 The art department of Bezalel award for excellent graduate.

== Videography ==
- Viewing Booth, 2021, 2:50 min.
- Desktop, 2020, 10:00 min.
- Marseille Jamilla, 2019, 27:10 min. (Collaboration with Roee Rosen)
- Hugs#2, 2017, 1:25 min.
- Image Blockade, 2015 (with Maayan Amir), 38:30 min.
- Scenarios Preparations, 2015 (with Maayan Amir), 35:00 min, Holland – Greece.
- El Yuma, 2014, 39:00 min, Cuba.
- For The Record, 2013, 18:00 min, Jerusalem.
- Credit Point, 2012, 12:45 min, Jerusalem.
- The Witness, 2012, 10:00 min, ZKM, Karlsruhe, Germany.
- Extras, 2012, 2:00 min Loop, Jerusalem.
- Webcam, 2011, 10:28 min.
- Commune Sense, 2011 (with Maayan Amir), 18:00 min, Umbria, Italy.
- CTD curated by Tranzit, 2010–11, 30:00 min, Murcia, Spain.
- Commune Sense, 2011 (with Maayan Amir), 18:00 min, Umbria, Italy.
- Webcam, 2011, 10:28 min, Web.
- El Palabrero, 2010, 35:00 min, Buenos Aires – Tel Aviv.
- Nothing To Lose, 2010, 8:00 min, Toulouse, France.
- Gringo, 2010,10:00 min, Jaffa.
- People Will Comply, (with Ruti Sela's video class students from Avni Art Institute), 2010, 11:45 min.
- History of Violence, (with Ruti Sela's video class students from Haifa University), 2009, 11:34 min.
- America#1, 2008, 2:30 min, New York.
- Someone Feels That Someone is Missing, 2008, 10:00 min, Eilat-Tel Aviv.
- Nothing Happened, 2007, 23:00 min, Tel Aviv.
- Steps, 2006, 2:00 min, Tel Aviv. The Studio, 2007, 2:00 min, Tel Aviv.
- Europa, Video Installation, 2006, 4:00 min Loop, Cairo, Egypt.
- One Shot in China, 2005, 2:14 min, China.
- Pride Parade, 2005, 3:00 min, Jerusalem.
- Ouwi, 2005 (with Lior Waterman), 12:00 min, Tel Aviv.
- Aley zahav named after Aliza Begin, 2005, 6:00 min, Tel Aviv.
- Beyond Guilt – The Trilogy, 2003-5 (with Maayan Amir), 42:00 min, Tel Aviv.
- Sharon & Arafat, 2004, 1:00 min, Amman, Jordan.
- Loopolice, 2003, 6:40 min, Tel Aviv (with Clil Nadav).
- Livnot, 2003, 3:00 min, Jerusalem.
- E R Sun Set, 2003, (with Gilad Ratman & Lior Waterman), 3:00 min, Beijing, China.
- The Next Picture I Found in the Garbage, 2003, 1:00 min, Tel Aviv.
- Cordova, 2002-3 (2 chapters, collaboration with 5 artists), 50:00 min, Tel Aviv.
- The Flies, 2002, 4:00 min, Tel Aviv.
- Rudiguer Coming to Israel, 2002, 10:00 min, Tel Aviv.
- House Arrest, 2002, 8:00 min, Tel Aviv.
- Money-Comio, 2002, 5:00 min, Tel Aviv.
- Siberian Dog, 2001, 4:00 min, Tel Aviv.
- Una Proyeccion Solamente, 2001, 12:00 min, Valencia, Spain.
- Moom (defect in the neck) 2000, 4:00 min, Jerusalem.
- Porno 2000, 6:00 min, Jerusalem.
- Hugs, 1999, 8:00 min (No sound), Jerusalem.
