= Mai Ghoussoub =

Lebanese writer, artist, publisher, human rights activist (1952–2007)

- Born: November 2, 1952; Beirut, Lebanon
- Died: February 17, 2007 (aged 54); London, United Kingdom
- Occupations: Writer, artist, publisher and human rights activist

Mai Ghoussoub (Arabic: مي غصوب; 2 November 1952, in Beirut – 17 February 2007, in London) was a Lebanese writer, artist, publisher and human rights activist. She was the co-founder in London of the Saqi bookshop and publishing house.

== Life ==
Her father, Raymond Ghoussoub, a Maronite Christian, was a professional footballer. She studied at the French lycée in Beirut, then mathematics at the American University of Beirut, and French literature at the Lebanese University, and later sculpture at Morley College and the Henry Moore Studio in London.

She was a Trotskyite at the start of the Lebanese Civil War in 1975, but soon became disillusioned and moved on to humanitarian work, establishing two medical dispensaries in a poor Muslim area after the doctors had left and the pharmacies had closed.

She lost an eye in 1977, after her car was hit by a shell while taking someone to hospital. She moved to London to be treated, and spent time in Paris, where she worked as a journalist for Arab newspapers. She wrote Comprendre le Liban with her childhood friend André Gaspard, under the pseudonyms Selim Accaoui and Magida Salman.

In 1979, she founded the Al Saqi bookshop in Westbourne Grove, London, with Gaspard, the first London bookshop to specialise in Arabic works. They began to publish books in Arabic in 1983. They sold the Serpent's Tail imprint to Pete Ayrton in 1987, but continued with the Saqi and Telegram imprints. An Arabic publishing house, Dar al-Saqi, was founded in Beirut in 1990.

She was a feminist, publishing works on a range of controversial issues and producing challenging artistic installations. She wrote for openDemocracy.

Her autobiographical book, Leaving Beirut: women and the wars within, was published in 1998. She was passionately opposed to censorship, arguing in her 2006 play Texterminators, performed at the Lyric Theatre, Hammersmith, and Dominion Theatre in London, the Unity Theatre, Liverpool, and the Marignan Theatre in Beirut, that "Words don't kill; humans do."

== Family ==
She married twice. She married the Lebanese writer Hazem Saghieh in 1991. She died of heart failure in London on 17 February 2007, aged 54. She was survived by her father, mother, Maggie Ghoussoub, sister, Houda, and husband, Hazem Saghieh.

== Works ==
- Imagined Masculinities: Male identity and culture in the modern Middle East. London: Saqi. 2000. ISBN 978-0-86356-042-2.
- Leaving Beirut. Saqi. 1998. reprint, Saqi, 2007, ISBN 978-0-86356-676-9
- Rebecca O'Connor, ed. (2008). Selected Writings. Saqi.
- Haideh Moghissi, ed. (2005). "Feminism - or the Eternal Masculine - in the Arab World". Women and Islam: Women's movements in Muslim societies. Taylor & Francis. ISBN 978-0-415-32421-2.
