= Yvette Mattern =

Puerto Rican visual artist

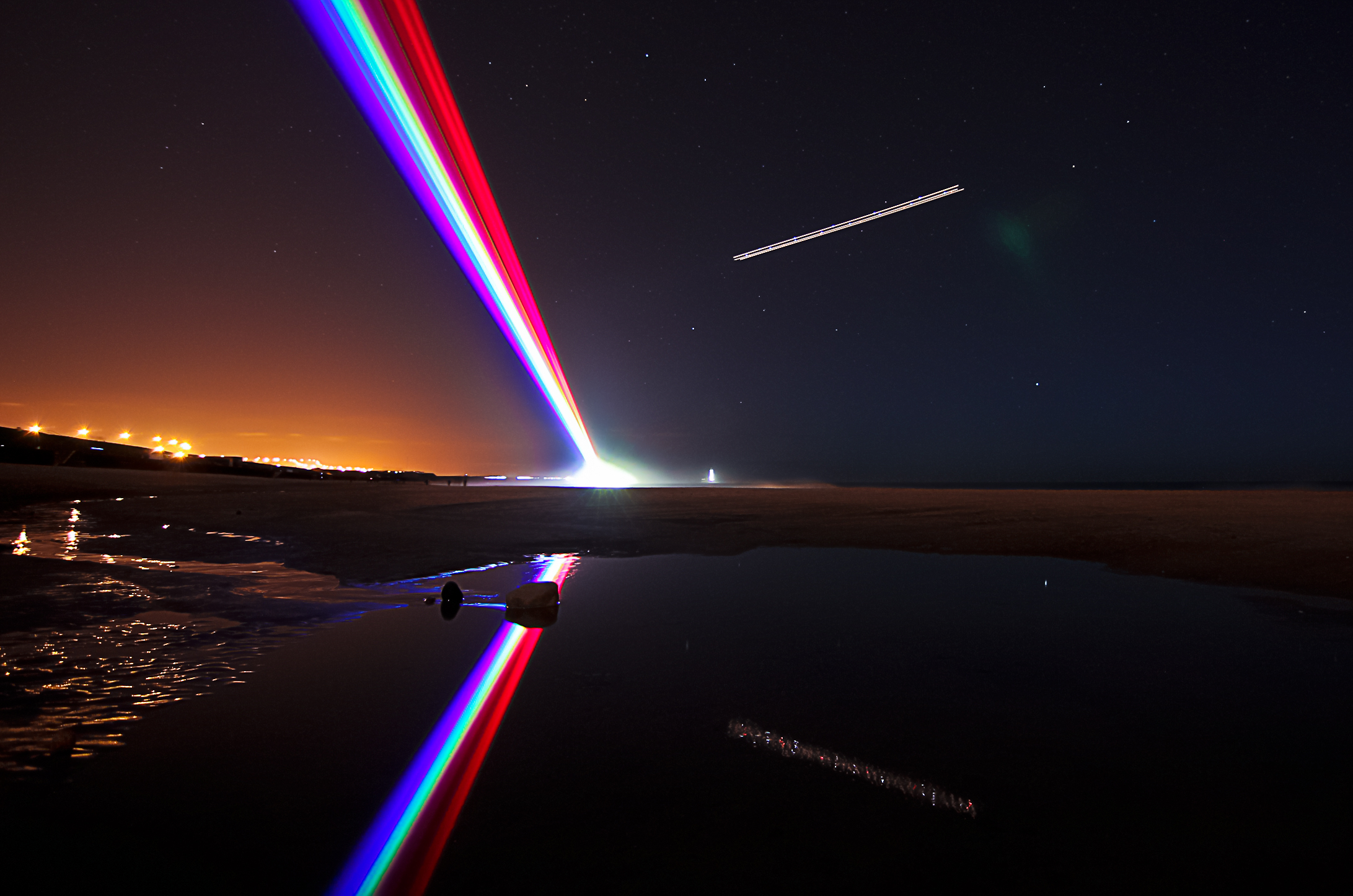
Global Rainbow in Northern England

Yvette Mattern (born San Juan, Puerto Rico) is a New York and Berlin based visual artist whose work has an emphasis on video and film, which frequently intersects performance, public art and sculpture. Her work has been exhibited internationally.

== Education ==
Mattern studied and has a Master of Fine Arts degree from Columbia University.

== Global Rainbow ==
Her ongoing monumental laser light installation Global Rainbow has been presented over ten times since 2009 including: launching the London 2012 Cultural Olympiad in the Northeast, Northwest England and Northern Ireland, Transmediale 2010 in Berlin, Germany, Nantes, Metz and Toulouse France, New York City with Art Production Fund, New Haven, CT and a special presentation in Pittsburgh with Lightwave International. It 2012 it was projected above Manhattan skies as "an uplifiting light on those destroyed by the terror and darkness cast by Superstorm Sandy." It was also featured in Toronto, Ontario for Nuit Blanche in 2014.

== Personal life ==
Yvette Mattern is married to Georg Polke, son of German Painter Sigmar Polke (2014–present). Yvette Mattern has one son, Maximilian Mattern-Knuesel and three step-children with Georg Polke. She lives between Berlin, Germany and the United States.
