= Yashar Samimi Mofakham =

Iranian artist, curator (born 1979)

- یاشار صمیمی مفخم
- Born: 1979 (age 46–47); Tehran, Iran
- Occupations: Visual artist, author, curator
- Known for: Visual artist, writer, curation of Iranian modern and contemporary art
- Partner: Tarlan Rafiee
- Mother: Hengameh Mofid
- Relatives: Idin Samimi Mofakham (brother)

Yashar Samimi Mofakham (Persian: یاشار صمیمی مفخم; born in 1979 in Tehran, Iran) is an Iranian curator, visual artist, author, archivist, and art collector. He is recognized for promoting Iranian modern and contemporary art internationally.

Samimi Mofakham was born into an artistic family; his mother, Hengameh Mofid, is an Iranian dramatist, and his father, Kambiz Samimi Mofakham, was a theatre director, scenographer and puppeteer. He often works in collaboration with his partner, Tarlan Rafiee.

== Career ==
=== Artistic career ===
Samimi Mofakham began his professional career as a visual artist in 2001 when he participated in a group exhibition in Tehran. Since then, his paintings and prints have been showcased in numerous exhibitions across Iran, Italy, the UK, the USA, France, Austria, Denmark, Armenia, and Dubai. His works are included in prestigious institutional collections, such as the Los Angeles County Museum of Art (LACMA), the British Museum, and the Ducal Palace of Mantua.

Alongside his work as a visual artist, he has served as a theater scenographer and received awards in this area. Additionally, he was twice selected as an award-winning artist by the British Art Medal Society.

He symbolically represents contemporary political issues in Iran—especially those he has personally witnessed and experienced—through his artworks.

=== Curating & Writing ===
Samimi Mofakham started his curatorial career with Selfdom: A Personal Project in 2010 in Tehran. This show presented self portrait works by contemporary Iranian artists reflecting on their identity and place in modern Iran.

In 2013, he co-curated the "Calling Project" with Iranian curator Tarlan Rafiee and British curator John Phillips. Over 30 renowned Iranian and British artists were included, and the exhibition traveled between Tehran and London.

He also co-curated the exhibition Karnameh; Visual Culture of Iranian Children at the Tehran Museum of Contemporary Art, which became one of the museum's largest and most attended shows.

He has also served as the artistic advisor for two exhibitions at the Tehran Museum of Contemporary Art: the exhibition A Retrospective of Farideh Lashai, curated by Germano Celant, and the exhibition Lions of Iran by Parviz Tanavoli.

In 2020, in collaboration with Tarlan Rafiee, he curated an exhibition titled "Trost der Liebenden" (Solace of Lovers) at the Tiroler Landesmuseum Ferdinandeum in Austria. The exhibition showcased Qajar-period works of art collected by Albert Joseph Gasteiger Khan alongside contemporary works by Iranian artists, including Parviz Tanavoli, Jazeh Tabatabai, Reza Bangiz, Farah Ossouli, Narges Hashemi, Mazdak Ayyari, and Khosrow Sinai. A companion book with the same title, co-authored with Rafiee, was also published by the museum.

In 2008, Samimi Mofakham and Rafiee founded the Bread & Salt Projects, dedicated to archiving and documenting modern and contemporary Iranian art.

He has been also invited as a speaker at events hosted by prominent institutions—including the British Museum (on the late artist Farideh Lashai), the Iran Heritage Foundation (on Persian modernist art), the Victoria & Albert Museum (on contemporary Iranian art), and the Cité Internationale des Arts in Paris (on historical–cultural ties between Iran and France).

He explores the cultural-historical and political issues of Iran in his writings and curatorial projects by focusing on the early modernism in Iran (19th century–Qajar era) through to the late modernism (Pahlavi era). Historically, he traces the trajectory that today’s Iran has followed, examining it as a cultural and social process over the past century.

== Curated exhibitions ==
- Selfdom / a personal project, 2011, with Tarlan Rafiee, Tehran, Iran
- Tehran Calling: London, 2013, with Tarlan Rafiee, LPS, London, UK
- Parviz Tanavoli’s Exercise Writing: 50 years of Iranian Pop Art, 2016, with Tarlan Rafiee, Shahrivar Gallery, Tehran, Iran
- Parviz Tanavoli’s Universal Icons: 50 years of Iranian Pop Art, 2016, with Tarlan Rafiee, Shahrivar Gallery, Tehran, Iran
- RTL:LTR, an exchange exhibition between Iran and Austria (right to left, left to right), with Tarlan Rafiee, Peter Assmann, and CO:K; traveling exhibit to the Galerie Forum in Wels, Austria, 2016; the Artmark Galerie in Wien, Austria, 2016; the Lajevardi Foundation, in Tehran, Iran, 2016; and the Museum of Contemporary Art, Isfahan, in Iran, 2016–2017
- Plants: Recent works by Parvaneh Etemadi, 2017, with Tarlan Rafiee, Dastan Gallery, Dastan Oustside, Tehran, Iran.
- The Multiplicity, Gallery Dastan, Tehran, 2017
- Karnameh; Visual Culture of Iranian Children, Tehran Museum of Contemporary Art, 2016
- Iran Print -01, 2019, Meem Gallery, Dubai, UAE
- Solace of Lovers: Trost Der Liebenden, 2020–2021, with Tarlan Rafiee, Tyrolean State Museum, Innsbruck, Austria

== Bibliography ==
=== By Samimi Mofakham ===
- Samimi Mofakham, Yashar; Rafiee, Tarlan; Assmann, Peter; Pereña, Helena (2020). Solace of Lovers: Trost Der Liebenden. Innsbruck, Austria: Haymon Verlag, Tiroler Landesmuseen Betriebsgesellschaft m.b.H. ISBN 978-3-7099-8119-1.
- Samimi Mofakham, Yashar; Rafiee, Tarlan (2018). Macmillan, Louisa (ed.). Good morning... Good night. Cinque artiste e una curatrice (in Italian and English) (1st ed.). Italy: Tre Lune Edizioni. ISBN 9788889832813.
- Samimi Mofakham, Yashar (2016). Parviz Tanavoli's Universal Icons: 50 years of Iranian Pop Art (in Persian and English) (1st ed.). Tehran, Iran: Shahrivar Gallery.
- Samimi Mofakham, Yashar; Poorhosein; Bakhtiyari (2016). Karnameh; Visual Culture of Iranian Children (in Persian and English) (1st ed.). Tehran, Iran: Tehran Museum of Contemporary Art.
- Samimi Mofakham, Yashar; Rafiee, Tarlan; Traeger, Verena (2016). LTR:RTL - RTL:LTR (in Persian and English) (1st ed.). Tehran, Iran: Contemporary Art Publications.

=== About Samimi Mofakham ===
- Golestaneh, Ali (2012). Tehran Art: A Popular Revolution. Contemporary Art Publications. ISBN 9789948164746.
- Noyce, Richard (2014). Printmaking Off the Beaten Track. Bloomsbury Visual Arts. ISBN 978-1408156728.
- Porter, Venetia (2016). Iranian Voices Catalogue. British Museum.
- Fancy, M. (2016). "A celebration of 50 years of Pop art in Iran". Canvas Magazine. 4 (12). UAE: Canvas.
- Harrison, Kate; Leavitt Bourne, Marcy (2017). Contemporary Art Medals (1st ed.). London, UK. ISBN 9780995788404.
- Porter, Venetia; Tripp, Charles; Morris, Natasha (2020). Reflections: Contemporary Art of the Middle East and North Africa. British Museum. ISBN 978-0714111957.
- L'Occaso, Stefano (2022). Catalogo delle nuove acquisizioni 2012-2022 (in Italian) (1st ed.). Italy: Editoriale Sometti. ISBN 978-88-7495-863-4.
- Mousavi, F. (2024). "Archives as forms of resistance". Journal of Visual Art Practice. 23 (1). Taylor & Francis: 65–78. doi:10.1080/14702029.2024.2305526.

== See also ==
- List of Iranian artists
- List of Iranian writers
- List of painters
- List of people from Tehran
