= Tarlan Rafiee =

Iranian artist, curator (born 1980)

- طرلان رفیعی
- Born: 1980 (age 45–46); Tehran, Iran
- Occupations: Visual artist, curator
- Known for: Painting, installation art, writer, curation of Iranian contemporary art
- Partner: Yashar Samimi Mofakham

Tarlan Rafiee (born 1980; Persian: طرلان رفیعی) is an Iranian visual artist, art curator, archivist, and art collector. She is known for her contributions to Iranian modern and contemporary art.

Rafiee is regarded as an influential female figure in contemporary Iranian art. Her work, ranging across painting, printmaking, installation, and sculpture, reflects pressing social concerns, particularly issues surrounding women in the Middle East. In addition to her artistic practice, she is also recognised as an international curator and researcher, with a primary focus on the role of women in Iran’s cultural and artistic history.

== Career ==
=== Artwork ===
Rafiee embarked on her career as an artist in 2001, when she participated in a group exhibition in Tehran. Since then, she has exhibited her work in several group exhibitions across Iran, as well as in Dubai, Austria, France, Italy, the United States, Denmark, and Armenia.

Throughout her career, Rafiee has explored a variety of spaces and mediums in her artistic practice. While her work spans painting, printmaking, installation, and sculpture, a consistent feature across these forms is her pop-inflected approach to subject matter and her critical engagement with the status of women in the Middle East, particularly in Iran.

She frequently incorporates arrangements of images and portraits of prominent women—artists, writers, politicians, intellectuals, and actresses—alongside elements such as architecture, Persian miniature painting, floral and bird motifs, and similar iconography. Through these compositions, she explores the influence of women across various fields, especially within the gendered and patriarchal context of the Middle East. Her work consistently conveys a vision of women’s liberation from prevailing stereotypes and cultural constraints.

Her notable exhibitions include Cars: Accelerating the Modern World (2013) at the Victoria and Albert Museum in London; Iranian Voices (2017), curated by Venetia Porter at the British Museum in London; and Solace of Lovers: Trost Der Liebenden (2020–2021) at the Tyrolean State Museum in Innsbruck Austria, which she also co-curated.

In December 2022, the Victoria and Albert Museum featured a work by Tarlan Rafiee, part of its permanent collection, alongside pieces by Monir Shahroudy Farmanfarmaian, Shadi Ghadirian, Gohar Dashti, and Newsha Tavakolian. These works were highlighted on the museum’s social media platforms as key pieces from its collection on the theme of women and femininity, in a gesture of support for Iranian women.

Alongside her professional roles as a curator and visual artist, she has also worked as a children’s book illustrator and as a designer and maker of artistic medals. One of these medals, conceived as an art object, is held in the permanent collection of the British Museum.

Rafiee's artworks are housed in international collections, including the Los Angeles County Museum of Art, the British Museum, the Victoria and Albert Museum, Ducal Palace, Mantua, and the Tyrolean State Museum.

=== Curator ===
Rafiee initiated her curatorial career with the "Calling Project" in 2013, facilitating an exchange exhibition between British and Iranian artists. Since then, she has curated numerous exhibitions in Iran, Dubai, Austria, and Italy.

The issue of women and their role in the flourishing of cultures is a central theme in Rafiee’s curatorial projects and written works. She particularly explores this subject within the context of Iranian culture and the broader Persianate world. By juxtaposing literary and cultural elements with historical female figures and modern or contemporary Iranian artists, she offers new interpretations of Iranian art. Rafiee has also addressed these topics in numerous essays and scholarly articles.

Notable among her projects is Good Morning... Good Night. Five artists and a curator from Iran held at the Ducal Palace, Mantua, where she served as both curator, and wrote the accompanying exhibition book. It exhibited works from Iranian female artists, including Parvaneh Etemadi, Farah Ossouli, Nargess Hashemi, and Rozita Sharafjahan. The same exhibition was invited to take place at the Castello del Monferrato in Casale Monferrato in Italy.

Another exhibition in her career is Solace of Lovers: Trost Der Liebenden (2020–2021), a collaborative curation effort with her spouse, Yashar Samimi Mofakham, and the state museum director, Peter Assmann, for the Tyrolean State Museum. In this exhibition, they presented the historical collection of Albert Joseph Gasteiger of Qajar art, as well as Iranian masters, including Parviz Tanavoli, Jazeh Tabatabai, Reza Bangiz, Farah Ossouli, Nargess Hashemi, Mazdak Ayari, and Khosrow Sinai. Rafiee co-curated the exhibition, and co-wrote the 2020 exhibition book under the same title.

In 2008, she co-founded Bread & Salt Projects, a curatorial project as well as an extended archive and collection of Iranian modern and contemporary art in order to preserve the documents of the Iranian modern and contemporary art.

Rafiee has been invited to give lectures or participate in panel discussions about the Iranian modern and contemporary art by the British Museum, the Iran Heritage Foundation, and the Victoria and Albert Museum.

She often has worked alongside her spouse, Yashar Samimi Mofakham.

== Curated exhibitions ==
- Selfdom / a personal project, 2011, with Yashar Samimi Mofakham, Tehran, Iran
- Tehran Calling: London, 2013, with Yashar Samimi Mofakham, LPS, London, UK
- Parviz Tanavoli’s Exercise Writing: 50 years of Iranian Pop Art, 2016, with Yashar Samimi Mofakham, Shahrivar Gallery, Tehran, Iran
- Parviz Tanavoli’s Universal Icons: 50 years of Iranian Pop Art, 2016, with Yashar Samimi Mofakham, Shahrivar Gallery, Tehran, Iran
- RTL:LTR, an exchange exhibition between Iran and Austria (right to left, left to right), with Yashar Samimi Mofakham, Peter Assmann, and CO:K; traveling exhibit to the Galerie Forum in Wels, Austria, 2016; the Artmark Galerie in Wien, Austria, 2016; the Lajevardi Foundation, in Tehran, Iran, 2016; and the Museum of Contemporary Art, Isfahan, in Iran, 2016–2017
- Plants: Recent works by Parvaneh Etemadi, 2017, with Yashar Samimi Mofakham, Dastan Gallery, Dastan Oustside, Tehran, Iran.
- Good Morning... Good Night. Cinque artiste e una curatrice dall'Iran (English:Good Morning... Good Night. Five artists and a curator from Iran), 2018, Castello Di Moferrato, Casale Monferrato, Italy
- Good Morning... Good Night. Cinque artiste e una curatrice dall'Iran (English:Good Morning... Good Night. Five artists and a curator from Iran), 2018, Palazzo Ducale di Mantova, Mantova, Italy
- Iran Print -01, 2019, Meem Gallery, Dubai, UAE
- Solace of Lovers: Trost Der Liebenden, 2020–2021, Tyrolean State Museum, Innsbruck, Austria

== Bibliography ==
=== By Rafiee ===
- Tarlan, Rafiee; Samimi Mofakham, Yashar (2018). Macmillan, Louisa (ed.). Good morning... Good night. Cinque artiste e una curatrice (in Italian and English) (1st ed.). Italy: Tre Lune Edizioni. ISBN 9788889832813.
- Rafiee, Tarlan; Samimi Mofakham, Yashar; Assmann, Peter; Pereña, Helena (2020). Solace of Lovers: Trost Der Liebenden. Innsbruck, Austria: Haymon Verlag, Tiroler Landesmuseen Betriebsgesellschaft m.b.H. ISBN 978-3-7099-8119-1.
- Rafiee, Tarlan (2016). Parviz Tanavoli; Exercise Writing: 50 years of Iranian Pop Art (in Persian and English) (1st ed.). Tehran, Iran: Shahrivar Gallery.
- Rafiee, Tarlan; Samimi Mofakham, Yashar; Traeger, Verena (2016). LTR:RTL - RTL:LTR (in Persian and English) (1st ed.). Tehran, Iran: Contemporary Art Publications.

=== About Rafiee ===
- Golestaneh, Ali (2012). Tehran Art: A Popular Revolution. Contemporary Art Publications. ISBN 9789948164746.
- Noyce, Richard (2014). Printmaking Off the Beaten Track. Bloomsbury Visual Arts. ISBN 978-1408156728.
- Porter, Venetia (2016). Iranian Voices Catalogue. British Museum.
- Fancy, M. (2016). "A celebration of 50 years of Pop art in Iran". Canvas Magazine. 4 (12). UAE: Canvas.
- Harrison, Kate; Leavitt Bourne, Marcy (2017). Contemporary Art Medals (1st ed.). London, UK. ISBN 9780995788404.
- Porter, Venetia; Tripp, Charles; Morris, Natasha (2020). Reflections: Contemporary Art of the Middle East and North Africa. British Museum. ISBN 978-0714111957.
- Mohajer, S. (2020). Portrait of Painter (in Persian) (1st ed.). Tehran, Iran: Vista Pub. ISBN 9786009994441.
- Halasa, Malu (2023). Voices and Art from the Women in Iran (1st ed.). London, UK: Saqi Books. ISBN 978-0863569722.
- L'Occaso, Stefano (2022). Catalogo delle nuove acquisizioni 2012-2022 (in Italian) (1st ed.). Italy: Editoriale Sometti. ISBN 978-88-7495-863-4.

== See also ==
- List of Iranian artists
- List of Iranian writers
- List of painters
- List of people from Tehran
- List of women artists
- List of women writers
