= Jakob Eduard Polak =

Austrian physician (1818–1891)

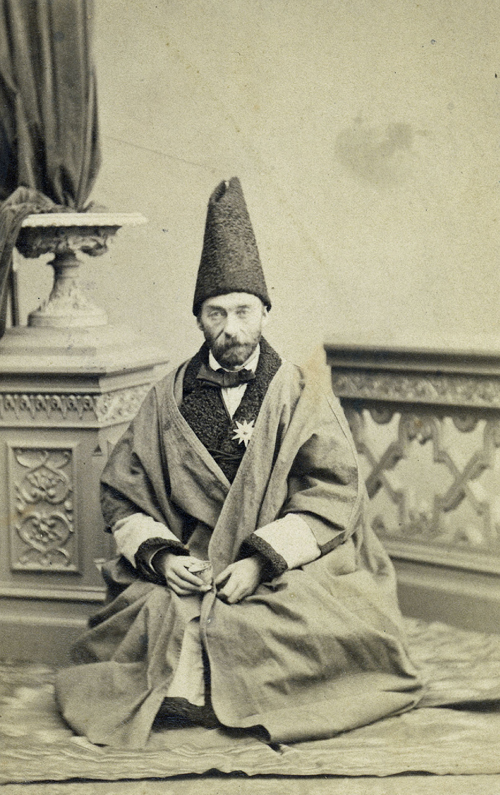
- Jakob Eduard Polak
- Born: 12 November 1818; Groß-Morzin/Mořina, Bohemia
- Died: 8 October 1891 (aged 72); Vienna
- Occupation: Austrian physician

Jakob Eduard Polak (12 November 1818 – 8 October 1891) was an Austrian physician, born to a Jewish family from Bohemia, who played an important role in introducing modern medicine in Iran.

== Life ==
Polak studied medicine in Prague and Vienna. He was one of the six Austrian teachers invited by Amir Kabir, the chief minister of Iran, as the instructors of Dar al-Fonun, the first modern higher education institution in Iran. By his own account, he entered Iran on 24 November 1851, before the inauguration of the Dar ul-Fonun.

From 1851 to 1860, he taught medicine at Dar ul-Fonun. In the beginning, he taught in French and used a translator. Soon, the incompetence of the translators motivated him to learn Persian. He learned Persian in six months, and then taught his course in Persian.

In 1885, he funded Otto Stapf, a Viennese botanist, to undertake a botanical expedition to South- and Western Iran. This led to the discovery of numerous new species of plants.

From 1855 to 1860, he served as personal physician of Naser al-Din Shah Qajar. In this capacity he was succeeded by French physician Joseph Désiré Tholozan.

== Works ==
Polak published his Persian experiences in: "Persien, das Land und seine Bewohner; Ethnograpische Schilderungen" (Leipzig, Brockhaus, 1865), which belongs to the outstanding ethnographic works about 19th-century Iran.

His other works include:

- Bimari i vaba (Tehran: Nast’aliq, 1269 [AH]).
- “La médicine militaire en Perse. Par le docteur J. E. Polak, ancien médecin particulier du schah de Perse,” Revue scientifique et administrative des médecins des armées de terre et de mer 7, 1865
- Topographische Bemerkungen zur Karte der Umgebung und zu dem Plane von Teheran. Mittheilungen der K.K. Geographischen Gesellschaft 20. Wien, L. C. Zamarski, k.k. Hof- Buchdruckereir und Hof-Lithographie 1877.
- Beitrag zu den agrarischen Verhältnissen in Persien. Mittheilungen der K.K. Geographischen Gesellschaft 6, 1863, 107–143.
- "Farben der persischen Teppiche". In: Katalog der Ausstellung orientalischer Teppiche im K.K. Österreichischen Handelsmuseum, Vienna, 1891, 44–49.

== See also ==
- Dar ul-Funun

== Bibliography ==
- Afsaneh GÄCHTER: Briefe aus Persien. Jacob E. Polaks medizinische Berichte. With an English Summary and Translation of Polak's „Letters from Persia“. New Academic Press, Vienna 2013, ISBN 978-3-7003-1867-5.
- Christoph WERNER: Polak, Jakob Eduard In: Encyclopædia Iranica. 2009
- Obituary: [[Richard von Drasche-Wartinberg]]: Dr. J. E. Polak. In: Neue Freie Presse, 14 October 1891, p. 22 (Online at ANNO).
- Mofakham, Yashar Samimi; Rafiee, Tarlan; Assmann, Peter (2020). Solace of Lovers: Trost Der Liebenden. Innsbruck, Austria: Haymon Verlag, Tiroler Landesmuseen Betriebsgesellschaft m.b.H. ISBN 978-3-7099-8119-1.
