= Parviz Tanavoli =

Iranian artist and historian (born 1937)

- پرویز تناولی
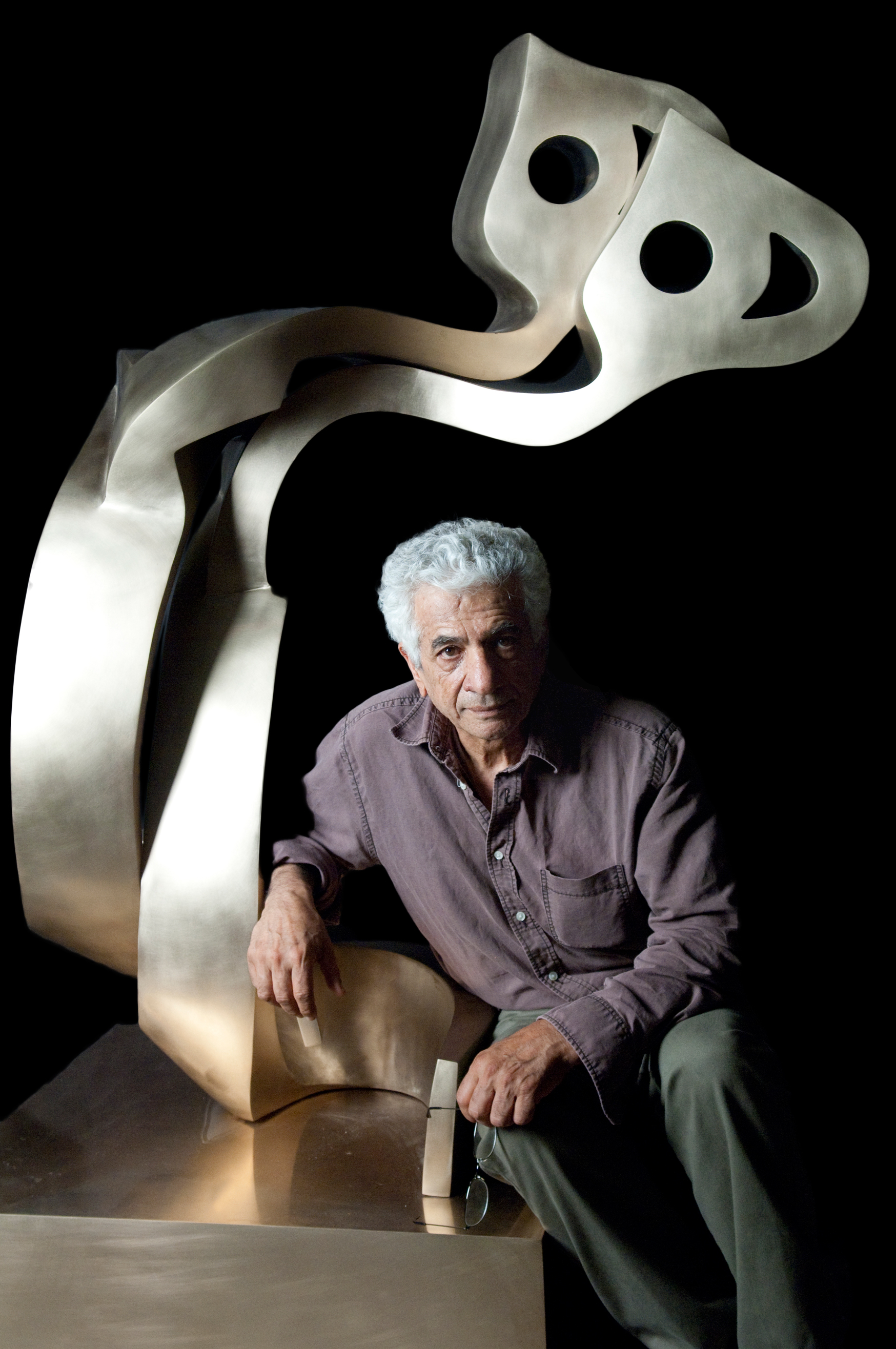
- Born: Parviz Tanavoli; 24 March 1937 (age 89); Tehran, Imperial State of Iran
- Education: Tehran School of Fine Arts; Academy of Fine Arts in Carrara, Brera Academy
- Occupations: Artist, Art Historian, Educator, Scholar
- Known for: Sculpture, painting, authorship
- Works: The Wall (Oh Persepolis); Heech
- Movement: Saqqakhaneh School of Art; Hurufiyya movement
- Website: www.tanavoli.com

Parviz Tanavoli (Persian: پرویز تناولی; born 1937) is an Iranian sculptor, painter, educator, and art historian. He is a pioneer within the Saqqakhaneh movement, a neo-traditionalist art movement. Tanavoli has been one of the most expensive Iranian artists in sales. Tanavoli series of sculpture work Heech are displayed in the British Museum, the Metropolitan Museum of Art, at Hamline University, in the Aga Khan Museum, and as public art in Vancouver. Tanavoli has also written extensively on this history of Persian art and craftsmanship. Since 1989, Tanavoli has held dual citizenship in Iran and Canada, and has lived and worked in both Tehran, Iran and Horseshoe Bay, West Vancouver, British Columbia.

== Early life and education ==
Parviz Tanavoli was born on 24 March 1937 in Tehran. In 1952, he started his education at the Tehran School of Fine Arts (now part of the University of Tehran). He continued his studies in Italy at the Academy of Fine Arts in Carrara (Italian: Accademia di Belle Arti di Carrara) in 1956 to 1957; as well as at Brera Academy (Italian: Accademia di Belle Arti di Brera) in Milan from 1958 to 1959 . He studied under sculptor Mariano Marini.

Upon graduating from the Brera Academy in 1959, he returned to Iran in 1960 and taught sculpting at the College of Decorative Arts in Tehran.

== Career ==
=== Teaching ===
Upon his return to Iran, he started teaching at the Tehran College of Decorative Arts, where he was also a founding member. Many pioneers of Iranian modern art, such as Zenderoudi, studied under him at this college. From February 1961 to 1964, Tanavoli taught sculpture for three years at the Minneapolis College of Art and Design, as a guest of art collector Abby Grey. He then returned to Iran and assumed the directorship of the sculpture department at the Tehran University (now University of Tehran), a position he held for 18 years until 1979 when he retired from his teaching duties.

In addition to his tenure as a sculpture professor at the Minneapolis College of Art and Design from 1961 to 1964 and his 18-year directorship of the sculpture department at Tehran University, Tanavoli has continued to teach and mentor young artists. Tanavoli's newest "heeches" exhibition, titled "All and Nothing," was held at Tehran's Art Space Gallery from 6 July to 3 August 2022. The exhibition showcased the works of 40 of his students and his own newest "heeches," which are among his most recognized works.

Iranian sculptor Ahad Hosseini briefly worked in Tanavoli's atelier.

=== Artwork ===
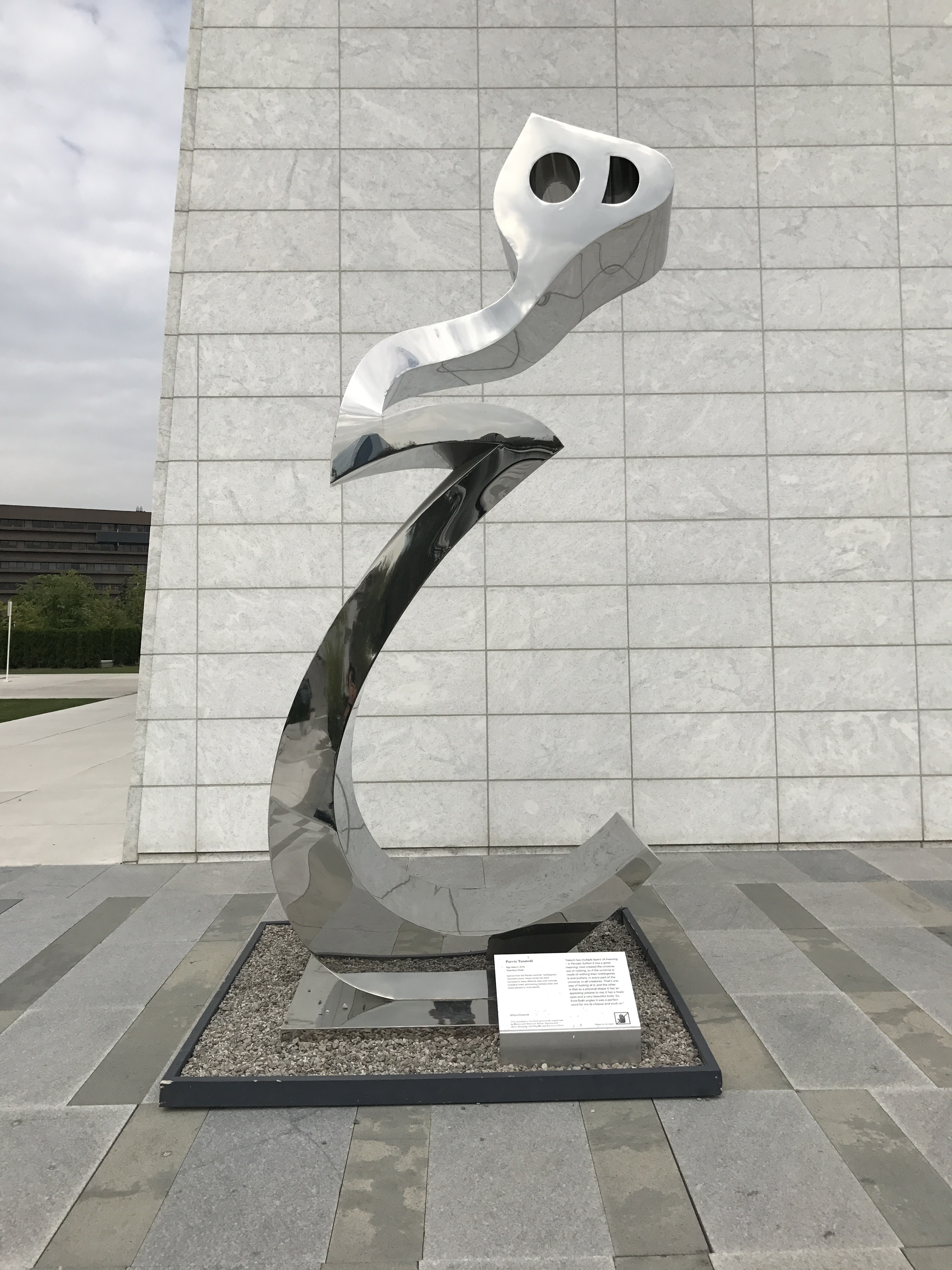
Parviz Tanavoli, Heech, Stainless steel, Agha Khan Museum, Toronto (Canada)

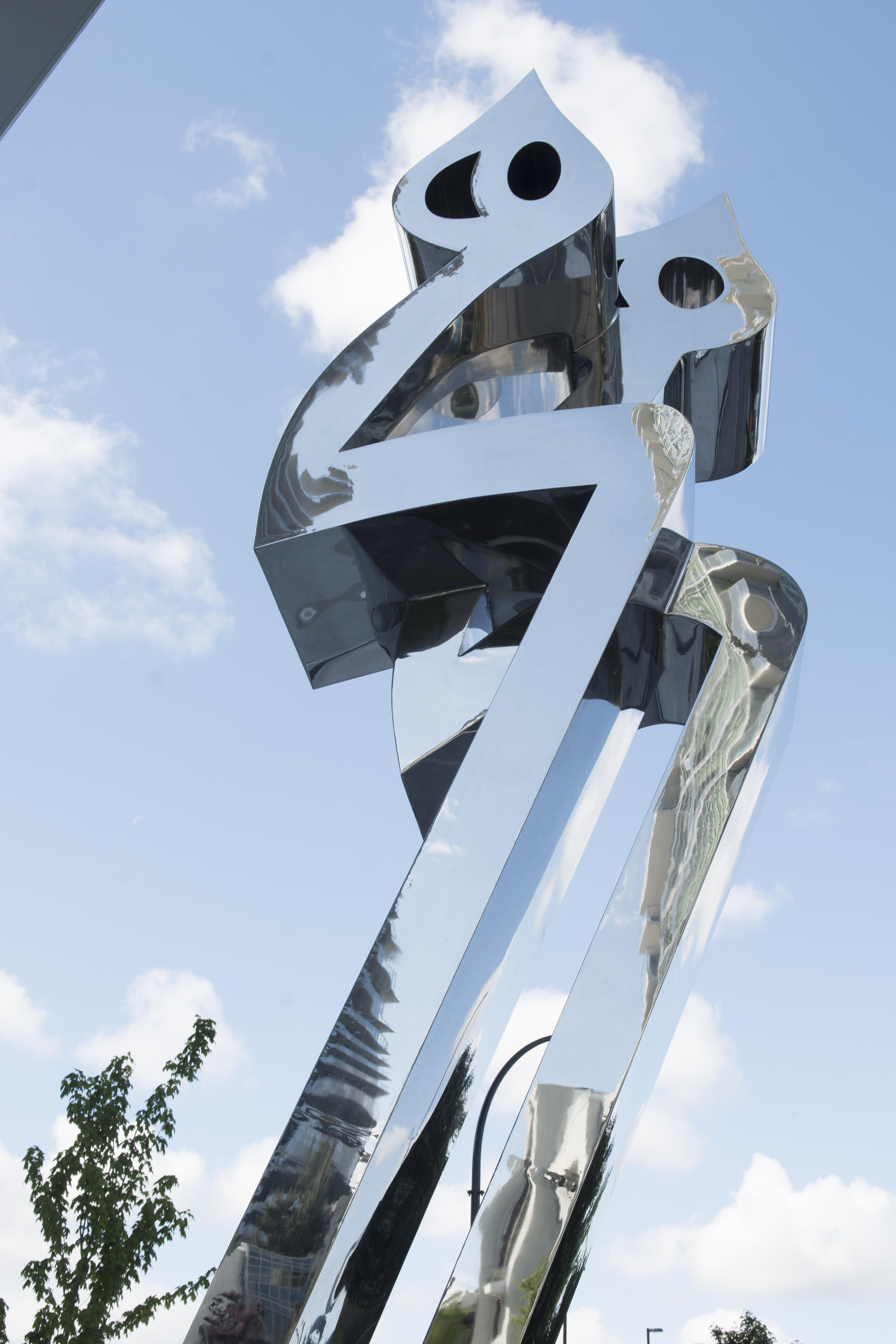
Parviz Tanavoli, Heech Lovers, 5.5 Meters in Stainless steel, Vancouver (Canada)

He is the main figure and the key member of the Saqqakhaneh group of artists who share a common popular aesthetic, according to the scholar Karim Emami. He has been influenced heavily by his country's history and culture, and traditions and has always been fascinated with locksmithing. Tanavoli was once a cultural advisor to the Shahbanu Farah Pahlavi. Tanavoli is known for his heeches, three-dimensional representations of the Persian word for 'nothing', heech. Composed of three Persian characters in the style of nasta'liq, the three letters he, ye and če are combined to produce the word heech.\

In 2003, Tanavoli turned his Tehran house into the "Museum of Parviz Tanavoli," showcasing his personal art collection, which was only open for a few months due to political issues in Iran.

One example of this series is the 2007 bronze sculpture Poet Turning Into Heech, held by the Metropolitan Museum of Art. Its composition combines the calligraphic form of heech with the figure of a poet. The museum relates Tanavoli's treatment of the word to the poetry of Rumi and to the Sufi idea that creation emerges from nothingness; across the series, the word may sit on a chair, appear inside a cage, or envelop a human figure.

=== Rasht 29 Club ===
In 1967, Tanavoli, Kamran Diba, and Roxana Saba (daughter of Abolhasan Saba) founded the Rasht 29 Club on a northern street near the Amirkabir University of Technology (formerly the Tehran Polytechnic). Rasht 29 Club was named after the street address, and it was a popular hangout amongst artists of the time including Marcos Grigorian, Hossein Zenderoudi, Sadegh Tabrizi, Faramarz Pilaram, Sohrab Sepehri, Massoud Arabshahi, Yadollah Royai, Nader Naderpour, Reza Baraheni, Esmail Shahroudi, Ahmadreza Ahmadi, Bijan Elahi, Ebrahim Golestan, Hageer Daruish, Kamran Shirdel, Sadeq Chubak, Karl Schlamminger, and others.

=== Sales ===
Tanavoli's work has been auctioned worldwide, leading to over $9 million in overall sales, making him the most expensive living Iranian artist. In 2008, his work, The Wall (Oh Persepolis), an almost 2-meter tall bronze sculpture covered in incomprehensible hieroglyphs fetched USD 2.84 million at a Dubai Christie's sale, which was an auction record for an artist of Middle Eastern origins.

== Exhibitions ==
The most recent solo exhibition of Parviz Tanavoli, "Parviz Tanavoli: Poets, Locks, Cages", took place from 1 July 2023, to 19 November 2023, showcasing a comprehensive range of his works spanning six decades. This exhibition, held at Vancouver Art Gallery, provided a thorough retrospective of his career.

Prior to this, his solo exhibition was in 2019 at the West Vancouver Art Museum entitled "Oh Nightingale". Before that, he had another solo exhibition in 2017 at the Tehran Museum of Contemporary Art based on his Lions works and Lion collection.

In 2015, after four decades, Davis Museum at Wellesley College organized the first solo exhibition of Tanavoli's work in the US.

In 2003, he had a major retrospective at the Tehran Museum of Contemporary Art. Prior to that he had held solo exhibitions in Austria, Italy, Germany, United States and Britain. Tanavoli has been in group exhibitions internationally.

His work has been displayed at the Tate Modern, British Museum, Metropolitan Museum of Art, the Grey Art Gallery - New York University, the Isfahan City Center, Nelson Rockefeller Collection, New York, Olympic Park, Seoul, South Korea, the Royal Museum of Jordan, the Museum of Modern Art, Vienna, Museum of Modern Art, New York, Walker Art Center, Minneapolis, Hamline University, St. Paul and Shiraz University, Iran.

== Politics and art ==
In 2005, he created a small piece of sculpture called Heech in a Cage to protest the conditions of the American-held prisoners at Guantanamo Bay detainment camp and in 2006, began work on his piece to honor the victims of the Israeli-Lebanon war.

A day before Tanavoli was due to speak at the British Museum in 2016, authorities in Iran confiscated his passport, preventing him from leaving the country, accusing him of "disturbing the public peace". Tanavoli explained that "I have not done anything wrong. I spent the whole day at the passport office, but no one told me anything, nor did anyone at the airport. I'm not a political person, I'm merely an artist."

== Honours and legacy ==
In 2015, the biographical documentary film, Parviz Tanavoli: Poetry in Bronze, was released. It was directed by Terrence Turner and produced by Timothy Turner and Tandis Tanavoli.

In October 2020, the former Mina Street in the Niavaran neighbourhood was renamed Parviz Tanavoli by the municipality of Tehran.

== Bibliography ==
=== Authored or co-authored by Tanavoli ===
Tanavoli has authored over forty publications dating back over four decades. Among these are:

- Tanavoli, Parviz; Wertime, John T. (1976). Locks from Iran; Pre-Islamic to Twentieth Century. Washington, D.C.: Smithsonian Institution Traveling Exhibition Service.
- Tanavoli, Parviz (1985). Lion Rugs: The Lion in the Art and Culture of Iran. Universität Zürich. Völkerkundemuseum, Musée des arts décoratifs de la ville de Lausanne. Basel: Transbooks. ISBN 9783859770782.
- Tanavoli, Parviz (1985). Shahsavan Iranian Rugs and Textiles. New York City, NY: Rizzoli. ISBN 9780847806263.
- Tanavoli, Parviz (1990). Gabbeh. Baar, Switzerland.
- Tanavoli, Parviz (1994). Bread and Salt: Iranian Tribal Spreads and Salt Bags. Shirin Samii (translator). Ketab Sara Company.
- Tanavoli, Parviz (1994). Kings, Heroes and Lovers: Pictorial Rugs from the Tribes and Villages of Iran. London, UK: Scorpion Pub. ISBN 9780905906867.
- Tanavoli, Parviz (1998). Sofreh of Kamo. Tehran, Iran: Yassavoli. ISBN 9789643060640.
- Tanavoli, Parwīz (1998). Horse and Camel Trappings from Tribal Iran: Riding in Splendour. Intišārāt-i Yasāwulī.
- Tanavoli, Parviz (1998). Tacheh of Chahar Mahal. Yassavoli. ISBN 9789643060688.
- Tanavoli, Parviz (2001). دستبافتهاى روستايى و عشايرى ورامين [Rustic and Tribal Weaves from Varamin] (in Persian). Yassavoli. ISBN 9789643062118.
- Tanavoli, Parviz (2002). Persian Flatweaves: A Survey of Flatwoven Floor Covers and Hangings and Royal Masnads. London, UK: Antique Collectors' Club. ISBN 9781851493357.
- Tanavoli, Parviz (2004). Gabbeh: Art Underfoot. Tehran, Iran: Yassavoli Publications. ISBN 9789643062972.
- Tanavoli, Parviz (2005). Atelier Kaboud. Tehran, Iran: Bon-Gah. ISBN 9789649638300.
- Tanavoli, Parviz; Sherrill, Sarah B. (2006). Sormehdan: Kohl Containers of Iran from Prehistory to the 19th Century. C. Ferguson (translation). Bon-Gah. ISBN 9789649638331.
- Tanavoli, Parviz (2006). Talisman.
- Tanavoli, Parviz (2007). Scales and Weights.
- Tanavoli, Parviz (2008). Jewelry by Parviz Tanavoli.
- Tanavoli, Parviz (2009). Tomb Stone. Tehran: Bongah.
- Tanavoli, Parviz (2010). Ceramics. Tehran: Bongah.
- Tanavoli, Parviz (2010). Afshar; Tribal Weaves from Southern Iran. Tehran: Iranian Academy of Arts.
- Tanavoli, Parviz (2011). Rugs. Tehran: Bongah.
- Tanavoli, Parviz (2012). Undiscovered Minimalism: Gelims from Northern Iran. London, UK: Laurence King Publishing. ISBN 9781898113768.
- Tanavoli, Parviz (2012). Wonders of Universe. Tehran: Bongah.
- Tanavoli, Parviz (2014). Poet (in Persian). Tehran, Iran: Bon-Gah.
- Tanavoli, Parviz (2015). An Introduction To The History Of Graphic Design In Iran. Tehran, Iran: Nazar Publishing.
- Tanavoli, Parviz (2015). Salt Bags: Iranian Tribal And Rural Weavings. Tehran, Iran: Nazar Publishing. ISBN 9786001521867.
- Tanavoli, Parviz (2016). European Women in Persian Houses: Western Images in Safavid and Qajar Iran. Bloomsbury Academic. ISBN 9781784535070.
- Tanavoli, Parviz (2017). Sherrill, Sarah B. (ed.). Khorjins: Tribal And Rural Weaves From Iran (in Persian). Vol. 2. Tehran, Iran: Nazar Publishing. ISBN 9786001522239.
- Khosrowshahi, Maryam; Floor, Willem M.; Tanavoli, Parviz (2017). Sofreh: The Art of Persian Celebration. Vol. 1. ACC Art Books. ISBN 9781851498581.
- Tanavoli, Parviz (2017). Sherrill, Sarah B. (ed.). Khorjins: Tribal And Rural Weaves From Iran (in Persian). Vol. 2. Tehran, Iran: Nazar Publishing. ISBN 9786001522239.

=== On Tanavoli ===
Films, books, catalogs and magazines on Parviz Tanavoli

- Film: The biographical documentary film, “Parviz Tanavoli: Poetry in Bronze” was released in 2015
- Parviz Tanavoli's : Monograph is considered the first exquisite "Catalog raisonné " of an artist in the Middle East. Notes by Parviz Tanavoli, Sia Aramjani, Shiva Balaghi, Kamran Diba, Gisela Fook, Maryam Saudi, Alireza Sami Azar and Tandis Tanavoli have been published in this book.

This book, in English and Arabic, was published once and for all in a limited edition of 1000 volumes, each with a unique number, in 2010 with the support of the Sheikh of Abu Dhabi, Khalifa Bin Zayed Al Nahyan, and was purchased by famous collectors and libraries.

- Tanavoli, Parviz; Rafiee, Tarlan; Samimi Mofakham, Yashar; Assmann, Peter (2020). Solace of Lovers. Trost Der Liebenden. Innsbruck, Austria: Tiroler Landesmuseen Betriebsgesellschaft m.b.H. ISBN 978-3-7099-8119-1.
- Porter, Venetia; Hatam, Behzad, eds. (2017). Parviz Tanavoli and the Lions of Iran. Tehran, Iran: Nazar Publishing. ISBN 9786001522413.
- Tanavoli, Parviz; Fischman, Lisa; Balaghi, Shiva; Amirsadeghi, Hossein; Eisler, Maryam Homayoun (2015). Parviz Tanavoli. Davis Museum and Cultural Center. Davis Museum, Wellesley College. ISBN 9780985824938.
- Ghomshei, Morteza; Royaee, Sina; Balaghi, Shiva (2011). Sherrill, Sarah B. (ed.). Heech: Works of Parviz Tanavoli. Tehran, Iran: Bon-Gah Publications. ISBN 9786005268102.
- Tanavoli, Parviz (2011). Parviz Tanavoli: Poet in Love: 1970s-2011 works from the artist's collection. London: Austin/Desmond Fine Art. ISBN 978-1-872926-35-3.
- Tanavoli, Parviz; Pocock, Charles; Faruqi, Samar (2010). Parviz Tanavoli: Monograph. Dubai, United Arab Emirates: Publications Department of Meem with Art Advisory Associates Ltd. ISBN 978-1-907051-03-6.
- Allan, James W.; Gilmour, Brian J. J. (2000). Persian Steel: The Tanavoli Collection. Oxford Studies in Islamic art. Vol. 15. Oxford University Press for the Board of the Faculty of Oriental Studies, University of Oxford and the British Institute of Persian Studies. ISBN 9780197280256.
- Galloway, David D., ed. (2000). Parviz Tanavoli: Sculptor, Writer & Collector. James W. Allan. Iranian Art Publishing. ISBN 9789649140346.
- Tanavoli, Parviz; Universität Zürich; Völkerkundemuseum; Musée des arts décoratifs de la ville de Lausanne (1985). Lion rugs: the lion in the art and culture of Iran. Basel: publisher not identified]; Distributed in the USA by Transbooks. ISBN 978-3-85977-078-2.
- Tanavoli, Parviz (1976). Parviz Tanavoli: Fifteen Years of Bronze Sculpture (art exhibition). Grey Art Gallery and Study Center. New York: Grey Art Gallery and Study Center, New York University.

== See also ==
- Iranian handicrafts
- Iranian modern and contemporary art
