= Albert Joseph Gasteiger =

Austrian nobleman and engineer (1823–1890)

Albert Joseph Gasteiger Freiherr von Ravenstein und Kobach
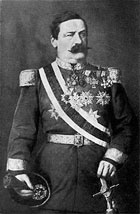
- 1878 photograph of Gasteiger
- Born: 28 March 1823; Innsbruck, Habsburg Empire
- Died: 5 July 1890 (aged 67); Bozen, Austria-Hungary
- Employer: Naser al-Din Shah Qajar
- Title: Mirpanj (lit. Major General in Persian; Persian: میرپنج); Khaan (Persian: خان)
- Honours: Mohandes Bashi (lit. Head of Engineers, Persian: مهندس‌باشی)

Albert Joseph Gasteiger (known in Persian as Gāstager Khan; 28 March 1823–5 July 1890), was an Austrian nobleman and engineering officer. Born in Innsbruck, he became an instructor at the Dar ol-Fonun in Qajar Iran, as well as the manager of all civilian and military buildings at the behest of Iran's government from 1860 to 1888. He died in Bozen (present-day Bolzano, Italy).

Gasteiger was the baron of Ravenstein and Kobach. He became famous in Iran for his road constructions, and As a reward to his services to Iran, Naser al-Din Shah appointed him as Mīrpanj (Persian: میرپنج, lit. Major general) and conferred upon him the title Khan (lord). He was the first European to be bestowed with the title of Khan (Persian: خان; lit. Lord).

Gasteiger gathered a comprehensive collection of Qajar art during his stay in Iran, and donated the collection to the city of Innsbruck on his return to Austria. This collection is now part of the permanent collection of the Tyrolean State Museum.

in 2020, the exhibition "SOLACE OF LOVERS: TROST DER LIEBENDEN" was curated by Tarlan Rafiee and Yashar Samimi Mofakham for the Tyrolean State Museum. In this exhibitions for the first time, the historical collection of Albert Joseph Gasteiger of Qajar art was put of display. Alongside his collection, works by Iranian modern masters. A book under the same title was published under the authorship of the curators, discussing the life and collection of Gateiger Khan.
