= Bijan Mofid =

Iranian artist

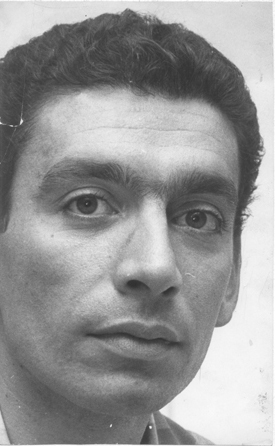
- Born: Bijan Mofid; 31 May 1935; Tehran, Imperial State of Iran
- Died: 12 November 1984 (aged 49); Los Angeles, United States
- Education: University of Tehran
- Occupations: Director, screenwriter, playwright, poet, songwriter
- Years active: 1954–1984
- Spouses: Farideh Farjam (divorced) Jamileh Nedayi (divorced) Azam Kowsari (Gorgin) (death)
- Children: 4
- Relatives: Bahman Mofid (brother); Hengameh Mofid (sister)

Bijan Mofid (Persian: بیژن مفید; May 31, 1935 – November 12, 1984) was an influential Iranian playwright and stage director. His most famous work, Shahr-e Ghesseh, is an allegorical satire written in the form of a musical play using elements of Iranian folklore, for which he also composed the music. Bijan Mofid (playwright/director) was one of very few serious modern Iranian artists whose writing has reached beyond the intelligentsia to a broad general audience.

== Life ==
He was born in Tehran in 1935. After teaching for several years at the University of Tehran, he founded a theater workshop, where many of Iran's finest actors received their training. The workshop's major production was Bijan's own City Of Tales (Shahr-e-Ghesseh), a profound satire that weaves social comment through adaptations of traditional music and folk tales. It toured for 3 years, was made into an award-winning film and is recognized as a classic of Iranian literature.

Bijan's work as playwright and director has had a continuous and controversial presence in Iranian theater, both on the popular stage and in experimental productions. Nine of his plays have been produced and published and their songs recorded. He directed over fifty productions for radio and television in addition to his stage work; his rare appearances as an actor included the lead role in Arbie Ovanesian's acclaimed production of Suddenly... at the 1992 [?] Nancy International Theatre Festival.

The wide popular audiences drawn by Mofid's work earned him an unprecedented degree of immunity from censorship. But his relationship with the Shah's regime consisted of a balancing act between continuous harassment from the secret police and the embarrassment of official recognition and reinterpretation of his work

During and after the Iranian Revolution, political groups across the entire spectrum attempted to claim his work as representative of their ideals, but he remained independent and withdrew his plays from production when their integrity was threatened. As the resistance to the Islamic regime grew, recordings of songs from his plays were played on the rooftops of Tehran, identifying Mofid with the opposition. As a result, he lived underground for several months and eventually escaped to the United States. From 1982 until his untimely death in 1984, Bijan directed several productions in Los Angeles, San Francisco and New York as well as the first production of his own work in translation, Dragonfly. He took these opportunities to rewrite some of his work that had suffered most heavily from censorship in Iran.

== Quotes ==
- "I became a writer because I found life unsatisfactory."
