= Armoury, Innsbruck =

Coordinates: 47°16′14.7″N 11°24′27″E

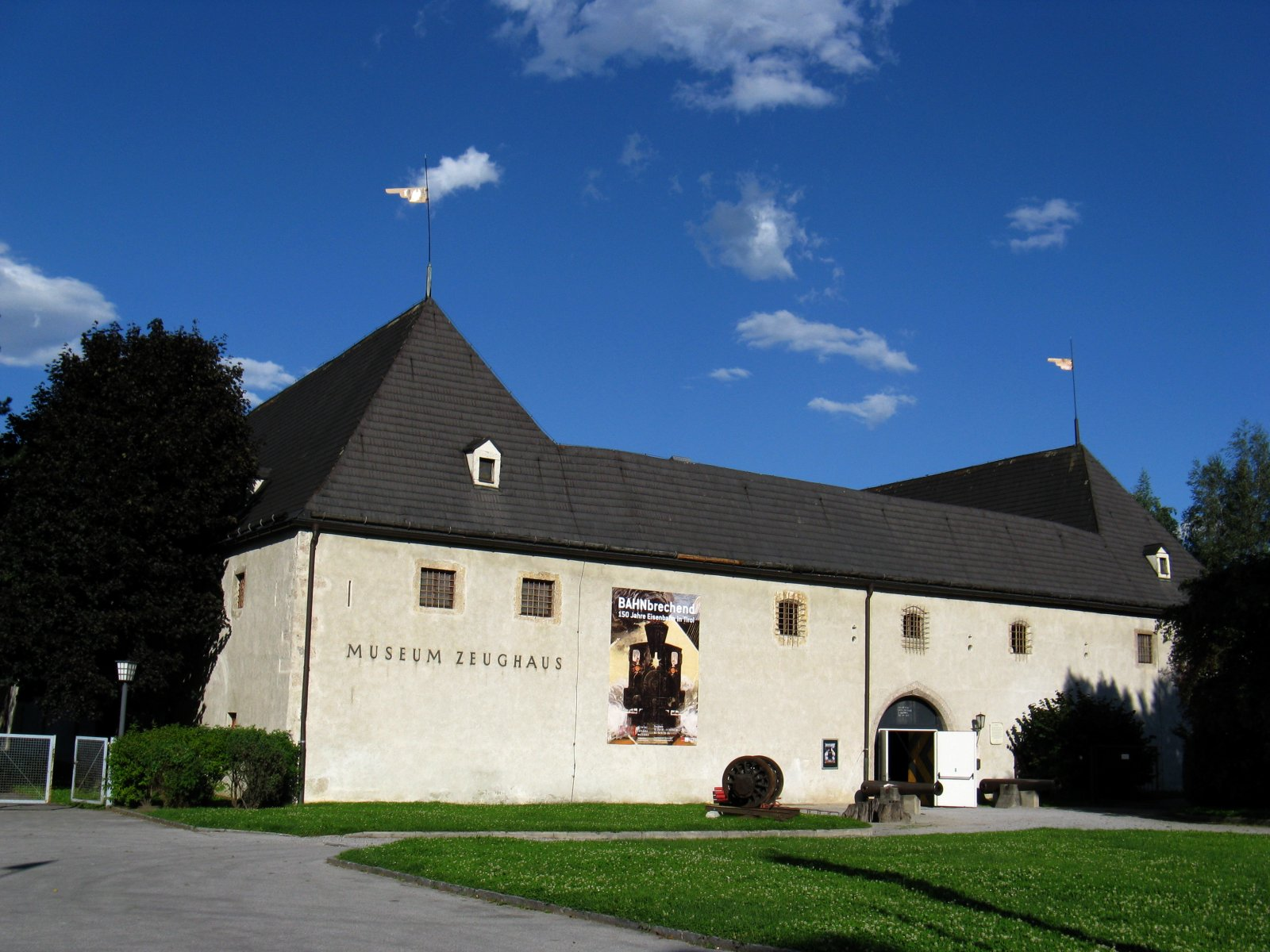
The Armoury

The Armoury (German: Zeughaus) in Innsbruck, Austria, is a former military arsenal that is now a museum. It lies in the Innsbruck quarter of Dreiheiligen.

== History ==
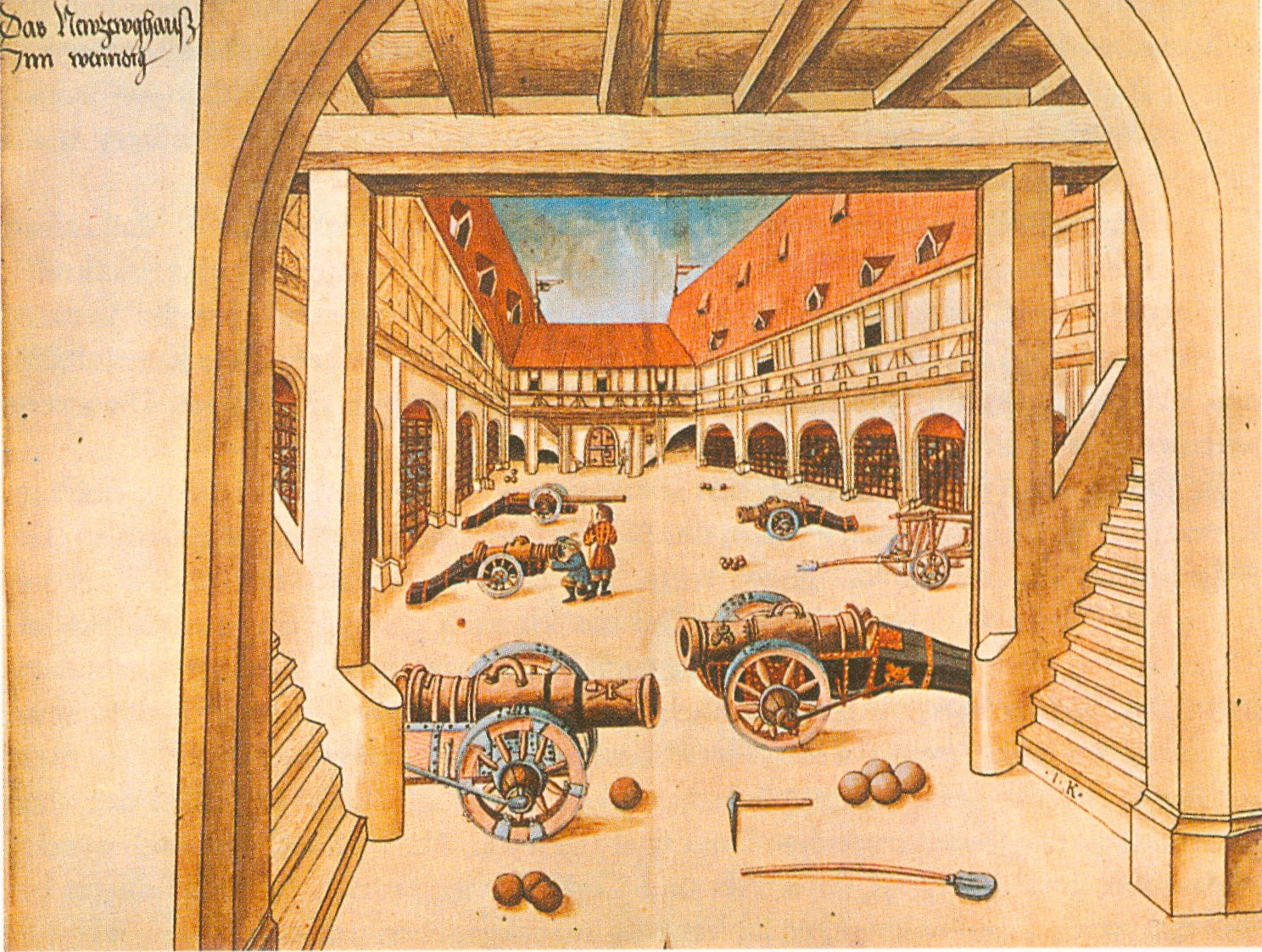
The Armoury around 1507

Maximilian I had the Armoury built from 1500 to 1505 on the Sill which was then in front of the gates of the town. It consists of two 80 x 10 m, two-storey wings and two narrow gatehouses and blocks that surround a large inner courtyard. Materiel for war was stored here and, around the Armoury, were subsidiary buildings. As well as cannon, many small arms were also stored here.

In 1503 a brass foundry was built in Mühlau. Crucial to the choice of location was the site of the city of Innsbruck as a transport hub and the thriving copper mines of Tyrol, which had given rise to a flourishing arms industry in Innsbruck.

In 1503 housed the armory about 150 guns

Until the end of the monarchy in 1918 the place was still in use as the Armoury Barracks (Zeughauskaserne). It was restored in 1964/1969 and opened in 1973 as the Tyrolean State History Museum (Tiroler Landeskundliches Museum).

== Museum ==
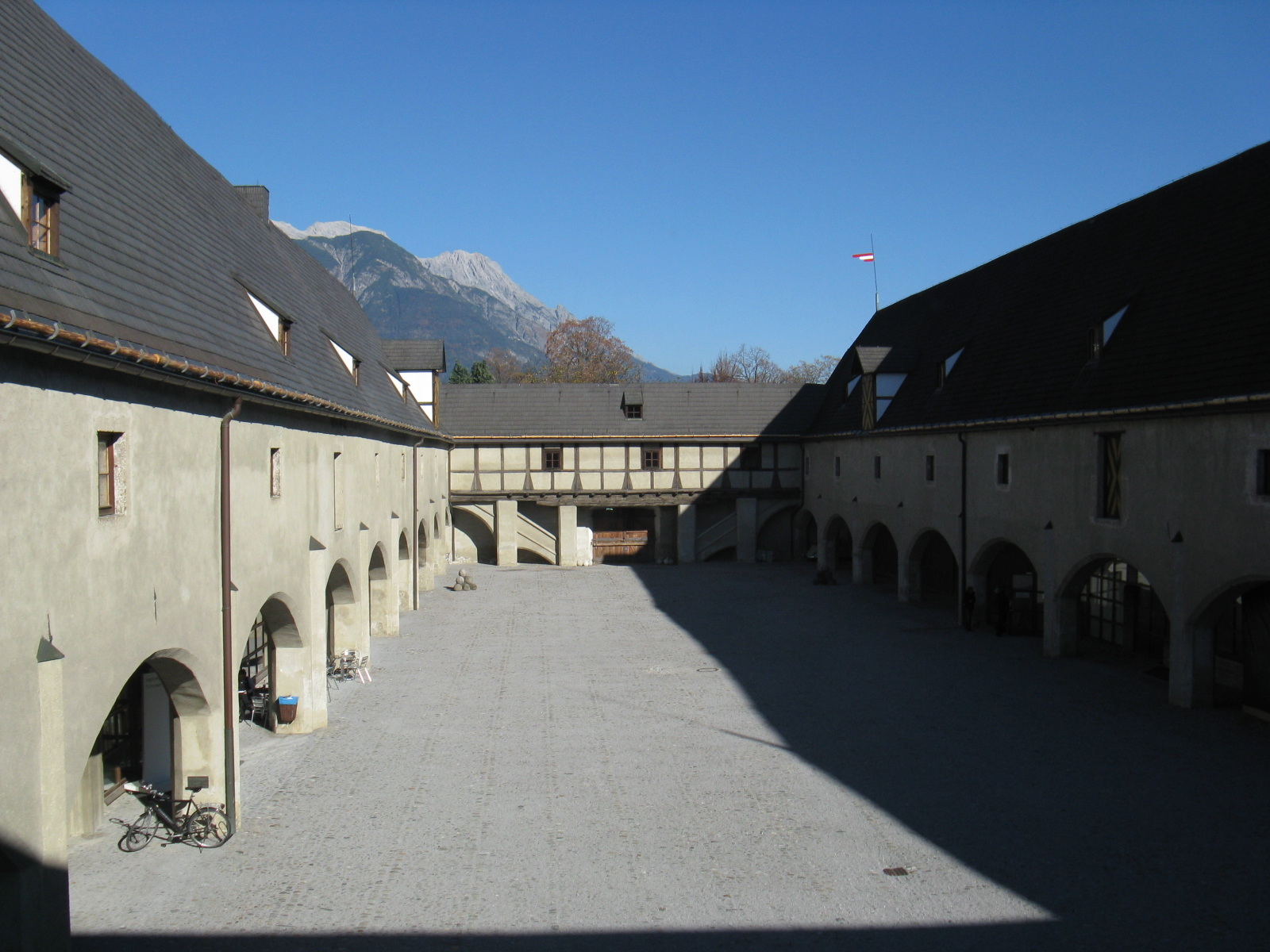
The inner court

Today a branch of the Tyrolean State Museum is housed in the Armoury. It offers a historical and technical collection of the cultural history of Tyrol from the early period to its most recent history.

The museum puts on special exhibitions that change periodically. In summer the inner courtyard hosts open-air cinemas and concerts.

== Sources ==
- Hartwig Neumann: Das Zeughaus. Die Entwicklung eines Bautyps von der spätmittelalterlichen Rüstkammer zum Arsenal im deutschsprachigen Bereich vom XV. bis XIX. Jahrhundert. 2 Bde. Koblenz 1990/91.
