= Tehran Contemporary Music Festival =

Music festival in Iran

Tehran Contemporary Music Festival - TCMF
- Genre: Classical, Contemporary classical.
- Dates: April–June
- Location: (Iran) Tehran
- Years active: 2016–present
- Founders: Navid Gohari - director Ehsan Tarokh - Executive director Idin Samimi Mofakham - Artistic co-director/curator Martyna Kosecka - Artistic co-director/curator
- Website: www.tehrancmf.com

Tehran Contemporary Music Festival (TCMF) is the premiere contemporary music festival in Iran.

The festival usually takes place during the time of one week in April–June period (depending on the calendar of Islamic feasts) and is staged at venues all around Tehran. The events are staged both in large, established venues such as Roudaki Hall and the Tehran Museum of Contemporary Art as well as in small Galleries, Cultural Places, industrial premises and Public Places.

== Background ==
The thoughts of creating a festival devoted to popularization of contemporary music in Iran started in 2014.

In the fall of 2015, the Academic and artistic council of the Festival was formed with the cooperation of Navid Gohari (artistic director), Ehsan Tarokh (executive director), Hamidreza Ardalan (research adviser), Idin Samimi Mofakham, Martyna Kosecka (artistic advisers). Announcing the call and inviting foreign groups with the collaboration of Spectro Centre for New Music, executive paces were made afterwards to organize the First International Festival of Tehran Contemporary Music.

== Program ==
The program of each festival edition varies depending on the presented content.

== Venues ==
=== Vahdat Hall ===
Vahdat Hall was opened in 1967.

Roudaki foundation building consisted of two halls ran under the names Roudaki Hall and Small Hall, after the Islamic Revolution of Iran, the larger hall was changed, to Vahdat Hall and the smaller hall Was changed to Roudaki Hall. After the Islamic Revolution these mostly host music concerts and theatrical performances.

=== Roudaki Hall ===
Roudaki Hall proved stage is fixed and is designed just for the orchestra rehearsal and performing music groups. The process of repair and equipment of Roudaki Hall started on January 6, 2011.

=== Tehran Museum of Contemporary Art ===
Tehran Museum of Contemporary Art, also known as TMOCA, is among the largest art museums in Iran.

== Festival Orchestra ==
“Nilper in ancient Iranian language means “Lotus” and it’s a symbol for peace and friendship in opinion of all countries.”

Nilper Orchestra was founded in 2004 for performing Contemporary Classical Music. The Orchestra's continuous aspiration is performing art music of both Iranian and international contemporary composers, while – as the members of the orchestra – bringing together talented performers and rising artists living and working in Iran. Since its establishment, the orchestra has performed regularly in seasonal programming, and in its 13th years of activity has performed 28 full concerts, performing 58 works in repertoire of contemporary music, 23 world or national premieres, and has hosted 10 soloists. Since 2008 Ehsan Tarokh has been responsible for orchestra's managerial activities. Nilper is focused on introducing and performing the rarity repertoire of high quality, observing international rules of Copyright and interaction with publishing houses, and invitation and hosting of established artists and soloists from around the world. These all mark the concept, philosophy, and the approach of the board of directors in Nilper Orchestra.

== See also ==
- Tehran Museum of Contemporary Art
