= Albin Egger-Lienz =

Austrian painter (1868–1926)

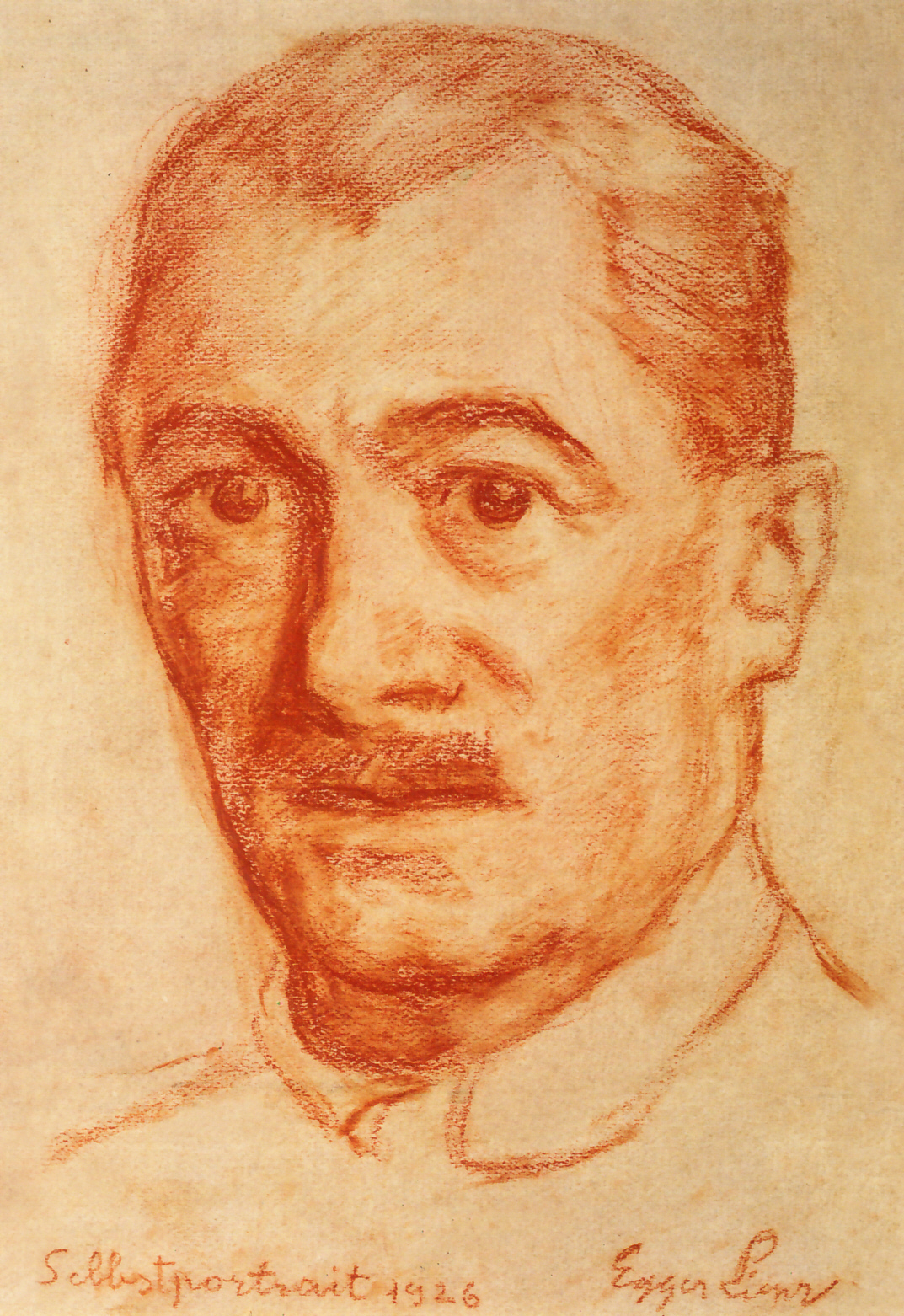
Selbstbildnis (self-portrait), 1926.

Albin Egger-Lienz (29 January 1868 – 4 November 1926) was an Austrian painter known especially for rustic genre and historical paintings.

== Career ==
He was born in Dölsach-Stribach near Lienz, in what was the county of Tyrol. He was the natural son of Maria Trojer, a peasant girl, and Georg Egger, a church painter. As an adult he used his father's surname combined with the name of his birthplace. He had his first artistic training under his father, and subsequently studied at the Academy in Munich where he was influenced by Franz Defregger and French painter Jean-François Millet.

From 1893 to 1899 he worked in Munich, where he joined the local artistic association. He exhibited from the mid-1890s. His early works depicted scenes of peasant life and historical scenes from the Tyrolean Rebellion of 1809, such as Ave Maria after the Battle on the Bergisel (1893–1896; Tyrolean State Museum, Innsbruck).

In 1899 he married Laura Möllwald (with whom he had children Lörli, Fred and Ila) and moved to Vienna where he worked separately from the local artistic environment. He tried in vain to get a job as a teacher at the Academy of Fine Arts in Vienna. In 1900 he participated in the Universal Exhibition in Paris and received the bronze medal for the painting Feldsegen.

During the first decade of the 20th century he often frequented and worked in the Tyrol, particularly in the Ötz Valley. In 1909 he joined the Vienna Secession. Under the influence of Ferdinand Hodler, Egger-Lienz developed a formal language of monumental expressiveness, showing a preference for heroic figures enclosed in stage-like spaces. Strongly outlined, massive forms were painted using a nearly monochromatic palette of earth colors.

In 1910, his request for a professorship at the Vienna Academy was again rejected, due to the opposition of the heir to the throne, Archduke Franz Ferdinand.

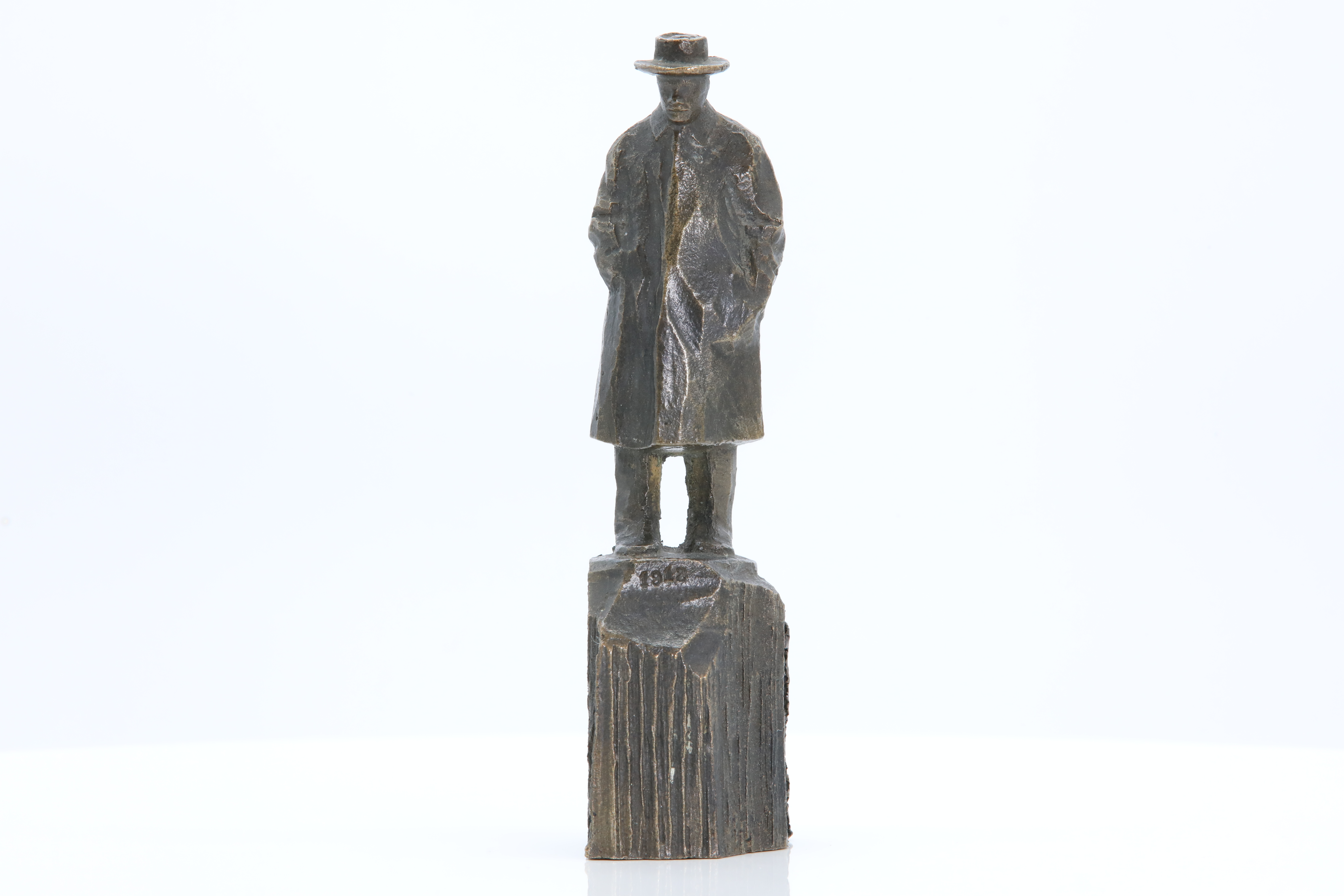
Small bronze sculpture of Albin Egger-Lienz by Ottmar Zeiller (1912)

In 1911 he moved from Vienna to Hall near Innsbruck. During 1911 and 1912 he was professor at the Weimar Saxon-Grand Ducal Art School in Weimar. He visited the Netherlands, where he studied the old masters. Egger-Lienz publicly distanced himself from the work of Hodler by means of an article titled "Monumentale Kunst", written by art critic Otto Kunz and published in 1912 under Egger-Lienz's name.

In September 1913 he moved with his family to Santa Giustina, near Bolzano.

He was called up for military service in 1915, but was soon exonerated from front service. He was a war painter in plainclothes on the southern Austrian front in 1916. After the end of the war he remained in South Tyrol. In 1919 he turned down a professorship in Vienna.

He resumed painting peasant scenes, but with religious content, as in Christ’s Resurrection (1924; Tyrolean State Museum, Innsbruck). He had critical success with the works painted in Italy, exhibited in Rome and Venice and in Vienna, in 1925, at the Wiener Künstlerhaus. He received a renewed proposal to teach at the Academy of Applied Arts in Vienna, but again declined.

In his last years he painted a series of paintings and frescoes for the Memorial Chapel of the Fallen in War in Lienz.

Egger-Lienz died of pneumonia on 4 November 1926 in St. Justina-Rentsch, Bozen/Bolzano, South Tirol/ Alto Adige, Italy.

== Gallery ==
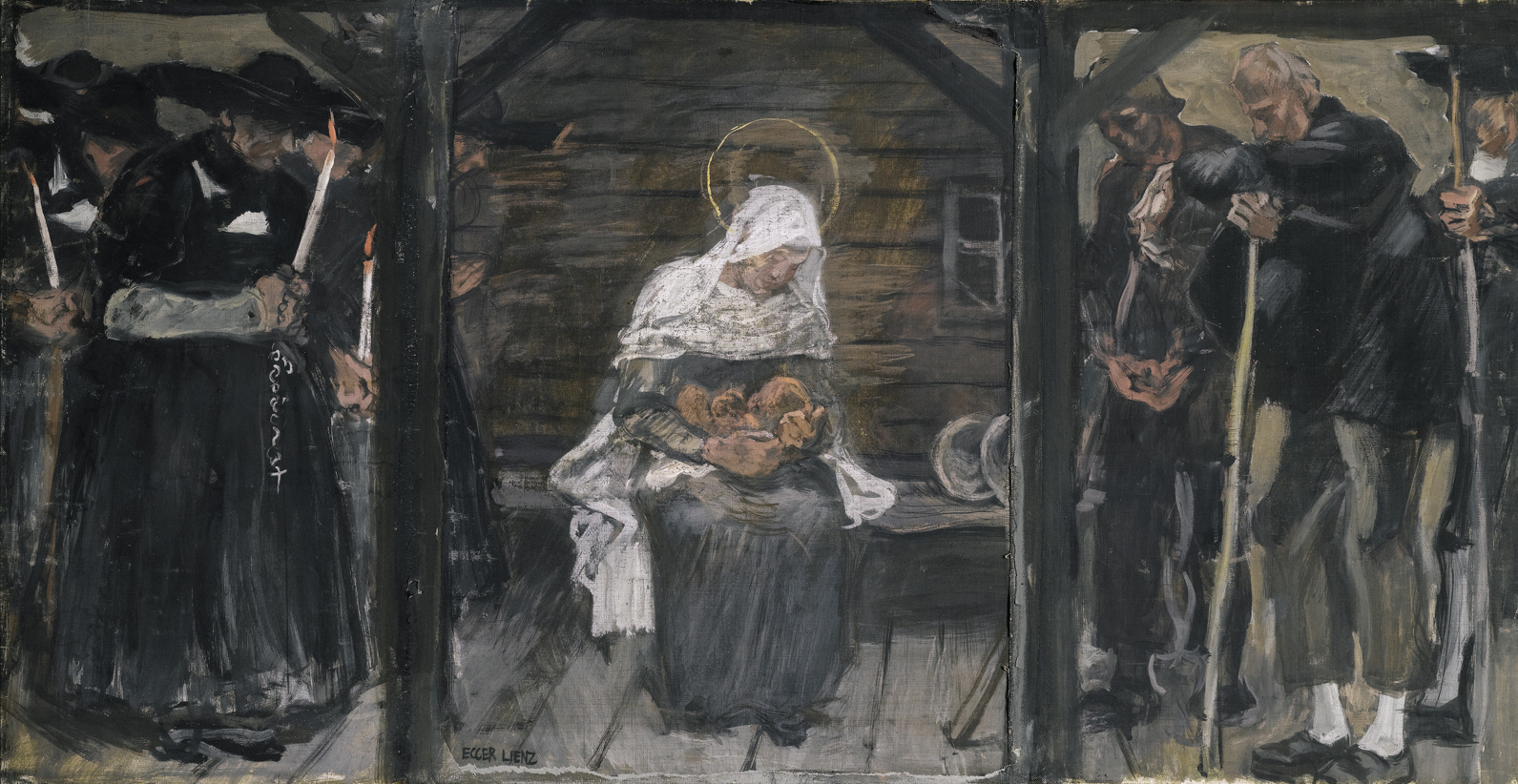
"The Adoration" (1904)

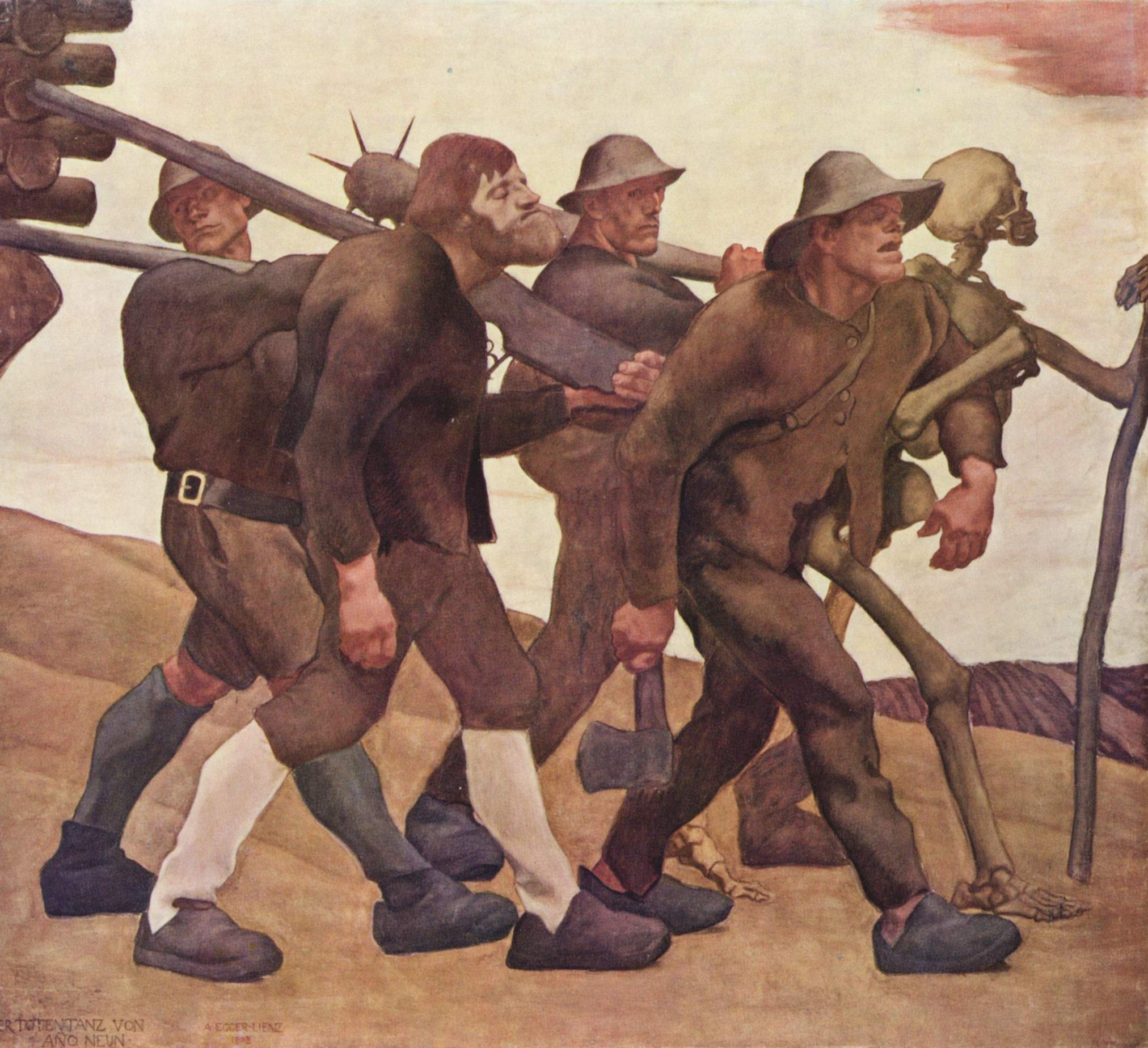
Der Totentanz von Anno Neun (1906–1908)

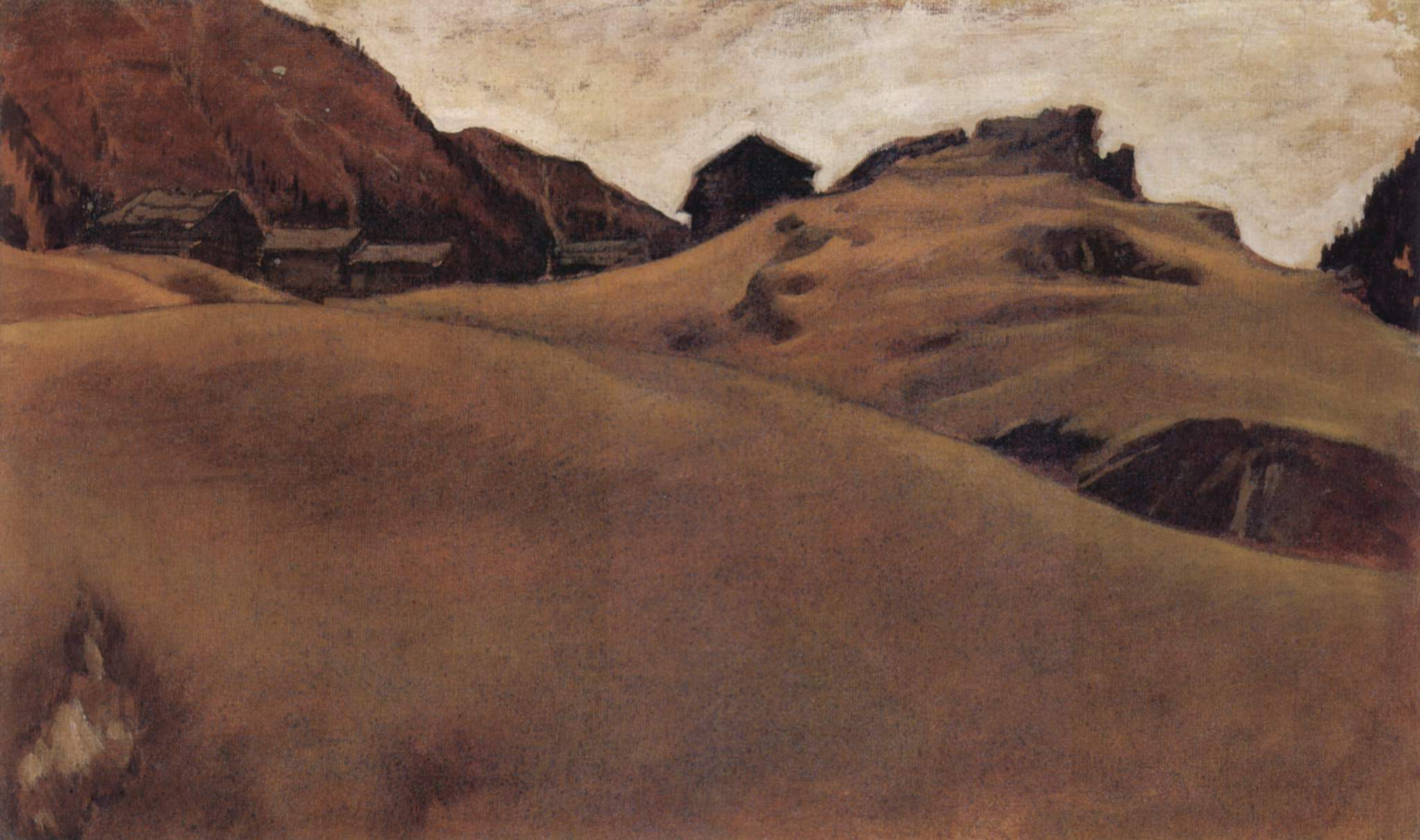
Almlandschaft im Ötztal (1911)

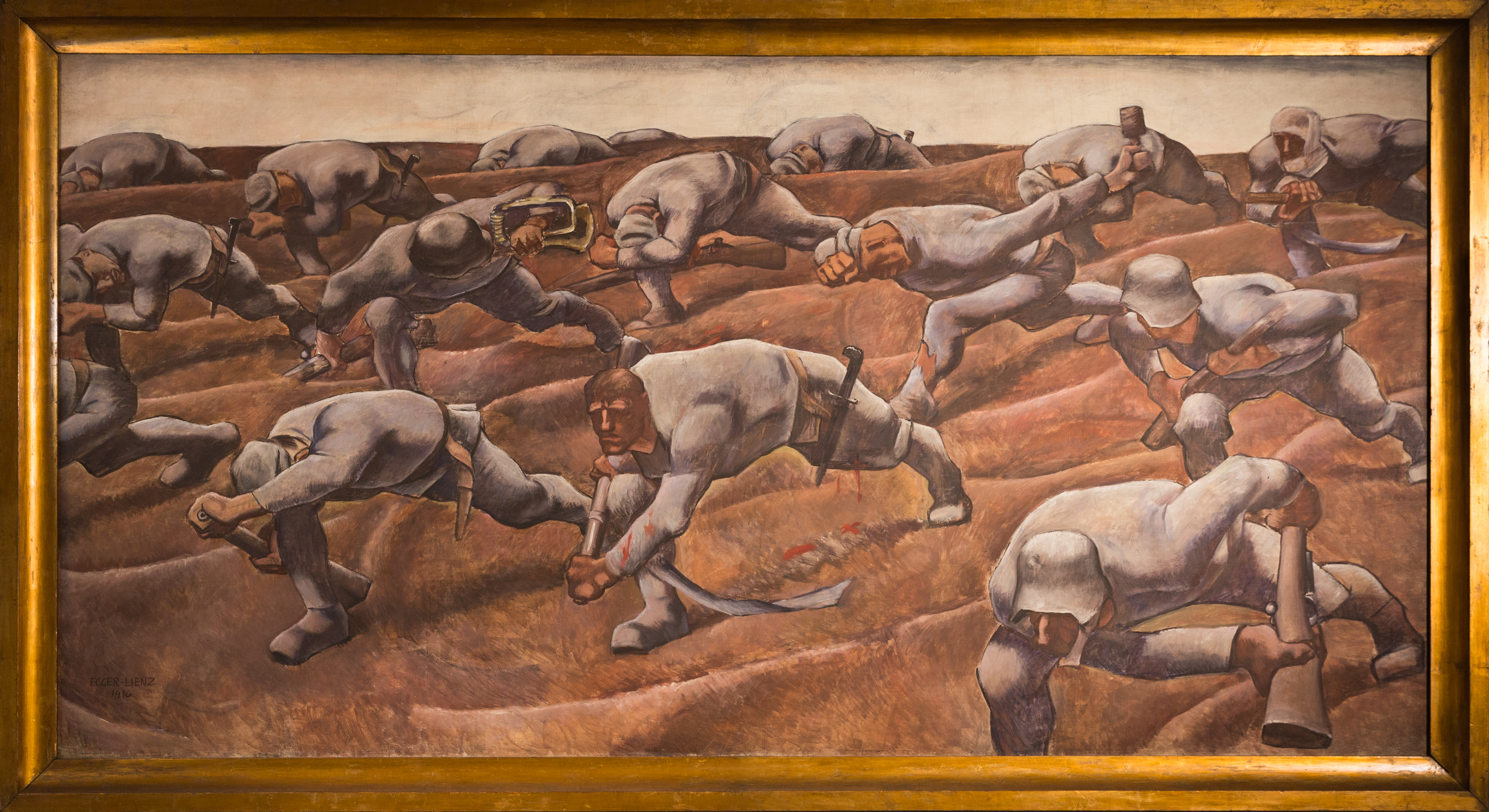
Den Namenlosen, Heeresgeschichtliches Museum Wien (1916)

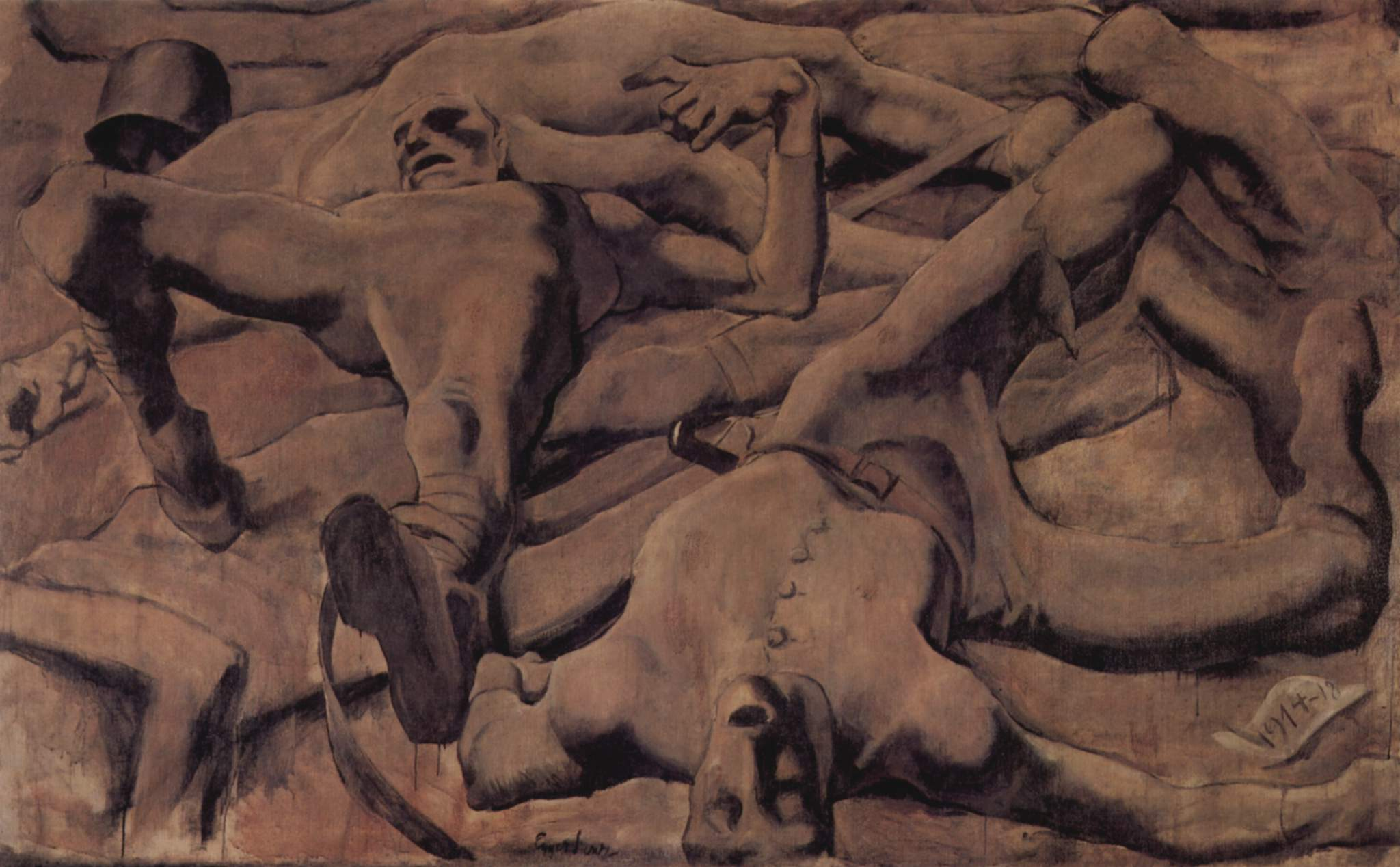
Finale (1918)

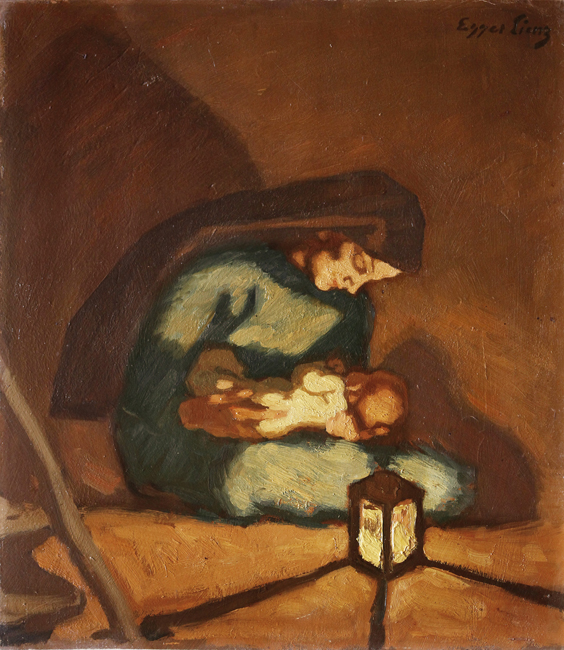
Madonna (c. 1920–1922)

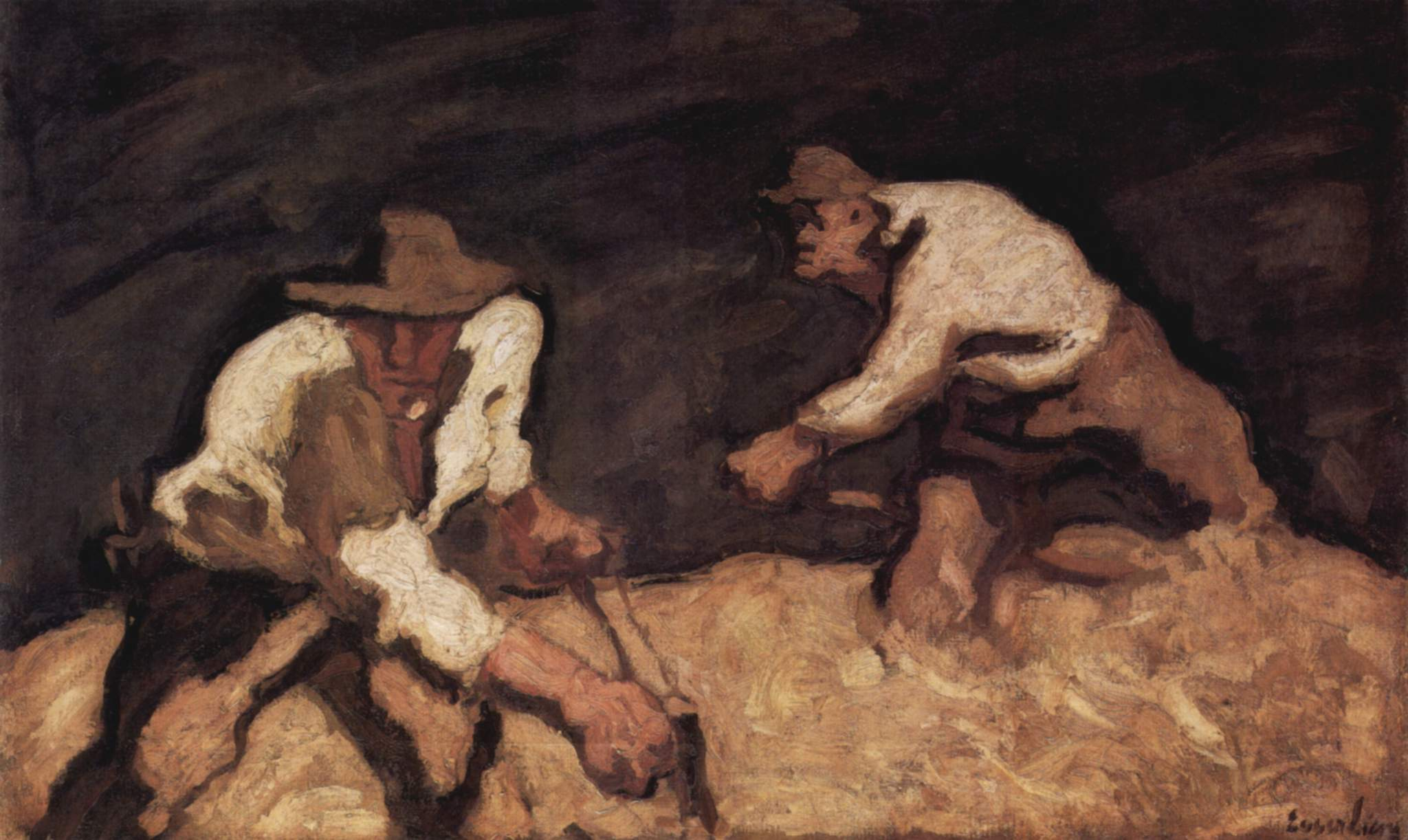
Die Schnitter (Die Bergmäher bei aufsteigendem Gewitter) (1922)

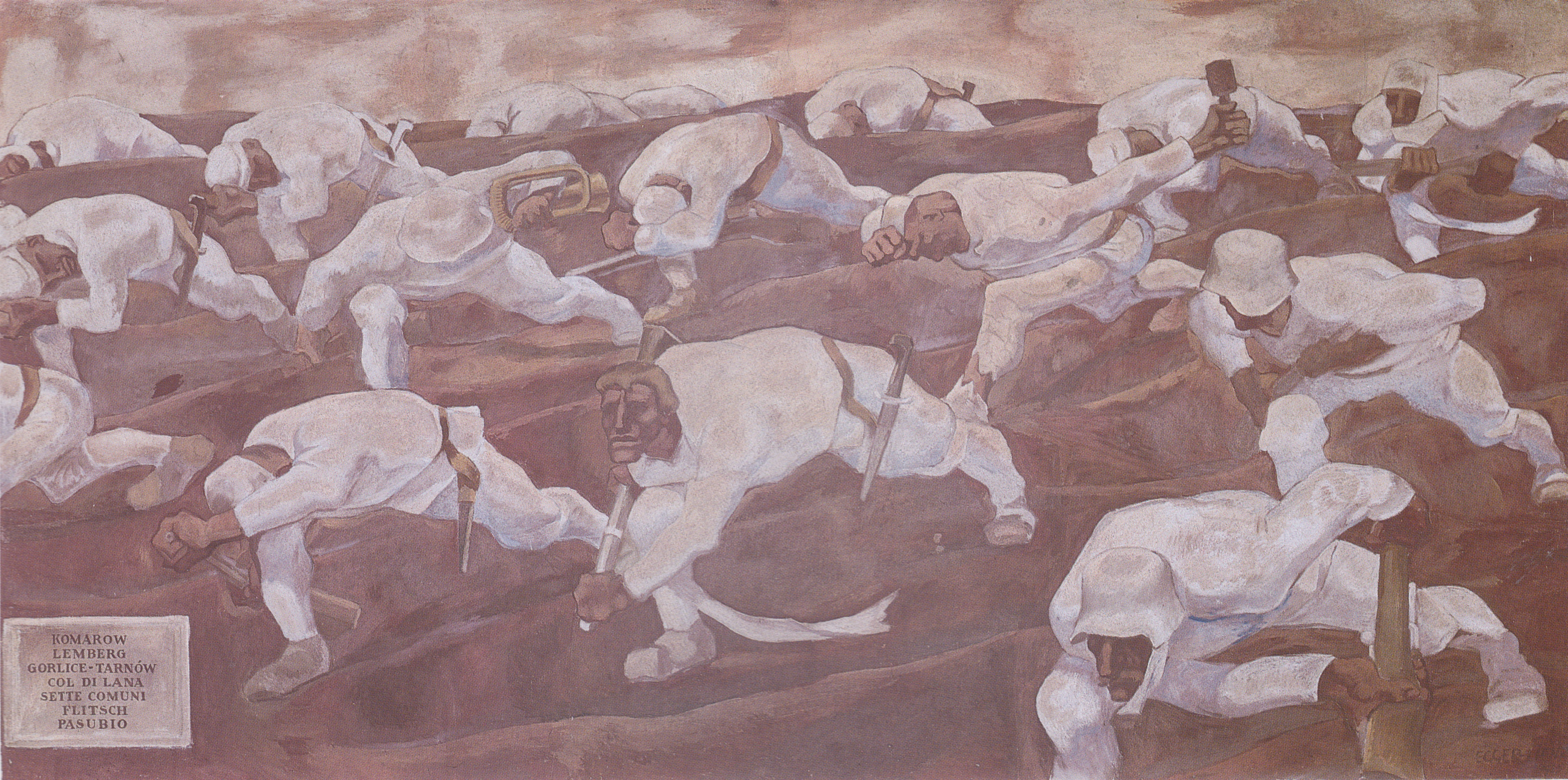
Sturm. Den Namenlosen (1925) Fresco in the war memorial chapel in Lienz, Austria

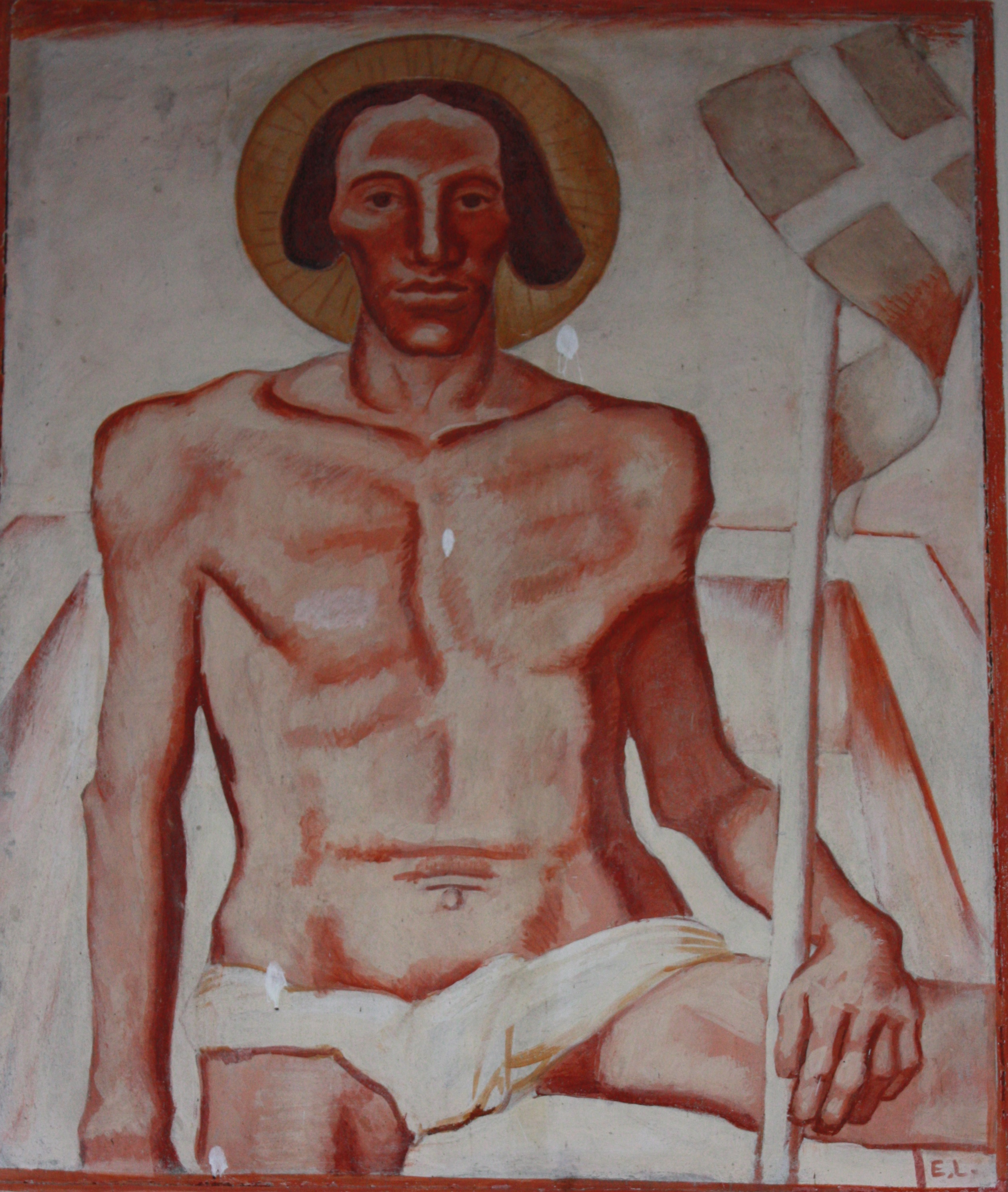
Auferstanderner Christus (fresco, 1925)
