= Hengameh Mofid =

Iranian actress, director, dramatist and university tutor

- هنگامه مفيد
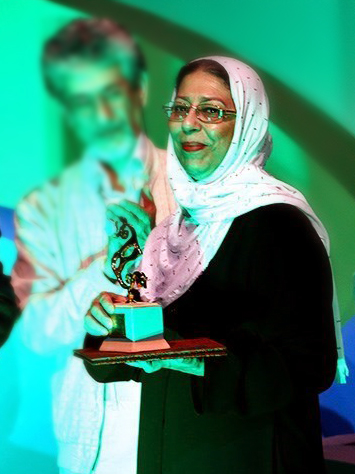
- Born: 22 December 1955 (age 70); Tehran, Imperial State of Iran
- Occupations: Actress, director, dramatist, university tutor
- Spouse: Kambiz Samimi Mofakham (died 1997)
- Children: 3, including Yashar and Idin
- Relatives: Bijan Mofid (brother); Bahman Mofid (brother)

Hengameh Mofid (Persian: هنگامه مفيد, born 22 December 1955) is an Iranian film and theatre actress, director, dramatist, musician and university tutor.

== Life ==
She was born in January 1956 in Tehran, Iran. She is the youngest child of Gholamhossein Mofid, a well-known actor, teacher and calligrapher and his wife, Ghodssiyeh Farivar, a high school headmistress. Her family is one of the most famous and well-known families in Iranian theater and cinema and Persian literature.

Her brothers Bijan, Bahman and Ardavan are all in the theater business. It was their father, who was a famous actor and theatre director of his time and his oldest son, Bijan Mofid- one of the most important Iranian playwrights and theatre directors of all times, who indirectly- encouraged the younger ones to be in theatre as well.

Raised in such an artful environment, She entered Tehran Conservatory and after graduating, she entered Art College in Tehran. Meanwhile, she was a member in the only professional theater group working specially for children at the Institute for the Intellectual Development of Children and Young Adults (IIDCYA, aka. Kanoon) under the supervision of American theatre director, Don Roger Laffoon. There she met her future husband and longtime collaborator, Kambiz Samimi Mofakham. They married in 1977 and have three children; all of them are in art business.

Being the first and best in children's theater, Kanoon Theater group did many performances including Shāparak Khānoum (lit. Miss Butterfly), The cloak of thousand tales, Kouti & Mouti, An event in The Puppet Town and so forth. They also performed in the Hamburg, Wales and Sydney International festivals and had workshops for children all over the world.

== Expanding career ==
Eventually, after the 1979 Iranian Revolution and due to the restrictions against women, Hengameh leaves kanoon – that really was not active for so long - and continue her career as voice actress in 4 story records under the "Chehel Tooti" records contract and also recorded a children's favorite nursery songs album" Little Songs" that still is the no.1 in children music records in Iran- with the same company.

She also began a new career as a teacher in kindergarten and elementary schools that leads to establishing a private kindergarten with her husband and her twin brother, Houman, and was the headmistress there for 5 years.

Since 1983, she had a collaboration with children department of IRIB (Islamic Republic of Iran Broadcasting) in fields such as writing, acting, directing, song writing, and composing. She said that working for children, as a teacher, help her to stay connected to their fantasy world. According to her supporters, Mofid's "special talent in thinking as a child and a grownup in the same time" makes her one of the successful writers for children.

According to herself, "Storytelling is one of the oldest, most common and most effective forms of art. Everyone knows how a good story can make quarrelsome children forget their quarrel and get them together." And also "Storytelling is a direct connection between children and grownups, and it can be as simple and friendly as a good conversation."

Following the 1979 Iranian Revolution and the subsequent closure of universities under the pretext of the Cultural Revolution, all universities were shut down for cleansing, and Mofid was unable to attend university and complete her studies for nearly ten years. Ultimately, she completed her education at the University of Tehran, graduating in Dramatic Literature in 1988.

Since 2000, along with other activities, Mofid has a continuous collaboration with art universities as theater, music and play writing tutor.

She also works with amateur theater groups as voice and acting instructor.

== Activities and works ==
Literary works for puppet tele-theaters and TV series

As writer and director:

- The Farm of Bibi khanoon (first season) (مزرعه بی بی خانوم)
- The Farm of Bibi khanoon (second season) (مزرعه بی بی خانوم)
- Night Time Stories (قصه های شبانه)
- Flower Time "Mo-seme Gol" (موسم گل)
- The Little Cook (live TV. series) (آشپز کوچولو)
- Dara & Sara (live TV. series) (دارا و سارا)
- Sootak & Tootak (سوتک و توتک)

As scriptwriter, voice actress, songwriter and music composer (TV. series)

- Cloud, Wind, Moon And Sun (Dir. K. Samimi Mofakham)(ابر و باد و مه و خورشيد)
- Sonny And Daddy (Dir. K. Samimi Mofakham) (داداش و باباش)
- Miss Nazanin (Nazanin khanoom) (Dir. R. Ahmadi) (نازنين خانوم)
- Water, Water, Life (Dir. K. Samimi Mofakham) (آب، آب، زندگی)
- Mr. Mabaada (Dir. K. Samimi Mofakham) (آقای مبادا)
- Gholamhossein Khan Asl Tehrani - a TV. series about city of Tehran at the old times according to Gholamhossein khan, the puppet character- (Dir. M. Boroumand) (غلامحسين خان اصل تهرانی)
- Hooshi, Gooshi and Mom (Dir. A. Bezdoudeh)
- Grannie's house (Dir. M. Boroumand) (خونه مادر بزرگه)
- The Adventures Of Taghi Jan ( Dir. H. Pourshirazi) (ماجراهای تقی جان)
- Lazybones "Roofoozeh" (Dir. M. Mahboob) (رفوزه)
- The Singing Bialou (Dir. M. Boroumand) (بیالوی آوازه خان)
- The Drifters (Dir. A. Seddigh) (در به در ها)

As voice actress

- Allesoon & Vallesoon (Dir. K. Samimi Mofakham) (السون و ولسون)
- The Starling And The Wise Hoopoe (Dir. I.Tahmasb)
- The Itsy-Bitsy Sparrow (Dir. K. Samimi Mofakham) (گنجشکک اشی مشی)

Plays:

Appearances

Children and young adults plays from 1971 to 1978, The professional theater group, the Institute for the Intellectual Development of children and Young Adults (Kanoon), directed by: Don Roger Laffoon Ardavan Mofid

- The Butterfly (Shaparak khanoom) (شاپرک خانوم)
- The Turnip (ترب)
- Kouti & Mouti (کوتی و موت)
- Rise And Shine Miss Sun (khorshid khanoom aaftaab kon) (خورشید خانوم آفتاب کن)
- An Event In The Puppet Town (حادثه ای در شهر عروسک ها)
- The Cloak Of Thousand Tales (شنل هزار قصه)
- The Robots
- Maktab Khaneh (مکتب خانه)
- Aria De Capo (آريا دکاپو)
- The Eagle And The Fox (عقاب و روباه)
- The Sleeping Luck (Bakhte khofteh) (بخت خفته)
- Rostam & Sohraab (رستم و سهراب)

Appearances in plays for adults

- The Moon And The Leopard (written & Directed by: Bijan Mofid) 1971 (ماه و پلنگ)
- Sohraab, Horse And Dragonfly (written & Directed by: Bijan Mofid) 1978 (سهراب و اسب و سنجاقک)

As songwriter and music composer

- The Gold Tooth (Dir. D.Mirbagheri) 2001 (دندون طلا)
- A tableau of Love" Pardeh Asheghi" (Dir. D.Mirbagheri) 2002 (پرده عاشقی)

As director

- The Eagle And The Fox 2004 (عقاب و روباه)

AS writer

- Pahlevan Kachal and Ververeh jadoo (Dir. H. Jeddikar) (پهلوان کچل و وروره جادو)

Cinema:

- The Drifters –feature film version- (As scriptwriter, songwriter and voice actress) (در به در ها)
- Once Upon a Time ( Songwriter and voice actress) (یکی بود یکی نبود)
- Children of Iran -a series of feature films, Dir. M. Sarhangi- ( As narrator) (بچه های ايران)
- Lala & Loulou- animated film, Dir. F. Sorkhabi- (As narrator and voice actress) (لالا و لولو)
- The Refugee – live action feature film Dir. R. Mollagholipour- (As actress) (پناهنده)
- Golnaar – children fantasy film, Dir. Kambuzia Partovi- (voice actress) (گلنار)
- Squash Girl –Dir. R. Jian- (voice actress)

Children Story Record Albums

Chehel tooti Co. albums:

- The Butterfly (Shaparak khanoom) (شاپرک خانوم)
- The Turnip (ترب)
- Kouti & Mouti (کوتی و موت)
- The Wonderful Farm (Les contes du chat perché) (دم گربه)
- First Fly (اولين پرواز)
- Little Songs (favorite nursery songs) (ترانه های کوچک برای بيداری)

Others:

- The Sparrow And The Cotton Boll (as Narrator) (گنجشکک و يک غوزه)
- Six Raven Chicks And a Fox (Kanoon) (شش جوجه کلاغ و يک روباه)
- A children's Tale (M. Azadi)
- Golnaar ( Khaneh Honar va Adabiat) (گلنار)

Educating:

- Art Teacher at elementary schools ( Ministry of Education)
- Municipality Zone No.10, kindergartens supervisor ( Ministry of Education)
- Concessionaire and headmistress of a private kindergarten for 5 years
- Headmistress and supervisor at the "Behesht Cultural Centre"
- Organizing Workshops at International puppet Theater Festival, Tehran, Iran
- Organizing Workshops with Kalagh Art Group

Puppet Theater and Performing art tutor at:

- Soureh Art University
- University of Tehran, Faculty of Fine Art
- Art University, Faculty of Cinema & Theater

Other Activities From 1971 to 1978

- Member of professional children and young adults' theater at The institute for the intellectual development of children and young adults (Kanoon)
- Participation in the Humburg, Wales and Sidney International theater festivals for children and young adults
- Participation in Folklore dance Festival at Australia, Canberra
- Member of The Itinerant Theater (Kanoon)

Recent Activities

- Member of selection committee in Tehran International Puppet Festival For University Students 2005
- Member of selection committee in The Mobarak Unima International Puppet Festival 2006

Awards:

- Honorary Title and Highest insignia of the Academy of Dramatic Arts for Lifetime Achievement in Dramatic Arts
- Honorary Title and Highest insignia of the International Puppet Theater of Tehran
- Honorary Title and Highest insignia of the Municipality of Tehran for Lifetime Achievement in Arts
- Best Play award for writing the "Girls from the Gardens of Carpet" at Fajr International Festival
- Best Directing award for "night time stories" at The Fourth Television Festival

== See also ==
- List of Iranians
- List of Persian poets and authors
