= Parvaneh Etemadi =

Iranian visual artist (1948–2025)

- پروانه اعتمادی
- Born: 25 February 1948; Tehran, Iran
- Died: 21 March 2025 (aged 77)
- Other name: Parvaneh E'temadi
- Education: University of Tehran
- Occupations: Visual artist, painter, collagist, draftsperson, printmaker
- Spouse: Ruyin Pakbaz

Parvaneh Etemadi (Persian: پروانه اعتمادی, romanized: Parvāneh Etemādi; 25 February 1948 – 21 March 2025) was an Iranian visual artist who worked as a painter, draftsperson, printmaker, and collagist. She was mostly known for her still life drawings on a cement support. Etemadi was a renowned female artist in Iran, and internationally.

== Early life and education ==
Parvaneh Etemadi was born on 25 February 1948 in Tehran, and she was raised in Birjand in South Khorasan province, Iran.

She attended the University of Tehran in the College of Fine Arts, but did not graduate. She was mentored in painting under Bahman Mohasses, and is considered his only direct student.

== Career ==
Her first solo exhibition was in 1969 at Ghandriz Gallery in Tehran; and between 1967 and 1977, she regularly showed her work there alongside other artists working in the modernism movement.

She publicly said she did not like to be labeled as a 'woman artist' or as a 'feminist artist', and believed her work resonates more with the, "agony and ecstasy of poetry". In 2019, Tarrahan Azad Gallery in Tehran held a retrospective of her work.

In her book Good Morning... Good Night. Cinque artiste e una curatrice dall'Iran, Iranian curator Tarlan Rafiee offers an exploration of Etemadi's artistic journey. She delves into Etemadi's renowned “cement works,” highlighting how these pieces reflect the artist's personal experiences and surroundings. Rafiee emphasizes Etemadi's unique perspective as a female artist in Iran, noting her ability to authentically portray her world without comparison to male counterparts:

“Parvaneh Etemadi, born in Tehran in 1947, is a seminal Iranian artist known for her intimate, autobiographical works. Her celebrated ‘cement works’—nudes and still lifes etched onto cement-coated panels—embody a deeply feminine vision that defied the male-dominated art scene of pre-revolutionary Iran. Eschewing comparison with male peers, Etemadi’s art reflects a lifelong exploration of womanhood, memory, and domestic space. Her post-revolution collages and drawings, often incorporating personal photographs, evoke a nostalgic yet critical gaze.”

Her group exhibition history spans three decades and multiple continents, including participation in the International Art Fair in Basel, Switzerland (1976), a group exhibition at Cité des Arts in Paris (1978), and a presentation of Contemporary Iranian Art at Foxley/Leach Gallery in Washington D.C. (1978). She also participated in an exhibition of Iranian art in Beijing and Shanghai (1978).

Etemadi sat in front of Bahman Kiarostami's camera for eight months to film a documentary about her named, Parvaneh (2020).

== Death and legacy ==
Etemadi died on 21 March 2025, at the age of 77.

She was described by writer Myriam Ben Salah in Artforum as, "a major figure on the Tehrani scene and a mentor to many young artists."

Following her death in March 2025, the documentary Parvaneh (2020), directed by Bahman Kiarostami, continued to screen internationally. The film offers an exploration of her life and artistic legacy, revealing her strength in navigating the male-dominated Iranian art scene and the patriarchal society around her. The Cinematheque in Vancouver screened the documentary in August 2025, accompanied by a public audience discussion.

Her work is in the public museum collection at the British Museum in London, and the Centre Pompidou in Paris.

== See also ==
- List of Iranian women artists
