= Idin Samimi Mofakham =

Iranian composer

Idin Samimi Mofakham آیدین صمیمی مفخم
- Born: 1982 (age 43–44); Tehran, Iran
- Occupation: Composer
- Spouse: Martyna Kosecka

Idin Samimi Mofakham (b. 1982; Persian: آیدین صمیمی مفخم) is an Iranian composer, born in 1982 to Hengameh Mofid and Kambiz Samimi Mofakham. He is married to Polish composer, Martyna Kosecka.

== Biography ==
He studied contemporary composition at the Komitas State Conservatory of Yerevan with Ashot Zohrabian as his professor.

In 2009, his piece "Pastorale" for flute trio won the first prize at the Areon Flutes International Composition Competition.

Samimi Mofakham's compositions have been commissioned or selected and performed in different festivals by ensembles such as Klangforum Wien, S.E.M Ensemble, Hermes Ensemble, Omnibus Ensemble, AuditivVokal Dresden, Momenta Quartet, IAMA Trio, National Symphonic Orchestra of Uzbekistan, Ostravská Banda, Stockholm Saxophone Quartet, Nivak Ensemble and Nilper Orchestra, and has been a participant of many interviews and lectures in his home country, covered by one of the most important Iranian music journals, Musice Ma, Music Report Monthly and Musice Iranian. Published by Tehran Records in 2017 album "Concertos" has been nominated in 2017 for the Musicema Awards in the category of the best album of the year.

His chamber opera At the Waters of Lethe based on the libretto by Martyna Kosecka, was commissioned by Ostrava Center for New Music (OCNM) and performed at NODO / New Opera Days Ostrava 2016.

He has committed himself to the development of musical education system in Iran, establishing the department of music composition at the University of Applied Science and Technology in Tehran. His book The Harmonic Ear Training has been implemented as one of the teaching sources for ear training classes in Iran.

Since 2016, Idin Samimi Mofakham holds a position of artistic co-director to Tehran Contemporary Music Festival.

Altogether with Martyna Kosecka, he also performs in the ensemble of electroacoustic music called SpectroDuo.

Since 2019, Samimi Mofakham resides in Norway and conducts an artistic research at the Norwegian Academy of Music.
