= Museum of Contemporary Art, Isfahan =

Isfahan Museum of Contemporary Arts
- موزه هنرهای معاصر اصفهان
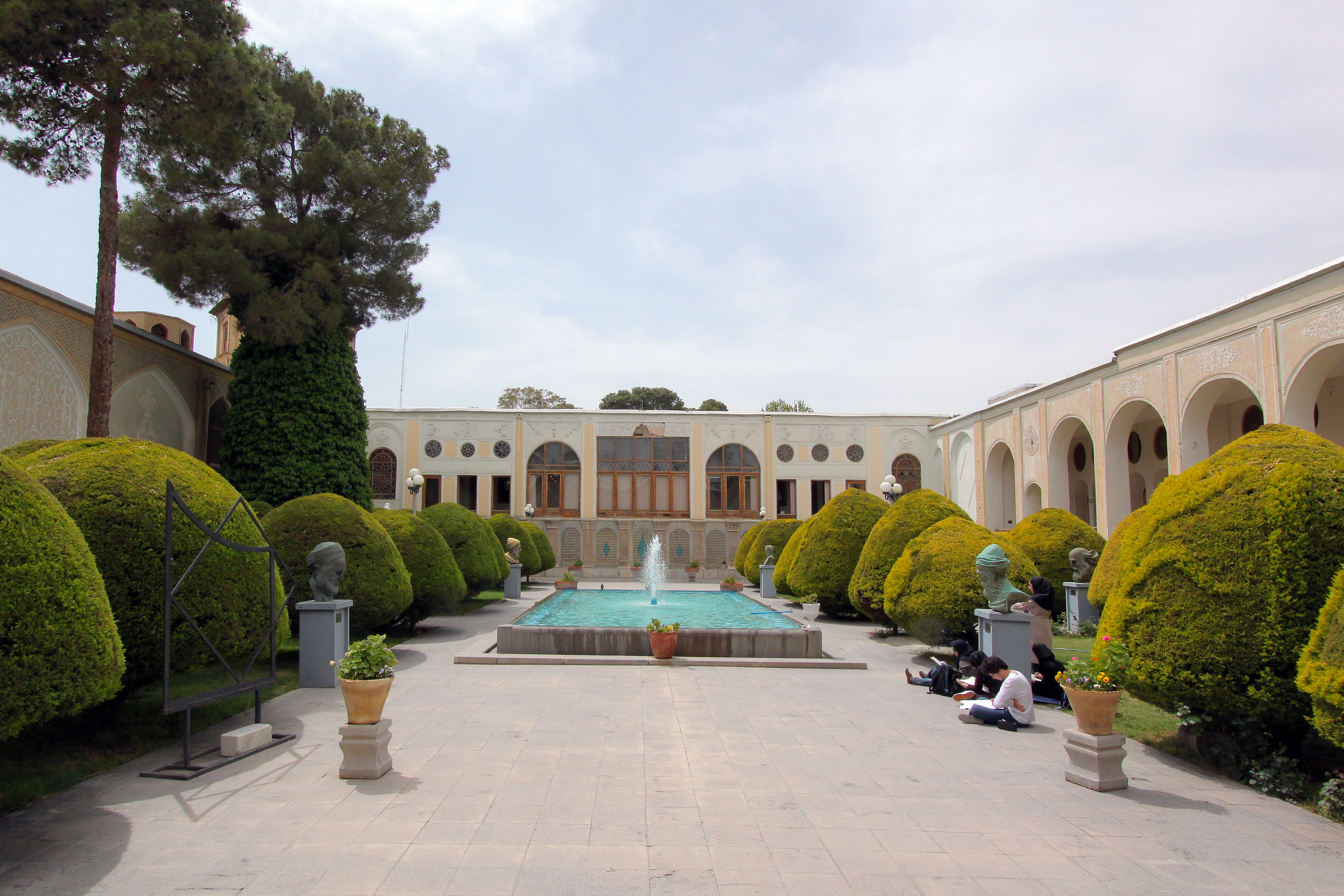
- Arts Museum of Isfahan

- Location within Iran

General information
- Status: Cultural
- Type: Museum
- Architectural style: Isfahani
- Location: Isfahan, Iran
- Coordinates: 32.6580°N 51.6741°E
- Opened: 17th century
- Owner: Cultural Heritage, Handcrafts and Tourism Organization

The Museum of Contemporary Art is a contemporary art museum in Isfahan, Iran, located next to the Museum of Natural History. The museum is housed in the Chaharbagh Palace, originally built in 17th century under Safavid rule.

== Building ==
Dates from the 17th century, the building was a small royal museum during the Safavid period, located near Chehel Sotoun palace and the center of Isfahan. It was known as Jobbeh Khaneh (house of weapons) in the Safavid period, as the museum housed a collection of military artifacts. Rebuilt during Qajar rule, the building has been decorated by stuccoed forms, which are the principal architectural feature of the Qajar period. There are many patterns of flowers and vase, which are a distinctive feature of decoration in the Qajar period. This feature is one that distinguishes the Qajar age from the Safavid age, in which flowers were never in vases.

== Museum ==
The museum is open from 9 a.m. to 12 p.m. and from 5 to 8 p.m. in the spring and summer. In the autumn and winter, it is open from 9 a.m. to 12 p.m. and 4 to 7 p.m.
