= Jazeh Tabatabai =

Iranian artist (1931–2008)

- ژازه تباتبایی
- Born: 17 January 1931; Tehran, Imperial State of Iran
- Died: 9 February 2008 (aged 77); Tehran, Iran
- Known for: Painting, drawing, sculpting, poetry, playwriting

Jazeh Tabatabai (Persian: ژازه تباتبایی; 17 January 1931 – 9 February 2008) was an Iranian avant-garde painter, poet, and sculptor. He was the founder and director of the Iran Modern Art Gallery in Tehran, Iran. Tabatabai's fame is mostly due to his creative figures and metal sculptures which he assembled with parts from old machinery and cars.

His style is close to the Saqqakhaneh school (Saqqā-ḵāna); lion-women and suns are repeating themes in his work. For this reason, he is cited alongside a handful of other influential Iranian artists as a pioneer of Iranian modern and contemporary art. Tabatabai received over 10 major international awards for his paintings and sculptures.

== Biography ==
Tabatabai was born on 17 January 1931, in Tehran, Pahlavi Iran. He wrote his first story, titled "Sand and Straw", at the age of 12 and subsequently entered other artistic fields. He went on to write and direct such plays as "Withering Blossoms", "Lord Chichi Yanf", "Footstep", and "Mister Muchul", and produced another of his own plays called "Scout Association". In 1947 he published "The Little Boy", a story.

In 1951, Tabatabai earned a diploma from the School of Arts and displayed his art, which was then miniatures at his first art exhibition. Four years later he achieved the position of top student in the Film Direction and Principles of Theatre program at the Iranian College of Literature and produced the play "Sailor's Shirt".

In 1961, he completed his college courses and established the Modern Iran Art Gallery on Takht Jamshid Street, the first art gallery in Iran.

== Works ==
Tabatabai's works can be found in major collections and in many museums around the globe including the Louvre and the Metropolitan Museum of Art. Additionally, his works have been displayed in exhibitions in England, India, Italy, Germany, Spain, Greece, Australia, France and the United States.

The Artists' House Khaneh-ye Honarmandan in Tehran held an exhibition of Tabatabai's sculptures at the turn of 2018 and 2019.

In 1967, Khosrow Sinai directed a film about Tabatabai's work called "Biography". In 1997, he made another film on the artist's life called "Autumn Road".

== Later life ==
In his later years Tabatabai lived in Spain, spending some time each year in Iran.

He died after health complications from an infection on 9 February 2008, at Tehran's Atieh Hospital; three weeks after his 77th birthday.
