= Charles R. H. Tripp =

British academic and author (born 1952)

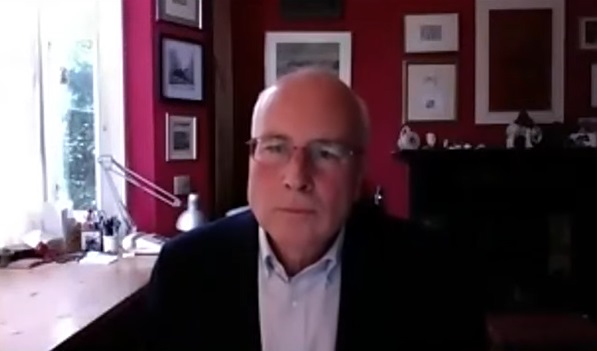
Professor Tripp during an online Zoom conference in 2021

Charles Rees Howard Tripp, FBA (born 8 March 1952) is an academic and author specializing in the politics and history of the Near and Middle East.

== Early life and education ==
Tripp was born on 8 March 1952 in Sudan. He was educated at Winchester College, then an all-boys independent boarding school in Winchester, Hampshire, England. He then studied at New College, Oxford (BA) and the School of Oriental and African Studies, University of London (MSc, PhD).

== Academic career ==
Tripp's main areas of research include the study of state and society in the Middle East, especially Iraq, and Islamic political thought.

He lectured on government and politics of the Middle East for both undergraduates and postgraduates at the School of Oriental and African Studies (SOAS), a college of the University of London.

Tripp is a world class specialist on Iraq and has contributed as regional expert to media broadcasters including the BBC and NPR, as well as to print media such as Foreign Affairs, The Guardian and the New Statesman. In the run up to the war against Iraq, Professor Tripp was part of a small team that visited 10 Downing Street in order to advise the prime minister, Tony Blair, on the consequences of going to war.

In 2007, SOAS appointed him Professor of Politics with reference to the Middle East and North Africa. On 19 November 2008, he gave his inaugural lecture as professor at SOAS entitled "The Riotous Politics of the Middle East", in which he was presented by Oxford International Relations professor Avi Shlaim. In 2017, he retired from SOAS and was made an emeritus professor.

In 2012, Tripp was elected a Fellow of the British Academy (FBA), the United Kingdom's national academy for the humanities and social sciences. From 2018 to 2022, he was Vice-President (British International Research Institutes) of the British Academy.

Tripp is a member of the editorial advisory board for the website EXPeditions.

== Selected publications ==
- 1996: Iran-Saudi Arabia Relations and Regional Order (with S. Chubin)
- 2000: A History of Iraq (2nd Ed. published 2002; 3rd Ed. published 2007)
- 2006: Islam and the Moral Economy: the challenge of capitalism (2006)
- 2013: The Power and the People: paths of resistance in the Middle East (Cambridge University Press)

== Editorial work ==
- 1995-2008: Editor of the multidisciplinary Cambridge Middle East Studies series
- 2025- : Advisory editorial board member for EXPeditions – The living library of knowledge
