= Peter Assmann =

Austrian writer and visual artist

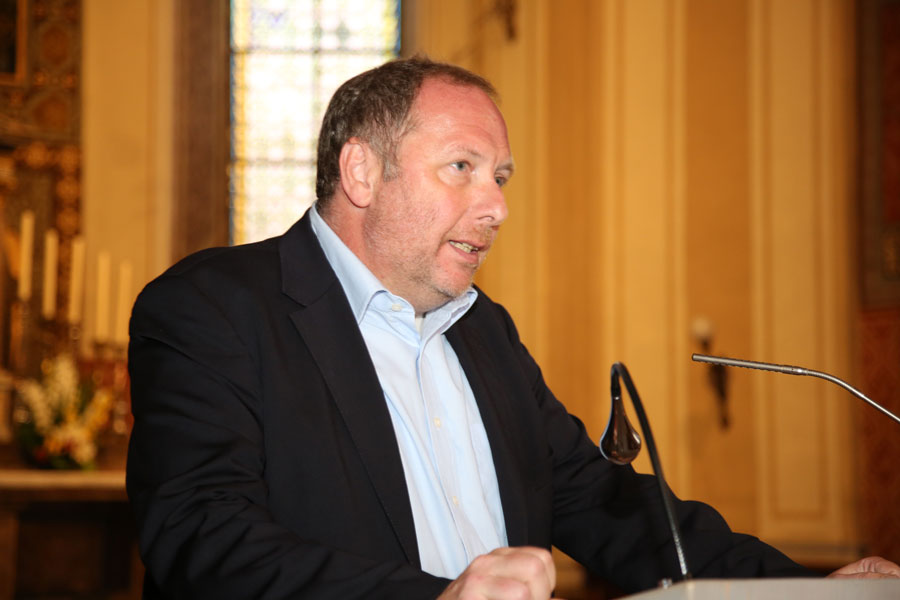
- Peter Assmann 2014
- Born: 28 August 1963 (age 63); Zams, Tyrol, Austria
- Education: University of Innsbruck
- Occupations: Art historian, curator, writer, visual artist

Peter Assmann (born 28 August 1963 in Zams) is an Austrian art historian, curator, writer, and visual artist.

== Early life and education ==
Peter Assmann was born on 28 August 1963, in Zams, Austria. Assmann studied art history, history and German studies at the University of Innsbruck, where he received a doctorate degree after writing his thesis about historical fresco murals of the Santa Maria Novella monastery.

== Career ==
Assmann became director of the Upper Austrian State Museums, later abandoning the position on 31 March 2013, due to changes in the structure of the organisation. Between years 2013 and 2014, Assmann served as director of Museum Angerlehner in Thalheim, near Wels.

A writer since 1995, Assmann also founded the writers group Institut für Kunstinitiativen und Sinnenbrand, Assmann is also an active member of writers groups such as Wiener Künstlerhauses, the Welser Künstlergilde and IG Bildende Kunst.

Between 2002 and 2012, Assmann served as president for the Museumsbundes Österreich (translation: Austrian Museum Association); between 2009 and 2014, Assmann was also a board member for the Network of European Museum Organisations (NEMO). Assmann also served on the board of directors for NGO SOS-Menschenrechte Österreich (SOS Human Rights Austria), an organisation that provides humanitarian aid to refugees.

In 2015, Assmann served as director of Ducal Palace, Mantua. Assmann lost this position in 2017, during administrative court proceedings resulting from a formal error in the appeals process; Assmann later re-gained the position on 16 June 2017, with help from the Italian Council of State. By 2018, the court action against Assmann's directorship was thrown out by Consiglio di Stato (Italian Council of State).

On 1 November 2019, Assmann assumed management of the Tyrolean State Museums Operating Company, which manages the Tyrolean State Museum. Assmann later terminated the contract via special agreement, on 31 December 2022.

== Literary works ==
- Orte (translation: Places), dabei, Arovell Verlag, Gosau 2011
- Karl Hauk, Provincial Library (Bibliothek der Provinz), Weitra 2008
- Der Maler Aloys Wach (translation: Aloys Wach, the painter), G.-M. Bock, Frankfurt am Main 2007
- Bereits Bemerktes (translation: Already Noticed), Arovell Verlag, Gosau 2006
- Obsessions, Provincial Library (Bibliothek der Provinz), Weitra 2006
- und Erotisches, Arovell Verlag, Wien-Gosau 2018
