= Tyrolean State Museum =

Coordinates: 47.2673275°N 11.3977336°E

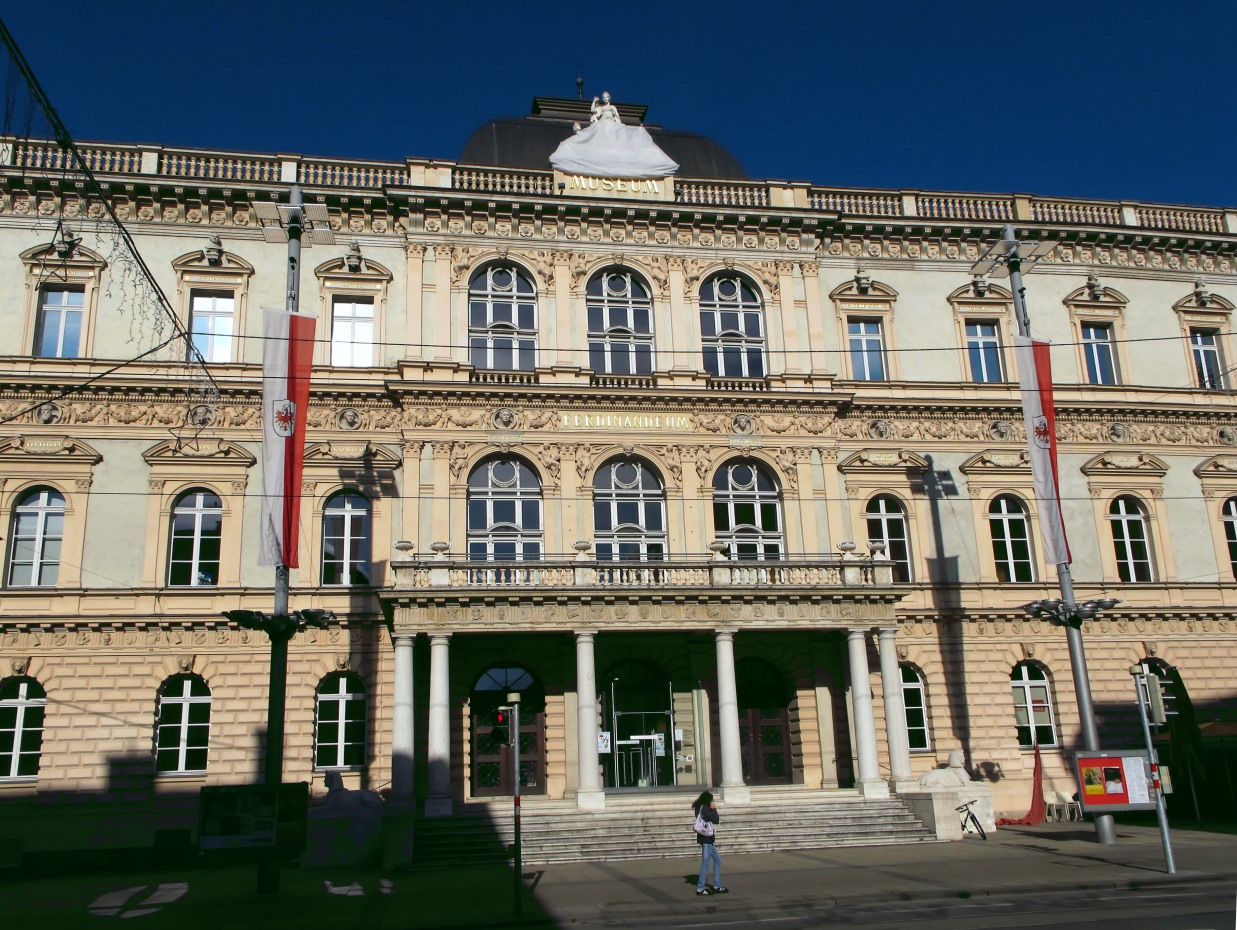
Ferdinandeum

The Tyrolean State Museum (German: Tiroler Landesmuseum), also known as the Ferdinandeum after Archduke Ferdinand, is located in Innsbruck, Austria. It was founded in 1823 by the Tyrolean State Museum Ferdinandeum Society (Verein Tiroler Landesmuseum Ferdinandeum).

Since 2007 it has been a major division of the Tyrolean State Museums Operating Company (Tiroler Landesmuseen-Betriebsgesellschaft), which has taken over the running of the business. Also transferred to the operating company at the same time were the Tyrolean Museum of Popular Art, the Kaiserschützen Museum, the Chapel Royal (Hofkirche) and the Tyrolean Folk Song Archives (Tiroler Volksliedarchiv). The company is run by Wolfgang Meighörner, who is also the curator of the Tyrolean State Museum Ferdinandeum.

The Tyrolean State Museum comprises seven collections. In addition, the Museum in the Armoury (historic and technical collection of the cultural history of Tyrol) and the natural history collection also belong to the Ferdinandeum.

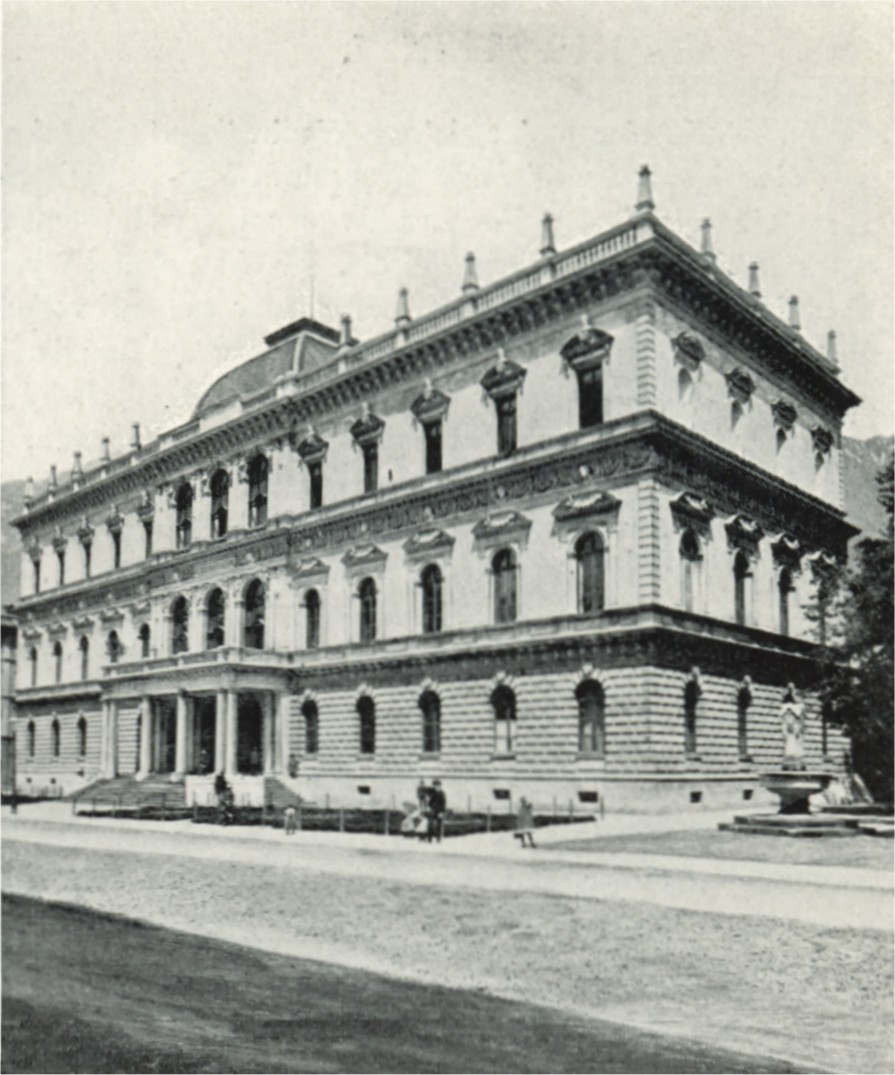
The State Museum around 1898

The main collections of the Tyrolean State Museum cover:

- History from prehistoric times through the Roman era to the Early Middle Ages,
- Art and crafts from Romanesque through Gothic to Modern,
- The Netherlands collection and music room with Jakob Stainer instruments,
- Works of art including those by Michael Pacher, Lucas Cranach der Ältere, Rembrandt van Rijn, Joseph Anton Koch, Angelica Kauffman, Franz Defregger and Albin Egger-Lienz.
- The library whose main emphasis is the Tyrol
- Personal collection of Albert Joseph Gasteiger Khan, including his personal archives and the collection of Qajar art

The building complex was renovated in 2003 and some parts were added to.

The natural and human science activity of the museum has been documented since 2008 in the Scientific Yearbook of the Tyrolean State Museum (Wissenschaftliches Jahrbuch der Tiroler Landesmuseen). It is a successor to the older publications: Zeitschrift des Ferdinandeums für Tirol und Vorarlberg (1853–1920) and Veröffentlichungen des Museum Ferdinandeum (1921–2007).

In addition the Ferdinandeum issues the reference work, Tiroler Urkundenbuch, which makes the historical sources from the Tyrolean Middle Ages accessible.

== Curators ==
- 1985–2005: Gert Ammann
- 2007–2019: Wolfgang Meighörner
- 2019–2023: Peter Assmann
