= Massoud Arabshahi =

Iranian painter (1935–2019)

- مسعود عربشاهی
- Massoud Arabshahi in 2007
- Born: 1935; Tehran, Imperial State of Iran
- Died: 16 September 2019 (aged 83–84); Tehran, Islamic Republic of Iran
- Education: College of Decorative Arts, Tehran
- Occupation: Artist
- Known for: oil paintings, bas-relief sculptures
- Movement: Saqqakhaneh movement

Massoud Arabshahi (Persian: مسعود عربشاهی; 1935 – 2019), was an Iranian painter, and bas-relief sculptor. He was a leading member of the Saqqakhaneh movement, and was known for his conceptual artwork. Arabshahi had worked in Tehran, Paris, and California.

== Early life and education ==
Massoud Arabshahi was born in 1935 in Tehran, Iran. He attended the Public High School for Fine Arts in Tehran. He studied painting under Shokouh Riazi.

In 1968, he graduated from the College of Decorative Arts at Tehran University (now University of Art).

== Career ==
His sources of inspiration comprise Achaemenid and Assyrian art as well as Babylonian carvings and inscriptions. Combining tradition and modernity. Arabshahi held his first solo exhibition at the Iran-India Centre, Tehran, in 1964, four years before graduating from university.

Arabshahi work's was created in various mediums, including oil paint-on-canvas, architectural bas-reliefs, and other sculptures. Arabshahi's bas-reliefs were commissioned for the Office for Industry and Mining (1971), Tehran; and for the California Insurance Building (1985) in Santa Rosa, California, U.S..

Arabshahi played a pivotal role in establishing the Iran Gallery (Persian: Talar-e Iran) in Tehran, founded in 1964 by Arabshahi, Mansoor Ghandriz, Ruyin Pakbaz, Faramarz Pilaram, Sadegh Tabrizi, Mohammad-Reza Jodat, Ghobad Shiva, Sirus Malek, Farshid Mesghali, Parviz Mahallati, Morteza Momayez, and Hadi Hezareiy. After the death of artist Mansoor Ghandriz in 1966, the Iran Gallery was renamed Ghandriz Gallery (Persian: Talar-e Ghandriz) in his honor; and it remained open until the summer of 1978 during the Iranian Revolution.

In 1975, Marcos Grigorian founded the Independent Artists Group in Tehran. The other founding artists included Arabshahi, Sirak Melkonian, Gholamhossein Nami, Morteza Momayez, Mir Abdolrez Daryabeigi, and Faramarz Pilaram.

Arabshahi's work has been shown in a number of solo and group exhibitions in Iran, Europe and the United States including Two Modernist Iranian Pioneers, at the Tehran Museum of Contemporary Art, 2001; and Iranian Contemporary Art, Barbican Centre, London, 2001.

He died on 16 September 2019, in Tehran, Iran.

== Prizes ==
- 1964, Ministry of Arts and Culture Prize, 4th Tehran Biennial
- 1965, Mother's Day Exhibition Prize, Tehran
- 1972, First Prize, Public contest for sculpture ornament at the Farah-abad Park, Tehran
- 1973, First Prize, Monaco International Exhibition

== Exhibitions ==
- 1964, Tehran, Iran, India Artistic Center
- 1965, Tehran, Iran, Tehran University
- 1965, Paris, France, Biennial
- 1967, Paris, France, Galerie Solstice
- 1967, Paris, France, Museum of Sacred Arts
- 1968, U.S.A, Mobile Exhibition of Contemporary Iranian Arts
- 1970, Tehran, Iran, Modern Iranian Art: a Retrospective, Iran American Society
- 1971, Tehran, Iran, Negar Gallery
- 1973, Paris, France, Grand Palais
- 1973, Paris, France, Galerie Guiot
- 1973, Monaco, France, Monaco International Exhibition, Monte Carlo
- 1974, Tehran, Iran, International Exhibition of Arts
- 1975, Tehran, Iran, Blue, Takhte Jamshid Gallery
- 1975, Tehran, Iran, Volume and Environment, Iran America Society
