= Sadegh Tabrizi =

Iranian painter, calligrapher, designer (1938–2017)

- صادق تبریزی
- Born: 3 March 1938; Tehran, Pahlavi Iran (now Iran)
- Died: 4 December 2017 (aged 79); London, England
- Occupations: Painter, calligrapher, designer, art collector

Sadegh Tabrizi (Persian: صادق تبریزی; 3 March 1938 – 4 December 2017) was an Iranian painter, calligrapher, and designer. He is one of the pioneers of Iranian modern art, and is associated with the Saqqakhaneh movement.

== Early life and education ==
Former emblem of the Islamic Republic of Iran (1980) designed by Tabrizi

Sadegh Tabrizi was born in 1938, in Tehran. He graduated in 1964 from the Faculty of Decorative Arts, Tehran (Persian: Honarestān-e honarhā-ye zibā).

== Career ==
In 1962, he was part of a group exhibition Fourteen Contemporary Iranians at the Ben and Abby Grey Foundation in Minnesota, curated by Parviz Tanavoli.

Tabrizi played a pivotal role in the establishing the Iran Gallery (Persian: Talar-e Iran), founded in 1964 by Tabrizi, Ruyin Pakbaz, Faramarz Pilaram, Mansoor Ghandriz, Mohammad-Reza Jodat, Ghobad Shiva, Massoud Arabshahi, Sirus Malek, Farshid Mesghali, Parviz Mahallati, Morteza Momayez, and Hadi Hezareiy. After the death of artist Mansoor Ghandriz in 1966, the Iran Gallery was renamed Ghandriz Gallery (Persian: Talar-e Ghandriz) in his honor; and it remained open until the summer of 1978 during the Iranian Revolution.

Tabrizi is thought to have been the first Iranian artist to work with traditional calligraphy combined with modern art elements. Tabrizi also designed first official emblem of the Islamic Republic of Iran in 1980, which featured stars and fists in a black version and golden version.

He moved to London due for medical reasons for a few months, and died of an illness related to liver cancer on 4 December 2017, in London.

Tabrizi's artwork can be found in museum collections including at the Grey Art Museum at New York University; the Tehran Museum of Contemporary Art; and the Han China Museum.
