= Mir Abdolreza Daryabeigi =

Iranian artist (1930–2012)

- Born: 30 January 1930; Rasht, Gilan province, Imperial State of Iran
- Died: 1 October 2012 (aged 82); Nogent Sur Marne, France
- Education: University of Tehran, University of Salzburg
- Occupation: Artist

Mir Abdolreza Daryabeigi (Persian: میرعبدالرضا دریابیگی, 30 January 1930 – 1 November 2012), was an Iranian artist, gallerist, and an innovator of Iranian modern art. He was active in Tehran and Paris.

== Biography ==
Mir Abdolreza Daryabeigi was born in Rasht in northern Iran in 1930. He studied and attained bachelor's degrees in both World History and Geography from University of Tehran. After receiving his degrees he studied the composition and techniques of art at the studios of both Marcos Grigorian and Ali Azargin.

He first exhibited his work in 1960, and receiving a special mention in a 1968 exhibition organised by UNESCO. Years later he took a further degree, in lithography, at the University of Salzburg in Austria.

In 1975, Daryabeigi joined a group of artists who called themselves "Independent Artists Group". The group developed the foundation that would define techniques and styles to be practiced in Iranian art for future generations to come. The group consisted of Marcos Grigorian, Morteza Momayez, Ḡolām-Ḥosayn Nāmi, Massoud Arabshahi, Faramarz Pilaram, and Sirāk Malkoniān. The group held several significant exhibitions for the next four years, including Ābi (Blue) and Gonj o gostareh (Volume and environment).

In 1979, Daryabeigi moved to Paris, then in 1986, moved to Nogent-sur-Marne on the outskirts of Paris. He continued to live and create art in France until his death in 2012. Daryabiegi had many solo exhibitions, and also exhibited his art at celebrated and respected international galleries

== Artistic style ==
The bare canvases he exhibited in the Salon d'Automne in Paris in 1973 show the vast spaces of his native Iran, and the beauty of the infinite landscapes.

In 2012, he exhibited in the Maison Nationale almost abstract cold, pale landscapes.

== Galleries ==
In 1962, Daryabeigi opened his first gallery, in Tehran. He named the gallery MESS, the Persian word for copper. This was one of the first independent art galleries in Iran to deal specifically with visual and graphic art. Alongside his own work, which was kept on permanent display, Daryabeigi regularly presented the work of other Iranian painters from a variety of different artistic backgrounds. By introducing these artists to the public, the MESS Gallery, under Mr. Daryabeigi's leadership, was considered as representing the country's contemporary art at the time, and encouraged the next generation of abstract Iranian painters.

He opened his first gallery in France in Nogent-sur-Marne in 1986.

== External links displaying Daryabeigi's art ==
- The Iranian: Kavir
- The Iranian: Desert
- Tehran Auction: (untitled)
- Tehran Museum of Contemporary Art The Iranian: Desert
