= Marcos Grigorian =

Iranian-Armenian artist (1925–2007)

- Մարկոս Գրիգորեան مارکو گريگوريان
- Born: 5 December 1925; Kropotkin, Krasnodar Krai, Russia
- Died: 27 August 2007 (aged 81); Yerevan, Armenia
- Other names: Marc Gregory, Marco Grigorian
- Education: Accademia di Belle Arti di Roma
- Occupations: artist, gallerist
- Spouse: Flora Adamian (m. 1955–1960; divorce)
- Children: Sabrina Grigorian

Marcos Grigorian, also known as Marco Grigorian (Armenian: Մարկոս Գրիգորեան; Persian: مارکو گريگوريان; 5 December 1925 – 27 August 2007) was an Iranian-Armenian and American artist and gallery owner, and he was a pioneer of Iranian modern art.

== Early life and education ==
Grigorian was born in 1925 in Kropotkin, Krasnodar Krai, Russia, to an Armenian family from Kars who had fled that city to escape massacres when it was captured by Turkey in 1920. In the same year Marcos Grigorian was born, his mother died of appendicitis, so his father moves the family to Iran, in Tehran.

After finishing his primary education in Iran, in 1950 he studied at the Accademia di Belle Arti in Rome. Graduating from there in 1954, he returned to Iran, opened the Galerie Esthétique, an important commercial gallery in Tehran.

In 1958, under the auspices of the Ministry of Culture, he organized the first Tehran Biennial. Grigorian was also an influential teacher at the Fine Arts Academy, where he disseminated his enthusiasm for local popular culture, including coffee-house paintings, a type of folk art named after the locations in which they were often displayed.

Around 1960 he started acting in a few Iranian films, under the name "Gregory Mark" or "Mark Gregory" (Persian: گریگوری مارک).

== Career ==
He lived in the 1960s in the United States; first moving in 1962 to New York City, and then moved to Minneapolis to work at Minnetonka Center for the Arts. In Minneapolis he started Universal Galleries which became an influential center for Iranian art in Minneapolis, and it existed at the same time along with a quickly growing Modern Iranian art collection that could be found at Abby Weed Grey's home. In 1975, Grey donated her collection to form New York University's art museum, the Grey Art Museum.

In 1975, Grigorian helped organize the Independent Artists Group (aka Group of Independent Painters and Sculptors) in Tehran and was a founding member. Other founding artists included Gholamhossein Nami, Massoud Arabshahi, Morteza Momayez, Mir Abdolrez Daryabeigi, and Faramarz Pilaram.

His series, Earthworks, was on canvas and it used a mixture of clay and straw called "kahgel", which is commonly found as a building material in villages in Iran. Grigorian's use of earth and straw differed from a painted imitation of those materials: he attached them directly to the canvas. The Metropolitan Museum of Art relates this approach to his interest in the textures of Iranian village buildings and desert landscapes. Works from this group in the museum's collection include an Untitled composition from the 1970s and Midsummer Night #10 (1991). He exhibited his clay and straw works in Yerevan in 1991. Grigorian was also an early artist with land art in Iran.

Grigorian eventually moved to Yerevan, Armenia (which was then still a republic of the Soviet Union). In 1989, he traveled to Russia at the invitation of the Union of Russian Artists, visiting Moscow and Leningrad.

He later donated 5,000 of his artworks to the government of Armenia. In 1993, he founded the "Museum of the Middle East" in Yerevan with 2,600 works on display, with most of them coming from his own collection. His work is included in various museum collections, including at the Museum of Modern Art (MOMA) in New York City; Metropolitan Museum of Art in New York City; Tehran Museum of Contemporary Art; Museum of Contemporary Art in Kerman; the Near East Art Museum in Yerevan; and the National Gallery of Armenia.

== Death ==
On 5 August 2007, Grigorian was assaulted and was beaten in the head by two masked robbers who had broken into his Yerevan home. It was speculated that the robbers believed, erroneously, that there was a large sum of money in the house, proceeds from the sale of Grigorian's summer residence in Garni. After an anonymous phone call to police, Grigorian was discovered injured and taken to hospital. He died of a suspected heart attack on 27 August 2007, a day after leaving the hospital.

== Personal life ==
Marcos was married in 1955 to Flora Adamian, but the marriage ended in divorce by 1960. Marcos and Flora's daughter, Sabrina Grigorian (1956–1986), was an actress.

== See also ==
- Iranian modern and contemporary art
