= Mansoor Ghandriz =

Iranian Modernist painter (1936–1966)

- منصور قندریز
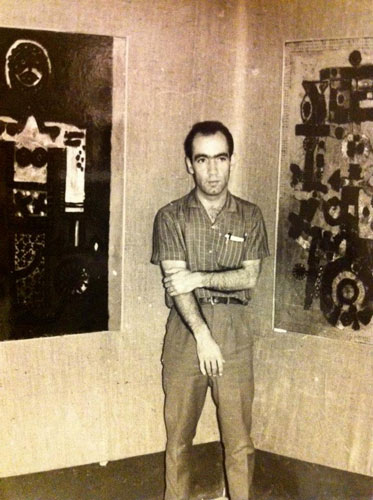
- Born: 2 March 1936; Tabriz, Imperial State of Iran
- Died: 26 February 1966 (aged 29); Esfand, Gilan, Imperial State of Iran
- Other names: Mansur Qandriz, Mansour Ghandriz
- Education: Tehran Fine Arts Academy, Tehran University
- Occupation: Visual artist
- Known for: Painting, printmaking
- Movement: Saqqakhaneh movement

Mansoor Ghandriz (Persian: منصور قندریز; 2 March 1936 – 26 February 1966) was an Iranian painter and printmaker. He used Iranian forms in modern art and was one of the pioneers of the Saqqakhaneh movement. Ghandriz is best known for his abstract paintings of mythical creatures.

== Biography ==
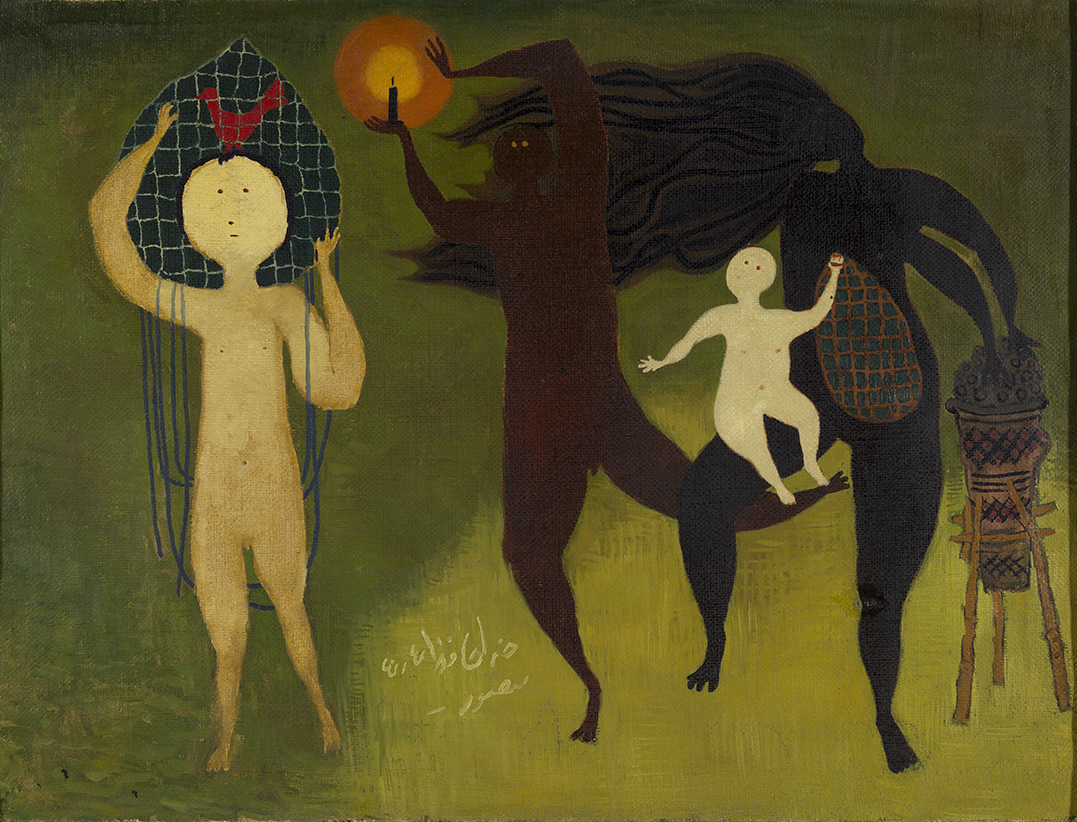
"Goodbye" painting by Mansoor Ghandriz from Tehran Museum of Contemporary Art

Mansoor Ghandriz was born on 2 March 1936 in Tabriz, Pahlavi Iran. While still in high school, Ghandriz was drawn to the progressive realist paintings of Ilya Repin (1844–1930) and Russian-Armenian seascape artist Ivan Aivazovsky (1817–1900).

Starting in 1954 he attended Jalil Ziapour's Tehran School of Decorative Arts (Persian: Honarestān-e honarhā-ye zibā); followed by study at the College of Decorative Arts at Tehran University (now University of Tehran). He had studied painting under Shokouh Riazi at the College of Decorative Arts. While in college, he was introduced to European modernism, and he delved into the tradition of Russian realists and European classical and figurative art.

After college he turned to a paradigmatic exhortation of modernist language within local Iranian narrative, and developing his own semi-abstract style. Incorporating the figurative techniques of old masters, he created his own corporeal abstraction, which also indicates a process of gradual formalization, progressing from free forms to order. Matisse, Picasso, and Persian miniature paintings inspired Ghandriz's early figurative work. Persian metalwork and Persian textiles inspired is later work.

Ghandriz played a pivotal role in the establishing the Iran Gallery (Persian: Talar-e Iran), founded in 1964 by Ghandriz, Ruyin Pakbaz, Faramarz Pilaram, Sadegh Tabrizi, Mohammad-Reza Jodat, Ghobad Shiva, Massoud Arabshahi, Sirus Malek, Farshid Mesghali, Parviz Mahallati, Morteza Momayez, and Hadi Hezareiy.

== Death and legacy ==
Ghandriz died on 26 February 1966 in a traffic accident in northern Iran, near Esfand, Gilan province.

After his death in 1966, the Iran Gallery was renamed Ghandriz Gallery (Persian: Talar-e Ghandriz) in his honor; and it remained open until the summer of 1978 during the Iranian Revolution. In 2016, his work "Untitled" sold for US $250,000.
