= Ruyin Pakbaz =

- رویین پاکباز
- Born: 1939 (age 86–87)
- Education: University of Tehran; Paris 1 Panthéon-Sorbonne University
- Known for: Encyclopedia of Art; Iranian Painting: From Ancient Times to the Present; co-founding Talar-e Iran
- Spouse: Parvaneh Etemadi

Ruyin Pakbaz (Persian: روئین پاکباز; born 1939), also transliterated as Ru'in Pakbaz, is an Iranian art historian, critic, writer, educator and modernist painter. He has written extensively on the history of Iranian and Western art and has been associated with the development of art-history teaching in Iran since the early 1970s.

Pakbaz is the author of the multi-volume Encyclopedia of Art (Persian: دایرة‌المعارف هنر), one of the principal Persian-language reference works on the visual arts, and Iranian Painting: From Ancient Times to the Present. His writings on Iranian modernism have also been cited in international scholarship on modern and contemporary Iranian art.

== Education and teaching ==
Pakbaz studied painting at the Faculty of Fine Arts of the University of Tehran between 1962 and 1969. He later studied aesthetics at the University of Paris I, receiving a master's degree in the subject.

He taught at the faculty of fine arts at the University of Tehran from 1970 to 1987 and later taught at Alzahra University and Islamic Azad University. He also conducted independent art-history classes from the early 1990s onward.

The Iran Book and Literature House has described Pakbaz as one of the figures involved in establishing and developing the academic study and teaching of art history in Iran. His teaching, writing and translations introduced generations of Iranian art students to the history, terminology and theoretical frameworks of both Iranian and Western art.

== Talar-e Iran and Talar-e Qandriz ==
While still active primarily as a painter, Pakbaz was among the founders of Talar-e Iran (Iran Hall) in Tehran in June 1964. The independent gallery was established by a group of young artists that included Morteza Momayez, Mansur Qandriz, Faramarz Pilaram, Massoud Arabshahi, Sadegh Tabrizi, Ghobad Shiva, Farshid Mesghali, Mohammad Reza Jodat, Sirous Malek and Hadi Hazavei.

After Qandriz's death in 1965, Talar-e Iran was renamed Talar-e Qandriz (Qandriz Hall). Pakbaz, Qandriz and Jodat were among the members who remained most closely involved with the institution during its early development. The gallery subsequently developed into an independent art centre that organised exhibitions, discussions, educational programmes and publications on painting, sculpture, graphic design and architecture.

Talar-e Qandriz sought to provide an alternative to both official cultural institutions and the commercial gallery system. Members of the group examined modern Western art alongside Iranian visual traditions and debated the relationship between contemporary artistic practice and Iranian society.

Pakbaz later documented the history of the institution in writings on Talar-e Iran and in the book Talar-e Qandriz: An Experience in the Social Presentation of Art, prepared with Hassan Mourizi-Nejad.

== Art criticism and historiography ==
From the 1960s onward, Pakbaz increasingly concentrated on art criticism, art history and research rather than on his own painting. His early writings addressed the development of modern Iranian painting and the problems involved in the adoption of European modernism in Iran.

In his 1974 study of contemporary Iranian painting and sculpture, Pakbaz argued that the encounter between Iranian art and Western artistic methods had a longer history than twentieth-century modernism, but distinguished post-Second World War Iranian modern art by its more radical break with earlier artistic structures. His interpretation has subsequently been discussed in scholarship on the historiography and cultural politics of Iranian modernism.

Pakbaz's scholarship covers both historical Persian art and twentieth-century Iranian art. His writings have examined subjects including Kamal-ol-molk, the Saqqakhaneh movement, Iranian modernist painting, contemporary Iraqi art, the development of modern art institutions in Iran and the relationship between modernism and Iranian visual traditions.

He has also written essays, catalogue texts and monographs on individual Iranian artists and contributed to the documentation of modern Iranian art.

== Encyclopedia of Art ==
Pakbaz's best-known reference work is the Encyclopedia of Art. The first one-volume edition was published in 1999 by Farhang-e Moaser (Contemporary Culture Publications). An expanded three-volume edition was subsequently prepared and published in 2016.

The expanded edition contains thousands of entries covering artists, movements, schools, techniques and terminology relating to painting, sculpture, graphic design, photography, new media, illustration, printmaking and caricature. It also contains material on calligraphy, ceramics, architecture and other visual and applied arts.

The third volume includes sections devoted to the historical development of art in different societies and to recurring subjects and iconography in visual art. A substantial part of the encyclopedia is devoted to Iranian art and to establishing Persian terminology for concepts originating in European art history.

The three-volume edition was selected as the outstanding work in the general arts category at the 35th Iran Book of the Year Awards in 2018.

== Writing on Iranian painting ==
Pakbaz's Iranian Painting: From Ancient Times to the Present (Persian: نقاشی ایران از دیرباز تا امروز) traces the history of painting and pictorial traditions in Iran from antiquity through the Islamic period to modern and contemporary art. It has been widely used as a Persian-language reference work in Iranian art education.

His later publications include In Search of a New Language, a study of the transformation of modern Iranian painting; Visual Art in Iran; writings on the history of Talar-e Qandriz; and a multi-volume series on pioneers of Iranian modern art.

== International publications ==
Pakbaz has also contributed to English-language publications on Iranian art. With curator Rose Issa and philosopher Daryush Shayegan, he contributed to the book Iranian Contemporary Art, published in London by Booth-Clibborn Editions in 2001 in connection with an exhibition at the Barbican Art Gallery.

His essays and books have been cited in subsequent scholarship on modern Iranian art, including studies of the Saqqakhaneh movement and the historiography of Iranian modernism.

== Painting ==
Before concentrating primarily on research and writing, Pakbaz was active as a modernist painter. He participated in exhibitions in Tehran during the 1960s and exhibited through Talar-e Iran and Talar-e Qandriz. His paintings from this period often employed geometric and abstract forms and an analytical approach to pictorial structure.

Works by Pakbaz have subsequently appeared in exhibitions examining the history of Talar-e Qandriz and Iranian modernism.

== Recognition ==
In addition to receiving the Iran Book of the Year Award for the expanded Encyclopedia of Art, Pakbaz was honoured for authorship in the Visual Arts Contributors section of the 17th Fajr Visual Arts Festival in 2025.

== Selected publications ==
- Pakbaz, Ruyin. Contemporary Iranian Painting and Sculpture. Tehran: Center for Research and Cultural Coordination, 1974.
- Pakbaz, Ruyin. Iranian Painting: From Ancient Times to the Present. Tehran. (in Persian)
- Pakbaz, Ruyin. Encyclopedia of Art. Tehran: Farhang-e Moaser, first published 1999; expanded three-volume edition, 2016. (in Persian)
- Issa, Rose; Pakbaz, Ruyin; Shayegan, Daryush. Iranian Contemporary Art. London: Booth-Clibborn Editions, 2001. ISBN 9781861542069.
- Pakbaz, Ruyin. In Search of a New Language: An Analysis of the Development of Painting in the Modern Era. (in Persian)
- Pakbaz, Ruyin; Mourizi-Nejad, Hassan. Talar-e Qandriz: An Experience in the Social Presentation of Art. Tehran. (in Persian)
- Pakbaz, Ruyin. Visual Art in Iran. Tehran. (in Persian)

== See also ==
- Iranian modern and contemporary art
- Saqqakhaneh movement
