= Near East Art Museum =

Art museum in Yerevan, Armenia

- Միջին Արևելքի արվեստի թանգարան
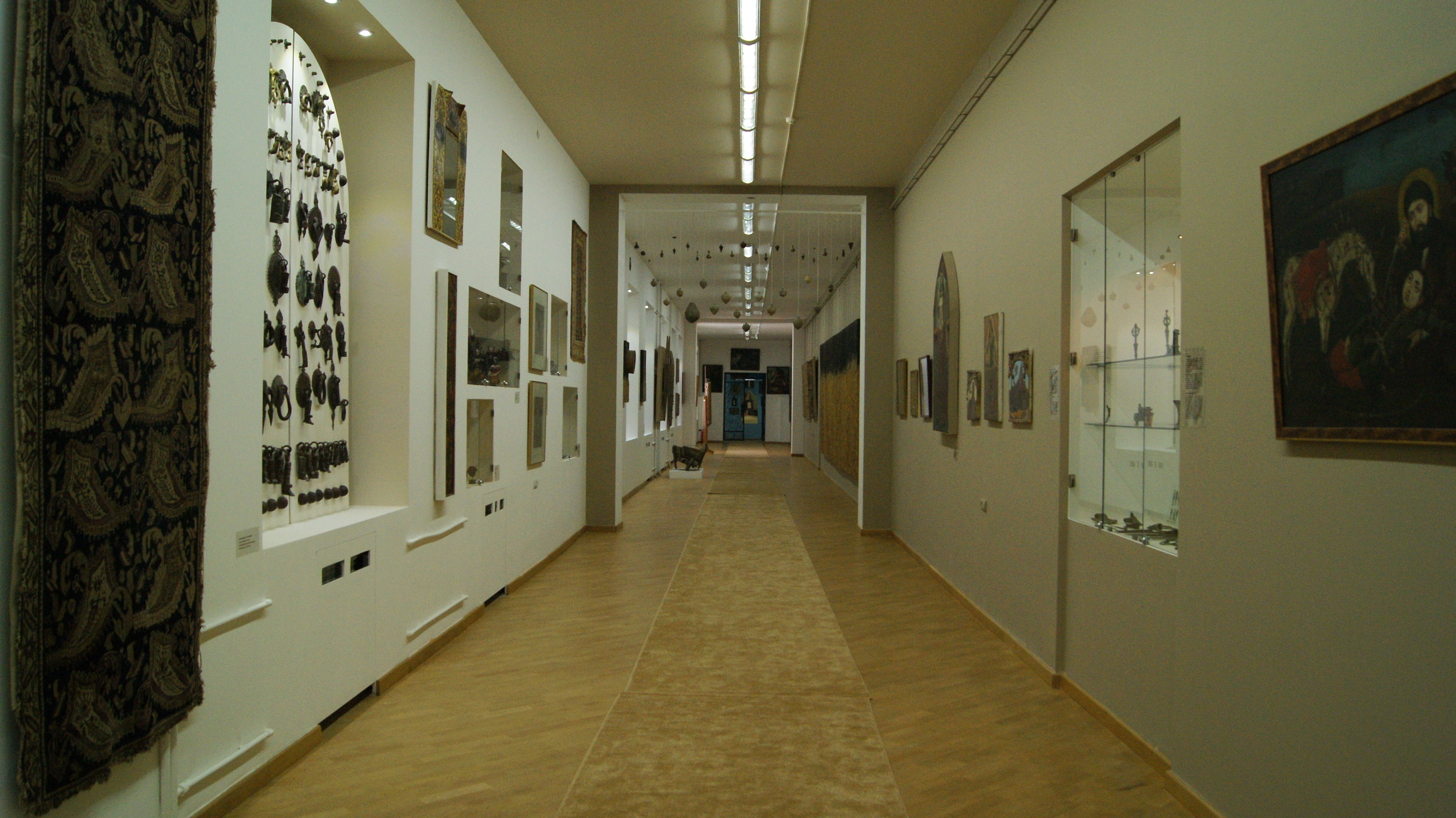
- Established: 1993
- Location: 1 Aram Str., Yerevan, Armenia
- Director: Zara Mokatsyan

Near East Art Museum is a museum of art located in Yerevan, Armenia. The museum was opened in 1993 and is based on a collection donated by Marcos Grigorian, painter, collector and honorary citizen of Yerevan in memory of his daughter, actress Sabrina Grigorian. The museum shares the building with Yerevan Museum of Literature and Culture.

The museum houses about 2,600 exhibits, including works by Marcos Grigorian and examples of Russian, European and Middle Eastern applied arts - Iranian faucets of the 12th-19th centuries, doorknockers, keys, locks, nails, Iranian-Turkmen silver ornaments of the 18th-19th centuries, 3 or 4,000-year-old bronze items, etc. The exhibits are housed in three halls.
