= Faramarz Pilaram =

Iranian modern artist (1937–1983)

- فرامرز پیلارام
- Born: 10 April 1937; Tehran, Imperial State of Iran
- Died: September 1983 (or 1982); Mahmudabad, Iran
- Burial place: Behesht-e Zahra
- Education: School of Decorative Arts for Boys, University of Tehran
- Occupations: Artists, professor
- Known for: Painting
- Spouse: Homa Darrati (married 1974–?)
- Children: 3

Faramarz Pilaram (Persian: فرامرز پیلارام; 1937–1983, or 1982) was an Iranian painter and educator. He is known for his abstract, and calligraphy-based modern paintings. Pilaram was a pioneer within the Saqqakhaneh school, a neo-traditionalist art movement. There were three major periods in his artistic career: figurative, decorative and calligraphic.

== Early life and education ==
Faramarz Pilaram was born on 10 April 1937, in Tehran, Pahlavi Iran. Pilaram attended Jalil Ziapour's School of Decorative Arts for Boys (Persian: Honarestān-e honarhā-ye zibā-ye pesarān) in Tehran, where he studied under Mahmoud Farshchian; and graduated in 1959.

He attended the Faculty of Decorative Arts (Persian: Dāneškada-e honarhā-ye tazʾini) at Tehran University (now University of Tehran), where he graduated in 1965. In 1968, Pilaram received his master’s degree in painting and interior design from the Faculty of Decorative Arts; where he studied under Shokouh Riazi.

In 1974, Pilaram married his cousin Homa Darrati and had three children.

== Career ==
Pilaram was among the first group of Iranian artists focused on Iranian heritage and mythical motifs in their artwork, which makes him one of the founders of the Saqqakhaneh art movement. Other leading members of the movement including Massoud Arabshahi, Mohammad Ehsai, Parviz Tanavoli, and Hossein Zenderoudi.

Pilaram played a pivotal role in the establishment of Iran Gallery (Tālār-e Iran, later Talar-e Ghandriz) in Tehran, founded in 1964 by Pilaram, Mansoor Ghandriz, Ruyin Pakbaz, Sadegh Tabrizi, Mohammad-Reza Jodat, Ghobad Shiva, Massoud Arabshahi, Sirus Malek, Farshid Mesghali, Parviz Mahallati, Morteza Momayez, and Hadi Hezareiy.

He was a founding member of the Independent Artists Group in Tehran, led by Marcos Grigorian.

Pilaram participated in the third and fourth Tehran Biennial. From 1972 to 1980, he taught design classes in the Faculty of Architecture at Iran University of Science and Technology.

== Death and legacy ==
In 1983, he died of a heart attack in Mahmudabad, Mazandaran province. Some sources state the date of death as 1982, possibly due to calendar conversation issues. Pilaram was buried in the Behesht-e Zahra cemetery in Tehran.

His artwork is in museum collections, including at the Museum of Modern Art, Metropolitan Museum of Art, Tehran Museum of Contemporary Art, and the Grey Art Gallery at NYU.

In 2006, Pilaram had a posthumous retrospective exhibition at Gallery 66 in Tehran.

== See also ==
- Calligraffiti
- Iranian modern and contemporary art
