= Cesar Concio =

Philippine architect

- Born: Philippines
- Education: University of the Philippines; Mapua Institute of Technology; Massachusetts Institute of Technology
- Occupation: Architect

Cesar Homero Rosales Concio Sr. (1907 – 2003) was an architect who as the first University Architect of the University of the Philippines designed many buildings in the University of the Philippines Diliman campus. He was also one of the architects who created the Makati Central Business District. Concio's architecture has been described in the Encyclopedia of Art as “a rational approach to design, resulting in logically arranged spaces, neatness of form, and a successful adaptation to climate".

== Education ==
Cesar Concio graduated with the degree of Bachelor of Science in Civil Engineering at the University of the Philippines in 1928. He was a member of Upsilon Sigma Phi. He then took up architecture at the Mapua Institute of Technology in 1932. In 1933, Concio ranked first in the government examination for architects. Later on, he finished his Masters in Town Planning and Housing at the Massachusetts Institute of Technology in 1940.

== Career ==
Upon returning to the Philippines, Cesar Concio started working at the Department of Public Works from 1940 to 1945, while teaching at Mapua Institute of Technology. After the war in 1945, he became the first vice president of the re-organized Philippine Architect's Society. By 1946, he headed the Department of Architecture of Mapua, and became its first Dean. In 1948, the Capital City Planning Commission was created, and Concio was appointed executive secretary. He also became the sixth President of the Philippine Institute of Architects (PIA). He was also a founding member of the Philippine Institute of Environmental Planners, where he headed the Committee on the Constitution and By-Law.

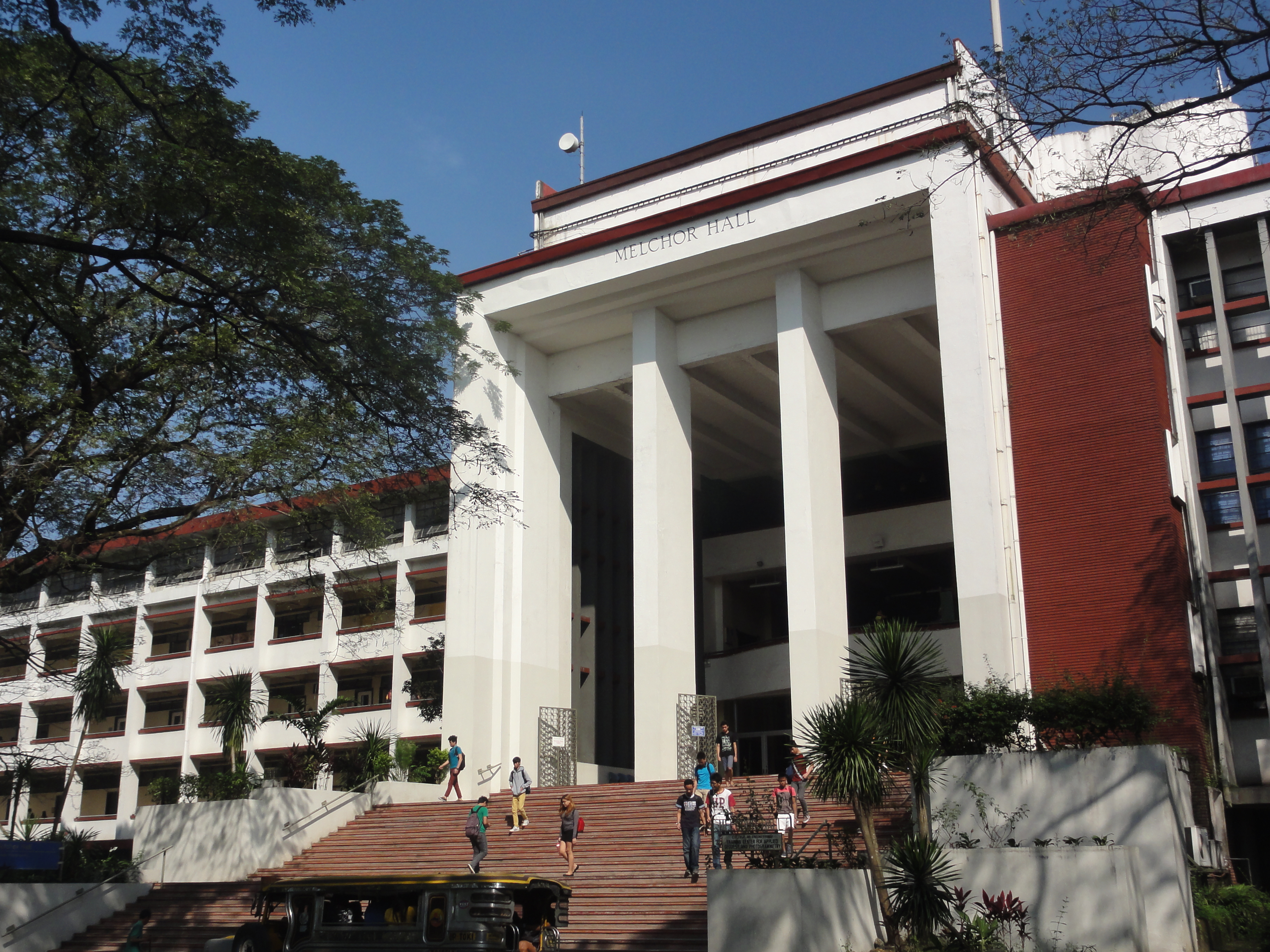
Melchor Hall.

He was the first University Architect of the University of the Philippines, during which the University transferred to Diliman from Padre Faura in the late 1940. He was also a member of the University Building Committee. His plan for the grounds of Diliman was patterned after the University of Virginia. His sketches for Palma Hall (commonly known as “AS”) and Melchor Hall enlarged on the original American-designed Benitez and Delaney halls to provide a symmetrical look to the campus. Likewise, his idea for Quezon Hall served as crown to the university oval.

The former headquarters of Insular Life in Makati.

He was one of the architects selected by President Manuel Roxas in 1947 to study the trends in Architecture and Engineering to design the buildings of the Capital City (then Quezon City), especially in his position as the Chief Architect of the UP Diliman Campus. This mission enabled him to meet the architect of Brasilia's buildings, Oscar Niemeyer.

In 1964, he was the recipient of the Gold Medal of Merit awarded by PIA. In 1969, Concio was given the Patnubay ng Sining at Kalinangan by the City of Manila.

=== Buildings designed ===
- Palma Hall, UP Diliman – main building of the University of the Philippines College of Social Sciences and Philosophy
- Melchor Hall, UP Diliman – main building of the University of the Philippines College of Engineering
- Wenceslao Vinzons Hall, UP Diliman – campus student center
- Faustino T. Orillo Hall (International House), UP Los Baños – former office building of the UPLB Graduate School
- Molave Residence Hall, UP Diliman
- Church of the Risen Lord, UP Diliman
- Insular Life Building, Makati
- Baclaran Church, Parañaque
- Lungsod ng Kabataan / Philippine Children's Medical Center
- Ramona Apartments, Manila

== Death ==
Arch. Cesar died in 2003 in Manila, Philippines due to a lingering illness.
