= Independent Artists Group =

Iranian art group (1974–1977)

- گروه هنرمندان آزاد
- Nickname: Independent Group of Painters and Sculptors; Independent Group; Free Group
- Formation: October 1974
- Dissolved: 1977

Independent Artists Group (Persian: گروه هنرمندان آزاد, romanized: Goruh-e Honarmandan-e Azad) was an Iranian art group, active from October 1974 until 1977. It consisted of seven artist, including Marcos Grigorian, Gholamhossein Nami, Massoud Arabshahi, Morteza Momayez, Faramarz Pilaram, Sirak Melkonian, and Mir Abdolreza Daryabeigi. The group held four exhibitions in Tehran, and participated in three major art events such as the Art Basel in 1976 and 1977, and WashArt 77 Art Fair in Washington, D.C. The group's activities were seen to be reflective of modernist and conceptual art. It is also known as the Independent Group of Painters and Sculptors, the Free Group, or shortened to the Independent Group.

== History ==
According to Gholamhossein Nami, "Marcos Grigorian proposed the initial idea for the group's formation, with Morteza Momayez and Nami being the first members to join. It consisted of seven artist, including Marcos Grigorian, Gholamhossein Nami, Massoud Arabshahi, Morteza Momayez, Faramarz Pilaram, Sirak Melkonian, and Mir Abdolreza Daryabeigi. These seven artists decided to take a response to the copying of artworks in the name of modern art, therefore by developing a bylaw and setting goals, they decided to present the newest aspects of modernism in the world in a principled manner.

The group disbanded in 1977. Shortly after the Iranian Revolution in 1979, social and political transformations shifted the general direction of art in Iran and contemporary art was unable to further develop into a flourishing, nationwide movement.
