= Simin Ekrami =

Iranian artist

- سیمین اکرامی
- Born: 1948 (age 77–78); Tehran, Iran
- Education: Morgan State University; University of Tehran
- Known for: Sculpture
- Movement: Modern and contemporary Iranian art
- Spouse: Bahram Dabiri

Simin Ekrami (Persian: سیمین اکرامی; born 1948) is an Iranian sculptor whose work includes stone, bronze, wood and plaster sculpture, reliefs and public monuments. Her sculptures frequently draw on natural and organic forms, the human figure and historical representations of geography.

Ekrami studied sculpture in the United States before completing her studies at the Faculty of Fine Arts of the University of Tehran, where she worked primarily under Parviz Tanavoli. Her public works include sculptures in Jamshidieh Park, the grounds of the Iranian Artists Forum and Goft-o-goo Park in Tehran.

== Early life and education ==
Ekrami was born in Tehran in 1948. Before leaving Iran, she attended painting classes, including classes associated with painter and sculptor Jazeh Tabatabai.

In 1968 she moved to the United States and studied sculpture for three years at Morgan State University in Baltimore, Maryland. She returned to Iran in 1971 and continued her studies at the Faculty of Fine Arts of the University of Tehran. There she studied mainly with sculptor Parviz Tanavoli and received her degree in 1974.

While studying at the University of Tehran she met painter Bahram Dabiri, whom she later married. The two artists subsequently shared a studio.

== Career ==
After completing her studies, Ekrami initially worked with found wood, clay and plaster. She later suspended her professional practice for several years while raising her children and resumed working full-time as a sculptor in 1987.

Her practice subsequently expanded to include wood, plaster, stone and bronze. Large-scale stone carving became a significant part of her public work, while other sculptures employed bronze and mixed materials.

Ekrami has also served on selection and jury panels for public sculpture projects. In 2013, she was one of seven sculptors appointed to judge a Tehran Municipality competition for urban sculpture, which received 260 proposals from 144 artists.

== Work ==
Ekrami's sculpture frequently begins with the physical characteristics of the material itself. In her stone works she has often retained existing geological forms rather than imposing a completely predetermined shape on the material.

Her practice has been described in surveys of contemporary Iranian sculpture as combining an emotional treatment of the figure with disciplined attention to volume and material.

=== Historical maps ===
A recurring strand in Ekrami's work is the transformation of historical Persian maps and geographical diagrams into three-dimensional forms. She became interested in early Iranian geographical drawings while researching visual representations of the mathematician Muhammad ibn Musa al-Khwarizmi. The forms she encountered in historical manuscripts led her to create sculptures based on maps by Persian geographers and mathematicians.

Her best-known work in this group is The Earth, based on a representation of the world associated with Al-Biruni. A small bronze version, executed in 1990 in an edition of three, was later offered at Christie's in Dubai.

A larger version of The Earth was commissioned in 1993 by the Tehran Municipality's Renovation Office for the state pavilion at Mehrabad International Airport. Ekrami subsequently produced another version based on the same geographical source for Goft-o-goo Park in Tehran in 2004.

A bronze version of The Earth was also included in the second Tehran Auction in 2013.

== Public sculpture ==
Ekrami has completed a number of commissions for public spaces in Tehran and other Iranian cities.

In the 1990s she was commissioned to produce a sculptural model for the mechanized postal service in Shiraz and another work for Tehran's Urban Renewal Organization.

In 1994 she began work on four large volcanic stones selected for an extension of Jamshidieh Park in northern Tehran. Rather than replacing their existing forms, she carved the stones in response to shapes already produced by natural erosion.

Her other public projects include seven stone birds installed on the grounds of the Iranian Artists Forum and a version of The Earth at Goft-o-goo Park.

== Exhibitions ==
Ekrami has participated in solo and group exhibitions in Iran and abroad. Her works have appeared in exhibitions devoted to modern and contemporary Iranian sculpture as well as in commercial and institutional exhibitions.

In December 2018, Deilaman Gallery in Tehran opened its exhibition programme with a survey of Ekrami's sculptures titled Destruction. The exhibition was accompanied by the publication of a book on her life and work. ILNA described her at the time as a veteran sculptor with a history of international activity.

Her work was included in the 2023 exhibition A Selection of 70 Years of Iranian Sculpture, which surveyed several generations of Iranian sculptors.

== Art market ==
Ekrami's sculptures have appeared in Iranian and international auctions. In 2008, Christie's offered a bronze edition of The Earth, executed in 1990. Another version of the work appeared at Tehran Auction in 2013.

== Selected public works ==
- Model for the mechanized postal service, Shiraz, early 1990s
- Sculpture for Tehran's Urban Renewal Organization, 1990s
- The Earth, based on a map attributed to Al-Biruni, commissioned for the state pavilion at Mehrabad International Airport, 1993
- Four monumental stone sculptures, Jamshidieh Park, Tehran, begun 1994
- The Earth, Goft-o-goo Park, Tehran, 2004
- Seven stone birds, Iranian Artists Forum, Tehran, 2006

== See also ==
- Parviz Tanavoli
- Bahram Dabiri
- Iranian modern and contemporary art
