= Dabiri =

Dabiri is an Indian ethnic fashion brand. Dabiri may also refer to

- Dabiri (surname)
- Dabiri Tabriz FSC, an Iranian futsal club
