= Eddie Leonard =

American vaudevillian and actor (died 1941)

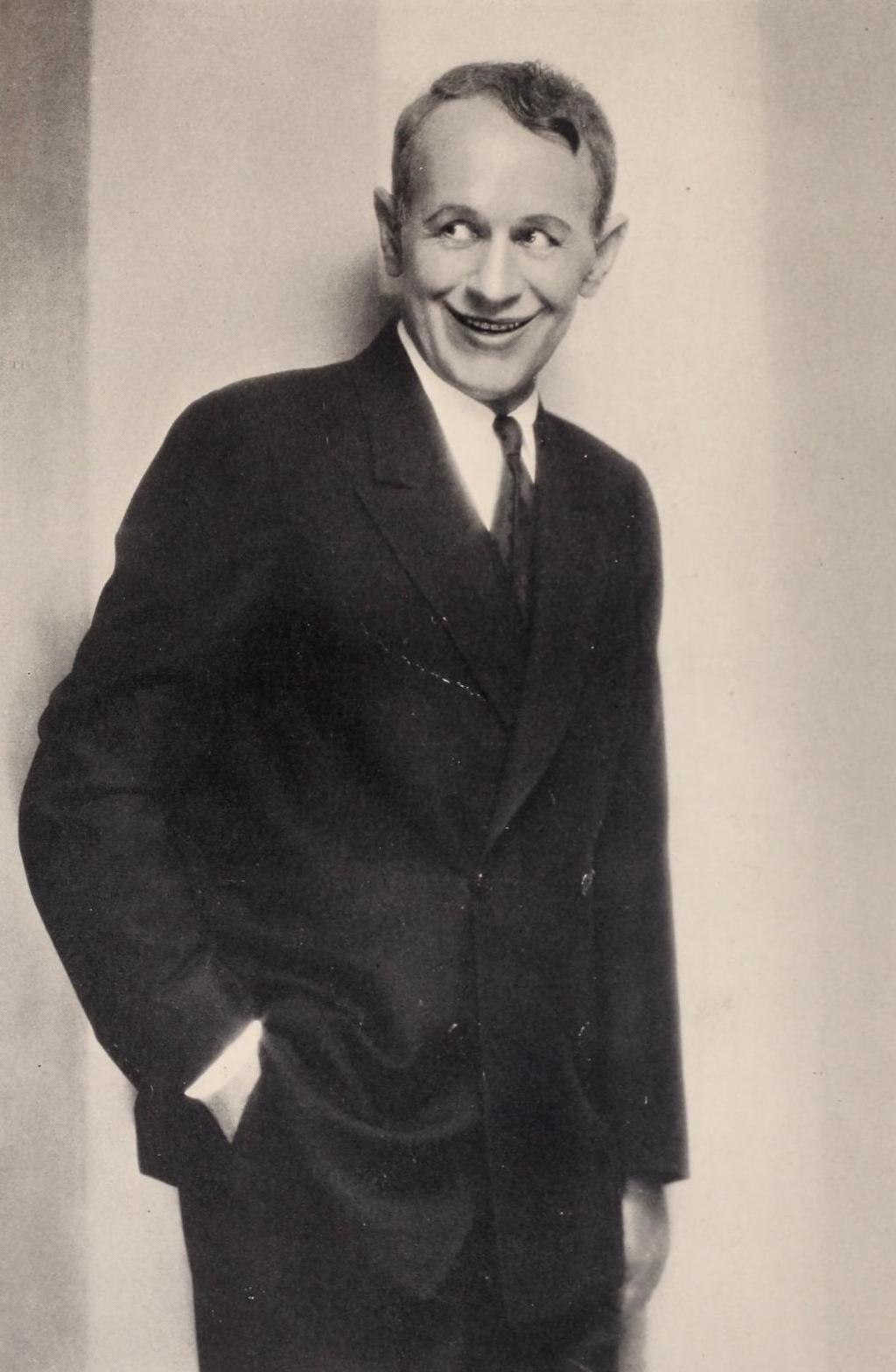
- Leonard (c. 1929)
- Born: Lemuel Gordon Toney; October 17, 1870; Richmond, Virginia, U.S.
- Died: July 28, 1941 (aged 70); New York City, U.S.
- Resting place: Cedar Grove Cemetery; Queens, New York, U.S.
- Occupation: Stage actor
- Spouse: Mabel Russell (m. 1908)

Eddie Leonard (October 17, 1870 – July 28, 1941), born Lemuel Gordon Toney, was a vaudevillian and a man considered the greatest American minstrel of his day, at a time when minstrel shows were an acceptable and popular mainstream entertainment in the United States. He was called "last of the great minstrels" in his 1941 obituary in Time. He performed in vaudeville for 45 years before that medium faded in the 1920s, and was known for such songs as "Ida, Sweet As Apple Cider" and "Roly Boly Eyes". He published his memoir titled What a Life I'm Telling You in 1934.

== Early life ==
Lemuel Gordon Toney was born in 1871 or on October 18, 1875, sources vary, in Church Hill, Richmond, Virginia, to Ellen and Richard Toney. As a boy, his family moved to South Richmond and Manchester. At the age of 12, he started his stage career at Putnam's Theatre Comique at East Franklin Street in Richmond. He then took up the stage name Eddie Leonard. He also worked as a water boy at Tredegar Iron Works in Belle Isle. He performed alongside Bill Robinson in Richmond.

== Career ==
Leonard wanted to be a baseball player, and tried out for John McGraw and played for the Baltimore Orioles as a center fielder briefly. He was unsuccessful, but danced and sang for the players in the clubhouse, and George H. Primrose discovered him. Primrose subsequently hired him as a minstrel. He subsequently performed with the George Primrose Minstrels.

In 1890, Leonard left Richmond with a road show. He would find his way to New York City, and was hired in the show McFadden's Flats'. Around 1900, Leonard joined Jack Haverly's minstrel show. In 1903, Leonard danced and sang the song "Don't Do Nothin' for Nobody That Won't Do Nothin' For You" with Primrose and Decker. He became known for a ragtime song style that Leonard called "syncopated syllabication" and a "soft shoe" dance. He was known for his songs "Ida, Sweet As Apple Cider", "Roly Boly Eyes" and "Big Brown Booloo Eyes", but he wrote more than 40 songs throughout his career. His song "Ida, Sweet As Apple Cider" sold 500,000 copies. He also appeared in the musical comedies, The Southerners and Lifting the Lid. His musical comedy Roly-Boly Eyes broke a house record in 1919 at the Knickerbocker Theatre in Manhattan. Leonard performed with his wife Mabel Russell in vaudeville acts. Leonard was in big minstrel shows, including Eddie Leonard's Minstrel Monarchs and the Cohan and Harris Show, which was backed by George M. Cohan. His salary in 1910 reached US$6,000 (equivalent to $207,321 in 2025) a week.

In 1932, Leonard was scheduled to tour with The Rooneys, Walter C. Kelly, Joe Frisco, Dannie Dare, Eddie Miller and George Price, but the tour was cancelled. In 1929, Eddie Leonard starred in the movie production Melody Lane and he appeared in several other movies.

Later in life, Leonard managed a bar and grill in Brooklyn called Eddie Leonard Minstrel Bar and Grill, but the business folded after six years.

== Personal life ==
Leonard married Mabel Russell, a vaudeville performer, in 1908. For a time, Leonard lived at the Imperial Hotel at Broadway and 31st Street in New York City.

At the time of his death, Leonard and his wife lived at King Edward Hotel at 120 West 44th Street in New York City. Leonard was found dead on July 29, 1941, at the Imperial Hotel. He was reported missing by his wife the evening prior, and is estimated to have died the same evening, July 28. Leonard was buried at Cedar Grove Cemetery in Queens, New York.

== Partial filmography ==
- Melody Lane (1929)
- The Minstrel Show (1929)
- Rainbow's End
- If I Had My Way (1940)
