= Sirak Melkonian =

Iranian-Armenian painter (1930–2024)

- سیراک ملکنیان
- Born: 15 October 1930; Tehran, Iran
- Died: 17 August 2024 (aged 93); Toronto, Canada
- Other name: Սիրակ Մելքոնյան
- Citizenship: Iranian, Canadian
- Occupation: Painter
- Style: Abstract Art
- Awards: Royal Prize of the Tehran Biennial, 1958
- Website: http://WWW.SIRAKMELKONIAN.COM

Sirak Melkonian (15 October 1930 – 17 August 2024; Persian: سیراک ملکنیان, Armenian: Սիրակ Մելքոնյան) was an Iranian-Armenian painter and one of the pioneers of modern art in Iran.

== Biography ==
Melkonian was born on 15 October 1930 in Tehran. Due to his father's occupation, the family moved to Arak and later returned to Tehran again. At the age of 12, with his father's support, Melkonian began learning oil painting under the tutelage of an Assyrian painter named Alex Gevargiz.

During his teenage years, during high school years, Melkonian became a member of the Progressive Armenian Cultural Association, where he pursued painting seriously for over a decade alongside other Armenian artists. He met Marcos Grigorian, through whom he was introduced to modern European and Western art. Melkonian's early works exhibited a figurative and expressionist approach. In 1957, he won the Contemporary Iranian Artists Award from the Iran-America Society, and in 1958, he received the Royal Prize at the Tehran Biennial. Encouraged by Grigorian, he traveled to Italy to further his education at the Accademia di Belle Arti di Roma. However, he left his formal studies incomplete and continued his artistic journey through self-directed learning. He participated in the Venice Biennale, and shortly thereafter, his works were exhibited at the Paris Biennale.

Over the years, Melkonian participated in numerous solo and group exhibitions both in Iran and internationally. In the years before the Iranian Revolution, during the 1970s, he won first place at the Tehran International Art Exhibition. His works were showcased in the third edition of the Independent Artists Group exhibition in 1975, at the WashArt 77 Art Fair, and the FIAC 77 Art Fair.

From 1972 to 1975, Melkonian, in addition to his professional activities as a painter and artist, also privately taught painting in Tehran. In 1981, he emigrated to Greece and about a year later moved to Canada, where he continued to live and work in Toronto.

Melkonian died on Saturday, 17 August 2024, at the age of 93 in Toronto.

== Style ==
Melkonian was one of the pioneers of figurative art in the 1950s (1330s in the Iranian calendar). Alongside a group of artists centered around Marcos Grigorian, he played a key role in shifting figurative painting in Iran—originally influenced by Impressionism—towards Expressionism. This group sought not only to transform the form and structure of painting but also to move beyond a romantic engagement with tradition and its mere depiction. Their critical and inquisitive perspective aimed at discovering their cultural roots within the surrounding society while confronting the modern world.

Melkonian exhibited some of his most important works from this period of artistic and intellectual development at the Tehran Biennial in 1958 (1337 in the Iranian calendar). Alongside his paintings, he also exhibited his engravings, earning the Royal Prize at the Biennial. Following this success, Melkonian was selected as one of Iran's representatives at the Venice and Paris Biennials.

In the early 1960s, Melkonian began a new phase in his artistic career by gravitating towards abstract art. With his abstract works, he became a representative of another significant movement in the history of Iranian Modern art.

In his abstract works, Melkonian was less concerned with color or the representation of nature and more focused on a deep and continuous exploration of nature itself. By using warm, harmonious colors, he revealed his keen attention to composition and the juxtaposition of geometric shapes derived from nature, along with the impactful element of line.

Except for a brief period in his youth, Melkonian seldom revisited human figuration. He was deeply fascinated by nature, but not in the familiar sense depicted by other modern artists of his generation. The nature represented in his works carries a more mystical and intuitive reflection of the earth, of its elements, and other transcendent concepts that guide the viewer towards an unknown and sacred realm. Although these works may initially evoke the textures of hills or the veins of stone, they continue to evolve in the pursuit of form and geometry. Melkonian's works are characterized by a robust, confident, and assured structure.

== Exhibitions ==
=== Solo exhibitions ===
Melkonian has had solo exhibitions in amongst other:

- Esthetic Gallery, Tehran, May 1957
- Esthetic Gallery, Tehran, November 1957, Introducing Linocut Prints for the 1st time in Iran
- Iran-India Culture Relation Society, Tehran, 1962
- Zervan Gallery, Tehran, 1973
- Odermatt Gallery, Paris, France, 1976
- Zand Gallery, Tehran, 1978
- Athens, Greece, 1981
- Arshile Gorky Gallery, New York, 1983
- PM Collection, Los Angeles, USA, 1986
- Studio Café, Newport, USA, 1987
- AMV Graphic Organization, Toronto, Canada, 1997
- Bay Side Gallery, USA, 2000
- Gorky Gallery, Toronto, Canada, 2004
- Mah Art Gallery, Tehran, 2006
- Retrospective: "Seven Decades of Sirak Melkonian's Paintings," Aria Gallery, Tehran, 2015
- Retrospective: "Seven Decades of Sirak Melkonian's Paintings," Ab Anbar Gallery, Tehran, 2015
- "An Odyssey from Sand to Snow", Sahar K Boluki Fine Art Gallery, Toronto, 2023

=== Group shows ===
Melkonian has been part of exhibitions, amongst other:

- "Annual Group Exhibition," Iran-Soviet Union Association, Tehran, 1950
- "Exhibition of Contemporary Iranian Artists," Abiaz Palace, Tehran, 1956
- "Exhibition of Contemporary Iranian Artists," Iran-America Society, Tehran, 1957
- "Venice Biennale" 1958
- "Paris Biennale" 1959
- "Exhibition of Contemporary Iranian Artists," Central Office of Bank Saderat, Tehran, 1961
- "Exhibition of Contemporary Iranian Artists," New York, 1967
- "Exhibition of Contemporary Iranian Artists," New York, 1967
- "Exhibition of Contemporary Iranian Artists," Pakistan, 1971
- "Exhibition of Contemporary Iranian Artists," West Germany, 1973
- "Independent Artists Group" Iran-France International Exhibition, Tehran, 1974
- "Exhibition of Contemporary Iranian Artists," Art and Culture Gallery, Tehran, 1974
- "Exhibition of Selected Works by Contemporary Artists," Seyhoun Gallery, 1974
- "Artworks by Iranian Artists from Past to Present," Iran-America Society, Tehran, 1975
- "Artworks by Iranian and International Artists," Saman Gallery, Tehran, 1976
- "FIAC 77 Contemporary Art Exhibition," Grand Palais, Paris, 1977
- "Contemporary Artists," Zand Gallery, Tehran, 1977
- "Collection of Artworks by Armenian-Canadian Artists," Montreal and Ottawa, 1990
- "Contemporary American Artists," Baghoomian Gallery, New York, 1995
- "Contemporary Armenian Artists, Arovast 97," Central Library, Los Angeles, USA, 1997
- "Nature in Contemporary Iranian Paintings," Tehran Museum of Contemporary Art, 1999
- "Contemporary Iranian Painters: East of Imagination," Tehran Museum of Contemporary Art, 2006
- "50th Anniversary: Exhibition of Works by 50+5 Contemporary Iranian Artists," Seyhoun Gallery, 2017
- "Iran Print," Meem Gallery, Dubai, 2019
- "Epic Iran," Victoria and Albert Museum, London, England, 2020
- "5 Titans of Modern Iranian Art," Sahar Balooki Gallery, Toronto, Canada, 2022
- "Several Seasons: Fereydoun Ave and La'l Collection," Art Jameel, Dubai, 2023

== Works in collections ==
- Tehran Museum of Contemporary Art
- Sa'dabad Palace
- Niavaran Palace
- Sepah Bank Collection
- Victoria & Albert Museum
- Los Angeles County Museum of Art

== Resources ==
www.sirakmelkonian.com

- "Prominent Figures Introduced in the Exhibition of Armenian Artists in Iran," Peyman Cultural Quarterly, Issue 64, 17th Year, Summer 2013 (1392).
- "Encyclopedia of Iranian Armenians," Author: Janet D. Lazarian, Hirmand Publishing, 2nd Edition, 2009 (1388). ISBN 978-964-6974-50-0
- "Sirak Melkonian, Independent Painter," Sanaz Aryanfar, Peyman Cultural Quarterly, Issue 98.
- "Sirak Melkonian, Explorer of Endless Horizons," Kianoush Mo'taghedi.
- "Sirak Melkonian in the Media," Aydin Aghdashloo.
- "Passing of Sirak Melkonian, One of the Seven Founders of 'The Free Painters and Sculptors Group' in Iran," Sepideh Gorgani.
- Navasargian, Alice. (1997). Iran – Armenia: Golden Bridges: 20th Century Iranian-Armenian Painters. Glendale: AAA Publishing House. pp. 142–145. ISBN 978-0-9697620-0-3
