= Melody Lane (1929 film) =

1929 film

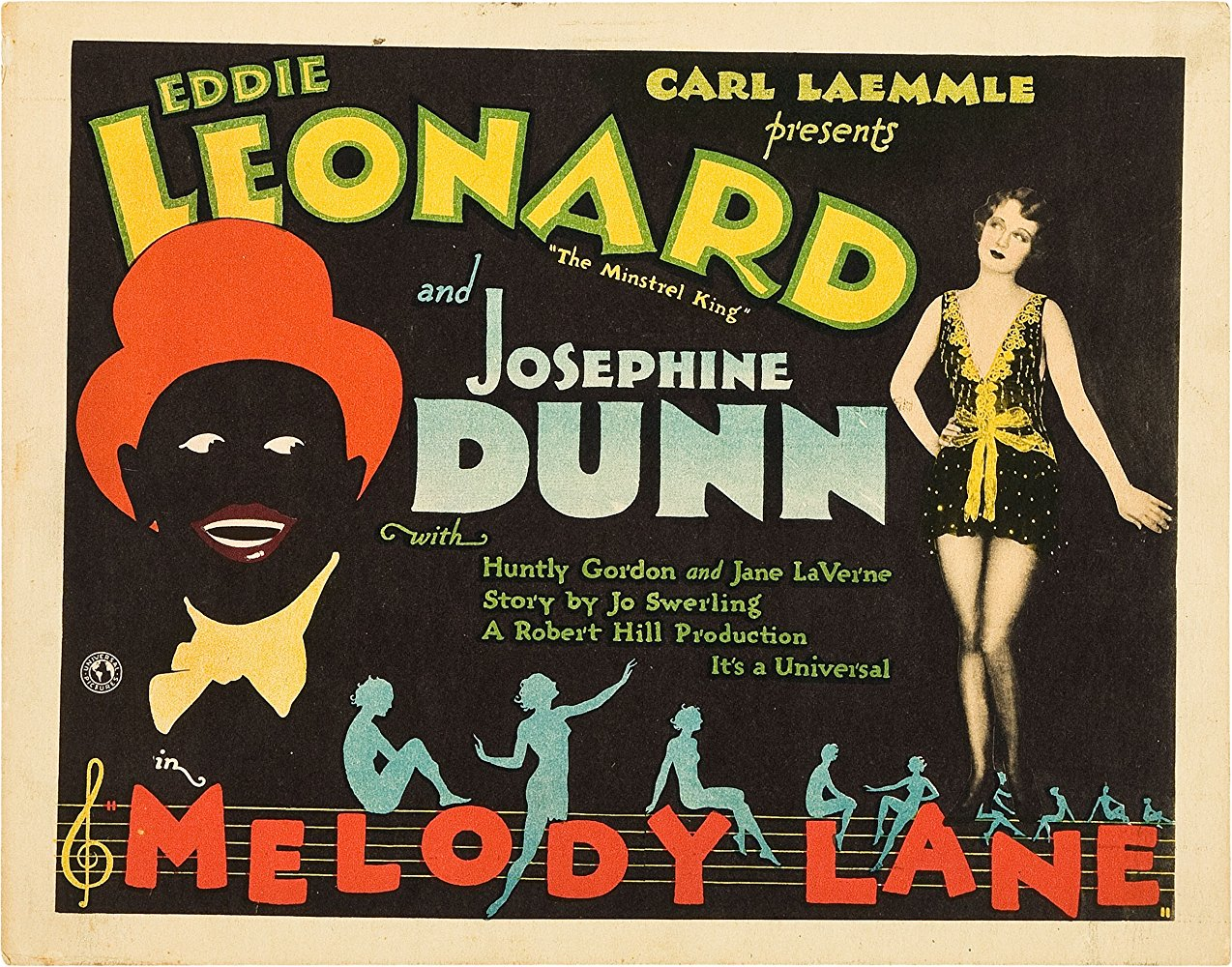
- Directed by: Robert F. Hill
- Written by: J.G. Hawks; Robert F. Hill; Tom Reed
- Based on: The Understander by Jo Swerling
- Starring: Eddie Leonard; Josephine Dunn; Rose Coe
- Cinematography: Joseph Brotherton
- Edited by: Daniel Mandell
- Distributed by: Universal Pictures
- Release date: July 21, 1929
- Running time: 76 minutes
- Country: United States
- Language: English
- Budget: $30,000

Melody Lane is a 1929 black and white American musical film directed by Robert F. Hill. It is an adaptation of the play The Understander written by Jo Swerling.

== Plot ==
This story follows a songwriter, Des Dupree, who joins the U.S Army in France, leaving behind his Chorus Girl Sweetheart. During his time in the Army, he falls in love with a French singer. Des is injured in action and his chorus girl eventually leaves him. His French singer can't seem to forget about him, so she follows him back to the states where the two are reunited and he is cured of his injury

== Cast ==
- Eddie Leonard as Des Dupree
- Josephine Dunn as Dolores Dupree
- Rose Coe as Constance Dupree
- George E. Stone as Danny
- Huntley Gordon as Rinaldi
- Jane La Verne as Constance Dupree
- Blanche Carter as Nurse
- Jake Kern as Orchestra Leader
- Monte Carter as Stage Manager

== Soundtrack ==
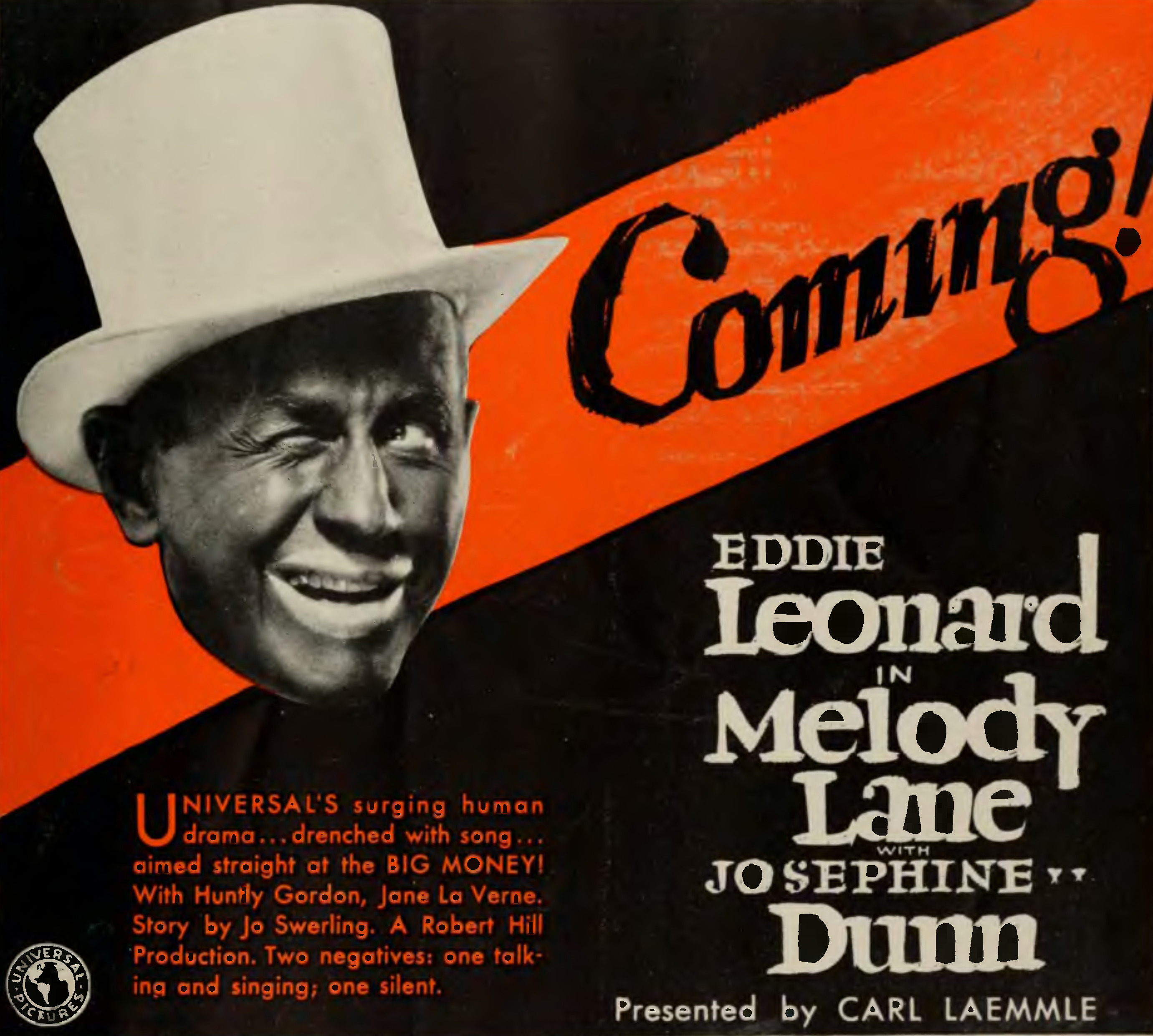
- Melody Lane ad in The Film Daily, 1929
  "ROLY BOLY EYES"

Written by Eddie Leonard
Performed by Eddie Leonard

- "THE SONG OF THE ISLANDS"

Written by Charles E. King

- "Here I Am"

Words and Music by Eddie Leonard, Grace Stern, and Jack Stern
Copyright 1929 by Irving Berlin Inc.

- "There's Sugar-Cane Around My Door"

Words and Music by Eddie Leonard, Grace Stern, and Jack Stern
Copyright 1929 by Irving Berlin Inc.

- "The Bogey-Man Is Here"

Words and Music by Eddie Leonard, Grace Stern, and Jack Stern
Copyright 1929 by Irving Berlin Inc.

- "Beautiful"

Words and Music by Eddie Leonard, Grace Stern, and Jack Stern
Copyright 1929 by Irving Berlin Inc.

== Production ==
The production company for this film includes Robert F. Hill as writer and director, Daniel Mandell as editor, and Joseph Brotherton as the cinematographer. Shot at Universal Studios in Universal City, California, the film was released on July 21, 1929 by Universal Pictures.

== Preservation ==
The film is now incomplete, with a 16mm copy of the last reel of the sound version, an incomplete print of the silent version (5 of the 6 reels) is also in the Library of Congress. An incomplete soundtrack (reels 1, 3, 5, 6, 7 and 8 of 8) also survives in the hands of a private collector.

== See also ==
- List of early sound feature films (1926–1929)
