= If I Had My Way (film) =

- Theatrical re-release poster, 1946
- Directed by: David Butler
- Written by: William M. Conselman; James V. Kern
- Story by: David Butler
- Produced by: David Butler
- Starring: Bing Crosby; Gloria Jean
- Cinematography: George Robinson
- Edited by: Irene Morra
- Music by: Charles Previn
- Production company: Universal Pictures
- Distributed by: Universal Pictures
- Release date: May 5, 1940 (USA)
- Running time: 93 minutes
- Country: United States
- Language: English
- Budget: $700,000

If I Had My Way is a 1940 musical comedy film directed by David Butler and starring Bing Crosby and Gloria Jean. Based on a story by David Butler, the film is about a construction worker who takes charge of the daughter of a friend killed in an accident.

Filming took place in Hollywood between February and April 1940. This was another independent production for Crosby outside his Paramount contract and he took a financial interest in it. The film had its New York premiere at the Rivoli Theater on May 5, 1940.

== Plot ==
Buzz Blackwell, Fred Johnson, and Axel Swenson are construction workers in San Francisco who are helping to build the Golden Gate Bridge. They are close friends, and Buzz and Axel even help Fred in raising his daughter Pat. When Fred dies in a tragic accident, Buzz and Axel resolve to find her relatives in New York City, whom she has never met. Buzz notifies Fred's brother, Jarvis Johnson, of Fred's death and Pat's impending arrival.

Jarvis and his wife Brenda are snobby socialites. Jarvis has received Buzz's telegram, but wants no part in raising Pat. When Buzz and company arrive, Jarvis denies knowledge of the telegram, pretends to be someone else, and sends them to "the other J. B. Johnson" across town. Joe Johnson—Jarvis's uncle—and his wife Marian are poor ex-vaudevillians, but welcome the girl with open arms. Buzz wants to give Joe the money he and his friends saved for Pat, but finds out a drunken Axel used this money to buy a failed Swedish restaurant.

Buzz allows Jarvis to think that Pat's stock certificates, left to her by her father, are valuable. Jarvis greedily pays Buzz $5,000, which Buzz uses to convert the Swedish restaurant into a vaudeville-themed nightclub. Jarvis returns to claim his money back, but the club is a success and Pat's friend—a banker—settles with Jarvis. The Johnson family feud is resolved.

== Cast ==
- Bing Crosby as Buzz Blackwell
- Gloria Jean as Pat Johnson
- Charles Winninger as Joe Johnson
- El Brendel as Axel Swenson
- Allyn Joslyn as Jarvis Johnson
- Claire Dodd as Brenda Johnson
- Moroni Olsen as John Blair, banker
- Nana Bryant as Marian Johnson
- Donald Woods as Fred Johnson
- Kathryn Adams as Miss Corbett
- Brandon Hurst as Hedges, Jarvis's butler
- Verna Felton as Mrs. De Lacey
- Dell Henderson as Mr. Harris, of the finance company
- Joe King as Pat, bank guard
- Emory Parnell as Gustav Erickson
- Blanche Ring as herself
- Eddie Leonard as himself
- Julian Eltinge as himself
- Trixie Friganza as herself

== Reception ==
Reviewers had kind words for Crosby and Jean, but some complained about the timeworn storyline, which was reminiscent of his 1936 film Pennies from Heaven, with Edith Fellows in the Gloria Jean role of the orphaned girl. Modern Screen noted the familiar plot: "What it lacks in story, it more than makes up for in cast. With Bing Crosby and Gloria Jean, the picture can't help but be entertaining. The trouble with the film lies in the fact that you know exactly what is going to happen from one reel to the next. You're sure that Gloria Jean's father will be killed in the beginning of the film, leaving Bing and El Brendel to take her to her wealthy New York uncle. You know the uncle will pack her off to her great-uncle... You realize that the restaurant Bing and Brendel are stuck with will turn out to be a whopping success. The director, David Butler, helps the story by handling it with a deft and sure touch." Publisher Pete Harrison dismissed the plot altogether: "When Crosby and Gloria sing, one forgets all about the story in sheer enjoyment of the music; Gloria's voice has matured and she is really charming."

Boxoffice also ignored the plot and classed the film strictly as a vehicle for the stars: "Bing is ably aided and abetted by Gloria Jean, captivating miss of the silvery voice. In fact the teaming of these two song birds is a ten-strike in smart casting and the resultant feature has much to offer customers of all ages and tastes, with a bonus for the oldsters who will enjoy a nostalgic thrill through the appearances of Blanche Ring, Eddie Leonard, and several other oldtimers whose stars shone brightly during the golden era of the theatah." The preview audience "greeted wildly the return of the oldtimers, and applauded the picture at its finish," reported Vance King of Motion Picture Daily who noted that (unusually for a Crosby picture) "there is no love interest in the film." Showmen's Trade Review saw it as a winner: "Universal has shown good judgment in teaming Bing Crosby, that sure-fire performer, with Gloria Jean, that youngster with the thrilling voice, and the result looks like a money attraction from all angles. All in all it's swell entertainment for the family trade."

Other critics assessed it as a tired plot resulting in a tired film. Bosley Crowther of The New York Times was not impressed: "The sum total is but a moderately amusing musical, more often flat than sharp—and this we say in spite of the fellow sitting next to us who kept telling his girl-friend solemnly, 'This is very entertaining, indeed.'" Variety did not think much of the film's chances either. "Bing Crosby will likely want to forget this cinematic adventure just as quickly as possible. Way below par as compared with his releases for both Universal and Paramount during the past two years, If I Had My Way will need all of his draw strength to get it through the key runs for nominal grosses."

== Revivals ==
Universal reissued If I Had My Way in 1946, when Bing Crosby was the number-one boxoffice star. The studio removed 11 minutes of material, including most of the vaudeville specialties. Gloria Jean, no longer under contract to Universal, was barely acknowledged in the reissue, with newly filmed titles removing her equal billing, and new posters emphasizing Bing Crosby and downplaying his young co-star. Featured comedian El Brendel, who had been the screen's leading comic in 1930, was considered too dated a name and removed from the new posters completely. The shortened, 82-minute reissue print was itself re-released by Realart Pictures in 1950, and all prints prepared for the rental market and for television were the abridged version.

If I Had My Way was restored to its original 93-minute length and content for a 2006 DVD release, as part of a Bing Crosby boxed set. DVD Talk praised Crosby and thought Jean was cute, but criticized the plot, and called the film "strictly second-run material". Universal now offers If I Had My Way as a standalone single disc, as part of its "Vault" series.

== Soundtrack ==
- "Meet the Sun Half-Way" (James V. Monaco / Johnny Burke) sung by Bing Crosby and Gloria Jean.
- "I Haven't Time to Be a Millionaire" (James V. Monaco / Johnny Burke) sung by Bing Crosby, Gloria Jean, and (coda only) El Brendel.
- "The Pessimistic Character" (James V. Monaco / Johnny Burke) sung by Bing Crosby, Gloria Jean, El Brendel, Charles Winninger, and Nana Bryant.
- "If I Had My Way" (James Kendis / Lou Klein) sung by Bing Crosby.
- "April Played the Fiddle" (James V. Monaco / Johnny Burke) sung by Bing Crosby with Six Hits and a Miss.
- "Ida, Sweet As Apple Cider" (Eddie Leonard / Eddie Munson) sung by Eddie Leonard with Six Hits and a Miss.
- "Little Grey Home in the West" (Hermann Löhr / D. Eardley-Wilmot) sung by Gloria Jean.
- "I've Got Rings On My Fingers" sung by Blanche Ring with Six Hits and a Miss.

Bing Crosby recorded a number of the songs for Decca Records. "April Played the Fiddle" enjoyed seven weeks in the Billboard, charts peaking at No. 10. "Meet the Sun Half-Way" reached the No. 15 mark during four weeks in the charts. Crosby's songs were also included in the Bing's Hollywood series.
