= Dabiri (surname) =

Dabiri is the surname of the following people:

- Abike Dabiri, Nigerian politician
- Bahram Dabiri (born 1950), Iranian painter and artist
- Emma Dabiri, Irish writer and broadcaster
- John Dabiri (born 1980), American biophysicist, professor of aeronautics and bioengineering
- Shahram Dabiri Oskuei (born 1960), Iranian politician, physician and sporting director
