= Cedar Grove Cemetery (Queens) =

Cemetery in Flushing, Queens County, New York

Coordinates: 40°44′08″N 73°49′52″W

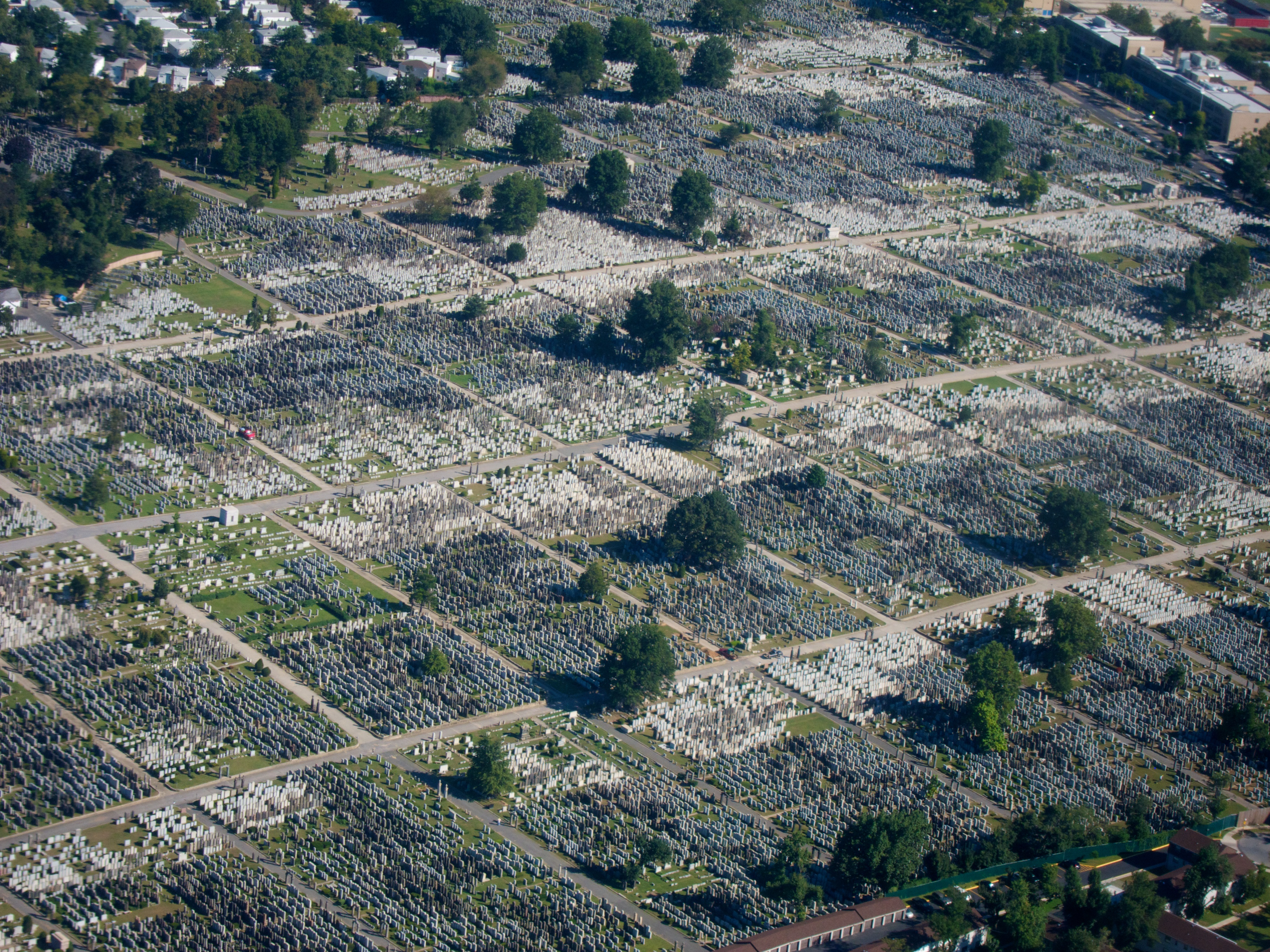
Aerial view of the cemetery

Cedar Grove Cemetery is a nonsectarian cemetery in Flushing, Queens, New York]], United States. The cemetery occupies the former Spring Hill estate of colonial governor Cadwallader Colden.

== History ==
It was established in 1893 and is still in operation. When Union Cemetery in Brooklyn closed in 1897, more than 20,000 bodies were disinterred and transferred to Cedar Grove Cemetery. As of 2025, Cedar Grove Cemetery reports over 36,000 burials.

Mount Hebron Cemetery was established in 1903 as the Jewish section of Cedar Grove Cemetery and is the burial site of several prominent participants in Yiddish theater.

Cedar Grove was a filming location for cemetery scenes in the 1968 film, Bye Bye Braverman.

== Notable burials ==
- August Claessens (1885–1954), Socialist politician, who served in the New York State Assembly
- Sabrina Grigorian (1956–1986), Italian-born Armenian actress.
- Eddie Leonard (1870–1941), American vaudeville performer
- one British Commonwealth war grave, of a Gunner of the Bermuda Artillery Militia of World War I.
