= Bahram Dabiri =

Iranian artist

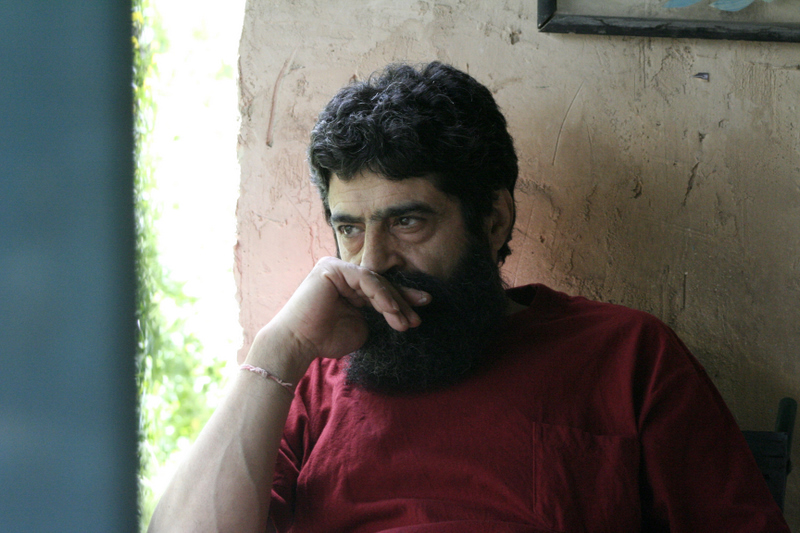
- بهرام دبیری - Bahram Dabiri
- Born: Bahram Dabiri; Shiraz, Iran
- Education: Tehran School of Fine Arts
- Known for: Painting
- Notable work: Rooster; Cubism
- Spouse: Simin Ekrami

Bahram Dabiri (Persian: بهرام دبیری; b. 1950) is an Iranian painter and visual artist. Dabiri's work has been displayed in many exhibitions in Iran, United States, Spain, Germany and United Arab Emirates.

== Academic career ==
In 1970, he was accepted into the Fine Arts Department of Tehran University, and received his undergraduate degree in painting.

== Exhibitions ==
Dabiri's work has been displayed, among others, at Museum of Contemporary Art, Tehran, French Embassy, Tehran, 2000 Art Expo New York, 2000 Contemporary Iranian Modern Art exhibition, New York, Reagan Center, Washington, Fabien Fryns Gallery, Marbella, Spain, Hotel Mirage, UAE, Bernak Gallery, Bremen, Germany.

== Influences ==
Dabiri's initial influence came by the works of Hieronymus Bosch and Pieter Bruegel the Elder. He studied under Hannibal Alkhas, Behjat Sadr, Parviz Tanavoli and Ruyin Pakbaz.
