= Church of the Risen Lord =

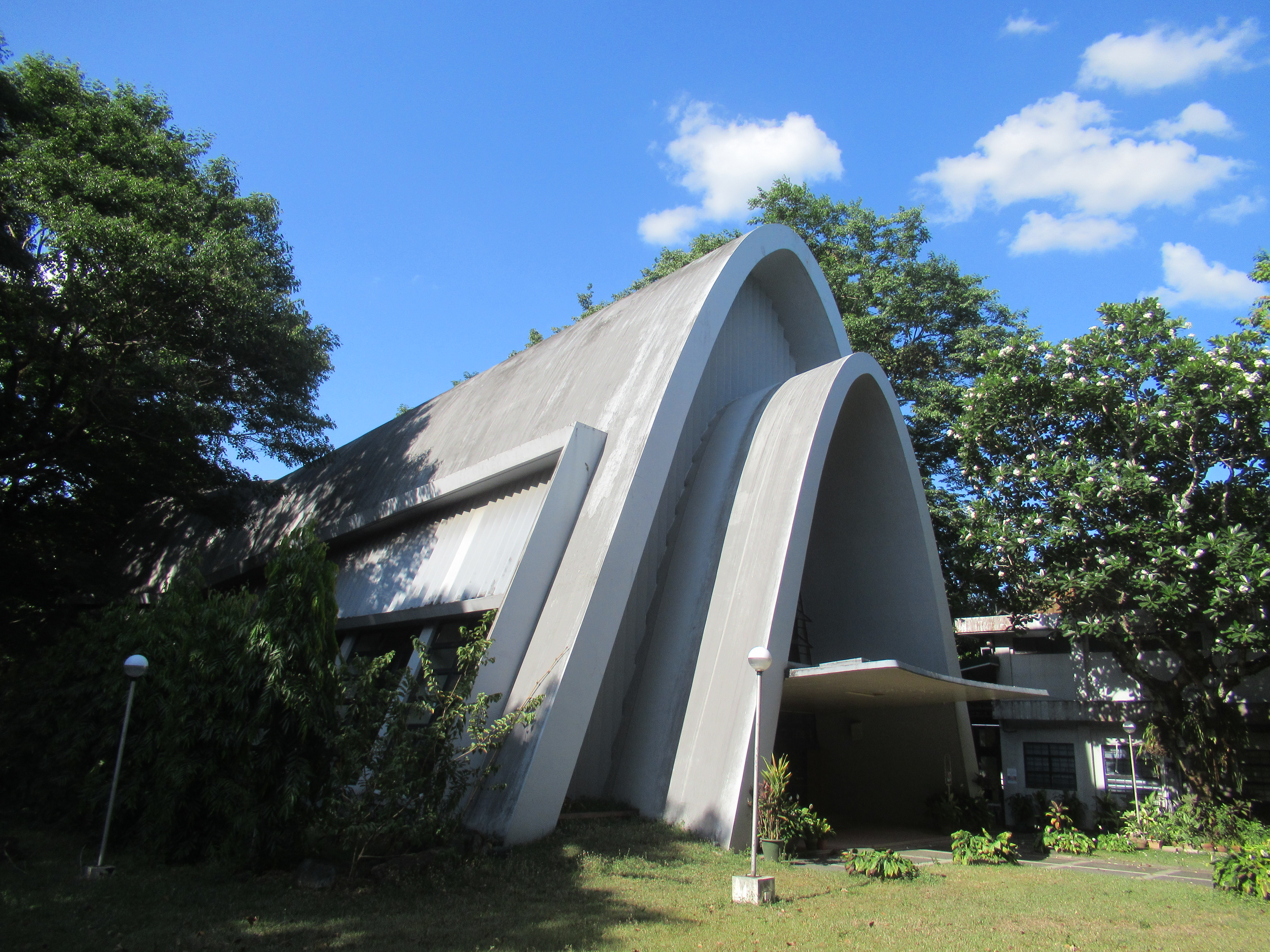
- Church of the Risen Lord

- Location within Metro Manila
- 14°39′34″N 121°04′19″E
- Location: Laurel Avenue, Diliman, Quezon City
- Country: Philippines
- Denomination: Protestant

Architecture
- Architect: Cesar Concio
- Architectural type: Church building

The Church of the Risen Lord is a Protestant church located in the University of the Philippines campus in Diliman, Quezon City, Philippines. It was constructed in the 1950s through the Christian Youth Movement (CYM), a student youth group.

== Architecture ==
The Church of the Risen Lord was designed by Filipino architect Cesar Concio. The building is located nearby another landmark chapel in the campus, the Parish of the Holy Sacrifice, designed by Leandro Locsin.

The structure was proclaimed in the 1950's as "an engineering masterpiece with its double parabola". The chapel is saddle-shaped – a hyperbolic paraboloid with flat ends. The lower slopes of the vaulted wall were punctured by windows and vertical louvers at both sides of the longitudinal elevation. The glass-clad façade has an opening defined by a smaller arch that supported a cantilevered porte-cochere. This entrance directly led to the processional nave, terminating the vision at the altar. Just above the entrance, a choir loft could be ascended via a circular winding stair. It is one of the few churches that is modernly designed and lacks iconographic religious references.

=== Criticism ===
In a 1957 article of the Sunday Times Magazine entitled “The Ugly City”, architectural critic I.V. Mallari identified and lambasted specimens of modern architecture in Manila as miniaturized facsimiles of modern architecture abroad. His enumeration included Concio's chapel in Diliman which he claimed to have been drawn from a chapel in Wichita, Kansas. Filipino architectural historian Gerard Lico deemed the claim "too hasty and lacked the value of historical explication to be the sole basis of disputing the church's conceptual originality".
