= Shokouh Riazi =

Iranian Modernist painter (1921–1962)

- شکوه ریاضی
- Born: 1921; Tehran, Sublime State of Iran
- Died: 1962 (aged 40–41); Tehran, Imperial State of Iran
- Other names: Mathi Shkoh al-Maluk, Mathi Shkoh al-Molk, Shokooh Riyazi
- Education: Beaux-Arts de Paris
- Occupations: Visual artist, educator
- Known for: Painting
- Movement: Modernism
- Parents: Ali Riazi (father); Betul Dowlatshahi (mother)

Shokouh Riazi (Persian: شکوه ریاضی; 1921–1962) was an Iranian Modernist painter and educator. She was a pioneer of modern art in Iran and is thought to have been the first Iranian woman to study art in Paris.

Riazi taught painting classes, and some members of the Saqqakhaneh movement were her students.

== Biography ==
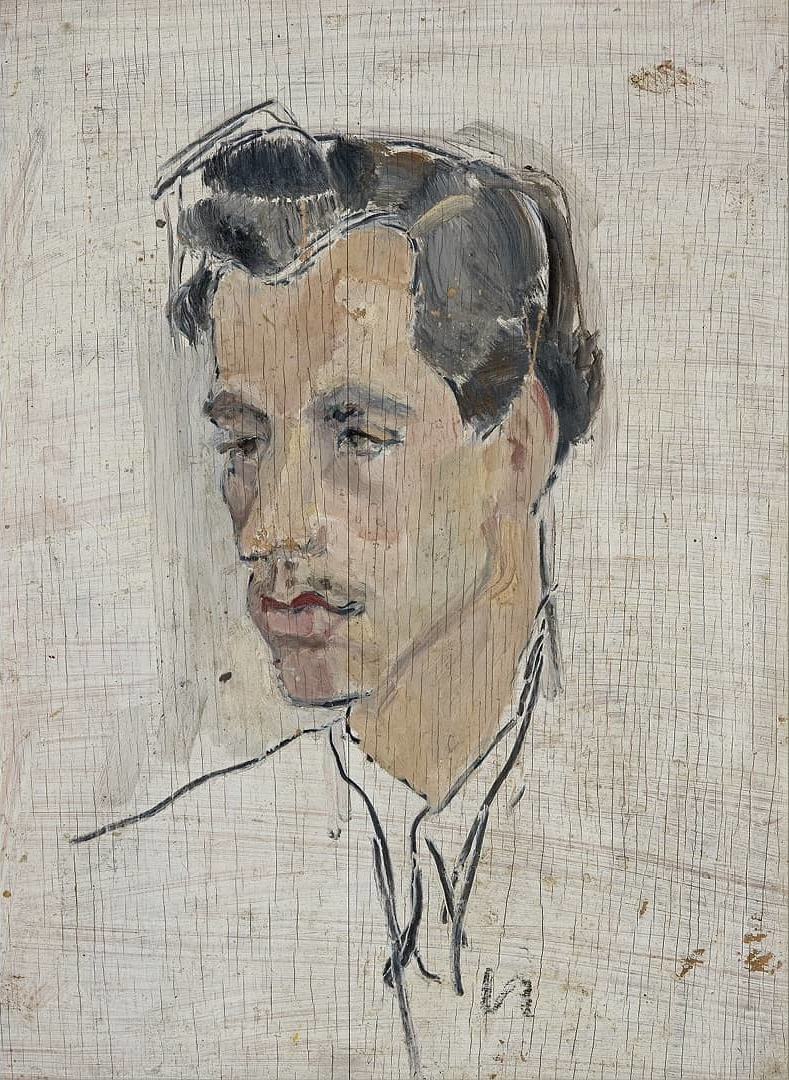
"Portrait of Dariush Eskandani" by Shokouh Riazi, Tehran Museum of Contemporary Art

Shokouh Riazi was born in 1921 in Tehran, Qajar Iran, into a prosperous family. Her mother was Betul Dowlatshahi of the aristocratic Dowlatshahi family, and was the daughter of Qajar prince and Islamic philosopher Badi-al-Molk Mirza. Shokouh Riazi's father was Ali Riazi, a politician who served as an Iranian military attaché in France. Because of her father's work she lived in Paris until the age 14, after which her family moved to Shiraz. She was fluent in French and served as a translator between French and Persian.

Riazi initially entered university studying medicine at Tehran University (now University of Tehran), but never completed it. Instead, Riazi switched departments and studied in the Faculty of Fine Arts at Tehran University, where she graduated in 1946.

She later studied at Beaux-Arts de Paris. Her classmate was Iranian artist Javad Hamidi, in both Tehran and Paris. She continued her studies in painting under André Lhote in Paris.

She was influenced by the work of Amedeo Modigliani and his elongated female portraits.

Riazi taught portraiture classes in the College of Decorative Arts at Tehran University. Many of her students were members of the later Saqqakhaneh movement, including Charles Hossein Zenderoudi, Faramarz Pilaram, Mansoor Ghandriz, and Massoud Arabshahi.

In 1962, she died of cancer in Tehran. Due to her premature death, there is a limited amount of her artwork. Riazi's work can be found in the collection of Tehran Museum of Contemporary Art.

== See also ==
- List of Iranian women artists
