= Sabrina Grigorian =

- Սաբրինա Մարկոսի Գրիգորյան
- Born: July 28, 1956; Rome, Lazio, Italy
- Died: June 10, 1986 (aged 29); New York City, New York
- Occupation: Actress
- Father: Marcos Grigorian

Sabrina Grigorian (Armenian: Սաբրինա Մարկոսի Գրիգորյան; 1956–1986) was an Italian-born Armenian actress.

== Life and career ==
Sabrina Grigorian was born in Rome, Italy, on July 28, 1956, to artist Marcos Grigorian and Flora Adamian. After the divorce of her parents, Sabrina was brought up by her father and Sabrina acquired primary schooling in Tehran at a special school for talented children. She then later attended high school at New York City. Coming back to Tehran she met Patricia Zich, theater director at the Community School, and also director of The Masquers, an international theater organization of young adults in Tehran. Zich recognized Sabrina's extraordinary artistic talent.

After graduating from high school Sabrina went to London, auditioned and was admitted to the Guildhall School of Music and Drama to study acting. During those years Sabrina traveled extensively. She went to United States, to Switzerland, Spain, Italy and many other places absorbing all the knowledge she could. She was fluent in Armenian, English, French, was familiar with Persian, Italian, Spanish. As a student Sabrina played a dozen different roles ranging from supporting to Leading ones in Tehran and at Guildhall. During her training as an actress in Tehran and later at the Guildhall School of Music and Drama, Sabrina played Rosa Gonzalez in Tennessee Williams "Summer and Smoke", Hippolyta in Shakespeare's "A Midsummer Night's Dream" and Emilia in "Othello", Masha in Anton Chekhov's "The Three Sisters", Dina in Ibsen's "The Pillar of the Community", Belvidera in Thomas Ottoway's "Venice Preserved", the Dark Lady in George Bernard Shaw's "The Dark Lady of the Sonnets", Margot in Frances H. Goodrich's "Anne Frank: The Diary of a Young Girl", Corie in Neil Simon's "Barefoot in the Park", Mrs. Martin in Eugene Ionesco's "The Bald Soprano" and Medea in Robinson Jeffers' Adaptation of the Euripides' play.

During her time on the stage, Sabrina portrayed and created characters that her audience, teachers, and directors admired.

For three years, Sabrina was editorial and research assistant to Gene Shalit, the director of the "Today" show at NBC. While working at New York City, she wrote several theatrical and musical commentaries and articles which were published in Delta Sky Magazine, Ladies Home Journal, Diversion Magazine and other periodicals. She also prepared scripts for "on-air" viewing.

She died on July 10, 1986, of a heart attack, and is buried in Cedar Grove Cemetery in Flushing, Queens, New York City.
