= Jamshidieh Park =

Park in Tehran, Iran

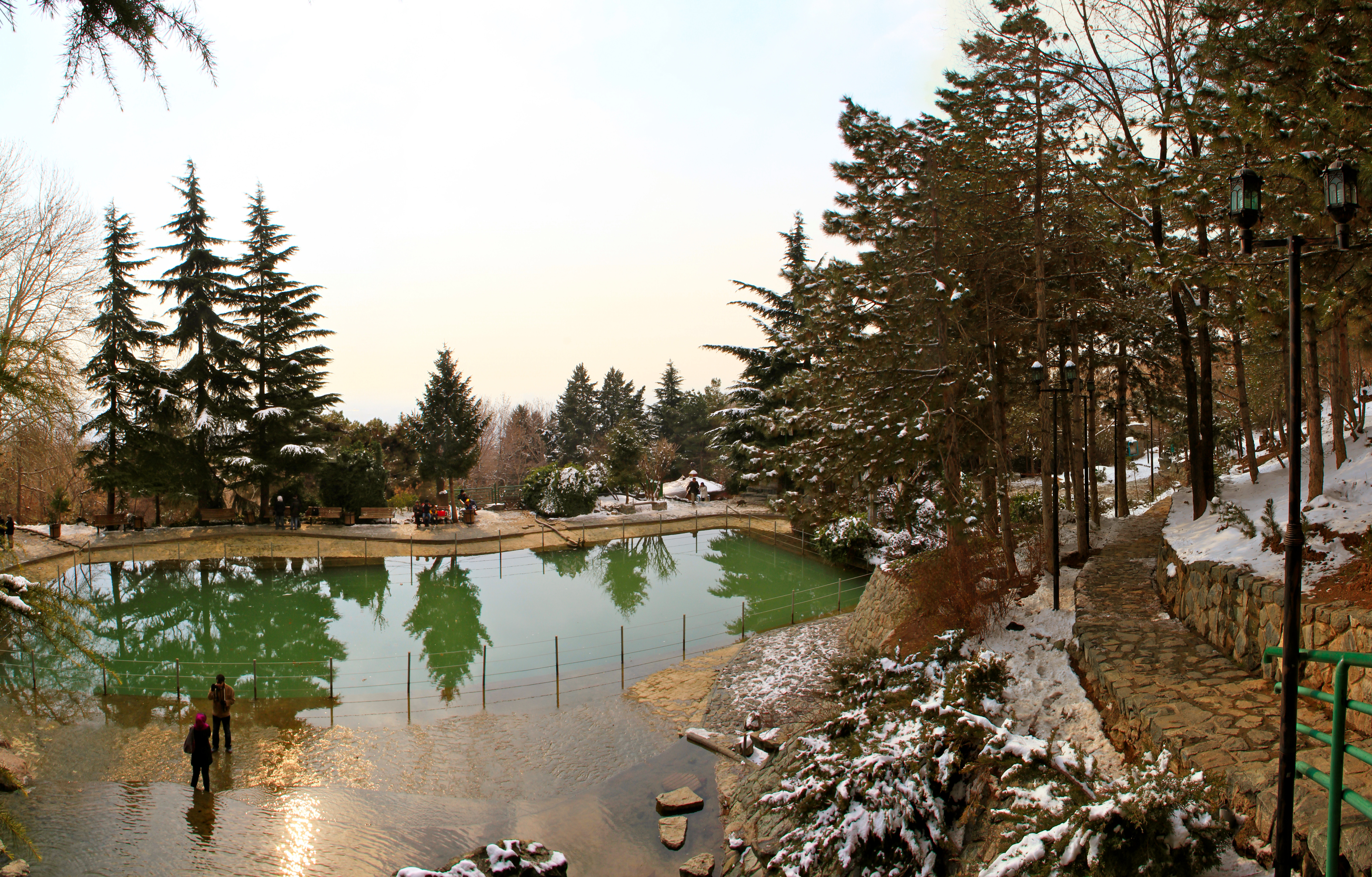
- Interactive map of Jamshidieh Park
- Type: Public park
- Location: Tehran, Iran
- Coordinates: 35°49′36.65″N 51°27′53.54″E
- Area: 69 hectares (0.69 km^{2}; 0.27 sq mi)
- Created: 1977
- Status: Open year round

Jamshidieh Park (Persian: بوستان جمشیدیه), also Jamshidieh Rocky Garden, is a large park in northern Tehran, at the foothills of Kolakchal mountain in Iran. The 69-hectare (170-acre) park is known for its rocky forest terrain, waterfall, and steep hills which offer panoramic city views. It is in the neighbourhood of Niavaran and has four entrances. From inside the park, visitors can continue on a hiking path to the peak.

== History ==
During the Pahlavi era, the premises were established as a private garden by the Qajar prince and engineer, Jamshid Davallu Qajar. He left this garden to the last Empress of Iran, Farah Pahlavi.

The modern public park was built in 1977 and expanded in 1995, with the addition of Ferdowsi garden, named after the poet.

== Features ==
The main waterfall and pond are central to the garden's design. Climbing the stairs behind the man-made waterfall offers scenic views of Tehran. It has numerous stone statues and fountains.

The center of the park has a restaurant and tea house. There is also an art house and amphitheatre in the park.

== Gallery ==
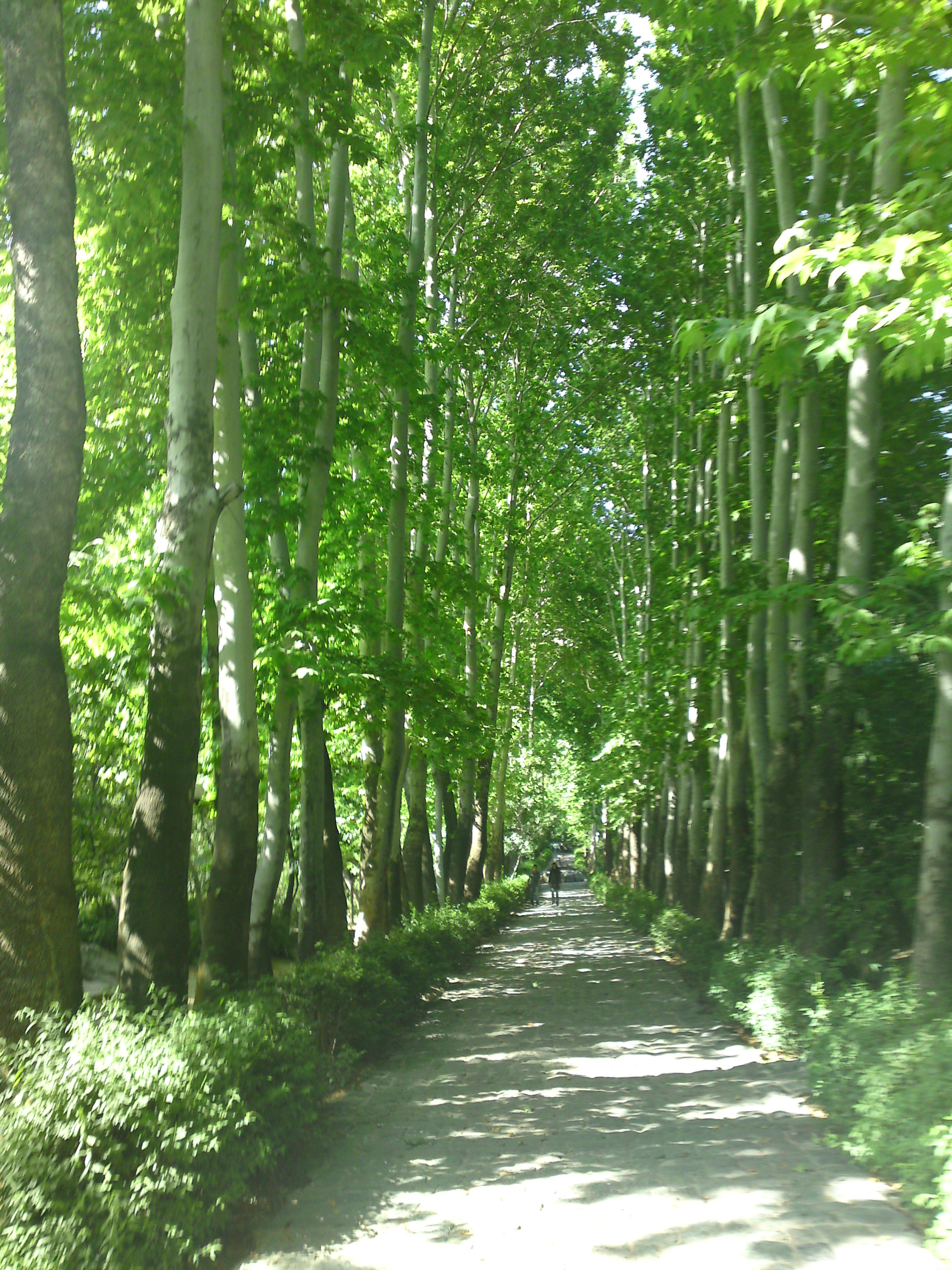

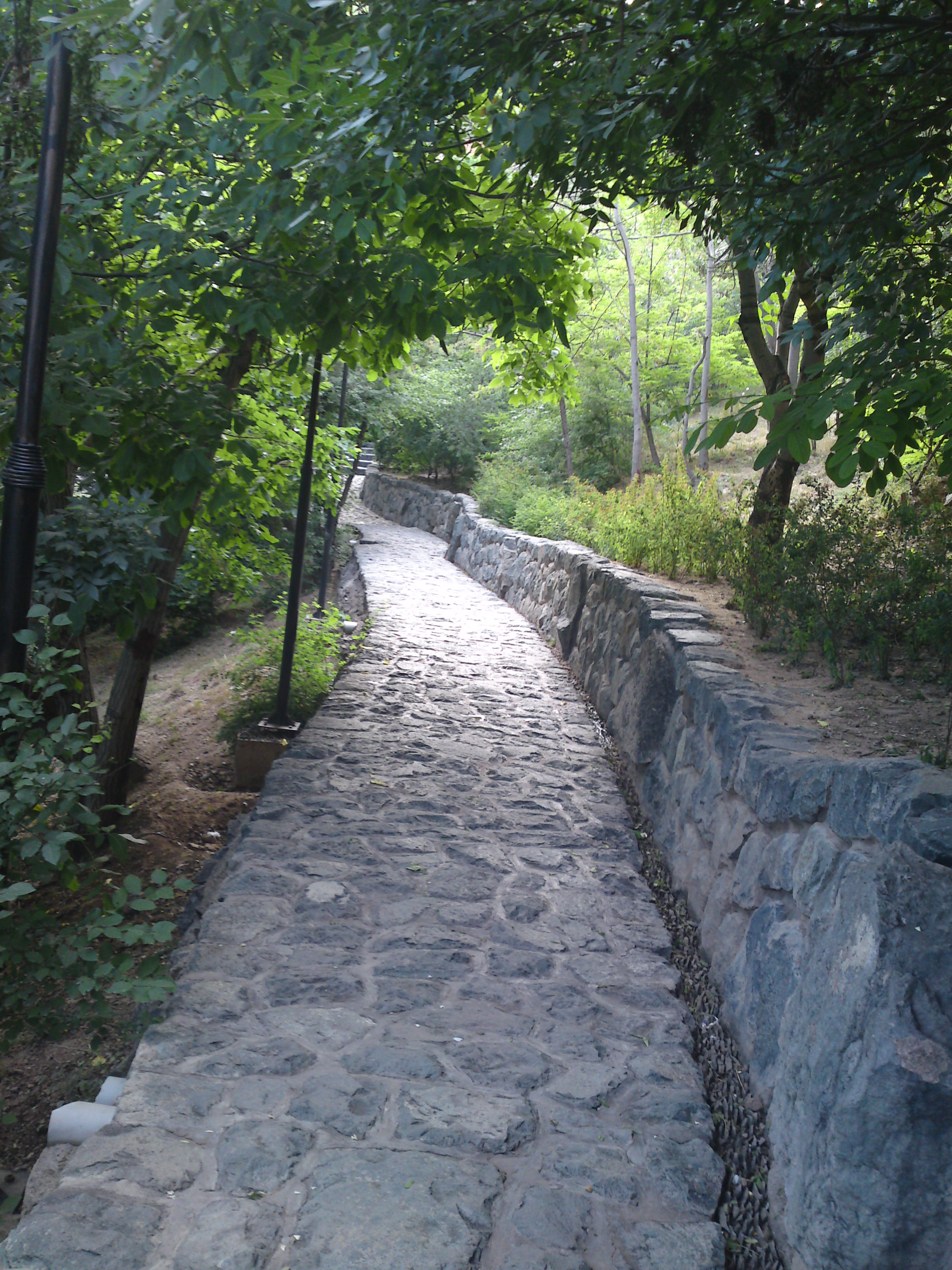
Jamshidieh Park.

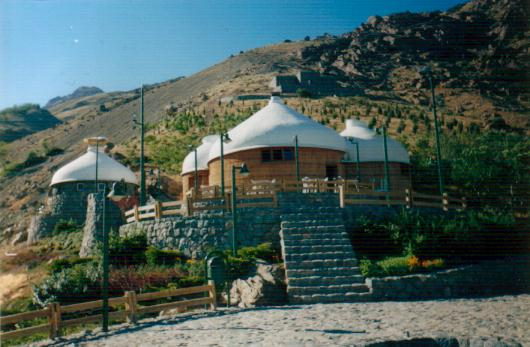
A restaurant in Jamshidieh Park built in the shape of Turkmen yurts.

Steps and narrow water channel.

Common Carp, Goldfish and Koi are kept in the garden's pond.

Stone sculpture by Naser Houshmand Vaziri

The garden features work by the artist Mashhadi Ismaili.
