= Encyclopedia of Art =

The Encyclopedia of Art
- Author: Ruyin Pakbaz
- Original title: دایرةالمعارف هنر
- Language: Persian
- Subject: Art
- Published: 1998 (Publications in Contemporary Culture)
- Publication place: Iran
- Media type: Print
- Pages: 1033 pp.
- ISBN: 964-5545-41-2

The Encyclopedia of Art (Persian: دایرةالمعارف هنر) is a book written by Ruyin Pakbaz and published in Iran by Publications in Contemporary Culture.

The primary subjects of the book are painting, sculpting, and graphic design, while pottery, calligraphy, music, and architecture are also discussed. The encyclopedia has 2855 entries with 844 black-and-white and 160 colour images. It is divided into one main section and three appendices, each of which is organized in alphabetical order.

The main section concerns various artists, styles and schools, materials and tools, technical terminology, and aesthetics. The first appendix analyzes historical developments in art and the second considers common themes such as religious or literary figures, gods, and events. The third appendix presents Persian equivalents and similar expressions to over 1580 loanwords. Much of the book is dedicated to Iranian art, in particular contemporary art.

== See also ==
- List of art reference books
