= Esfand, Gilan =

Village in Gilan province, Iran

Esfand Persian: اسفند
- Village
- Location within Iran
- Coordinates: 37°24′11″N 49°18′45″E
- Country: Iran
- Province: Gilan
- County: Sowme'eh Sara
- District: Ziabar
- Rural District: Ziabar

Population (2016)
  - Total: 350
- Time zone: UTC+3:30 (IRST)

Esfand (Persian: اسفند) (Note: Also known as Espand (اسپند)) is a village in Ziabar Rural District of Ziabar District in Sowme'eh Sara County, Gilan province, Iran.

== Demographics ==
=== Population ===
At the time of the 2006 National Census, the village's population was 528 in 157 households, when it was in the Central District. The following census in 2011 counted 423 people in 145 households. The 2016 census measured the population of the village as 350 people in 134 households.

In 2021, the rural district was separated from the district in the formation of Ziabar District.
