= Ghobad Shiva =

Iranian graphic designer (born 1940)

Ghobad Shiva (Persian: قباد شیوا, born 23 January 1941 in Hamadan, Iran) is an Iranian graphic designer.

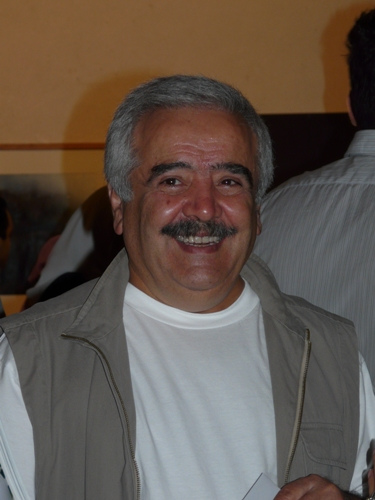
Ghobad Shiva

== Career ==
Shiva graduated in 1966 from the Faculty of Fine Arts of the University of Tehran. He worked in the field, later earning a master's degree from Pratt University, New York City, in 1980.

His secondary activities included the establishment of graphic art sections for the Iranian radio and TV in 1968 and for Soroush Publisher in 1971. He was also one of the co-founders of the Iranian graphic designer society "IGDS", an artist advisor and jury member of the Iranian graphic art Biennal.

He has been teaching in eminent art faculties in Tehran since 1976.

Shiva's work has been exhibited in Iran, England, France, and the United States. His works have appeared in graphic art periodicals and books.

He is a member of the Society of Alliance Graphique Internationale (AGI) and directs his own institution, offering artistic management and advisory services, as well as designing environmental projects and exhibition areas. The referenced book comprises a selection of posters he has created in different decades.
