= Abby Weed Grey =

Art collector and philanthropist (1902–1983)

- Born: Abby Weed; 1902; Minnesota, U.S.
- Died: 1983 (aged 80–81); Saint Paul, Minnesota, U.S.
- Occupations: Art collector, art patron
- Known for: Grey Art Museum at New York University
- Spouse: Benjamin Edwards Grey (m. 1924–1956; his death)

Abby Weed Grey (1902–1983) was an art collector and patron for whom New York University's Grey Art Gallery is named. Grey had a particular interest in non-Western modern art, and pieces from the Middle East were particularly well-represented in her collection.

== Early life and education ==
Abby Weed was born in 1902 in Minnesota and was educated at Vassar College. She married Benjamin Edwards Grey, an army officer, in 1924.

== Career ==
Grey was a native of Saint Paul, Minnesota. She established the Ben and Abby Grey Foundation to sponsor artists after her husband died in 1956. Throughout the 1960s and 1970s, Grey undertook curatorial projects such as Fourteen Contemporary Iranians (1962–65), curated by Parviz Tanavoli and Turkish Art Today (1966–70), each of which toured the United States; Communication Through Art (1964), which opened simultaneously in Istanbul, Tehran, and Lahore, before traveling throughout the eastern Mediterranean, Asia, and eastern Africa; and One World Through Art. By 1979, Grey had become one of American's prominent collectors of Asian and Middle Eastern art.

Grey served on the Board of Trustees of the Minnesota Society of Fine Arts (1967–1973) and the Minneapolis College of Art and Design's Board of Overseers (1964–1983). In 1974 she established the Grey Art Gallery at New York University. She endowed the Grey Fellowship in Museum Studies at the Walker Art Center, and in 1979, established and endowed The Grey Fine Arts Library and Study Center, a resource in NYU's Department of Art History (formerly Department of Fine Arts).

Grey was also the author of The Picture is the Window; the Window is the Picture, her autobiography, which was published by New York University Press.
