= Grey Art Museum =

Art museum in Manhattan, New York

Grey Art Gallery, New York University

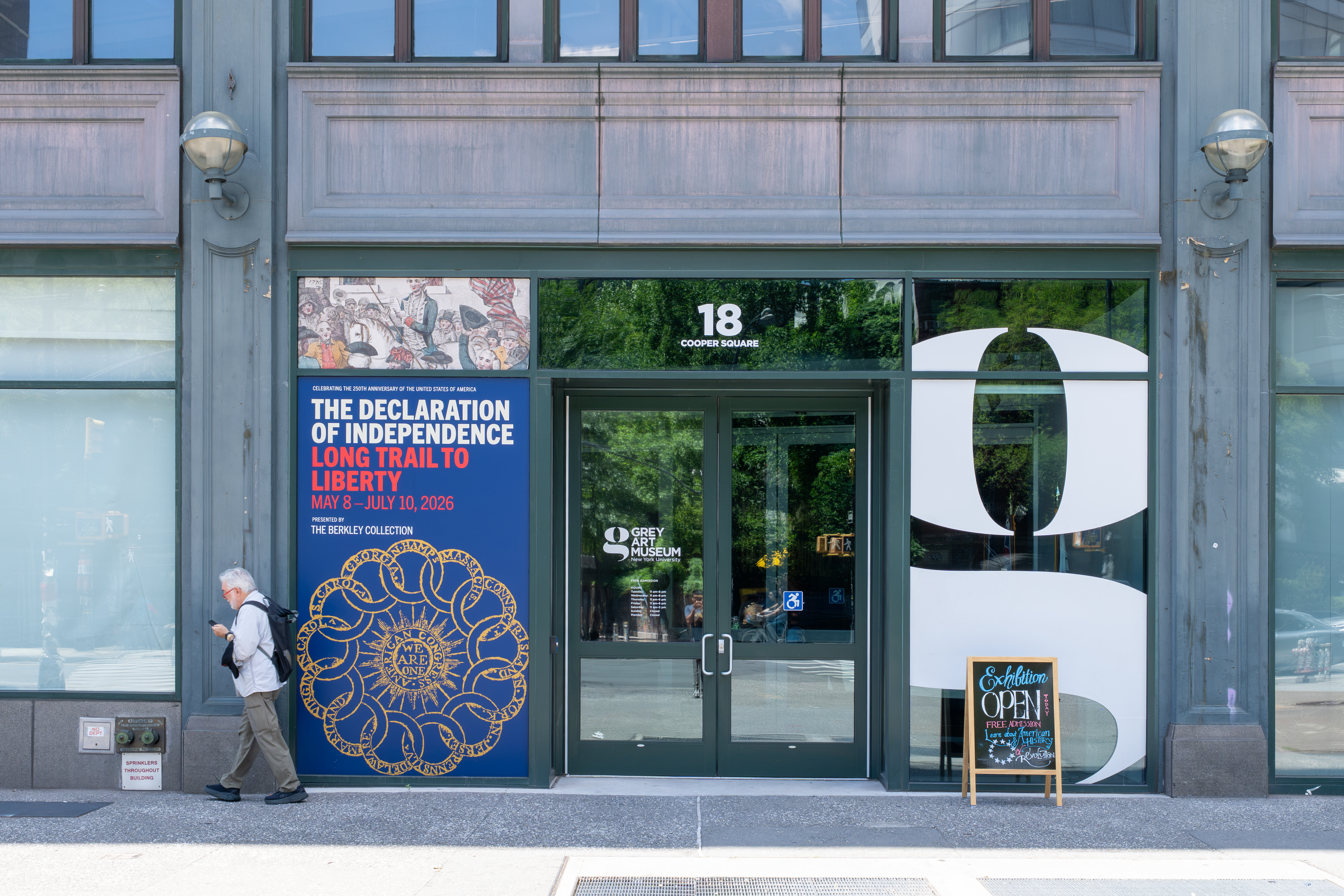
- 18 Cooper Sq
- Established: 1974
- Location: New York University; New York, New York
- Coordinates: 40.73025°N 73.99568°W
- Type: University art museum
- Website: greyartgallery.nyu.edu

The Grey Art Museum, known until 2023 as the Grey Art Gallery, is New York University's fine art museum. As a university art museum, the Grey Art Gallery functions to collect, preserve, study, document, interpret, and exhibit the evidence of human culture. NYU's art collection was named the Grey Art Gallery in 1973 following a major gift of one thousand works from Abby Weed Grey. The museum opened to the public in 1975. The Abby Weed Grey Collection of Modern Asian and Middle Eastern Art at NYU comprises some 700 works produced by artists from countries as diverse as Japan, Thailand, India, Kashmir, Nepal, Pakistan, Iran, Turkey, and Israel.

The Grey Art Gallery also oversees New York University's art collection. Founded in 1958 with the acquisition of Francis Picabia's Resonateur (1922) and Fritz Glarner's Relational Painting (1949–50), the NYU Art Collection comprises approximately 5,000 works, mainly dating from the 19th and 20th centuries, such as Pablo Picasso's Bust of Sylvette (1967), currently installed at University Village (Manhattan); Joseph Cornell's Chocolat Menier (1952); and works by Henri Matisse, Joan Miró, and Ilya Bolotowsky, as well as Romare Bearden, Arshile Gorky, Adolph Gottlieb, Kenneth Noland, Jane Freilicher, Ad Reinhardt, and Alex Katz, among many others.

== Location ==
Until 2023, the Gallery was housed in the Silver Center (formerly Main Building), on the site on NYU's original home, the legendary University Building (1835–94), where artists and writers, including Samuel Colt, Winslow Homer, George Inness, and Henry James, worked. It was also here that Professor Samuel F. B. Morse established the first academic art department in the U.S.

Between 1927 and 1943, the space that became the Grey hosted Albert Eugene Gallatin Gallery (later Museum) of Living Art—the first American museum exclusively devoted to modernist art. In exhibiting work by Pablo Picasso, Fernand Léger, Joan Miró, Kazimir Malevich, Piet Mondrian, Jean Arp, and artists associated with the American Abstract Artists group, Gallatin created a forum for intellectual exchange and a place where visitors could view the latest developments in art.

In 2023, NYU announced that when it reopened in March 2024 following renovations and a closure for the COVID-19 pandemic, the museum would be known as the Grey Art Museum and would move to 18 Cooper Square where it would have larger galleries as well as a study center.

== History ==
NYU lacked a permanent museum until 1975, when a private donation gift from Abby Weed Grey enabled the historic venue's renovation and improvement of the historic venue, and the doors reopened as the Grey Art Gallery and Study Center in 1975. Weed Grey collected some 700 works of modern art on her travels throughout Asia and the Middle East.

In 1983, Grey Art Gallery was the first organization in the United States to show a major Frida Kahlo exhibit.

== Collections ==
=== Abby Weed Grey Collection of Modern Asian and Middle Eastern Art ===
The gallery was endowed by Abby Weed Grey, who also donated some 700 works of modern art that she acquired during her frequent travels in Asia and the Middle East. The Abby Weed Grey Collection constitutes the largest institutional holdings of modern Iranian and Turkish art outside those countries. Grey was especially supportive of Iranian art, which comprises one-fifth of her collection at NYU. She also donated significant holdings of works by artists from Turkey and India. Many of the artists whose works she collected adapted their culture's indigenous aesthetic traditions to contemporary circumstances, and they often blend representation and abstraction.

=== The New York University Art Collection ===
The New York University Art Collection, of which the Grey Art Gallery is now guardian, was founded in 1958 with NYU's acquisition of Francis Picabia's Resonateur (c. 1922) and Fritz Glarner's Relational Painting (1949–50). Today the collection (which includes approximately 6,000 objects) is primarily composed of late-19th and 20th-century works, ranging from Pablo Picasso's monumental public sculpture Bust of Sylvette to a Joseph Cornell box, Chocolat Menier, from 1952. The collection's particular strength is American painting from the 1940s to the present. European prints are also well represented, with works by Henri Matisse, Joan Miró, and Picasso, to name a few.

Artists in the NYU Art Collection include: Milton Avery, Ilya Bolotowsky, Sonia Delaunay, Arshile Gorky, Édouard Manet, Francis Picabia, and many others. The collection is especially rich in works by artists working in New York in the 1950s and '60s, such as Willem de Kooning, Helen Frankenthaler, Adolph Gottlieb, Al Held, Romare Bearden, Ching Ho Cheng, Hans Hofmann, Alex Katz, Nicholas Krushenick, Yayoi Kusama, Agnes Martin, Robert Motherwell, Louise Nevelson, Kenneth Noland, Robert Rauschenberg, Ad Reinhardt, and Bernard (Tony) Rosenthal.

== Selected exhibitions ==
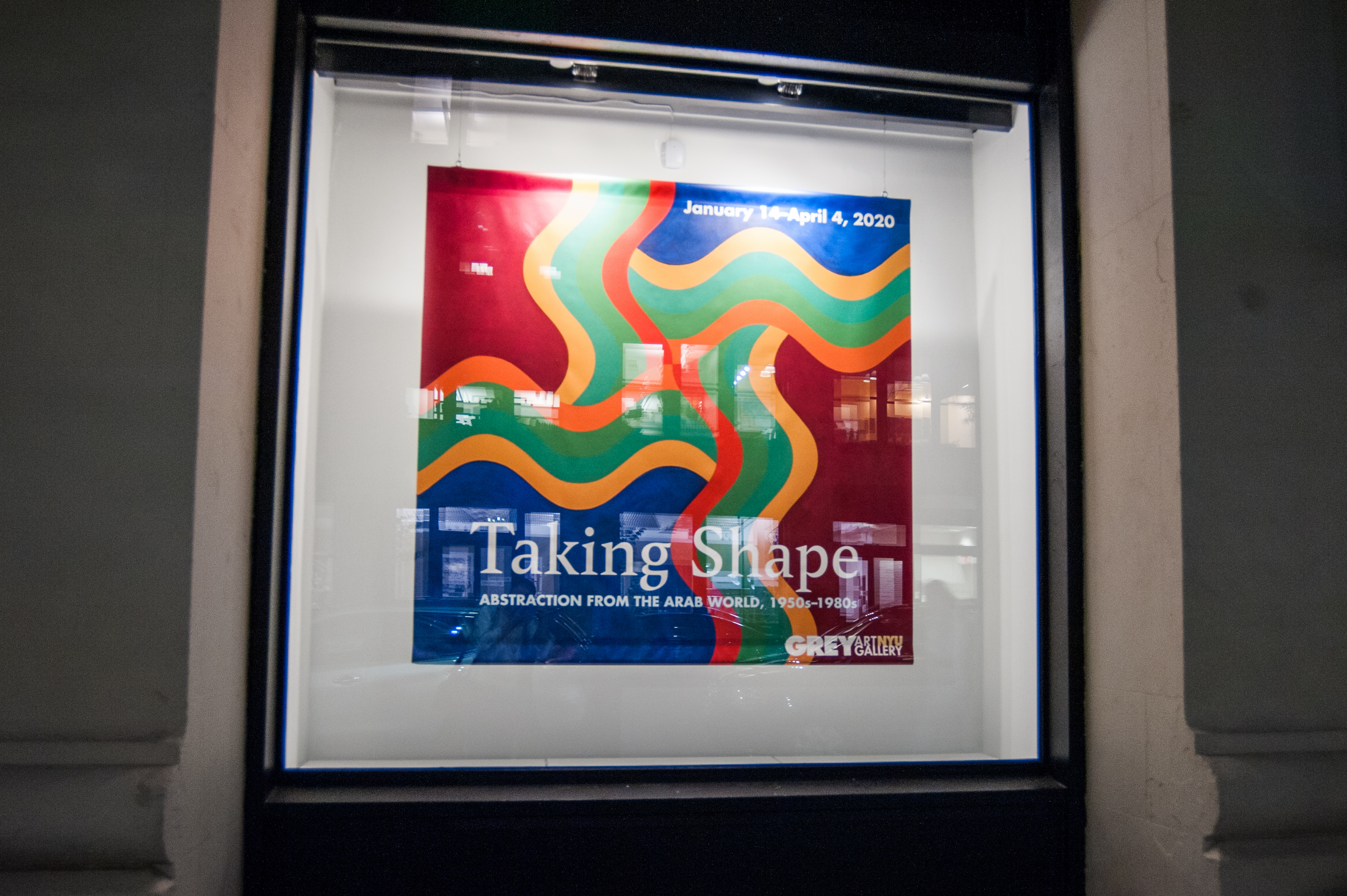
Barjeel's Taking Shape Exhibition at the Grey Art Gallery

This list comprises a selection of the exhibitions organized by the Grey Art Gallery at New York University from its opening in 1975 through today.

- 1975: Inaugural Exhibition: Selections from the Abby Weed Grey Collection
- 1976: Inaugural Exhibition, Part II: Selections from the New York University Art Collection
- 1976: Parviz Tanavoli: Fifteen Years of Bronze Sculpture
- 1978: The Decorative Designs of Frank Lloyd Wright. Co-organized by the Smithsonian American Art Museum and the Grey Art Gallery and Study Center
- 1981: The Photography of Space Exploration
- 1981: Tracking The Marvelous
- 1983: Frida Kahlo and Tina Modotti Organized by the Whitechapel Art Gallery, London
- 1984: Giovanni Boldini and Society Portraiture: 1880–1920
- 1985: Precious: An American Cottage Industry of the Eighties
- 1989: "Success Is a Job in New York": The Early Art and Business of Andy Warhol. Organized by the Grey Art Gallery and the Carnegie Museum of Art, Pittsburg.
- 1989: Against Nature: Japanese Art in the Eighties. Organized by the List Visual Arts Center at MIT, the Japan Foundation, and the Grey Art Gallery
- 1994: From Media to Metaphor: Art About AIDS. Organized by the Grey Art Gallery and Independent Curators Inc.
- 1997: Nahum B. Zenil: Witness to the Self
- 1999: Inverted Odysseys: Claude Cahun, Maya Deren, Cindy Sherman
- 1999: When Time Began to Rant and Rage: Figurative Painting from Twentieth-Century Ireland. Organized by the University of California, Berkeley Art Museum
- 2002: Between Word and Image: Modern Iranian Visual Culture
- 2004: Electrifying Art: Atsuko Tanaka, 1954–1968. Co-organized by the Grey Art Gallery and the Morris and Helen Belkin Art Gallery at the University of British Columbia, Vancouver
- 2006: The Downtown Show: The New York Art Scene 1974–1984. Co-organized by the Grey Art Gallery and Fales Library, New York University
- 2008: New York Cool: Painting and Sculpture from the NYU Art Collection, Grey Art Gallery, New York University
- 2008: The Poetics of Cloth: African Textiles / Recent Art
- 2009: Icons of the Desert: Early Aboriginal Paintings from Papunya. Organized by the Herbert F. Johnson Museum of Art at Cornell University
- 2011: Art/Memory/Place: Commemorating the Triangle Shirtwaist Factory Fire
- 2012: Jesús Rafael Soto: Paris and Beyond, 1950–1970
- 2012: Toxic Beauty: The Art of Frank Moore. Organized by the Grey Art Gallery and presented at the Grey Art Gallery and Fales Library
- 2015: Abby Grey and Indian Modernism: Selections from the NYU Art Collection
- 2015: Tseng Kwong Chi: Performing for the Camera. Co-organized by the Grey Art Gallery and the Chrysler Museum of Art, Norfolk, Virginia.
- 2016: Global/Local 1960–2015: Six Artists from Iran
- 2017: Inventing Downtown: Artist-Run Galleries in New York City, 1952–1965
- 2018: The Beautiful Brain: The Drawings of Santiago Ramón y Cajal. Organized by the Weisman Art Museum at the University of Minnesota in collaboration with the Cajal Institute, Spain
- 2019: Art after Stonewall, 1969–1989. Organized by the Columbus Museum of Art, Columbus, Ohio
- 2019: Modernisms: Iranian, Turkish, and Indian Highlights from NYU's Abby Weed Grey Collection
- 2020: Taking Shape: Abstraction from the Arab World, 1950s–1980s. Co-curated with the Barjeel Art Foundation, Sharjah, UAE.
- 2024: Americans in Paris: Artists Working in Postwar France, 1946–1962, March 2, 2024 – July 20, 2024
- 2024: Make Way for Berthe Weill: Art Dealer of the Parisian Avant-Garde, October 1, 2024 – March 1, 2025. Co-organized by Grey Art Museum, the Montreal Museum of Fine Arts (exhibited May 10 – September 7, 2025), and the Musée de l’Orangerie (exhibited October 8, 2025 – January 26, 2026).

== Awards ==
- 1991 Alfred H. Barr Jr. Award for "Success is a Job in New York": The Early Art and Business of Andy Warhol, Carnegie Museum of Art, Pittsburgh, and Grey Art Gallery, New York University, New York, on view at the Grey March 14–April 29, 1989
- 1997 AICA (The United States Section of the International Association of Art Critics) award for Shiro Kuramata 1934–1991, on view February 25–May 2, 1998 (Best Design Show)
- 1999 AICA (The United States Section of the International Association of Art Critics) award for Inverted Odysseys: Claude Cahun, Maya Deren, Cindy Sherman, on view November 16, 1999 – January 29, 2000 (Best Photography Show)
- 2007 AICA (The United States Section of the International Association of Art Critics) award for The Downtown Show: The New York Art Scene, 1974–1984, Grey Art Gallery and Fales Library, New York University, New York, on view January 10–April 1, 2006 (Best Thematic Museum Show in New York City)
- 2007 Village Voice Best of NYC award (Best Didactic Gallery)
- 2012 AICA (The United States Section of the International Association of Art Critics) award for The Poetics of Cloth: African Textiles / Recent Art, on view September 16–December 6, 2008 (Best Show in University Gallery)
- 2012 AICA (The United States Section of the International Association of Art Critics) award for Toxic Beauty: The Art of Frank Moore, on view September 6–December 8, 2012 (Best Show in a University Gallery)
- 2017 the Alice Award administered by Furthermore grants in publishing, a program of the J. M. Kaplan Fund, for Inventing Downtown: Artist-Run Galleries in New York City, 1952-1965 by Melissa Rachleff, co-published by the Grey Art Gallery and DelMonico Books*Prestel Publishing. (The Alice Short List)

== Directors ==
- Robert R. Littman, 1976–1983
- Thomas Sokolowski, 1984–1996
- Lynn Gumpert, 1997–April 2025
- Alison Weaver, May 26, 2026–present
