= Morteza Momayez =

Iranian graphic designer (1936–2005)

- مرتضی ممیز
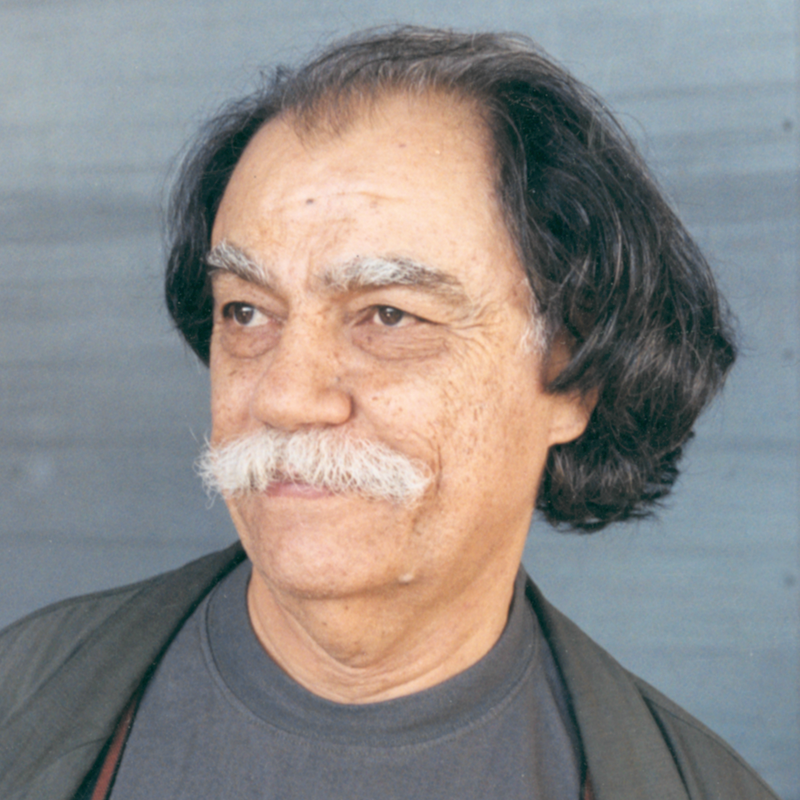
- Born: 26 August 1936; Tehran, Imperial State of Iran
- Died: 25 October 2005 (aged 69); Tehran, Iran
- Education: Faculty of Fine Arts in University of Tehran, 1964. École nationale supérieure des arts décoratifs, 1968.

Signature
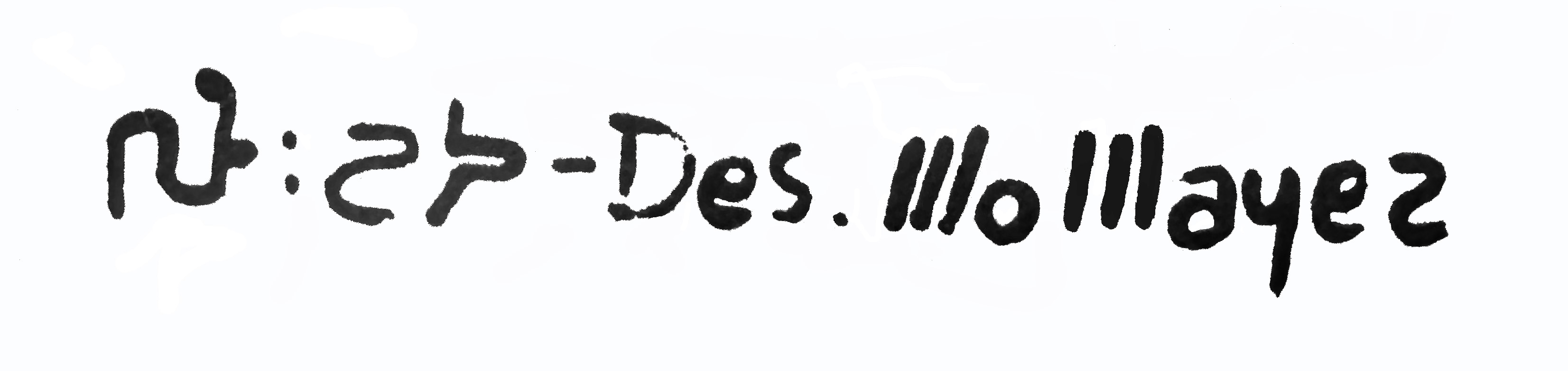

Morteza Momayez (Persian: مرتضی ممیز; 26 August 1936 – 25 October 2005), known as the 'Father of Iranian Graphic Design', was one of the founders of the Iranian Graphic Design Society (IGDS) and held a membership to Alliance Graphique Internationale (AGI). He was the president of Tehran International Poster Biennial and Editor-in-chief of “Neshan”. Throughout his career, Momayez initiated many cultural institutes, exhibitions and graphic design publications. In 2004, Momayez received the Art & Culture Award of Excellency from President Mohammad Khatami.

== Biography ==
Nocturnal Letter by Mohammad Zohari cover design by Morteza Momayez

Morteza Momayez was born on 26 August 1936, in Tehran to Mohammad-Ali and Kochak Momayez.

In 1965, he completed his undergraduate studies in painting at the University of Tehran's College of Fine Arts. He subsequently continued his studies at École Nationale Supérieure des Arts Décoratifs in Paris, where he received his diplomat in 1968. He served as the art director and graphic designer for the Tehran International Film Festival between 1973 and 1977.

Experiences: Graphic Design Magazines: Iran Abad (1960), Ketab va Keyhan Hafteh (1961–62), Farhang (1961), Kavosh (1963–64), Negin (1965), Farhang va Zendegi (1969–78), Roudaki (1971-1978), Cinema (1974–75), Memari va Honareh Iran (1987), Kelk (1990-), Neghahe No (1991–99), Sharif (1993-2001), Tasvir (1992), Silk Road (1994–95), Faslnameh Khavarmyaneh (1994), Goftego (1994-), Payam-e-Emrouz (1994–2000). Tehran (Iran)-the father of Iranian Graphic Design, Morteza Momayez died on Friday, 25 November.

== Awards ==
- 2004 National Award of Art achievements from the Academy of Art in Tehran.
