= Noureddin Zarrinkelk =

Iranian animator, author and illustrator

- نورالدين زرين‌کلک
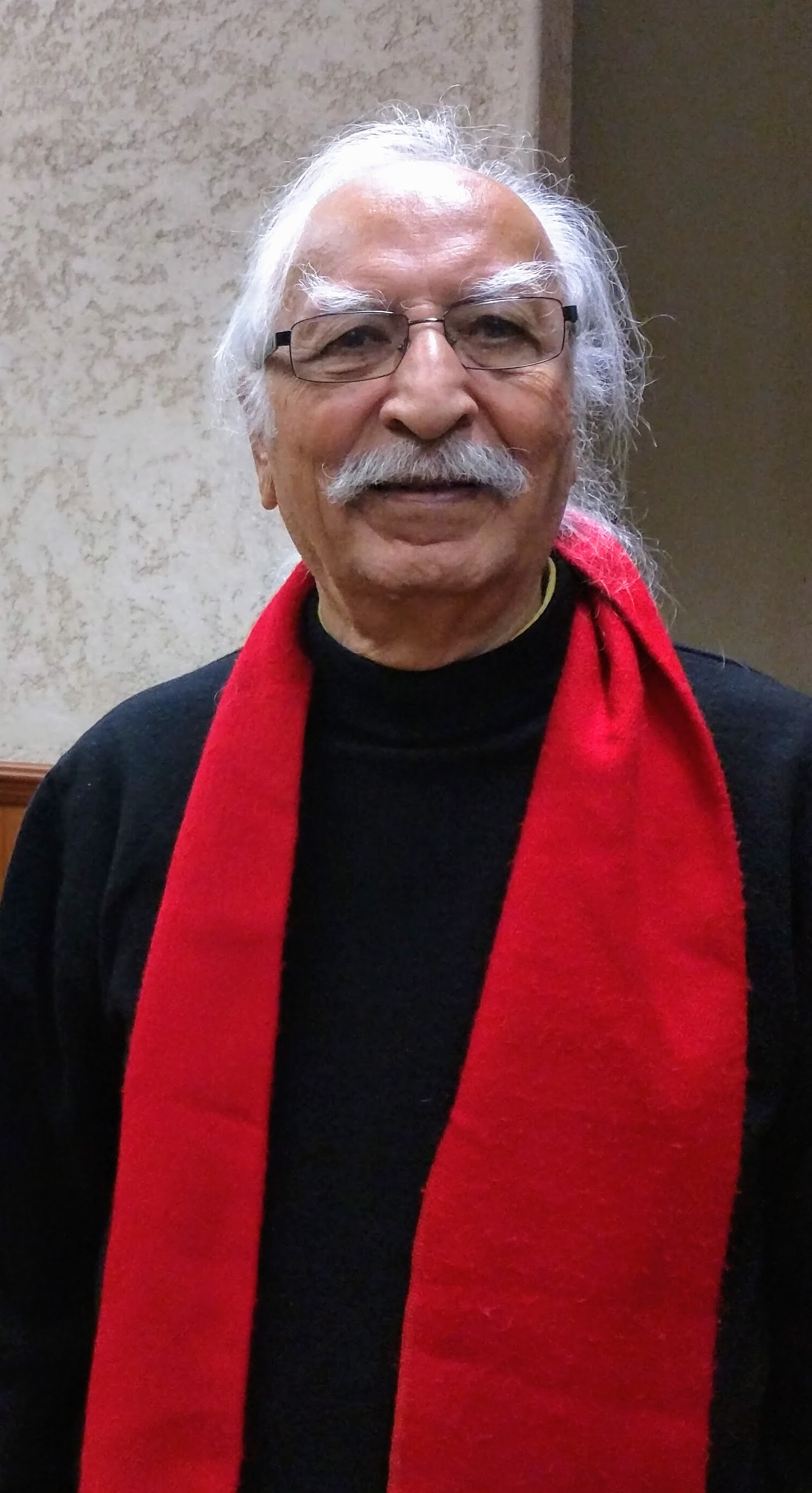
- Born: 9 April 1937 (age 89); Mashhad, Iran
- Other names: Noureddin Zarrin-Kelk, Nouri Zarrin-Kelk, Noori Zarrin-Kelk
- Education: Royal Academy of Fine Arts (Antwerp), Tehran University
- Occupations: Animator, Director, Illustrator and University Professor
- Website: https://www.nzarrinkelk.com

Noureddin Zarrinkelk (Persian: نورالدین زرین‌کلک; b. 9 April 1937, in Mashhad), also spelled Zarrin-Kelk, also known as Noori or Nouri, is an Iranian animator, concept artist, editor, graphic designer, illustrator, layout artist, photographer, script writer, educator, and sculptor.

== Biography ==
Zarrinkelk studied pharmacy at Tehran University, where he earned a PharmD. Later, from 1969 to 1972, he studied animation film at the Royal Academy of Fine Arts (KASK) under Raoul Servais.

He established the first school of animation in Iran, which later merged with the prestigious Faculty of Fine Arts at Tehran University. He continued to serve as a professor of animation and graphic arts well into his retirement.

Since 1971, Zarrinkelk has been a jury member at various international animation festivals and illustration biennials. In 2003, his peers elected him as the president of ASIFA (Association Internationale du Film d'Animation).

Zarrinkelk is recognized as the father of animation in Iran.

== Influence ==
The art of animation as practised in modern day Iran started in 1950s. Iran's animation owes largely to Noureddin Zarrinkelk. Zarrinkelk played a crucial role in founding the Institute for Intellectual Development of Children and Young Adults (IIDCYA) in Tehran in collaboration with the father of Iranian graphics Morteza Momayez and fellow artists Farshid Mesghali, Ali Akbar Sadeghi and Arabik Baghdasarian, among others.

== Education ==
- Puppet Film; “Jiri Trnka” Studios; Prag 1975
- Animation Film; “Royal Academy Of Fine Arts” Belgium 1969-1972
- Miniature (Persian Traditional Painting) School; Tehran 1950’s
- PhD Pharmacy; Tehran University 1955-1962

== Films ==
- In the U.N.; Writer, Designer & Director (Under Production)
- Pood; Writer, Designer & Director 2000
- Identity (For UNICEF); Writer, Designer & Director 1999
- Moscow; (Mouse & Cow) Writer, Designer & Director 1998
- Sinbad; (Full length animated feature) Stylist, Director 1987-1991 (Hollywood)
- Super Powers; Writer, Designer & Director 1982
- A Way To Neighbor; Writer, Designer & Director 1978
- Amir Hamza the Lover and the Dancing Zebra; Writer, Designer & Director 1977
- The Mad, Mad, Mad World; Writer, Designer & Director 1975
- Atal-Matal; Writer, Designer & Director 1974
- Association Of Ideas; Writer, Designer & Director 1973
- Philipo and a Train from Hong Kong; Director 1971 (Belgium)
- A Playground for Baboush; Writer, Designer & Director 1971 (Belgium)
- Duty, First; Designer & Director 1970 (Belgium)

== Publications ==
- Rumi’s Stories, Illustrations (under Publication)
- Prince Arsalan, Illustrations 2005
- Mullah Nasruddin, Illustrations 2005
- The Elephant and the Ant, Text & illustration 2005
- In the U.N.; Text & Illustration 2005
- From the waters; Text & Illustration 1996
- Multi-Job Factory; Text & Illustration 1988
- A-B-Zoo; Text & Illustration 1986
- Medical Publications (700 Title); Design & Illustration 1984-1985
- If I were God; Text & Illustration 1983
- When I was a Kid; Text (Illustrations by Zarrinkelk Junior) 1981
- Story of the Silk Worm; Text & Illustrations 1979
- Cyrus the King; Illustrations 1977
- Albino and the Princess; Illustrations 1976
- Folk Tales From Asia; Issue 1-3 Illustrations 1975
- New Year’s Day and the Kites; Illustrations 1974
- Story of the Carpet Flowers; Illustrations 1973
- Albini and the Sphinx; Illustrations 1972
- The Crows; Illustrations 1968
- Hero “Amir-Hamzeh”; Illustrations 1967
- The Myth of the Sphinx; Illustrations 1965
- Iran, Crossroad of Caravans; Illustrations 1964
- Text Book For Schools (Grade 1 to 4); Illustrations 1960-1970
- Various Newspapers; Graphics, Illustrations, Caricatures 1950-1960

== Other activities ==
- President of ASIFA international Association of Animated Film since November 2003
- Member of the board of directors of ASIFA* International, 1988–2000
- Founder and President of ASIFA* Iran since 1986
- Founder and Teacher of Animation, Post Graduate School, “Farabi” Art University, Tehran 1977-1996
- Founder and Teacher of the first Animation School, Tehran 1974-1977
- Member of ASIFA International since 1971
- Jury Member of various international animation festival and illustration Biennales since 1975

== Awards ==
- Permanent resident, Association International du Film d’Animation.
- Hans Christian Andersen Life Achievement for children books
- Jewell of the Century, Annecy International Film Festival, France 2000, for “The Mad, Mad, Mad World”
- Collection Tokyo Museum of Illustration, Japan 2000, for “Mullah Nasruddin”
- Jury’s special award Tehran International Biennial, Iran 1999, for “Mullah Nasruddin”
- Jury’s special award Tehran International Film Festival, Iran 1989, for “Supper Powers”
- Special Mention, Bologna Book Exhibition, Italy 1987, for “A-B-Zoo”
- Diploma Of Honor, Hans Christian Andersen Jury For Lifetime Achievement 1984
- Diploma of Honor, Giffoni International Film Festival, Italy for “Prince Hamzeh” 1978
- Diploma Of Honor, Paris International Short Film Festival for “the Mad, Mad, Mad World” 1977
- First Prize for Subject, Oberhausen International Film Festival 1977, for “the Mad, Mad, Mad World” 1977
- Plate of Honour, “Cairo International Film Festival” Egypt for “the Mad, Mad, Mad World” 1977
- Silver Prize, Espinho International Film Festival, Portugal, for “the Mad, Mad, Mad World” 1977
- Diploma of Honor, Chicago International Film Festival 1976
- First Prize for Subject, Saloniki Film Festival, Greece, for “the Mad, Mad, Mad World” 1977
- Diploma of Honor, San Francisco International Film Festival, for Association of Ideas 1975
- Best Book of the year, “IBBY Iran”, for “When I was a kid” 1975
- Prix Clothide Coupie, Belgium National Film Festival 1973, for “Duty, First”
- Prize for Schools, Annecy International Film Festival, France, 1969, for “Duty, First”
- Golden Apple, Biennial of Illustration Bratislava, Slovakia 1971, for “The Crows”
- Best Book of the year, “UNESCO International”, Tokyo, Japan 1970, for “The Crows”
- Best Book of the year, “UNESCO Iran”, for “The Crows” 1970
- Plate of Honor, IBBY Iran, for “Myth of the Sphinx” 1969

== See also ==
- Iranian modern art
- History of Iranian animation
- Famous names in animation
- History of animation
