= Iranian animation =

The history of Iranian animation, which began in its modern form in the mid 20th century in Iran, can also be traced back to the Bronze Age.

== History ==
=== Early history ===
Animation of drawing on a pottery vessel found in Shahr-e Sookhteh, now in the National Museum of Iran.

The history of animation in Iran can be dated back to the Bronze Age. A 5,200 year old earthenware goblet discovered in Burnt City in Sistan and Baluchestan Province, southeastern Iran, depicts a series of drawings of a goat that jumps toward a tree and eats its leaves, however the original evidence is only a storyboard of it, but when combined in a running film, it produces an animation. Similar forms of pottery with sequential pictures can also be found throughout medieval Islamic Persia. Such drawings are early examples of precursors to the history of animation in general.

=== Modern day ===
The art of animation as practiced in modern-day Iran started in the 1950s. Iran's animation owes largely to the animator Noureddin Zarrinkelk, who was instrumental in founding the Institute for Intellectual Development of Children and Young Adults (IIDCYA) in Tehran in collaboration with the late father of Iranian graphics, Morteza Momayez, and other fellow artists like Farshid Mesghali, Ali Akbar Sadeghi, and Arapik Baghdasarian.

Iranian animation has found international reputation. The Iranian animated film The Hole made by Vahid Nasirian and produced by the Experimental and Documentary Film Center was awarded second prize at the 19th Odense International Film Festival, Denmark in 2004.

==== Support from the Leader of Iran ====
“According to the statement of Mohammad Reza Mokhbar Dezfuli, former Secretary of the Supreme Council of the Cultural Revolution, the Leader of the Islamic Revolution has emphasized the development of the animation industry in Iran since the mid-1980s. These strategic statements have led to the formation of hundreds of companies active in the field of animation in the following years, making Iran one of the leading countries in the region in the field of animation.”

== Notable animated films ==
- 1970: Duty, First
- 1970: The Weightlifter
- 1971: A Playground for Baboush
- 1971: Philipo and a Train from Hong Kong
- 1971: Seven Cities
- 1972: Shower of Flowers
- 1973: Association Of Ideas
- 1973: I Am He Who…
- 1974: Atal-Matal
- 1974: The Castle
- 1975: Crazy, Crazy, Crazy World
- 1975: The Man and the Cloud
- 1975: The Sun King
- 1977: Amir Hamzeh
- 1982: One, Two, Three, More
- 2007: A la Mode
- 2023: In the Shadow of the Cypress
- 2024: Babai Ghahraman

== Tehran International Animation Festival ==
Tehran International Animation Festival was established in February 2000. The festival was aimed to bring together Iranian and foreign animators and animation films and providing a showcase for unknown potentials of this type of cinema. 896 films from Iran and 32 other countries applied for participation in the festival, of which 488 titles were selected for screening during the four days of the event. Other highlights of the first edition of the Festival were special screenings dedicated to commemoration of well-known Russian animator Feodor Khitrouk and Esfandiar Ahmadieh (known as the Father of Iranian animation cinema), who were themselves present in the event, as well as exhibition of animation films of Studio Pannonia of Hungary, ASIFA of South Korea, and works from Czech Republic, Slovakia, Hungary, Yugoslavia and Russia. Retrospectives of works of Bruno Bozzetto and Ali Akbar Sadeghi and screening of student animation films were other sections of the festival. The festival also paid homage to Jean-Luc Xiberras whose name is interwoven with Annecy Festival.

Films shown at the 5th festival (2007) included Hayao Miyazaki's Howl's Moving Castle, Alexander Petrov's My Love, Georges Schwizgebel's Jeu and Torill Kove's Oscar-winning The Danish Poet.

Other notable films shown in the festival's history included Birthday Boy which won the award for Best Film in the International section.

== See also ==
- Iranian cinema
