= Khanate Mansion of Amin Islami =

Historic site in Nishapur, Iran

Khanate Mansion and Garden of Amin Islami
- باغ و عمارت امین اسلامی
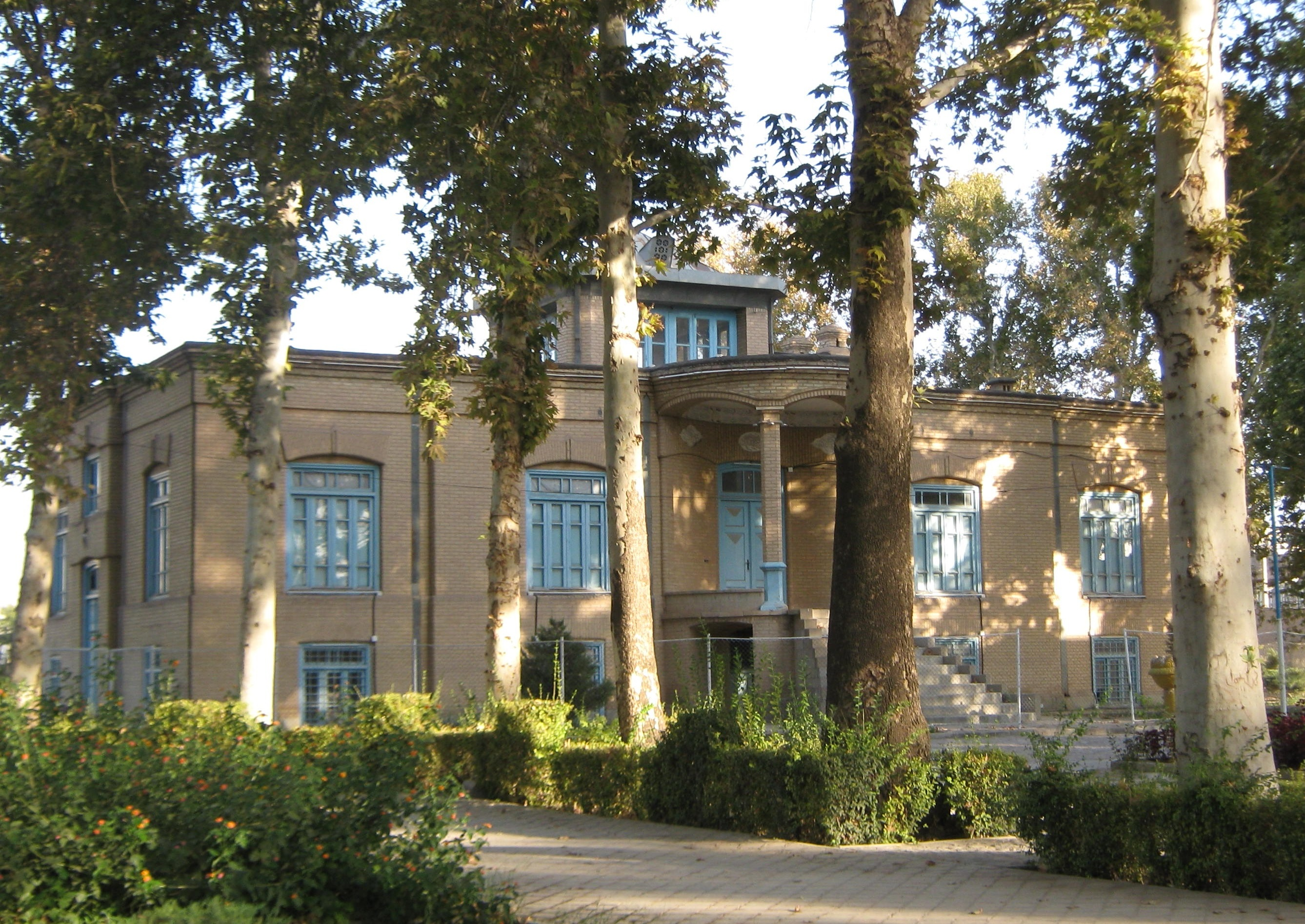
- Front view of the mansion in 2015
- Interactive map of the Khanate Mansion and Garden of Amin Islami area

General information
- Status: Open to the public
- Type: Mansion and Persian style garden
- Architectural style: Persian architecture
- Location: Nishapur, Razavi Khorasan Province, Iran
- Coordinates: 36.210°N 58.791°E

The Khanate Mansion and Garden of Amin Islami (or simply referred to as: Khanate Mansion of Amin Islami, or Mansion of Amin Islami; Persian: عمارت و باغ امین اسلامی) is a historic Pahlavi era building and garden in Nishapur, Iran. It is part of the Iranian national heritage list with the registration number of 4809.

This mansion has been the personal home of one of the khans of Nishapur, named Amin Islami, in the Pahlavi era. This mansion along with its garden are now used as a public space. This mansion is located within one of the busiest areas of the city and is close to the downtown of Nishapur. Another historical garden/park is located in front of the southern section of this garden which with the name of Baghmeli of Nishapur (Persian:باغ ملی نیشابور) or literally "The national garden of Nishapur".

This mansion/garden along with the Baghmeli of Nishapur is situated next to a hospital and several commercial centers, restaurants, cafes and two hotels.

== Gallery ==
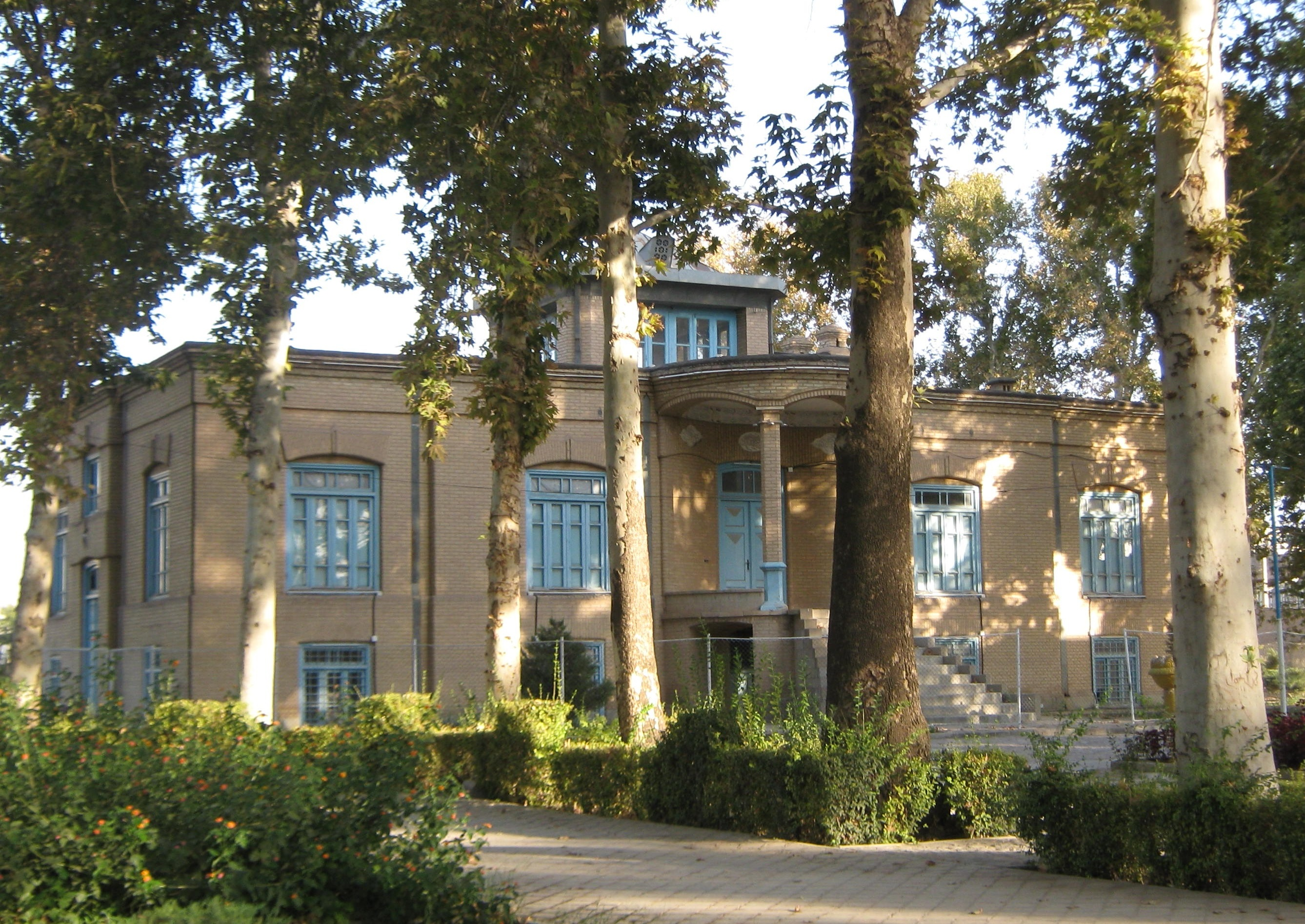
Front view of the mansion

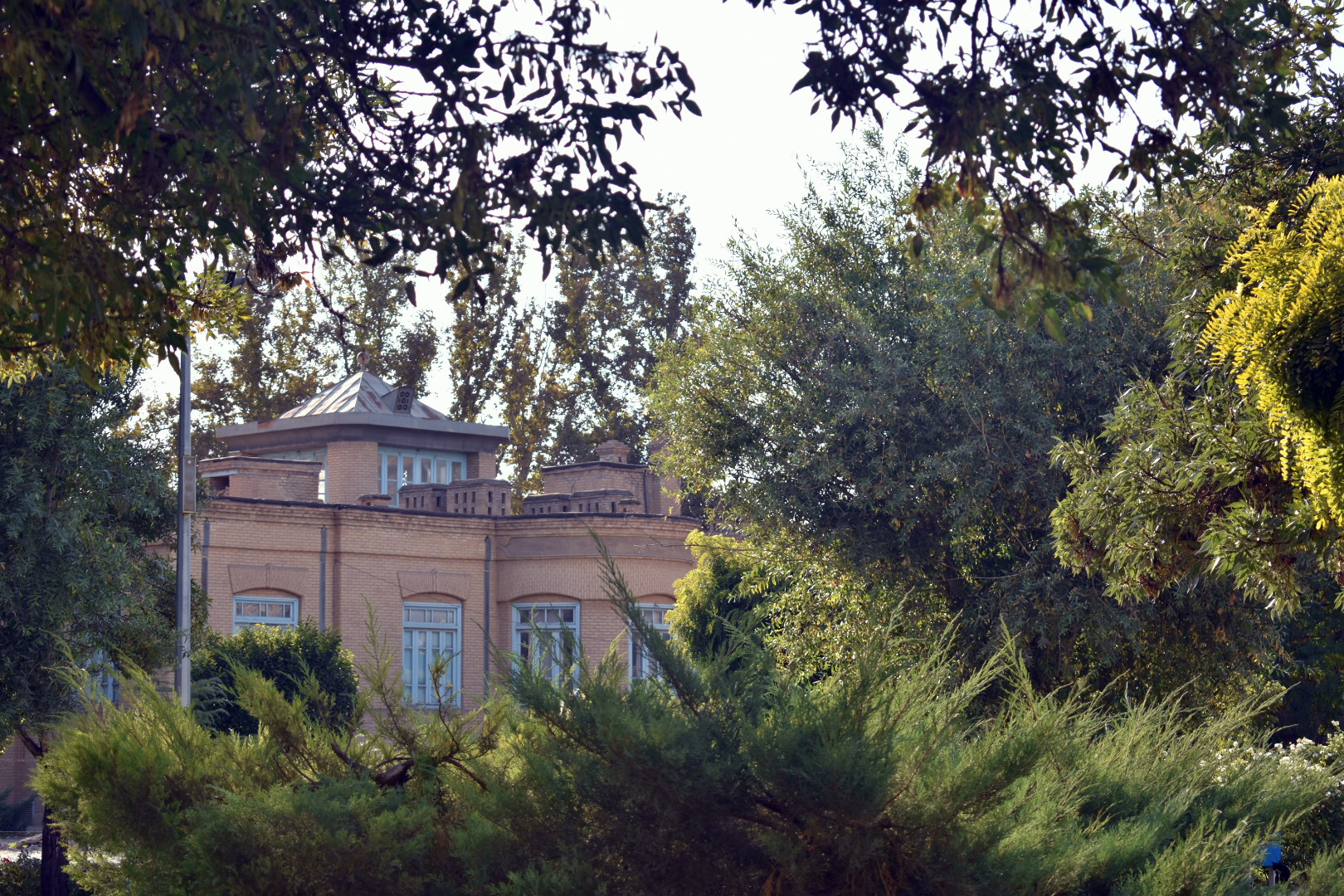

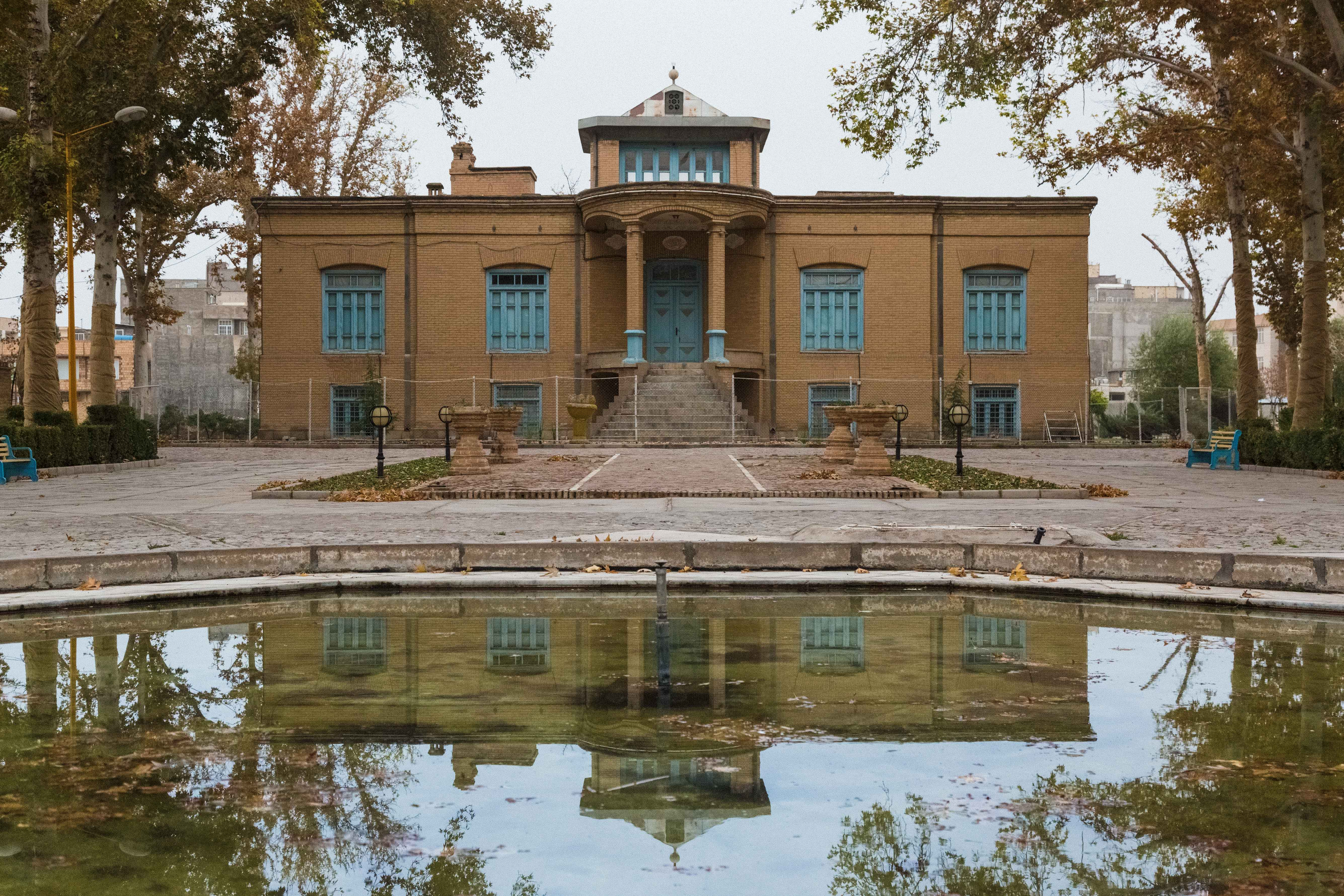

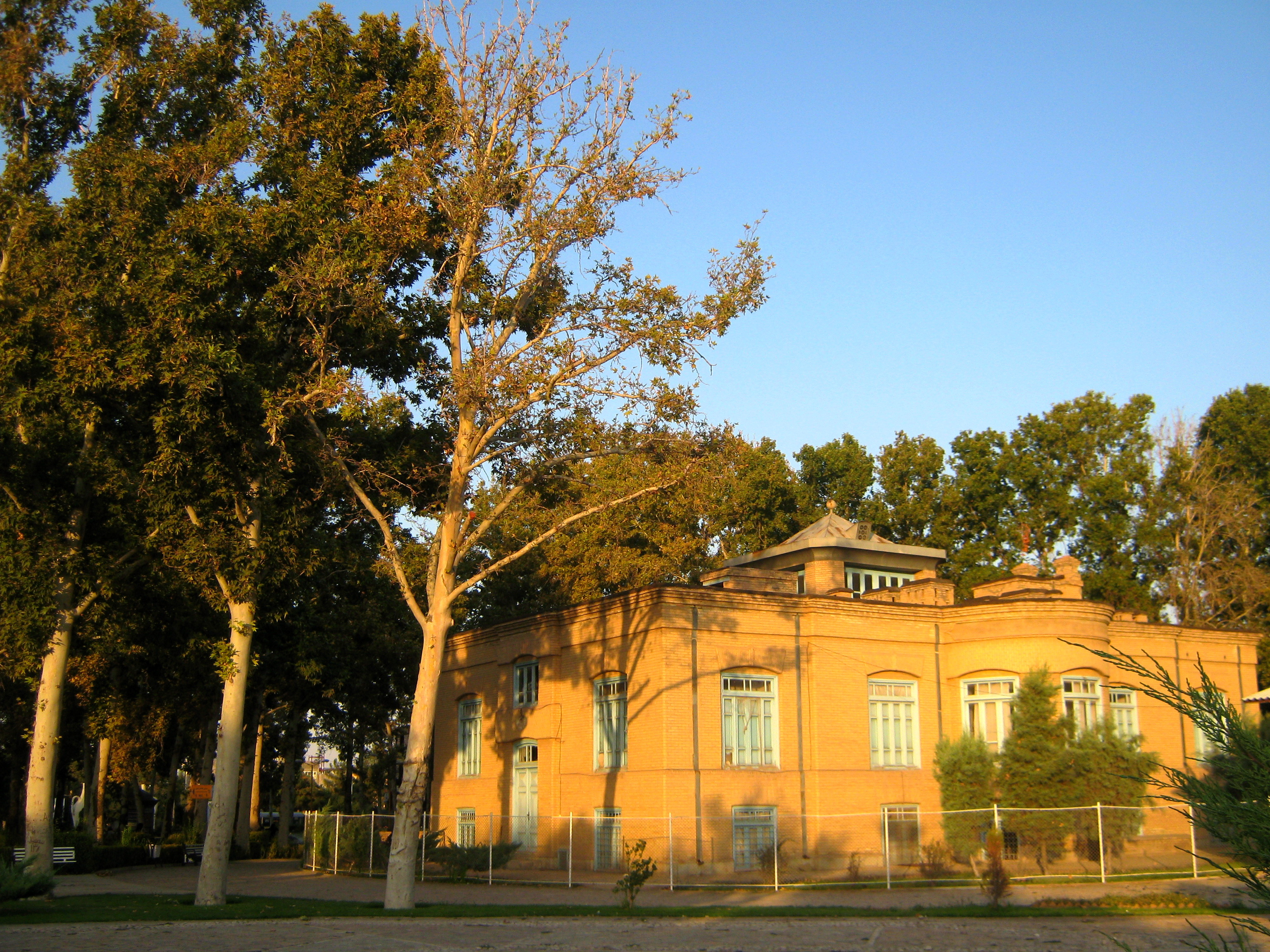
The view of the mansion from its back.

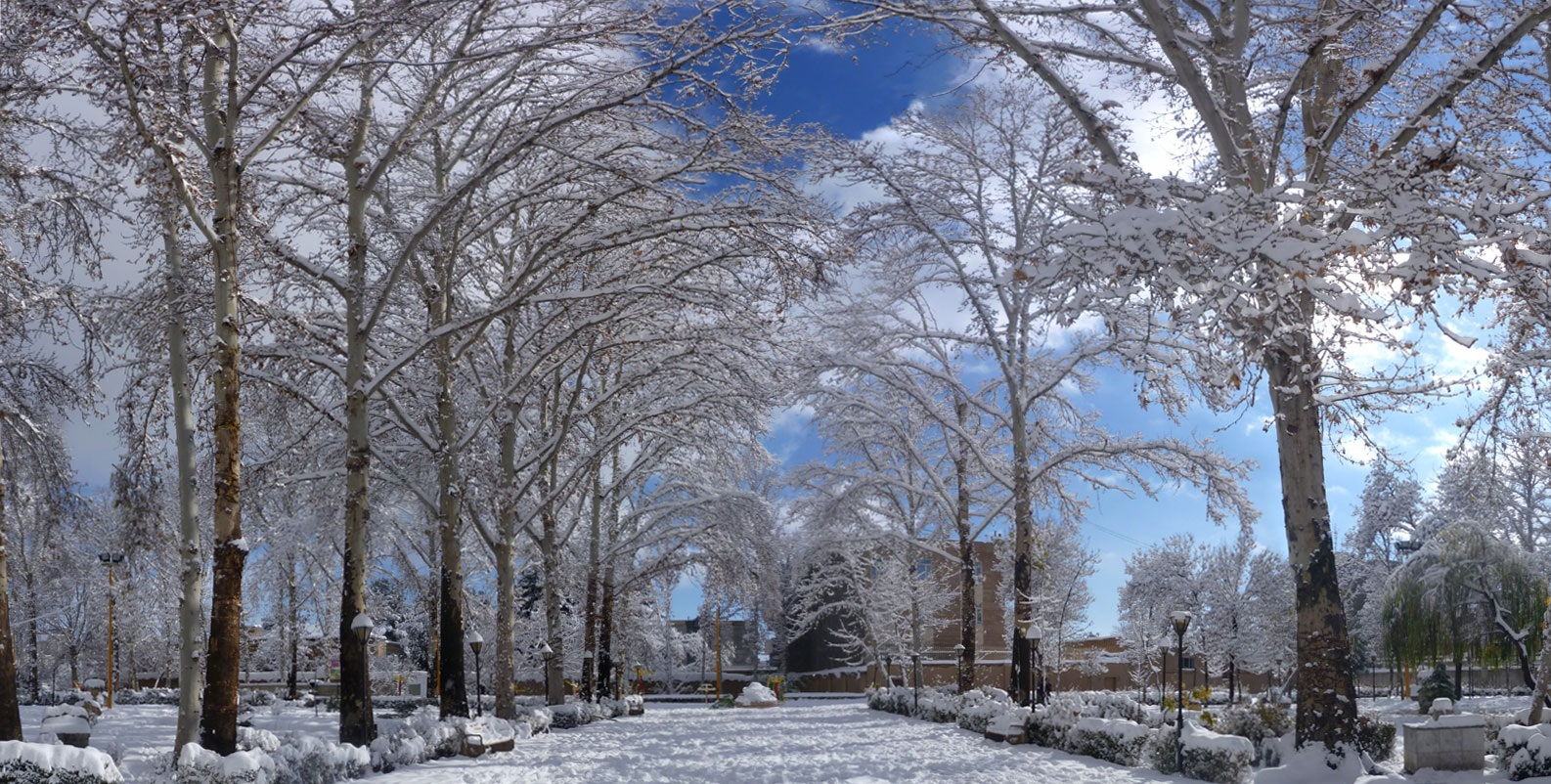

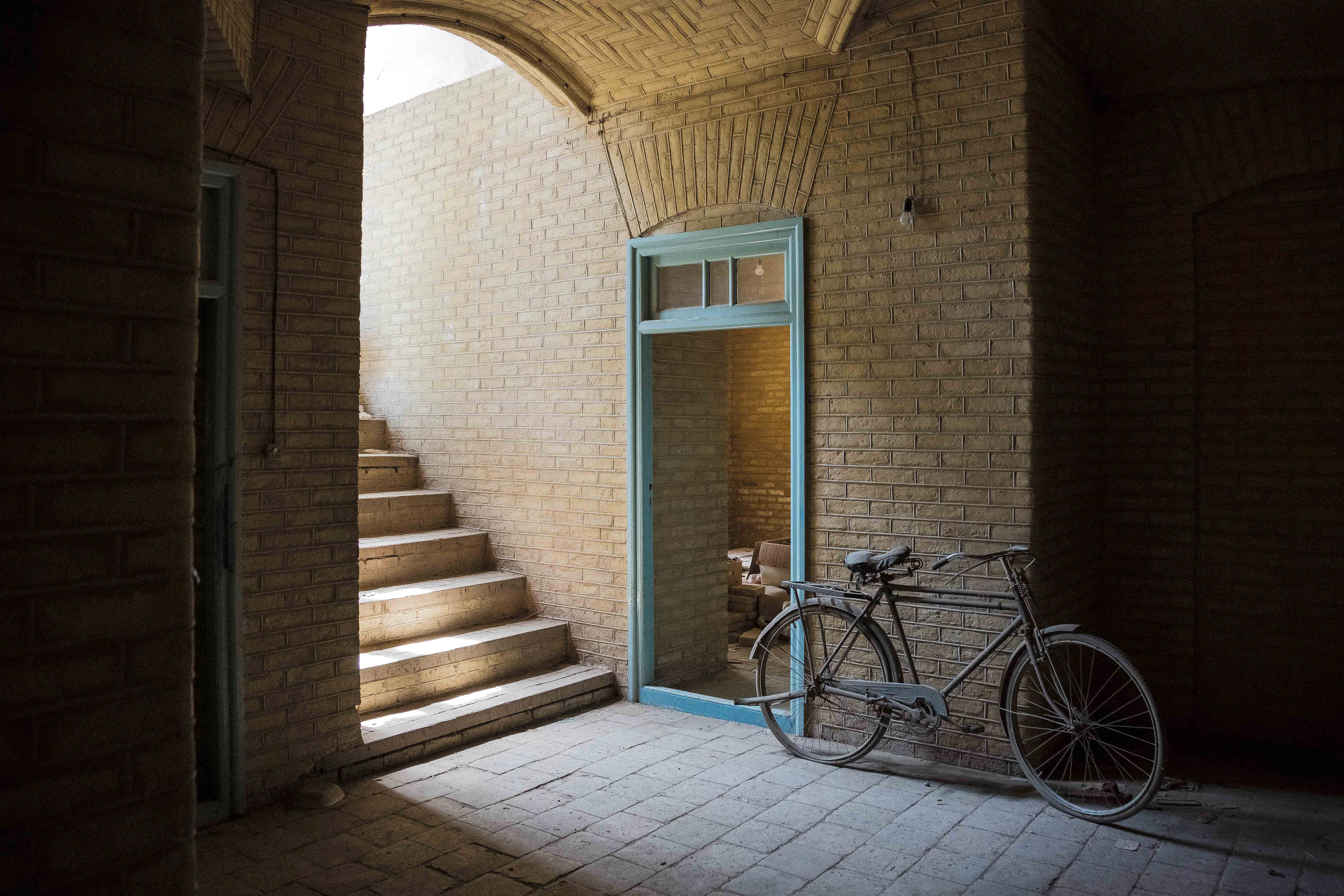

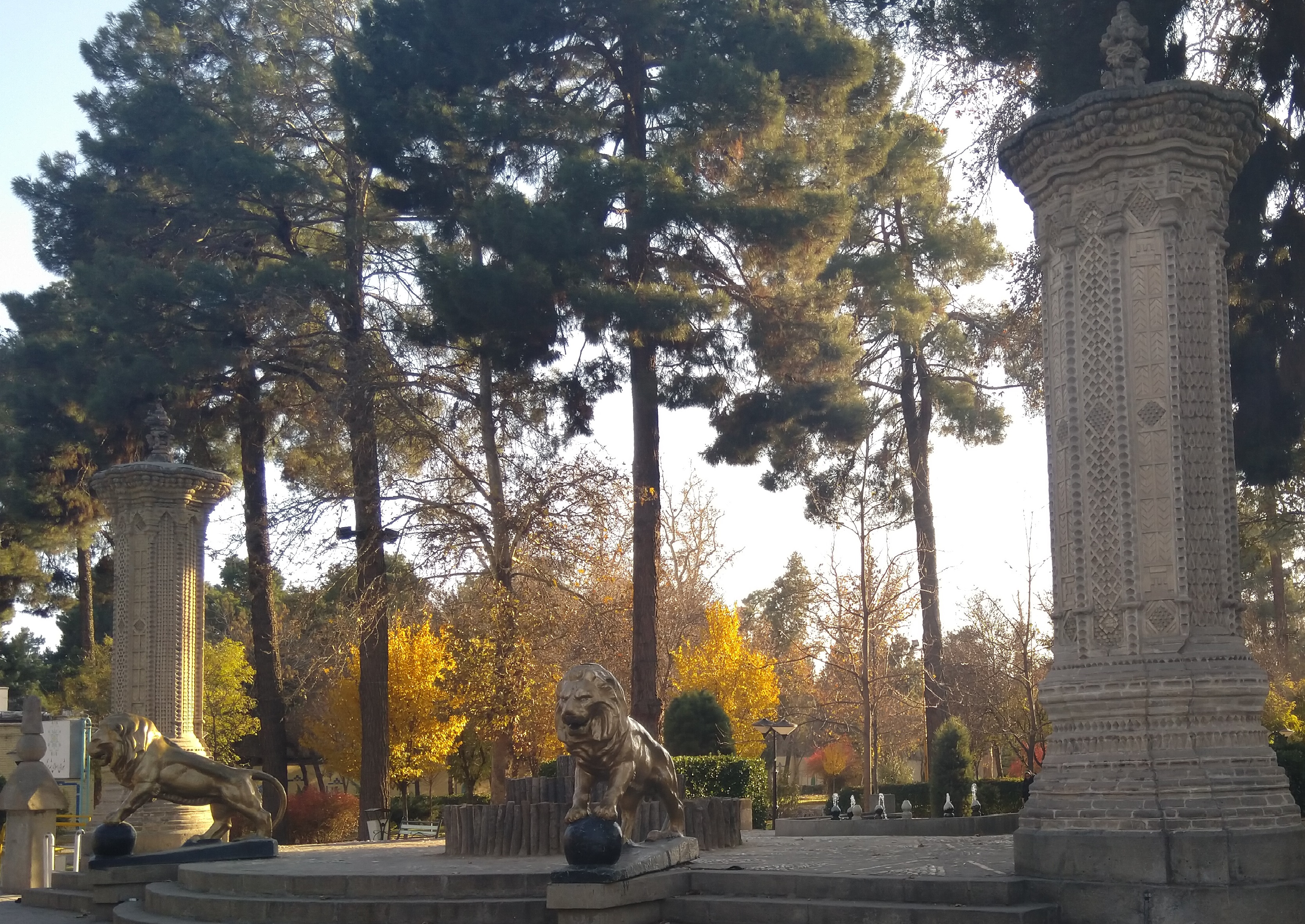
Entrance of Baghmeli which is close to the southern section of the Amin Islami Garden.
