= Shun Sugata =

Japanese actor

- Born: February 17, 1955 (age 71); Fujiyoshida, Yamanashi, Japan
- Occupation: Actor
- Years active: 1980–present

Shun Sugata (菅田 俊, Sugata Shun; born February 17, 1955) is a Japanese actor.

== Early life ==
Sugata was born in Yamanashi Prefecture.

== Career ==
He starred in the 2006 film Confessions of a Dog.

He appeared in Amir Naderi's 2011 film Cut.

== Filmography ==
=== Film ===
- Seiha (1982), Nakahara
- Theater of Life (1983), Student
- Kita no hotaru (1984)
- Abunai Deka (1987)
- Korogashi Ryota: Gekitotsu! Monster bus (1988), Hyodo
- Baka Yaro! 2: Shiawase ni Naritai (1989)
- Water Moon (1989), Kuribayashi
- Fûsen (1990), Hayato Yoshioka
- Shishiohtachi no natsu (1991)
- Dance Till Tomorrow (1991)
- Blowback 2 (1991), Ratts
- Funky Monkey Teacher 2 (1992), Sugimoto
- Funky Monkey 2 (1992)
- Anego - Gokudô wo aishita onna: Kiriko (1993), Jin
- Toei Hero Daishugo (1994)
- Escape Imprisonment 5: Obscene Flesh Hunt (1995)
- Shabu gokudo (1996), Ryo Kano
- Organ (1996), Naka Nishi
- Ikasetai onna (1996)
- Heat After Dark (1996)
- Kawaki no machi (1997)
- Fukushu the Revenge Kienai Kizuato (1997), Toshiaki Yoshioka
- Koi to Hanabi to Kanransha (1997)
- Kumo no hitomi (1998), Hinuma
- Joker (1998), Kurokawa
- Shura ga Yuku (1998)
- Yomigaeru Kintarou (1998)
- License to Live (1998), Shinichirô Yoshii
- Blood (1998), Sniper Team Captain
- Shin karajishi kabushiki kaisha (1999)
- Ley Lines (1999), Cop
- Kyôhan (1999), Tadokoro
- Taboo (1999)
- Tomie: Replay (2000), Kenzo Morita
- Kurayami no rekuiemu (2000), Kumicho (Head of yakuza)
- Pulse (2001), Boss
- Ichi the Killer (2001), Takayama
- Momantai 2 (2002), Kazuo Ota
- Graveyard of Honor (2002), Toshi Nishizaki
- Gun Crazy: A Woman from Nowhere (2002)
- Alive (2002), Matsuda
- Kyoki no Sakura (2002)
- Buyûden (2003)
- Kill Bill: Volume 1 (2003), Boss Benta
- The Last Samurai (2003), Nakao
- Heat (2004, part 1, 2), Fujimaki
- Kill Bill: Volume 2 (2004), Boss Benta
- Kill Bill: The Whole Bloody Affair (2004), Boss Benta
- Marebito (2004), MIB
- Izo (2004)
- [Is A.] (2004), Mamoru Hanamura
- Tsukineko ni mitsu no tama (2004), Oiwake
- Satsujin Net (2004)
- Lady Joker (2004), Detective Anzai
- Ghost Shout (2004)
- Gokudou no Onna Tachi (2005)
- TKO Hip Hop (2005)
- Ikusa (2005)
- Onaji tsuki wo miteiru (2005)
- Shisso (2005), Shuji's Father
- Aishiteyo (2005)
- Confessions of a Dog (2006), Takeda
- Koi suru inosento man (2006)
- Dororo (2007), Hibukuro
- Tonari Machi Sensou (2007), Mayor of Maisaka
- Kôan keisatsu sôsakan (2007)
- Zero Woman (2007)
- Konjaku monogatari: The new edition (2007)
- Glory to the Filmmaker! (2007)
- Tôchika (2007)
- Grow (2007), Tetsuharu Sato
- Captain (2007)
- Namida tsubo (2008), Shugo
- Dâku rabu: Rape (2008)
- Chikyû de tatta futari (2008)
- Sekai de ichiban utsukushii yoru (2008), Hara
- Tokyo Gore Police (2008), TOKYO POLICE Commissioner General
- Sakigake!! Otokojuku (2008)
- Johnen: Sada no ai (2008)
- Kyûka (2008), Fumio Sakamoto
- Chameleon (2008)
- Inju: The Beast in the Shadow (2008), Inspecteur Fuji
- Zen (2009), Kônin
- Yôjû mameshiba (2009)
- Kanikôsen (2009), Field Officer
- Hakujitsumu (2009)
- Ballad: Na mo naki koi no uta (2009), Assistant Professor Yi
- Wangan Midnight The Movie (2009), Kuro
- The Unbroken (2009), Tatsuro Shikata
- Abashiri ikka: The Movie (2009)
- Tochka (2009)
- Ranningu on enputi (2010), Hideji's Father
- Lost & Found (2010)
- Rosuto kuraimu: Senkô (2010), Bunpei Shishikura
- Awaremi mumashika (2010), Nishimura Katsuhiko
- Bunraku (2010), Uncle
- Hevunzu sutôrî (2010)
- Strangers in the City (2010), Yukio Ohmori
- Heaven's Story (2010)
- Abe Sada: Saigo no nanokakan (2011), Officer Urakawa
- Cut (2011), Masaki
- Dirty Hearts (2011), Sasaki
- Donzumari benki (2012), Aoki
- Playback (2012)
- Outrage Beyond (2012), Okamoto
- Haha no uta ga kikoeru (2013)
- Ninja: Shadow of a Tear (2013), Goro
- Tokyo Bitch, I Love You (2013)
- Heisei Riders vs. Shōwa Riders: Kamen Rider Taisen feat. Super Sentai (2014), Ryo Murasame / Kamen Rider ZX / Ambassador Darkness
- Washi to taka (2014)
- Genge (2014)
- 25 (2014)
- Bad Moon Rising (2015)
- Zutaboro (2015)
- Gonin Saga (2015), Yuzuru Matsuura
- 64: Part I (2016), Police Station Chief Urushibara
- Conflict: Saidai no kôsô (2016), Otani
- 64: Part II (2016), Head of Precinct, Urushibara
- Taiyô no futa (2016)
- Tatara Samurai (2016)
- Silence (2016), Samurai Commander
- Butterfly Sleep (2017), Ayamine Ryuji
- Vigilante (2017)
- Roupeiro no Yūutsu (2018), Prison Warden
- Black Crow 1 (2019), Kanai
- Black Crow 2 (2019), Kanai
- A Family (2021), Makoto Takeda
- The Supporting Actors: The Movie (2021), Himself
- Tomorrow's Dinner Table (2021), Tsuneo Fujisaki
- Just Remembering (2022)
- The Setting Sun (2022)
- The Parades (2024)
- Welcome Back (2025)
- Fake Out (2025)
- Kaneko Fumiko: Because I Wanted to (2026)
- Silent Night (2025), Keizo
- Love Me Kill Me (2026)

=== Television ===
- Birth of the 10th! Kamen Riders All Together!! (1984, TV movie), Ryo Murasame / Kamen Rider ZX
- Kekko Kamen 3 (1993, Video)
- Tokusou Robo Janperson (1993–1994), Ryuzaburou Tatewaki / Bill Goldy
- Juukou B-Fighter (1995–1996)
- Be-Bop High School (1996–1998), Ryuzaburou Tatewaki
- Shizuka naru Don (1997)
- Nanbakinyuuden Minami no Teio (1998)
- Ore no Sora (1998)
- Engine Sentai Go-onger (2008), Gang Father
- Tenchijin (2009), Shibata Katsuie
- Fuller House (????), "The Dragon" (episode: "My Best Friend's Japanese Wedding")
- Taira no Kiyomori (2012), Miura Yoshiaki
- Ishitsubute (2017)
- The Supporting Actors 2 (2018)
- Tokyo Vice (2022), Ishida
- Happy Kanako's Killer Life (2025), Yakuza boss

=== Video games ===
- Yakuza (2005), Hiroshi Hayashi
- Yakuza 2 (2006), Hiroshi Hayashi
- Yakuza: Dead Souls (2011), Hiroshi Hayashi
- Ryū ga Gotoku Ishin! (2014), Takeda Kanryūsai
- Yakuza Kiwami (2016), Hiroshi Hayashi
- Yakuza Kiwami 2 (2017), Hiroshi Hayashi
- Ryū ga Gotoku Online (2018), Hiroshi Hayashi

=== Dubbing ===
- The Fast and the Furious (2005 TV Asahi edition) (Dominic Toretto (Vin Diesel))
