= Lily Amir-Arjomand =

Iranian-American librarian (born 1938)

Leili Amir Arjmand, pre-1979.

Lily Amir-Arjomand (born Lily Jahan-Ara in 1938) is a former leader of the Iranian Institute for Intellectual Development of Children and Young Adults and the founder of the children's public library system in Iran. During her tenure, the institute developed hundreds of libraries and cultural centers throughout Iran.

== Early life and education ==
Amir-Arjomand was born in 1938. She studied at Razi High School in Tehran, where she attended classes with Farah Diba, who later became queen of Iran. She completed a bachelor's degree in French at University of Tehran. She completed her MLIS degree at Rutgers University, under the instruction of Mary Virginia Gaver. She then returned to Iran and married Hossein Ali Amir-Arjomand.

== Career ==
Amir-Arjomand initially proposed the development of a children's library to Queen Farah, who provided the land for its construction. By the late 1960s, Amir-Arjomand became the leader of what was then called the Organization for the Intellectual Development of Children and Young Adults. Under her leadership, the library initiative built and maintained about 300 libraries and cultural centers in Iran, created mobile units to distribute books, and established a publishing house to create and translate children's books into Persian.

Amir-Arjomand supported publishing Behrangi's The Little Black Fish.

After the 1979 Iranian Revolution, she moved to the United States and became an American. She began working at Saks Fifth Avenue in 1989. She moved to Dubai in 2004 and became the general merchandise manager for Style Avenue Middle East, the official licensee of Saks Fifth Avenue.

== Awards and recognition ==
Amir-Arjomand received the 2023 Farhang Heritage Award.

The international film magazine Sight and Sound named her as one of the 100 Hidden Heroes of Cinema, namely for being one of the key architects of the New Iranian cinema.
