= Madjid Niroumand =

Iranian child actor

Madjid Niroumand (Persian: مجید نیرومند) is an Iranian educational administrator, and former child actor. He is best known for playing the lead role of Amiro in Amir Naderi's The Runner (1984), which is regarded as one of the seminal films in modern Iranian cinema. The director discovered him after a six-month search for a suitable lead, having spotted Niroumand in a newspaper photograph of four youngsters who won a race.

He also appeared in Naderi's follow-up movie Water, Wind, Dust (1989). In the 1990s, Niroumand moved to Norway and afterwards made his way to the United States, eventually settling in California. He studied at Cal State Long Beach and Cal State Dominguez Hills before completing his PhD from Argosy University. He works as an educational administrator in California.

Niroumand's life was portrayed in the 2016 documentary A Boy's Own Story.
