= City of Hormuz Ardeshir =

Ancient city active during the Sassanid Empire

Hormuz Ardeshir
- Location: Ahvaz, Khuzestan province, Iran

History
- Built: 226 AD
- Built by: Ardashir I

Iran National Heritage List
- Official name: Hormuz Ardeshir
- Type: Ruins
- Designated: 1931
- Reference no.: 43
- Conservation organization: Cultural Heritage, Handicrafts and Tourism Organization of Iran

The City of Hormizd-Ardashir, known as Hormuz-Ardeshir (Persian: شهرستان هرمزد اردشیر), is an archaeological area from the Persian Sassanid time.

It's located in the Khuzestan Province and the current Ahvaz in South-Western Persia (current Iran).

Ezzatollah Negahban first referred to Ahvaz as the location as the city of Hormuz Ardashir. He had uncovered many Sassanid pottery artifacts in the region. The actual site is probably under the modern city, and has yet to be identified.

Hormuz Ardashir is believed to have been originally built by Ardashir I, the founder of the Sassanid dynasty (224-651 CE), upon the ruins of the Achaemenid city of Tareiana.

In 2007, construction in Ahvaz was halted due to concerns by local heritage activists that the tunneling would destroy the ancient Sassanid city of Hormuz Ardeshir.

== See also ==
- Ardeshir I
- Persian Empire
- Sasanian Dynasty
