= Alavi School =

Islamic high school in Tehran, Iran

Coordinates: 35°41′48″N 51°26′15″E

Location
- Tehran; Iran

Alavi Institute (Persian: موسسه فرهنگی علوی) is an Islamic high school in Tehran, Iran.

== History ==
In 1955, against the backdrop of despair and pessimism of the Great Depression in Iran, Ali Asghar Karbaschian who known as Allameh founded the Alavi Institute as an Islamic high school in Tehran, the capital of Iran. In 1957 new students entered classes on an old house which was bought for about $15000 and remodeled. The school was accredited by the Ministry of Education, and beside academic subjects, taught Islamic matters.

Allameh was a scholar in the city of Qom. He left preaching activities and came to Tehran and established the institute in the name of Imam Ali, the first Imam of the Shi'as.

== Admissions ==
Alavi High school is difficult to gain admission to. About 70-80% of the 9th grade class are students that completed education in Alavi's primary and middle schools. The school's admissions process includes an examination and then an interview.

70-80 students are selected for the 9th grade to form that year's class; these students are then grouped into three classes. The 9th grade class continues to 12th grade and the students are mixed and re-grouped every year.

== Reputation ==
Several students from Alavi high school have been awarded medals at international math and science olympiads.

== Education ==
Alavi High School teaches its students three majors which are Math and Physics, Natural Sciences, and Humanities.

== Alumni ==
- Mohammad Javad Zarif
- Mohammad Nahavandian
- Abdol Karim Soroush

== Staff ==
Hossein Karbaschin, son of Allameh, is the principal of the school as of 2007.

== See also ==
- Firouz Bahram High School
- Alborz High School
- Razi High School
