= Water, Wind, Dust =

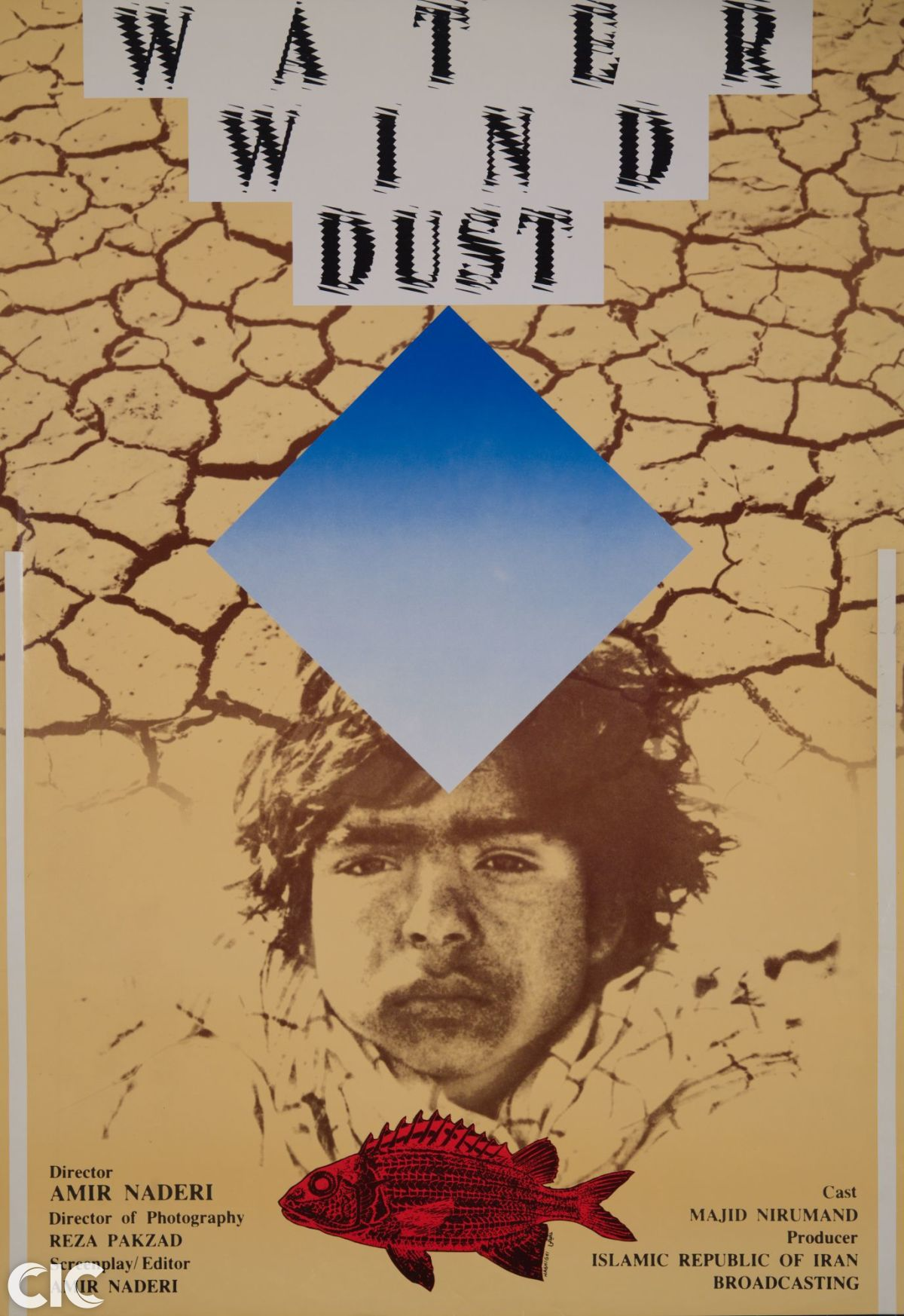
Water, Wind, Soil movie poster

Water, Wind, Dust is a 1989 film by the Iranian director Amir Naderi. It is often seen as a companion piece to the director's earlier film The Runner, and stars the same lead actor Madjid Niroumand. Both films also won the Montgolfière d'Or prize at the Three Continents Festival.

Water, Wind, Dust is regarded as one of Naderi's finest films. The filmmaker Sean Baker described it (and The Runner) as having a major influence on his 2017 feature The Florida Project.
