= Arabik Baghdasarian =

Iranian cartoonist, graphic designer, translator

Arapik Baghdasarian
- آراپیک باغداساریان
- Born: August 25, 1939; Sari, Iran
- Died: January 29, 1986 (aged 46)
- Education: University of Tehran
- Occupations: cartoonist, director and translator
- Known for: painting, drawing, director, cartoons

Arapik Baghdasarian (Armenian: Arapik Baghdasarian; August 25, 1939 – January 29, 1986) was an Iranian-Armenian cartoonist, graphic designer and translator.

== Biography ==
Baghdasarian was born in Sari in 1939. He finished his studies in the Faculty of Fine Arts of Tehran University in the field of painting and spent about a year studying graphics in France. He worked in the fields of caricature, graphics and book illustration and then succeeded in directing short films, fiction and animation.

Baghdasarian died on November 9, 1364, at the age of 46.

== Career ==
Baghdasarian's caricatures were featured in one or two prestigious magazines of the time, including Negin magazine, where he used the pseudonym Petros Karamian, remaining incognito for many years. Iranian art historian Ruyin Pakbaz describes Baghdasarian as a knowledgeable, sharp, and masterful artist, noting that he "was not recognized as he should have been in his time." Baghdasarian worked in various fields such as illustration and book design, animation, poster, and advertising art, but his main interest was in humor and caricature. He found black humor to be an effective medium for expressing his philanthropy and social sensitivities, experimenting with the techniques of both old and new satirical masters in this context.

Baghdasarian worked in graphics and book illustration department at the Institute for Intellectual Development of Children and Young Adults (IIDCYA) and later at the Franklin Book Program. Alongside Noureddin Zarrinkelk and Ebrahim Haghighi, he played an active role in promoting the graphic designs of the Grapharm workshop between 1985 and 1989. During this period, the primary activities of the Grapharm workshop involved the design of generic drug packaging, with pharmaceutical factories and the Association of Pharmacists of the Medical System leading these efforts.

Before the 1979 revolution, Baghdasarian was also involved in creating revolutionary posters as part of the Fine Arts students group. Additionally, he directed numerous movies.

== Filmography ==
- The field of protection [حوزهٔ استحفاظی] (1971)
- Weightlifter [وزنه‌بردار] (1970)
- Caught [گرفتار] (1969)
- Caught [گرفتار] (1971)
