= Negahban =

Negahban is an Iranian surname. Notable people with the name include:

- Ezzat Negahban (1926–2009), Iranian archaeologist
- Navid Negahban (born 1968), Iranian American actor
