= Razi High School =

School in Tehran, Iran

Coordinates: 35°45′58″N 51°24′35″E

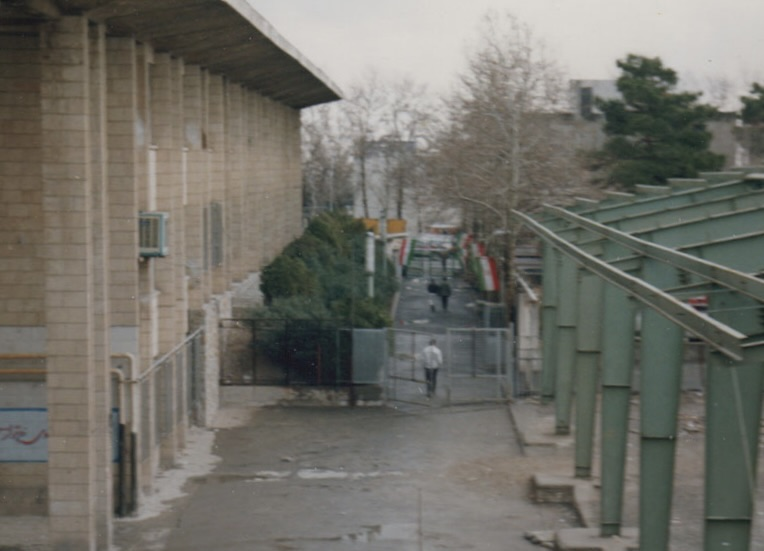
- Tehran; Tehran, Tehran; Iran

Information
- Type: Private - Created from an agreement between the Mission Laique Francaise and the Iranian Government before the 1979 revolution
- Established: 1950
- Faculty: 90
- Grades: Preschool, Elementary, and High school
- Enrollment: 3000
- Campus: Urban
- Mascot: Lions of Razi
- Website: Unofficial razihighschool.com

Le Lycée Razi (Persian: دبیرستان رازی), translated in English as Razi High School, was a French-language co-ed school located on Pahlavi Street (renamed Valiasr Street after the 1979 revolution) in Tehran, Iran. The school is named after Razi, a Persian physician, philosopher, and scholar. The first Razi school was built during the 1950s in a different area of Tehran, and at the beginning of the 60s a new campus was built north of Vanak Square in Tehran.

Prior to the 1979 Iranian Revolution, the school was one of two French-language schools in Tehran along with Lycée Jeanne d'Arc. In contrast to the more rigiorous and religious association at Jeanne d'Arc, Razi was associated with upper-middle class families in Tehran due to the fact that members of the Pahlavi dynasty attended the school.

== Notable alumni ==
- Lily Amir-Arjomand, former leader of the Institute for Intellectual Development of Children and Young Adults and founder of the children's public library system in Iran
- Fereydoun Farrokhzad, singer and show anchor
- Arash Hejazi, Iranian British author and the witness in the death of Neda Agha Soltan
- Media Kashigar, writer, translator, and poet.
- Ali Reza Pahlavi II, 1976 - younger son of Mohammad Reza Pahlavi, the last Shah of Iran, and his wife Farah.
- Farah Pahlavi, the last empress of Iran.
- Marjane Satrapi, Iranian and French graphic novelist, film director

== See also ==
- Alavi Institute
- Firouz Bahram High School
- Alborz High School
