= Sound barrier (disambiguation) =

Sound barrier may refer to:

- Sound barrier, the transition at transonic speeds from subsonic to supersonic travel, usually referring to flight
- The Sound , a British 1952 film directed by David Lean
- Sound Barrier, a heavy metal band from Los Angeles
- Sound Barrier (film), a 2005 Iranian film
- Noise barrier, an exterior structure designed to protect sensitive land uses from noise pollution
