= Imamieh =

Coordinates: 38°02′57″N 46°16′58″E

Imamieh is a suburb of Tabriz, Iran found in the southern part of the city. It is famous for its Imamieh cemetery (or Emamiyyeh cemetery; Farsi:قبرستان امامیه) where author Samad Behrangi has been buried.

== See also ==
- Samad Behrangi
