= Cut (2011 film) =

- Directed by: Amir Naderi
- Written by: Amir Naderi; Abou Farman; Shinji Aoyama; Yuichi Tazawa
- Produced by: Eric Nyari; Engin Yenidunya; Regis Arnaud
- Starring: Hidetoshi Nishijima; Takako Tokiwa
- Cinematography: Keiji Hashimoto
- Edited by: Amir Naderi
- Production company: Tokyo Story
- Distributed by: Bitters End
- Release dates: 1 September 2011 (68th Venice International Film Festival); 17 December 2011 (Japan)
- Running time: 133 minutes
- Country: Japan
- Language: Japanese

Cut is a 2011 Japanese drama film directed by Amir Naderi, starring Hidetoshi Nishijima and Takako Tokiwa.

== Cast ==
- Hidetoshi Nishijima as Shuji
- Takako Tokiwa as Yoko
- Takashi Sasano as Hiroshi
- Shun Sugata as Masaki
- Denden as Takagaki
- Takuji Suzuki as Nakamichi

== Production ==
Cut was initially inspired by the director Amir Naderi's relationship with the late John Cassavetes. After he met the actor Hidetoshi Nishijima at the Tokyo Filmex festival in 2002, he decided to adapt the story to Japan.

== Reception ==
Neil Young of The Hollywood Reporter described Cut as "Amir Naderi's violent homage to Japanese cinema". Dan Fainaru of Screen International felt that the film is "certainly one of the most significant to come out this year in Venice, both in shape and content." Chris Cabin of Slant Magazine gave the film 2 out of 4 stars. He commented that Shuji might be "the most convincingly pretentious and frustrated cinephile to ever be portrayed on film" and Hidetoshi Nishijima is "admirable in conveying Shuji's caustic misanthropy without making him entirely unlikable." Meanwhile, Ben Umstead of Twitch Film criticized the film, noting that the film's climax is "so cinema-indulgent that it may perhaps only be tolerated by a cinephile that can knowingly take it in with a sense of humor and a great sense of empathy... and a lot in between."

Mark Shilling of The Japan Times gave the film 3.5 out of 5 stars. He said: "As stills from some of Naderi's 100 favorites flash on the screen amid the blows and blood, Cut becomes not only a paean to beloved films, but also a rallying cry against the forces of greed and cynicism. The ultra violence, however, threatens to drown out the message. [...] Despite the many shout-outs to Japanese directors in Cut, from Akira Kurosawa to Takeshi Kitano, Naderi is not simply the latest foreigner trying to make a fake 'Japanese movie.' Instead he has made a Naderi movie, using Japanese cinema as an inspiration, while referencing the local culture's traditional love of the self-sacrificial hero."
