= Esfandiar Ahmadieh =

Esfandiar Ahmadieh (Persian: اسفندیار احمدیه; 1929–2012) was an Iranian animation film director. He is regarded as the "father of the Iranian animation". His most significant works include the films Molla Nasreddin, Satellite, Jealous Duck, Wheat Crop, and Where Are You Going Kite? He drew many of his animations with pencil.

His 90-minute film Rostam and Esfandiar (no relation to filmmaker) tells the story of the legendary hero Esfandiar, originally told if Ferdowsi's epic Shahnameh.
