= Vegas: Based on a True Story =

- Directed by: Amir Naderi
- Written by: Susan Brennan; Bliss Esposito; Charlie Lake Keaton; Amir Naderi
- Cinematography: Chris Edwards
- Edited by: Amir Naderi
- Release date: 2008
- Language: English

Vegas: Based on a True Story is a 2008 American indie drama film co-written and directed by Amir Naderi. It entered the main competition at the 65th edition of the Venice Film Festival.

== Cast ==
- Mark Greenfield as Eddie
- Nancy La Scala as Tracy
- Zach Thomas as Mitch
- Walt Turner as Brian
- Alexis Hart as Stephanie
- Benjamin Weil as Detective Quinn
