= National Garden of Nishapur =

Historic garden in Nishapur, Iran

Baghmeli of Nishapur
- باغ ملی نیشابور
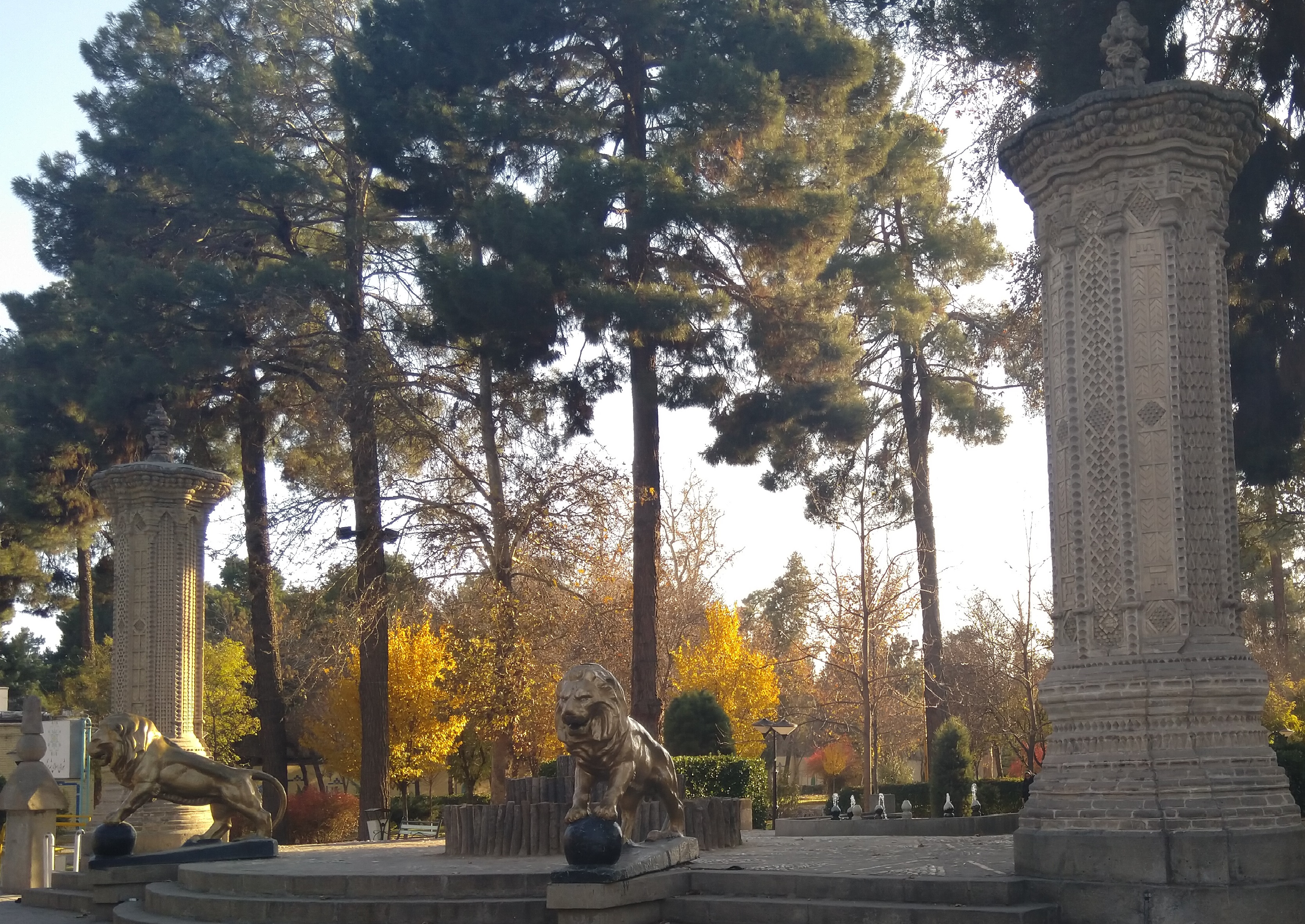
- The northern entrance of Baghmeli of Nishapur in November 2021
- Interactive map of the Baghmeli of Nishapur area

General information
- Status: Open to the public
- Type: Garden and urban park
- Architectural style: Iranian architecture
- Location: Nishapur, Razavi Khorasan province, Iran
- Coordinates: 36.208°N 58.790°E

The National Garden of Nishapur (or also: Baghmeli of Nishapur, also Romanized as Bagh-e Meli of Nishapur; Persian:باغ ملی نیشابور lit. 'The national garden of Nishapur') is a historic and touristic Persian style garden and urban park close to the downtown of Nishapur. This garden is home to the city council of the city and the Nishapur branch of the CIDCA. This garden and the brick made monuments built in its northern entrance are part of the national heritage list of Iran with the registration number of 13364.

The history of this garden probably dates back to the Pahlavi era. The brick made monuments were made by Mohammad Hossein Akhavian, a Persian artisan specialised in brickwork who died on 11 January 2020.
