= Monte (film) =

- Directed by: Amir Naderi
- Written by: Amir Naderi; Donatello Fumarola
- Starring: Andrea Sartoretti; Claudia Potenza
- Cinematography: Roberto Cimatti
- Release date: 2016
- Countries: Italy; United States; France
- Language: English

Monte is a 2016 Italian-American-French drama film co-written and directed by Amir Naderi. It premiered out of competition at the 73rd edition of the Venice Film Festival.

== Plot ==
In a remote past, identifiable with the period of the Middle Ages, in a semi-abandoned village at the foot of a mountain lives Agostino with his wife Nina and son Giovanni and with a little girl whose funeral is celebrated right at the opening of the film. The mountain overlooks the village and rises like a wall against the sun's rays that never reach their land, reduced to stones and scrub. People die of hunger and emigrate but the protagonist Augustine, despite all the suggestion to leave, does not want to submit to poverty and decides that the fate of his family is there, among the peaks.

== Cast ==
- Andrea Sartoretti as Agostino
- Claudia Potenza as Nina
- Zac Zanghellini as Giovanni
- Anna Bonaiuto
- Marco Boriero as Capofamiglia
