= Ashkbous =

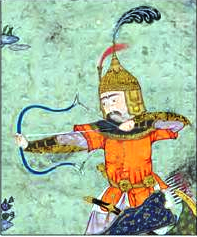
Ashkbous in the Shahnameh of Shah Tahmasp

Ashkbous (Persian: اشکبوس) is a Keshanian hero in Shahnameh who fights with Iranians in the Battle of Kamous-e Kashani. In Bondari's translation of Shahnameh into Arabic, his name is given as Askbos. In the story of Kamous, Ashkbous first fights with Rohham and defeats him, but he himself was defeated and killed by Rostam who was fighting on foot without Rakhsh. The battle of Rostam and Ashkbous was a popular choice in Persian miniature. It has been suggested that Kashanians or Koshanians are related to Kushan Empire.
