= Samad Behrangi =

Iranian writer and social critic (1939–1968)

- صمد بهرنگی
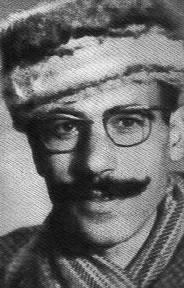
- Behrangi in the 1960s
- Born: 24 June 1939; Tabriz, Iran
- Died: 31 August 1968 (aged 29); Aras River, Iran
- Cause of death: Drowning
- Education: Tabriz University
- Occupations: Short story writer; teacher; social critic; social activist; poet; translator
- Years active: 1957–1968
- Criminal charges: Political criticism

Samad Behrangi (Persian: صمد بهرنگی; 24 June 1939 – 31 August 1968) was an Iranian teacher, social activist and critic, folklorist, translator, and short story writer of Iranian Azerbaijani descent. He is famous for his children's books, particularly The Little Black Fish. Influenced by predominantly leftist and communist ideologies that were common among the intelligentsia of his era‌, which made him popular among the Organization of Iranian People's Fedai Guerrillas (an Iranian communist organization), his books typically portrayed the lives of the children of the urban poor and encouraged the individual to change their circumstances by their own initiatives.

== Early life ==
He was born on 24 June 1939, in the neighborhood of Charandab in Tabriz, Imperial State of Iran. He was from a working-class family, his parents were Sara and Ezzat, and he had two brothers and three sisters. His father was a seasonal worker and his income was never sufficient. His father, like millions of other workers on the move for better life conditions, eventually left Iran for the Caucasus and never returned.

He finished elementary school and three years of secondary school in Tabriz, before enrolling in a rural teacher training school. He spent two years at the Daneshsara-ye Keshavarzi and finished the program in 1957; thus, only receiving few years of education. At the age of 18, he became a teacher, and continued to be so for the rest of his life, in the East Azerbaijan province of Iran.

== Career ==
In the next eleven years, while teaching Persian in rural schools of Iranian Azerbaijan, he attained a B.A. degree in English from the University of Tabriz. He started publishing stories in 1960, his first being Adat (English: Habit). He carried on writing stories, along with translating from English and Azerbaijani to Persian, and vice versa. Later, he was dismissed from his high school teaching position, due to a claim that he was impolite, and assigned to an elementary school. Then, as his cultural works increased, he was accused and persecuted, and suspended from teaching. After a while his sentence was called off and he returned to schools. Later, he attended student protests.

== Publications ==
Apart from children's stories, he wrote many pedagogical essays and collected and published several samples of oral Azerbaijani literature. His folklore studies have usually been done with the help of his colleague Behrooz Dehghani, who helped publish some of Behrangi's works after his early death. Behrangi also has a few Azerbaijani language translations of Persian poems by Ahmad Shamlou, Forugh Farrokhzad, and Mehdi Akhavan-Sales.

=== List of publications ===
- Behrangi, Samad (1969). کندوکاو در مسائل تربیتی ایران [Investigations into the Educational Problems of Iran] (in Persian).
- Behrangi, Samad (August 1968). ماهی سیاه کوچولو [The Little Black Fish] (in Persian). Farshid Mesghali (illustrations). Nashr-i Nakhustīn. ISBN 9648037396.
- Behrangi, Samad (1968). اولدوز و کلاغ‌ها [Olduz and the Crows] (in Persian).
- Behrangi, Samad (1967). اولدوز و عروسک سخنگو [Olduz and the Talking Doll] (in Persian). جامه‌دران،. ISBN 9645858720.
- Behrangi, Samad (1969). One Peach Thousand Peaches.
- Behrangi, Samad (April 1, 2014). تلخون: مجموعه قصه [Talkhoon: A collection of stories] (in Persian). (Amirkabir Publications)انتشارات امیرکبیر.
- The Complete Stories of Behrang, publishers, Persian Culture & Art Institute, Vancouver and Zagros Publications, Montreal, Canada

== Death ==
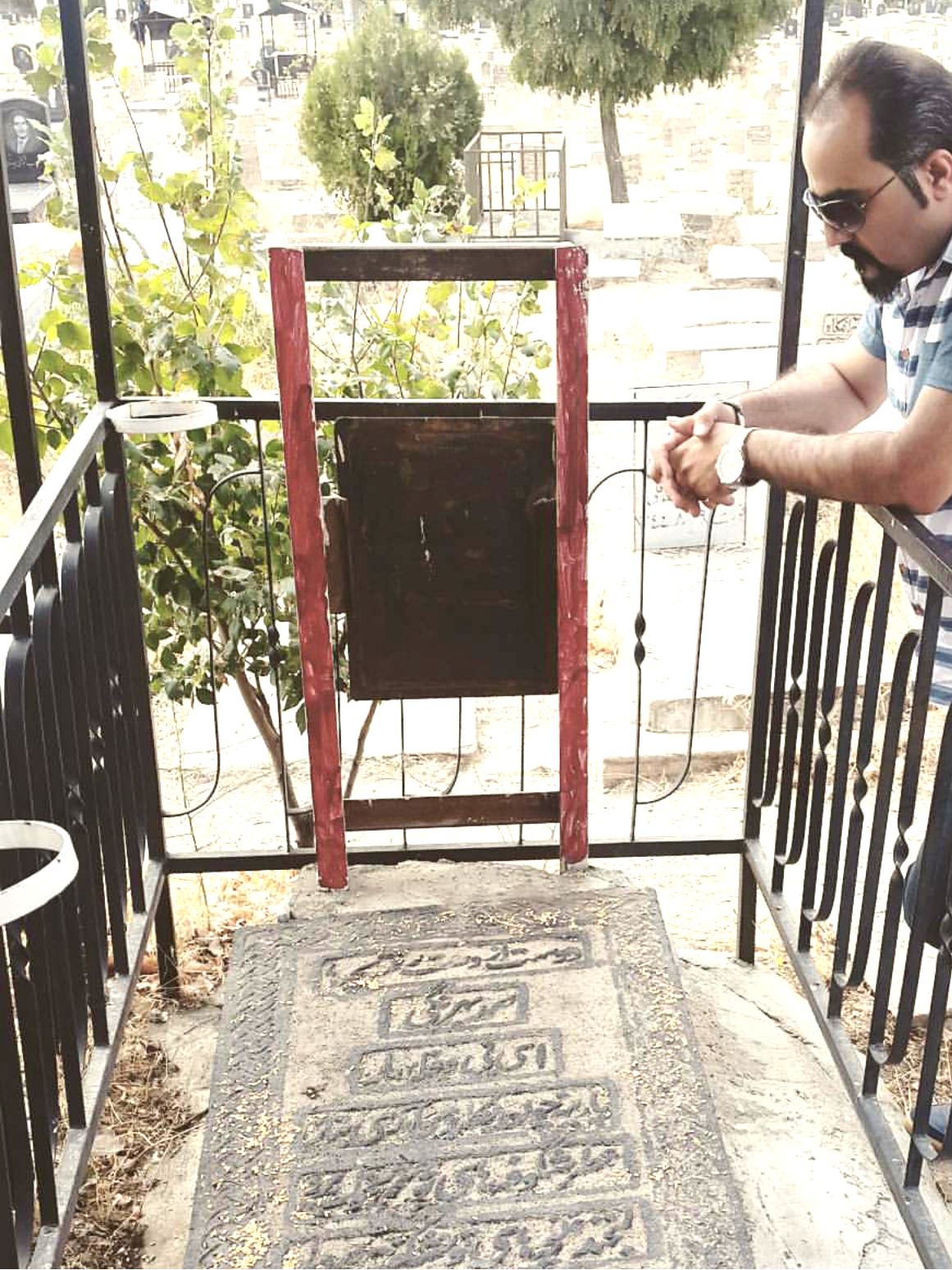
Behrangi's tomb

Behrangi drowned in the Aras river on 31 August 1968. His death was blamed on the Pahlavi government. It is believed that an army officer, Hamzeh Farahati, was seen with him when he drowned. Farahati in his book and in an interview with Voice of America has unequivocally denied the claims he and SAVAK murdered him.

He is buried in the Imamieh cemetery in the Imamieh neighborhood of Tabriz.

== See also ==
- Imamieh
- Tabriz
