= Ali Akbar Sadeghi =

Iranian painter and artist (b. 1937)

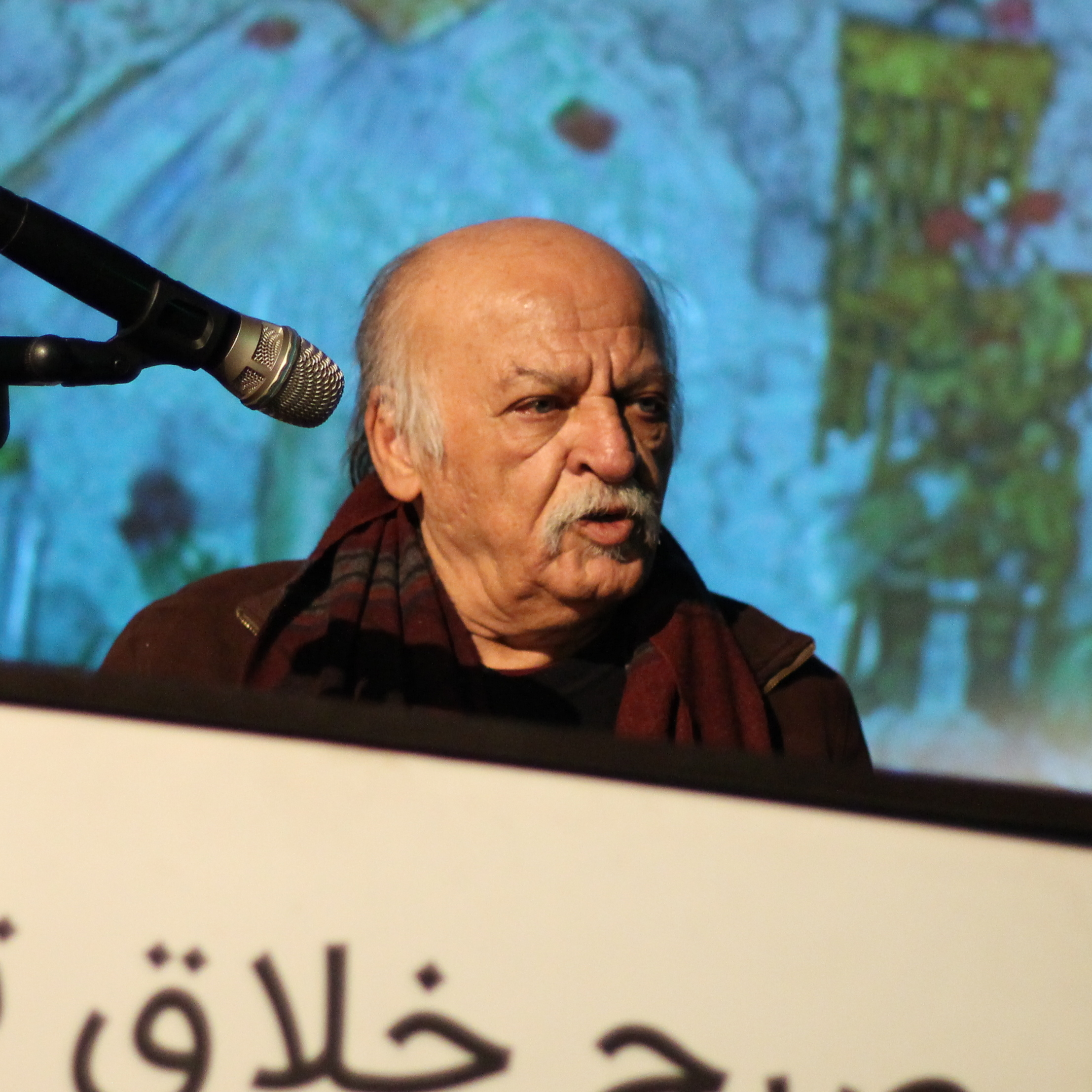
- Ali Akbar Sadeghi In CreativeMornings/Tehran, Fab 2019
- Born: 22 November 1937 (age 88); Tehran, Imperial State of Iran
- Occupations: Painter, animator, film director, and illustrator
- Known for: Iranian Surrealist
- Spouse: Ashraf Banihashemi
- Awards: Iranian Science and Culture Hall of Fame
- Website: aliakbarsadeghi.com

Ali Akbar Sadeghi, also Ali-Akbar Sādeqi (Persian: علی‌اکبر صادقی; born 22 November 1937;), a graduate of the College of Art, University of Tehran, is an Iranian painter and artist.

As a child, Ali Akbar Sadeghi reminisces that he would be lost in the chants of narrators that gave account of Shahnameh stories; accounts of Siavash riding on horseback, still-armored Bijan, Rostam’s arrow hitting Ashkbous in the heart, Faramarz, elephant rider, and bravery of other heroes whose names remain in Persian literature and Iranian folklore forever. In general, the lyrical, heroic world of legends is an indispensable part of Ali Akbar Sadeghi's worldview, a world whose figurative representations sometimes appear in old miniature paintings or more popular forms of art, including coffeehouse painting, reverse painting on glass, imprints on wood and paper, and stunning images in lithographed books.

He began to teach painting in high school in the 1950s before entering university in 1958. His early works were with watercolor, but as of 1959, he began oil painting and drawing soon after entering college. He initiated a particular style in Persian painting, influenced by Coffee House painting, iconography, and traditional Iranian portrait painting, following the Qajar tradition — a mixture of surrealism influenced by stained glass art. He did his early works in graphics and illustration.

After the 1979 Iranian Revolution, Sadeghi seriously pursued painting. In 1989, he founded Sabz Gallery, which actively and continuously exhibited the works of Iranian painters until 2003.

Sadeghi has been artistically active for the past 60 years.

== Work ==
In his paintings, Ali Akbar Sadeghi draws on Persian art traditions but adds a surreal edge to them.

== Style ==
His style is a kind of Iranian surrealism, based on Iranian forms and compositions of traditional paintings, the use of Iranian iconography, and the use of Persian cultural motifs, signs and myths, full of movement and action, in prominent and genuine oil colors, in large frames, very personal, reminiscent of epic traditional Persian paintings and illustrations, with a conspicuous mythical style. He initiated a special style in Persian painting, influenced by Coffee House painting, iconography, and traditional Iranian portrait painting, following the Qajar tradition – a mixture of surrealism influenced by the art of stained glass.

The style and striking use of color in paintings and sculptures of Ali Akbar Sadeghi behold the richness of iconography in Qajar era paintings, particularly a school of painting that has become known as the Qahveh Khaneh (Coffee house paintings). The meticulous detailing, intricate scenes and the subject matter, often heroes in full armor, follow the traditions of Miniature painting. At close inspection, many artists’ works are, in one way or another, self-portraits. The storyteller, the sleepwalker, seems unable to invent without identifying with the characters of his imagination. Here is a world where the heroes of artists do not appear to be fighting the world's evils; they are either frozen in time or seem to be engaged in their internal conflict. From the “Hanged Coat” to the depiction of the old hero with an aid band on his face to the “Torture Armchair”, there is a strong sense of defeat but evil doesn't seem to have prevailed. The artist appears content with the wisdom that age and years of turmoil have brought him. These self-portraits and their poetic reality can evoke feelings of empathy from the viewer and reflect internal conflict. The surreal world of Ali Akbar Sadeghi is governed by the strength of dreams and is a world of his own making. He expresses his emotional turmoil within scenes and objects which are complete and precise. And when he is not busy pushing nails into his heroes' faces, he is ready to play chess. The game of nobility commands tact, maturity, and dignity.

== Filmography ==
- Seven Cities (1971)
- Flowers Storm (1972)
- Boasting (1973)
- The Rook (1974)
- Malek Khorshid (1975)
- Zaal and Simorgh (1977)
- Coalition (2005)

== See also ==
- History of animation
  - History of Iranian animation
- Iranian art
- Islamic art
- Islamic calligraphy
- List of Iranian artists
