= The Little Black Fish =

Children's book by Samad Behrangi

The original book cover published in 1967. The illustrations by Farshid Mesghali won several awards including the Hans Christian Andersen Award in 1974.

The Little Black Fish (Persian: ماهی سیاه کوچولو, Mâhī-ye Sīyāh-e Kūchūlū) is a well known Persian language children's book written by Samad Behrangi. The book was widely considered to be a political allegory, and was banned in pre-revolutionary Iran (prior to the 1979 revolution). Other than its notable story, the original illustrations of the book by Farshid Mesghali received the Hans Christian Andersen Award in 1974 for his "lasting contributions" as a children's illustrator. Various translations of the book have been published in multiple countries.

== Plot ==
The story is told through the voice of an old fish speaking to her 12,000 children and grandchildren. She describes the journey of a small black fish who leaves the safety of the local stream to venture into the world.

The path of the little fish leads down a waterfall and along the length of the river to the sea. Along the way, the fish meets several interesting characters, including a helpful lizard and the dreaded pelican.

With both wisdom and courage, the fish travels far and the tale eventually ends with the Little Black Fish setting a lasting example for others.

== Translations ==
- The Little Black Fish. Classics of Persian Literature. Vol. 2. Translated by Amuzegar, Hooshang. Illustrated by Allison Remick. Ibex Publishers. 1997. ISBN 9780936347783. OCLC 35808282.
- The Little Black Fish. Art and design by Bizhan Khodabandeh. 2011. ISBN 9780615666075. OCLC 855482613.
- The Little Black Fish. Translated by Rassi, Azita. Illustrated by Farshid Mesghali. Tiny Owl Publishing. 2015. ISBN 9781910328002. OCLC 902745489.

== Reviews ==
- In April 2015, the new translation of The Little Black Fish by Tiny Owl with its award-winning original illustrations got first in David Cadji Newby's top 10 children's books list for The Guardian.

== Awards ==
- Hans Christian Andersen award for illustrations by Farshid Mesghali (1974)
- First Graphic Prize, Sixth International Children Books’ Fair in Bologna for illustrations by Farshid Mesghali (1969)
- Honorary Diploma, Bratislava Biannual, Czechoslovakia, for illustrations by Farshid Mesghali (1968)
