= Sound Barrier (film) =

2005 film by Amir Naderi

- Directed by: Amir Naderi
- Screenplay by: Amir Naderi; Abou Farman; Heather Murphy
- Produced by: Amir Naderi
- Starring: Charlie Wilson; Louise Flory; Jeremy X Halpern; Frank Glacken; Zach Cregger
- Cinematography: Michael Simmonds
- Edited by: Amir Naderi
- Music by: Adonis Tsilimparis
- Production company: Alphaville Films
- Release date: April 22, 2005 (Tribeca)
- Running time: 116 minutes
- Country: United States
- Language: English

Sound Barrier is a 2005 American drama film directed by Iranian filmmaker Amir Naderi from a screenplay he co-wrote with Abou Farman and Heather Murphy, starring Charlie Wilson, Louise Flory, Frank Glacken, Jeremy X Halpern, Frank Glacken and Zach Cregger. It follows a deaf-mute 11-year-old boy searching for a tape of his mother's voice. This the last film of Naderi's New York period. It won prizes at the Rome Film Festival and at the Torino Film Festival.

== Cast ==
- Charlie Wilson as Jesse
- Louise Flory as Julie (voice)
- Jeremy X Halpern as voice on the tape
- Zach Cregger as man on a bike
- Frank Glacken

== Production ==
Sound Barrier is the final film of director Amir Naderi's New York period. The screenplay was written by Naderi, Abou Farman, and Heather Murphy. Naderi also edited and produced the film with the company Alphaville Films, with Rosalie Arkell as executive producer. Michael Simmonds served as cinematographer.

Naderi said about Sound Barrier:

All of my experience over the years in making films came together in this film[…]. In making Sound Barrier I discovered how much I could push beyond my limits, and in so doing, learned many things about myself and my work[...]. It was one of the reasons I left my country. A film about the moon. I have always had a dream of being on the moon; it is exactly where I want to be. This is the beginning of a new path for me.

== Release ==
The film premiered at the 2005 Tribeca Film Festival on April 22, 2005. The version that premiered at Tribeca had 116 minutes. The version that screened at the 2006 Busan International Film Festival had 86 minutes. Another version screened at the MoMA in 2018 with 95 minutes.

== Reception ==
=== Critical response ===
Ronnie Scheib of Variety wrote: "Amir Naderi's latest black-and-white excursion into obsession may be the most extended mise en scene [sic] of pure frustration in cinema history".

=== Accolades ===
Year	Award / Festival	Category	Recipient(s)	Result	Ref.
2005	Rome Film Festival	Roberto Rossellini Critics' Prize	Amir Naderi	Won	
2005	Rome Film Festival	Best Actor	Charlie Wilson	Won	
2005	Torino Film Festival	Filmcritica Award	Amir Naderi	Won	
