= Firooz Bahram High School =

High school in Tehran, Iran

- دبیرستان فیروز بهرام
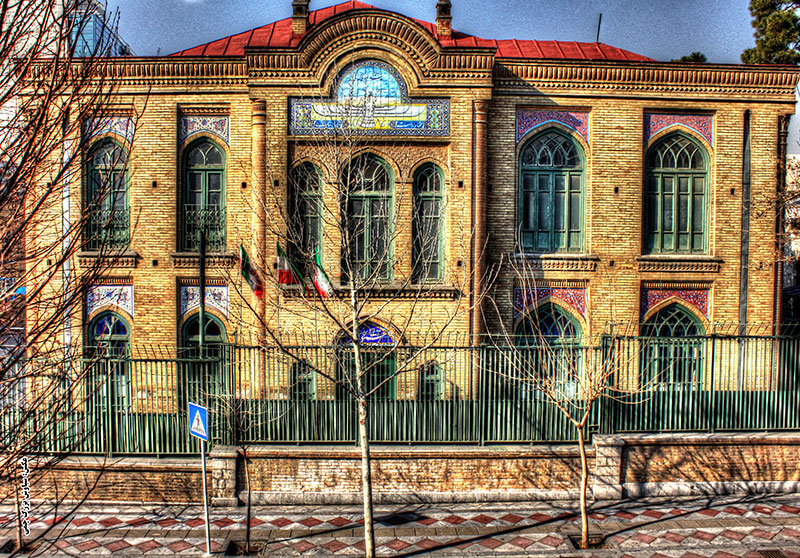

Location
- ST Mirza Kuckkhan, Tehran, Iran
- 35°41′43″N 51°24′50″E

Information
- Founded: 1932
- Founder: Bhramjy Bikajy

Firooz Bahram High School (Persian: دبیرستان فیروز بهرام) is one of Tehran's oldest high schools still in operation.

== History ==
Built in 1932, it was constructed on the property of Zoroastrians such as Ardeshir Kiamanesh. The school was named after an Iranian Zoroastrian that died in the Mediterranean in World War I. The school's establishment was supported by the then Zoroastrian representative in the Majles, Keikhosrow Shahrokh.

== Notables ==
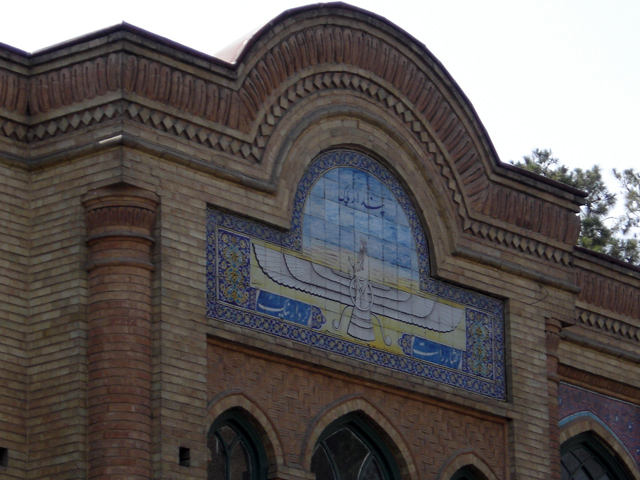
The Zoroastrian symbol Farvahar on the main facade of the building.

Seyyed Hossein Nasr (President of Sharif University) went to Firooz Bahram High School before leaving for the United States. A Prime Minister of Iran, Chancellor of Tehran University, and Ezzat Negahban (Iran's father of Archeology) are among the alumni of this school. The school was not the first Zoroastrian high school in Tehran however. That credit is given to Jamshid Jam (جمشيد جم) High School built in 1906.

Kamaloddin Jenab, one of Iran's pioneers of nuclear physics was director of the school for a while.

== Architecture ==
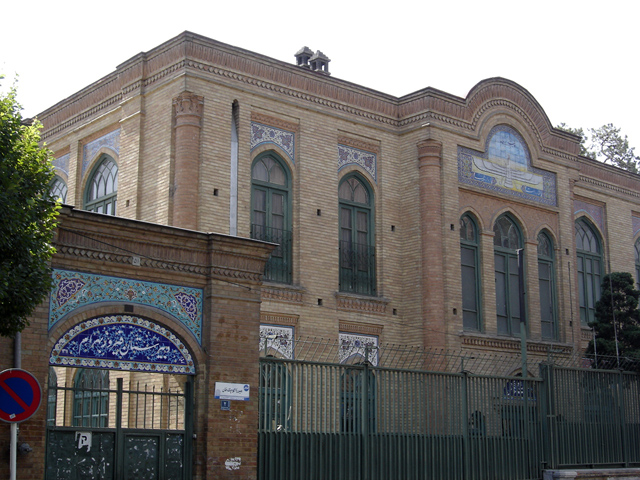

The architecture of the building is that of the Qajar era.

== See also ==
- Iranian Architecture
- Nikan High School
- Razi High School
- Alborz High School
- Zoroastrians in Iran
