= Institute for the Intellectual Development of Children and Young Adults =

Iranian film production company

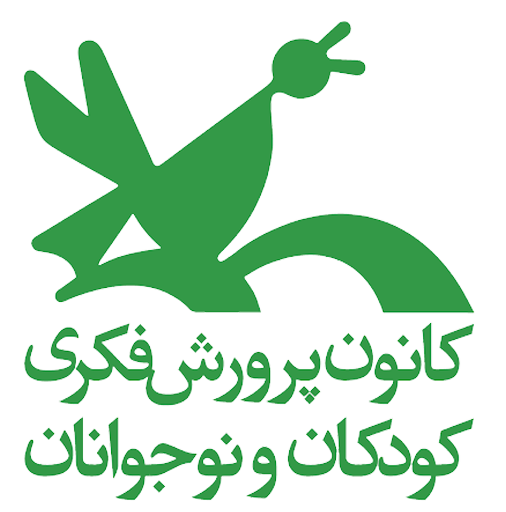
- Established: 8 January 1965
- Founder: Farah Pahlavi; Lily Amir-Arjomand
- Type: Cultural
- Location: Tehran, Iran
- Products: Book, short film, documentary, music, animation, puppet show, toy, computer training (software)
- President/chairman: Mehdi Ali Akbarzadeh
- Website: kpf.ir
- Formerly called: Center for the Intellectual Development of Child and Adolescent

Center for the Intellectual Development of Child and Adolescent (CIDCA, Persian: کانون پرورش فکری کودک و نوجوان, Kānoon-e Parvaresh-e Fekri-e Koodakān va Nojavānān, better known as Kanoon or Kānoon) is an Iranian institution with a wide range of cultural and artistic activities in the field of mental and cultural development for children and young adults. The organization was at the centre of the vanguard of cultural production in the late 60s and early 1970s and is the platform through which many of Iran's most regarded artists and filmmakers launched their careers.

== History ==
=== Early years ===
Founded in 1965, Kanoon was originally one of the many cultural initiatives that fell under the broad purview of Farah Pahlavi. Its initial ambitions were educational and social in nature; the program, led by one of Farah's close friends Lili Amir-Arjomand, involved building a network of both permanent and traveling libraries across the country in order to promote culture and literacy. During this period, Kanoon's publishing consisted only of translating and importing western classics such as Hans Christian Andersen. Eventually, Kanoon began producing and publishing its own books and soon after grew to be not just a social organization, but also a prolific producer of many kinds of materials for children.

At the center of this leg of the initiative was Firooz Shirvanloo, who acted as both co-director and as an informal Art Director for the organization. Through Shirvanloo, Kanoon attracted many of the famous names that are associated with the project today: Abbas Kiarostami, Farshid Mesghali, Noureddin Zarrinkelk, Amir Naderi, Morteza Momayez, Ali Akbar Sadeghi, Parviz Kalantari, Ardavan Mofid, Hengameh Mofid, Kambiz Samimi Mofakham and more. Shirvanloo's strong political leanings also attracted an equally significant group of left-wing writers and researchers. (He was fired in 1972 for this very reason.)

Established as a pioneering institution, the Institute for the Intellectual Development of Children and Young Adults, commonly known as Kanoon, provided an environment of significant creative freedom and institutional support for artists. During this era, Kanoon functioned as a collaborative incubator that enabled prominent multidisciplinary creators to work across various media, including illustration, graphic design, animation, and filmmaking. Kanoon's productions helped shape the cultural landscape for a generation of Iranian youth through widely circulated literature and media, establishing an enduring legacy that continues to influence contemporary Iranian culture.

=== Theatre Centre ===
The Theatre Centre of Kanoon, established in 1971 by Don (Roger) Laffoon, quickly became a prominent force in Iranian children's theatre, significantly impacting both cultural promotion and artistic education. Laffoon directed the Centre until 1976, assisted by Ardavan Mofid, who subsequently took over leadership after completing his Master's in theatre at Florida State University.

Under Laffoon's innovative direction, the Theatre Centre created four pivotal programs: a professional acting company touring throughout Iran and internationally to countries like Australia, Germany, and Wales; a puppet theatre program developed by Kambiz Samimi Mofakham and Ardeshir Keshavarzi; a nationwide team of trained educators promoting creative dramatics; and a company of adolescent actors emerging directly from Kanoon’s library and cultural theatre classes, under Mofid’s leadership.

Committed to accessibility, Laffoon introduced the world's first mobile theatre, built in Hamburg, equipped with its own power generator. This innovation allowed the Centre to deliver performances to even the smallest and most remote communities across Iran.

Numerous popular plays marked the Theatre Centre’s successful repertoire, including "Miss Butterfly" (Šāhparak ḵānum) and "The Turnip" (Torob) written by Bijan Mofid, "Rise and Shine Miss Sun" (Ḵoršid ḵānom āftāb kon), "The Cloak of a Thousand Tales" (Šenel-e hezār qeṣṣeh), and "Rostam o Sohrab" written by Gholamhossein Mofid. International acclaim followed, with performances at festivals and extensive tours across Germany, Wales, and major Australian cities like Sydney, Melbourne, Adelaide, and Perth.

The Theatre Centre of Kanoon served as a foundational training ground, nurturing future notable artists, including Marzieh Boroumand, Bahram Shahmohammadloo, Reza Babak, and Hengameh Mofid. Additionally, acclaimed playwright Bijan Mofid contributed significantly as a writer, enriching Kanoon’s theatrical offerings. Through these dedicated efforts, Kanoon’s Theatre Centre became an influential pillar in Iran’s cultural and artistic landscape, leaving an enduring legacy in children's theatre.

=== Post-Revolution ===
Although no longer at the center of an artistic vanguard, Kanoon continues to operate as an important public institution to this day; continuing with its program of libraries, publishing, animation, and most significantly, film.

In 1999, Children of Heaven was nominated for the Best Foreign Language Film of Academy Awards (Oscar) and honored in many festivals globally.

Currently, Mehdi Ali Akbarzadeh is appointed as the General Director of Institute for the Intellectual Development of Children and Young Adults by order of the Minister of Education.

== Partial filmography ==
=== Feature films ===
Year	Title	Director	Notes
1974	The Traveller	Abbas Kiarostami	
1974	Entezar (Waiting)	Amir Naderi	
1985	The Runner	Amir Naderi	
1987	Kelid (The Key)	Ebrahim Forouzesh	Written by Abbas Kiarostami
1987	Where Is the Friend's Home?	Abbas Kiarostami	
1989	Homework	Abbas Kiarostami	
1989	Bashu, the Little Stranger	Bahram Beyzai	
1992	And Life Goes On	Abbas Kiarostami	
1998	Children of Heaven	Majid Majidi	Nominated for and Academy Award for Best Foreign Language Film

=== Short films ===
Year	Title	Director	Notes
1969	Amoo Sibiloo (Uncle Moustache)	Bahram Beyzai	
1970	Safar (the Journey)	Bahram Beyzai	
1970	The Bread and Alley	Abbas Kiarostami	
1972	Black and White	Sohrab Shahid-Saless	
1972	Zang-e Tafrih	Abbas Kiarostami	
1974	Harmonica	Amir Naderi	
1974	Hassani	Shahpur Gharib	
1975	Two Solutions for One Problem	Abbas Kiarostami	
1975	So Can I	Abbas Kiarostami	
1976	Rangha	Abbas Kiarostami	

=== Animations ===
Year	Title	Director	Notes
1970	Mister Monster	Farshid Mesghali	
1970	Misunderstanding	Farshid Mesghali	
1971	The Boy, the Bird and the Musical Instrument	Farshid Mesghali	
1971	Seven Cities	Ali Akbar Sadeghi	
1972	The Grey City	Farshid Mesghali	
1972	Flower Storm	Ali Akbar Sadeghi	
1973	A Very Good Worm	Farshid Mesghali	
1973	Boasting	Ali Akbar Sadeghi	
1973	The Bird of Doom	Morteza Momayez	
1974	Look Again	Farshid Mesghali	
1974	Rook	Ali Akbar Sadeghi	
1975	The Sun King	Ali Akbar Sadeghi	
1975	Mad Mad World	Noureddin Zarrinkelk	
1977	Amir Hamza the Lover and the Dancing Zebra	Noureddin Zarrinkelk	
