= The Runner (1984 film) =

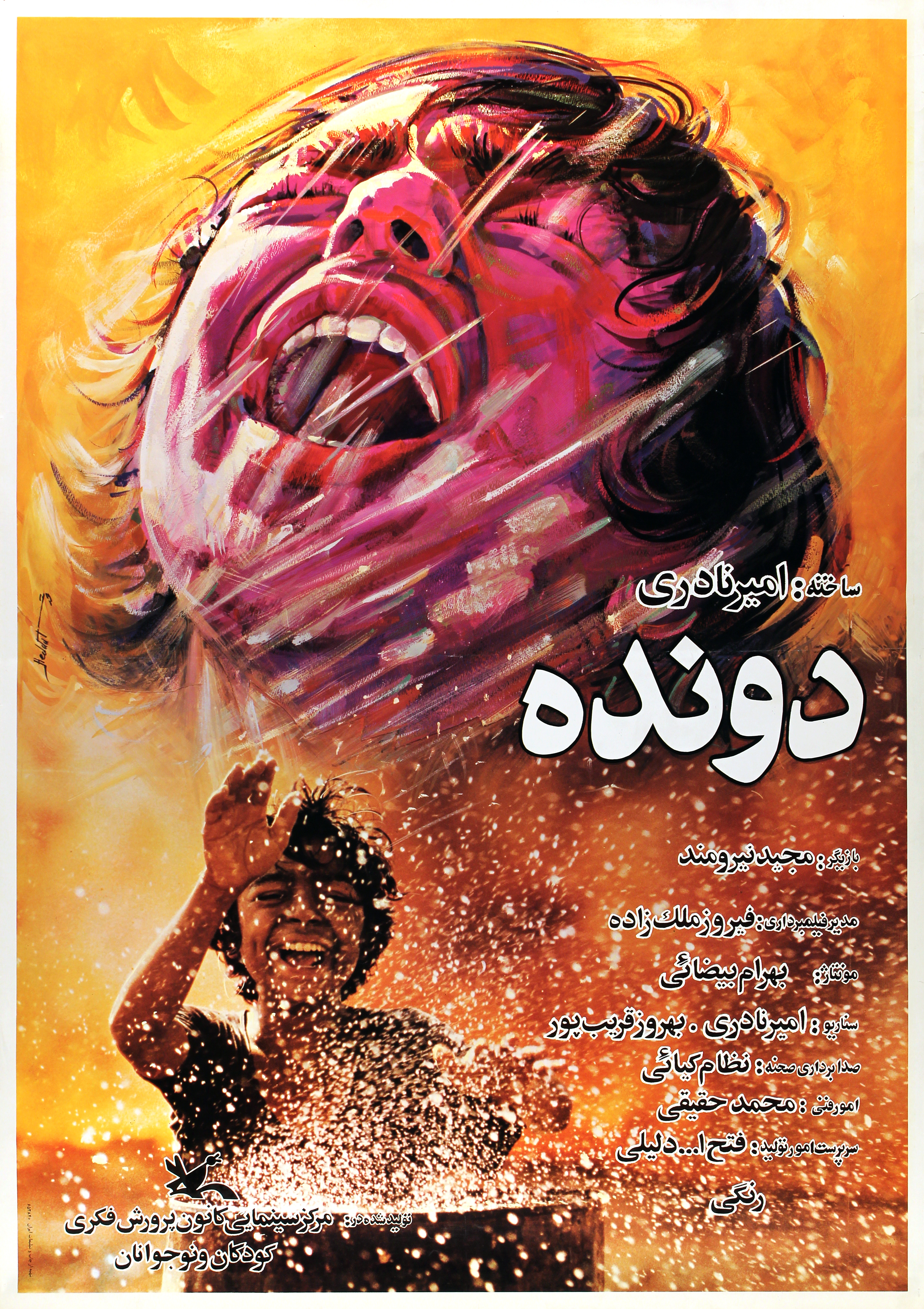
- Directed by: Amir Naderi
- Written by: Behrouz Gharibpour; Amir Naderi
- Produced by: Ali Reza Zarrin
- Starring: Abbas Nazeri; Majid Niroumand; Musa Torkizadeh
- Cinematography: Firooz Malekzadeh
- Edited by: Bahram Beizai
- Release date: 1984
- Country: Iran
- Language: Persian

The Runner (Persian: ...دونده, Davandeh...) is a 1984 Iranian film by Amir Naderi.

Full movie

The Runner was one of the first post-revolutionary Iranian films screened and celebrated internationally. Inspired by director Amir Naderi’s own boyhood, it sets the tone for many of the films that followed: realism, children's perspective of the world, innocence, gentleness, set in poor neighbourhoods, exposing great disparities in wealth, resting much of the film on the shoulders of one young actor, using children's lives as analogies for, or explicit expositions of, the problems of the adult world. The film is critically acclaimed for presenting an authentic image of the encounter with modernity in Iranian cinema.

== Plot ==
The story of the movie is based on Naderi’s own childhood experiences.

Amiro is an orphan living in the southern Iranian port city of Abadan. Picking up the bottles, he gives them to his gaffer. Moreover, his bosom friend Moussa also picks bottles for a living. As Amiro eats on the seabank with Moussa, they both want to sail the ship into the sea. In his heart, Amiro wants to flee by ship or plane.

He joins a group of boys to pick up floating bottles. They all gather and count bottles. Afterwards, another boy comes up to Amiro and pushes him hard while claiming that he stole his bottles. They fight, and the boy claims ownership of two bottles. Amiro is startled and leaves with thoughts of his miserable fortune. He gives Gaffer his entire collection, and due to his small collection of bottles, Gaffer only gives him a small payment. Amiro continues to his home, an abandoned ship by the water.

His coworker friends all show up to take him bike riding, and they compete against one another. They have fun while drinking Coke, singing and beating a tin on the moving train. When they enter the water to retrieve bottles, a shark appears. Everyone hastily departs for the beach. Following this, Amiro quits that job out of fear and begins selling ice water for 1 rial. A man riding a bicycle enters, asks for a glass of ice water from Amiro, takes it and then pedals away without paying. Amiro pursues him long enough to obtain his single rial.

He frequently yells at the ships as they sail away to take him with it. He realises that one day he might be able to sail on the horizon. He moves towards the runner, where an aeroplane is lying. With joy, he fiddles with it. Later on, he joins his friends in a race behind the train, but after the race, Amiro keeps running to see how far he can get away. He purchases a large ice chunk, and two men arrive to steal it, but it falls off and breaks in half. Both men take those and run away. Amiro follows one, grabs the ice chunk, and runs away with it. Despite the difficulty of carrying the large ice chunks in his hand, he arrives at the runway, where an aeroplane takes off. Sweating Amir hurls melting ice chunks at the plane in a show of honour.

Amiro switches jobs as a cobbler. He shines and repairs the shoes of the sophisticated men who visit the seaport. Moussa, his bosom friend, arrives and takes him for the last time before he departs with his brother for the sea. Moussa puts him on his bicycle and rides him to the foreign colony. They come to a halt in front of the house and enter the porch to enjoy the swing chair. They eat the food together, and Moussa acts like Charlie Chaplin to amuse Amiro. After spending the day together, his mate gives him a shirt and bids him farewell. A tear falls from Amiro's left cheek, illuminating it. He howls again at the ship and the plane, asking when he will be free of this affliction.

He goes out again to buy magazines with aeroplane pictures on the covers. As the shopkeeper watches him buy an English magazine, he offers him some Persian-language magazines to read. When he tells him he is illiterate, the shopkeeper tells him that most children his age can read and write. Following that, he enrols in a nearby school and diligently learns the Persian alphabet. Later, a local man who works at the seaport accuses Amiro of stealing a cigarette lighter from a foreigner. He becomes enraged and fights with the foreigner, saying that he has never stolen anything in his short, hard-earned life.

Amiro gathers his pals on the rail track, where they inform him that they are organising a race competition. Amiro works hard to prepare for the competition, and at the race, they all run against one other, desperate to win. They push and pull one other as they race to get to the melting ice first. Amiro is the first to reach for the melting ice, rubbing his burned face with delight. He then shares the melting ice with his friends, who also require the ice to soothe their inner fire. The film concludes with the victory of the young boy Amiro, framed by a jumbojet taking off.

== Cast ==
- Madjid Niroumand as Amiro
- Moussa Torkizadeh
- Abbas Nazeri

== Reception ==
On the review aggregator website Rotten Tomatoes, 100% of 20 critics' reviews are positive.

== Home media ==
The film was released by the Criterion Collection in March 2024 in Blu-Ray and DVD.
