= Ezzat Negahban =

Iranian archaeologist (1926–2009)

Ezatollah Negahban (Persian: عزت‌الله نگهبان; 1 March 1926 – 2 February 2009) was an Iranian archaeologist known as the father of modern Iranian archaeology.

== Biography ==
Prof. Ezat O. Negahban was born in Ahvaz, Iran. After graduating from Firooz Bahram High School, In 1949 he finished his BA in archaeology at the University of Tehran and in 1954 he received his MA in archaeology from the University of Chicago, after completing his thesis under Donald McCown. He was appointed associate professor in the Department of Archaeology, University of Tehran, in 1955, and was made a full Professor in 1962. He served as chairman of the department from 1967 to 1978, and as Dean of the Faculty of Letters and Humanities from 1975 to 1979. He was Technical Director of the Iranian Archaeological Service from 1960 to 1965, and served as Technical Advisor of the Iranian Ministry of Culture from 1965 to 1979. He served as a Visiting Curator at the University Museum of the University of Pennsylvania from 1980 until 2000.

He was chief scientist in many excavations on Iranian ancient sites including Marlik, near Rudbar, Haft Tepe, near Susa and Ahvaz, where he founded a museum to showcase artifacts from the site, and on the plain of Hamadan province, where a training center for students was established.

Among the critical contributions of Prof. Negahban to Iranian archaeology were his reforms to the curriculum of the Department of Archaeology at the University of Tehran, and the founding of the Institute of Archaeology. While he introduced and encouraged a more scientific approach to the field from the time he was appointed to the Department of Archaeology in 1956, starting in 1967, when he became chairman of the department, he reworked the curriculum around a significant component of fieldwork, mandatory for all students starting in 1970–1971. To facilitate this he established a base-camp of the department's field school on the Qazvin Plain at the site of a restored Safavid caravanserai, and secured a long-term permit to conduct field work from the Archaeological Service of Iran. Having introduced a significant practical component to the department, he introduced a Master's program, including further fieldwork at the Haft Tepe excavation in Khuzestan province during the winter seasons. The Institute for Archeology, which he founded in 1959 and where he served as Director until 1979, played a critical role in these improvements by providing instructors and students with office space, and laboratory and library facilities to analyse the results of fieldwork and publish articles. He built on these successes by securing scholarships for the pursuit of PhDs by students abroad.

He was also a good friend of British archaeologist Sir Max Mallowan, former widower of Agatha Christie.

== Projects ==
- Principal Excavations
  - Mehranabad, 1961
  - Marlik, 1961–1962
  - Haft Tepe, 1965–1979
  - Qazvin Plain, 1970–1979
- Other Projects
  - Survey of Khorasan along Soviet border, 1965
  - Survey of Kalardasht Plain, 1975–1976

== Books ==
(In English)

- 1964, Preliminary report on Marlik excavation: Gohar Rud expedition; Rudbar. 1961-1962. Iranian Archcological Service, Tehran.
- 1977, A Guide of Haft Tepe Excavation and Museum, Ministry of Culture and Art, Tehran.
- 1983, Metal vessels from Marlik. Beck. Munich.
- 1991, Excavations at Haft Tepe, Iran. University Museum of Archaeology and Anthropology, Philadelphia. (ISBN 0-934718-89-X)
- 1995, Weapons from Marlik. Reimer. Berlin.
- 1995, Marlik : The Complete Excavation Report. (University Museum Monograph; 87), University of Pennsylvania Museum Publication. (ISBN 0-924171-32-4)

== Awards ==
- 1999 Medal for Cultural Heritage, Ministry of Culture and Islamic Guidance, Iran—For a lifetimes service in the field of Archaeology
- 1992 Award for Book of the Year, Ministry of Culture and Islamic Guidance, Iran—For the Persian edition of "Excavations at Haft Tepe, Iran"
