= Amir Naderi =

Iranian film director

Amir Naderi امیر نادری
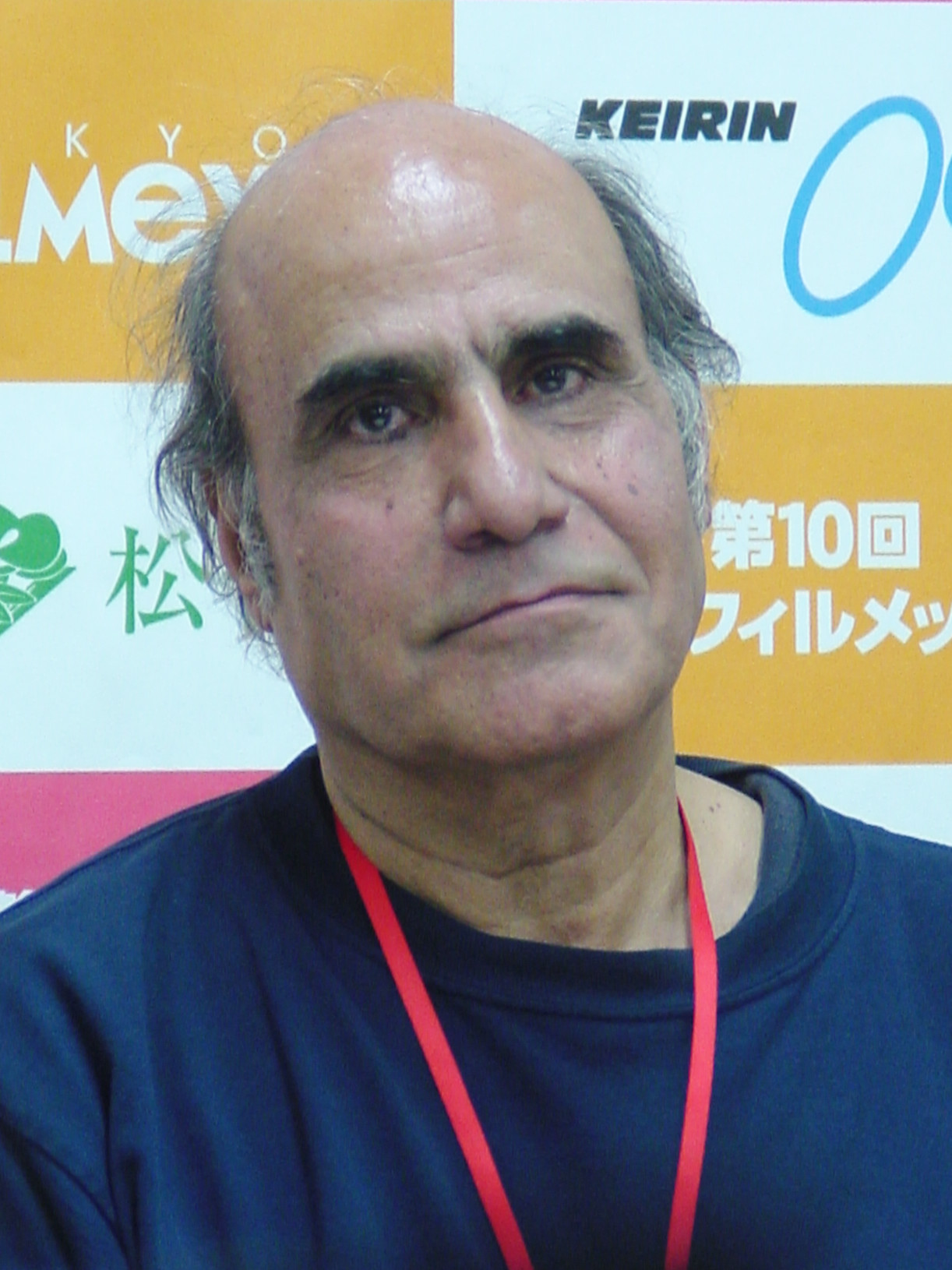
- Amir Naderi in 2009
- Born: 15 August 1946 (age 80); Abadan, Iran
- Occupations: Film director, screenwriter, photographer
- Known for: The Runner; Cut; Monte

Amir Naderi (Persian: امیر نادری, Persian pronunciation: [æˈmiːr naːdeˈriː]; born 15 August 1946, in Abadan) is an Iranian film director, screenwriter, and photographer. He is best known for The Runner and Vegas: Based on a True Story.

== Career ==
Amir Naderi grew up in Abadan, a working-class port city in southern Iran. He developed his knowledge of cinema by watching films at the theater where he worked as a boy, reading film criticism, and making relationships with leading film critics. He became interested in photography and cinema at an early age. As a filmmaker, he was inspired by Henri Cartier-Bresson's photography of urban experience and everyday life, as well as the aesthetics of Italian neorealist cinema, such as location shooting and nonprofessional actors, looser narrative structures, and a focus on the plight of poor and working-class people. Naderi's early films explored similar themes and visual strategies, but they did so within the context of Iranian life and culture. Naderi made his directorial debut with Goodbye Friend in 1971. Iranian film scholar Hamid Naficy cites Naderi's film Harmonica as an important example of how Iranian pre-revolutionary films strived to represent lower-class experiences and struggles without incurring state penalties or angering censors.

Naderi continued to make films after the Iranian revolution. His 1984 film The Runner is one of the seminal films of this period in Iranian cinema. The Runner gained wide critical recognition on the international film festival circuit and brought wider attention to what has since become the celebrated "postrevolutionary art-house" cinema in Iran. The Runner and other films Naderi made in the 1980s helped develop and promote some of the visual and narrative strategies that would also appear in the works of other Iranian art-house film directors. However, these films already hinted and anticipated the director's desire to leave Iran; Hamid Naficy called them "proto-exilic" films. By the 1990s, Naderi emigrated to the United States.

Film scholar Alla Gadassik argues that Naderi's films both before and after his move to the United States, share a preoccupation with displacement, fragmented spaces and solitude. The films also emphasize the importance of sensory experience and corporeal endurance in locating one's home in the world. In this, Naderi's work is exemplary of wider themes and motifs in Iranian diasporic cinema.

Due to smaller distribution and advertising budgets, Naderi's films are not as well known as most Hollywood films. Despite that and the lack of recognizable actors in most of his films, his work tends to find distribution (mainly in Europe and Japan), and he has earned a great deal of critical acclaim. Naderi's films and photography are also frequently the subject of retrospectives at major festivals and museums worldwide. Lincoln Center in New York, the city that has been his home for the past 20 years, offered a complete retrospective of his work in 2001, as did the International Museum of Cinema in Turin, Italy, in 2006. The most recent retrospective of his work was screened at the Busan International Film Festival, the largest in Asia.

His 2011 film Cut was shot entirely in Japanese and stars Hidetoshi Nishijima.

Amir Naderi continues to produce works of new generation of film directors such as Andrei Severny's Condition (2011), Naghmeh Shirkhan's Hamsayeh (2010) and Ry Russo-Young's Orphans (2007).

== Filmography ==
- Khodahafez Rafigh (1971) a.k.a. Goodbye Friend
- Tangna (1973) a.k.a. Impasse
- Tangsir (1973)
- Sazdahani (1974) a.k.a. Harmonica
- Entezar (1974) a.k.a. Waiting
- Marsiyeh (1978) a.k.a. Requiem
- Barandeh (1979) a.k.a. The Winner
- Josteju Yek (1980) a.k.a. Search One
- Josteju Doe (1981) a.k.a. Search Two
- The Runner (1984)
- Ab, Bad, Khak (1989) a.k.a. Water, Wind, Dust
- Manhattan by Numbers (1993)
- A, B, C... Manhattan (1997)
- Marathon (2002)
- Sound Barrier (2005)
- Vegas: Based on a True Story (2008)
- Cut (2011)
- 60 Seconds of Solitude in Year Zero (2011)
- Monte (2016)
- Magic Lantern (2018)
- Bahram Beyzaie: A Journey in Search of Identity (2021)

== Awards, honors and competition entries ==
- San Remo Film Festival – Best Film, Jury Prize, Requiem (1975)
- Virgin Islands Film Festival - Golden Plaque, Waiting (1975)
- Nantes Film Festival – Golden Montgolfiere (Grand Prix), The Runner (1985)
- Nantes Film Festival – Golden Montgolfiere (Grand Prix), Water Wind Dust (1989)
- Avignon Film Festival – Prix Tournage, A, B, C, Manhattan (1997)
- Cannes Film Festival - A, B, C, Manhattan Un certain regard (competition) (1997)
- Rome Film Festival – Roberto Rossellini Critics Prize, Sound Barrier (2005)
- Turin Film Festival – Bastone Bianco, Sound Barrier (2005)
- Venice Film Festival - Vegas: Based on a True Story, Official competition (2008)

== See also ==
- Persian cinema
- Institute for the Intellectual Development of Children and Young Adults
