= Gizella Varga Sinai =

- Born: Gizella Varga; 1944 (age 81–82); Hungary
- Education: Academy of Applied Arts, Vienna
- Known for: Painting
- Movement: Contemporary Iranian art
- Spouse: Khosrow Sinai
- Awards: Officer's Cross of the Hungarian Order of Merit (2014)

Gizella Varga Sinai (born 1944) is a Hungarian-born painter who has lived and worked in Iran since 1967. Her work draws on both Hungarian and Iranian cultural traditions and usually includes mythology, historical imagery, Persian literature and reflections on migration and cultural identity.

Varga Sinai was a co-founder, with Farah Ossouli, of the Dena Group, a collective of Iranian women artists established in Tehran in 2001. In 2014 she received the Officer's Cross of the Hungarian Order of Merit for her artistic career combining Hungarian and Eastern cultures and for her contribution to Hungarian–Iranian cultural relations.

== Early life and education ==
Varga Sinai was born in Hungary in 1944. She moved to Vienna to study art education at the Academy of Applied Arts, now the University of Applied Arts Vienna.

While in Vienna she met Iranian filmmaker Khosrow Sinai, who was studying film and music in the city. They married and moved to Iran in 1967, settling in Tehran.

Varga Sinai held her first solo exhibition at the Modern Art Gallery, ran by Jazeh Tabatabai in Tehran in 1968, a year after arriving in Iran.

== Career ==
Varga Sinai's painting developed through a number of thematic series reflecting her experience of living between Hungarian and Iranian cultures, including the series From West to East (1968–1977), Blind Dolls (1980), Echo of Silence (1986), The South and Its Masks (1999), Images and Walls, Travel Diary (Safar Nameh), and Flower Garden with Birds.

The series Blind Dolls, developed around the end of the 1970s, was based on the poetry of Omar Khayyam. Echo of Silence, first shown in 1986, was based on the reliefs of Persepolis, combining elements from ancient Iranian art in modern compositions.

Iranian history, myths and literary traditions became the main sources in her work. Varga Sinai has described her artistic practice as an attempt to connect the past with the present and to examine the continuing presence of myths and stories in contemporary life.

=== Travelogue ===
Varga Sinai began developing her Travelogue (Safar Nameh in Persian) series in the 2000s. Unlike earlier works primarily concerned with Iranian culture and history, the series became more autobiographical, narrating her migration from Eastern Europe to the Central Europe and then to Iran; and the relationship between her Hungarian background and her adopted cultural environment.

The series was exhibited during the Budapest Spring Festival in 2016. Varga Sinai described the journey from West to East as both a geographical and a spiritual one and referred to her encounter with the poetry of Hafez, Omar Khayyam and Ferdowsi as part of this experience.

Her continuing interest in Persian poetry was also reflected in a Hungarian edition of the Rubaiyat of Omar Khayyam, translated by Sándor Kocsis and illustrated by Varga Sinai.

In 2024 she exhibited a series titled Hafez Divination at Vista Gallery in Tehran.

== Dena Group ==
In 2001, Varga Sinai and Farah Ossouli founded the Dena Group in Tehran. The collective brought together twelve renowned Iranian women artists from different generations and artistic backgrounds. Rather than promoting a common style, the group sought to provide a platform through which women artists could present their individual work both in Iran and internationally. Dena organised exhibitions in Iran as well as in Europe, Asia and the Middle East.

Among the venues at which the group presented its work were the Palace of Nations, the European headquarters of the United Nations in Geneva; the European Parliament in Brussels; and the Ludwig Museum in Koblenz.

== Teaching ==
Varga Sinai taught at Moaser Studio in Tehran from 1981 to 1987 and later taught art at the German School in Tehran from 1986 to 2003. From the early 2000s onward she also organised painting and art workshops in Iran and abroad.

She became a member of the Society of Iranian Painters in 2001.

== Exhibitions ==
Varga Sinai has held solo exhibitions in Iran, Austria, Finland, Hungary and Georgia, and has participated in numerous international group exhibitions.

Selected solo exhibitions include:

- Modern Art Gallery, Tehran, 1968–1969
- Iran-America Society, Tehran, 1973
- Lautrec Gallery, Tehran, 1975
- Khaneh Aftab Gallery, Tehran, 1977
- Gallery Aai, Vienna, 1980
- Golestan Gallery, Tehran, 1989, 1992, 1994 and 1995
- Aria Gallery, Tehran, 1999
- Homa Gallery, Tehran, 2005
- Pirkanpohja Art Centre, Finland, 2007
- Galerie UngArt, Collegium Hungaricum, Vienna, 2009
- SIIN Gallery, Tehran, 2010
- Vollnhofer Art Gallery, Budapest, 2014
- National Museum, Tbilisi, 2014
- Castle Garden Bazaar, Budapest Spring Festival, 2016
- Vista Gallery, Tehran, 2024

Her work has also appeared in several editions of the Tehran Contemporary Painting Biennial and in exhibitions at the Tehran Museum of Contemporary Art, and is part of several national and international permanent collections such as the Victoria & Albert Museum Tehran Museum of Contemporary Art, and the Centre Pompidou.

== Recognition ==
In 2014, Hungarian president János Áder awarded Varga Sinai the Officer's Cross of the Hungarian Order of Merit, Civil Division. The official citation recognised her artistic oeuvre combining Hungarian and Eastern cultures, her decades of work supporting Hungarian–Iranian cultural and artistic relations, and her activities within the Hungarian community in Tehran.

== Documentary ==
Varga Sinai was the subject of the short documentary Gizella, directed by her husband Khosrow Sinai in 2000. The film narrates her life between Hungary and Iran and her career as an artist. It was screened at the cinematheque of the Tehran Museum of Contemporary Art in 2025 as part of the museum's In Women's Words programme.

== See also ==
- Farah Ossouli
- Farideh Lashai
- Khosrow Sinai
- Iranian modern and contemporary art
