= Babak Roshaninejad =

Iranian artist (born 1977)

- Born: 1977 (age 48–49); Hamadan, Iran
- Known for: Painting

Babak Roshaninejad (born 1977 in Iran) is a contemporary Iranian artist. He is known for is large scale thick oil paintings that are mainly inspired by social philosophy and the global language of the visual arts. His works were collected by the Tehran Museum of Contemporary Art.

== Career ==
Roshaninejad began his career as a self-taught painter in his early 20s. In 2008 he joined Tehran's Assar Art Gallery. Since then he has held many solo and group exhibitions in Iran and abroad and has also been part of many art fairs around the world. Roshaninejad's paintings are known for their limited colours of thick and heavy oil paint. As well as being a painter, he is the author of several books on social philosophy. Books such as 'Sleeping in Street', 'From the Unexpectedness of Culture', 'Art and Minority Discourse' and 'Art and Hidden Mechanism - Selected Essays 2001 - 2007' have all been published in Iran in the 2000s. Roshaninejad's paintings have been sold in auctions such as Christie's and the Tehran Auction.
