= Mehdi Ahmadi =

Iranian actor

- مهدی احمدی
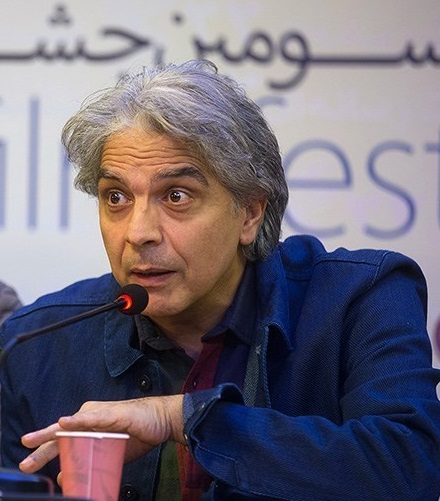
- Mehdi Ahmadi in 2015
- Born: 7 December 1966; Tehran, Iran
- Occupations: Actor; painter

Mehdi Ahmadi is an Iranian painter and film actor.

== Career ==
Mehdi Ahmadi is graphic design graduate of the University of Tehran College of Fine Arts. He started painting and his first solo exhibition was held. He participated in more than thirty painting exhibitions. He also started acting by appearing in the film In the Alleys of Love (1991) directed by Khosrow Sinaei.

== Filmography ==
- Good news to a citizen of the third millennium (2012)
- Slow in Silence (2012)
- Colorful Island (2014)
- Eyes (2014)
- Is coming in the morning (2014)
- Purple (2014)
- Berg Jan (2016)
- Forty-seven (2017)
- Maybe it was not love (2017)
