= Farideh Lashai =

Iranian painter (1944–2013)

- فریده لاشایی
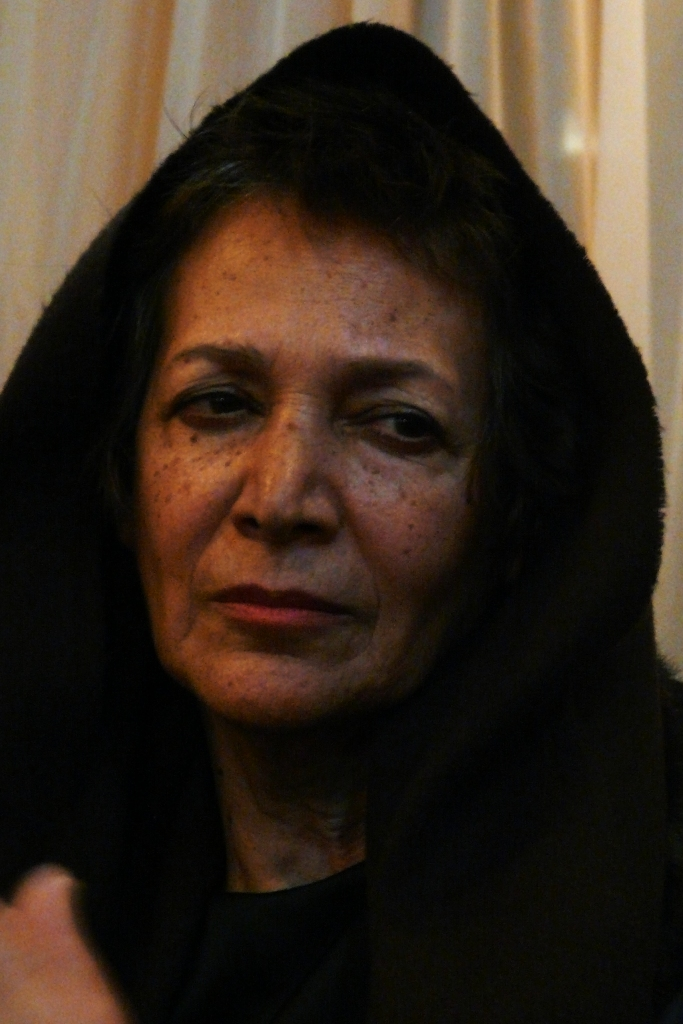
- Farideh Lashai in 2009
- Born: 1944; Rasht, Imperial State of Iran
- Died: 24 February 2013 (aged 68–69); Tehran, Iran
- Education: Academy of Fine Arts Vienna
- Occupations: Painter, printmaker, video artist, translator, writer
- Known for: Painting

Farideh Lashai (Persian: فریده لاشایی, romanized: Farideh Lāshāyī; 1944 – 24 February 2013) was an Iranian painter, printmaker, and video artist. She was also a writer and translator. Her foremost book is Shal Bamu. She is renowned for her abstract contemporary paintings, which are a combination of traditional and contemporary views of nature.

== Life ==
Farideh Lashai was born in Rasht, Iran. After finishing high school, she went to Germany. After studying in the school of translation in Munich, she studied decorative arts at the Academy of Fine Arts Vienna. She then worked for two years in Reidel glassware and crystal company.

Her paintings combined the traditional art with contemporary art, including techniques deriving from late 17th century northern Europe. The traditions of Paul Cézanne, and those of East Asia are present in her works, and yet her works are considered to have a contemporary view of nature. Her works are considered a reflection inner insight and a perception of the soul of nature. She never intended to paint the details, but instead to create a symbol and vague understanding of nature, so that they would have the feeling of nature in them.

Alongside Farah Ossouli and Gizella Varga Sinai, in the late 1990s, Lashai co-founded Dena Group, an artist collective composed of 12 Iranian female painters.

At the age of 68, after a long period of dealing with cancer, she died in Jam hospital in Tehran.

== Exhibitions ==
=== Solo exhibitions ===
- 1968, Gallerie Duomo, Milan, Italy
- 1968, Studio Rosenthal, Selb, Germany
- 1973, Seyhoon Gallery, Tehran, Iran
- 1974, Tehran Gallery, Tehran, Iran
- 1976, Tehran Gallery, Tehran, Iran
- 1977, Cultural Center of the National Iranian Oil Company, Khoozestan, Iran
- 1984, Clark Gallery, Bakersfield, California, USA,
- 1987, Gallery Demenga, Basel, Switzerland
- 1987, National Museum of Fine Arts, La Vallette, Malta
- 1987, Classic Gallery, Tehran, Iran,
- 1987, Golestan Gallery, Tehran, Iran
- 1988, Libertas Gallery, Düsseldorf, Germany
- 1988, Gallery Demenga, Basel, Switzerland,
- 1988, Mono County Arts Council Gallery at Sierra Center Mall, Mammoth Lakes, California, U.S.
- 1990, University of California, Berkeley, California, Berkeley, U.S.
- 1990, Hill Gallery, London, England,
- 1992, Golestan Gallery, Tehran, Iran,
- 1993, Gallery Aum Hufeisen, Düsseldorf, Germany
- 1994, Golestan Gallery, Tehran, Iran
- 1995, Gallery Nouste Henric, Pau, France
- 1996, Golestan Gallery, Tehran, Iran,
- 1997, Gallery Chateau Lascours, Laudun, France
- 1998, Golestan Gallery, Tehran, Iran,
- 2005, Mah Art Gallery, Tehran, Iran
- 2016, Farideh Lashai Retrospective, Sharjah Art Foundation, Bait Al Serkal, Sharjah, United Arab Emirates; curated by Sheikha Hoor Al-Qasimi
- 2017, Museo del Prado, Madrid, Spain

=== Group exhibitions ===
- 1968, International Young Artists, Ostend, Belgium
- 1971, International Exhibition of Tehran (as a member of the Austrian Pavilion), Tehran, Iran
- 1973, Iranian Women Artists International Exhibition of Tehran, Tehran, Iran
- 1975, Four Women Artists Exhibition, Iran-America Society, Tehran, Iran,
- 1978, International Exhibition, Basel, Switzerland
- 2016, Tehran Museum of Contemporary Art, Tehran, Iran

== See also ==
- List of Iranian women artists
