= Gabrielle with Open Blouse =

Painting by Pierre-Auguste Renoir

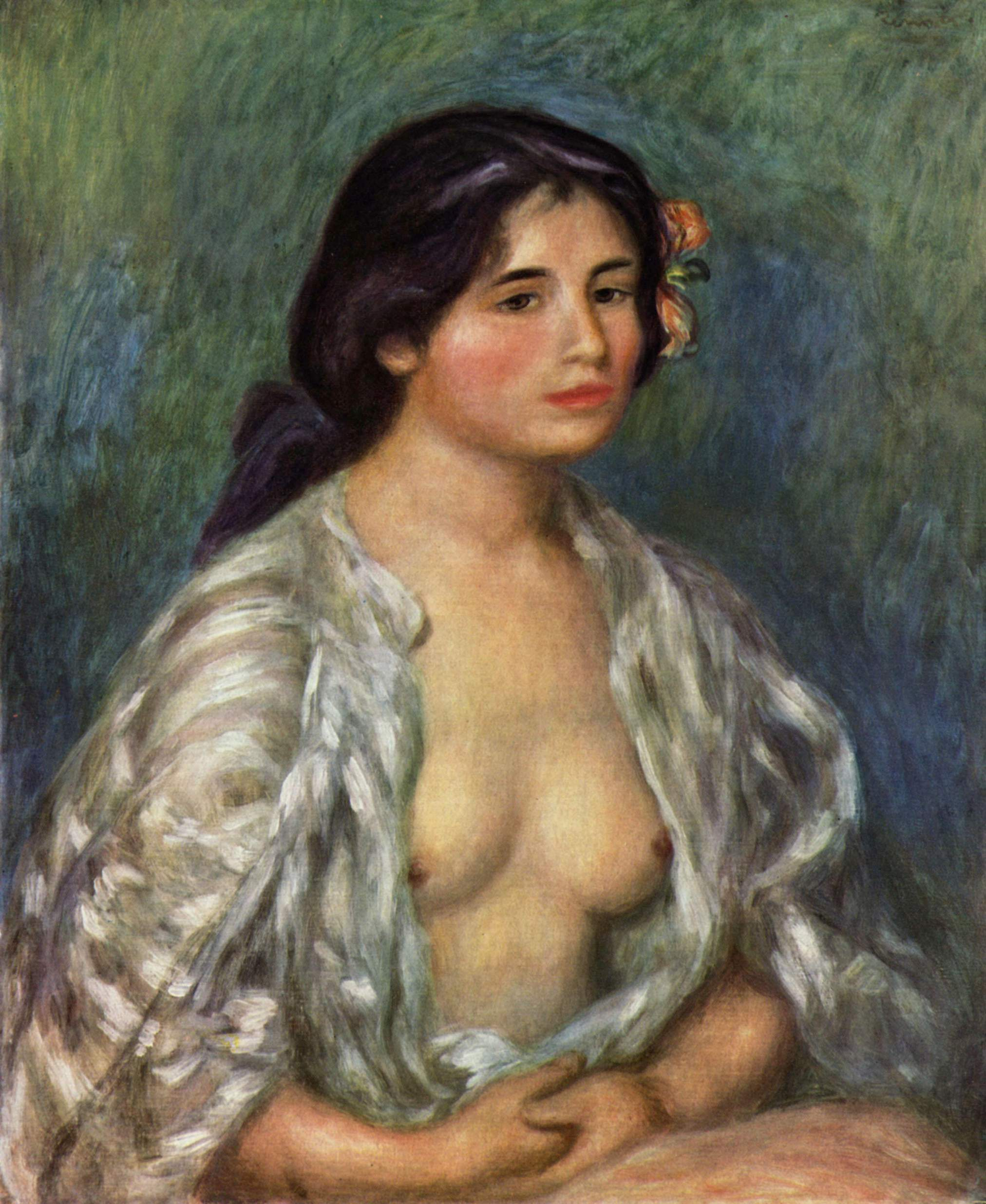
- Artist: Pierre-Auguste Renoir
- Year: c. 1907
- Medium: Oil on canvas
- Dimensions: 65 cm × 53 cm (26 in × 21 in)
- Location: Tehran Museum of Contemporary Art; Tehran

Gabrielle with Open Blouse (French: Gabrielle avec la chemise ouverte) is an oil on canvas painting by French impressionist artist Pierre-Auguste Renoir representing his late work period (1892–1919). It is in the collection of the Tehran Museum of Contemporary Art, but is not on public view because of the model's open blouse. The painting is worth an estimated US$8 million.

Gabrielle was Gabrielle Renard, a cousin of Renoir's wife Aline Charigot. She became the family's nanny in 1894 and later modelled many times for Renoir before becoming his carer. Only after his death in 1919 did she marry and move to live in America.

The artwork has been commented as illustrating the beauty of everyday moments and the human form as well as something that "can stand for everything sweet and artless in maidenhood which is not yet quite conscious of its womanliness".

== See also ==
- List of paintings by Pierre-Auguste Renoir
