= Dena Group =

- گروه دنا
- Formation: 2001
- Founder: Farah Ossouli; Gizella Varga Sinai
- Founded at: Tehran, Iran
- Type: Artist collective
- Purpose: Promotion of Iranian women artists
- Headquarters: Tehran, Iran
- Region served: Iran and internationally

The Dena Group (Persian: گروه دنا) was an Iranian women artists' collective founded in Tehran in 2001 by painters Farah Ossouli and Gizella Varga Sinai. Bringing together twelve professional women artists from three generations and differing artistic backgrounds, the group sought to promote the work of Iranian women artists in Iran and internationally while allowing its members to retain independent artistic identities and practices.

Dena was not organized around a common artistic style. Its members worked in different forms of contemporary painting, and the group's activities were primarily collaborative, cultural and social rather than based on a shared aesthetic programme. During its principal period of activity from 2001 to 2007, Dena organized or participated in more than thirty exhibitions in Iran, Europe, Asia and the Middle East, including exhibitions at the Palace of Nations in Geneva, the European Parliament in Brussels and the Ludwig Museum in Koblenz.

== History ==
The idea for Dena developed from discussions between Farah Ossouli and Gizella Varga Sinai about the professional position of women within the Iranian art world. According to a history of the group published by Shargh, they sought to create an independent platform through which established women artists could work collectively and gain greater visibility without adopting a single artistic style.

Twelve artists gathered around the project and the group began its activities in 2001. Ossouli served as the group's head or coordinator. The Ludwig Museum describes Dena as having been founded in Tehran by Ossouli and Varga Sinai with the purpose of making professional Iranian women artists better known both within Iran and abroad.

The name Dena refers to Dena, a mountain in the Zagros Mountains of Iran. An exhibition catalogue preserved by the Asia Art Archive explains that the group's choice of the name also expressed respect for nature and its creative force.

== Members ==
The original twelve members of Dena were:

- Farah Ossouli
- Gizella Varga Sinai
- Farideh Lashai
- Shahla Habibi
- Nasrin Khosravi
- Raana Farnoud
- Shahrzad Ossouli
- Aria Shokouhi Eghbal
- Mitra Kavian
- Maryam Shirinlou
- Parvaneh Zandian
- Bahar Behbahani

The artists represented three generations and had substantially different approaches to painting. Their work ranged from abstraction and landscape painting to figurative art and contemporary reinterpretations of traditional Persian visual forms.

In later years, Shahla Habibi, Bahar Behbahani, Nasrin Khosravi and Parvaneh Zandian left the group, while painter Masoumeh Mozaffari joined it.

== Aims and approach ==
Unlike artist groups formed around a common formal or stylistic programme, Dena emphasized the individual practices of its members. The Ludwig Museum described its aim as enabling Iranian women artists to speak with an independent voice while maintaining their differing personal perspectives, artistic styles and backgrounds.

The group pursued its activities on both domestic and international levels. Within Iran, it organized exhibitions outside Tehran in cities including Isfahan, Rafsanjan, Zanjan and Yazd. These activities have been interpreted as an attempt to extend opportunities for women artists beyond the cultural institutions of the capital.

Internationally, the group sought to introduce contemporary Iranian women artists to audiences who often encountered Iranian women primarily through political or stereotypical representations. Shargh has described this aspect of Dena's activity as an effort to challenge simplified perceptions of Iranian women through direct cultural exchange.

The group also developed exchanges with women artists from other countries. Its activities included inviting foreign women's art groups to Iran as well as participating in international exhibitions and workshops.

== Exhibitions ==
The first Dena exhibitions were held in Iran in 2001, including presentations at Classic Gallery in Isfahan and Kavir Gallery in Rafsanjan.

The group rapidly developed an international programme. In 2002, Dena: 12 Contemporary Iranian Women Artists was shown at venues including Fabien Fryns Fine Arts in Marbella, Spain, and the Palace of Nations in Geneva, the European headquarters of the United Nations.

In 2003 Dena exhibited at the European Parliament in Brussels and at venues in the Netherlands, Finland, France, Italy, Norway and China.

In November 2005, the Ludwig Museum in Koblenz presented the group exhibition Dena – Aktuelle Malerei aus dem Iran (Dena – Contemporary Painting from Iran). The museum emphasized the generational and stylistic diversity of the participating artists and the group's aim of increasing the visibility of professional Iranian women artists.

Further exhibitions were organized in Poland and the United Arab Emirates in 2006, and the group participated in an Iranian art festival at Al Qasba in Sharjah in 2007.
