= Still Life with Head-Shaped Vase and Japanese Woodcut =

1889 painting by Paul Gauguin

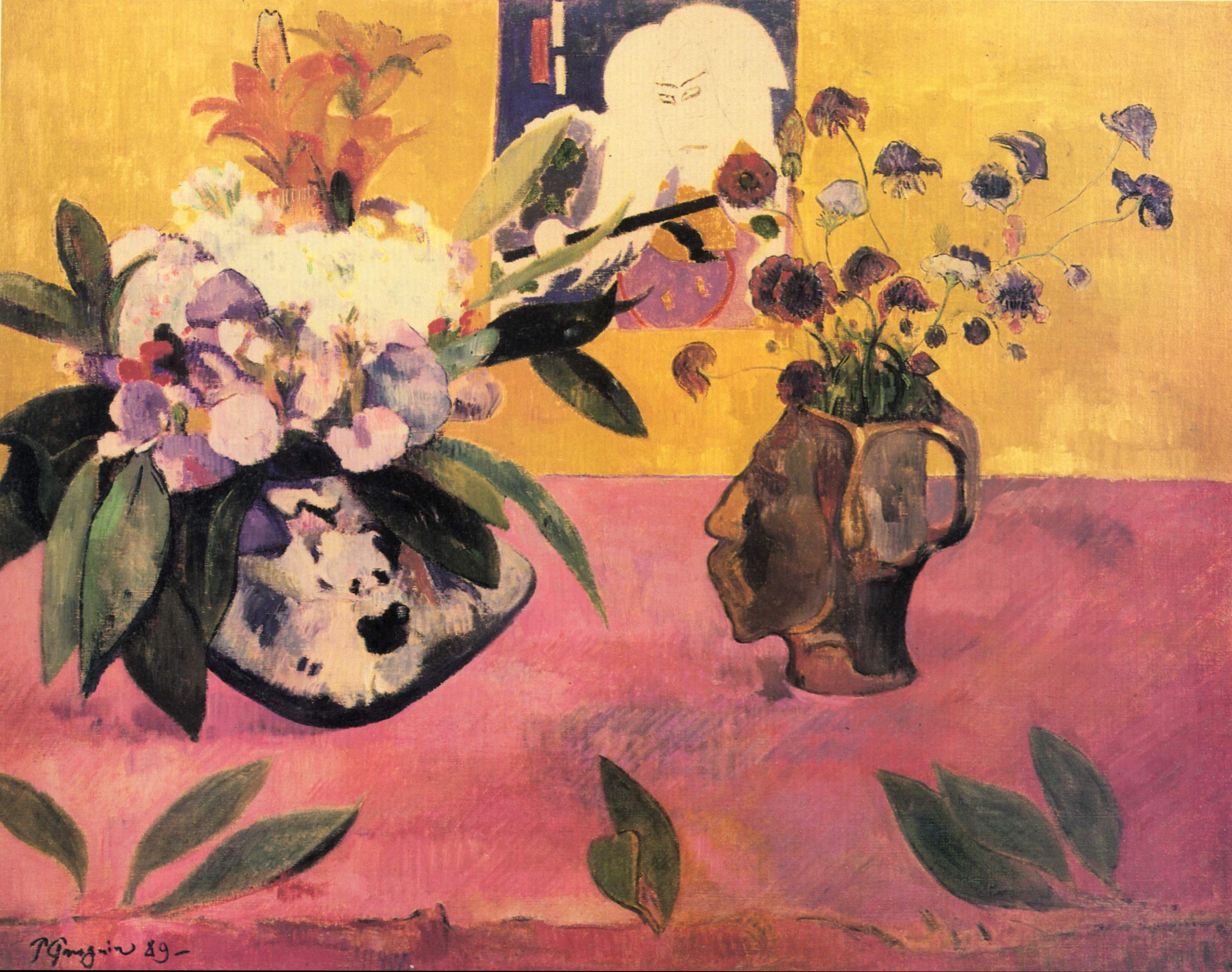
- Artist: Paul Gauguin
- Year: 1889
- Medium: Oil on canvas
- Dimensions: 72 cm × 93 cm (28.5 in × 36.5 in)
- Location: Tehran Museum of Contemporary Art; Tehran

Still Life with Head-Shaped Vase and Japanese Woodcut is an 1889 still life painting by French artist, Paul Gauguin. It is currently in the collection of the Museum of Contemporary Art in Tehran, Iran.

== History ==
In 1888 and 1889 Gauguin's enthusiasm for Japanese ukiyo-e woodcuts emerged. Japanese prints appeared in the background of his Apple and Vase painting, his portrait of The Schuffenecker Family and also Still Life with Head-Shaped Vase and Japanese Woodcut, which depicts an ukiyo-e portrait of an actor.

The painting was formerly owned by Josef Rosensaft, a Holocaust survivor who led the community of Jewish displaced persons, who died in September 1975. He left a formidable art collection that had to be sold to settle debts related to the acquisition of the art and by some accounts an extravagant lifestyle. The 1976 sale arranged by Sotheby's was bought in its entirety by the Tehran Museum of Contemporary Art, where it all remains today and is one of the oldest paintings in the museum's collection. This sale set a record for Still Life with Japanese Woodcut at $1.4 million, and the work is currently valued at $45 million.

During the direction of Mahmoud Shalouithe, the National Gallery of Art in Washington, D.C., and the Tate Modern in London tried to borrow the painting but the requests were rejected.

== See also ==
- List of paintings by Paul Gauguin
