= In the Alleys of Love =

- Directed by: Khosrow Sinai
- Written by: Khosrow Sinai
- Produced by: Khosrow Sinai
- Starring: Mehdi Ahmadi
- Cinematography: Ali Loghmani
- Edited by: Khosrow Sinai
- Release date: 1991
- Running time: 83 minutes
- Country: Iran
- Language: Persian

In the Alleys of Love (Persian: در کوچه‌های عشق, Dar Koocheha-ye Eshgh) is a 1991 Iranian war film about the city of Khorramshahr shortly after the Iran–Iraq War. The film was shot in colour on 35 mm film.

Khosrow Sinai wrote, directed, and produced the film, and composed its music.

== Film festivals ==
The film was invited to the following film festivals:

- 1991 Cannes Film Festival, (France) (Un Certain Regard)
- 9th Fajr International Film Festival (Tehran)
- Locarno International Film Festival (Switzerland 1991) (Critics Week)
- 16th International festival of festivals in Toronto (1991 Canada)
- 20th International festival of modern Cinema and Video in Montreal (1991 Canada)
- 35th International Film Festival in London (1992)
- International Film Festival of India (Bangalore 1992)
- 9th International Film Festival in Annonay (1992- France)
- 15th International Film Festival in Portland (USA - 1992)
- 16th International Film Festival in Hong Kong (1992)
- 2nd International Film Festival of “Human Rights Watch” in New York – USA – 1992
- 25th International Film Festival in Houston – USA (1992)
- 10th International Film Festival in Rivertown – USA (1992)
- 18th International Film Festival in Seattle – USA (1992)
