= Farah Ossouli =

Iranian female painter (born 1953)

- فرح اصولی
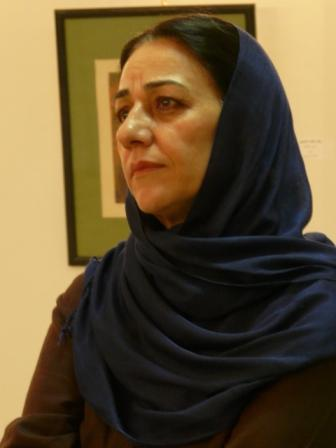
- Farah Ossouli in 2008
- Born: 10 August 1953 (age 73); Zanjan, Iran
- Other name: Farahnaz Ossouli
- Occupation: Painter
- Spouse: Khosrow Sinai (m. 1975; died 2020)
- Children: 2
- Website: Official website

Farah Ossouli (Persian: فرح اصولی, born 10 August 1953 in Zanjan, Iran) is an Iranian painter, based in Tehran. She is known for her modern interpretation of Persian miniature. Often her work draws on issues related to women's life, Persian poetry, and classical western art.

== Biography ==
Ossouli graduated in 1971 from the Girls' School of Fine Arts, Tehran. Ossouli graduated in 1977 with a B.A. degree in graphic design from University of Tehran. In 1975, Ossouli married Khosrow Sinai.

Her work is often created in gouache and watercolor and features subjects found in Persian miniature painting set in contemporary themes, subjects may include women, men, grapes, birds, flowers, grapes, among other things. Her work replaced the text often found in traditional miniature painting with blocks of color and the scale of the figures is manipulated.

She has chaired the 6th Tehran Contemporary Painting Biennial, held in 2003.

Her work has been collected in many public art collections including, the Metropolitan Museum of Art, Art Gallery of Western Australia, Tehran Museum of Contemporary Art, Los Angeles County Museum of Art, among others. She has held solo exhibitions in the United States, Europe, Iran, and participated in group exhibition in many other countries.

== Dena Group ==
In 2001, Ossouli and Gizella Varga Sinai founded the Dena Group in Tehran. The collective brought together twelve professional Iranian women artists from different generations and artistic backgrounds. Rather than promoting a common style, the group sought to provide a platform through which women artists could present their individual work both in Iran and internationally. Dena organised exhibitions in Iran as well as in Europe, Asia and the Middle East.

Among the venues at which the group presented its work were the Palace of Nations, the European headquarters of the United Nations in Geneva; the European Parliament in Brussels; and the Ludwig Museum in Koblenz.

== Bibliography ==
=== Monograph ===
- Farah Ossouli: Burning Wings; Necmi Sönmez, Sussan Babaie, 2023, Skira, ISBN 8857245578

=== Other works ===
- Rafiee, Tarlan (2018). Good morning... Good night. Cinque artiste e una curatrice, Italy, Tre Lune Edizioni, ISBN 9788889832813.
- Rafiee, Tarlan; Samimi Mofakham, Yashar; Assmann, Peter; Pereña, Helena (2020). Solace of Lovers: Trost Der Liebenden. Innsbruck, Austria: Haymon Verlag, Tiroler Landesmuseen Betriebsgesellschaft m.b.H. ISBN 978-3-7099-8119-1.
