= Suicide (Purple Jumping Man) =

1963 painting by Andy Warhol

- Artist: Andy Warhol
- Year: 1963
- Type: Silkscreen on canvas
- Dimensions: 230 cm × 202 cm (90.5 in × 79.5 in)
- Location: Tehran Museum of Contemporary Art; Tehran

Suicide (Purple Jumping Man) is a 1963 silkscreen painting by an American pop artist, Andy Warhol. It is currently in the collection of the Tehran Museum of Contemporary Art in Tehran.

== History ==
During the 1970s, Iran's oil revenue had increased, and the king and queen of Iran, Mohammad Reza Pahlavi and Farah Diba decided to establish a museum of contemporary art in order to modernize their country. Suicide (Purple Jumping Man) was among the paintings that Tony Shafrazi, the Iranian-born American art dealer, bought for the collection of this museum.

At that time, Andy Warhol was interested in the idea and painted portraits of the king and his wife.

== Style ==
Suicide (Purple Jumping Man) depicts two images in sequence, recorded by a documentary photographer, silk-screened in black ink on a purple ground.

According to Tony Shafrazi, Suicide (Purple Jumping Man) is one of the greatest works of Warhol. Shafrazi estimates the painting's value at 70 million dollars.
