= Masoumeh Mozaffari =

- معصومه مظفری
- Born: 1958 (age 67–68); Tehran, Iran
- Education: University of Tehran; Islamic Azad University
- Known for: Figurative painting, portraiture
- Movement: Contemporary Iranian art

Masoumeh Mozaffari (Persian: معصومه مظفری; born 1958) is an Iranian painter, art educator and arts administrator. She is known primarily for figurative paintings and large-scale portraits depicting ordinary people, as well as interiors in which domestic spaces and everyday objects are used to address themes of anxiety, absence, memory and the relationship between private and public life.

Mozaffari has served two periods as head of the Society of Iranian Painters and has been involved in professional organisations and juries in Iran's visual-arts sector. She was also a member of Dena, a collective established by Iranian women artists in the early 2000s.

== Early life and education ==
Mozaffari was born in Tehran in 1958. She graduated from the Tehran School of Visual Arts in 1978 and subsequently studied painting at the Faculty of Fine Arts of the University of Tehran. Her studies were interrupted by the closure of Iranian universities during the Iranian Cultural Revolution, and she completed her bachelor's degree in 1989. She received a master's degree from the Faculty of Art and Architecture of Islamic Azad University in 1997.

Her artistic education included courses and workshops with Iranian artists and art historians including Ruyin Pakbaz, Mehdi Hosseini, Yaghoob Amamehpich and Nosratollah Moslemian.

Mozaffari began teaching painting in the 1990s and taught at the faculties of art and architecture of Islamic Azad University in Tehran and Tabriz.

== Work ==
Mozaffari's early paintings from the 1980s and 1990s combined figurative imagery with fragmented, semi-abstract spaces. Art critic Ali Golestaneh has interpreted the development of her work over three decades in relation to changes in the social, economic and political conditions of Iran's urban middle class.

During the late 1990s and 2000s, domestic interiors became a recurring subject in her work. Tables, chairs, windows, doors and ordinary household objects appear within spaces that are frequently fractured through changes of viewpoint and perspective. Her paintings have been described as combining realist representation with spatial devices associated with Cubism and, in some works, conventions derived from Persian painting.

The human figure became increasingly prominent in later series. Works from Heat Stroke, Upon Their Faces, Running and In the Presence of the Others feature large portraits and figures whose restrained gestures and direct gaze create a sense of unease. Recurring details include nosebleeds, newspapers and personal objects, which Golestaneh has interpreted in relation to political and social anxiety.

Her series In the Presence of the Others was exhibited at Azad Art Gallery in Tehran in 2014. The later series Absence, produced around the period of the COVID-19 pandemic, depicts sparsely occupied domestic interiors and figures in conditions of isolation and waiting.

== Professional activities ==
Mozaffari joined the Society of Iranian Painters in the late 1990s. She served as chair of its board from 2005 to 2008 and again during the 2010s. A 2019 Art Journal publication records her second period as beginning in 2013. Contemporary Iranian press reports identified her as president of the society in 2014 and during subsequent years.

She has served on juries and selection panels for Iranian painting exhibitions, festivals and biennials.

== Dena group ==
Mozaffari was a member of Dena, an independent collective of Iranian women artists established in the early 2000s. She joined the group after its initial formation. Through Dena she participated in exhibitions in Europe and the Middle East, including projects in Poland, France and the United Arab Emirates.

== Exhibitions ==
Mozaffari has presented solo exhibitions in Tehran since the 1990s. Selected exhibitions include shows at Arya Gallery in the late 1990s, Table at Mah-e Mehr Gallery (2009), Running at Azad Art Gallery (2012), In the Presence of the Others (2014), In Some Other Place (2017), and Absence (2021).

Her work has also been included in international exhibitions such as Speaking from the Heart: The Polemic Sensibility from Iran at Framer Framed in Amsterdam in 2013 and Recalling the Future: Post-Revolutionary Iranian Art at the Brunei Gallery, SOAS University of London, in 2014.

Recalling the Future presented works by 29 Iranian artists and examined post-revolutionary Iranian art and changing constructions of Iranian cultural identity.

== Retrospective ==
In February and March 2024, the Lajevardi Foundation in Tehran presented Memories and Forgetting, a retrospective of Mozaffari's work organised in collaboration with Azad Art Gallery. The exhibition surveyed several periods of her career and coincided with the publication of a monograph on her life and work.

Golestaneh's essay on Mozaffari, originally published in the Lajevardi Foundation monograph and republished by mohit.art in 2024, traces her work across three decades and relates changes in her visual language to the political and social experience of Iran's urban middle class.

== Art market ==
Mozaffari's paintings have appeared in international auctions. An untitled oil painting dated 2011 was offered at Christie's Dubai in 2012.
