= Khosrow Sinai =

Iranian film director (1941–2020)

- خسرو سینایی
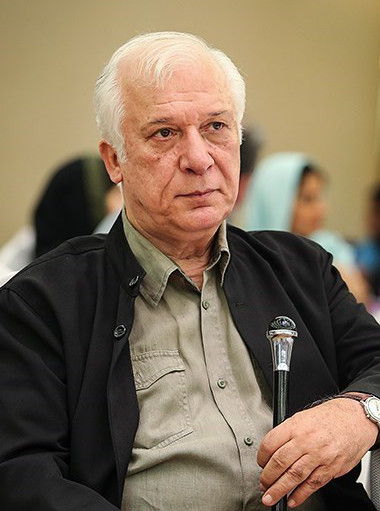
- Sinai in 2015
- Born: 19 January 1941; Sari, Mazandaran province, Imperial State of Iran
- Died: 1 August 2020 (aged 79); Tehran, Iran
- Resting place: Behesht-e Zahra Cemetery, Tehran
- Occupations: Film director, screenwriter, composer
- Years active: 1966–2020
- Notable work: Viva ...! In the Alleys of Love; The Bride of Fire
- Partner(s): Gizella Varga Sinai (1967–2020), Farah Ossouli (1975-2020)
- Children: 4
- Awards: Crystal Simorgh for Best Director (1984); Crystal Simorgh for Best Screenplay (2000); Order of Merit of the Republic of Poland (2008); Medal for Merit to Culture – Gloria Artis (2010)

Khosrow Sinai (Persian: خسرو سینایی, 19 January 1941 – 1 August 2020) was an Iranian film director, screenwriter, composer, poet and scholar.

Sinai's work was influenced by documentaries and focused on social and artistic subjects. "Bride of Fire" is among his best known movies, and has won multiple awards in both domestic and international film festivals. He was the first Iranian film director to win an international prize after the 1979 revolution and has been awarded the Knight's Cross of the Order of Merit of the Republic of Poland.

== Biography ==
Khosrow Sinai was born on 19 January 1941 in Sari, Mazandaran Province in the north of Iran. He graduated in 1958 from Alborz High School in Tehran, and then went to Austria for further education. He spent four years studying Architecture at the Vienna University of Technology and three years study in music composition at the Vienna Academy of Music and Dramatic Arts. He graduated in music education from the Vienna Music Conservatory. Finally he graduated as cinema and television director (main study) and screenplay writing (subsidiary study) from Vienna Academy of Music and Dramatic Arts (with honors).

After these years of study he returned to Iran in 1967 and worked in the Ministry of Culture and Arts (till 1972), and as instructor in various universities in the fields of screenplay writing and documentary film until 1992.

He also worked in National Iranian Television (now called Seda o Sima) as producer, screenplay writer, director, and editor making about 100 short films, documentaries, and features. He is best known for his Avant-garde documentaries and also his unique style in docu-drama. He has been a juror in several national and foreign film festivals.

Though Sinai is mostly known for his films, he was also a skilful composer and accordion virtuoso, and had composed soundtracks for some of his own films.

== Filmography ==
"Arus-e Atash", (The Bride of Fire) was one of his most successful films in box office and won the people's choice award, and best screenplay at the 18th Fajr Film Festival. In addition, Sinai won a Crystal Globe at the Karlovy Vary International Film Festival.

Filmography of Khosrow Sinai
Year	Title	Notes
1977	Impressions of a City, Tehran Today	
1979	Long live (Persian: زنده باد, Zendeh bad)	
1980	Viva ...!	award winner in Karlovy Vary Film Festival
1983	The Inner Beast (Persian: هیولای درون, Hayula-ye darun)	2nd Fajr Festival as the best director
1983	The Lost Requiem (orig. title: Marsiye-ye gomshode, مرثیه گمشده)	Documentary film about Polish refugees in Iran.
1987	Going astray... (orig. Persian title: Yar dar khaneh..., ...یار در خانه, meaning "A friend at Home")	
1990	In the Alleys of Love	presented at the Un Certain Regard section at the 1991 Cannes Film Festival
1997	Autumn Alley	Premiered at the IDFA Film Festival in Amsterdam.
1999	The Bride of Fire	A film about the wedding traditions of southern Iranian tribes, that won several awards in both Iranian and international film festivals.
2005	Talking with a Shadow (Persian: Goftogu ba sayeh گفت و گو با سایه)	A documentary-drama film about Sadeq Hedayat (1903–1951).
2005	The Carpet, the Horse, the Turkoman (Persian: فرش، اسب، ترکمن, Farsh, asb, Torkaman)	
2006	The Desert of Blood (Persian: کویر خون, Kawir-e khun)	
2014	Rainbow Island (Persian: جزیره رنگین, Jazire-ye rangin)	

== Published books and screenplays ==
- The Man in White
- The Artists of a Bloodshedding Era
- The Bride of Fire (Film Script)
- The Post-communist Cinema (translated from English).
- The Lost Requiem
- Muds Blisters, poetry collection (1963)
- Translation from German: My Journey and Adventures in Iran, a book by Ármin Vámbéry (1863).

He has also written and translated numerous essays about cinema and other fine arts.

== Personal life ==
Sinai married the Hungarian painter, Gizella Varga Sinai, and Iranian painter Farah Ossouli. His three daughters are artists, and his one son is a scientist.

On 1 August 2020, Sinai died at the age of 79 from COVID-19 during the COVID-19 pandemic in Iran.

== See also ==
- Cinema of Iran
