= The Melody Haunts My Reverie =

Screen print by Roy Lichtenstein

- Artist: Roy Lichtenstein
- Year: 1965
- Movement: Pop art
- Dimensions: 61 cm × 76 cm (24 in × 30 in)

The Melody Haunts My Reverie is a 1965 screen print by Roy Lichtenstein, referencing Mitchell Parish's 1929 lyrics for the 1927 song "Stardust" by Hoagy Carmichael, and possibly rooted in the artist's love of jazz. The print was issued under the title Reverie.

The work was created as part of the portfolio, 11 Pop Artists, published by Original Editions in New York City, and printed at Knickerbocker Machine & Foundry Inc., also in New York. The complete portfolio consists of 33 prints by 11 artists and was issued in an edition of 200. Other works by Lichtenstein in the portfolio are Sweet Dreams, Baby!, 1965 and Moonscape, 1965. An impression of The Melody Haunts My Reverie sold at Sotheby's in 2016 for $137,500.

The woman in the image, holding a microphone, was likened to modern character of Betty Draper from Mad Men. The print was described as being among those that "don't lower art to the level of the comic strip but raise the comic strip to the level of high art".

== See also ==
- 1965 in art
