= Tehran Museum of Contemporary Art =

Museum in Tehran, Iran

- موزه هنرهای معاصر تهران

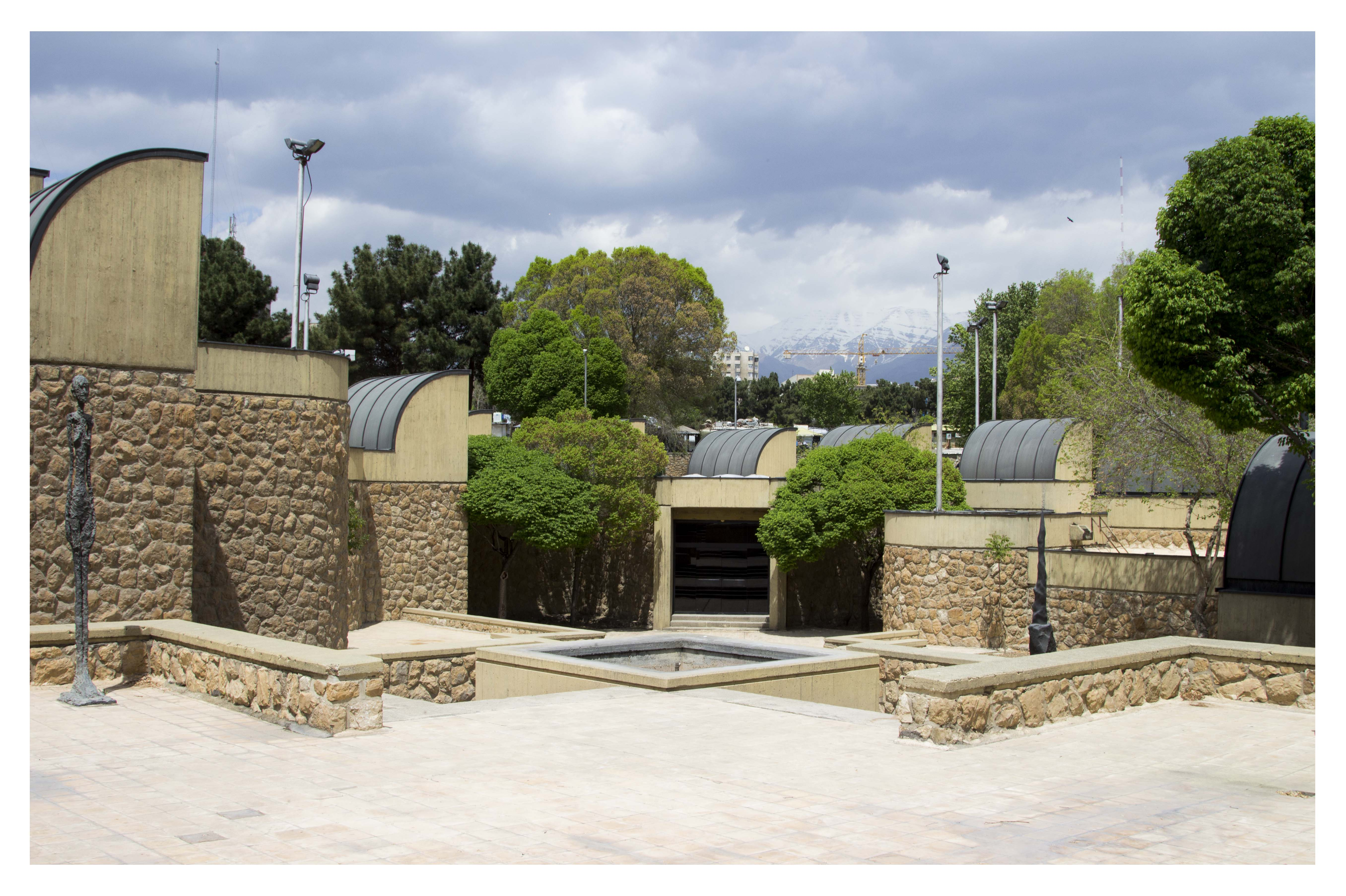

- Location within Tehran
- Established: 14 October 1977; 49 years ago
- Location: Laleh Park, Tehran, Iran
- Coordinates: 35°42′41″N 51°23′26″E
- Type: Art museum
- Director: Ebad Reza Eslami
- Curators: David Galloway, Kamran Diba (Both were first)
- Architects: Kamran Diba, Nader Ardalan
- Website: tmoca.com

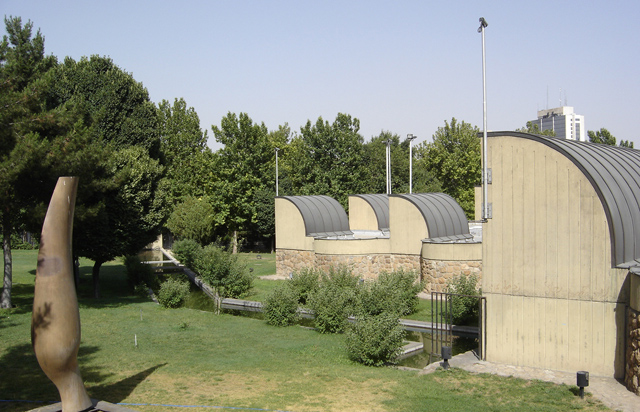
Garden of Sculptures, near the museum

Tehran Museum of Contemporary Art (Persian: موزه هنرهای معاصر تهران), also known as TMoCA, is among the largest art museums in Tehran and Iran. It has collections of more than 3,000 items that include 19th and 20th-century's world-class European and American paintings, prints, drawings, and sculptures. TMoCA also has a major collection of Iranian modern and contemporary art.

The museum was inaugurated by Shahbanu Farah Pahlavi (Persian: فرح پهلوی) in 1977, just two years before the 1979 Revolution. TMoCA is considered to have the most valuable collections of modern Western masterpieces outside Europe and North America.

== Background ==
According to Shahbanu Farah, the idea for the museum originated in a conversation at a gallery opening in the 1970s, when the artist Iran Darroudi mentioned her desire for a permanent place to exhibit works. The Tehran Museum of Contemporary Art was supposed to be a place to show contemporary and modern Iranian artists alongside other international artists doing similar work.

The museum was designed by Iranian architect and cousin of the empress, Kamran Diba, who employed elements from traditional Persian architecture of Yazd, Kashan, and other desert towns. Diba collaborated with architect Nader Ardalan during the design phase. It was built adjacent to Farah Park, renamed Laleh Park after the Islamic revolution, and was inaugurated in 1977. The building itself can be regarded as an example of contemporary art, in a style of an underground New York Guggenheim Museum. Most of the museum area is located underground with a circular walkway that spirals downwards with galleries branching outwards. Western sculptures by artists such as Ernst, Giacometti, Magritte, and Moore can be found in the museum's gardens.

The art selection was done under the office of Shahbanu Farah with a budget from the National Iranian Oil Company. The Shahbanu personally met many of the artists whose work was part of the museum collection, including the Western artists Marc Chagall, Salvador Dalí, Henry Moore, Paul Jenkins, Arnaldo Pomodoro. Some people involved in the process of selecting art were the Americans, Donna Stein and David Galloway, and Kamran Diba, the architect and director of the museum, and Karimpasha Bahadori, who was the Chief of Staff of the cabinet.

After the Iranian Revolution in 1979, the Western art was stored away in the museum's vault until 1999 when the first post-revolution exhibition was held of western art showing artists such as David Hockney, Roy Lichtenstein, Robert Rauschenberg and Andy Warhol. Now pieces of the Western art collection are shown for a few weeks every year but due to the current conservative nature of the Iranian establishment, most pieces are never shown.

It is considered to have the most valuable collection of Western modern art outside Europe and the United States, a collection largely assembled by founding curators David Galloway and Donna Stein under the patronage of Farah Pahlavi. It is said that there is approximately £2.5 billion worth of modern art held at the museum. The museum hosts a revolving program of exhibitions and occasionally organizes exhibitions by local artists.

Collection curator Donna Stein later wrote a memoir, The Empress and I: How an Ancient Empire Collected, Rejected and Rediscovered Modern Art (2021), because she felt she was not properly credited for her role in curating this collection.

== Politics ==
In 1977, Shahbanu Farah Pahlavi purchased expensive Western artwork in order to open the contemporary art museum. This was a controversial act due to rising social and economic inequalities. The authoritarian government was intolerant of the growing opposition, which, only a few years later, would overthrow the monarchy in the Iranian revolution. A few art pieces did not survive the revolution including a public statue by Bahman Mohasses deemed un-Islamic and a 1977 Warhol painting, a portrait of the Shahbanu.

Le Monde art critic André Fermigier wrote an article in 1977 called "A museum for whom and for what?", "questioning the link between an Iranian child and a Picasso or a Pollock". Farah Pahlavi responded to this criticism, noting that Iranians can understand modern art, not all Iranians were living in remote villages, and this issue with modern art was not unlike one that had existed in France.

A touring exhibition was planned for autumn 2016 in Berlin, (Germany), consisting of a three-month tour of sixty artworks, half Western and half Iranian. The show was to run for three months in Berlin, then travel to the Maxxi Museum of 21st Century Arts in Rome for display from March through August. However, the plan had to be postponed because the Iranian authorities had failed to allow the paintings to leave the country, also noting that, since the revolution, these paintings had not been shown in Iran. Finally, on 27 December 2016, a press release by Hermann Parzinger, the President of the organising committee, Berlin's Prussian Cultural Heritage Foundation (in German: Stiftung Preußischer Kulturbesitz Berlin), cancelled the exhibition altogether.

In 2017, the TMoCA unexpectedly staged a show in Tehran which included the very works which were selected to travel to Europe: Berlin-Rome Travellers, Selected Works of the Tehran Museum of Contemporary Art. It can be considered kind of an acte de résistance on the part of the museum director at the time, since, with the advent of Mahmoud Ahmadinejad, elected president of Iran in 2005, a harsh conservative wind has, to this day, blown away the relative openness and pragmatism of the Rafsanjani and Khatami eras.

== Permanent collection ==
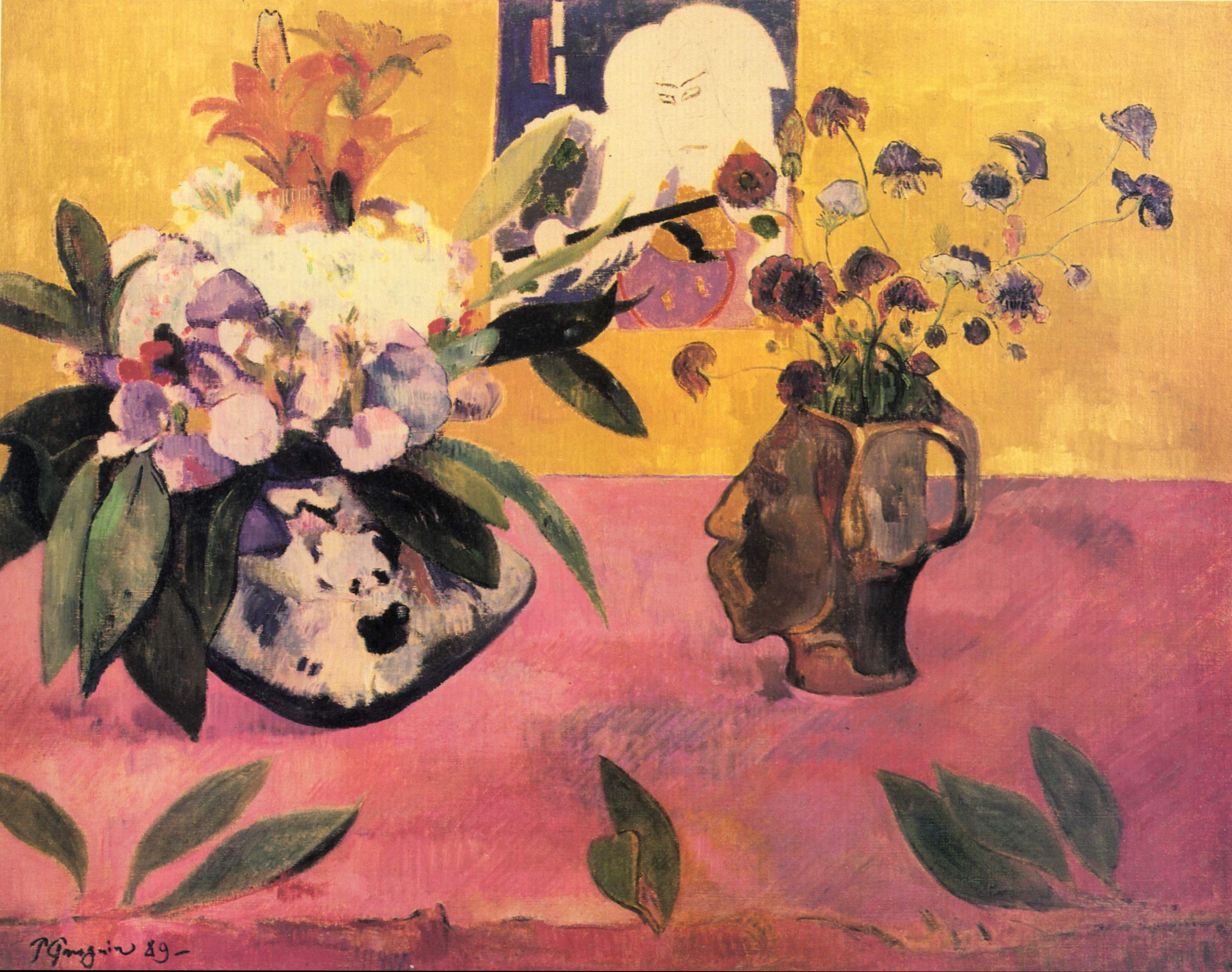
"Still Life with Head-Shaped Vase and Japanese Woodcut" (1889) by Paul Gauguin

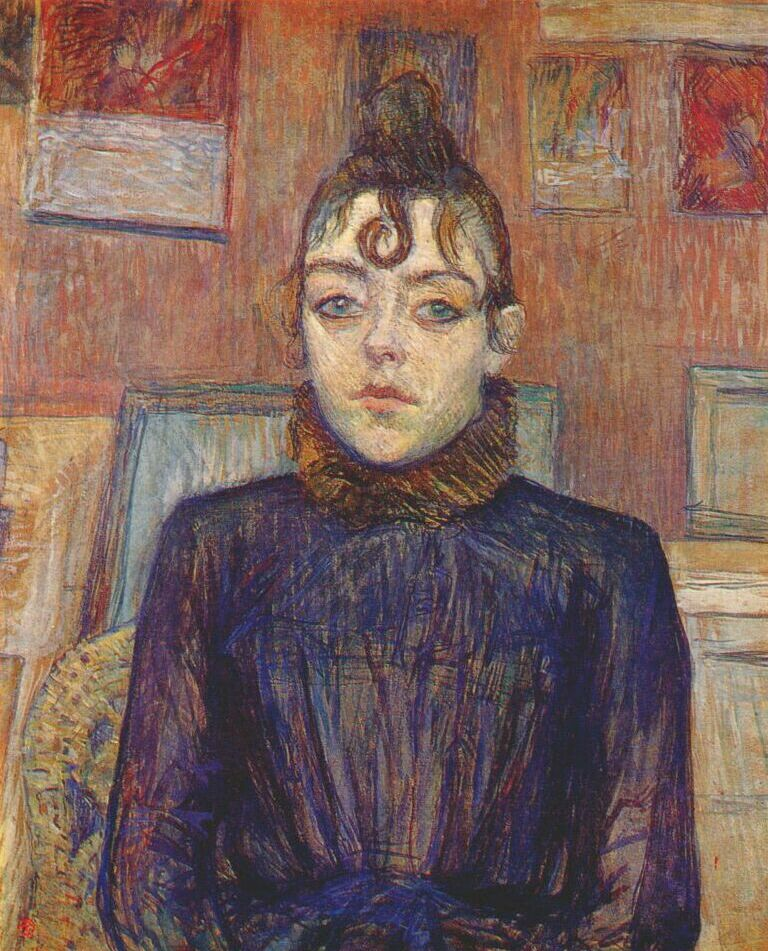
"Girl with Lovelock" (1889) by Henri de Toulouse-Lautrec

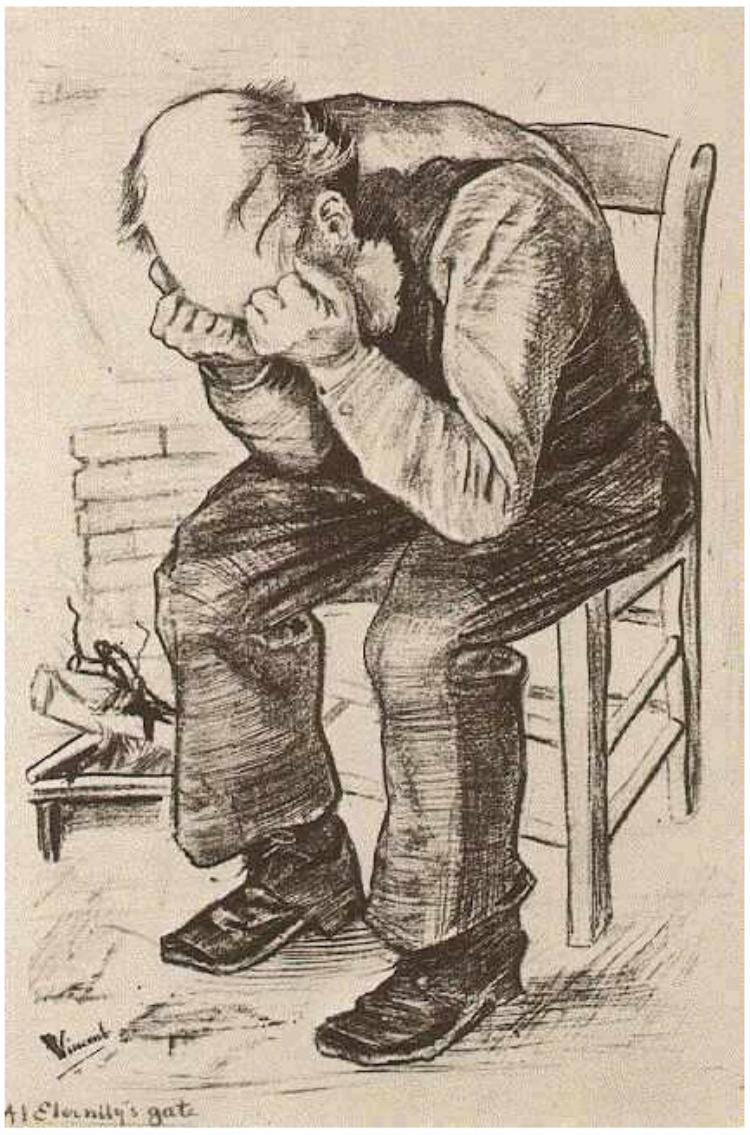
"Worn Out: At Eternity's Gate" by Vincent van Gogh, lithograph (1882)

This is a list of artists featured in the permanent collection at the Tehran Museum of Contemporary Art.

- Ansel Easton Adams: Canyon de Chelly
- Yaacov Agam: more than 10 oil and acrylic works
- Aydin Aghdashloo: Identity: in praise of Sandro Botticelli and other works
- Arman: Vagues après vagues
- John Baldessari: several conceptual photographic works
- Francis Bacon: a triptych, Two Figures Lying on a Bed With Attendants, 1968 ^{,}^{,} and Reclining man with sculpture, 1961
- Giacomo Balla: Futurist drawing, Figure in Movement, 1913
- Bernd and Hilla Becher: several photographic works
- Max Beckmann:
- Max Bill: Rhythmus im Raum (Multiplied by Space), red granite, 1947-1948
- Georges Braque: painting Guitare, Fruits et Pichet, 1927, and bronze sculpture Hymen, 1939-1957
- Alexander Calder: "The Orange Fish” mobile (aka “Ogunquit"), 1946, and Prickly Pear stabile, 1964
- Mary Cassatt: drypoint and aquatint print, Peasant Mother and Child, 1895
- Marc Chagall: Family With Cock
- Eduardo Chillida: Estela a Pablo Neruda (Homage to Pablo Neruda), 1974
- Christo and Jeanne-Claude: Scale model of "Wrapped Reichstag", 1977
- Salvador Dali:
- Edgar Degas: a version of his Dancers
- Willem de Kooning: Light in August, 1946
  - Note: Woman III, 1953, was de-accessioned and traded in 1994 for a rare 16th century Persian manuscript of the Tahmasbi Shahnameh, the Book of Kings, containing precious miniatures
- Robert Delaunay: lithograph from the Windows series, related to the painting La Fenêtre, 1912 (Musée de Grenoble)
- André Derain: Fauvist painting L'Âge d'or (Golden Age), 1905
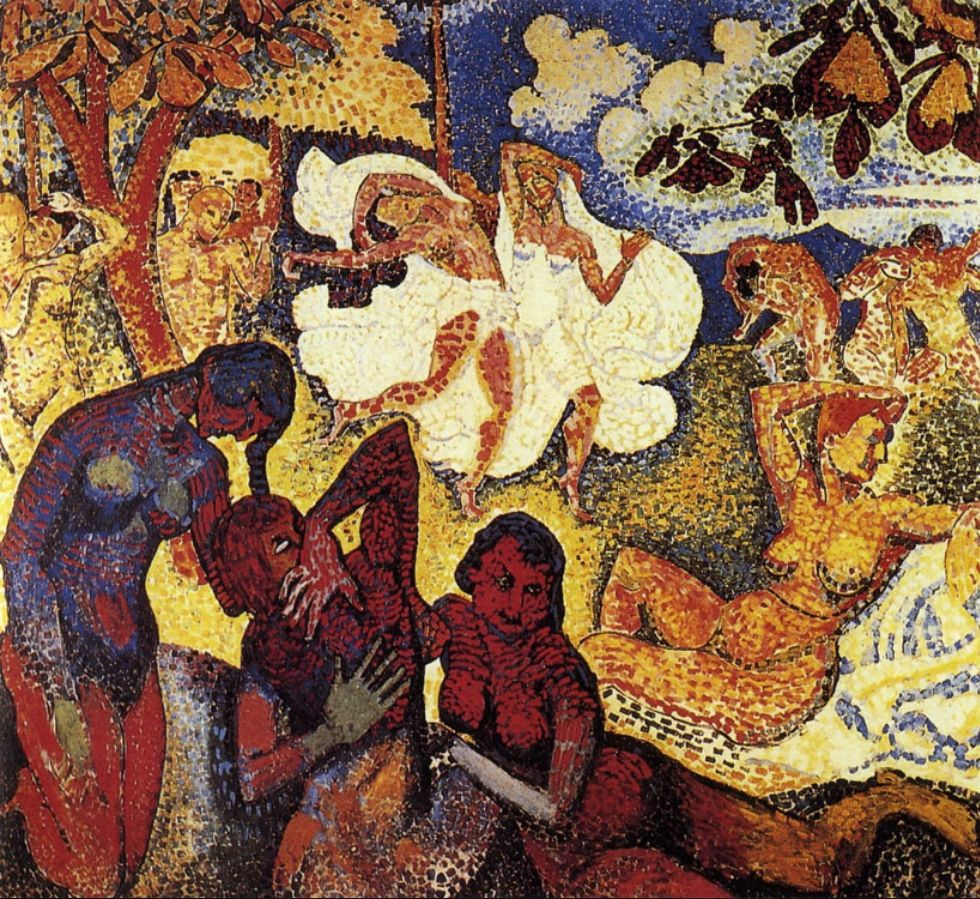
  "L'Âge d'Or" (1905) by André Derain
- Jim Dine:
- Jean Dubuffet: unknown title
- Marcel Duchamp: study (1911–13) for The Large Glass, 1915
- André Dunoyer de Segonzac:
- Don Eddy: Bumper Section XIII, 1970
- James Ensor: Mariage des Masques, 1926
- Max Ernst: Capricorn, 1944 and Histoire Naturelle, 1923
- Seyed Mohammad Ehsai: Calligraphy Painting Toranj?
- Parvaneh Etemadi: Vases, 1977
- Dan Flavin: Untitled, 1967
- William Henry Fox Talbot: photogenic drawing of a Single Fern, photographic negative print on salted paper, 1836-37
- Mansour Ghandriz: Untitled, 1963
- Paul Gauguin: Nature Morte à l’estampe japonaise (Still Life with Head-Shaped Vase and Japanese Woodcut), 1889
- Alberto Giacometti: 1 painting, Portrait of Isaku Yanaihara, 1960 and 4 bronze sculptures, a.o. Standing Woman I, 1960, La Cage, 1965-66 and Walking Man I, 1956-60
- Gilbert & George: Mental 6, 1976
- Adolph Gottlieb: Black & Black
- Marcos Grigorian: unknown title
- George Grosz: The Unexpected Guest
- Javad Hamidi: Composition
- Richard Hamilton:
- Duane Hanson: Boxers aka In Honor of Muhammad Ali, 1970
- Noriyuki Haraguchi: Matter and Mind aka Oil Pool
- David Hockney: Untitled
- Edward Hopper:
- Mehdi Hosseini: Untitled, 1976
- John Hoyland:
- Jasper Johns: Pinion and Passage 2, 1966
- Douglas James Johnson: The Shield of Achilles, 1975
- Donald Judd: Stacks
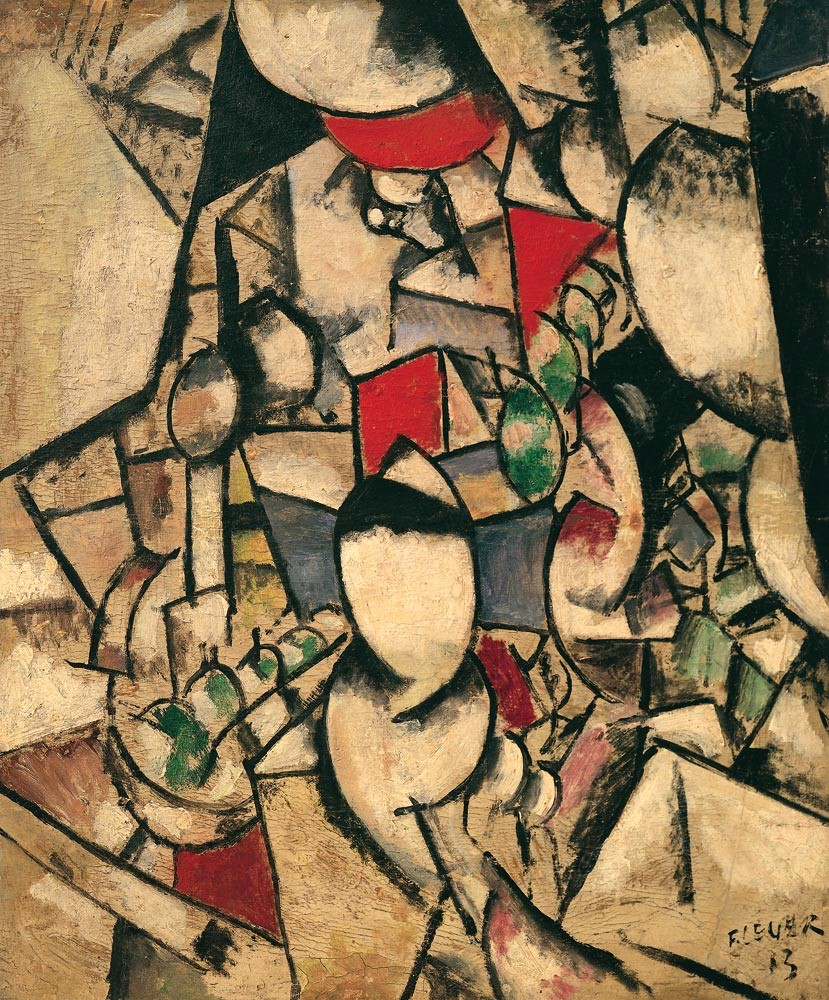
- "Paysage" (1913) by Fernand Léger
  Wassily Kandinsky: Tensions Claires, 1937
- Abbas Kiarostami:
- Franz Kline: Untitled, 1955
- František Kupka:
- Farideh Lashai: Composition, 1997
- Fernand Léger: Paysage (Landscape), 1913
- Sol LeWitt: Open Cube
- Roy Lichtenstein: The Melody Haunts My Reverie, 1965, Roto Broil, 1961, Brattata, 1962, and others
- Morris Louis: No.34, 1961
- René Magritte: Le Thérapeute aka The Healer (bronze sculpture), 1967 ^{,}
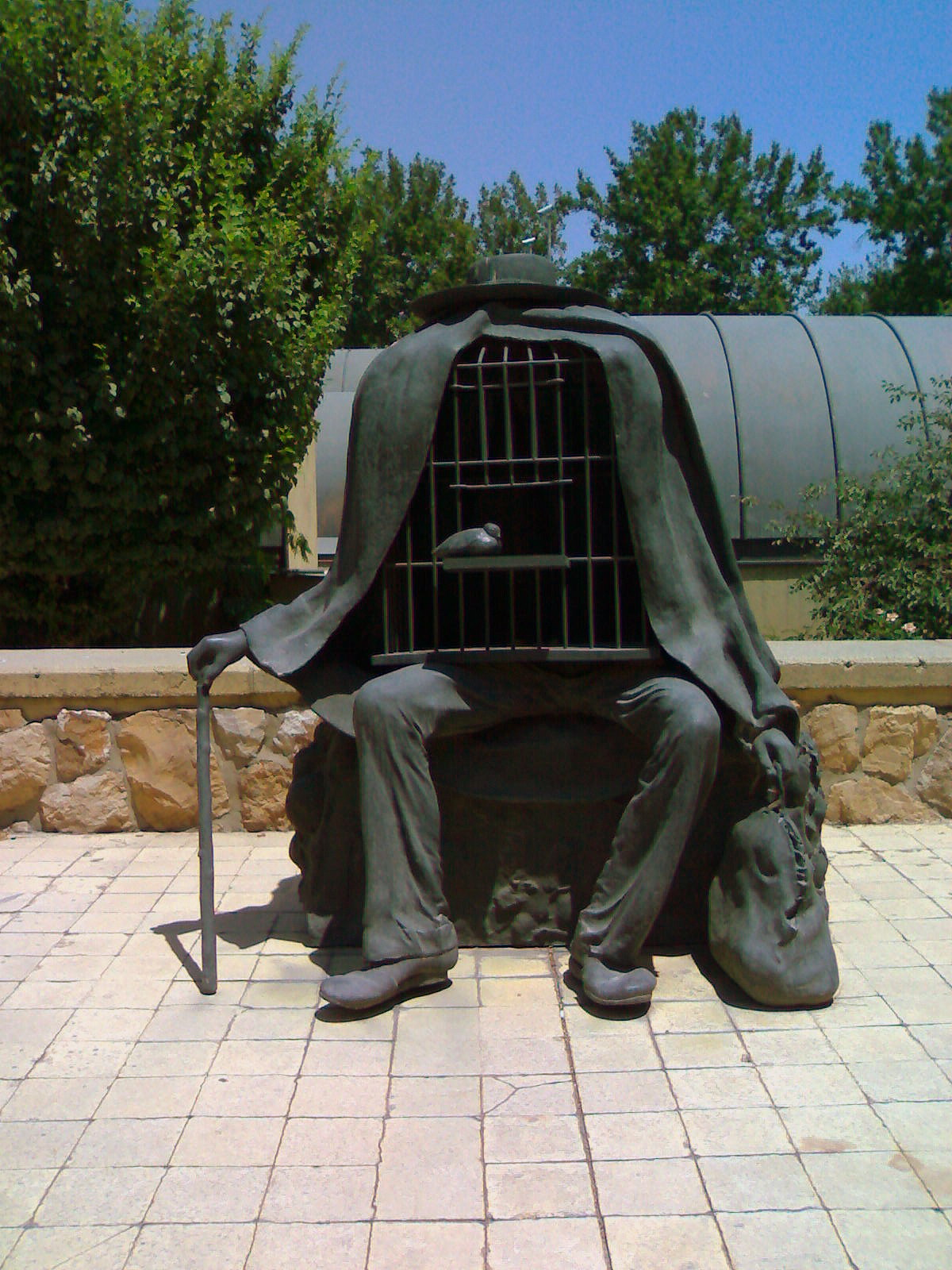
  "Le Thérapeute" (1967) by René Magritte
- Marino Marini: Horse and Rider (bronze sculpture)
- Leyly Matine-Daftary: Portrait of Nasrin, 1966
- Joan Miró: unknown title
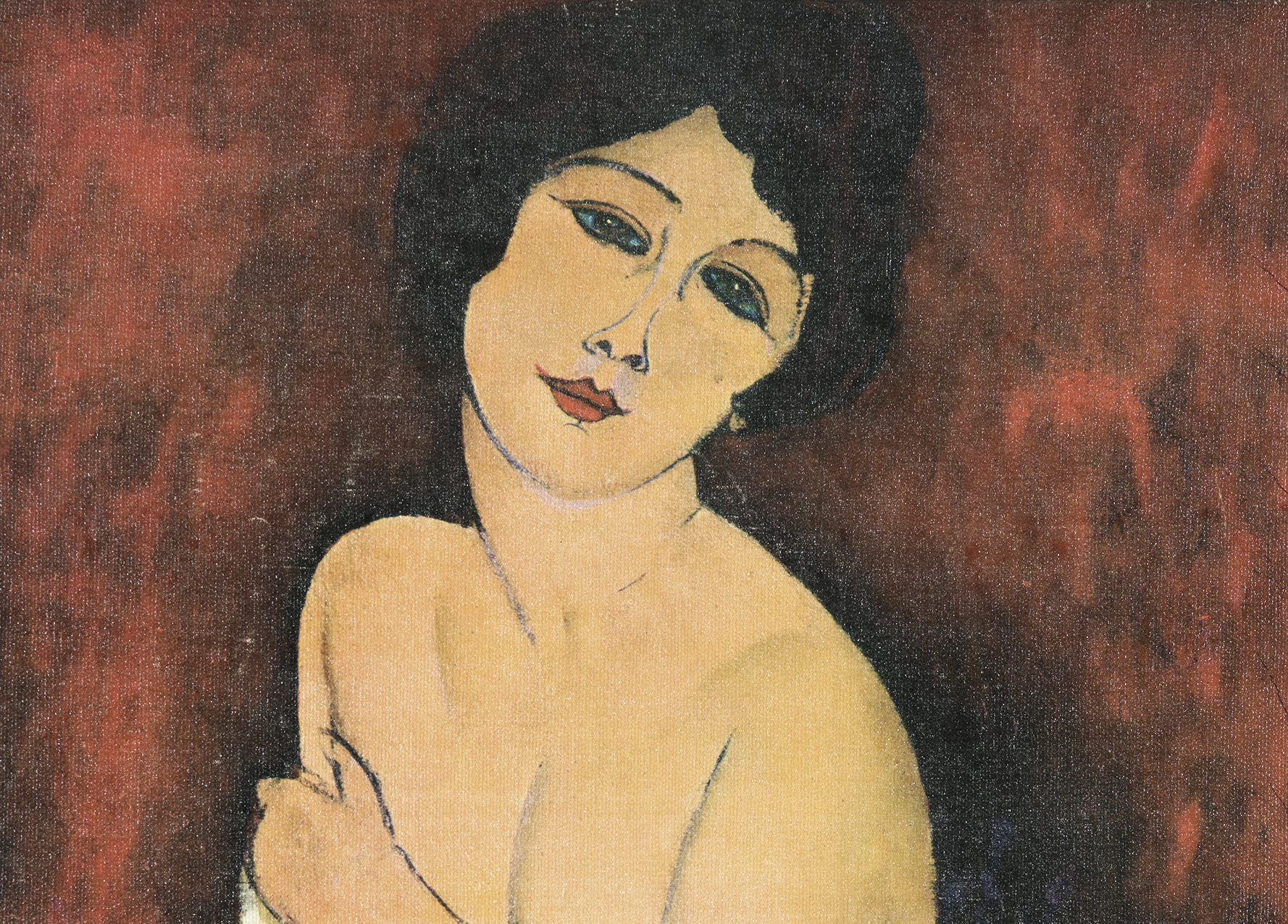
- "Untitled" by Amedeo Modigliani
  Amedeo Modigliani: Untitled
- Ahmad Mohammadpour: Calligraphy Painting
- Bahman Mohasses: Tryst, 1964 and Untitled, 1975
- Claude Monet: Vue de Giverny, 1886
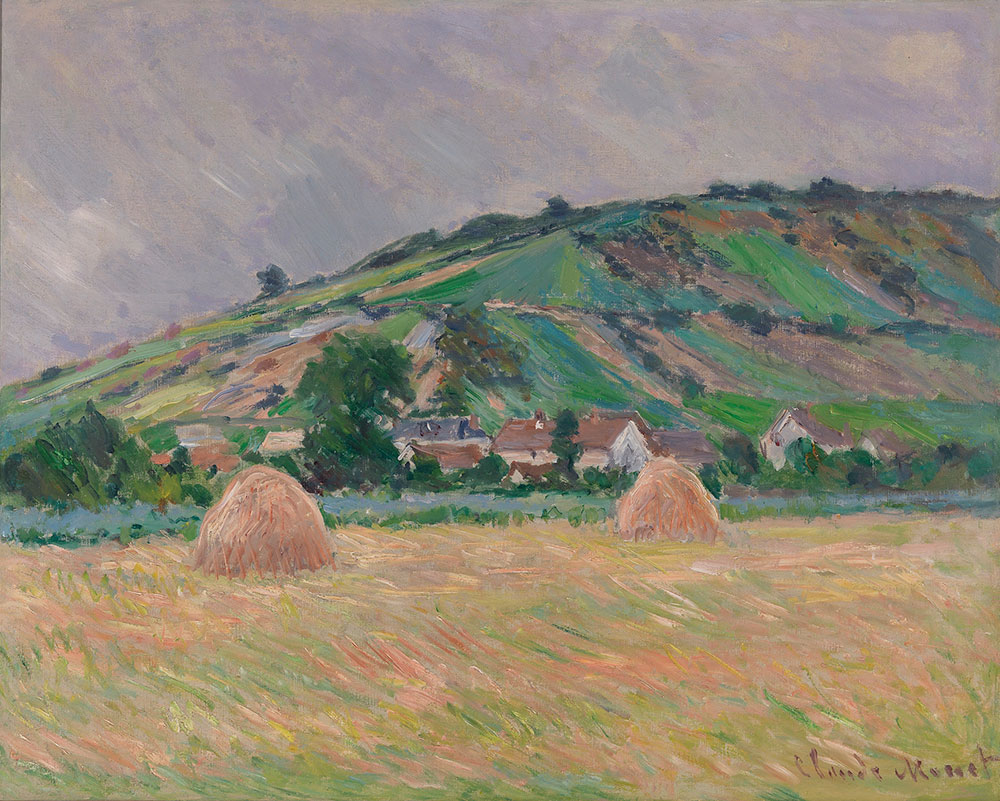
  "Vue de Giverny" (1886) by Claude Monet
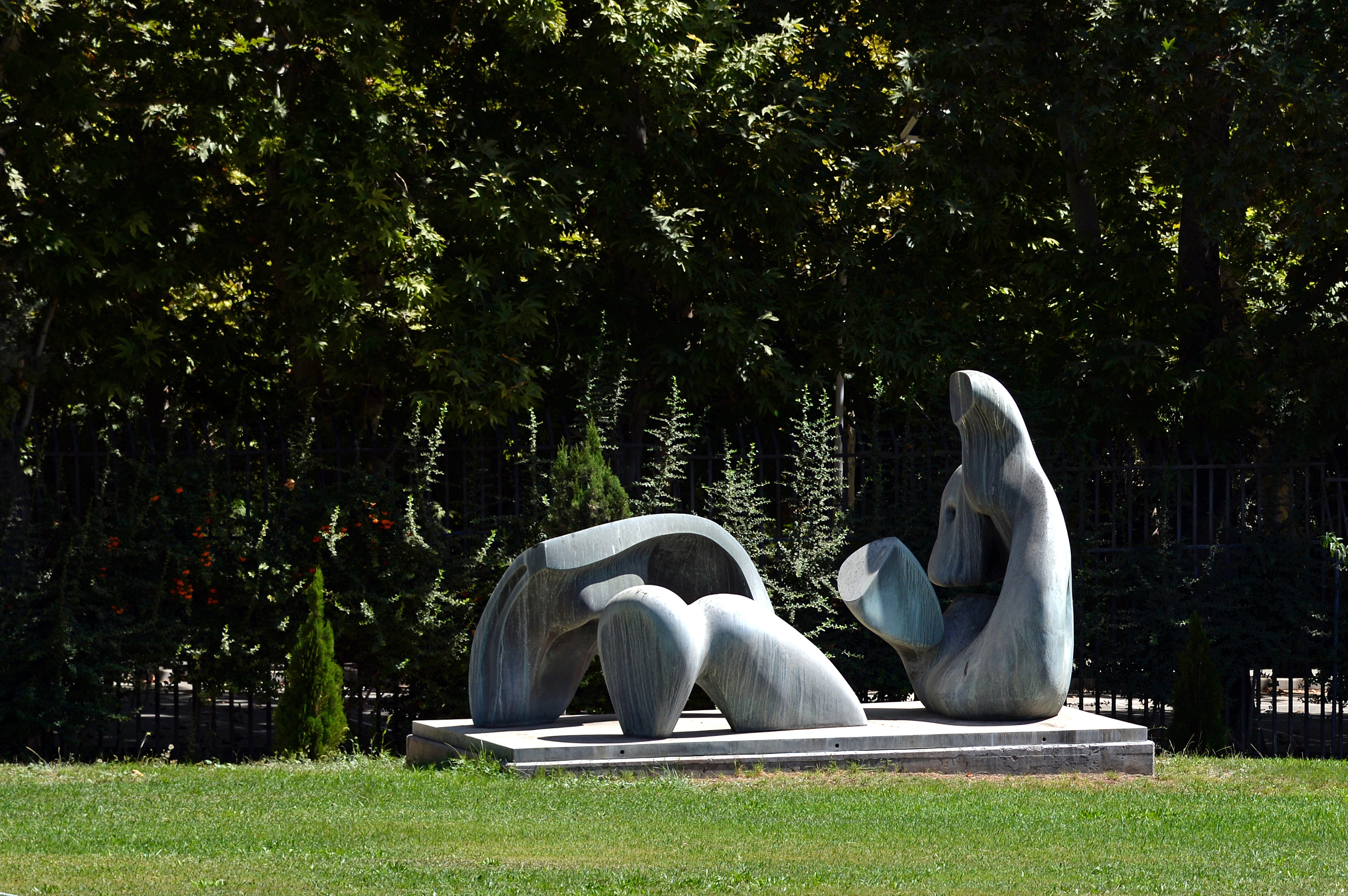
- "Three-Pieces Reclining Figure" (1968-69) by Henry Moore
  Henry Moore: bronze sculptures Two–Pieces Reclining Figure, 1969-70 Three–Pieces Reclining Figure, 1968-69 and Working Model for Oval with Points, 1968-69
- Giorgio Morandi:
- Noreen Motamed:
- Self-portrait (1895) by Edvard Munch, version of the Thiel gallery
  Edvard Munch: Self-portrait, 1895
- Jules Pascin:
- Peter Phillips:
- Pablo Picasso: Baboon and Young (bronze sculpture), Secrets (Confidences) or Inspiration (tapestry) and several paintings a.o. : The Painter and His Model, 1927 and Fenêtre ouverte sur la rue de Penthièvre, 1920
- Faramarz Pilaram: Calligraphic Painting, 1975
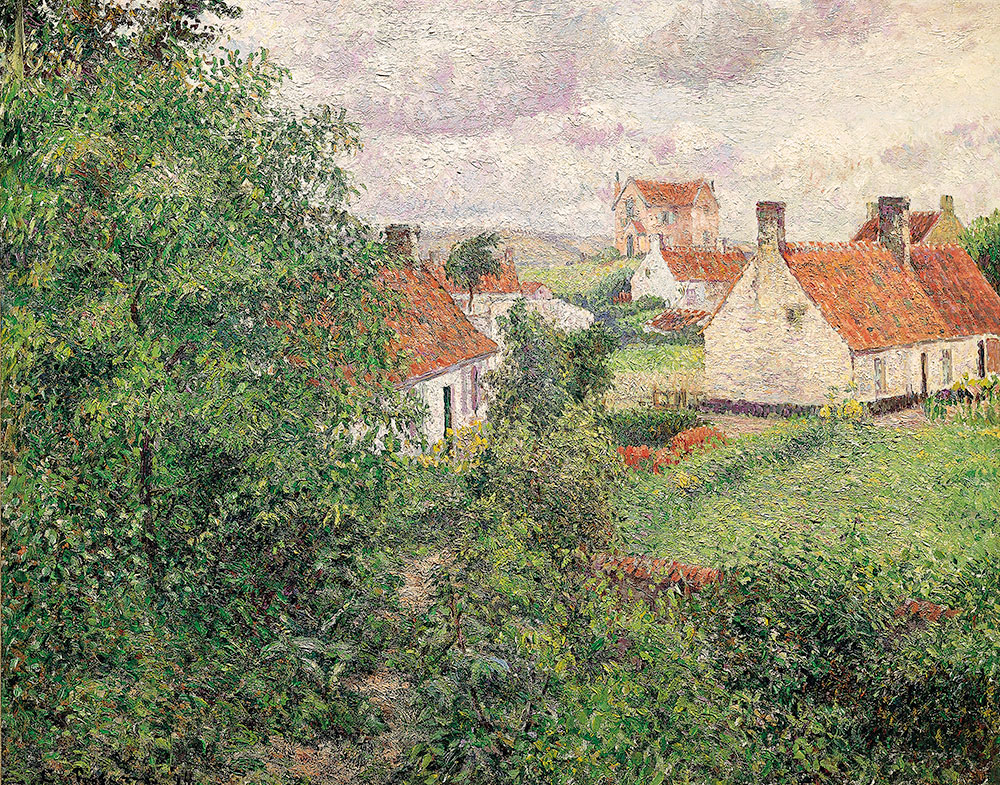
- "Houses at Knokke" (1894) by Camille Pissarro
  Camille Pissarro: Houses at Knokke, 1894
- Michelangelo Pistoletto: Green Curtain, 1967
- Jackson Pollock: Mural on Indian Red Ground, 1950
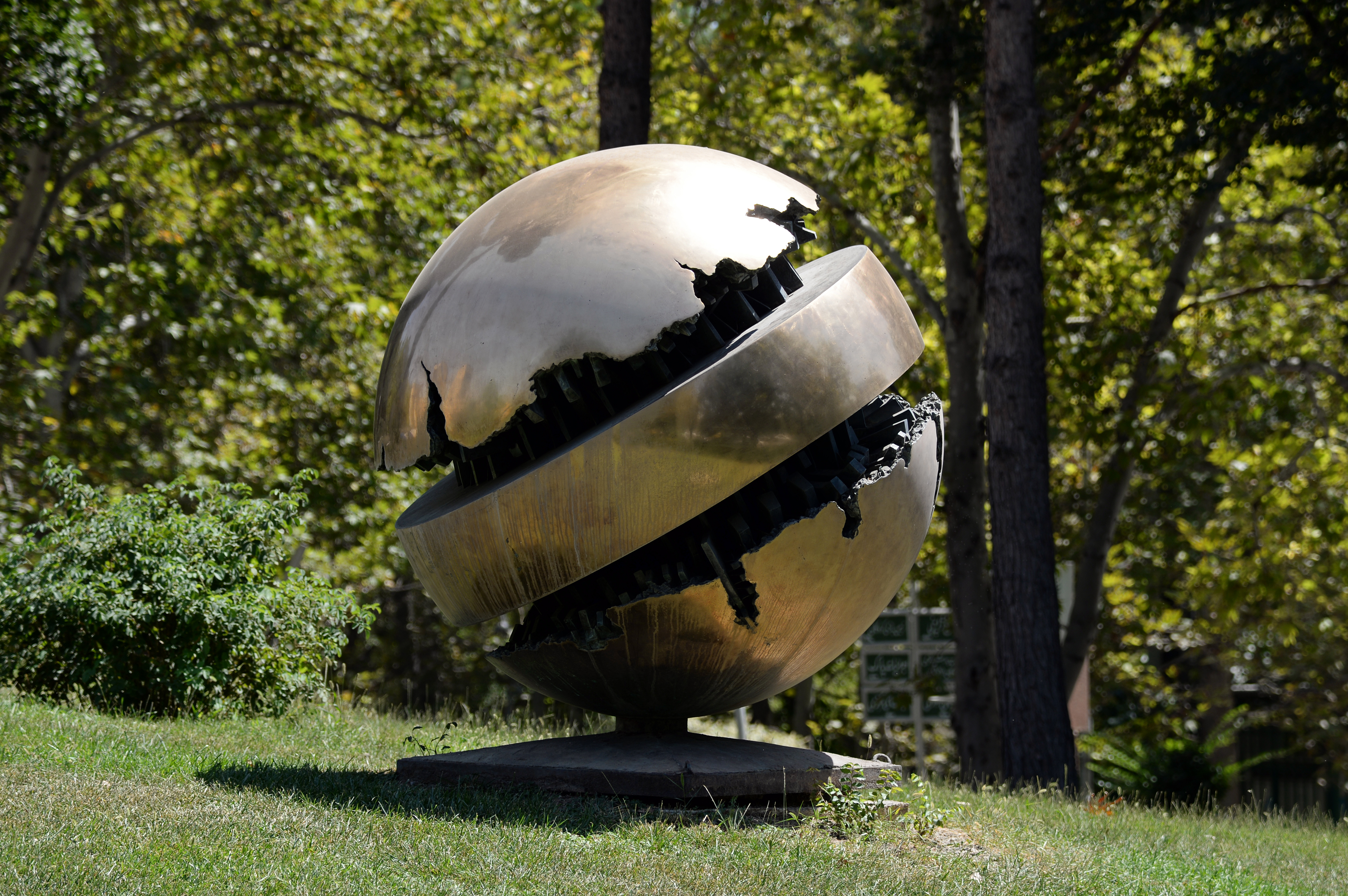
- "Rotante primo sezionale n. 3" (1967-1975) by Arnaldo Pomodoro
  Arnaldo Pomodoro: Rotante primo sezionale n. 3 (bronze sculpture), 1967-1975
- Maurice Prendergast:
- Robert Rauschenberg: Narcissus Convoy, 1977
- Man Ray: The Last Object, 1932-42 (Dada sculpture)
- Ad Reinhardt: Abstract Painting, 1962
- Pierre-Auguste Renoir: Gabrielle with Open Blouse, 1907
- Shokouh Riazi: Portrait of Dariush Eskandani
- Jean-Paul Riopelle: Baubess 11
- Diego Rivera:
- Henry Peach Robinson: Landing the Catch
- Mark Rothko: No. 2 (Yellow Center), 1954 , Sienna, Orange & Black on Dark Brown, 1962, and another painting similar to the latter
- James Rosenquist:
- Georges Rouault:
- Sterling Ruby:
- Edward Ruscha: Fruits
- Ali Akbar Sadeghi: Myth & Math, Piano War, 2011 and Unwritten
- Behjat Sadr: Untitled, 1967
- Abolghasem Saidi: Untitled, 1972
- Sohrab Sepehri: Trees
- Jesus Rafael Soto: Canada
- Robert Smithson: Rock Salt & Mirror
- Pierre Soulages: unknown title
- Frank Stella: Sinjerli Variations No 1-5, 1977
- Parviz Tanavoli: bronze sculptures Sanctified 1, 1976, Poet and the Lion Bone, 1969, another sculpture & Shirin and Farhad
- Henri de Toulouse-Lautrec: Girl with Lovelock (in French : Fille à l'Accroche-Cœur)
- William Turnbull:
- Cy Twombly: Untitled, 1963
- Suzanne Valadon: Untitled (pastel), 1909
- Louis Valtat:
- Kees van Dongen: Trinidad Fernandez, 1907
- Vincent van Gogh: lithograph of Worn Out : At Eternity's Gate, 1882, formerly in the Nelson Rockefeller Collection
- Victor Vasarely:
- Mohsen Vaziri-Moghaddam: Scratches on the Earth, 1963
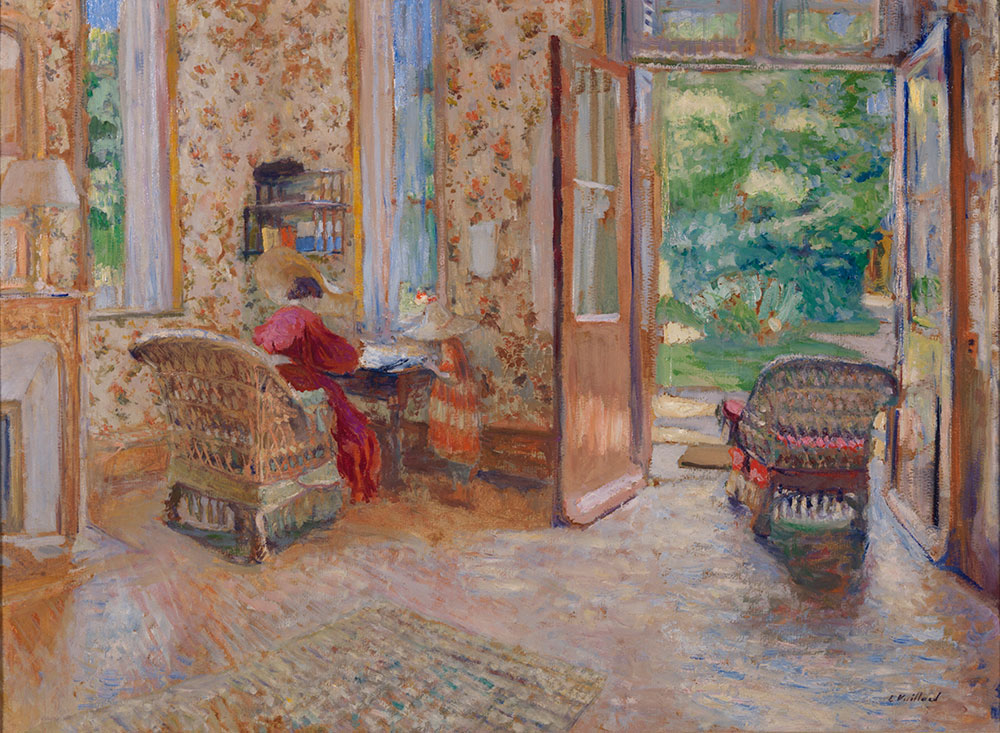
- "L'Entrée de la Ville" (1903) by Édouard Vuillard
  Édouard Vuillard: Entrance to the city, 1903
- Andy Warhol: Suicide (Purple Jumping Man), 1965, The American Indian, 1976, versions of Campbell's Soup Cans, 1968, and several portraits of Mick Jagger, 1975, Marilyn Monroe, 1967, Jacqueline Kennedy, 1966 and 10 versions of Mao Zedong, 1972.
- Tom Wesselmann: Great American Nude
- James McNeill Whistler:
- Fritz Winter:
- Manouchehr Yektai: Still Life, 1971-72
- Hossein Zenderoudi: Untitled, 1972
- Jalil Ziapour: Autumn Leaf or Zeynap Khatoun, 1962

== Temporary Exhibitions ==
- List of exhibitions from 1977 to 2011 (in French)
- A Manifestation of World Contemporary Art, 7 June 7 — 11 November 2010.
- Pop Art & Op Art exhibition, 2012.
- Rainbow, a retrospective exhibition of Otto Piene in collaboration with the Nationalgalerie Berlin, 24 Feb 2015 — 25 May 2015.
- Farideh Lashai - Towards the Ineffable, 21 Nov 2015 — 26 Feb 2016, co-curated by Iran’s Faryar Javaherian and Italy’s Germano Celant.
- Wim Delvoye at the Tehran Museum of Contemporary Art, 07 Mar 2016 — 13 May 2016.
- The Sea Suspended: Arab Modernism from the Barjeel Collection, 08 Nov 2016 — 23 Dec 2016, Barjeel Art Foundation.
- Berlin-Rome Travellers, Selected Works of the Tehran Museum of Contemporary Art, 07 Mar 2017 — 16 June 2017.
- Tony Cragg: Roots & Stones, 24 Oct 2017 — 12 Jan 2018.
- Portrait, Still Life, Landscape, 21 Feb — 20 April 2018, curated by Dutch architect Mattijs Visser.
- Above the Fields, 9 March — 5 May 2024, curated by Masiha Rabiei
- Adham Zargham: Memories of Nature, 15 May — 30 June 2024
- Eye to Eye, 6 October 2024 — January 2025, curated by Jamal Arabzadeh
- Picasso in Tehran, 12 March — 20 April 2025

== See also ==
- International rankings of Iran
- Safir Office Machines Museum
- Modern and contemporary art in Iran

== Documentary film ==
- ARD Iran-Correspondent Natalie Amiri: Der verborgene Schatz. Die legendäre Kunstsammlung des Iran (The Hidden Treasure. The Legendary Art Collection of Iran) | Arte, 2017, 55 min. (in German)

== Interviews ==
- Shahbanu Farah Pahlavi: the Empress of Iran talks about the legendary collection of modern and contemporary art assembled in the 1970s - Judith Benhamou-Huet Reports, 2019
- How Her Imperial Majesty Queen Farah Pahlavi Built an Art Empire - Vogue Arabia, 2020
- Donna Stein - Podcasts & Video on The Empress and I (donnasteiniran.com)
