= List of modern Arab scientists and engineers =

The following is a non-conclusive list of some notable modern Arab scientists and engineers. For medieval Arab scientists and scholars, see List of pre-modern Arab scientists and scholars

== A ==
- Ahmed Zewail, Egyptian-American chemist, 1999 Nobel Prize laureate.
- Abdullah bin Abdulaziz Al Rabeeah, Saudi pediatric surgeon specializing in the separation of conjoined twins.
- Ali Moustafa Mosharafa, Egyptian theoretical physicist.
- Ahmad Zaki Pasha, leading Egyptian philologist.
- Amin J. Barakat, Lebanese-American physician, known for the diagnosis Barakat syndrome.
- Abbas El Gamal, Egyptian electrical engineer, information theorist and the 2012 recipient of Claude E. Shannon Award
- M. Amin Arnaout, Lebanese physician-scientist and nephrologist, Professor of Medicine at Harvard Medical School.
- Ali Al-Wardi, Iraqi Social Scientist specialized in the field of Social history.
- Adah Almutairi, Saudi chemist and inventor, Professor of Pharmaceutical Chemistry at University of California.
- Ali H. Nayfeh, Palestinian-Jordanian-American mechanical engineer and the inaugural winner of the Thomas K. Caughey Dynamics Award.
- Abdul Jerri, Iraqi American mathematician.
- Ali Chamseddine, Lebanese physicist known for his contributions to particle physics, general relativity and mathematical physics.

== B ==
- Kamal Benslama, Moroccan-Swiss Experimental Particle Physicist. He is known for his contributions to the ATLAS Experiment at CERN. In 2020, he received the award "Alien of Extra-Ordinary Ability in Science" from the US Government.

== C ==
- Charles Elachi, Lebanese-American professor of electrical engineering and planetary science at the California Institute of Technology. Former Center Director of NASA.

== D ==
- Dennis W. Sciama, British physicist of Syrian descent. One of the fathers of modern cosmology. He was the PhD supervisor of over 70 students, including Stephen Hawking.
- Dina Katabi, Syrian-American Professor of Electrical Engineering and Computer Science at MIT.

== E ==
- Essam E. Khalil, Egyptian engineer and professor at Cairo University.
- Essam Heggy, Egyptian NASA scientist.
- Edward Said, Palestinian-Lebanese-American, a former professor of literature at Columbia University, a literary critic, and a founder of the academic field of postcolonial studies.
- Elias James Corey, Lebanese-American organic chemist. The recipient of 1990 Nobel Prize in Chemistry.

== F ==
- Frank Harary, American mathematician of Syrian descent; known as the father of the Modern Graph Theory. He invented the Signed graph.
- Farouk El-Baz, Egyptian American space scientist and geologist who worked with NASA.
- Fawwaz T. Ulaby, Syrian-American Professor of Electrical Engineering and Computer Science at the University of Michigan, 2006 recipient of IEEE Edison Medal.

== H ==
- Hassan Aref, Egyptian physicist and former professor at Virginia Tech.
- Hunein Maassab, Syrian-American professor of Epidemiology, inventor of Live attenuated influenza vaccine
- Hassan Kamel Al-Sabbah, Lebanese electrical and electronics research engineer, mathematician and inventor
- Huda Zoghbi, Lebanese geneticist and medical researcher, the recipient of 2016 Shaw Prize in medicine.
- Huda Akil, Syrian neuroscientist and a professor at the University of Michigan Medical School.
- Hassan K. Khalil, Egyptian-American scientist and a University Distinguished Professor at the Department of Electrical & Computer Engineering (ECE) of Michigan State University.

== I ==
- Ibrahim Abouleish, Egyptian professor and the L. Lau Chair in Electrical and Computer Engineering in the Edward S. Rogers Sr. Department of Electrical and Computer Engineering, University of Toronto

== J ==
- Jerrier A. Haddad, American computer engineer of Syrian descent. The co-developer and designer of the IBM 701 series which was IBM’s first commercial scientific computer and its first mass-produced mainframe computer.
- Jim Al-Khalili (CBE, FRS, HonFREng, FInstP) Iraqi-British theoretical physicist and science populariser. Professor of theoretical physics at University of Surrey.
- Joanne Chory, Lebanese-American plant biologist and geneticist. 2018 Breakthrough Prize laureate and winner of the 2019 Prince of Asturias Award for Technical and Scientific Research.
- Jorge Sahade, Argentine astronomer of Syrian descent. The first Latin American to become the president of the International Astronomical Union.

== L ==
- Lina J. Karam, Lebanese-American engineer and IEEE Fellow known for her contributions to signal processing, image/video processing and compression, computer vision and perceptual-based processing.

== M ==
- Mohammad S. Obaidat, Jordanian American computer scientist and scholar
- Mostafa El-Sayed, Egyptian chemical physicist, a nanoscience researcher, and a US National Medal of Science laureate.
- Michel Aflaq, Syrian philosopher, sociologist and Arab nationalist.
- Munir Nayfeh, Palestinian-American particle physicist, working in nanotechnology.
- Mario Hamuy – Chilian professor of astronomy of Syrian descent. He teaches at University of Chile.
- Mona Nemer, Lebanese Canadian scientist specializing in molecular genetics and cardiac regeneration who is Canada's Chief Science Advisor and a former Professor of Pharmacology at the University of Montreal.
- Mohamed Atalla, Egyptian engineer and physical chemist, inventor of the MOSFET (MOS transistor), and National Inventors Hall of Fame laureate.
- Mohamed Sanad, Egyptian antenna scientist and professor in the Faculty of Engineering, Cairo University.
- Ma Haide, Lebanese-American doctor who practiced medicine in China.
- Mourad Ismail, Egyptian mathematician, known for Rogers–Askey–Ismail polynomials, Al-Salam–Ismail polynomials and Chihara–Ismail polynomials
- Peter Medawar, Lebanese-British biologist, recipient of 1960 Nobel Prize in Medicine.
- Michael Atiyah, Lebanese-British leading mathematician of the 20 century. Recipient of both Fields Medal and Abel Prize.
- Magdi Yacoub, Egyptian-British cardiothoracic surgeon.

== N ==
- Nadia Awni Sakati, Syrian pediatrician known for Sakati–Nyhan–Tisdale syndrome, Sanjad-Sakati syndrome and Woodhouse-Sakati syndrome.

== O ==
- Omar M. Yaghi, Palestinian-American chemist, the recipient of the 2018 Wolf Prize in Chemistry.
- Omar Fakhri, Iraqi medical scientist.
- Oussama Khatib, Syrian roboticist and a professor of computer science at Stanford University.

== R ==
- Rachid Yazami, Moroccan engineer and scientist, and co-inventor of the lithium-ion battery.
- Rolando Chuaqui – Chilian mathematician of Syrian descent, spearheaded the creation and expansion of mathematics departments across multiple Chilean universities.
- Rachid Guerraoui, Moroccan computer scientist and a professor at the School of Computer and Communication Sciences at École Polytechnique Fédérale de Lausanne (EPFL), known for his contributions in the fields of concurrent and distributed computing. He is an ACM Fellow.

== S ==
- Saleh Ajeery, was a Kuwaiti astronomer, The Ojairi Calendar was issued in 1952, and Kuwait has since adopted it as the official calendar of the state.
- Salem Hanna Khamis, Palestinian economist and statistician known for the Geary-Khamis method of computing purchasing power parity of currencies.
- Shadia Habbal, Syrian-American astronomer and physicist who worked with NASA.
- Samir Amin, Egyptian-French Marxian economist.
- Steve Jobs, Syrian-American inventor, and industrial designer. He was the chairman, chief executive officer (CEO), and a co-founder of Apple Inc.

== T ==
- Taha Baqir, Iraqi archaeologist, linguist, historian, and former curator of the National Museum of Iraq.
- Taher Elgamal, Egyptian cryptographer known for his ElGamal discrete log cryptosystem and ElGamal signature scheme.
- Tony Fadell, Lebanese-American inventor, designer, and Computer Engineer. One of the co-inventors of the iPod and the iPhone.

== V ==
- Victor Assad Najjar, Lebanese pediatrician and microbiologist known for Crigler–Najjar syndrome

== W ==
- Waleed Al-Salam, Iraqi mathematician who introduced Al-Salam–Chihara polynomials, Al-Salam–Carlitz polynomials, q-Konhauser polynomials, and Al-Salam–Ismail polynomials.
- Wafaa El-Sadr, Egyptian physician, Professor at Columbia University.

== Y ==
- Yusuf Ibrahim (doctor), Egyptian physician known for Congenital cutaneous candidiasis.

== Z ==
- Zaha Hadid, Iraqi-British architect. The first woman to receive Pritzker Architecture Prize.
- Zoghman Mebkhout, French-Algerian mathematician known for his work in algebraic analysis, geometry, and representation theory.
- Zaki al-Arsuzi, Syrian philosopher, philologist, sociologist, historian, and Arab nationalist.

== See also ==
- List of pre-modern Arab scientists and scholars
