= Ismail polynomials =

In mathematics, Ismail polynomials may refer to one of the families of orthogonal polynomials studied by Mourad Ismail, such as:

- Al-Salam–Ismail polynomials
- Chihara-Ismail polynomials
- Rogers–Askey–Ismail polynomials
