= Hideaki =

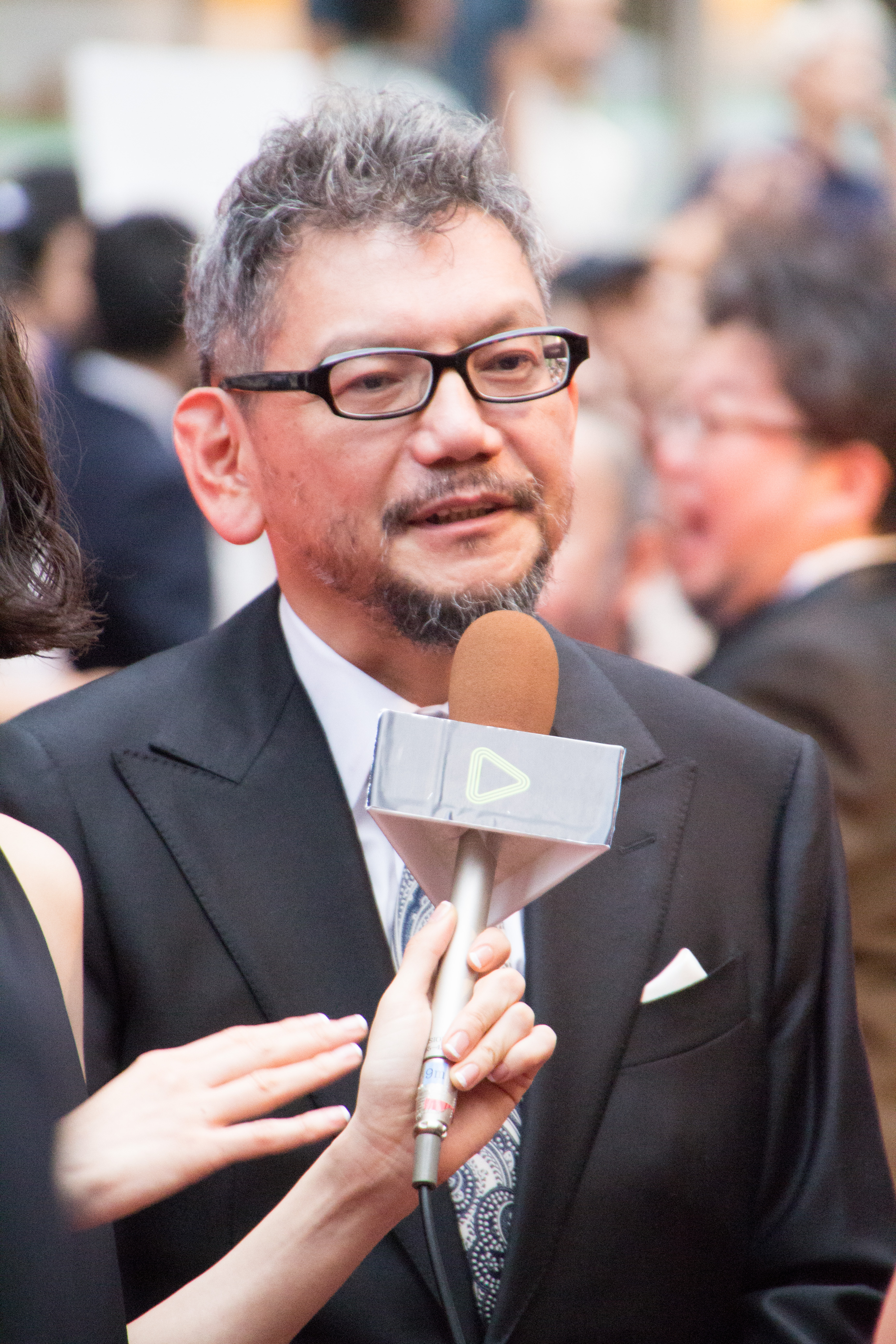
- Hideaki Anno, a Japanese animator, film director, and actor.
- Pronunciation: Hí-dè-à-kí. Can have different pronunciations depending on the language used.
- Gender: Male
- Language: Japanese

Origin
- Origin: Japan
- Meaning: Different meanings depending on the kanji used.

Other names
- Related names: Hideki, Hideo

Hideaki (ひであき) is a masculine Japanese given name.

== Written forms ==
Hideaki can be written using different kanji characters and can mean:

- 秀秋, "excellent", "autumn"
- 英秋, "outstanding", "autumn"
- 秀明, "excellent", "bright"
- 英明, "outstanding", "bright"
- 秀朗, "excellent", "clear"
- 秀昭, "excellent", "shining"
- 英昭, "outstanding", "shining"
- 秀章, "excellent", "composition"
- 秀聡, "excellent", "wise"
- 秀彰, "excellent", "clear"

A popular kanji is 明 (the combination of two different characters 日 = sun and 月 = moon) which means "the light coming from the sun", "sunlight and moonlight", "bright", "intelligent", "wisdom" or "truth".

The name can also be written in hiragana.

== People with the name ==
- Hideaki Aida (相田 秀晃; born 1943), Japanese rower
- Hideaki Akaiwa (born 1968), Japanese hero of the 2011 Tōhoku earthquake and tsunami
- Hideaki Anno (庵野 秀明; born 1960), Japanese animator and film director
- Hideaki Hagino (萩野 英明; born 1973), Japanese footballer
- Kobayakawa Hideaki (小早川 秀秋; 1577–1602), Japanese daimyō
- Iba Hideaki (伊庭秀明; 1648–1717), Japanese swordsman
- Hideaki Inaba (因幡 英昭; born 1944), Japanese powerlifter
- Hideaki Ishi (石 英明; born 1962), Japanese record producer and DJ Krush
- Hideaki Itsuno (伊津野 英昭; born 1971), Japanese video game director and designer
- Hideaki Itō (伊藤 英明; born 1975), Japanese actor
- Hideaki Kamei (亀井 秀明; born 1949), Japanese fencer
- Hideaki Kase (加瀬 英明; born 1936), Japanese diplomat
- Hideaki Kawamura (河村 英昭; born 1974), Japanese hurdler
- Hideaki Kikuchi (菊地 英昭; born 1964), Japanese guitarist
- Hideaki Kitajima (北嶋 秀朗; born 1978), Japanese footballer
- Hideaki Kobayashi (composer) (小林 秀聡; born 1973), Japanese composer
- Hideaki Kobayashi (diplomat) (小林 秀明; born 1945), Japanese diplomat
- Hideaki Kurokawa (黒川 秀明; born 1944), Japanese ice hockey player
- Hideaki Maeguchi (前口 英明; born 1960), Japanese rower
- Hideaki Matsuura (松裏 英明; born 1981), Japanese footballer
- Hideaki Miyamura (born 1955), Japanese-born American potter
- Hideaki Mori (森 秀昭; born 1972), Japanese footballer
- Hideaki Motoyama (本山 秀昭; born 1969), Japanese badminton player
- Hideaki Nitani (二谷 英明; 1930–2012), Japanese actor
- Hideaki Okabe (岡部 英明; born 1959), Japanese politician
- Hideaki Okubo (大久保 秀昭; born 1969), Japanese baseball player
- Hideaki Ōmura (大村 秀章; born 1960), Japanese politician
- Hideaki Ozawa (小澤 英明; born 1974), Japanese footballer
- Hideaki Sena (瀬名 秀明; born 1968), Japanese pharmacologist and writer
- Hideaki Sorachi (空知 英秋; born 1979), Japanese manga artist
- Hideaki Takatori (高取 秀明; born 1967), Japanese singer and composer
- Hideaki Takeda (武田 英明; born 1985), Japanese footballer
- Hideaki Takizawa (滝沢 秀明; born 1982), Japanese actor and singer
- Hideaki Tezuka (手塚 秀彰; born 1954), Japanese actor and voice actor
- Hideaki Tokunaga (德永 英明; born 1961), Japanese singer-songwriter and actor
- Hideaki Tominaga (富永 英明; born 1976), Japanese footballer
- Hideaki Tomiyama (富山 英明; born 1957), Japanese sport wrestler
- Hideaki Ueno (上野 秀章; born 1981), Japanese footballer
- Hideaki Utsumi (内海 秀明; born 1973), Japanese video game composer
- Hideaki Wakui (涌井 秀章; born 1986), Japanese baseball player
- Hideaki Yamada (山田 秀明; born 1960), Japanese cross-country skier
- Hideaki Yamazaki (山崎 秀晃; born 1987), Japanese kickboxer
- Hideaki Yanagida (柳田 英明; born 1947), Japanese sport wrestler

== Fictional characters ==
- Hideaki Kurashige (倉茂 秀明), a character in the manga series Miracle Girls
- Hideaki Mashimo (真下 ヒデアキ), a character in the anime series Digimon Fusion
- Hideaki Nakajima (中嶋 英明), a character in the manga series Gakuen Heaven
- Hideaki Tōjō (東条 秀明), a character in the manga series Ace of Diamond
- Hideaki Yoshizawa (吉沢 秀明), a character in the manga series Ace of Diamond
