= Al-Salam polynomial =

In mathematics, Al-Salam polynomials, named for Waleed Al Salam, may refer to:

- Al-Salam–Carlitz polynomials
- Al-Salam–Chihara polynomials
- Al-Salam–Ismail polynomials
