= Chihara =

Chihara is a surname. Notable people with the surname include:

- Charles Chihara (1932–2020), American philosopher
- Hideki Chihara (born 1957), Japanese composer
- Minori Chihara (born 1980), Japanese voice actress and J-pop singer
- Paul Chihara (born 1938), American composer
- Seiji Chihara (born 1963), Japanese rower
- Theodore Seio Chihara (1929–2026), American mathematician

== See also ==
- Chihara polynomials (disambiguation)
