= Chihara polynomials =

In mathematics, Chihara polynomials may refer to one of the families of orthogonal polynomials studied by Theodore Seio Chihara, including

- Al-Salam–Chihara polynomials
- Brenke–Chihara polynomials
- Chihara–Ismail polynomials
