= Intel Outstanding Researcher Award =

Award by Intel Corporation

The Intel Outstanding Researcher Award is presented by Intel Corporation for outstanding contributions to the development of advanced nanoelectronic and manufacturing technologies. The award was created to recognize truly outstanding contributions by researchers funded by Intel’s Corporate Research Council (previously the Semiconductor Technology Council) and associated Strategic Research Sectors (SRSs) and the inaugural awards were announced during 2012. In selecting the award winners, careful consideration is given to the fundamental insights, industrial relevance, technical difficulty, communications and potential student hiring associated with a candidate's research program.

== 2019 Recipients ==
Recipient	Affiliation	Country
Dan Jiao	Purdue University	USA
Reetuparna Das	University of Michigan	USA
Christopher Fletcher	University of Illinois at Urbana-Champaign	USA
Saibal Mukhopadhyay	University of Georgia	USA
Jian-Min Zuo	University of Illinois at Urbana-Champaign	USA
Thorsten Holz	Ruhr University, Bochum	Germany
Andre Seznec	INRIA	France

== 2017 Recipients ==
Recipient	Affiliation	Country
Chris Harrison	Carnegie Mellon University	USA
Ali Yilmaz	University of Texas at Austin	USA

== 2013 Recipients ==
Category	Recipient	Affiliation	Country
Device Reliability	Daniele Ielmini	Politecnico di Milano	Italy
Optoelectronics	Robert McLeod	University of Colorado at Boulder	USA
Photonics	Brian Corbett	Tyndall National Institute, UCC	Ireland

== 2012 Recipients ==
Category	Recipient	Affiliation	Country
Dielectric Characterisation	Paul Hurley	Tyndall National Institute, UCC	Ireland
Electroplating	Uziel Landau	Case Western Reserve University	USA
Emerging Research Devices	Jesus del Alamo	Massachusetts Institute of Technology	USA
High Volume Manufacturing	Lina Karam	Arizona State University	USA
Microsystems	Gabriel Rebeiz	University of California, San Diego	USA
Nanotechnology	Tsu-Jae King Liu	University of California, Berkeley	USA
Photolithography	Clifford L. Henderson	Georgia Institute of Technology	USA
Simulation and Metrology	Jim Greer	Tyndall National Institute, UCC	Ireland

== See also ==
- List of engineering awards
