= Francesco Tricomi =

Italian mathematician (1897–1978)

Francesco Giacomo Tricomi
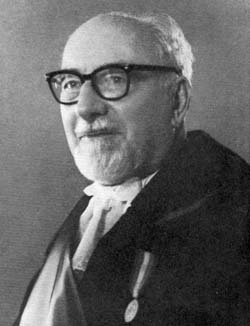
- Born: Francesco Giacomo Tricomi; 5 May 1897; Naples, Italy
- Died: 21 November 1978 (aged 81); Turin, Italy
- Education: University of Bologna; University of Naples
- Known for: Tricomi function Tricomi–Carlitz polynomial Euler–Tricomi equation
- Spouse: Susanna Fomm
- Scientific career
- Fields: Mathematics
- Workplaces: University of Padua; University of Rome; University of Florence; University of Turin

Francesco Giacomo Tricomi (5 May 1897 – 21 November 1978) was an Italian mathematician famous for his studies on mixed type partial differential equations. He was also the author of a book on integral equations.

== Biography ==
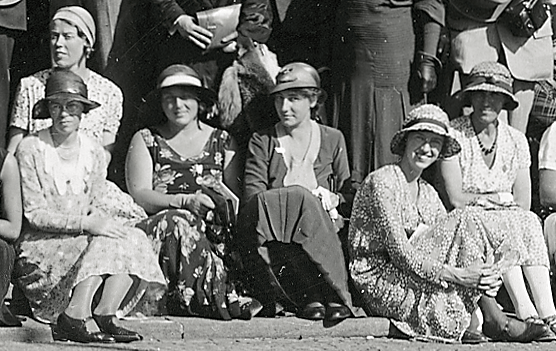
Ms. Tricomi (3rd from right) accompanied Francesco Tricomi at the ICM 1932.

Tricomi was born in Naples. He first enrolled in the University of Bologna, where he took chemistry courses. However, Tricomi realized that he preferred physics rather than chemistry; he moved to the University of Naples in 1915. He graduated at the University of Naples in 1918 and later was assistant to Francesco Severi, first in Padua and then in Rome. Later he was professor at Turin, called by Giuseppe Peano, a position he held until his retirement in 1967.

He was an Invited Speaker of the ICM in 1928 at Bologna and in 1932 in Zurich. From 1943 to 1945 and from 1948 to 1951 at the California Institute of Technology of Pasadena, he collaborated on the manual of special functions for the Bateman manuscript project, together with Arthur Erdélyi, Wilhelm Magnus and Fritz Oberhettinger.

Tricomi was a member of the Accademia nazionale dei Lincei and of the Accademia delle Scienze di Torino (Turin Academy of Sciences), of which he was also president.

== Selected publications ==
- Vorlesungen über Orthogonalreihen, Springer Verlag, Berlino, 1955 (traduzione di: Serie ortogonali di funzioni, Istituto Editoriale Gheroni, 1948)
- Integral Equations, Dover, New York, 1985, ISBN 0486648281; 1st edition. 1957.
- Equazioni differenziali, 3rd edition, Boringhieri, 1961 (translated by Elizabeth McHarg into English as Differential Equations. NY: Hafner. 1961.); 1st edition. Torino: G. Einaudi. 1948. 2nd edition. 1953.
- Carlo Ferrari e Francesco Giacomo Tricomi, Aerodinamica transonica, Cremonese, Roma, 1962 ISBN 8870833658
- Funzioni Analitiche, Nicola Zanichelli Editore, Bologna, 1961 (reprint of 2nd edn.); 1st edition. 1937. 2nd edition. 1946.
- Lezioni sulle funzioni ipergeometriche confluenti, Gheroni, Torino, 1952
- Funzioni ipergeometriche confluenti, Cremonese, Roma, 1954
- Funzioni ellittiche, Nicola Zanichelli Editore, Bologna, 1937
- Lezioni di analisi matematica, CEDAM, 1965, ISBN 8813319509
- Esercizi e complementi di analisi matematica, CEDAM, 1951
- Lezioni sulle equazioni a derivate parziali, Editrice Gheroni Torino, 1954
- Equazioni a derivate parziali, Edizioni Cremonese, Roma, 1957
- A. Erdélyi, W. Magnus F. Oberhettinger, F. G. Tricomi, Higher transcendental functions. (3 vols.), McGraw-Hill, New York, 1953 (fa parte del Bateman manuscript project)
- A. Erdélyi, W. Magnus F. Oberhettinger, F. G. Tricomi, Tables of integral transforms, McGraw-Hill, New York, 1954 (fa parte del Bateman manuscript project)
- Tricomi, Giacomo Francesco (1962), "Matematici italiani del primo secolo dello stato unitario" [Italian mathematicians of the first century of the unitary state], Memorie dell'Accademia delle Scienze di Torino. Classe di Scienze fisiche matematiche e naturali, Serie IV (in Italian), I: 120, Zbl 0132.24405.
- Tricomi, Giacomo Francesco (1962), "Matematici Bolognesi del secolo scorso" [Bolognese mathematicians of the last century], Atti della Accademia delle Scienze dell'Istituto di Bologna. Classe di Scienze fisiche. Rendiconti, Serie XI (in Italian), IX: 116–119, Zbl 0106.00302.
- Tricomi, Francesco Giacomo (1967), La mia vita di matematico attraverso la cronistoria dei miei lavori. (Bibliografia commentata 1916–1967), Padua: CEDAM – Casa Editrice Dott. Antonio Milani, pp. XII+172, ISBN 978-88-13-32679-1, MR 0274255, Zbl 0199.28603.

== See also ==
- Transonic
