= Special functions =

Mathematical functions having established names and notations

Special functions are particular mathematical functions that have more or less established names and notations due to their importance in mathematical analysis, functional analysis, geometry, physics, or other applications.

The term is defined by consensus, and thus lacks a general formal definition, but the list of mathematical functions contains functions that are commonly accepted as special.

== Tables of special functions ==
Many special functions appear as solutions of differential equations or integrals of elementary functions. Therefore, tables of integrals usually include descriptions of special functions, and tables of special functions include most important integrals; at least, the integral representation of special functions. Because symmetries of differential equations are essential to both physics and mathematics, the theory of special functions is closely related to the theory of Lie groups and Lie algebras, as well as certain topics in mathematical physics.

Symbolic computation engines usually recognize the majority of special functions.

=== Notations used for special functions ===
Functions with established international notations are the sine ($\sin$), cosine ($\cos$), exponential function ($\exp$), and error function ($\operatorname{erf}$ or $\operatorname{erfc}$).

Some special functions have several notations:

- The natural logarithm may be denoted $\ln$, $\log$, $\log_e$, or $\operatorname{Log}$ depending on the context.
- The tangent function may be denoted $\tan$, $\operatorname{Tan}$, or $\operatorname{tg}$ (used in several European languages).
- arctangent may be denoted $\arctan$, $\operatorname{atan}$, $\operatorname{arctg}$, or $\tan^{-1}$.
- The Bessel functions may be denoted
  - $J_n(x),$
  - $\operatorname{besselj}(n,x),$
  - ${\rm BesselJ}[n,x].$

Subscripts are often used to indicate arguments, typically integers. In a few cases, the semicolon (;) or even backslash (\) is used as a separator for arguments. This may confuse the translation to algorithmic languages.

Superscripts may indicate not only a power (exponent), but some other modification of the function. Examples (particularly with trigonometric and hyperbolic functions) include:

- $\cos^3(x)$ usually means $(\cos(x))^3$
- $\cos^2(x)$ is typically $(\cos(x))^2$, but never $\cos(\cos(x))$
- $\cos^{-1}(x)$ usually means $\arccos(x)$, not $(\cos(x))^{-1}$; this may cause confusion, since the meaning of this superscript is inconsistent with the others.

=== Evaluation of special functions ===
Most special functions are considered as a function of a complex variable. They are analytic; the singularities and cuts are described; the differential and integral representations are known and the expansion to the Taylor series or asymptotic series are available. In addition, sometimes there exist relations with other special functions; a complicated special function can be expressed in terms of simpler functions. Various representations can be used for the evaluation; the simplest way to evaluate a function is to expand it into a Taylor series. However, such representation may converge slowly or not at all. In algorithmic languages, rational approximations are typically used, although they may behave badly in the case of complex argument(s).

== History of special functions ==
=== Classical theory ===
While trigonometry and exponential functions were systematized and unified by the eighteenth century, the search for a complete and unified theory of special functions has continued since the nineteenth century. The high point of special function theory in 1800–1900 was the theory of elliptic functions; treatises that were essentially complete, such as that of Tannery and Molk, expounded all the basic identities of the theory using techniques from analytic function theory (based on complex analysis). The end of the century also saw a very detailed discussion of spherical harmonics.

=== Changing and fixed motivations ===
While pure mathematicians sought a broad theory deriving as many as possible of the known special functions from a single principle, for a long time the special functions were the province of applied mathematics. Applications to the physical sciences and engineering determined the relative importance of functions. Before electronic computation, the importance of a special function was affirmed by the laborious computation of extended tables of values for ready look-up, as for the familiar logarithm tables. (Babbage's difference engine was an attempt to compute such tables.) For this purpose, the main techniques are:

- numerical analysis, the discovery of infinite series or other analytical expressions allowing rapid calculation; and
- reduction of as many functions as possible to the given function.

More theoretical questions include: asymptotic analysis; analytic continuation and monodromy in the complex plane; and symmetry principles and other structural equations.

=== Twentieth century ===
The twentieth century saw several waves of interest in special function theory. The classic Whittaker and Watson (1902) textbook sought to unify the theory using complex analysis; the G. N. Watson tome A Treatise on the Theory of Bessel Functions pushed the techniques as far as possible for one important type, including asymptotic results.

The later Bateman Manuscript Project, under the editorship of Arthur Erdélyi, attempted to be encyclopedic, and came around the time when electronic computation was coming to the fore and tabulation ceased to be the main issue.

=== Contemporary theories ===
The modern theory of orthogonal polynomials is of a definite but limited scope. Hypergeometric series, observed by Felix Klein to be important in astronomy and mathematical physics, became an intricate theory, requiring later conceptual arrangement. Lie group representations give an immediate generalization of spherical functions; from 1950 onwards substantial parts of classical theory were recast in terms of Lie groups. Further, work on algebraic combinatorics also revived interest in older parts of the theory. Conjectures of Ian G. Macdonald helped open up large and active new fields with a special function flavour. Difference equations have begun to take their place beside differential equations as a source of special functions.

== Special functions in number theory ==
In number theory, certain special functions have traditionally been studied, such as particular Dirichlet series and modular forms. Almost all aspects of special function theory are reflected there, as well as some new ones, such as came out of monstrous moonshine theory.

== Special functions of matrix arguments ==
Analogues of several special functions have been defined on the space of positive definite matrices, among them the power function which goes back to Atle Selberg, the multivariate gamma function, and types of Bessel functions.

The NIST Digital Library of Mathematical Functions has a section covering several special functions of matrix arguments.

== Researchers ==
- George Andrews
- Richard Askey
- Harold Exton
- George Gasper
- Wolfgang Hahn
- Mizan Rahman
- Mourad E. H. Ismail
- Tom Koornwinder
- Waleed Al-Salam
- Dennis Stanton
- Theodore S. Chihara
- James A. Wilson
- Erik Koelink
- Eric Rains
- Arpad Baricz

== See also ==
- List of mathematical functions
- List of special functions and eponyms
- Elementary function
