= Hideo =

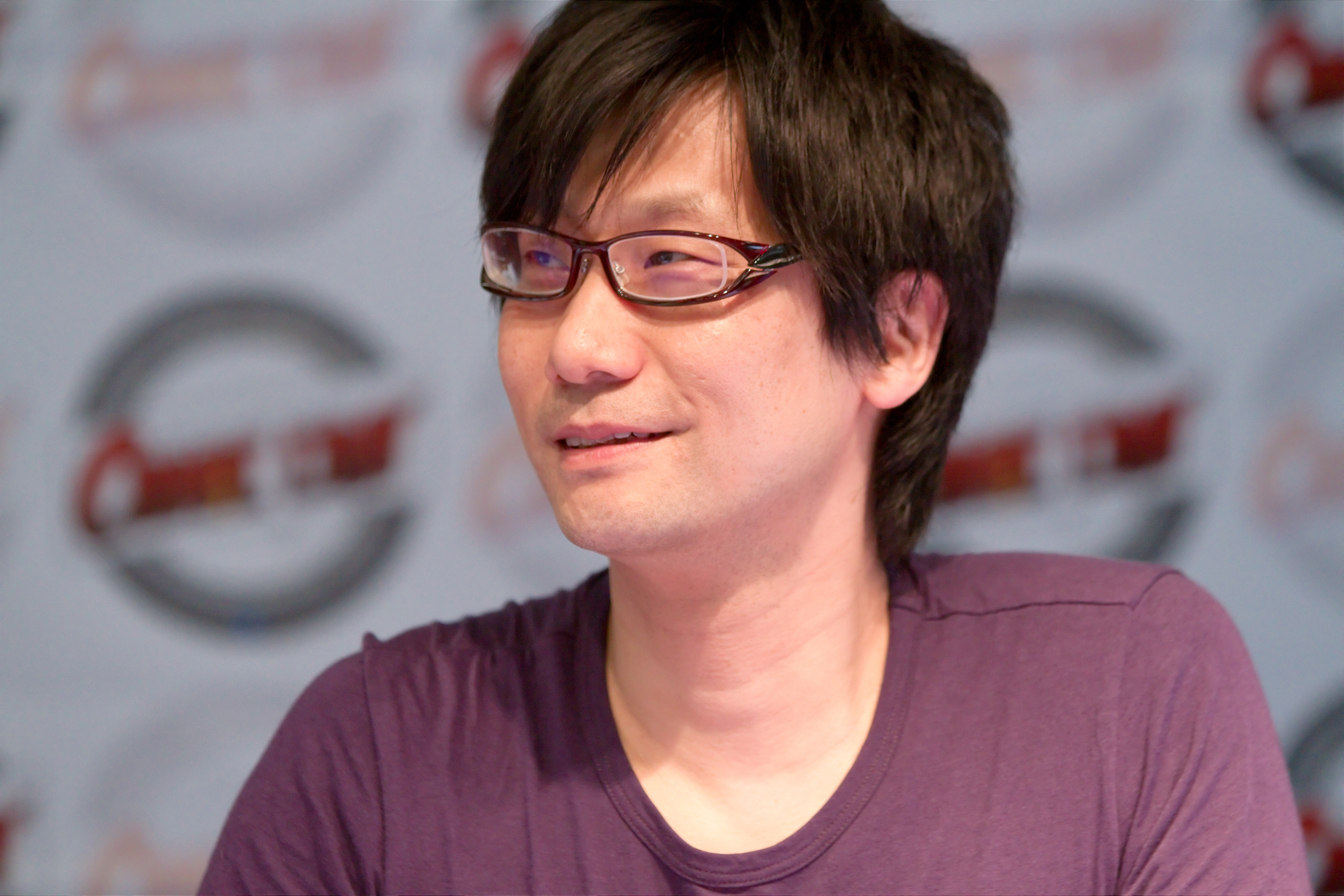
- Hideo Kojima, a Japanese video game designer, producer, screenwriter and director.
- Pronunciation: Hí-dè-ò. Can have different pronunciations depending on the language used.
- Gender: Male
- Language: Japanese

Origin
- Origin: Japan
- Meaning: Different meanings depending on the kanji used.

Other names
- Related names: Hideaki, Hideki

Hideo (ひでお) is a masculine Japanese given name. Notable people with the name include:

- Hideo Date (1907–2005), Japanese-born American painter
- Hideo Den (田 英夫, 1923–2009), Japanese politician and news presenter
- Hideo Fujimoto (藤本 英雄, 1918–1997), Japanese baseball player
- Hideo Fukui (福井 英郎, born 1977), Japanese athlete who competes in triathlon
- Hideo Fukuyama (福山 英朗, born 1955), Japanese NASCAR driver
- Hideo Gosha (五社 英雄, 1929–1992), Japanese film director
- Hideo Hagiwara (萩原 英雄, 1913–2007), Japanese artist
- Hideo Hamamura (浜村 秀雄; 1928–2000), Japanese marathon runner
- Hideo Hashimoto (橋本 英郎, born 1979), Japanese footballer
- Hideo Higashikokubaru (東国原 英夫, born 1957), Japanese comedian, best known for his role in Takeshi's Castle and the current governor of Miyazaki Prefecture
- Hideo Hiraoka (平岡 秀夫, born 1954), Japanese politician
- Hideo Iijima (飯島 秀雄; born 1944), Japanese sprinter and baseball player
- Hideo Ishikawa (石川 英郎, born 1969), Japanese voice actor
- Hideo Itokawa (糸川 英夫, 1912–1999), Japanese aerospace engineer
- Hideo Iwakuro (岩畔 豪雄, 1897–1970), World War II Imperial Japanese Army general
- Hideo Jinpu (神風 英男, born 1961), Japanese politician
- Hideo Kanaya (金谷 秀夫, 1945–2013), former Grand Prix motorcyclist
- Hideo Kanekawa (金川 英雄; born 1936), Japanese basketball player
- Hideo Kaneshiro (金城 秀雄), Japanese rugby union player
- Hideo Kanze (観世 栄夫, 1927–2007), Japanese actor
- Hideo Kobayashi (小林 秀雄; 1902–1983), Japanese writer
- Hideo Kobayashi (canoeist) (小林 英男; born 1943), Japanese sprint canoeist
- Hideo Kojima (小島 秀夫, born 1963), Japanese video game director
- Hideo Levy (リービ 英雄, born 1950), American-born Japanese language author
- Hideo Mizumori (水森 英夫), Japanese singer
- Hideo Mizuno (水野 英郎; born 1970), Japanese weightlifter
- Hideo Murai (村井 秀夫, 1958-1995), Japanese scientist
- Hideo Murata (村田英雄, 1929–2002), Japanese rōkyoku and enka singer
- Hideo Muraoka (村田英雄, 1929–2002), Brazilian-Japanese model
- Hideo Murota (室田 日出男, 1937–2002), Japanese actor
- Hideo Nagata (長田秀雄, 1885–1949), Japanese poet and playwright
- Hideo Nakata (中田 秀夫), Japanese film director
- Hideo Noda (野田 英夫; 1908-1939), American artist
- Hideo Nomo (野茂 英雄), Japanese baseball player
- Hideo Ochi (越智秀男, born 1940), Japanese Karate master
- Hideo Oe (大江 英雄; born 1944), Japanese rower
- Hideo Ogata (尾形英夫, 1934–2007), Japanese anime film producer
- Hideo Oguma (小熊秀雄, 1901–1940), Japanese author
- Hideo Ohba (大庭 英雄, 1910–1986), Japanese martial artist
- Hideo Okamoto (岡本 秀雄; born 1948), Japanese rower
- Hideo Ōshima (大島 秀夫, born 1980), Japanese football player
- Hideo Otake (大竹 英雄, born 1942), Japanese Go player
- Hideo Sakaki (榊 英雄, born 1970), Japanese actor
- Hideo Sakamaki, president of Nomura Securities between 1991–1997
- Hideo Sakurai (桜井 秀男; born 1948), Japanese ice hockey player
- Hideo Sasaki (1919–2000), American landscape architect
- Hideo Sasayama (笹山 秀雄; born 1966), Japanese sport wrestler
- Hideo Seaver, American voice actor
- Hideo Shima (島 秀雄; 1901–1998), Japanese engineer
- Hideo Suzuki, several people
- Hideo Tanaka (disambiguation), several people
- Hideo Tanifuji (谷藤 秀夫; born 1949), Japanese cross-country skier
- Hideo Tokoro (born 1977), Japanese martial artist
- Hideo Urabe (浦辺 秀夫; born 1951), Japanese ice hockey player
- Hideo Usui (born 1939) (臼井 日出男), Japanese politician
- Hideo Watanabe (渡辺 秀央, 1934–2024), Japanese politician
- Hideo Yamaki (山木 秀夫; born 1952), Japanese jazz musician
- Hideo Yamamoto (山本 英夫, born 1968), Japanese manga artist
- Hideo Yoritaka (頼高 英雄, born 1963), Japanese politician
- Hizeo Yoshimura (1922-1995), better known as Pops Yoshimura, Japanese motorcycle tuner and factory Suzuki team owner
- Hideo Yoshino (吉野 秀雄, 1902–1967), Japanese tanka poet
- Hideo Yoshizawa (吉沢 秀雄), Japanese video game developer and director
- Hideo Yoshizawa (footballer) (吉澤 英生; born 1971), Japanese footballer and manager

== Fictional characters ==
- Hideo Kuze, character from the anime Ghost in the Shell: S.A.C. 2nd GIG
- Hideo Minagawa, character from the anime Initial D Fifth Stage

== See also ==
- 6345 Hideo, a main-belt asteroid
