= Hideki =

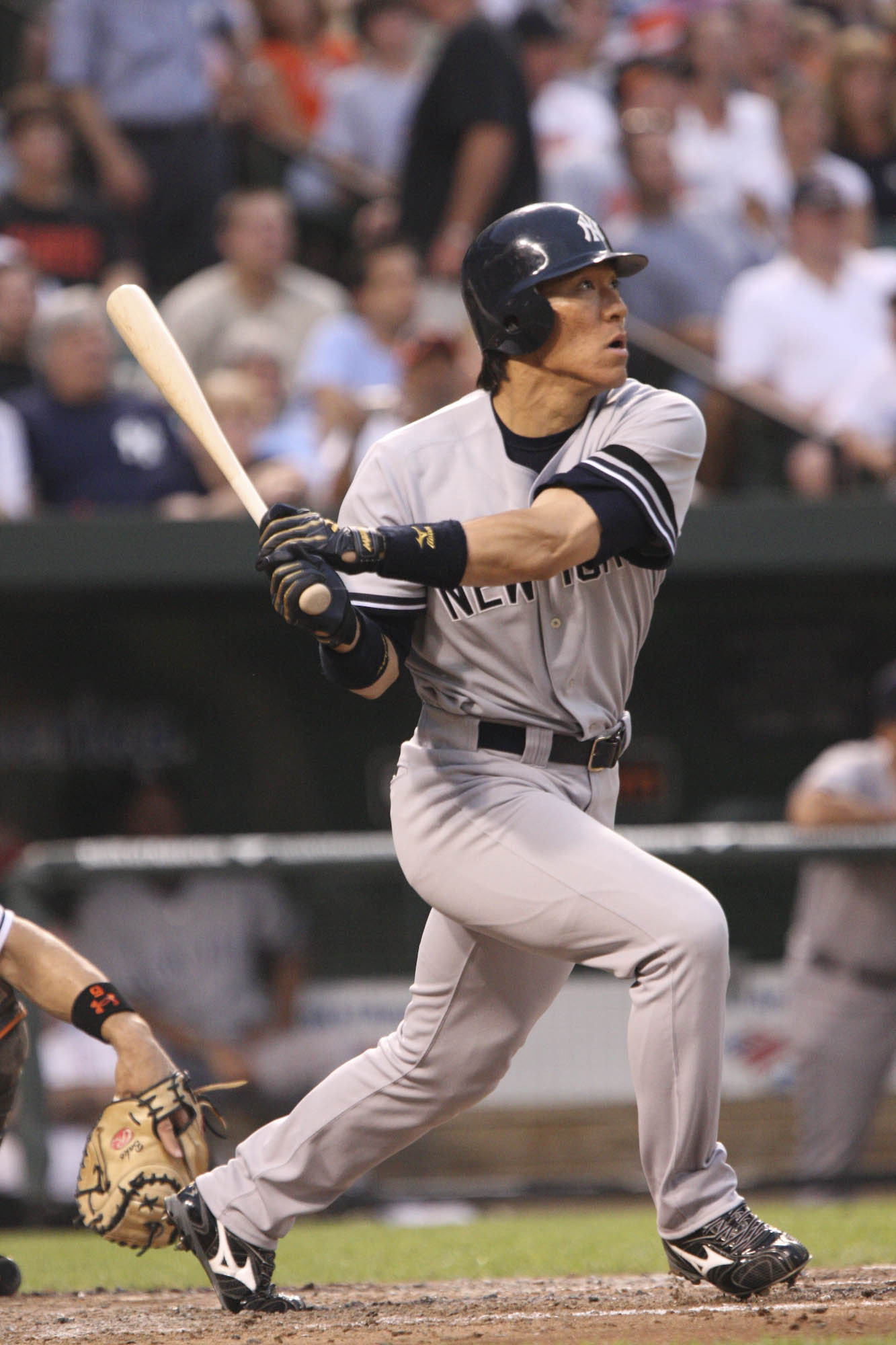
- Hideki Matsui, a Japanese baseball player
- Pronunciation: Hí-dè-kí. Can have different pronunciations depending on the language used.
- Gender: Male
- Language: Japanese

Origin
- Origin: Japan
- Meaning: It can have many different meanings depending on the kanji used.

Other names
- Related names: Hideaki, Hideo

Hideki (ひでき, ヒデキ) is a common masculine Japanese given name.

== Written forms ==
Hideki can be written using different kanji characters and can mean:

- 秀樹, "excellence", "timber trees"
- 英樹, "superior", "timber trees"
- 英機, "superior", "chance"
- 秀喜, "excellence", "pleasure"
- 秀紀, "excellence", "chronicle"
- 英輝, "superior", "brightness"
- 英希, "superior", "hope"

The name can also be written in hiragana or katakana.

== People with the name ==
Notable people with the name include:

- Hideki Arai (新井 英樹; born 1963), Japanese manga artist
- Asanoyama Hideki (朝乃山 英樹; born 1994), Japanese sumo wrestler
- Hideki Chihara (千原 英喜; born 1957), Japanese composer
- Hideki Fujii (藤井 秀樹; 1934–2010), Japanese photographer
- Hideki Fujisawa (藤沢 秀樹; born 1963), also known as Dance☆Man, Japanese musician
- Hideki Hamaguchi (浜口 秀樹; born 1956), Japanese basketball player
- Hideki Hosaka (保坂 秀樹; 1971–2021), Japanese professional wrestler
- Hideki Imai (今井 秀樹; born 1943), Japanese information theorist and cryptographer
- Hideki Imamura (今村 栄喜; born 1972), Japanese musician, co-founder and vocalist of the band Siam Shade
- Hideki Irabu (伊良部 秀輝; 1969–2011), Japanese professional baseball player who played in both Japan and the United States
- Hideki Ishige (石毛 秀樹; born 1994), Japanese footballer
- Hideki Ishima (石間 秀機; born 1944), Japanese musician
- Hideki Kadowaki (門脇 英基; born 1976), Japanese mixed martial artist
- Hideki Kamiya (神谷 英樹; born 1970), Japanese video game designer
- Hideki Kase (加瀬 秀樹; born 1959), Japanese professional golfer
- Hideki Kita (喜多 秀喜; born 1952), retired Japanese long-distance runner
- Hideki Komatsu (小松英樹; born 1967), Japanese Go player
- Hideki Maeda (前田 秀樹; born 1954), Japanese footballer and manager
- Hideki Makihara (牧原 秀樹; born 1971), Japanese politician
- Hideki Matsui (松井 秀喜; born 1974), Japanese baseball player
- Hideki Matsutake (松武 秀樹; born 1951), Japanese electronic musician
- Hideki Matsuoka (松岡 秀樹; born 1968), Japanese Go player
- Hideki Matsuyama (松山 英樹; born 1992), Japanese golfer
- Hideki Mitsui (三井 秀樹; born 1963), Japanese screenwriter
- Hideki Miyazaki (宮崎 秀基; born 1962), Japanese Nordic combined skier
- Hideki Mori (森 秀樹; born 1961), Japanese manga artist
- Hideki Murai (村井 英樹; born 1980), Japanese politician
- Hideki Mutoh (武藤 英紀; born 1982), Japanese race car driver
- Hideki Nagai (永井 秀樹; born 1971), Japanese footballer and manager
- Hideki Nagano (永野 英樹; born 1968), Japanese classical pianist
- Hideki Naganuma (長沼 英樹; born 1972), Japanese video game music composer
- Hideki Nakano (中野 秀樹; born 1952), Japanese Nordic combined skier
- Hideki Nanba (難波 英樹; born 1974), Japanese rugby union player
- Hideki Niwa (丹羽 秀樹; born 1972), Japanese politician
- Hideki Niizuma (新妻 秀規; born 1970), Japanese politician
- Hideki Noda (野田 英樹; born 1969), Japanese racing driver
- Hideki Noda (playwright) (野田 秀樹; born 1955), Japanese actor, playwright and theatre director
- Hideki Okada (岡田 秀樹; born 1958), Japanese racing driver
- Hideki Okajima (岡島 秀樹; born 1974), Japanese baseball player
- Hideki Omoto (大元 英照; born 1984), Japanese rower
- Hideki Saijo (西城 秀樹; 1955–2018), Japanese singer and television celebrity
- Hideki Sakamoto (坂本 英城; born 1972), Japanese music composer
- Hideki Seo (瀬尾 英樹; born 1974), Japanese-born fashion designer
- Hideki Shingō (新郷 英城; 1911–1982), Japanese fighter pilot officer
- Hideki Shirakawa (白川 英樹; 1936–2026), Japanese chemist and winner of the 2000 Nobel Prize in Chemistry
- Hideki Sunaga (須永 英輝; born 1985), Japanese baseball player
- Hideki Suzuki (鈴木 秀樹; born 1980), Japanese professional wrestler
- Hideki Tachibana (橘 秀樹), Japanese writer and anime director
- Hideki Takahashi (高橋 英樹; born 1944), Japanese actor
- Hideki Tasaka (田坂 秀樹; born 1975), Japanese voice actor
- Hideki Todaka (戸高 秀樹; born 1973), Japanese boxer
- Hideki Togi (東儀 秀樹; born 1959), Japanese composer, gagaku musician, and actor
- Hideki Tojo (東條 英機; 1884–1948), Japanese Prime Minister during World War II
- Hideki Uchidate (内舘 秀樹; born 1974), Japanese footballer
- Hideki Yamauchi (山内 英輝; born 1988), Japanese racing driver
- Hideki Yuasa (湯浅 秀樹; born 1964), Japanese naval officer
- Hideki Yukawa (湯川 秀樹; 1907–1981), Japanese theoretical physicist and the first Japanese Nobel laureate

== Fictional characters ==
- Hideki Motosuwa (本須和秀樹), a character in the manga series Chobits
- Hideki, a character in the anime series Devil Hunter Yohko
- Hideki Go, the alter ego of Ultraman Jack from the 1971 tokusatsu film The Return of Ultraman
- Ryūga Hideki (流河 旱樹), an alias for L from the manga Death Note
- Hideki Nishimura, a character in the light novel series And You Thought There Is Never a Girl Online?
- Hideki Kurohagi, the secondary antagonist of the anime miniseries Marvel Anime: Wolverine
