= Essam Khalil =

Essam Khalil may refer to:

- Essam E. Khalil, Egyptian mechanical engineer and professor
- Essam Khalil (politician), Egyptian businessman and politician
