= Kraska =

Kraska may refer to:

== People ==
- Jakub Kraska (born 2000), Polish swimmer
- James Kraska, American specialist in public international maritime law
- Jerzy Kraska (born 1951), Polish footballer
- Kamil Kraska (born 1998), Polish kickboxer
- Tim Kraska, German computer scientist
- Waldemar Kraska (born 1963), Polish politician

== Places ==
- Kraska, Podlaskie Voivodeship, village in Poland
- Kraška Vas, village in Slovenia
