= Joseph Konhauser =

American mathematician

Joseph D. E. Konhauser (1924 – February 1992) was an American mathematician who introduced Konhauser polynomials. He was a professor at Macalester College. He also organized many mathematical problems competitions. The annual Konhauser Problemfest is named after him.

== Publications ==
- Konhauser, Joseph D. E.; Velleman, Daniel J.; Wagon, S. (1996), Which way did the bicycle go?: and other intriguing mathematical mysteries, Dolciani mathematical expositions, vol. 18, Cambridge University Press, ISBN 978-0-88385-300-9
