= Thomas Kurtz =

Thomas Kurtz may refer to:

- Thomas E. Kurtz (1928–2024), professor of mathematics and computer scientist
- Thomas G. Kurtz (1941–2025), professor of mathematics and statistics
- Tom Kurtz, rhythm guitarist for the band Starstruck that recorded the hit song Black Betty#Ram Jam version
