= James Lewin McGregor =

Canadian mathematician

- Born: May 31, 1921; Crawford Bay, British Columbia, Canada
- Died: January 3, 1988 (aged 66); Mountain View, California, U.S.
- Education: University of British Columbia (BA); California Institute of Technology (PhD)
- Known for: Karlin–McGregor polynomials
- Scientific career
- Fields: Mathematics
- Workplaces: Stanford University
- Doctoral students: Thomas G. Kurtz

James Lewin McGregor (May 31, 1921, Crawford Bay, British Columbia – January 3, 1988, Mountain View, California) was a mathematician who introduced Karlin–McGregor polynomials.

A native of Canada, he served in the Canadian military during World War II. He received his undergrad degree from the University of British Columbia. He received his PhD from Caltech and then became a professor of mathematics at Stanford University.
