= Sami A. Sanjad =

Lebanese-American pediatrician

Sami A. Sanjad (Arabic: سامي سنجد) is a Lebanese-American pediatrician. He described a disorder called Sanjad–Sakati syndrome that was named after his and fellow pediatrician Nadia Awni Sakati's names.

He received his MD in 1965 from the American University of Beirut, where he currently works. He has also worked in the King Faisal Specialist Hospital in Riyadh, Saudi Arabia.
