= Bateman Manuscript Project =

The Bateman Manuscript Project was a major effort at collation and encyclopedic compilation of the mathematical theory of special functions. It resulted in the eventual publication of five important reference volumes, under the editorship of Arthur Erdélyi.

== Overview ==
The theory of special functions was a core activity of the field of applied mathematics, from the middle of the nineteenth century to the advent of high-speed electronic computing. The intricate properties of spherical harmonics, elliptic functions and other staples of problem-solving in mathematical physics, astronomy and right across the physical sciences, are not easy to document completely, absent a theory explaining the inter-relationships. Mathematical tables to perform actual calculations needed to mesh with an adequate theory of how functions could be transformed into those already tabulated.

Harry Bateman, a distinguished applied mathematician, undertook the somewhat quixotic task of trying to collate the content of the very large literature. On his death in 1946, his papers on this project were still in a uniformly rough state. The publication of the edited version provided special functions texts more up-to-date than, for example, the classic Whittaker & Watson.

The volumes were out of print for many years, and copyright in the works reverted to the California Institute of Technology, who renewed them in the early 1980s. In 2011, the California Institute of Technology gave permission for scans of the volumes to be made publicly available.

Other mathematicians involved in the project include Wilhelm Magnus, Fritz Oberhettinger and Francesco Tricomi.

== Askey–Bateman project ==
In 2007, the Askey–Bateman project was announced by Mourad Ismail as a five- or six-volume encyclopedic book series on special functions, based on the works of Harry Bateman and Richard Askey.

Starting in 2020, Cambridge University Press began publishing volumes 1 and 2 of this Encyclopedia of Special Functions with series editors Mourad Ismail and Walter Van Assche:

- Volume 1: Univariate Orthogonal Polynomials (editor: Mourad Ismail)
- Volume 2: Multivariable Special Functions (editors: Tom H. Koornwinder, Jasper V. Stokman)
- Volume 3: Hypergeometric and Basic Hypergeometric Functions (editor: Mourad Ismail)

Further volumes were considered to include topics such as:

- Continued fractions, number theory, and elliptic and theta functions
- Equations of mathematical physics, including continuous and discrete Painlevé, Lamé and Heun equations
- Transforms and related topics

== See also ==
- Abramowitz and Stegun (AS)
- Jahnke and Emde (JE)
- Magnus and Oberhettinger (MO)
- NIST Handbook of Mathematical Functions
- Digital Library of Mathematical Functions (DLMF)

== Bibliography ==
- Erdélyi, Arthur; Magnus, (Hans Heinrich) Wilhelm; Oberhettinger, Fritz [in German]; Tricomi, Francesco Giacomo; Bertin, David; Fulks, Watson B.; Harvey, Albert Raymond; Thomsen, Jr., Donald L.; Weber, Maria A.; Whitney, Eoin Laird [at Wikidata]; Stampfel, Rosemarie (1953). Erdélyi, Arthur (ed.). Higher Transcendental Functions - Volume I - Based, in part, on notes left by Harry Bateman (PDF). Bateman Manuscript Project. Vol. I (1 ed.). New York / Toronto / London: McGraw-Hill Book Company, Inc. LCCN 53-5555. Contract No. N6onr-244 Task Order XIV. Project Designation Number: NR 043-045. Order No. 19545. Archived (PDF) from the original on 2017-04-09. (xxvi+4 errata pages+302 pages, red cloth hardcover) (NB. With a preface by Mina Rees and a foreword by Earnest C. Watson. Copyright was renewed by California Institute of Technology in 1981.); Reprint: Robert E. Krieger Publishing Co., Inc., Melbourne, Florida, US. 1981. ISBN 0-89874-069-X; Planned Dover reprint ISBN 0-486-44614-X.
- Erdélyi, Arthur; Magnus, (Hans Heinrich) Wilhelm; Oberhettinger, Fritz [in German]; Tricomi, Francesco Giacomo; Bertin, David; Fulks, Watson B.; Harvey, Albert Raymond; Thomsen, Jr., Donald L.; Weber, Maria A.; Whitney, Eoin Laird [at Wikidata]; Stampfel, Rosemarie (1953). Erdélyi, Arthur (ed.). Higher Transcendental Functions - Volume II - Based, in part, on notes left by Harry Bateman (PDF). Bateman Manuscript Project. Vol. II (1 ed.). New York / Toronto / London: McGraw-Hill Book Company, Inc. LCCN 53-5555. Contract No. N6onr-244 Task Order XIV. Project Designation Number: NR 043-045. Order No. 19546. Archived (PDF) from the original on 2017-04-09. (xvii+1 errata page+396 pages, red cloth hardcover) (NB. Copyright was renewed by California Institute of Technology in 1981.); Reprint: Robert E. Krieger Publishing Co., Inc., Melbourne, Florida, US. 1981. ISBN 0-89874-069-X; Planned Dover reprint: ISBN 0-486-44615-8.
- Erdélyi, Arthur; Magnus, (Hans Heinrich) Wilhelm; Oberhettinger, Fritz [in German]; Tricomi, Francesco Giacomo; Bertin, David; Fulks, Watson B.; Harvey, Albert Raymond; Thomsen, Jr., Donald L.; Weber, Maria A.; Whitney, Eoin Laird [at Wikidata]; Stampfel, Rosemarie (1955). Erdélyi, Arthur (ed.). Higher Transcendental Functions - Volume III - Based, in part, on notes left by Harry Bateman (PDF). Bateman Manuscript Project. Vol. III (1 ed.). New York / Toronto / London: McGraw-Hill Book Company, Inc. LCCN 53-5555. Contract No. N6onr-244 Task Order XIV. Project Designation Number: NR 043-045. Order No. 19547. Archived (PDF) from the original on 2017-04-09. (xvii+292+2 pages, red cloth hardcover) (NB. Copyright was renewed by California Institute of Technology in 1983.); Reprint: Robert E. Krieger Publishing Co., Inc., Melbourne, Florida, US. 1981. ISBN 0-89874-069-X; Planned Dover reprint ISBN 0-486-44616-6.
- Erdélyi, Arthur; Magnus, (Hans Heinrich) Wilhelm; Oberhettinger, Fritz [in German]; Tricomi, Francesco Giacomo; Bertin, David; Fulks, Watson B.; Harvey, Albert Raymond; Thomsen, Jr., Donald L.; Weber, Maria A.; Whitney, Eoin Laird [at Wikidata]; Stampfel, Rosemarie (1954). Erdélyi, Arthur (ed.). Tables of Integral Transforms - Volume I - Based, in part, on notes left by Harry Bateman (PDF). Bateman Manuscript Project. Vol. I (1 ed.). New York / Toronto / London: McGraw-Hill Book Company, Inc. LCCN 54-6214. SBN 07-019549-8. Contract No. N6onr-244 Task Order XIV. Project Designation Number: NR 043-045. Order No. 19549. Archived (PDF) from the original on 2020-07-04. (xx+391 pages including 1 errata page, red cloth hardcover)
- Erdélyi, Arthur; Magnus, (Hans Heinrich) Wilhelm; Oberhettinger, Fritz [in German]; Tricomi, Francesco Giacomo; Bertin, David; Fulks, Watson B.; Harvey, Albert Raymond; Thomsen, Jr., Donald L.; Weber, Maria A.; Whitney, Eoin Laird [at Wikidata]; Stampfel, Rosemarie (1954). Erdélyi, Arthur (ed.). Tables of Integral Transforms - Volume II - Based, in part, on notes left by Harry Bateman (PDF). Bateman Manuscript Project. Vol. II (1 ed.). New York / Toronto / London: McGraw-Hill Book Company, Inc. LCCN 54-6214. Contract No. N6onr-244 Task Order XIV. Project Designation Number: NR 043-045. Order No. 19550. Archived (PDF) from the original on 2020-07-04. (xvi+451 pages, red cloth hardcover)
- "Part IV. The Activities Of The Divisions / The Division Of Physics, Mathematics, And Astronomy / Mathematics". Annual Report 1949–1950 To The Board Of Trustees - Comprising the Reports of the President, the Comptroller, and Other Administrative Officers (PDF). Pasadena, California, US: California Institute of Technology. November 1950. pp. 46, 101. Archived (PDF) from the original on 2020-07-23. (1+6+111+1+1 pages)
- Bejtmen, G.; Erdeji, Arthur (1969). Tablicy intelgral'nych preobrazovanij - I. Preobrazovanija Fur'e, Laplasa, mellina [Tables of integral transforms - Volume I.] (in Russian). Moscow: Nauka. (343 pages, cloth hardcover)
- Bejtmen, G.; Erdeji, Arthur (1969). Tablicy intelgral'nych preobrazovanij - II. Preobrazovanija Vesselja. Integraly otspecial'nych funkcij [Tables of integral transforms - Volume II.] (in Russian). Moscow: Nauka. (327 pages, cloth hardcover)
