= Boas–Buck polynomials =

In mathematics, Boas–Buck polynomials are sequences of polynomials $\Phi_n^{(r)}(z)$ defined from analytic functions $B$ and $C$ by generating functions of the form

$$\displaystyle C(zt^r B(t))=\sum_{n\ge0}\Phi_n^{(r)}(z)t^n$$.

The case $r=1$, sometimes called generalized Appell polynomials, was studied by Boas and Buck (1958).
