= William Charles Brenke =

American mathematician

William Charles Brenke (April 12, 1874, Berlin – 1964) was an American mathematician who introduced Brenke polynomials and wrote several undergraduate textbooks.

He received his PhD in mathematics at Harvard under Maxime Bôcher. Brenke taught at the University of Nebraska mathematics department from 1908 to 1944 and was chair of the department from 1934 to 1944. He retired in 1943 but his successor, Ralph Hull, was put on official leave to do war work and returned from leave in 1945.

== Publications ==
- Brenke, W. C. (1930). "On polynomial solutions of a class of differential equations of the second order". Bull. Amer. Math. Soc. 36 (2): 77–84. doi:10.1090/s0002-9904-1930-04888-0. MR 1561893.
- Brenke, W. C. (1933). "On the summability and general sum of a series of Legendre polynomials". Bull. Amer. Math. Soc. 39 (10): 821–824. doi:10.1090/s0002-9904-1933-05753-1. MR 1562735.
