= Generalized Appell polynomials =

In mathematics, a polynomial sequence $\{p_n(z) \}$ has a generalized Appell representation if the generating function for the polynomials takes on a certain form:

$$K(z,w) = A(w)\Psi(zg(w)) = \sum_{n=0}^\infty p_n(z) w^n$$

where the generating function or kernel $K(z,w)$ is composed of the series

$A(w)= \sum_{n=0}^\infty a_n w^n \quad$ with $a_0 \ne 0$

and

$\Psi(t)= \sum_{n=0}^\infty \Psi_n t^n \quad$ and all $\Psi_n \ne 0$

and

$g(w)= \sum_{n=1}^\infty g_n w^n \quad$ with $g_1 \ne 0.$

Given the above, it is not hard to show that $p_n(z)$ is a polynomial of degree $n$.

Boas–Buck polynomials are a slightly more general class of polynomials.

== Special cases ==
- The choice of $g(w)=w$ gives the class of Brenke polynomials.
- The choice of $\Psi(t)=e^t$ results in the Sheffer sequence of polynomials, which include the general difference polynomials, such as the Newton polynomials.
- The combined choice of $g(w)=w$ and $\Psi(t)=e^t$ gives the Appell sequence of polynomials.

== Explicit representation ==
The generalized Appell polynomials have the explicit representation

$$p_n(z) = \sum_{k=0}^n z^k \Psi_k h_k.$$

The constant is

$$h_k=\sum_{P} a_{j_0} g_{j_1} g_{j_2} \cdots g_{j_k}$$

where this sum extends over all compositions of $n$ into $k+1$ parts; that is, the sum extends over all $\{j\}$ such that

$$j_0+j_1+ \cdots +j_k = n.\,$$

For the Appell polynomials, this becomes the formula

$$p_n(z) = \sum_{k=0}^n \frac {a_{n-k} z^k} {k!}.$$

== Recursion relation ==
Equivalently, a necessary and sufficient condition that the kernel $K(z,w)$ can be written as $A(w)\Psi(zg(w))$ with $g_1=1$ is that

$$\frac{\partial K(z,w)}{\partial w} =
c(w) K(z,w)+\frac{zb(w)}{w} \frac{\partial K(z,w)}{\partial z}$$

where $b(w)$ and $c(w)$ have the power series

$$b(w) = \frac{w}{g(w)} \frac {d}{dw} g(w)
= 1 + \sum_{n=1}^\infty b_n w^n$$

and

$$c(w) = \frac{1}{A(w)} \frac {d}{dw} A(w)
= \sum_{n=0}^\infty c_n w^n.$$

Substituting

$$K(z,w)= \sum_{n=0}^\infty p_n(z) w^n$$

immediately gives the recursion relation

$$z^{n+1} \frac {d}{dz} \left[ \frac{p_n(z)}{z^n} \right]=
-\sum_{k=0}^{n-1} c_{n-k-1} p_k(z)
-z \sum_{k=1}^{n-1} b_{n-k} \frac{d}{dz} p_k(z).$$

For the special case of the Brenke polynomials, one has $g(w)=w$ and thus all of the $b_n=0$, simplifying the recursion relation significantly.

== See also ==
- q-difference polynomials
