= Arthur Erdélyi =

Hungarian-born British mathematician

- Born: 2 October 1908; Budapest
- Died: 12 December 1977 (aged 69); Edinburgh
- Citizenship: British
- Known for: special functions, asymptotic analysis, fractional integration, partial differential equations
- Scientific career
- Fields: Mathematics
- Workplaces: University of Edinburgh, Caltech

Arthur Erdélyi FRS, FRSE (2 October 1908 – 12 December 1977) was a Hungarian-born British mathematician. Erdélyi was a leading expert on special functions, particularly orthogonal polynomials and hypergeometric functions.

== Biography ==
He was born Arthur Diamant in Budapest, Hungary to Ignác Josef Armin Diamant and Frederike Roth. His name was changed to Erdélyi when his mother remarried to Paul Erdélyi. He attended the primary and secondary schools there from 1914 to 1926. His interest in mathematics dates back to this time. Erdélyi was a Jew, and so it was difficult for him to receive a university education in his native Hungary. He travelled to Brno, Czechoslovakia, to obtain a degree in electrical engineering. However, after his flair for mathematics was discovered (he won several prizes in a competition in his first year), he was persuaded to study the subject.

He soon after began to conduct theoretical research into mathematics, and his first paper was published in 1930. At the end of 1936, he had already published 18 papers, and 11 more appeared in 1937. However, due to the German occupation of Czechoslovakia and neighbouring countries, Erdélyi was forced to flee the country.

Erdélyi contacted Edmund Whittaker, a fellow expert in hypergeometric functions, asking for his assistance and soon after, Erdélyi travelled to Edinburgh, Scotland, after receiving £400 for a visa from Whittaker. He joined the University of Edinburgh, and after 2 years there, became a lecturer in the Department of Mathematics (after gaining a DSc in 1940 based on his already extensive published work).

In 1946, after Harry Bateman died, Whittaker was asked to recommend a mathematician who could start the task of publishing Bateman's manuscripts: the Bateman Manuscript Project. Erdélyi was chosen, and in 1947, after becoming a naturalised British citizen, travelled to Caltech, California as a Visiting Professor. He returned to Edinburgh in 1948, only to resign in 1949 to assume the position of Professor of Mathematics at the California Institute of Technology. This was a post he was to hold for the next 15 years, and he retained his citizenship of Britain while in the United States.

In 1964, he returned to Edinburgh as a Professor of Mathematics, a position he held until his death in 1977.

He died in Edinburgh.

== Family ==
He married Eva Neuburg in 1942. They did not have children.

== Research ==
Erdélyi was primarily an expert in special functions, in particular, Lamé functions, hypergeometric functions and orthogonal polynomials. He also contributed to the field of asymptotic analysis, fractional integration and partial differential equations. He introduced the Erdélyi–Kober operators for fractional integration. He wrote two books of high standing - Asymptotic Expansions (1955) (reprinted by Dover) and Operational Calculus and Generalised Functions (1962)

== Works ==
- Erdélyi, Arthur; Magnus, (Hans Heinrich) Wilhelm; Oberhettinger, Fritz [in German]; Tricomi, Francesco Giacomo; Bertin, David; Fulks, Watson B.; Harvey, A. R.; Thomsen, Jr., Donald L.; Weber, Maria A.; Whitney, E. L.; Stampfel, Rosemarie (1953). Erdélyi, Arthur (ed.). Higher Transcendental Functions - Volume I - Based, in part, on notes left by Harry Bateman (PDF). Bateman Manuscript Project. Vol. I (1 ed.). New York / Toronto / London: McGraw-Hill Book Company, Inc. LCCN 53-5555. Contract No. N6onr-244 Task Order XIV. Project Designation Number: NR 043-045. Order No. 19545. Archived (PDF) from the original on 2017-04-09. (xxvi+4 errata pages+302 pages) (NB. With a preface by Mina Rees and a foreword by Earnest C. Watson. Copyright was renewed by California Institute of Technology in 1981.); Reprint: Robert E. Krieger Publishing Co., Inc., Melbourne, Florida, USA. 1981. ISBN 0-89874-069-X; Planned Dover reprint ISBN 0-486-44614-X.
- Erdélyi, Arthur; Magnus, (Hans Heinrich) Wilhelm; Oberhettinger, Fritz [in German]; Tricomi, Francesco Giacomo; Bertin, David; Fulks, Watson B.; Harvey, A. R.; Thomsen, Jr., Donald L.; Weber, Maria A.; Whitney, E. L.; Stampfel, Rosemarie (1953). Erdélyi, Arthur (ed.). Higher Transcendental Functions - Volume II - Based, in part, on notes left by Harry Bateman (PDF). Bateman Manuscript Project. Vol. II (1 ed.). New York / Toronto / London: McGraw-Hill Book Company, Inc. LCCN 53-5555. Contract No. N6onr-244 Task Order XIV. Project Designation Number: NR 043-045. Order No. 19546. Archived (PDF) from the original on 2017-04-09. (xvii+1 errata page+396 pages) (NB. Copyright was renewed by California Institute of Technology in 1981.); Reprint: Robert E. Krieger Publishing Co., Inc., Melbourne, Florida, USA. 1981. ISBN 0-89874-069-X; Planned Dover reprint: ISBN 0-486-44615-8.
- Erdélyi, Arthur; Magnus, (Hans Heinrich) Wilhelm; Oberhettinger, Fritz [in German]; Tricomi, Francesco Giacomo; Bertin, David; Fulks, Watson B.; Harvey, A. R.; Thomsen, Jr., Donald L.; Weber, Maria A.; Whitney, E. L.; Stampfel, Rosemarie (1955). Erdélyi, Arthur (ed.). Higher Transcendental Functions - Volume III - Based, in part, on notes left by Harry Bateman (PDF). Bateman Manuscript Project. Vol. III (1 ed.). New York / Toronto / London: McGraw-Hill Book Company, Inc. LCCN 53-5555. Contract No. N6onr-244 Task Order XIV. Project Designation Number: NR 043-045. Order No. 19547. Archived (PDF) from the original on 2017-04-09. (xvii+292+2 pages) (NB. Copyright was renewed by California Institute of Technology in 1983.); Reprint: Robert E. Krieger Publishing Co., Inc., Melbourne, Florida, USA. 1981. ISBN 0-89874-069-X; Planned Dover reprint ISBN 0-486-44616-6.
- Erdélyi, Arthur; Magnus, (Hans Heinrich) Wilhelm; Oberhettinger, Fritz [in German]; Tricomi, Francesco Giacomo; Bertin, David; Fulks, Watson B.; Harvey, A. R.; Thomsen, Jr., Donald L.; Weber, Maria A.; Whitney, E. L.; Stampfel, Rosemarie (1954). Erdélyi, Arthur (ed.). Tables of Integral Transforms - Volume I - Based, in part, on notes left by Harry Bateman (PDF). Bateman Manuscript Project. Vol. I (1 ed.). New York / Toronto / London: McGraw-Hill Book Company, Inc. LCCN 54-6214. SBN 07-019549-8. Contract No. N6onr-244 Task Order XIV. Project Designation Number: NR 043-045. Order No. 19549. Archived (PDF) from the original on 2020-07-04. (xx+391 pages including 1 errata page, red cloth hardcover)
- Erdélyi, Arthur; Magnus, (Hans Heinrich) Wilhelm; Oberhettinger, Fritz [in German]; Tricomi, Francesco Giacomo; Bertin, David; Fulks, Watson B.; Harvey, A. R.; Thomsen, Jr., Donald L.; Weber, Maria A.; Whitney, E. L.; Stampfel, Rosemarie (1954). Erdélyi, Arthur (ed.). Tables of Integral Transforms - Volume II - Based, in part, on notes left by Harry Bateman (PDF). Bateman Manuscript Project. Vol. II (1 ed.). New York / Toronto / London: McGraw-Hill Book Company, Inc. LCCN 54-6214. Contract No. N6onr-244 Task Order XIV. Project Designation Number: NR 043-045. Order No. 19550. Archived (PDF) from the original on 2020-07-04. (xvi+451 pages, red cloth hardcover)
- Erdélyi, Arthur (1956). Asymptotic expansions. New York, USA: Dover Publications, Inc. (vi+108 pages)
- Erdélyi, Arthur (1959). Lectures on Mikusiński's theory of operational calculus and generalized functions. Pasadena, California, USA: California Institute of Technology. (iii+137 pages)
- Erdélyi, Arthur (1962). Operational calculus and generalized functions. New York, USA: Holt, Rinehart and Winston. (viii+103 pages)

== Awards ==
Erdélyi received several honours, including being elected to the Royal Society as a Fellow in 1975. He also became a fellow of the Royal Society of Edinburgh in 1945, and was also elected a member of the Academy of Sciences of Turin.
