= Tim Kraska =

German computer scientist

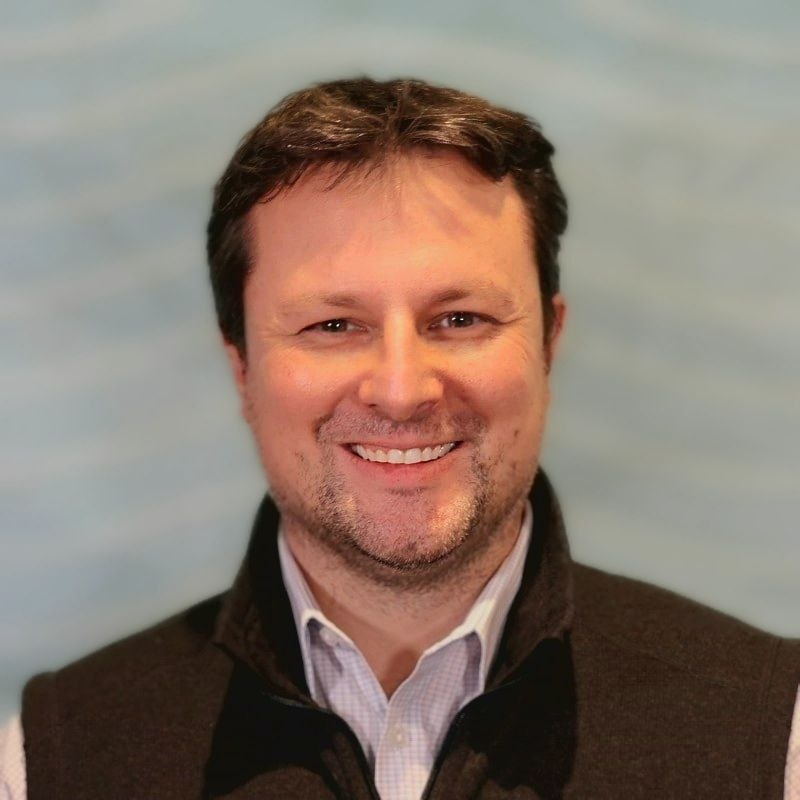
- Tim Kraska, Professor at MIT
- Born: Dortmund, Germany
- Education: ETH Zurich (PhD); University of Münster (MSc)(BS); University of Sydney (MSc)
- Known for: Learned indexes
- Awards: VLDB early career (2018); NSF Career Award (2015); Intel Outstanding Researcher Award (2021)
- Scientific career
- Fields: Computer Science
- Workplaces: Massachusetts Institute of Technology; Brown University; Google
- Website: people.csail.mit.edu/kraska/

Tim Kraska is a German computer scientist specializing in data systems and the intersection of systems and machine learning. He is currently an associate professor of computer science at the Massachusetts Institute of Technology.

== Education ==
Kraska received his PhD from the Swiss Federal Institute of Technology in Zürich in 2010, his Master's of Science degrees from University of Münster in Germany and University of Sydney in 2006, and a Bachelor of Science in Information Systems also from University of Münster in 2004.

== Career ==
Kraska was at the University of California-Berkeley's AMPLab as a post-doctoral scholar from 2010 to 2012. Kraska joined Brown University's computer science department as an assistant professor in January 2013. During this time, his focus was on big data management and hybrid human/machine data base systems. He was later promoted to adjunct professor in January 2018.

Kraska co-founded Einblick Analytics, a startup based on the Northstar research project, which builds a collaborative data platform to enable teams to work together.Einblick Analytics was acquired by Databricks in 2024.

Kraska has been involved in the development of numerous data systems, such as building a database on S3, which proposed for a first time the separation of compute and storage for cloud database systems as now used by Snowflake and many other systems; Tupleware, a compilation framework for data analytic workflows; CrowdDB, a database system that automatically uses crowd-sourcing for data cleaning tasks; and Northstar, an interactive data science system. Kraska co-founded Einblick Analytics in 2010, a startup based on Northstar, which builds a collaborative data platform to enable teams to work together.

Kraska developed the concept of Learned Indexes, which he developed while at Google. It is now used as a part of Google BigTable, has been integrated into RocksDB, and has been used in other applications such as DNA sequence alignment and internet packet classification.

Kraska has also developed the first Instance Optimized Database Systems.

Kraska has published more than 150 scholarly articles, has been cited more than 8,500 times and has an h-index of 43.

== Awards ==
Kraska received the Siemens Prize and the Master of Information Technology Scholarship for outstanding achievement from the University of Sydney, both in 2005. Kraska received a German Academic Exchange Service scholarship in 2006. Kraska received a Swiss National Science Foundation Prospective Researcher Fellowship in 2010. Kraska received the VLDB best demo award in 2011 and the VLDB Early Career Award in 2018.

Kraska received the NSF Career Award in 2015, the Google Faculty Research Award in 2015 for his proposal “Human-In-the-Loop Data Exploration”, the VMware Systems Research Award in 2017, and the Intel Outstanding Researcher Award in 2021.

Kraska was the PC Track Chair for the 2016 SIGMOD conference, and he was the Program Vice Chair for the 2019 conference. Kraska was awarded the Sloan Research Fellowship for computer science in 2017.

Kraska is on the advisory board of the Northeast Big Data Innovation Hub.

== Scientific Publications ==
- Amber Feng, Michael Franklin, Donald Kossmann, Tim Kraska, Samuel Madden, Sukriti Ramesh, Reynold Xin, “CrowdDB: Sourcing the VLDB Crowd” (Demo Paper), Proceedings of the VLDB Endowment (PVLDB), 4(12), pp. 1387–1390, 2011.
- Jiannan Wang, Tim Kraska, Michael J. Franklin, Jianhua Feng, “CrowdER: Crowdsourcing Entity Resolution,” Proceedings of the VLDB Endowment (PVLDB), 5(11), pp. 1483–1494, 2012.
- Matthias Brantner, David Graf, Daniela Florescu, Donald Kossmann, Tim Kraska, “Building a Database on S3,” Proceedings of the ACM SIGMOD International Conference on Management of Data (SIGMOD), pp. 251–264, 2008.
- Tim Kraska, Ameet Talwalkar, John Duchi, Rean Griffith, Michael Franklin, Michael Jordan, “MLbase: A Distributed Machine-learning System,” Proceedings of the Conference on Innovative Data Systems Research (CIDR), 2013.
- Tim Kraska, Alex Beutel, Ed H. Chi, Jeffrey Dean, Neoklis Polyzotis, “The Case for Learned Index Structures,” Proceedings of the ACM SIGMOD International Conference on Management of Data (SIGMOD), pp. 489–504, 2018.
- Donald Kossmann, Tim Kraska, Simon Loesing, “An Evaluation of Alternative Architectures for Transaction Processing in the Cloud,” Proceedings of the ACM SIGMOD International Conference on Management of Data (SIGMOD), pp. 579–590, 2010.
- Tim Kraska, Martin Hentschel, Gustavo Alonso, Donald Kossmann, “Consistency Rationing in the Cloud: Pay only when it matters,” Proceedings of the VLDB Endowment (PVLDB), 2(1), pp. 253–264, 2009.
- Tim Kraska, Gene Pang, Michael Franklin, Samuel Madden, Alan Fekete, “MDCC: Multi-Data Center Consistency,” Proceedings of the Eurosys Conference, pp. 113–126, 2013.
- Carsten Binnig, Donald Kossmann, Tim Kraska, Simon Loesing, “How is the Weather tomorrow? Towards a Benchmark for the Cloud,” DBTest Workshop in conjunction with SIGMOD 2009, Providence, RI, 2009.
- Jiannan Wang, Guoliang Li, Tim Kraska, Michael J. Franklin, Jianhua Feng, “Leveraging Transitive Relations for Crowdsourced Joins,” Proceedings of the ACM SIGMOD International Conference on Management of Data (SIGMOD), pp. 229–240, 2013.

== Patents ==
- “Fine-grained and concurrent access to a virtualized disk in a distributed system,” US application no. 12/350,197, July 2009.
- “Visual data computing platform using a progressive computation engine,” provisional application, July 2021. Zeyuan Shang, Emanuel Zgraggen, Benedetto Buratti, Philipp Eichmann, Navid Karimeddiny, Charlie Meyer, Wesley Runnels, Tim Kraska.
