= TBCE =

Protein-coding gene in the species Homo sapiens

Available structures
PDB	Ortholog search: PDBe RCSB
PDB	List of PDB id codes 4ICU, 4ICV

Identifiers
- Aliases: TBCE, HRD, KCS, KCS1, pac2, tubulin folding cofactor E, PEAMO
- External IDs: OMIM: 604934; MGI: 1917680; HomoloGene: 37744; GeneCards: TBCE; OMA:TBCE - orthologs

Gene location (Mouse)
Chr.	Chromosome 13 (mouse)
Band	13 A1|13 5.29 cM	Start	14,172,534 bp
Band	13 A1|13 5.29 cM	End	14,214,223 bp
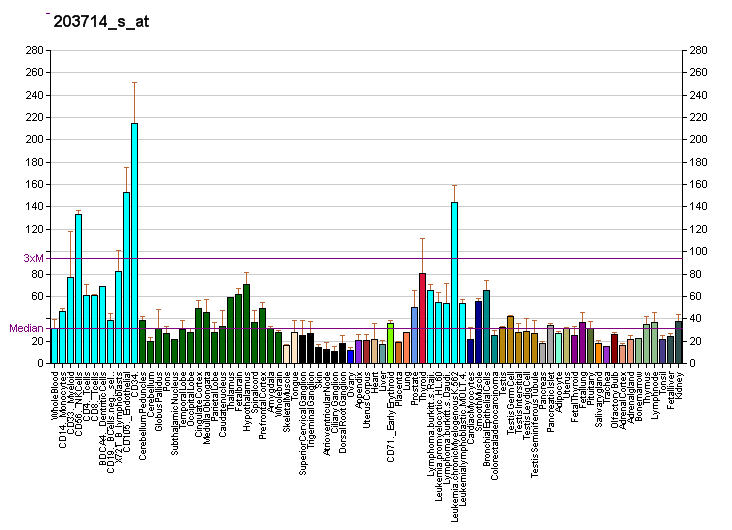

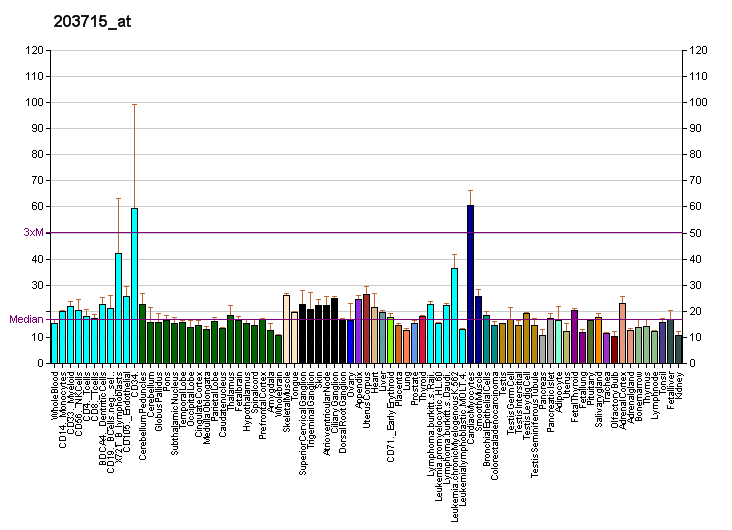
RNA expression pattern
Bgee	Human / Mouse (ortholog); n/a / Top expressed in: neural layer of retina; genital tubercle; granulocyte; superior frontal gyrus; tail of embryo; primary visual cortex; cerebellar cortex; spermatid; neural tube; ganglionic eminence
BioGPS	More reference expression data
Gene ontology
Molecular function	chaperone binding; protein binding; alpha-tubulin binding
Cellular component	cytoplasm; microtubule; cytoskeleton
Biological process	post-chaperonin tubulin folding pathway; protein folding; mitotic spindle organization; microtubule cytoskeleton organization; tubulin complex assembly
Sources:Amigo / QuickGO
Orthologs
Species	Human	Mouse
Entrez	6905	70430
Ensembl	ENSG00000116957	ENSMUSG00000039233
UniProt	Q15813	Q8CIV8
RefSeq (mRNA)	NM_003193; NM_001079515; NM_001287801; NM_001287802	NM_178337
RefSeq (protein)	NP_001072983; NP_001274730; NP_001274731; NP_003184	NP_848027
Location (UCSC)	n/a	Chr 13: 14.17 – 14.21 Mb
PubMed search
- Wikidata
View/Edit Human	View/Edit Mouse

Tubulin-specific chaperone E is a protein that in humans is encoded by the TBCE gene.

Cofactor E is one of four proteins (cofactors A, D, E, and C) involved in the pathway leading to correctly folded beta-tubulin from folding intermediates. Cofactors A and D are believed to play a role in capturing and stabilizing beta-tubulin intermediates in a quasi-native confirmation. Cofactor E binds to the cofactor D/beta-tubulin complex; interaction with cofactor C then causes the release of beta-tubulin polypeptides that are committed to the native state. Two transcript variants encoding the same protein have been found for this gene.

The TBCE gene is either deleted or mutated in Sanjad-Sakati Syndrome
