= Nadia Awni Sakati =

Syrian-Saudi pediatrician (born 1938)

Nadia Awni Sakati (Arabic: نادية عوني سقطي) is a Syrian-Saudi pediatrician. Born on 23 May 1938 in Damascus, Syria, Sakati has contributed to genetics medicine.

Sakati aspired to become a doctor since 8th grade at school. Her father supported her pursuing medical studies in the US, but he died six months before she graduated from medical school in Damascus in 1965. She was accepted to study in the US after that, but enrolled at the American University of Beirut to remain near her mother.

Sakati spent her residency in Pediatrics at the American University of Beirut and Jackson Memorial Hospital in Miami, Florida. She earned her MD from Damascus University in 1965. She worked in the hospital of American University in Beirut, Lebanon and Jackson Memorial Hospital in Miami, Florida, US. In 1969, she was the Fellow in Genetics and Metabolism at the University of California, San Diego. She co-authored books with William Nyhan in "Genetic and Malformation Syndrome in Clinical Medicine, 1976" and Diagnostic Recognition of Genetic Disease, 1987".

Sakati was appointed as a pediatrician and senior consultant for the genetics research center in King Faisal Specialist Hospital in Riyadh, Saudi Arabia. She established the first genetics departments in Saudi Arabia, where she worked on chorionic villus sampling and carrier detection. She described three rare disorders in children, Sakati–Nyhan–Tisdale syndrome with William Leo Nyhan and W.K. Tisdale, Sanjad-Sakati syndrome with Sami A. Sanjad, and Woodhouse-Sakati syndrome, with N. J. Woodhouse.
