= Q-Konhauser polynomials =

In mathematics, the q-Konhauser polynomials are a q-analog of the Konhauser polynomials.
