= Al Ajeery calendar =

Al Ajeery Calendar or Ojairi Calendar, is a calendar prepared by the Kuwaiti scholar Saleh Al Ajeery, after whom it is named. The calendar began in 1952 and is still produced every year. Al Ajeery's first attempt to create a calendar began around 1934, but it was not a calendar in the conventional sense. It was merely handwritten tables showing the days of the week of the Arabic month. It was based on conventional calculations, considering lunar months to occur every 29-30 days. Then, he introduced the intercalation system, and then transferred the signs of the sun and the lunar phases and then the times from ancient calendars. Naturally, the information contained in it developed during that period and became more accurate. It was also issued in several types: wall calendars, table memos, office agendas, pocket diaries, and pocket calendars.

Since 1951, Al Ajeery has printed the calendar in several countries, such as Kuwait, Syria (in Aleppo and Damascus), Egypt (in Cairo), Japan, Nablus (in Palestine), Lebanon (in Beirut), Iraq (in Baghdad), Pakistan, and Singapore. Kuwait has adopted the Al Ajeery calendar in its official transactions. Pursuant to a Cabinet decision in 2006, the Al Ajeery calendar became the official calendar of the country, with regard to calculating times, crescents, and astronomical phenomena.
