= Hideaki Kurokawa =

Japanese ice hockey player

Personal information
- Nationality: Japanese
- Born: 8 May 1944 (age 81) Hokkaido, Japan

Sport
- Sport: Ice hockey

Hideaki Kurokawa (黒川 秀明, Kurokawa Hideaki; born 8 May 1944) is a Japanese former ice hockey player. He competed in the men's tournament at the 1972 Winter Olympics.
