= Dan Jiao =

Dan Jiao is a microwave engineer, the Synopsys Professor in the Elmore Family School of Electrical and Computer Engineering at Purdue University. She was named Fellow of the Institute of Electrical and Electronics Engineers (IEEE) in 2016, "for contributions to computational electromagnetics".
