= University of Louisiana =

University of Louisiana may refer to:

- University of Louisiana System, public multi-campus university system
  - University of Louisiana at Lafayette, whose sports teams are known as the Louisiana Ragin' Cajuns
  - University of Louisiana at Monroe
- Tulane University of Louisiana, in New Orleans, which was named "The University of Louisiana" 1847–1884
- Xavier University of Louisiana, in New Orleans

== Fictional ==
- University of Louisiana, a fictional university in Everybody's All-American (film) (1988)
- University of Louisiana, a fictional university in The Waterboy

== See also ==
- Louisiana State University, the flagship university of Louisiana
- List of colleges and universities in Louisiana
