= Hideaki Miyamura =

- Born: 1955 (age 70–71); Niigata, Japan
- Occupation: Potter
- Known for: Miyamura's studio pottery

Hideaki Miyamura (born 1955) is a Japanese-born American potter working in New Hampshire. Miyamura is best known for his unique iridescent glazes, including a compelling gold glaze, the "starry night" glaze on a black background, and a blue hare's fur glaze.

Miyamura was born in Niigata, Japan, as the son of an architect and civil engineer. Miyamura wanted to be a medical doctor but believed the schooling was too expensive. Instead, he traveled to the United States and studied at Western Michigan University. Studying art history at Western Michigan, Miyamura became interested in art. After college, Miyamura decided to take up pottery in Japan.

Miyamura spent over five years working with master potter Shurei Miura of Yamanashi, Japan. During that time, he experimented with over ten thousand test pieces, using countless formulas to develop original glazes. Through this process, he developed glazes that he describes as "yohen tenmoku," after a Chinese pottery tradition. More recently, he has conducted over two thousand additional test cases.

Many of his glazes are inspired by the tenmoku style of 12th and 13th Century Chinese glazes used on tea bowls in monasteries on Mount Tianmu in the Zhejiang province in China. Some have argued that his work is also influenced by Scandinavian pottery.

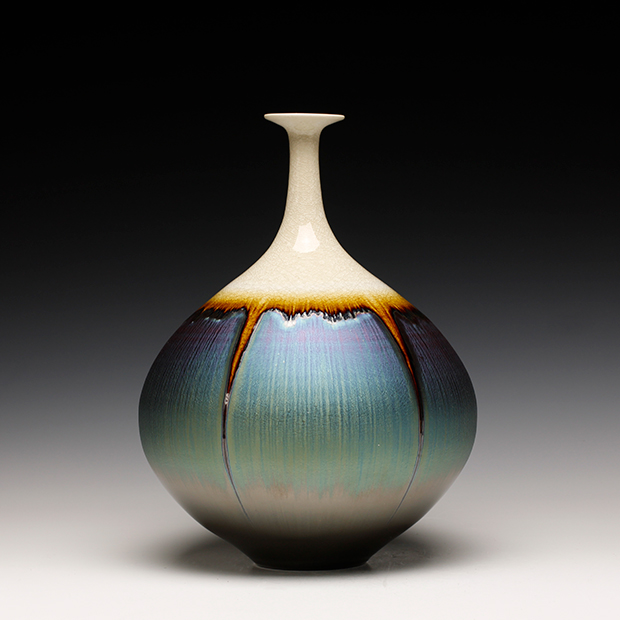

Miyamura's studio pottery appears in the permanent collections of more than a dozen museums, predominantly in the United States, including the Art Institute of Chicago, the Arthur M. Sackler Gallery, the Peabody Essex Museum, the Minneapolis Institute of Arts, the Newark Museum of Art, and the Renwick Gallery of the Smithsonian Institution. Pucker Gallery in Boston has presented multiple exhibitions of his work, and his work has also been shown by the Gallery Camino Real in Boca Raton, Florida. Additionally, the Schaller Gallery in Baroda, Michigan carries his work. He studied at Western Michigan University, and then later in his life he studied at the Japanese Master Potter Shurei Miura.

== Sources ==
K.T. Anders, "Hideaki Miyamura: A Man of 10,000 Glazes," 12 Clay Times No. 2 (March/April 2006).

Pucker Gallery, Pursuing the Eye of Heaven: Ceramics by Hideaki Miyamura, Introduction by Andrew L. Maske (Boston: 2005).
