= Hideaki Kobayashi (diplomat) =

Japanese diplomat

- 小林 秀明
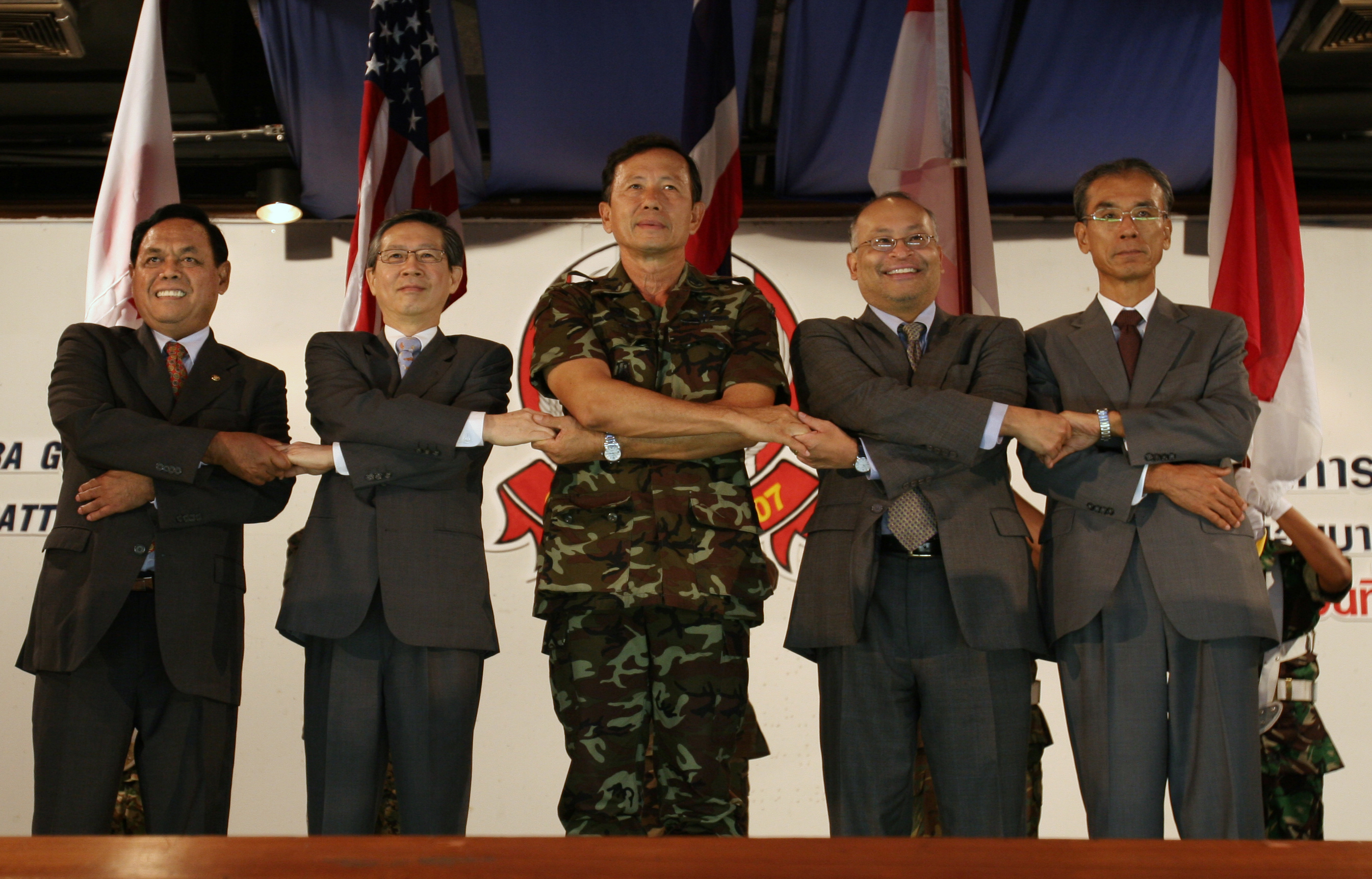
- Japanese Ambassador to Thailand (Kobayashi is on the right side)
- Born: December 12, 1945 (age 80); Nagano Prefecture, Japan
- Occupations: Japanese Diplomat and Ambassador
- Known for: Japanese Ambassador to Thailand

Hideaki Kobayashi (小林 秀明, Kobayashi Hideaki; born December 12, 1945) is a Japanese diplomat. He was born in Nagano Prefecture in 1945, and passed the Higher Diplomatic Service Examination in 1967. He entered the Japanese Ministry of Foreign Affairs in 1968, after graduating from the University of Tokyo's Public Law Faculty. He spent the year 1969–1970 at Carleton College. He spent his first years in the Ministry of Foreign Affairs at the Asian Affairs Bureau. From 1988 to 1990, he served as Counselor of the Japanese Embassy in Australia. From 1990 to 1992 he served as Counsellor of the Japanese Embassy in Poland. In the late 1990s and early 2000s, he sat as the Deputy Permanent Representative of Japan at the UN. From 2005 to 2008, he served as Japanese Ambassador to Thailand. While in Thailand, he participated in free trade negotiations with Prime Minister Thaksin Shinawatra.
