= Tricomi–Carlitz polynomials =

In mathematics, the Tricomi–Carlitz polynomials or (Carlitz–) Karlin–McGregor polynomials are polynomials studied by Tricomi (1951), Carlitz (1958), and Karlin and McGregor (1959), related to random walks on the positive integers.

They are given in terms of Laguerre polynomials by

$$\ell_n(x)=(-1)^nL_n^{(x-n)}(x).$$

They are special cases of the Chihara–Ismail polynomials.
