= Mohammad S. Obaidat =

American computer scientist

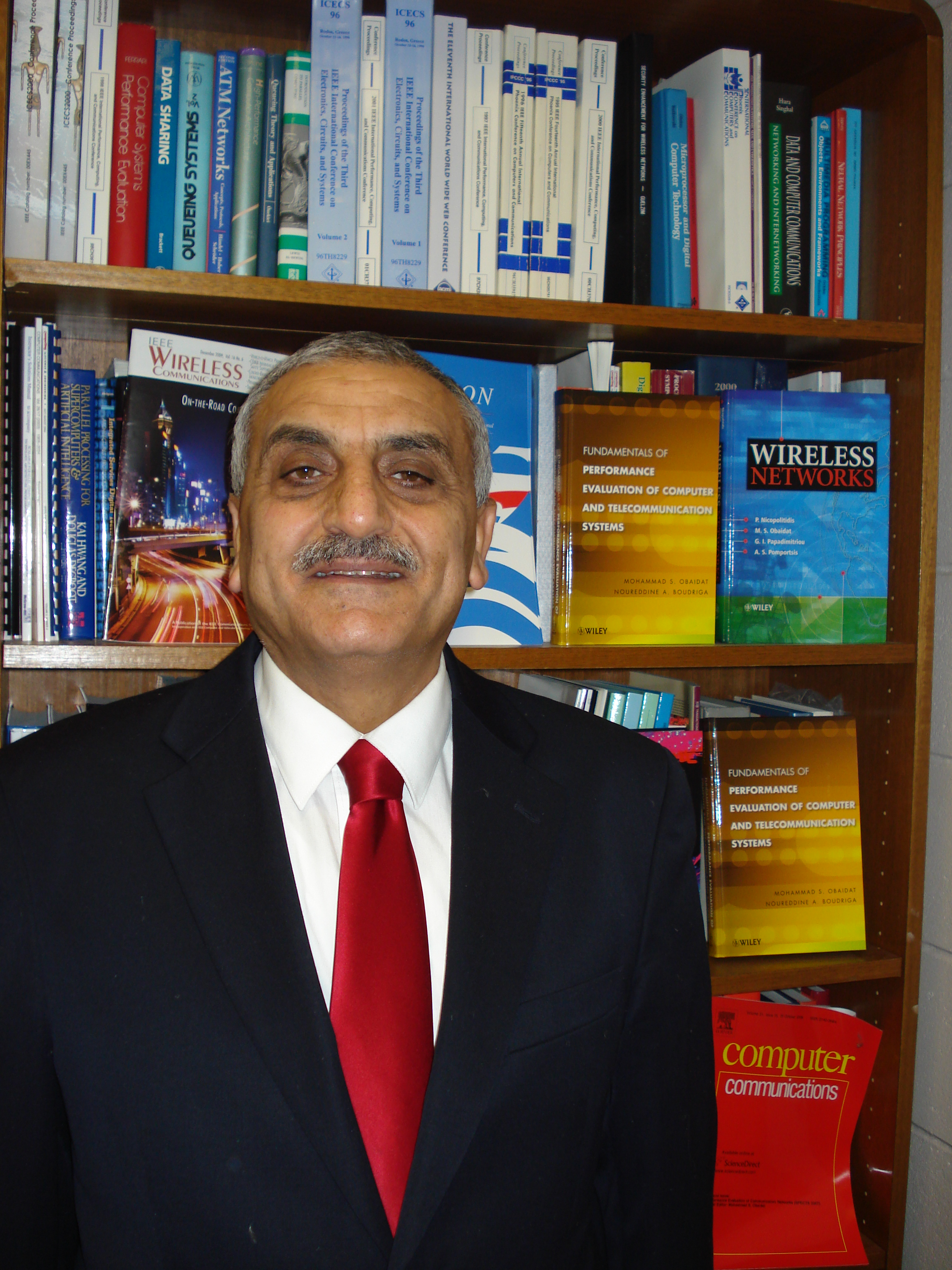
Mohammad S. Obaidat

Mohammad Salameh Obaidat is a Jordanian computer science/engineering academic and scholar, the President of and a Fellow of the Society for Modeling and Simulation International (SCS), and a Fellow of the Institute of Electrical and Electronics Engineers (IEEE) for contributions to adaptive learning, pattern recognition and system simulation.

Obaidat is the Chair and Professor of the Department of Computer and Information Science at Fordham University, NY, USA.

He was born in Jordan and received his M.S. and Ph.D. in computer engineering from the Ohio State University.

== Biography ==
Obaidat has held various positions in the past, including Advisor to Adnan Badran, the President of Jordan's Philadelphia University, who served in 2005 as the Prime Minister of Jordan.

Obaidat was a Fulbright Scholar to Jordan during the academic year 2004/2005. He served as Chair of the Department of Computer Science and the Graduate Studies Committee at Monmouth University.

Obaidat is the author or co-author of numerous books and refereed scholarly journal and conference papers.

He held visiting professorships at various universities, including Aberdeen University, UK, INSA-Rouen, France, Philadelphia University, Jordan, University of Seville, Spain, University of Oviedo, Spain, National Ilan University, Taiwan, Tamkang University, Taiwan, Korea Advanced Institute of Science and Technology (KAIST), South Korea, University of Girona, Spain, Genoa University, Italy, KFUPM, Saudi Arabia, Carthage University, Tunisia, EMI, Morocco, Torino Polytechnic, Italy, Bogazci University, Turkey, and International Islamic University Malaysia, Prince Sultan University, Saudi Arabia, Beihang University, China, Nanjing University of Posts & Telecommunications, China, Beijing University of Posts and Telecommunications (BUPT), China, University of Science and Technology Beijing, China, Fudan University, China, University of Calabria, Italy, Khalifa University, UAE, Huazhong University of Science and Technology, China.

He served as IEEE Computer Society Distinguished lecturer/visitor (1994–1997) and now is a distinguished lecturer for the Association for Computing Machinery (ACM) and SCS. His research interests encompass wireless systems, computer communication networking, cyber security, Learning Automata, Neural Networks, Parallel and Distributed Systems, Modeling and Simulation, Performance Evaluation of Computer and Telecommunication Systems, Telecommunications.

== Literary efforts ==
Since 1997, Obaidat has been the editor–in-chief of the International Journal of Communication Systems, published by John Wiley & Sons. Obaidat is the editor of the Journal of Convergence published by FTRA. He is currently Editor, Advisory editor, or editorial board member of many other scholarly journals and transactions including IEEE Wireless Communications.

== Awards ==
Obaidat has received many awards, including the SCS Hall of Fame Inductee - Life Achievement Award, SCS Presidential Service Award, SCS McLeod Founder's Award for his outstanding technical contribution to Computer modeling and simulation, the IEEE AICCSA 2009 Best Paper Award, the IEEE GLOBCOM 2009 Best Paper Award, the Nokia Research Fellowship Award, and the Fulbright Distinguished Scholar Award.

He was named an IEEE Fellow in 2005.
