= Hideo Kaneshiro =

Japan international rugby union player

- Born: Date of birth unknown Osaka, Japan
- University: Osaka University of Health and Sport Sciences

Rugby union career
- Position(s): Flanker, Hooker
Amateur team(s)
Years	Team	Apps	(Points)
19??-1991	Osaka University of Health and Sport Sciences		
Senior career
Years	Team	Apps	(Points)
19??-2000	Toyota		
International career
Years	Team	Apps	(Points)
1993	Japan	1	(0)

Hideo Kaneshiro (金城秀雄, Kaneshiro Hideo) (born Osaka, Japan) is a former rugby union footballer who played for Japan. Playing at flanker and as hooker, Kaneshiro played for Toyota Verblitz and had a cap for Japan against Argentina in Buenos Aires on 22 May 1993, being his only international test cap. He mostly played for Toyota Verblitz from 1991 - since he graduated from university - until his retirement in 2000.
