= Brenke–Chihara polynomials =

In mathematics, Brenke polynomials are special cases of generalized Appell polynomials, and Brenke–Chihara polynomials are the Brenke polynomials that are also orthogonal polynomials.

Brenke (1945) introduced sequences of Brenke polynomials P_{n}, which are special cases of generalized Appell polynomials with generating function of the form

$$A(w)B(xw)=\sum_{n=0}^\infty P_n(x)w^n.$$

Brenke observed that Hermite polynomials and Laguerre polynomials are examples of Brenke polynomials, and asked if there are any other sequences of orthogonal polynomials of this form. Geronimus (1947) found some further examples of orthogonal Brenke polynomials. Chihara (1968, 1971) completely classified all Brenke polynomials that form orthogonal sequences, which are now called Brenke–Chihara polynomials, and found their orthogonality relations.
