= Saleh Ajeery =

Kuwaiti astronomer (1920–2022)

Saleh Al Ajeery
- Born: Saleh Mohammed Saleh Abdulaziz Al Ajeery; 23 June 1920; Kuwait
- Died: 10 February 2022 (aged 101)
- Occupation: Astronomer

Saleh Mohammed Saleh Abdulaziz Al Ajeery (23 June 1920 – 10 February 2022) was a Kuwaiti astronomer.

He wrote many books and articles, and gave several seminars and lectures. Ajeery turned 100 in June 2020, and died on 10 February 2022, at the age of 101.

== See also ==
- Al Ajeery calendar
