= Tyndall National Institute =

Research centre in Cork, Ireland

Tyndall National Institute is a leading European research centre in integrated ICT (Information and Communications Technology) materials, devices and systems. It is one of Ireland’s five National Labs, specialising in both electronics and photonics. Tyndall works with industry and academia to transform research into products in its core market areas of electronics, communications, energy, health, agri-tech & the environment. With a network of over 200 industry partners and customers worldwide, they are focused on delivering human and economic impact from excellence in research. A research flagship of University College Cork, Tyndall is home to a research community of over 600 people of 52 nationalities.

== History ==
Tyndall is named after physicist John Tyndall. His interests spanned around the following – heat, sound, light and environmental phenomena.

John Tyndall is best known for the explanation of why the sky is blue. This is known as the Tyndall Effect. When sunlight passes through the atmosphere the light is scattered by small particles suspended in the atmosphere. The blue light that we see is known as Tyndall Blue.

John Tyndall developed a practical demonstration of the propagation of light though a tube of water via multiple internal reflections. This he referred to as the light-pipe, which was a forerunner of the optical fibre used in modern communications technology.

Tyndall was founded in the complex of buildings known as the “Lee Maltings”, Cork, Ireland. The site was first developed as a flour mill in 1787. The Lee Mill was the largest water-powered flour and corn milling installation at the time on the River Lee.

In 1797, just 10 years later, the mill became The River Lee Porter Brewery. The brewery operated until 1813, where it was taken over by Beamish & Crawford (B&C).

The Lee Maltings was bought by University College Cork in 1968 and converted to laboratories.

In 1979 a silicon wafer-fabrication laboratory was established to provide R&D and specialised training facilities for the semi-conductor manufacturing industry.

The National Microelectronics Research Centre (NMRC) was established in 1981.

Tyndall National Institute was established in 2004, under a formal agreement between the Minister for Enterprise, Trade & Innovation and UCC. Between 1981 and 2004, the institute was led by the following CEOs -

NMRC

- Prof Gerry Wrixon (Formerly NMRC): 1982 - 1999
- Prof Gabriel Crean (NMRC): 1999 - 2004

TYNDALL

- Dr Alastair Glass (acting): 2005
- Prof Roger W Whatmore: 2006 - 2012
- Dr Kieran F Drain: 2013 - 2017
- Prof William Scanlon: 2018 to present

== Infrastructure ==
Tyndall research facilities occupy six floors, including basement, laboratory, plant and open atrium space totaling c.5,600m2 in area.

The existing site comprises the Lee-Maltings Complex and some UCC teaching facilities. The site is a protected structure and consists of a number of buildings of varying age. The complex is bounded on its north side by the River Lee, on the west side by the Presentation College and on its south and east sides by Dyke Parade and Prospect Row.

The form of the Research Building stems primarily from its scientific and servicing requirements, as well as its relationship to the existing buildings and site. Three floors of flexible laboratory space were built over a tall ground floor and basement, which contains the specialist clean room areas.

== Research ==
As the national institute for micro/nanoelectronics and photonics, and a research flagship of University College Cork, Tyndall employs over 500 researchers, engineers and professional support staff, with a cohort of 120 full-time post graduate students. Together with UCC they generate around 250 peer-reviewed publications annually.

In 2019, Tyndall announced that it secured over €8m in European funding as part of the Horizon 2020 programme. Tyndall will lead four of the 15 international multi-partner projects which it won in 2019, including a major photonics pilot line for medical technologies, a Marie-Sklowdoska-Curie career development programme for 27 fellows, two energy projects and another in cryogenic electronics for quantum technologies.

This funding cements Tyndall as one of Europe's leading institutes in the area of ‘deep tech’, the use of majorly advanced technology that will have a profound effect on the lives of citizens, as well as industry. Deep tech is used in the areas of robotics, engineering, smart industry and medical devices.

Photonics

Photonics devices used in the generation, control and manipulation of light are changing the way in which society live their lives.

Key application areas:

- Highly functional, low-cost photonic integrated circuits are needed for widespread high-bandwidth broadband availability
- LEDs can provide visible light communications over short distances.
- With the evolution of data centres there is a critical need for much reduced energy usage.
- Light-based medical treatments and diagnostic tools will permit precise medical procedures and earlier detection of illness.
- Light based sensors can detect tiny amounts of gases and other materials as our environmental concerns grow which photovoltaics allows us to harness light energy.

Micro & Nano Systems

Tyndall Micro & Nano Systems Centre focuses on modelling and development of materials, devices and systems for integrated information and communications technology (ICT) applications.

Key research themes include:

- Emerging Materials & Devices - for applications ranging from low-power nanoelectronics to energy conversion to sensing.
- Micro-Power Platforms - for smart, connected "things", Internet of Things applications and autonomous devices.
- Integrated Circuit Design - low-power analogue & mixed signal and radio frequency.
- Integrated Sensors - for agri-food, the environment and healthcare.
- Systems Integration - for the future.
