= Essam E. Khalil =

Egyptian Mechanical Engineer (born 1948)

Essam Eldin Khalil
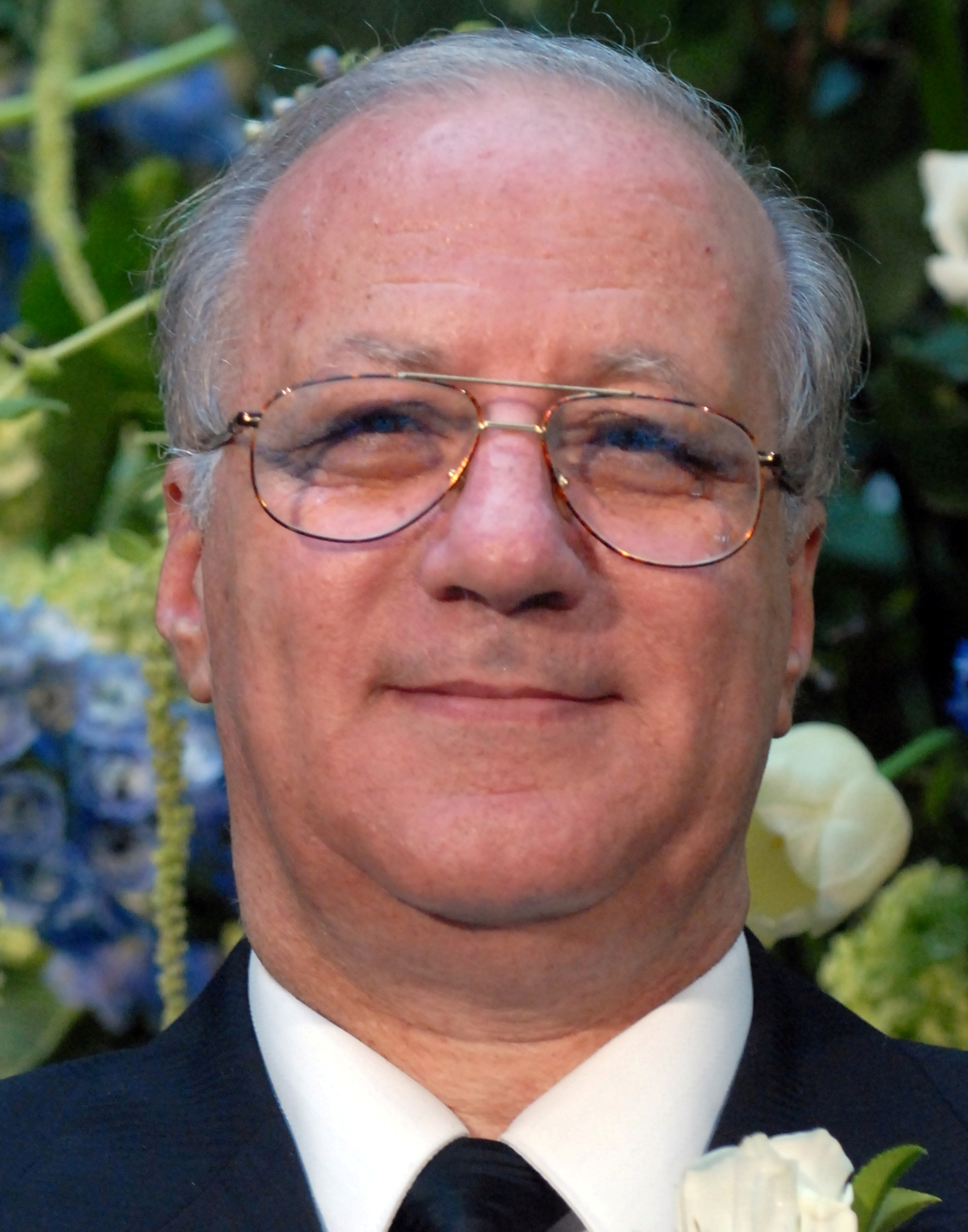
- Born: Essam Eldin Khalil Hassan Khalil; 12 July 1948; Scotland, United Kingdom
- Died: 7 September 2022 (aged 74); Cairo, Egypt
- Education: Cairo University
- Awards: National Award for Scientific Achievement in Engineering Sciences in (1981). **Order of Sciences and Arts (Egypt) from Egyptian President, 1st order, 1981 **Best Paper Award, AIAA, IECEC, August 2005 **ASME 2012 James Harry Potter Gold Medal 2012
- Scientific career
- Fields: Thermal power, combustion, environmental engineering and heat transfer

Essam Eldin Khalil Hassan Khalil (Egyptian Arabic: عصام الدين خليل حسن خليل; 12 July 1948 – 7 September 2022) was an Egyptian mechanical engineer. Khalil is a professor in the mechanical power department at Cairo University. He is the author and co-author of several international researches in HVAC field. He has many years of experience in delivering courses in air-conditioning to University, college students, to building managers and maintenance staff in both the industrial and commercial sectors in Egypt, the Arabian countries and worldwide. He has been selected by various universities and international organisations to lecture to graduate and post graduate level engineers, managers, supervisors and operating personnel on the subjects of HVAC design and optimisation, HVAC system management, energy utilization, waste heat recovery, plant management and other related subjects.

Khalil is ASME, AIAA and ASHRAE active fellow and is an ASHRAE distinguished lecturer on two topics; Ventilation of tombs of valley of kings and design of air conditioning systems for surgical operating theatres. The tombs include King Tutankh Amen, Ramses VII, Amhotep, Horemoheb, Ramses IV, V as well as Bay. It also includes the design of Air conditioning of the Hanging Church of Christ in Cairo.

Khalil is also the chairman of National HVAC Committee in Egypt, member of the National Energy Code Committee of Egypt and the chair of HVAC sub-group. He is a registered HVAC consultant and the president of the Arab Air Conditioning Code Committee. Khalil is the Convenor of ISO TC205 WG2 (Design of Energy Efficient Buildings) and is an active member of ISO TC163 Committee. He is the Chairman of Consulting Engineering Bureau, CEB.

== Biography ==
=== Academic accomplishments ===
Khalil achieved his M.Sc. Degree in Mechanical Engineering from Cairo University in December 1973. In February 1977 he was able to achieve his Ph.D. degree in Mechanical Engineering at London University, Imperial College of Science and Technology, UK. In 1977, the same year he achieved his Ph.D., Khalil acquired a Diploma of Imperial College at London University and a Postdoctoral Fellowship at Imperial College, London with the Support of Harwell Atomic Energy Research Establishment, United Kingdom. Khalil has published more than 700 papers on mechanical engineering.

=== Continual contribution ===
==== Research ====
Khalil is a productive contributors to the research in the fields of Combustion, Thermal Power and Heat Transfer. In addition to eight books, he has had more than 360 papers published some in journals and some papers discussed in symposiums.

==== Design consultancy ====
Khalil is a registered consultant who had contributions in major projects including ventilation of the tombs of the valley of kings, theatres and Cinema of Egypt, the Parliament of Egypt, studios, more than 64 big Hospitals, 15 luxurious hotels, more than 14 different buildings, fire fighting & detection design, hot water system, Laundry system, Kitchen system, Electric power supply works, light current and sound systems in factories, institutes and other various contributions.

== Awards and honors ==
Khalil achieved a number of awards and honors including:

- Cairo University Award of Excellence, May 2015
- Cairo University Award of Excellence, April 2014
- ASME Egypt Achievement Award, April 2013
- University of Wisconsin, Milwaukee Distinguished Lecture Award, January 2013
- Cairo University Award of Excellence, January 2013
- ASME 2012 James Harry Potter Gold Medal, 2012
- Cairo University Award of Excellence, July 2012
- ASHRAE 2011 Distinguished Services Award, 2011
- AIAA 2011 Sustained Service Award, 2011
- ASHRAE 2010 Regional Award of Merit, 2010
- AIAA Energy Systems Award, 2010
- Cairo University Award of Excellence, July 2010
- ASME/George Westinghouse Gold Medal, 2009
- ASHRAE Fellow Award, 2009
- ASHRAE Chapter Service Award, October 2009
- ASHRAE Presidential Award of Excellence, Sustainability Activities, October 2009
- Cairo University Award of Excellence, April 2009
- AIAA Fellow Award, 2008
- Best Paper Award, AIAA, IECEC, July 2008
- Cairo University Award of Excellence, June 2007
- Member of L’Institut D’Egypte, April 2007
- Cairo University Award of Excellence, April 2006
- Best Paper Award, AIAA, IECEC, August 2005
- ASME Fellow Award 2003
- ESME Fellow Award, 1991
- National Award for Scientific Achievement in Engineering Sciences in (1981).
- Decor Of Science And Arts From Egyptian President, 1st Order, 1981

== Books published in the field of Mechanical Engineering ==
1. FLOW, MIXING & HEAT TRANSFER IN FURNACES (WITH K.H. KHALIL & F. M. ELMAHALLAWY) H.M.T. SERIES-VOLUMES 2, PERGAMON PRESS. JUNE-1978.
2. HEAT & FLUID IN POWER SYSTEM COMPONENTS (WITH A.M. RESK & M. M.KAMEL)
3. H.M.T. SERIES VOLUME 3, PERGAMON PRESS. NOVEMBER- 1979.
4. MODELING OF FURNACES & COMBUSTORS. ABACUS PRESS, 1ST ED 1983.
5. LASER TECHNOLOGY, GEBO, Egypt, 1987 (In Arabic)
6. POWER PLANT DESIGN. ABACUS PRESS, GORDON & BREECH 1990.
7. ENERGY FUTURE, ACADEMIC BOOKSHOP PUBLISHERS, 1999 (In Arabic)
8. WATER DESALINATION, ACADEMIC BOOKSHOP PUBLISHERS, 1999 (In Arabic)
9. Types and Performance of Pumps and Compressors, UNESCO_Ellos, 2012
10. Air Conditioning Of Hospitals And Healthcare Facilities, Lap Lambert Publishing, 2012,ISBN 978-3-659-30776-8
11. Air Distribution in Buildings, Taylor & Francis, CRC Press, 2013, ISBN 978-1-466-59463-0
12. Boiler Furnace Design, Lap Lambert Publishing, 2013, ISBN 978-3-659-31710-1
13. Energy Efficiency in the Urban Environment, with (Heba Khalil), Taylor & Francis, CRC Press, 2015, ISBN 1482250632, ISBN 978-1482250633
