= Lina Jamil Karam =

Lebanese-American engineer

Lina J. Karam is a Lebanese-American electrical and computer engineer and inventor. She is an IEEE Fellow. Her areas of work span digital signal processing, image/video processing, compression/coding and transmission, computer vision, machine learning/deep learning, perceptual-based visual processing, and automated mobility. She served as an expert delegate of the ISO/IEC JTC1/SC29 Committee (Coding of audio, picture, multimedia and hypermedia information) and participated in JPEG/MPEG standardization activities. She served as expert consultant in matters related to Intellectual Property/Patent Litigation, Image/Video Compression and Streaming, Image/Video Processing, Computer Vision, Imaging, Artificial Intelligence, Machine Learning, Robotics and Autonomous Driving.

== Education ==
Lina J. Karam received a Bachelor of Engineering from the American University of Beirut in 1992, as well as MS and PhD degrees in Electrical Engineering from the Georgia Institute of Technology in 1995. Her PhD supervisor is James H. McClellan. As part of her PhD work, she introduced a new function approximation theory that enabled the development of a new efficient algorithm for the design of optimal equiripple digital Finite-Impulse Response (FIR) filters with arbitrary magnitude and phase responses. She also developed theory and algorithms for the efficient design of multi-dimensional complex-valued FIR filters with arbitrary magnitude and phase responses. Her seminal work on digital filtering has been widely adopted by engineers, scientists, and researchers for the development of improved applications and products in various signal processing, telecommunications, electromagnetic, and biomedical applications, including geophysical processing, magnetic resonance imaging, low-delay filtering, channel equalization, and antenna design, among others. Dr. Karam's digital filter design algorithm has been integrated in the MATLAB Signal Processing Toolbox (as the cfirpm function).

== Career ==
During her PhD, she interned at Schlumberger in Austin, Texas, where she worked on data visualization, and at AT&T Bell Labs (Murray Hill, New Jersey), where she worked on low bit-rate video compression and developed color video codecs.

After receiving her PhD degree at the Georgia Institute of Technology in 1995, she joined Arizona State University where she became a professor of Electrical and Computer Engineering, Program Chair and Director of the Computer Engineering Program, and the Director of the Image, Video, & Usability Laboratory. In 2020, she was appointed as the Dean of the School of Engineering at the Lebanese American University in Lebanon and became the first woman to hold a Dean of Engineering position in the Middle East. Dr. Karam is currently an emerita Professor at Arizona State University. In 2025, she was elected as Vice President-Membership of the IEEE Signal Processing Society for a three-year term (2026-2028). Dr. Karam led R&D and product development for image and video processing, imaging, image and video coding, computer vision, visual communication, quality assessment, sensing, AI/machine learning, robotics and autonomous driving with various industries.

She has been the recipient of various awards, including the National Science Foundation CAREER Award, the NASA Technical Innovation Award, the Intel Outstanding Researcher Award, the IEEE Signal Processing Society’s Best Journal Paper Award, the IEEE Phoenix Section Outstanding Faculty Award, and the IEEE Region 6 Award. She has been an invited keynote/plenary/guest speaker at various technical events, conferences, and industries. She has directed numerous funded projects that led to successful technology transfer with industry partners. She recently initiated an academia-industry Silicon Valley partnership program, and participated as a judge in the Embedded Vision Summit's Vision Tank 2019, a competition event held in Silicon Valley for startup companies. She initiated and helped in establishing the World's First Visual Innovation Award in 2016 and the World's First Multimedia Star Innovator Award in 2019.

Dr. Karam has led interdisciplinary university-industry-government initiatives for defining the next-generation of safe and efficient automated mobility at scale and served as the lead guest editor of special issues on autonomous driving (Special Issue on Autonomous Driving: Sensing and Perception and Special Issue on Autonomous Driving: Learning and Cognition). On October 30, 2018, Dr. Karam was featured on FOX 10 News in a segment on driverless cars and in a news article in the Phoenix Business Review Journal on Waymo's Self-Driving Truck Testing. She also participated in a podcast and in various panels on self-driving cars and smart cities including panels organized for law professionals, local cities, and public outreach. She served as ADAS lead advisor as part of the DoE/GM-sponsored Advanced Vehicular Technologies (AVTC) EcoCAR3 competition.

During her work overseas (2020–2022), Dr. Karam initiated in 2021 the first ENPMED (Engineering PreMed) program incorporating a Premed track in all engineering majors. She also led renewable energy initiatives with a consortium of industry partners, USAID Trade and Investment Facilitation (USAID-TIF)], and the United Nations Development Programme (UNDP) to help advance the Renewable Energy/Solar Industry Sector in Lebanon. She established iLEAP (industry-focused Lebanese Education & Academia Partnership) in collaboration with LebNET, a non-profit US organization focused on education and mentoring, and comprising a network of technology experts, Fortune 500 managers and executives, venture capitalists and investors, startup founders and entrepreneurs, academics, consultants and small business owner in North America. As one of the lead PIs, she secured a collaborative multi-million grant from the United States Department of State to help boost employment opportunities in the MENA region in collaboration with the American University of Beirut (lead institution) and the Georgia Institute of Technology. As part of this collaboration, she initiated the award-winning VIP+ program, adapting the Georgia Tech's Vertically Integrated Projects (VIP) model by integrating an explicit entrepreneurial component into VIP, and served as VIP+ program director; the established VIP+ program was granted three awards in 2022 by the International VIP Consortium, including the Innovation in Program Enhancement Award, the Innovation in Partnership Building Award, and First-Place Winner of the 2022 VIP Consortium Innovation Competition. The VIP Consortium consists of 44 institutions in 13 countries, with 25 institutions in the US.

Dr. Karam has over 250 technical publications and is an inventor on 8 issued US patents. From 2019 to 2021, she served as Editor-in-Chief of the IEEE Journal of Selected Topics in Signal Processing. She is a member of the National Academy of Inventors, ASU Chapter. She served on the IEEE Publication Services and Products Board (PSPB) Strategic Planning Committee, IEEE Joint TAB/PSPB Product and Services Committee, IEEE Educational Activities Board Faculty Resources Committee, IEEE Industry Engagement Committee, IEEE Signal Processing Society's (SPS) Executive Committee, IEEE SPS Board of Governors, IEEE Circuits and Systems’ Fellow Evaluation Committee, IEEE SPS Conference Board, Publications Board, Award Board, and Membership Board (as its Chair) as well as on technical committees and on editorial boards of several high-impact journals. She served as General Co-chair of IEEE ICME 2019, General Chair for IEEE ICIP 2016, Technical Program Chair for IEEE ICIP 2009, and General Chair for the 2011 IEEE DSP/SPE Workshops. She co-founded the international QoMEX conference. She served as a member of the IEEE Signal Processing Society's (SPS) Image, Video & Multidimensional Signal Processing Technical Committee, IEEE SPS Multimedia Technical Committee, and the IEEE Circuits and Systems Society's DSP Technical Committee.
