= Konhauser polynomials =

In mathematics, the Konhauser polynomials, introduced by Joseph Konhauser, are biorthogonal polynomials for the distribution function of the Laguerre polynomials.
