= Theodore Seio Chihara =

American mathematician (1929–2026)

Theodore Seio Chihara (March 14, 1929 – February 11, 2026) was an American mathematician working on orthogonal polynomials who introduced Al-Salam–Chihara polynomials, Brenke–Chihara polynomials, and Chihara–Ismail polynomials. His brother was composer Paul Chihara. He earned his PhD from Purdue University, where his thesis advisor was Arthur Rosenthal. Chihara died on February 11, 2026, at the age of 96.

== Publications ==
- Chihara, Theodore Seio (1978), An introduction to orthogonal polynomials, Mathematics and its Applications, vol. 13, New York: Gordon and Breach Science Publishers, ISBN 978-0-677-04150-6, MR 0481884, Reprinted by Dover 2011
- Chihara, Theodore Seio (2001), "45 years of orthogonal polynomials: a view from the wings", Proceedings of the Fifth International Symposium on Orthogonal Polynomials, Special Functions and their Applications (Patras, 1999), Journal of Computational and Applied Mathematics, 133 (1): 13–21, doi:10.1016/S0377-0427(00)00632-4, ISSN 0377-0427, MR 1858267

== Sources ==
- Askey, Richard; Ismail, Mourad E. H.; Van Assche, Walter (2001), "Ted Chihara and his work on orthogonal polynomials", Proceedings of the Fifth International Symposium on Orthogonal Polynomials, Special Functions and their Applications (Patras, 1999), Journal of Computational and Applied Mathematics, 133 (1): 1–11, doi:10.1016/S0377-0427(00)00631-2, ISSN 0377-0427, MR 1858266
- Theodore Seio Chihara at the Mathematics Genealogy Project
