= Hideki Chihara =

Japanese composer

- Born: 5 November 1957 (age 68); Fukui, Japan
- Other name: 千原 英喜
- Occupation: composer

Hideki Chihara (千原 英喜, 5 November 1957) is a Japanese composer known for his choral compositions.

== Style ==
One of the features of his work is that he interviews Japan traditional music and classics and links them with Western music (especially Christian chants).

Under the theme of "Music transcends time and space", he is mainly engaged in the following four compositional activities.

1, Japan identity = Japanese style of classical traditional materials

2, The universality of east–west prayer = Christian chant and Edo Christian.

3, Japanese song = POP / Enka

4, Classic Transcription = Choral arrangement of classical songs.

His style that purifies the vernacular is also prominent in instrumental music works, and he develops a wide range of creations. He draws out "Japan" from his own sense of beauty and harmony of sound.
