= Rogers polynomials =

Family of orthogonal polynomials

In mathematics, the Rogers polynomials, also called the Rogers–Askey–Ismail polynomials or continuous q-ultraspherical polynomials, are a family of orthogonal polynomials introduced by Leonard James Rogers in the course of his work on the Rogers–Ramanujan identities. They are q-analogs of ultraspherical polynomials, and are the Macdonald polynomials for the special case of the A_{1} affine root system.

The Rogers polynomials can be defined in terms of the q-Pochhammer symbol by

$$C_n(x;\beta|q) = \frac{(\beta;q)_n}{(q;q)_n}e^{in\theta} {}_2\phi_1(q^{-n},\beta;\beta^{-1}q^{1-n};q,q\beta^{-1}e^{-2i\theta})$$

where ${}_2\phi_1$ is the basic hypergeometric series and $x=\cos\theta$.

Askey & Ismail (1983) and Gasper & Rahman (2004, section 7.4) discuss the properties of Rogers polynomials in detail.
