= Waleed Al-Salam =

Iraqi mathematician

Waleed Al-Salam (born 15 July 1926 in Baghdad, Iraq – died 14 April 1996 in Edmonton, Canada) was a mathematician who introduced Al-Salam–Chihara polynomials, Al-Salam–Carlitz polynomials, q-Konhauser polynomials, and Al-Salam–Ismail polynomials. He was a Professor Emeritus at the University of Alberta.

Born in Iraq, Baghdad, Al-Salam received his bachelor's degree in engineering physics (1950) and M.A. in mathematics (1951) from University of California Berkeley. He completed his education at Duke, receiving his Ph.D. for his dissertation on Bessel polynomials (1958).
