= Al-Salam–Ismail polynomials =

In mathematics, the Al-Salam–Ismail polynomials are a family of orthogonal polynomials introduced by Waleed Al-Salam and Mourad Ismail.
