= Al-Salam–Chihara polynomials =

Family of basic hypergeometric orthogonal polynomials in the basic Askey scheme

In mathematics, the Al-Salam–Chihara polynomials Q_{n}(x;a,b;q) are a family of basic hypergeometric orthogonal polynomials in the basic Askey scheme, introduced by Al-Salam and Chihara (1976). Roelof Koekoek, Peter A. Lesky, and René F. Swarttouw (2010, 14.8) give a detailed list of the properties of Al-Salam–Chihara polynomials.

== Definition ==
The Al-Salam–Chihara polynomials are given in terms of basic hypergeometric functions and the q-Pochhammer symbol by

$$Q_n(x;a,b;q) = \frac{(ab;q)_n}{a^n}{}_3\phi_2(q^{-n}, ae^{i\theta}, ae^{-i\theta}; ab,0; q,q)$$

where x = cos(θ).
