= Chihara–Ismail polynomials =

In mathematics, the Chihara–Ismail polynomials are a family of orthogonal polynomials introduced by Chihara and Ismail (1982), generalizing the van Doorn polynomials introduced by van Doorn (1981) and the Karlin–McGregor polynomials. They have a rather unusual measure, which is discrete except for a single limit point at 0 with jump 0, and is non-symmetric, but whose support has an infinite number of both positive and negative points.
