= List of Egyptian Americans =

This is a list of notable Egyptian Americans, including both original immigrants who obtained American citizenship and their American descendants.

To be included in this list, the person must have a Wikipedia article showing they are Egyptian American or must have references showing they are Egyptian American and are notable.

== Academia and science ==
- Abbas El Gamal (1950–present), Hitachi America Professor in the School of Engineering and former Chair of the Department of Electrical Engineering at Stanford University. A pioneer in information theory and VLSI systems, he holds over 30 patents and has co-founded several Silicon Valley companies. El-Gamal was awarded the Claude E. Shannon Award in 2012, for his seminal contributions to Network Information Theory.
- Abdel-Moniem El-Ganayni, nuclear physicist and former senior scientist at Bettis Atomic Power Laboratory.
- Abdelrahman Mohamed (AI Researcher), AI scientist known for his research on deep learning for speech recognition and self-supervised speech representation learning. As a doctoral student at the University of Toronto under Geoffrey Hinton and Gerald Penn, he was part of the group that first applied deep belief networks to acoustic modelling, work that is credited with starting the deep learning era in speech recognition. He later created the HuBERT model and co-developed wav2vec 2.0 at Meta AI.
- Adam Hamawy, reconstructive surgeon and former United States Army combat surgeon. He is known for treating casualties during the Iraq War, including Tammy Duckworth, and for later humanitarian medical work in Gaza.
- Adel Mahmoud (1941–2018), former President of the Vaccine division at Merck & Co. and a professor at Princeton University. He was a global leader in public health and infectious diseases, responsible for the development of several breakthrough vaccines, including those for HPV, rotavirus, and shingles.
- Afaf Meleis (born 1942), Dean Emerita of Nursing at the University of Pennsylvania. An internationally renowned nurse-scientist and medical sociologist, she developed the influential "Transitions Theory" to improve global women's health and immigrant healthcare.
- Ahmed Ghoniem, professor of mechanical engineering at MIT, where he directs the Center for Energy and Propulsion Research and the Reacting Gas Dynamics Laboratory.
- Ahmed Hassanein, Paul L. Wattelet Distinguished Professor of Nuclear Engineering and Director of the Center for Materials under Extreme Environments (CMUXE) at Purdue University. He is a world-renowned expert in modeling material responses to radiation, crucial for fusion energy and nanolithography.
- Ahmed I. Zayed, mathematician and Professor at DePaul University. His work focuses on mathematical analysis, generalized functions, and signal processing, particularly in the advancement of Shannon’s sampling theory.
- Ahmed Rashad Abdel-khalik, scholar of accounting and V. K. Zimmerman Professor of International Accounting at the University of Illinois Urbana–Champaign.
- Ahmed Sameh, Samuel D. Conte Professor Emeritus of Computer Science at Purdue University. He is a pioneer in parallel numerical algorithms and high-performance computing, particularly in the field of linear algebra.
- Ahmed Subhy Mansour, Islamic scholar and former assistant professor at Al-Azhar University. Known as the founder of the "Quranist" movement, he has been a Visiting Fellow at Harvard Law School, focusing on the intersection of Islamic law, democracy, and human rights.
- Ahmed Tewfik (1960–present), Cockrell Family Chair in Engineering at the University of Texas at Austin and President of the IEEE Signal Processing Society. He is recognized for his leadership in signal processing and for significantly increasing diversity in engineering education.
- Ahmed Zewail (1946–2016), Nobel laureate in Chemistry (1999). Known as the "father of femtochemistry," he was the Linus Pauling Chair Professor at Caltech and was the first Egyptian scientist to win a Nobel Prize in a scientific field for his work on ultrafast laser spectroscopy.
- Alan Mikhail, historian and Chace Family Professor of History at Yale University. He is known for his work on Ottoman, Middle Eastern, and environmental history, and for helping establish the field of Middle East environmental history.
- Alexander Badawy, Egyptologist who taught in the United States as a professor of art history at UCLA and later endowed the Alexander Badawy Chair in Egyptian Art and Archaeology at Johns Hopkins University.
- Alex Hanna, sociologist and director of research at the Distributed AI Research Institute whose work focuses on computational social science, algorithmic bias, and fairness in machine learning. She is also the co-author of The AI Con.
- Ali S. Hadi, statistician and emeritus professor at Cornell University, and founder of the actuarial science program at The American University in Cairo.
- Albert Fathi, professor of mathematics at the Georgia Institute of Technology, specializing in dynamical systems. Fathi is a winner of the Sophie Germain Prize.
- Allen Adham, Egyptian-American businessman and computer scientist. He is a co-founder of Blizzard Entertainment (originally Silicon & Synapse) and served as the company's first president, overseeing the creation of foundational gaming franchises like Warcraft, StarCraft, and Diablo.
- Amanie Abdelmessih, engineering educator specializing in mechanical engineering and heat transfer. She is a professor of mechanical engineering at California Baptist University.
- Amr Awadallah, co-founder of Cloudera and former VP at Google.
- Amr El Abbadi, Distinguished Professor of Computer Science at the University of California, Santa Barbara. A fellow of the IEEE and ACM, he is a leading expert in fault-tolerant distributed systems and large-scale database management.
- Ayaad Assaad (1948–present), microbiologist and toxicologist. Formerly a scientist at the United States Army Medical Research Institute of Infectious Diseases (USAMRIID), he has specialized in the study of environmental toxins and chemical defense.
- Ayman El-Baz, bioengineer and chair of the Department of Bioengineering at the University of Louisville, known for his work in medical imaging, artificial intelligence, and computer-aided diagnosis.
- Ayman El-Mohandes, epidemiologist, and dean of the CUNY Graduate School of Public Health and Health Policy since 2013.
- Azer Bestavros, Egyptian-born American computer scientist and the William Fairfield Warren Distinguished Professor of Computer Science and inaugural Associate Provost for Computing & Data Sciences at Boston University. He is known for his work in distributed computing, networking, and trustworthy computing.
- Bahgat G. Sammakia, Vice President for Research and Distinguished Professor of Mechanical Engineering at Binghamton University. He served as the interim President of SUNY Polytechnic Institute and is a specialist in the thermal management of microelectronics.
- Charles Issawi, economist and historian of the Middle East who taught at Columbia University and Princeton University and helped shape the study of modern Middle Eastern economic history.
- Dina H. Sherif, academic, development expert, and entrepreneur who serves as executive director of the MIT Kuo Sharper Center for Prosperity and Entrepreneurship at MIT. She is also a founding partner of Ahead of the Curve, a Cairo-based advisory and investment firm focused on social entrepreneurship and inclusive growth.
- Ehab Abouheif, evolutionary developmental biologist and professor at Zhejiang University, formerly a James McGill Professor at McGill University; known for research on ant evolution and dormant ancestral developmental potential; recipient of a Guggenheim Fellowship (2017).
- Emad Shahin, Dean of the College of Islamic Studies at Hamad Bin Khalifa University and former professor at Georgetown University and Columbia University. He is a prominent political scientist specializing in political Islam and democratization in the Middle East.
- Eman Ghoneim, geomorphologist and Professor at the University of North Carolina Wilmington. She is a pioneer in using satellite remote sensing data to detect subsurface groundwater and ancient river structures, notably discovering a massive "mega-lake" in the Darfur region of Sudan.
- Essam Heggy, planetary scientist at NASA's Jet Propulsion Laboratory and a member of the Mars Express and Rosetta missions. He has served as a science adviser to the President of Egypt, focusing on water security and climate change.
- Fadi Chehadé, information technology executive and entrepreneur who founded RosettaNet and later served as chief executive officer of ICANN. He is known for his leadership in internet governance and technology-industry standards.
- Fadwa El Guindi (born 1941), Egyptian-American anthropologist and former professor of anthropology at Qatar University, known for ethnographic works including The Myth of Ritual and By Noon Prayer.
- Fathi Osman (1928–2010), Egyptian-American Islamic scholar and author who wrote on Islamic reform, pluralism, human rights, and interfaith understanding.
- Farouk El-Baz (1938–present), research professor and Director of the Center for Remote Sensing at Boston University. He was a leading scientist in the Apollo program, where he assisted in site selection and trained astronauts in lunar observations.
- François M. Abboud (born January 5, 1931), cardiologist, medical researcher, and academic administrator. Professor emeritus of internal and cardiovascular medicine at Carver College of Medicine at the University of Iowa.
- Gamal Refai-Ahmed, engineer and technical executive known for contributions to thermal management, silicon architecture, and advanced packaging technologies. His career has included senior technical roles at AMD, GE, Cisco, and Nortel.
- Gawdat Bahgat, political scientist and professor at the National Defense University whose scholarship focuses on energy security, nuclear proliferation, terrorism, and Middle East politics.
- Georges Abi-Saab, lawyer, professor of international law, and international judge known for his defense of Third World interests within international law.
- Hala Halim, academic and translator who has written on literature and culture and teaches in the Middle Eastern and Islamic Studies department at New York University.
- Hany Farid, Professor at the University of California, Berkeley and a pioneer in digital forensics. His research focuses on the detection of altered digital media and the development of tools to combat "deepfakes" and online misinformation.
- Hasan M. El-Shamy (born 1938), Egyptian-born American folklorist and professor emeritus at Indiana University Bloomington, known for scholarship on Arab, African, and Middle Eastern folk traditions.
- Hassan Aref (1950–2011), theoretical and computational physicist. He was the Dean of Engineering at Virginia Tech and is celebrated for discovering the concept of "chaotic advection," which revolutionized the study of fluid mixing.
- Hassan Hathout (1924–2009), doctor, professor of medicine, writer, and theologian known for his work in medical ethics and interfaith dialogue.
- Hassan K. Khalil, electrical engineer and University Distinguished Professor Emeritus at Michigan State University, known for his work in nonlinear control.
- Heba Kadry, Egyptian-born, US-based mastering engineer. A prominent figure in music technology and acoustics, she has worked with artists like Björk and Ryuichi Sakamoto and is one of the few women globally recognized in the highly technical field of audio mastering.
- Helmy Eltoukhy, electrical engineer and biotech entrepreneur. He is the co-founder and CEO of Guardant Health, a leader in precision oncology and liquid biopsy technology for cancer detection.
- Henri Dorra (1924–2002), Egyptian-born American art historian and educator. A specialist in French Symbolist art, he was Professor Emeritus of History of Art and Architecture at the University of California, Santa Barbara.
- Ibrahim Oweiss (1931–present), economist and Professor Emeritus at Georgetown University. He is credited with coining the term "Petrodollar" and has served as an economic advisor to multiple governments and international organizations.
- Ihab Hassan, influential literary theorist whose work was foundational to the study of postmodernism. He served as a professor at the University of Wisconsin–Milwaukee and authored numerous books on American literature and culture.
- Ihab Ilyas (born May 13, 1973), computer scientist who works in data science. He is currently a Professor Emeritus of computer science in the David R. Cheriton School of Computer Science at the University of Waterloo and he is the co-founder and CEO of hiddenweights, a startup for building efficient custom AI. Ilyas completed his PhD in Purdue University and started two US incorporated businesses, Tamr and hiddenweights.
- Irene Ghobrial, physician and professor at the Dana–Farber Cancer Institute and Harvard Medical School whose research focuses on early detection of multiple myeloma.
- Karam Soliman (born 1944), pharmacologist and Distinguished Professor of pharmaceutical sciences at Florida A&M University, where he has also served as Associate Dean for Research and Graduate Studies.
- Kareem El-Badry (born 1994), astronomer and astrophysicist. He is an assistant professor of astronomy at the California Institute of Technology.. Kareem is known for discovering Gaia BH1, the nearest known black hole to the Earth.
- Kareem Mohamed Abu-Elmagd (born 1952), Egyptian-American organ transplant surgeon and professor of surgery at Case Western Reserve University, best known for pioneering clinical intestinal transplantation and multivisceral transplantation.
- Kawthar Zaki, electrical engineer and professor emerita at the University of Maryland, College Park, known for her work in microwave engineering.
- Khaled Abou El Fadl, Omar and Azmeralda Alfi Distinguished Professor in Islamic Law at the UCLA School of Law. He is one of the world's leading authorities on Shari'ah and Islamic jurisprudence, advocating for human rights and moderate reform.
- Khaled J. Saleh, orthopaedic surgeon and researcher specializing in adult reconstruction and joint replacement surgery.
- Laila Shereen Sakr, digital media theorist, artist, and assistant professor at the University of California, Santa Barbara, known for founding the R-Shief digital lab.
- Lambros D. Callimahos, Alexandria-born US Army cryptologist and a flute player.
- Leila Ahmed (1940–present), Victor S. Thomas Professor of Divinity at Harvard Divinity School. She is a foundational scholar in Islamic feminism and the author of the landmark book Women and Gender in Islam.
- Linda Manzanilla, New York–born Mexican archaeologist of Egyptian descent, known for her research on Teotihuacan; professor at the National Autonomous University of Mexico and international member of the National Academy of Sciences.
- M. Cherif Bassiouni (1937–2017), Egyptian-American emeritus professor of law at DePaul University and a leading scholar of international criminal law.
- Magid Abou-Gharbia, medicinal chemist and pharmaceutical researcher who has worked in both the pharmaceutical industry and academia. He is a Laura H. Carnell Professor of Pharmaceutical Sciences at the Temple University School of Pharmacy and was the founding director of the Moulder Center for Drug Discovery Research. Before joining Temple, he spent 26 years at Wyeth, where he held senior research and management positions in drug discovery. His research and leadership have been associated with the development of pharmaceutical compounds, including candidates that resulted in marketed drugs.
- Mamoun Fandy, political scientist and author specializing in Middle Eastern politics. He has taught at Georgetown University and the National Defense University, and is the author of Saudi Arabia and the Politics of Dissent.
- Mark A. Gabriel (born 1957), lecturer and writer on Islam, and author of several books critical of Salafi Islam.
- Mary Bishai, physicist and Distinguished Scientist at Brookhaven National Laboratory. In 2023, she was elected co-spokesperson of the Deep Underground Neutrino Experiment and is a Fellow of the American Physical Society.
- Mary-Jane Deeb, American Middle East expert, librarian, and novelist who worked at the Library of Congress, where she served as Chief of the African and Middle Eastern Division.
- Maha Ashour-Abdalla (1943–2016), Professor of Physics and Astronomy at UCLA. She founded the UCLA Center for Digital Innovation and was a leading researcher in space plasma physics and magnetospheric dynamics.
- Mahmoud ElSohly, research professor at the University of Mississippi and director of the Marijuana Research Project. He is a leading pharmacologist known for his work on the chemical analysis of cannabis and the development of pharmaceutical-grade cannabinoids.
- Marty Makary, physician and Professor of Surgery at the Johns Hopkins School of Medicine. A prominent healthcare technologist and medical writer, he is known for his work in surgical quality and health services research, and he serves as an advisor to several healthtech organizations.
- Matthew Shenoda, poet and academic whose work explores the intersections of African and Arab identities. He has published several collections, including Somewhere Else and Tahrir Suite, and serves as a high-ranking university administrator.
- Medhat Haroun (1951–2012), Professor and former Provost of the American University in Cairo. A renowned expert in earthquake engineering, his work influenced international building codes for dams and liquid storage tanks.
- Michael Mina, epidemiologist, immunologist, and physician formerly affiliated with the Harvard T.H. Chan School of Public Health and Harvard Medical School. He is known for his research on infectious disease immunity, including work on measles-associated immune amnesia, and for promoting rapid antigen testing as a public-health tool during the COVID-19 pandemic
- Michel Barsoum, materials scientist and Distinguished Professor at Drexel University in the Department of Materials Science and Engineering. Known for his work with MAX phases, and for research that led to the development of MXenes, a family of two-dimensional materials derived from MAX phases.
- Minouche Shafik, economist who has served as the President of Columbia University and Director of the London School of Economics. She was previously the youngest-ever Vice President of the World Bank and Deputy Governor of the Bank of England.
- Moeness Amin, Professor of Electrical and Computer Engineering and Director of the Center for Advanced Communications at Villanova University. He is a recipient of the IEEE Dennis J. Picard Medal for his contributions to radar imaging and signal processing.
- Mohamed Abdou, nuclear engineer and director of the Fusion Science and Technology Center and the Center for Energy Science & Technology Advanced Research.
- Mohamed Abdou, political scientist and scholar of Islamic studies, anarchism and decolonial theory; author of Islam and Anarchism: Relationships and Resonances (2022) and former visiting assistant professor at Columbia University.
- Mohamed Atalla (1924–2009), engineer and physicist. He invented the MOSFET (the most widely manufactured device in history) and pioneered the process of surface passivation. The breakthrough of fabricating a practical field-effect transistor, enabled by Atalla’s earlier work on silicon surface passivation and thermal oxidation, revolutionized electronics and paved the way for smaller and cheaper radios, calculators, computers, and other electronic devices.
- Mohamed El-Genk, Distinguished Professor of Nuclear Engineering and Director of the Institute for Space and Nuclear Power Studies at the University of New Mexico. He is an expert in space nuclear power systems and thermal-hydraulics.
- Mohamed Fayad, software engineer and professor known for work in software patterns, object-oriented design, and software stability.
- Mohamed Gad-el-Hak (born 1945), Inez Caudill Eminent Professor of Biomedical Engineering at Virginia Commonwealth University. He is a specialist in fluid mechanics and the author of the standard reference The MEMS Handbook.
- Mohamed Hashish (1947–present), mechanical engineer and inventor. While at Flow International, he invented the abrasive waterjet cutter, a technology now used globally in aerospace and automotive manufacturing.
- Mohamed Noor, geneticist and professor in the Biology Department at Duke University, known for research in evolution, genetics, and genomics.
- Mohammad Fadel, law professor at the University of Toronto Faculty of Law and former Canada Research Chair for the law and economics of Islamic law.
- Mohammed Albakry, academic and translator of contemporary Arabic literature. He is a professor at Middle Tennessee State University, and his translations of Arabic fiction and Egyptian drama have appeared in publications and theater productions in several U.S. cities.
- Mona Diab, computer scientist and director of Carnegie Mellon University's Language Technologies Institute, specializing in natural language processing, computational linguistics, and Arabic language processing.
- Mona N. Fouad, Egyptian-American physician and the inaugural holder of the Edward E. Partridge, M.D., Endowed Chair for Cancer Disparity Research at the University of Alabama at Birmingham. She was elected to the National Academy of Medicine in 2017.
- Mona Zaghloul, Egyptian-American electronics engineer and professor of electrical and computer engineering at George Washington University, known for her work in integrated circuits, neural networks, and MEMS.
- Mootaz Elnozahy, computer scientist and Dean of the Computer, Electrical and Mathematical Sciences and Engineering Division at KAUST. He was previously a senior researcher at IBM and is an expert in systems reliability and low-power computing.
- Mostafa Ammar, computer scientist and Regents' Professor in the School of Computer Science at Georgia Institute of Technology. He is known for pioneering contributions to scalable network and multimedia services, and was elected both an ACM Fellow and an IEEE Fellow for his work in network systems and protocols.
- Mostafa El-Sayed (1933–present), Julius Brown Chair and Regents Professor of Chemistry at Georgia Tech. A recipient of the National Medal of Science, he is a pioneer in nanotechnology and the "El-Sayed Rule" in photochemistry.
- Moustafa Bayoumi, writer, journalist, and professor of English at Brooklyn College. He is known for books such as How Does It Feel to Be a Problem? and This Muslim American Life, which examine Arab and Muslim life in the United States.
- Mourad Ismail, Professor of Mathematics at the University of Central Florida. He is a leading expert in orthogonal polynomials and special functions, having authored a primary text on the subject.
- Moustafa Youssef, computer scientist and professor at Alexandria University with an adjunct position at the University of Maryland. He is an ACM and IEEE Fellow, recognized for his pioneering research in indoor location tracking and mobile sensor networks.
- Muhammad S. Eissa, Egyptian-born author and lecturer of Arabic at the University of Chicago, former Mellon Lecturer at the University of Michigan, and consulting editor for the Middle Eastern Texts Initiative. He has taught Arabic and Islamic studies at institutions including the American University in Cairo, Northwestern University, Brigham Young University, and Colgate University.
- Nabih Youssef (1944–2024), structural engineer and founder of Nabih Youssef & Associates. He was a national leader in seismic engineering, known for translating advanced structural engineering concepts into practical applications, most notably through the use of base isolation in the seismic retrofit of Los Angeles City Hall
- Nagui Achamallah, Psyciatrist, Artist (painter) , born in Alexandria and resides in California.
- Nagwa El-Badri, Professor and Director of the Center of Excellence in Stem Cells and Regenerative Medicine. She was previously a faculty member at the University of South Florida and is a leading researcher in immunology and the application of stem cell technology to treat autoimmune diseases.
- Nazli Choucri, political scientist and professor at MIT whose work centers on international relations, cyberpolitics, and sustainability. She is known for her scholarship on international relations in the cyber age and for creating the Global System for Sustainable Development.
- Nezar AlSayyad (born 1956), Cairo-born architect, planner, and urban historian; Distinguished Professor Emeritus of Architecture, Planning, Urban Design, and Urban History at the University of California, Berkeley, where he chaired the Center for Middle Eastern Studies from 1995 to 2014. He co-founded the International Association for the Study of Traditional Environments (IASTE) and is a Guggenheim Fellow.
- Noha Radwan, scholar of comparative literature at the University of California, Davis whose work focuses on modern Arabic and Middle Eastern literature.
- Peter Attia (born 1973), physician, author, and former researcher known for his work on longevity medicine. He is the author of Outlive: The Science and Art of Longevity and a prominent public advocate for preventive health, metabolic health, and lifespan extension.
- Ragui Assaad, Professor of Planning and Public Affairs at the Humphrey School of Public Affairs (University of Minnesota).
- Ramez Elmasri, Egyptian-American computer scientist and academic known for work in database systems and co-authoring widely used database textbooks.
- Ramez Naam, Egyptian-born American computer scientist, futurist, climate-technology investor, and science fiction writer. A former Microsoft executive who worked on Outlook, Internet Explorer, and Bing, he is known for the Nexus Trilogy and for writing on clean energy, technological innovation, and human enhancement.
- Ramzi Fawaz, professor of English at the University of Wisconsin–Madison and author of The New Mutants: Superheroes and the Radical Imagination of American Comics and Queer Forms.
- Rana el Kaliouby (1978–present), computer scientist and entrepreneur. She is the co-founder and former CEO of Affectiva (an MIT Media Lab spinoff) and is a pioneer in "Emotion AI," developing technology that allows computers to recognize and respond to human emotions.
- Rania Awaad, psychiatrist, Islamic scholar, and Clinical Professor of Psychiatry at Stanford University. She is known for her work on Muslim mental health, Islam and psychology, and Islamically integrated psychotherapy.
- Raymond Schinazi (born 1950), Egyptian-born American medicinal chemist and professor at Emory University. Known for pioneering antiviral drug research, including treatments for HIV and hepatitis C, and for founding several biotechnology companies, including Pharmasset.
- Reda Mankbadi, Professor and former Dean of the College of Engineering and Computing at Embry-Riddle Aeronautical University. He is a specialist in computational aeroacoustics and fluid dynamics, contributing significantly to the development of quieter jet engines.
- Ronald Hamowy (1937–2012), academic and intellectual historian associated with libertarianism; he was professor emeritus of intellectual history at the University of Alberta.
- Rushdi Said (1920–2013), geologist and scholar. He was the former director of the Egyptian Geological Survey and wrote the definitive work The Geology of Egypt, foundational to the country’s natural resource exploration.
- Saad Eddin Ibrahim (1938–present), Professor of Sociology at the American University in Cairo. He is a prominent human rights activist and founder of the Ibn Khaldun Center for Development Studies.
- Saad Z. Nagi, sociologist whose disability framework influenced modern U.S. disability policy, including the Americans with Disabilities Act.
- Sadek Hilal (1936-2000), Columbia University radiologist and one of the most influential researchers in advancing imaging science and radiology in the twentieth century.
- Said Ghabrial (1939–2018), Professor of Plant Pathology at the University of Kentucky. He was a world authority on fungal viruses (mycoviruses) and their role in plant disease management.
- Safa Zaki, Egyptian-born American psychologist and academic administrator who serves as the sixteenth president of Bowdoin College. A cognitive scientist by training, her research focuses on categorization and the computational modeling of cognitive processes
- Sahar Aziz, Distinguished Professor of Law and Chancellor's Social Justice Scholar at Rutgers Law School, where she founded and directs the Center for Security, Race and Rights.
- Samy El-Shall (1953–present), Mary Eugenia Kapp Endowed Professor of Chemistry at Virginia Commonwealth University. His research focuses on nanostructured materials, catalysis, and the study of molecular clusters.
- Sarafina Nance, astrophysicist and science communicator. A doctoral researcher at UC Berkeley, she specializes in supernovae and the expansion of the universe, and is known for her work in public science education.
- Shahinaz Gadalla, physician-scientist and cancer epidemiologist at the National Cancer Institute, where she researches cancer biomarkers, cancer risk, and outcomes after hematopoietic stem cell transplantation.
- Sherief Reda, computer scientist and engineer whose research focuses on energy-efficient computing, electronic design automation, and approximate computing. He is a professor in the School of Engineering at Brown University and has also worked as a principal research scientist at Amazon.
- Sherif Girgis, philosopher and legal scholar. He is a professor of law at the University of Notre Dame with an expertise in criminal law, constitutional law, constitutional theory, the intersection of law and religion, and the philosophy of law.
- Sherif Zaki (1955–2021), pathologist and longtime Centers for Disease Control and Prevention infectious-disease pathology expert whose work included investigations of Ebola, Zika, anthrax, Nipah virus, and COVID-19.
- Sherine E. Gabriel, rheumatologist and administrator. She is the executive vice president of ASU Health at Arizona State University and is the planning dean for the John Shufeldt School of Medicine and Medical Engineering.
- Tahani Amer, aerospace engineer and senior executive at NASA. She has made significant contributions to computational fluid dynamics and thermal protection systems for space vehicles, and was awarded the NASA Exceptional Service Medal.
- Taher Elgamal (1955–present), cryptographer and entrepreneur. Known as the "father of SSL," he led the team at Netscape that developed the SSL protocol, and he is the namesake of the ElGamal discrete log cryptosystem.
- Tarek Abdelzaher, Egyptian-born computer scientist and professor at the University of Illinois Urbana–Champaign known for work on real-time computing, cyber-physical systems, and the Internet of things.
- Tarek El-Bawab, Egyptian-American engineer, academic, and researcher known for his work in telecommunications and network engineering education. He served as editor-in-chief of IEEE Communications Magazine.
- Tarek M. Elgindi, mathematician and a professor of mathematics at Duke University. His research concerns partial differential equations and mathematical fluid dynamics, particularly singularity formation and the long-term behavior of solutions to the incompressible Euler equations.
- Tarek Masoud, political scientist and Ford Foundation Professor of Democracy and Governance at the Harvard Kennedy School. He is a leading scholar of democratization, elections, and political development in the Middle East, and is the author or co-author of works including Counting Islam and The Arab Spring: Pathways of Repression and Reform.
- Tarek Omar Souryal, orthopedic surgeon and sports medicine specialist who served as team doctor for the Dallas Mavericks and president of the NBA Physicians Association.
- Tarek Sobh, Egyptian-American engineer and university president; president of Lawrence Technological University.
- Wafaa El-Sadr (1950–present), University Professor of Epidemiology and Medicine at Columbia University. She is the founder of ICAP, which provides global support for HIV/AIDS and TB treatment, and is a recipient of a MacArthur Fellowship.
- Wafik El-Deiry, Director of the Legorreta Cancer Center at Brown University. He is a world-renowned physician-scientist whose discovery of the p21 gene has been fundamental to understanding how the p53 tumor suppressor gene works.
- Waguih Ishak, Egyptian-Canadian-American engineer, technologist, and academic who was division vice president and chief technologist at Corning Inc. and an adjunct professor of electrical engineering at Stanford University.
- Waleed El-Ansary, scholar of comparative religion, Islam, and Islamic economics, and holder of the El-Swedey Chair in Islamic Studies at Xavier University.
- Yaser Abu-Mostafa, Professor of Electrical Engineering and Computer Science at Caltech. He is a co-founder of the NeurIPS conference and the author of Learning From Data, one of the most widely used textbooks in machine learning.
- Yervant Terzian (1939–2019), Egyptian-born American astronomer and Tisch Distinguished Professor Emeritus at Cornell University, where he chaired the astronomy department for two decades. His research examined stellar evolution, planetary nebulae, and interstellar and intergalactic matter; he received the NASA Distinguished Public Service Medal in 2018.
- Youssef Marzouk, American computational scientist of Egyptian descent and the Breene M. Kerr (1951) Professor of aeronautics and astronautics at the Massachusetts Institute of Technology. An associate dean of the MIT Schwarzman College of Computing and co-director of MIT’s Center for Computational Science and Engineering, his research focuses on uncertainty quantification, Bayesian inference, inverse problems, data assimilation, and machine learning for complex physical systems.
- Zakya Kafafi, distinguished research fellow of the Electrical and Computer Engineering Department at Lehigh University. She was the first woman to be appointed as the National Science Foundation Director of the Division of Materials Research.

== Arts and entertainment ==
- Abubakr Ali, Egyptian-born American actor known for playing Khal in the romantic comedy Anything's Possible (2022), directed by Billy Porter.
- Ahmed Ahmed (1970–present), actor and comedian who co-founded the "Axis of Evil Comedy Tour." He has appeared in films such as Iron Man and Swingers, and directed the documentary Just Like Us, which explores stand-up comedy in the Middle East.
- Aja (born 1994), American rapper, reality television personality, and drag queen known for competing on RuPaul's Drag Race and RuPaul's Drag Race All Stars.
- Alexander D'Arcy, actor with an international film career who often portrayed suave gentlemen and polished rogues.
- Ali Selim (born 1960/1961), film and television director.
- André Hakim (1915–1980), Egyptian-born film producer who worked in Hollywood and produced films including Mr. Belvedere Rings the Bell and The Man Who Understood Women.
- Amr El-Bayoumi actor whose screen credits include work in film and television.
- Asaad Kelada, prolific television director who has helmed hundreds of episodes of classic American sitcoms, including Who's the Boss?, The Facts of Life, and Family Ties. He is a graduate of the Yale School of Drama and a major figure in the history of the multi-camera format.
- Basil Gogos (1929–2017), illustrator best known for his portraits of movie monsters that appeared on the covers of Famous Monsters of Filmland.
- Bobby Chinn, chef, restaurateur, television presenter, and cookbook author known for hosting Discovery TLC's World Cafe and judging Top Chef Middle East.
- C. K. Alexander (1923–1980), Egyptian-born actor, director, composer, and playwright who moved to the United States in the 1940s.
- Chantal Zaky (born 1988), Jamaican-American model and beauty pageant titleholder who was crowned Miss Jamaica Universe 2012.
- Charlotte Wassef (1912–1988), Egyptian beauty queen who was crowned Miss Egypt and Miss Universe 1935 and later lived in the United States.
- Christopher Maher (1955–present), actor known for roles in Men in Black and The 13th Warrior. He transitioned into a highly successful culinary career, becoming a James Beard Foundation Award-recognized chef and owner of a prominent cooking school in New Mexico.
- Deana Haggag, American arts organization leader who served as President and CEO of United States Artists and Program Director for Arts and Culture at the Andrew W. Mellon Foundation.
- Dhimah, Egyptian-born American belly dancer, choreographer, and teacher associated with Middle Eastern dance in the United States.
- Diane Tuckman (1939–present), pioneering silk artist and author. She is the co-founder of Silk Painters International (SPIN) and has been instrumental in popularizing silk painting as a fine art medium through her teaching and publications.
- Dina Amer, film director, writer, producer, and journalist. She is best known for her feature debut You Resemble Me, a drama about identity and radicalization that premiered at the Venice International Film Festival
- Dina Emam, film producer best known for Yomeddine, which premiered at the 2018 Cannes Film Festival and was Egypt's submission for the Academy Award for Best Foreign Language Film at the 2019 Academy Awards. She was named one of Variety's “10 Producers to Watch” in 2018.
- Dina Hashem, stand-up comedian, writer, and actress known for her hour-long special Dark Little Whispers and for her work as a writer on The Daily Show, for which she received two Emmy nominations.
- Dora Khayatt (1912–1986), Egyptian-born painter known for portraits, landscapes, and seascapes.
- Fouad Said, film producer, cinematographer, inventor and investor; inventor of the Cinemobile mobile film-production system and founder of the investment firm Unifund.
- Frank Agrama, director and producer who founded Harmony Gold USA. He is best known for being the creative force behind Robotech, a landmark series that helped popularize Japanese anime for North American audiences.
- Ghada Amer, artist whose work addresses gender and sexuality and is best known for layered embroidered paintings of women's bodies.
- Hadji Ali (c. 1890–1937), vaudeville performer of Egyptian descent known for controlled regurgitation acts including water-spouting and smoke-swallowing.
- Hagop Sandaldjian (1931–1990), Egyptian-born Armenian American musician and microminiature sculptor.
- Hani Rashid (born 1958), Cairo-born architect and educator; co-founder of the New York firm Asymptote Architecture, known for the Yas Hotel Abu Dhabi, 166 Perry Street, and the New York Stock Exchange Advanced Trading Floor. Longtime professor at Columbia University's Graduate School of Architecture, Planning and Preservation; represented the U.S. at the 2000 Venice Architecture Biennale. Brother of designer Karim Rashid.
- Heba Amin, visual artist, researcher, and educator whose work explores politics, technology, and urbanism; she is also known for the subversive graffiti action on the set of Homeland.
- Hesham Issawi, writer and director best known for AmericanEast and Cairo Exit.
- Iman Le Caire, Egyptian-born dancer, actress, choreographer, and LGBTQ activist.
- Jehane Noujaim, Academy Award-nominated documentary director known for The Square, Control Room, and Startup.com. Her work often focuses on social justice and the intersection of media and political revolutions in the Middle East.
- Joe DeRosa (1977–present), stand-up comedian and actor who portrays the character Dr. Caldera on Better Call Saul. He is a frequent guest on comedy podcasts and has released several acclaimed comedy albums.
- Jonathan Roumie (born 1974), American actor known for portraying Jesus in The Chosen and evangelist Lonnie Frisbee in Jesus Revolution.
- Joy Garnett (born 1965), interdisciplinary visual artist and writer whose work explores the social and political implications of images. Her paintings often reference archival photographs and have been exhibited in major museums like the MoMA.
- Kal Naga (born 1976), actor, director, and producer known for his work in Egyptian and international film and television.
- Kareem Rahma, comedian, host, and co-founder of the production company Museum of Modern Art. He is best known as the creator and host of the viral interview series Subway Takes, which has amassed a global following on social media.
- Karim Amer (born 1983), film producer and director known for work on The Square, The Great Hack, and The Vow.
- Karim Rashid (born 1960), Cairo-born industrial designer known for the Umbra "Garbo" wastebasket, the Bobble water bottle, and the Semiramis Hotel in Athens; one of the most prolific designers of his generation, with over 3,000 designs in production and work in the permanent collections of MoMA and the Centre Pompidou.
- Khigh Dhiegh (1916–1991), American television and film actor of Anglo-Egyptian Sudanese ancestry, best known for playing Wo Fat on Hawaii Five-O and Dr. Yen Lo in The Manchurian Candidate.
- Magda Saleh, ballet dancer educated at the Higher Institute of Ballet, the Moscow State Academy of Choreography, the University of Southern California, and New York University.
- Kris Straub (born 1979), American web cartoonist, performer, and content creator known for webcomics such as Checkerboard Nightmare, Starslip, and Chainsawsuit, and for creating the analog horror series Local 58.
- Laila Gohar (born 1988), artist and designer known for food-based installations and the tableware brand Gohar World.
- Layla Taj, belly dancer in the classical Egyptian raqs sharqi style whose repertoire focuses on Egyptian culture.
- May Calamawy, actress who gained international recognition for her roles in the Hulu series Ramy and as Layla El-Faouly (Scarlet Scarab) in the Marvel Cinematic Universe series Moon Knight.
- Mena Massoud (1991–present), actor who played the title role in Disney's live-action Aladdin (2019). He is also an entrepreneur and author of the book Evolving Vegan, which documents his journey as a plant-based food advocate.
- Michael Iskander, actor and singer known for portraying David in the Amazon Prime Video series House of David. He made his Broadway debut as Aaron in the original Broadway cast of Kimberly Akimbo.
- Mona A. El-Bayoumi (born 1962), painter and mixed-media artist.
- Nessa Diab, radio and TV personality known for her long-standing show on Hot 97. She is a prominent activist and host of various MTV programs, including the Girl Code reunion shows and The Challenge reunions.
- Omar Elba, actor best known for co-starring with Tom Hanks in A Hologram for the King and for later television roles including Limetown and Mo
- Omar Metwally (1974–present), actor known for his work in Steven Spielberg’s Munich and his role as Dr. Vik Ullah in The Affair. He is a veteran stage performer and received a Tony Award nomination for his performance in Sixteen Wounded.
- Osgood Perkins (born 1974), American filmmaker and actor known for directing horror films including The Blackcoat's Daughter, Longlegs, and The Monkey.
- Patrick Sabongui, actor, stunt performer and drama teacher known for portraying David Singh in The Flash.
- Peter Shoukry, model and artist.
- Rami Malek (1981–present), Academy Award-winning actor best known for portraying Freddie Mercury in Bohemian Rhapsody and Elliot Alderson in Mr. Robot. He is the first actor of Egyptian heritage to win an Oscar for Best Actor.
- Ramy Romany, Egyptologist, documentarian, TV host and Directors Guild of America (DGA) director.
- Ramy Youssef (1991–present), Golden Globe-winning actor and comedian known for his semi-autobiographical series Ramy. He has also directed episodes for The Bear and appeared in the acclaimed film Poor Things.
- Rita Asfour (1933–2021), painter known for her depictions of ballet dancers and Las Vegas showgirls. Her work was exhibited at the University of Nevada, Las Vegas, and she was the subject of the Vegas PBS documentary Rita Asfour: Art Her Way.
- Ronnie Khalil, stand-up comedian and filmmaker who wrote and directed A Very Merry Muslim Christmas. His work focuses on navigating the cultural nuances of being Egyptian-American through satire and observational humor.
- Sam Abbas (born 1993), film director, screenwriter, and producer known for The Wedding and Alia's Birth.
- Ryan Malaty, actor and television personality known for appearing in the MTV reality series Are You the One? and the comedy series My Dead Ex.
- Salma Hindy, stand-up comedian and actress known for appearances on Roast Battle Canada and voicing Sharia Hussein in #1 Happy Family USA; released the comedy album Born on 9/11 in 2022.
- Sam Esmail (1977–present), screenwriter and director best known as the creator of the Emmy-winning series Mr. Robot. He also directed the series Homecoming and the psychological thriller film Leave the World Behind.
- Sammy Sheik (1981–present), actor recognized for his roles as Mustafa in American Sniper and various characters in Sand Castle and Transformers: Dark of the Moon. He is often sought after for his versatility in action and drama.
- Sarah Farahat, transdisciplinary artist and educator known for creating the We Choose Love mural at a TriMet transit center memorializing the 2017 Portland train attack.
- Sarah Fasha, beauty pageant and youtube personality.
- Sayed Badreya (1957–present), veteran actor whose career spans over three decades with roles in Iron Man, Three Kings, and The Insider. He has been a vocal advocate for more authentic representation of Arabs in Hollywood.
- Shereen Ahmed, actress and singer best known for her Broadway debut in the Lincoln Center Theater revival of My Fair Lady and for portraying Eliza Doolittle on the production’s U.S. national tour.
- Sherin Guirguis, visual artist based in Los Angeles, California. Guirguis has had solo exhibitions of her work at 18th Street Art Center (Santa Monica, California), The Third Line Gallery (Dubai), Shulamit Nazarian Gallery (Venice, California), and LAXART (Los Angeles). In 2012, Guirguis received the California Community Foundation Fellowship for Visual Artists and the 2014–15 City of Los Angeles Individual Artist Fellowship.
- Sonja Kinski, actress and model. She is the daughter of Ibrahim Moussa and has worked in film and fashion.
- Tamer Shaaban (born 1988), American film director, writer, and producer of Egyptian descent.
- Wael Abdelgawad, American novelist, web developer, and martial artist of Egyptian descent whose works include Pieces of a Dream and whose writing has been associated with Muslim fiction.
- Vanessa Lengies, actress, dancer and singer known for playing Roxanne Bojarski in American Dreams, Sugar Motta in Glee and Erica in Turner & Hooch.
- Wendie Malick (1950–present), actress and former model who received two Primetime Emmy Award nominations for her role in Just Shoot Me!. She is of Egyptian paternal descent and has had a prolific career in sitcoms like Hot in Cleveland.
- Yasmine Al Massri, actress and dancer known for her dual roles in the ABC thriller series Quantico. Born to an Egyptian mother, she debuted in the critically acclaimed film Caramel.
- Yasmine K. Kasem (born 1993), interdisciplinary visual artist whose work uses sculpture and performance to explore themes of identity, gender, and heritage within the Arab-American experience.
- Zeeko Zaki (1990–present), actor known for his lead role as Special Agent Omar Adom "OA" Zidan in the CBS series FBI. He is one of the few Arab-American actors to lead a network procedural drama.

== Business ==
- Adel Mahmoud (1941–2018), former President of the Merck & Co. vaccine division. He was a global health leader responsible for the development of several life-saving vaccines, including those for Rotavirus and HPV.
- Ahmass Fakahany, chief executive of the Altamarea Group, an American restaurant company he started in 2008 with Michael White.
- Ahmed Zayat (born 1962), entrepreneur, industrialist, and racehorse owner best known for owning American Pharoah.
- Ali Abdelaziz, mixed martial arts manager, and founder of Dominance MMA Management. Abdelaziz is the former executive vice president and matchmaker for the World Series of Fighting promotion. He is also a former MMA fighter.
- Allen Adham, computer scientist and co-founder of Blizzard Entertainment. He served as the company’s first president and was a key architect behind legendary gaming titles such as World of Warcraft, StarCraft, and Diablo.
- Amr Awadallah, co-founder of Cloudera and former VP at Google.
- Charif Souki (born 1953), energy executive who founded Cheniere Energy, pioneering the liquefied natural gas (LNG) export industry in the United States. He later founded Tellurian Inc.
- Christopher Sarofim (born 1963), American businessman and fund manager, chairman of Fayez Sarofim & Co. and president of Sarofim International Management Company.
- Dina Habib Powell (1973–present), president of Meta Platforms and former government official who served as the U.S. Deputy National Security Advisor for Strategy. She has held high-ranking positions at Goldman Sachs and the U.S. State Department.
- Emil Michael, former Chief Business Officer at Uber, where he played a pivotal role in the company's global expansion. He has also served as a technology advisor to the United States Department of Defense.
- Fadi Chehadé, information technology executive who served as the CEO of ICANN (Internet Corporation for Assigned Names and Numbers). He is a leader in digital governance and founded several technology ventures including RosettaNet.
- Fady Yacoub, co-founder and partner at HOF Capital, which led the consortium that acquired Porsche's stakes in Bugatti Rimac and Rimac Group.
- Fayez Sarofim, legendary fund manager and billionaire founder of Fayez Sarofim & Co. He was a major philanthropist in the Houston area and a part-owner of the Houston Texans of the NFL.
- Fouad Said, film producer, cinematographer, inventor and investor; inventor of the Cinemobile mobile film-production system and founder of the investment firm Unifund.
- Gamal Aziz (also known as Gamal Abdelaziz), businessman and hospitality executive who was president of Wynn Macau, chief operating officer of Wynn Resorts, and former president and COO of MGM Resorts International.
- Hany Rashwan, Egyptian-American technology entrepreneur and co-founder of companies including Amun and 21Shares, focused on cryptocurrency and exchange-traded products.
- Helmy Eltoukhy, electrical engineer and biotech entrepreneur. He is the co-founder and CEO of Guardant Health, a leader in precision oncology and liquid biopsy technology for cancer detection.
- Hisham Elhaddad, co-founder and managing partner of HOF Capital, which led the consortium that acquired Porsche's stakes in Bugatti Rimac and Rimac Group.
- Louis C. Camilleri (born 13 January 1955), former CEO of Ferrari and former chairman of Philip Morris International.
- Michael Mina (1969–present), award-winning chef and restaurateur whose Mina Group operates dozens of high-end restaurants across the United States. He is a Michelin-star recipient.
- Mo Gawdat, former Chief Business Officer of Google X and author of Solve for Happy. He is a prominent speaker and entrepreneur focusing on the intersection of technology and human well-being.
- Mohamed El-Erian (1958–present), economist and former CEO of PIMCO. He currently serves as the President of Queens' College, Cambridge, and Chief Economic Advisor at Allianz, and is a frequent contributor to global economic policy discussions.
- Nabih Youssef (1944–2024), structural engineer and founder of Nabih Youssef & Associates. He was a national leader in seismic engineering, known for translating advanced structural engineering concepts into practical applications, most notably through the use of base isolation in the seismic retrofit of Los Angeles City Hall
- Nabil El Sanadi (c. 1955–2016), Cairo-born emergency physician who immigrated to the United States with his family in the 1960s. He served as chief of emergency medicine at University Hospitals of Cleveland and at Broward Health, chairman of the Florida Board of Medicine, and president and CEO of Broward Health from 2014 until his death.
- Nader Anise, lawyer and marketer based in Florida, best known as the founder and CEO of Nader Anise Lawyer Marketing. He is the founder of the American Lawyers Public Image Association where he currently serves as national director.
- Onsi Sawiris, member of Sawiris Family, co-founder and partner at HOF Capital, which led the consortium that acquired Porsche's stakes in Bugatti Rimac and Rimac Group.
- Peter Mallouk, Kansas based billionaire, founder of Creative Planning, and owner of Sporting Kansas City soccer club.
- Rana el Kaliouby (1978–present), computer scientist and entrepreneur who co-founded Affectiva, a pioneer in the field of Emotion AI. She is currently a general partner at Bluepoint Ventures.
- Razmig Hovaghimian, Egyptian-born American entrepreneur who co-founded the video-streaming service Viki and the nonprofit neonatal-health organization Embrace. He also founded the local-news company Hoodline.
- Roger Tamraz (born 1940), businessman, international banker, and venture capital investor who chairs the petroleum firm NetOil.
- Sadek Wahba (born 1965), economist and businessman who founded I Squared Capital. He is a recognized expert in global infrastructure investment and has served as an advisor to several international financial institutions.
- Sharif El-Gamal (born 1973), American real estate developer and chairman and CEO of Soho Properties, known for his role in the proposed Park51 Islamic community center in Lower Manhattan.
- Teymour Boutros-Ghali, investor and entrepreneur. Former CEO of AllBusiness, Zowie Intertainment and Thrive Online, and co-founder of Monitor Ventures and BOLD Capital Partners. Ghali holds degress from Cambridge University and MIT, including a PhD in plasma physics.
- Will Ahmed, founder and CEO of WHOOP, a wearable technology company specializing in performance and health monitoring. Under his leadership, the company has become a unicorn valued at over $3 billion.

== Literature ==
- Ahmed Zaki Abu Shadi, Romantic poet, publisher, physician, bacteriologist, and bee scientist associated with neo-romanticism and the Apollo Society.
- Alicia Erian (born 1967), novelist of Egyptian descent whose works include The Brutal Language of Love and Towelhead.
- André Aciman (born 1951), Alexandria-born writer and scholar. He is best known for his novel Call Me by Your Name, which was adapted into an Oscar-winning film, and his memoir Out of Egypt, detailing his family's history.
- Carole Naggar, poet and photography historian. She has published numerous biographies of legendary photographers and served as a curator for major exhibitions worldwide, focusing on the history of photojournalism.
- Hala Halim, academic and translator who has written on literature and culture and teaches in the Middle Eastern and Islamic Studies department at New York University.
- Huda Fahmy (born c. 1985), American graphic novelist whose book Huda F Cares? was a finalist for the National Book Award for Young People's Literature.
- Kareem James Abu-Zeid, Egyptian-American translator, editor, and writer known for translating contemporary Arabic poetry and literature into English.
- Lucette Lagnado (1956–2019), journalist for The Wall Street Journal and author of The Man in the White Sharkskin Suit, a memoir about her family’s departure from Egypt and their new life in America.
- Marty Makary, surgical oncologist at Johns Hopkins and a New York Times bestselling author. His books, including The Price We Pay, focus on health care reform and the economics of the American medical system.
- Pauls Toutonghi (born 1976), first-generation American fiction and non-fiction writer, author of Red Weather, Evel Knievel Days, and Dog Gone.
- Rachel Wahba (born 1946), American writer, activist, and psychotherapist whose work focuses on Mizrahi and Sephardic Jewish identity, including the experiences of Jews from Egypt and Iraq.
- Randa Jarrar, writer, translator, and novelist whose work includes fiction, essays, and memoir. Her writing often engages questions of identity, migration, and Arab-American life.
- Sabah Khodir (born c. 1991), Egyptian-American poet and activist.
- Saladin Ahmed, Eisner Award-winning comic book writer and fantasy author. He is known for the novel Throne of the Crescent Moon and has written major titles for Marvel Comics, including Black Bolt and Spider-Man (Miles Morales).
- Sharifa Yazmeen, playwright and theatre director. Two of her plays have been featured in The Methuen Drama Book of Trans Plays, and she was the inaugural winner of the Barbara Whitman Award.
- Stephen Adly Guirgis, Pulitzer Prize-winning playwright known for his gritty, urban dramas. His works include Between Riverside and Crazy, The Motherfucker with the Hat, and Our Lady of 121st Street.
- Victor Hassine (1956–2008), attorney and author who wrote extensively about prison reform while incarcerated. His memoir, Life Without Parole, is widely used in criminology and sociology courses.
- Yasmin Mogahed (born 1980), author, educator and Muslim speaker.
- Yussef El Guindi (1960–present), playwright whose works, such as Back of the Throat and Pilgrims Musa and Sheri in the New World, examine the Arab-American experience and civil liberties in a post-9/11 world.

== Media and journalism ==
- Ayman Mohyeldin, prominent journalist and anchor for NBC News and MSNBC. He is widely recognized for his on-the-ground reporting during major Middle Eastern conflicts and his role as host of Ayman.
- Bassem Youssef, cardiologist-turned-satirist known as "The Jon Stewart of the Arab World" for his hit show Al-Bernameg. He has since relocated to the U.S., where he works as a comedian and political commentator.
- Claude Salhani (1952–2022), Cairo-born Lebanese, French, and American photographer, photojournalist, editor, and author who worked for United Press International and Reuters.
- George Noory (born 1950), radio talk show host and longtime weekday host of Coast to Coast AM.
- Hannah Allam (born 1977), journalist and reporter who has covered the Middle East and national security for The Washington Post, NPR, BuzzFeed News, and McClatchy.
- Hoda Kotb (1964–present), television host and news anchor who serves as the co-anchor of the NBC News morning show Today. She is a New York Times bestselling author and one of the most recognizable faces in American broadcast journalism.
- Kassem G (born 1983), Internet personality and host of Attack of the Show!, known for the YouTube web series California On, Going Deep, and Street Music.
- Maryam Henein, Canadian-born American activist, filmmaker, journalist, alternative medicine practitioner, and entrepreneur, known for directing the documentary Vanishing of the Bees.
- Maryana Iskander, social entrepreneur and lawyer who serves as the CEO of the Wikimedia Foundation. She previously led the Harambee Youth Employment Accelerator and is a recipient of the Skoll Award for Social Entrepreneurship.
- Meena Dimian (born 1981), broadcaster, writer, actor, and international television personality.
- Mohammed Elshamy (born 1994), photojournalist based in Lagos and New York.
- Mona Eltahawy (1967–present), independent journalist and activist known for her outspoken advocacy for women's rights in the Arab world. She is the author of Headscarves and Hymens: Why the Middle East Needs a Sexual Revolution.
- Nancy Youssef, award-winning national security correspondent for The Wall Street Journal. She is known for her extensive experience reporting from conflict zones and her deep expertise in U.S. military and intelligence operations.
- Omar El Akkad, novelist and journalist. Best known for his critically acclaimed novels American War and What Strange Paradise (which won the 2021 Scotiabank Giller Prize), his writing often explores the human impacts of war, displacement, and climate change.
- Rawya Rageh, journalist and correspondent who has reported for international news organizations including Al Jazeera English.
- Shadi Hamid (born 1983), author and political scientist who has written extensively on political Islam and democracy in the Middle East.

== Music ==
- Aly Tadros, singer-songwriter known for a self-taught finger-picking style and for blending folk, pop, Mexican, and Middle Eastern influences in her music.
- Amira Elfeky, American singer and songwriter.
- Diamanda Galás (born 1955), American musician, singer-songwriter, visual artist, and activist known for her experimental vocal work and performances as a composer, pianist, organist, and performance artist.
- Halim El-Dabh, composer and performer who was an early pioneer of electronic music. He created one of the first known works of tape music in 1944 and served as a professor of ethnomusicology for several decades.
- Kareem Salama, country music singer-songwriter whose music blends American country roots with Middle Eastern influences. He has toured globally and is known for songs that promote cross-cultural understanding.
- Lara Scandar (born 1990), Egyptian-Lebanese singer and songwriter who rose to fame after competing on the Pan-Arab talent show Star Academy.
- Mohammed Fairouz, composer known for operas, symphonies, chamber music, and vocal works. He has been described as one of the most frequently performed composers of his generation, and his music often engages Arab and American literary and political themes
- Nader Sadek, conceptual artist and musician known for his eponymous death metal project and for creating stage imagery for Mayhem. His debut album, In the Flesh (2011), featured musicians including Steve Tucker, Rune Eriksen, and Flo Mounier.
- Nadine El Roubi, Sudanese-born rapper and singer of Egyptian descent, raised partly in Fairfax, Virginia, whose music blends hip-hop and neo-soul.
- Nomi Abadi, American composer, actress, lyricist, pianist, vocalist, and activist known for her work on Marvel's Thunderbolts*.
- Omar Fadel, composer for film, television, and video games, and a multi-instrumentalist whose credits include Assassin's Creed IV: Black Flag, The Dictator, and Day One.
- Osama Afifi, American jazz bassist who has performed and recorded with artists including Yanni, Vanessa Paradis, Kurt Elling, and Nnenna Freelon.
- Raef Haggag (1982–present), acoustic singer-songwriter known for his modern interpretations of traditional Islamic songs and his focus on faith and social identity.
- Raoul Poliakin, (1917–1981) arranger and conductor of popular orchestral music. He appeared on countless albums, including those of Frank Sinatra, Perry Como, Bing Crosby, Dean Martin, Sarah Vaughan, Peggy Lee, Artie Shaw, Tommy Dorsey, Antonio Carlos Jobim and Wes Montgomery.
- Raymond Ibrahim (born 1973), writer, author, translator, and columnist focused on Arabic history, language, and Middle Eastern current affairs. He previously worked as an Arabic-language specialist at the Library of Congress and has published books including Sword and Scimitar and The Al Qaeda Reader.
- Sylvain Sylvain, legendary rock guitarist and founding member of the New York Dolls. He was a key figure in the development of the punk and glam rock movements in New York City during the 1970s.
- Zeina, pop and R&B singer who performs in English, French and Arabic; known for the single "Hooked" and debut album Eastend Confessions (2024); received two Juno Award nominations in 2025.

== Politics ==
- Abdul El-Sayed, physician, public-health official, and politician. He served in senior health roles in Detroit and Wayne County, Michigan, ran for governor of Michigan in 2018, and launched a U.S. Senate campaign in 2026.
- Allan Mansoor, Republican politician who served as a member of the California State Assembly and as the Mayor of Costa Mesa. He is a former Orange County sheriff's deputy.
- Amir Hatem Mahdy Ali, (born 1985) American lawyer and academic who is a United States district judge of the United States District Court for the District of Columbia.
- Amr Hamzawy, Egyptian political scientist, public intellectual, and former member of the Egyptian parliament who has held academic and policy positions in the United States.
- Andrew S. Boutros, American lawyer, law professor, former federal prosecutor, and United States Attorney for the Northern District of Illinois.
- Aya Hijazi (born 1987), social activist and co-founder of the Belady Foundation.
- Bassem Youssef, FBI agent. He was the highest ranking American agent of Middle Eastern and North African descent ever employed by the Federal Bureau of Investigation as of 2009, as a Unit Chief in the FBI Counterterrorism Division. Prior to holding this position, Youssef coordinated the national counterterrorism investigation into the Islamic Group, the organization responsible for the first World Trade Center bombing.
- Dalia Mogahed (1974–present), researcher and scholar who served as an advisor to President Barack Obama on the Advisory Council on Faith-Based and Neighborhood Partnerships. She is the Director of Research at the Institute for Social Policy and Understanding.
- Dina Habib Powell (1973–present), president of Meta Platforms and former government official who served as the U.S. Deputy National Security Advisor for Strategy. She has held high-ranking positions at Goldman Sachs and the U.S. State Department.
- Gamal Helal (1954–present), senior diplomatic interpreter who served four U.S. presidents. He was a key figure in numerous high-stakes Middle East peace negotiations and summits.
- George Helmy, politician who served as a U.S. Senator from New Jersey, filling the seat vacated by Bob Menendez. He previously served as Chief of Staff to New Jersey Governor Phil Murphy.
- Ismael Ahmed (1947–2026), government official, labor leader, and community organizer who co-founded ACCESS and later served as director of the Michigan Department of Human Services. He was also appointed to the National Council on the Arts in the Biden administration.
- Joseph Ghougassian, Egyptian-born American diplomat and academic who served as United States Ambassador to Qatar from 1985 to 1989. He previously directed the Peace Corps program in North Yemen and taught philosophy at the University of San Diego.
- Mary-Katherine Stone, Democratic politician and member of the Vermont House of Representatives. She has focused her legislative work on healthcare access and environmental sustainability.
- Mo Elleithee (born 1972), American Democratic political campaign strategist.
- Nancy Okail, democracy advocate, policy analyst, and human-rights activist who has led organizations focused on civil society and democratic governance.
- Nazli Sabri, the first queen consort in the Kingdom of Egypt from 1919 to 1936, and the second wife of King Fuad I.
- Rana Abdelhamid (born 1993), American political candidate, activist, and community organizer based in Queens, New York; founder of Hijabis of New York and Malikah.
- Sade Elhawary, educator, community organizer, and member of the California State Assembly representing the 57th district. Born and raised in Los Angeles, she is the daughter of Egyptian and Guatemalan immigrants.
- Shereef Elnahal, physician and health official who served as commissioner of the New Jersey Department of Health, president and CEO of University Hospital in Newark, and later U.S. Under Secretary of Veterans Affairs for Health.
- Sherrie Mikhail Miday (born 1976), American judge on the Cuyahoga County Court of Common Pleas and the first Egyptian-American elected judge in the United States.
- Troy Eid (born 1963), American attorney who served as United States Attorney for the District of Colorado from 2006 to 2009.
- Wael Ghonim, pro-democracy leader of the Tahrir Square demonstrations in Egypt. He was one of two administrators of the Facebook page "We are all Khaled Said", which helped spark the Egyptian Revolution of 2011.

== Sports ==
- Abdel Nader (1993–present), professional basketball player who has played for the Phoenix Suns, Oklahoma City Thunder, and Boston Celtics. He was the 2017 NBA G League Rookie of the Year.
- Abdellatif Aboukoura (born 2004), American professional soccer player who plays for Loudoun United FC in the USL Championship.
- Ahmed Hassanein (born 2002), professional American football defensive end for the Detroit Lions of the National Football League. He played college football for the Boise State Broncos, was selected by Detroit in the sixth round of the 2025 NFL draft, and became the first player of Egyptian heritage ever selected in the NFL draft.
- Ahmed Hussein (born 1983), Egyptian former swimmer specializing in backstroke events, two-time Olympian, and three-time All-American swimmer at Arizona State University.
- Alaa Abdelnaby (1968–present), professional basketball player who played five seasons in the NBA before becoming a popular color commentator and analyst.
- Ahmed Elbiali (born October 1, 1990), professional boxer. He is managed by Al Haymon.
- Ahmed Elmaghraby, Olympic field hockey player who represented the United States in international competition, helping to promote the sport within the U.S.
- Amanda Sobhy, professional squash player who reached a career-high world ranking of No. 3. She is the highest-ranked American squash player in history and a multiple-time Pan American Games gold medalist.
- Amir Khillah (1979–present), mixed martial artist and Brazilian Jiu-Jitsu instructor. He has competed in various professional promotions and is a respected figure in the grappling community.
- Amr Aly, retired professional soccer player who won the Hermann Trophy in 1984 as the top college player in the U.S. He earned 11 caps for the U.S. National Team.
- Amro Tarek (born 1992), professional footballer born in the United States who has represented the Egypt national football team.
- Amro El Geziry, modern pentathlete and United States Army athlete who represented Egypt at the 2008, 2012, and 2016 Summer Olympics before competing for the United States at the 2020 Summer Olympics.
- Ehab Amin professional basketball player for Al Ahly, who played college basketball for the Oregon Ducks.
- Farid Simaika (1907–1943), Egyptian diver who competed for Egypt at the 1928 Summer Olympics, winning silver in the 10 metre platform and bronze in the 3 metre springboard, and later became a U.S. citizen and Army Air Forces officer.
- Farida Osman (1995–present), world-record-holding swimmer and three-time Olympian. She is a World Championship bronze medalist and the fastest female swimmer in Egypt and Africa.
- Hesham Ismail (born 1969), American former professional football offensive lineman who played for the Florida Gators and was selected by the Pittsburgh Steelers in the 1992 NFL draft.
- Jamil El Reedy (born 1965), Egyptian alpine skier who represented Egypt at the 1984 Winter Olympics, becoming the first athlete to represent Egypt at the Winter Olympics.
- Maher Hamza fencing coach who was born in Cairo, Egypt. He coached at Texas A&M, Rice University, for US national teams, and for the Egyptian Olympic team.
- Mahmoud Fawzy, also known as Mahmoud Sebie, Greco-Roman wrestler and professional mixed martial artist. He represented Egypt at the 2016 Summer Olympics and later represented the United States, reaching the final at the 2024 Pan American Wrestling Championships.
- Mark Seif (1967–present), professional poker player who has won two World Series of Poker (WSOP) bracelets. He is also an attorney and former television commentator for poker broadcasts.
- Mohamed Aly (1975–present), boxer who won a silver medal in the Super Heavyweight division at the 2004 Summer Olympics. He represented Egypt before relocating to the United States.
- Mohamed Hamza (born 2000), Egyptian foil fencer, Olympian, and Princeton graduate who represented Egypt at the 2016, 2020, and 2024 Summer Olympics.
- Nayel Nassar (born 1991), professional show jumping rider who has competed in FEI World Cup finals and the World Equestrian Games.
- Nazih Deif, Egyptian fencer who competed internationally and later emigrated to the United States.
- Nedya Sawan (born 2002), footballer born in the United States who plays as a forward for the Egypt women's national football team.
- Omar Samhan (1988–present), professional basketball player who was a standout star at Saint Mary's College, leading them to the Sweet 16 in the NCAA Tournament before a career in international professional leagues.
- Reem Moussa (born 1994), basketball player who played college basketball at Rice University and has represented Egypt internationally.
- Sabrina Sobhy, professional squash player who represents the United States. A Harvard University standout, she reached a career-high world ranking of No. 13 and has won multiple U.S. and Pan American titles
- Sam Khalifa (1963–present), former Major League Baseball player for the Pittsburgh Pirates. He was the first person of Egyptian descent to play in the Major Leagues.
- Samia Adam (born 1996), Egyptian footballer who plays as a midfielder for FC Dornbirn and the Egypt women's national football team.
- Shady Omar (born 1997), Egyptian-American professional soccer player who plays as a forward.
- Sherif Farrag, foil fencer who represented Egypt in the men's team foil event at the 2012 Summer Olympics, having previously competed for the United States in World Cup competition. He was a two-time captain of the Columbia Lions fencing team.
- Tarek Morad, professional soccer player who has played for several clubs in the United Soccer League (USL), primarily as a center-back.
- Tia Sobhy (born 2003), Egyptian rhythmic gymnast and multiple gold medalist at the African Rhythmic Gymnastics Championships.

== Other ==
- Ahmed Ibrahim, iconic New York City taxi driver known as the "Cupid Cabbie" for his efforts in matchmaking and providing relationship advice to his passengers.
- Feisal Abdul Rauf (1948–present), Sufi imam and author who gained national prominence for his role in the Cordoba House (Park51) project in lower Manhattan.
- Jacqueline Isaac, Coptic Egyptian attorney and human rights activist focused on the rights of women and minorities in the Middle East.
- Karine Bakhoum, highly influential culinary publicist and consultant known as "The Iron Palate." She is a frequent judge on the Food Network's Iron Chef America.
- Michael Mina (1969–present), award-winning chef and restaurateur whose Mina Group operates dozens of high-end restaurants across the United States. He is a Michelin-star recipient.
- Michael Youssef (born 1948), evangelical pastor and founder of the Church of the Apostles in Atlanta, Georgia, and the international media ministry Leading the Way.
- Shereef Akeel (1965–present), prominent civil rights lawyer who led major lawsuits on behalf of victims of abuse at the Abu Ghraib prison in Iraq.
- Tawfik Hamid (born 1961), Muslim reformer, medical doctor, and author of Inside Jihad.
- Adam Shoemaker, Episcopal clergyman.
