= Tarek Elgindi =

American mathematician

- Education: University of Wisconsin–Madison; New York University (PhD)
- Known for: Singularity formation in the incompressible Euler equations
- Awards: Sloan Research Fellowship (2020); Frontiers of Science Award (2024); Guggenheim Fellowship (2026)
- Scientific career
- Fields: Mathematical analysis Partial differential equations Mathematical fluid dynamics
- Workplaces: Duke University; University of California, San Diego; Princeton University
- Doctoral advisor: Nader Masmoudi; Fang-Hua Lin
- Website: sites.google.com/view/tarekelgindi/home

Tarek M. Elgindi is an Egyptian-American mathematician and a professor of mathematics at Duke University. His research concerns partial differential equations and mathematical fluid dynamics, particularly singularity formation and the long-term behavior of solutions to the incompressible Euler equations.

Elgindi established finite-time singularity formation in three-dimensional incompressible Euler flows without a physical boundary. His construction concerns initial velocity fields in the regularity class $C^{1,\alpha}$, rather than infinitely differentiable initial data. His analytical methods were subsequently adapted by Jiajie Chen and Thomas Y. Hou in further proofs of singularity formation for the Euler and Boussinesq equations. He received a Sloan Research Fellowship in 2020 and a Guggenheim Fellowship in 2026.

== Education and academic career ==
Elgindi studied mathematics at the University of Wisconsin–Madison, where he received a Goldwater Scholarship in 2008. He earned his doctorate at New York University in 2014, supervised by Nader Masmoudi and Fang-Hua Lin.

He was an instructor at Princeton University from 2014 to 2017 and an assistant professor at the University of California, San Diego from 2017 to 2020. He joined Duke University in 2020, and was appointed professor of mathematics in 2024.

== Research ==
=== Singularity formation ===
Elgindi's work on the incompressible Euler equations examines whether initially regular fluid motion can develop a singularity in finite time. The equations describe an idealized fluid with no viscosity and constant density; a singularity can involve unbounded growth of vorticity, which measures local rotation within the fluid.

In work first circulated in 2019 and published in 2021, Elgindi constructed solutions on three-dimensional Euclidean space, $\mathbb{R}^3$, that develop finite-time singularities. The result demonstrated that short-time existence and uniqueness, known in the relevant regularity class since the 1920s, do not imply that solutions remain regular indefinitely. The construction uses axisymmetric flows without swirl: flows that are rotationally symmetric but have no velocity component around their symmetry axis. Their initial velocities belong to $C^{1,\alpha}$ for sufficiently small positive $\alpha$, meaning that their first derivatives satisfy a Hölder continuity condition. The proof constructs self-similar solutions of a simpler model and uses their stability to obtain singular solutions of the Euler equations.

With Tej-Eddine Ghoul and Nader Masmoudi, Elgindi subsequently studied the stability of the blowup construction. They established the existence of finite-energy solutions with $C^{1,\alpha}$ initial velocity that become singular in a locally self-similar manner.

== Honors and recognition ==
- Elgindi received a Sloan Research Fellowship in 2020.
- In 2024, he received a Frontiers of Science Award in mathematics from the International Congress of Basic Science for his work on finite-time singularity formation in the incompressible Euler equations.
- He was awarded a Guggenheim Fellowship in 2026.
