= François M. Abboud =

American cardiologist and researcher (born 1931)

- Born: François M. Abboud; January 5, 1931 (age 95); Cairo, Egypt
- Education: Ain Shams University (MBBCh)
- Occupations: Researcher, academic administrator
- Medical career
- Profession: Physician, researcher
- Field: Cardiology
- Institutions: University of Iowa

François Abboud (born January 5, 1931) is an Egyptian-American cardiologist, medical researcher, and academic administrator who is professor emeritus of internal and cardiovascular medicine at Carver College of Medicine at the University of Iowa.

== Early life and education ==
Abboud was born in Cairo and earned a bachelor's degree in medicine from Ain Shams University. He moved to the U.S. in 1955, where he completed a residency in internal medicine and a fellowship in cardiology at Milwaukee County General Hospital; during his residency, he was affiliated with Marquette University.

== Medical career ==
Abboud joined the medical faculty of the University of Iowa in 1960, and was appointed to direct the Division of Cardiovascular Diseases in 1970; he would continue to lead the division until 1976. In 1974, he established the University of Iowa Cardiovascular Research Center, which he directed until 2012. From 1976 to 2002, Abboud was director of the Department of Internal Medicine.

From 1971, Abboud served as the principal investigator of "Integrative Neurobiology of Cardiovascular Regulation", a National Institutes of Health Program Project Grant. Between 1990 and 1991, Abboud was president of the American Heart Association.

== Awards and honors ==
In 1997, Abboud was elected to the American Academy of Arts and Sciences; he received the American College of Cardiology Distinguished Scientist Award in 2004. He received the American Heart Association Distinguished Scientist Award in 2007. In 2013, the Iowa Board of Regents named the University of Iowa Cardiovascular Research Center after Abboud, citing his role in developing biomedical research at the university.
