= Mostafa Ammar =

Computer scientist and academic

- Known for: Scalable network and multimedia services
- Title: Regents' Professor
- Awards: ACM Fellow (2003); IEEE Fellow (2002); Academia Europaea member (2020)

Academic background
- Education: Massachusetts Institute of Technology (SB 1978, SM 1980); University of Waterloo (PhD 1985)

Mostafa Ammar is an Egyptian-American computer scientist and academic at the Georgia Institute of Technology, where he is a Regents' Professor in the School of Computer Science and has served as interim chair of the school. He is known for contributions to the design of scalable network services and scalable multimedia services and their network support, for which he was elected a Fellow of the Association for Computing Machinery (ACM) in 2003 and a Fellow of the Institute of Electrical and Electronics Engineers (IEEE) in 2002.

== Education and career ==
Ammar received S.B. and S.M. degrees from the Massachusetts Institute of Technology and a Ph.D. from the University of Waterloo. At Georgia Tech, he served as associate chair of the School of Computer Science from 2006 to 2012 and as interim chair from 2019 to 2020; in 2024 he was appointed interim chair for a second time. He also served as editor-in-chief of the IEEE/ACM Transactions on Networking from 1999 to 2003.

== Research ==
Ammar's research has focused on network architectures, protocols, and services, including multicast communication, multimedia streaming, content distribution networks, network simulation, disruption-tolerant networking, mobile cloud computing, and network virtualization. His published work includes studies on message ferrying in sparse mobile ad hoc networks and on prefix-preserving IP address anonymization. He also co-authored the textbook Fundamentals of Telecommunication Networks.

== Honors and recognition ==
Ammar was elected an ACM Fellow in 2003, for contributions to the design of systems and protocols for scalable network service". He was elected an IEEE Fellow in 2002 for contributions to the design of scalable multimedia services and their network support. He is also a member of Academia Europaea. In 2012, a paper co-authored by Ammar won the best paper award at ACM MobiHoc. In 2018, he received the University of Waterloo Faculty of Engineering's Alumni Achievement Medal for Academic Excellence.

== Selected publications ==
- Fundamentals of Telecommunication Networks (with Tarek N. Saadawi and Ahmed El Hakeem, 1994)
- A Message Ferrying Approach for Data Delivery in Sparse Mobile Ad Hoc Networks (2004)
- Prefix-preserving IP address anonymization (2004)
