= Ali S. Hadi =

Egyptian professor

Ali S. Hadi is an Egyptian-American emeritus professor at Cornell University, USA. He was a former vice provost and director of graduate studies and research at American University, Cairo. He is the chairman and the founder of the Actuarial Science Program at the American University in Cairo. He is an elected member of the International Statistical Institute, the American Statistical Association and African Academy of Sciences.

== Early life and education ==
Ali Hadi was born in Saft El-Nour, Egypt. His father died when he was two months old and he spent his formative years with his illiterate and dedicated mother who passionately wanted him to be educated. In 1972, he obtained his first degree in Accounting from Ain Shams University (Cairo, Egypt). In 1975, he left for the U.S. at his own expenses and obtained his MSc degree in Statistics at New York University in 1980. In 1982 and 1984, he obtained M.phil and PhD from the same university.

== Career ==
Ali Hadi worked as a customs officer at Cairo International Airport after his graduation in 1972 till his departure to USA in 1975. In USA, Hadi supported his study and his family by taking up a job in a restaurant where he started as a dishwasher and eventually became the head chef in a journey of eight years. He specialised in French-Continental cuisine. His first academic job came in 1980 when he became a research assistant in New York University after his MSc programme. In 1983, he became an instructor in the same institution. He moved to Cornell University in 1984 to become an assistant Professor. He became an associate professor in 1990, a professor in 1996 and an Emeritus Professor in 2002.

== Awards and memberships ==
In 1972, he won Dr. Abou Bakr Hussien Award for the top ranking undergraduate student in Statistics, Ain Shams University During his MPhil programme, he won the Institute of Management Sciences, Metropolitan New York Chapter's Outstanding Achievements Award in 1983. In 1984, he completed his PhD with distinction and was awarded the Herman E. Krooss Award. In 1991, he was elected as an honorary member of the Golden Key National Honors Society. In 1997, he won the Schering-Plough Award for dedicated Teaching, School of Industrial and labor Relations in Cornell University. In the same year, he was elected as a Fellow of the American Statistical Association. A year later, he was Elected as a Member of the International Statistical Institute and he was named one of the Stephen H. Weiss Presidential Fellow of Cornell University. In 2007, he received the Excellence in Research and Creative Endeavor Award by the American University, Cairo and went ahead to receive the President's Distinguished Service Award by the same institution three years later. In 2011, he was elected as the President of the Islamic Countries Society of Statistical Sciences (ISOSS) and in 2018 he was elected as a Member of the Egyptian National Committee for Mathematics, Academy of Scientific Research & Technology. In 2019, he was elected as a member of African Academy of Sciences.
