= Mohamed Fayad =

Egyptian computer scientist

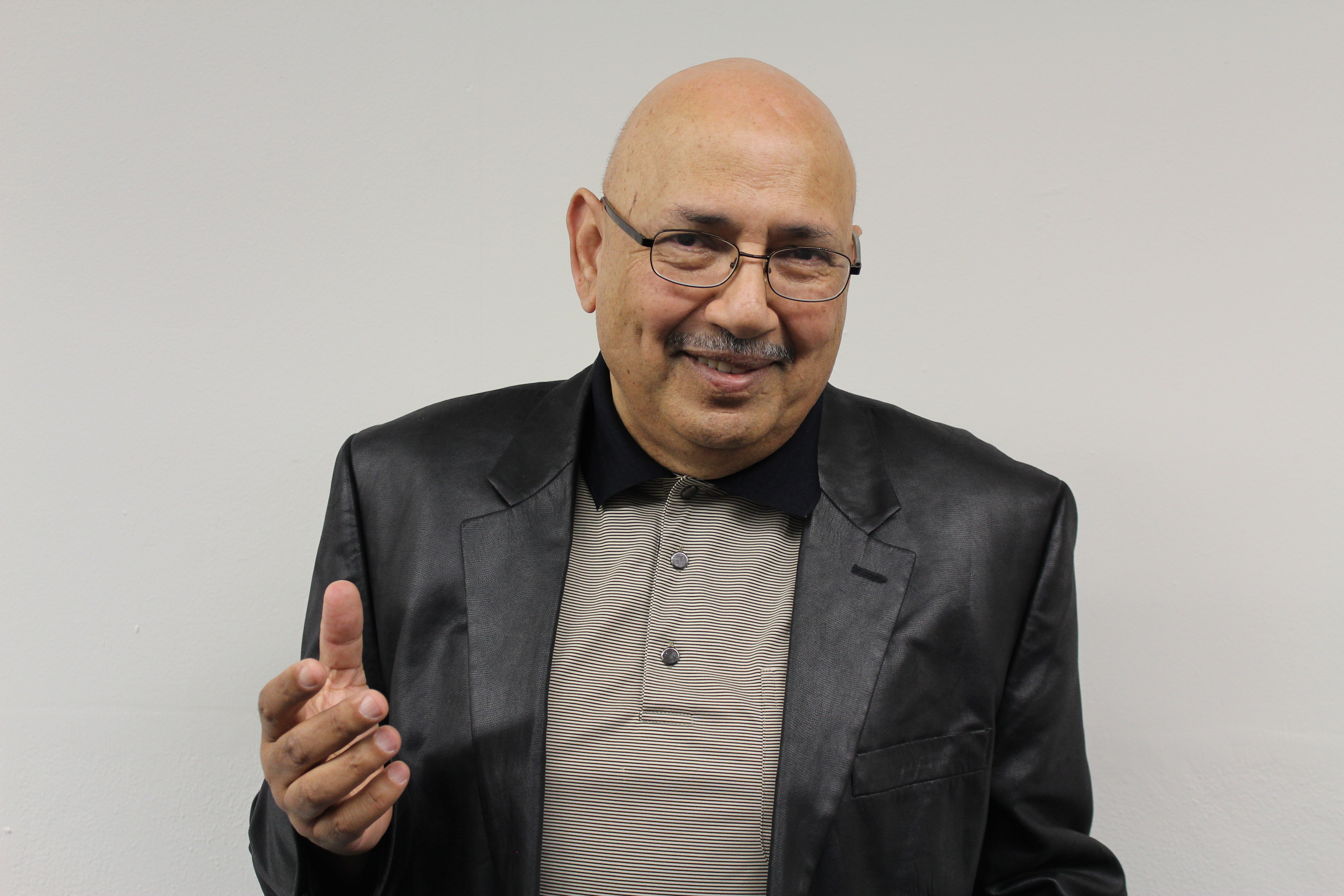
- Born: September 25, 1950 (age 76); El Senbellawein, Dakahlia Governorate, Egypt
- Education: University of Minnesota, Minneapolis (PhD, 1994) (M.S., 1993) (B.Sc., 1972)
- Occupations: Full Professor, author, writer, CEO
- Employer: San Jose State University
- Website: www.engr.sjsu.edu/fayad Fayad Research Group; 130.65.159.53/fayadresearchgroup/

Mohamed Fayad was an Egyptian-American professor of Computer Engineering at San Jose State University, and author of many publications in the area of software engineering.

== Biography ==
=== Early life and education ===
Fayad received his bachelor's degree in Agriculture Engineering from Cairo University, Cairo, Egypt. He received his Master's and Ph.D. in computer science from the University of Minnesota in Minneapolis, where his research focused on Object-Oriented Software Engineering: Problems & Perspectives. He lives in Santa Clara, California.

=== Career ===
Dr. M.E. Fayad has been a full professor of computer engineering at San Jose State University since 2002. Previously, he was a J.D. Edwards professor of Software Engineering in the Department of Computer Science & Engineering at the University of Nebraska, Lincoln, from 1999 to 2002. Between 1995 and 1999, he was an associate professor of computer science and a faculty member of computer engineering at the University of Nevada. He has more than 15 years of industrial experience, including 10 years as a software architect at companies such as McDonnell Douglas and Philips Research Laboratory. His reputation has grown by his achievements in the industry—he has been an IEEE distinguished speaker, an associate editor, editorial advisor, a columnist for The Communications of the ACM (his column is Thinking Objectively), a columnist for Al-Ahram Egyptians Newspaper (2 million subscribers), an editor-in-chief for IEEE Computer Society Press—Computer Science and Engineering Practice Press (1995–1997), a general chair of IEEE/Arab Computer Society International Conference on Computer Systems and Applications (AICCSA 2001), Beirut, Lebanon, June 26–29, 2001, and the founder and president of Arab Computer Society (ACS) from April 2004 to April 2007. Dr. Fayad is a well-known and recognized authority in the domain of theory and the applications of Software Engineering, Linguistic Engineering, and Art of Abstraction. Fayad's publications are in the very core, archival journals and conferences in the field of software engineering. Dr. Fayad was a guest editor on 11 theme issues: CACM's OO Experiences, October 1995, IEEE Computer's Managing OO Software Development Projects, September 1996, CACM's Software Patterns, October 1996, CACM's OO Application Frameworks, October 1997, ACM Computing Surveys—OO Application Frameworks, March 2000, IEEE Software—Software Engineering in-the-small, September/October 2000, and International Journal on Software Practice and Experiences, July 2001, IEEE Transaction on Robotics and Automation—Object-Oriented Methods for Distributed Control Architecture, October 2002, Annals of Software Engineering Journal—OO Web-Based Software Engineering, October 2002, Journal of Systems and Software, Elsevier, Software Architectures and Mobility, July 2010, Pattern Languages: Addressing the Challenges, the Journal of Software, Practice and Experience, March–April 2012, and Critical Look at Agile and Unified Machine Learning in progress. Dr. Fayad has published more than 300 high-quality articles, which include profound and well-cited reports (more than 50 in number) in reputed journals, and over 100 advanced articles in refereed conferences, more than 25 well-received and cited journal columns, 16 blogged columns, 11 well-cited theme issues in prestigious journals and flagship magazines, 24 different workshops in very respected conferences, over 125 tutorials, seminars, and short presentations in more than 25 States in USA since 1978 and 35 different countries, such as, Hong Kong (April 1996), Canada (12 times), Bahrain (2 times), Saudi Arabia (4 times), Egypt (25 times), Lebanon (2), UAE (2 times), Qatar (2 times), Portugal (October 1996, July 1999), Finland (2 times), UK (3 times), Holland (3 times), Germany (4 times), Mexico (October 1998), Argentina (3 times), Chile (2000), Peru (2002), Spain (2002), Brazil (2004), China (4), Morocco (March 2017), and Poland (April 2017), India (3), Vietnam (April 2017), Malaysia (June 2019). He is the founder of 7 new online journals, NASA Red Team Review of QRAS and NSF-USA Research Delegations’ Workshops to Argentina and Chile, Expert witness for Alcatel for major cases between Alcatel (Won) and Cisco 2000-2002 and patent infringement matter—iRobot Corporation v. Hoover, Inc., and more than ten authoritative books, of which 3 of them are translated into different languages such as Chinese and over 8 books currently in progress. Dr. Fayad is also filling for 8 new, valuable, and innovative patents and has developed over 800 stable software patterns and brought a breakthrough in software engineering field. Dr. Fayad earned an MS and a PhD in computer science and Engineering from the University of Minnesota at Minneapolis. His research topic was OO Software Engineering: Problems and Perspectives. He is the lead author of several classic Wiley books: Transition to OO Software Development, August 1998, Building Application Frameworks, September 1999, Implementing Application Frameworks, September 1999, Domain-Specific Application Frameworks, October 1999, several books by CRC Press, Taylor & Francis Group: Software Patterns, Knowledge Maps, and Domain Analysis, December 2014 and Stable Analysis Pattern for Software and Systems (May 2017), Stable Design Pattern for Software and Systems (September 2017), and Lambert Academic Publishing, Enterprise and Application Frameworks (2019). Several new books in progress — Unified Stable Business Rules and Standard (USBRs&S) in progress (expected to be March 2020), Software Architecture On Demand, and Unified Software Engineering Reuse (USER), Unified Software Engineering (USE), Linguistic Engineering, the Art of Stable Abstractions in progress, and 36 Books on Cosmic symphonies (Translation in progress)

== Research interests ==
- Unified & Stable Software Engineering (USWE)
- Software Stable Model (SSM)/Concurrent Software Development Model /product/concurrent-software-development-model-sdm/ (CSDM), /product/software-stability-model-ssm/ SSM
- Unified Software Project Management (USPM)
- Fayad's Art of Abstraction (FAA)
- Unified & Stable Linguistic Engineering (ULE)
- Knowledge Map: Unified Domain Analysis (KM: UDA)
- Stable Analysis Patterns (SAPs)
- Stable Design Patterns (SDPs)
- Unified Software Architecture on-Demand (USA on-Demand)
- Unified Domain Standards (UDSs)
- Unified Domain Dictionary (UDD)
- Fayad's Unified Software Engines (FUSEs)
- Unified Software Engineering Reuse (USER)
- Fayad's Version of UML Modeling (F-UML)
- Unified & Stable Business Rules (USBRs) – A Future to Domain-less Freedom
- Unified Domain Knowledge Engineering (UDKE), such as
- Towards new horizons (Treasures of New Art, Science, and Engineering) Unified Words (UWs)

== Honors and awards ==
- Egyptian National Scholarship for Academic Excellency, 1969–1972
- IEEE Computer Society Press - EiC - Computer Science & Eng. Practice Board (95 – 97
- Communications of the ACM - Associate Editor (95–04)
- Communications of the ACM - Editorial Advisor (97–08),
- Communications of the ACM – Contribution Columnist (95–2004)
- The founder and First President of Arab Computer Society (2004–2006)

== Publications ==
- M.E. Fayad. “Object-Oriented Software Engineering: Problems & Perspectives “, Ph.D. Thesis, Ann Arbor, Michigan: UMI, June 94 (Thesis)
- M.E. Fayad and M. Laitinen “Transition to Object-Oriented Software Development.” New York: John Wiley & Sons, August 1998, ISBN 978-0-471-24529-2
- M.E. Fayad, D. Schmidt, and R. Johnson. “Building Application Frameworks: Object-Oriented Foundations of Framework Design.” New York: John Wiley & Sons, September 1999, ISBN 978-0-471-24875-0 – Translated to Simplified Chinese, House of Electronics Industry of The People's Republic of China, March 2003
- M.E. Fayad, D. Schmidt, and R. Johnson. “Implementing Application Frameworks: Object-Oriented Frameworks at Work.” New York: John Wiley & Sons, September 1999, ISBN 0-471-15012-1 – Translated to Simplified Chinese, House of Electronics Industry of The People's Republic of China, March 2003
- M.E. Fayad and R. Johnson. “Domain-Specific Application Frameworks: Experience by Industry.” New York: John Wiley & Sons, October 1999, ISBN 978-0-471-33280-0 – Translated to Simplified Chinese, House of Electronics Industry of The People's Republic of China, March 2003
- M. E. Fayad, H. A. Sanchez, S. G K. Hegde, A. Basia, and A. Vakil. “Software Patterns, Knowledge Maps and Domain Analysis”. Boca Raton, FL: Auerbach Publications, Taylor & Francis Catalog #: K16540, December 2014. ISBN 978-1-4665-7143-3
- M. E. Fayad. “Stable Analysis Patterns for Software and Systems,” Boca Raton, FL: Auerbach Publications, Taylor & Francis, Catalog #: K24627, May 2017. ISBN 978-1-4987-0274-4
- M. E. Fayad. “Stable Design Patterns for Software and Systems,” Boca Raton, FL: Auerbach Publications, Taylor & Francis Catalog #: K24656, September 2017. ISBN 978-1-4987-0330-7
- M. E. Fayad and Siddharth Jindal. “Stable Business Rule Standard: Analyzing, Designing & Developing Software Systems, Boca Raton, FL: Auerbach Publications, Taylor Francis, July 2020. ISBN 978-1-4987-5575-7 (in Progress)
- M. E. Fayad and David Hamu. “Enterprise and Application Frameworks” LAP LAMBERT Academic Publishing (June 17, 2019), ISBN 978-620-0-08252-7, translated to all European Languages
