= Hassan Hathout =

Hassan Hathout (Arabic: حسان حتحوت; born in Egypt on 23 December 1924 – died in Pasadena, California, on 25 April 2009) was an Egyptian-American doctor and professor of medicine who lived in Britain, the south-west Asia, and the United States. Frequently referred to as having an encyclopedic personality, Hassan Hathout was also a theologian, humanist, speaker, writer and poet. A medical school professor and chairman with degrees and certifications from the University of Edinburgh, the Royal College of Surgeons, the Royal College of Obstetricians and Gynecologists, the American College of Surgeons, the International Federation of Obstetricians and Gynecologists. Hassan Hathout was also a member of the World Health Organization's committee on the ethics of human reproduction.

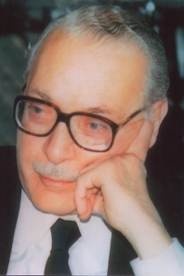
Dr. Hassan Hathout

Hassan Hathout's focal interests included the proper interpretation of his religion (Islam), development of interfaith work and organizations, highlighting the sanctity of human life, Medical Ethics, and work to reverse the arms race.

Hathout was also an affiliate or speaker in numerous organizations including: Omar Ibn Al Khattab Foundation at the University of Southern California, the center to Reverse the Arms Race, the California Science Center, the Crystal Cathedral, and The White House.

During the last decade of Hathout's life, his preaching was focused on propagation of the concept of ‘Love in God’.

Hathout was buried in Rose Hills Memorial Park in Whittier, California. His tombstone is engraved as: "Hassan Hathout. Man of God. Man of Science. Man of Love."

== Career ==
Hathout was the founding professor and chairman of the department of obstetrics and gynecology at the Faculty of Medicine, Kuwait University, professor of history of medicine, co-founder and member of the board of trustees of the Islamic Organization of Medical Sciences, member of the ethics committee for obstetrics and gynecology, CIOMS, WHO, Geneva, Switzerland, director of outreach, Islamic Center of Southern California, and co-founder of the Interfaith Council of Southern California, Los Angeles.

== Awards ==
- 1948, Token of gratitude, the Red Cross, Palestine
- 1979, Recognition of the Arab Board for Medical Specializations, Specialty of Obstetrics and Gynecology
- Order of Excellence (Nawt el Imtiaz) by the Egyptian government
- 1999 and 2001: Certificates of special recognition from the Congress of the United States
- Life Changer Award, Initiatives of Change International, Washington DC
- Outstanding Achievement Award by the Muslim Public Affairs Council, US
- Outstanding Achievement Award by the Shura Council of America, US
- 2001, Olive Branch Award, American Friends Service Committee, Los Angeles, for efforts at promoting peace and harmony between various faiths.
- 2005, Outstanding Achievement Award, Egyptian American Organization, US.
- 2005: Life Changing Award from the Initiatives of Change International Organization, Caux, Switzerland
- 2006, Outstanding Achievement Award by the Islamic Society of North America, US.
- 2006: Certificate of recognition from the Islamic Society of North America
- 2007: Recognition of Scholarly Mentorship of the Los Angeles Latino Muslim Community
- 2007: Certificate of recognition in community leadership, California State Assembly

== Publications ==
Hathout's published books include Reading the Muslim Mind, Thus Shall I Stand Before God (English version of original Arabic بهذا القى الله), Audible Silence, The Spirit of the Red Cross in the Teachings of Islam, الطبيب الانسان, Forgiveness in Islam, Topics in Islamic Medicine, Islamic Perspectives in Obstetrics and Gynecology, طبيات اسلاميه, Islam and Some Contemporary Issues, An Introduction to the Life of the Prophet, Personal Memoires, Wounds and Pleasures (جراح وافراح in Arabic Poem ديوان شعر), and Glimpses from the Qur'an (collated booklet dedicated to the heroes and victims of 11 September).

=== Selected bibliography ===
- My Friend: The Doctor, The Man (1975)
- "Wounds and Pleasures" (In Arabic Poem) (1977)
- Topics in Islamic medicine. International Organisation of Islamic Medicine. 1984. ISBN 978-99906-34-37-2.
- Islamic Perspectives in Obstetrics and Gynecology (PDF). Islamic Organization for Medical Sciences. 1986.
- Palestine 1948: Memoirs of an Egyptian Doctor (in Arabic). Arab Media Center. 1988.
- Forgiveness in Islam (PDF). Hassan Hathout Legacy Foundation. 1991.
- Reading the Muslim Mind (English and Spanish) * Hathout, Hassan (January 1995). Reading the Muslim Mind. American Trust Publications (ATP). ISBN 978-0-89259-157-2.
- A Brief Introduction to Seerah (PDF). Los Angeles: Multimedia Vera International. 1999. ISBN 9781881504504.
- Islam and Contemporary Issues (PDF). Los Angeles: Multimedia Vera International. 1999. ISBN 1-881504-52-2.
- Thus Shall I Stand Before God (English and Arabic) * Hathout, Hassan (1999). Thus Shall I Stand Before God. Multimedia Vera International. ISBN 978-1-881504-49-8.
- Personal Memoirs. Los Angeles: Multimedia Vera International. 2000. ISBN 1881504514.
- Audible silence: thoughts and remembrances of a Muslim elder. Shoroukintl Bookshop. 2006. ISBN 978-977-09-1897-5.
- The Spirit of the Red Cross in the Teachings of Islam (publication date unknown)
