= Mohamed El-Genk =

Nuclear Science Professor

Mohamed S. El-Genk
- Born: Egypt
- Education: Alexandria University, University of New Mexico
- Known for: Space nuclear power and propulsion, Thermal management, ISNPS
- Awards: ASME Heat Transfer Memorial Award (2017), ANS Arthur Holly Compton Award (2005)
- Scientific career
- Fields: Nuclear engineering, Space nuclear power, Thermal-hydraulics
- Workplaces: University of New Mexico

Mohamed S. El-Genk is an Egyptian-American nuclear scientist and a Distinguished Professor at the University of New Mexico (UNM). He is the founding director of the Institute for Space and Nuclear Power Studies (ISNPS) and is internationally recognized for his research in space nuclear power and propulsion, thermal-hydraulics, and advanced energy conversion.

== Early life and education ==
El-Genk was born in Egypt. He attended Alexandria University, where he earned his B.Sc. (1973) and M.Sc. (1975) in Nuclear Engineering. He moved to the United States to pursue doctoral studies at the University of New Mexico, receiving his Ph.D. in Nuclear Engineering in 1978.

== Career ==
Before his academic career, El-Genk spent several years in the energy and nuclear industry, notably serving as an Engineering Specialist at the Idaho National Engineering Laboratory from 1978 to 1981. He joined the faculty of the University of New Mexico in 1981. In 1984, he established the Institute for Space and Nuclear Power Studies (ISNPS). Under his leadership, ISNPS became a premier research organization, famously hosting the annual Symposium on Space Nuclear Power and Propulsion for over two decades.

In 2001, he was named the 46th Annual Research Lecturer at UNM, one of the university's highest faculty honors. In 2018, he was promoted to the rank of Distinguished Professor, the highest faculty rank at the university.

== Research and contributions ==
El-Genk's research spans several critical areas of nuclear and aerospace engineering:

- Space Nuclear Power: Extensive work on the design and safety analysis of space reactor power systems, including the SP-100 program.
- Thermal Management: Pioneer in the development of advanced radiators and high-performance heat pipes for space applications.
- Energy Conversion: Contributions to static energy conversion methods, such as alkali-metal thermal-to-electric conversion (AMTEC) and thermophotovoltaics.
- Safety and Thermal-Hydraulics: Research on boiling heat transfer, nanofluids, and reactor safety during emergency transients.

== Awards and honors ==
El-Genk is a Fellow of the American Nuclear Society (ANS), the American Society of Mechanical Engineers (ASME), and the American Institute of Chemical Engineers (AIChE). His accolades include:

- ANS Reactor Technology Award (2021) for advancing space and micro-reactor technologies.
- ASME Heat Transfer Memorial Award (2017) for contributions to boiling enhancement and electronic cooling.
- ANS Thermal-Hydraulics Technical Achievement Award (2015)
- AIChE-ASME Donald Q. Kern Award (2010) for excellence in transport phenomena.

== Selected publications ==
- El-Genk, M. S., A Critical Review of Space Nuclear Power and Propulsion 1984-1993, American Institute of Physics, 1994. ISBN 978-1563963179.
- El-Genk, M. S., Space Nuclear Power Systems, Orbit Book Co., 1985.
- Over 400 refereed journal articles and editor of 55 book volumes related to space technology and nuclear engineering.
