= Hala Halim =

Egyptian academic and translator

- Known for: Alexandrian Cosmopolitanism: An Archive (2013); English translation of Mohamed El-Bisatie's novel Clamor of the Lake
- Awards: Egyptian State Incentive Award for Literary Translation (2006); Harry Levin Prize Honorable Mention (2014)

Academic background
- Education: Alexandria University (BA, 1985); American University in Cairo (MA, 1992); University of California, Los Angeles (PhD, 2004)

Academic work
- Discipline: Comparative literature, Middle Eastern studies

Hala Halim is an Egyptian-American academic and translator.

She studied literature at university, obtaining a BA from Alexandria University in 1985 and an MA from the American University in Cairo in 1992. She completed her doctorate at UCLA in 2004. Halim has written extensively about literature and culture, covering subjects as diverse as Youssef Chahine, EM Forster and Constantine Cavafy. She is currently an assistant professor in the Middle Eastern and Islamic Studies department of New York University.

Halim has translated Mohamed El-Bisatie's novel Clamor of the Lake. The translation won an Egyptian State Incentive Award and was runner-up for the Banipal Prize in 2006.

Her monograph Alexandrian Cosmopolitanism received an Honourable Mention for the Harry Levin Prize by the American Comparative Literature Association in 2014.

== See also ==
- List of Arabic-to-English translators
