= Irene Ghobrial =

American-Egyptian physician and academic

- Born: Egypt
- Education: Wayne State University; Cairo University
- Scientific career
- Fields: Myeloma
- Workplaces: Mayo Clinic; Dana–Farber Cancer Institute; Harvard Medical School
- Website: www.dfhcc.harvard.edu/insider/member-detail/member/irene-m-ghobrial-md/

Irene Ghobrial is an American-Egyptian physician who is a professor at the Dana–Farber Cancer Institute and Harvard Medical School, where her research investigates early detection, mechanisms of disease progression and early interception of multiple myeloma. Her research is focused on why certain patients with monoclonal gammopathy of undetermined significance (MGUS) and smoldering multiple myeloma (SMM) develop multiple myeloma.

Ghobrial is the Senior Vice President for Experimental Medicine, Director of the Center for Early Detection and Interception of Blood Cancers, Co-Leader of the Lymphoma/Myeloma Cancer Center Program.

== Early life and education ==
Ghobrial lived in Nigeria for 13 years during her childhood and moved to Egypt and studied medicine at Cairo University. After graduating, she moved to Detroit, where she completed her specialist training at Wayne State University. In 2000, she moved to the Mayo Clinic in Rochester, Minnesota, where she worked with Robert A. Kyle as a fellow in hematology and oncology.

== Research and career ==
Ghobrial is a physician-scientist who specializes in multiple myeloma and Waldenström macroglobulinemia, specifically in the precursor conditions of monoclonal gammopathy of undetermined significance (MGUS) and smoldering myeloma.

She developed an observational study for precursor conditions (PCROWD study) that recruited over 4,000 patients with samples acquired at several time points during disease progression. Her efforts in the precursor field enabled a screening study for MGUS/SMM in the US. This study, named PROMISE, is currently screening 30,000 individuals at high risk of developing myeloma, including African Americans and first-degree relatives of patients with myeloma.

In January 2024, The Harvard Crimson reported that Ghobrial, as well as three scientists at the Dana Faber Cancer Institute, have been accused of research misconduct and data falsification. However, corrections have been made to her publications with no retractions and the errata did not affect the scientific integrity of the research conducted in those studies. She continues to focus her work on the area of early detection and interception in myeloma.

In April 2024, she was featured in an ebook published by The Scientist, entitled "The Sequencing Revolution", about monitoring multiple myeloma progression through sequencing. She developed with Gad Getz a new method termed MinimuMM-seq that can replace the use of bone marrow biopsies and FISH technology for the diagnosis and prognosis of multiple myeloma.

== Awards ==
- In 2010, she received the Robert A. Kyle Award for research in WM. In 2011,
- Ghobrial was elected to the American Society for Clinical Investigation.
- In 2017, she received the Ken Anderson Basic and Translational Research Award from the International Myeloma Society for an outstanding investigator under the age of 40.
- In 2018, she was awarded $10 million from Stand Up to Cancer to establish the Multiple Myeloma Dream Team, which aimed to understand the precursors that indicate a risk of developing myeloma.
- Ghobrial was awarded the William Dameshek Prize from the American Society of Hematology for her scientific contribution to the field of early detection and interception of hematological malignancies.
