= Noha Radwan =

Noha Mohamed Radwan is an Egyptian-American professor of comparative literature at the University of California, Davis. She was an Egyptian literary scholar and assistant professor of Arabic Literature at Columbia University and has also taught at U. C. Berkeley. She teaches "Introduction to Islamic Civilization". Her interests include modern Middle Eastern literature in Arabic and Hebrew, and she has a particular interest in modern Arabic poetry.

== Early life and education ==
Radwan was born in Cairo, Egypt. She received her MA from the Department of Arabic Studies at the American University of Cairo and her PhD from the University of California, Berkeley.

== In the news ==
In February 2011 she joined demonstrators in Cairo's Tahrir Square protesting the regime of Egyptian President Hosni Mubarak. For a week she recorded poetry, rhyming chants and music improvised by the demonstrators. She reported that she was attacked on the street and beaten by a mob of Mubarak supporters; there was a rally in Sacramento, California protesting the attack on her. The next month she published a report of her studies called Egypt's Revolution, in Verse in The Journal of Higher Education.

During a controversy at Columbia in 2005, Radwan told a reporter, "If some faculty are going to be accused of anti-Zionism, let me be among them to say I am anti-Zionist."

While a PhD candidate at UC Berkeley in 2003, she wrote about how modern Egyptian poets are using traditional poetry forms to convey nationalist ideas.

== Publications ==
Redefining the Canon: Shi'r Al- 'Ammiyya and Modernism in Arabic Poetry (2004) University of California Press.

A Place for Fiction in the Historical Archive, (Critique: Critical Middle Eastern Studies, Volume 17 Issue 1 2008, pp. 79–95)
