= Sherief Reda =

American computer scientist and professor

- Education: UCSD (PhD)
- Alma mater: University of California, San Diego, Ain Shams University
- Awards: IEEE Fellow, NSF CAREER
- Scientific career
- Fields: Higher Education, Computer Science, Electrical and Computer Engineering
- Workplaces: Brown University, Amazon.com
- Website: https://scale-lab.github.io

Sherief Reda is an Egyptian-American computer scientist and engineer whose research focuses on energy-efficient computing, electronic design automation (EDA), and approximate computing. He is a professor in the School of Engineering at Brown University and has worked in industry as a principal research scientist at Amazon.

== Education ==
Reda received his PhD in Computer Science and Engineering from the University of California, San Diego in 2006. He previously earned his Bachelor of Science (with distinction) and Master of Science degrees in Electrical Engineering from Ain Shams University.

== Career ==
Reda joined the faculty of Brown University in 2006. His research explores energy-efficient computing systems, embedded systems, and combinatorial optimization techniques applied to circuit design and computing systems.

He has also worked in industry, including serving as a principal research scientist at Amazon in supply chain optimization technology.

In 2022, Reda was elevated to Fellow of the Institute of Electrical and Electronics Engineers (IEEE) for his contributions to energy-efficient and approximate computing.

== Research ==
Reda’s research spans energy-efficient computing, approximate computing methodologies, embedded systems, and electronic design automation. His work has appeared in peer-reviewed journals and conferences in computer engineering and design automation.

He has co-authored books on power modeling and approximate circuits in computing systems.

== Selected publications ==
- Power Modeling and Characterization of Computing Devices: A Survey (2012)
- Approximate Circuits: Methodologies and CAD (2018)

== Awards and honors ==
- IEEE Fellow (2022)
- National Science Foundation CAREER Award (2010)
- Best Paper Award, IEEE/ACM International Symposium on Low-Power Electronics and Design (2010).
