= Zakya Kafafi =

Professor of Electrical Engineering

Zakya H. Kafafi
- Born: Zakya H.Kafafi; Cairo, Egypt
- Education: Rice University (PhD); University of Houston (BSc)
- Spouse: Filbert J Bartoli
- Children: 2
- Scientific career
- Workplaces: Lehigh University; National Science Foundation; US Naval Research Laboratory; Rice University
- Thesis: Infrared matrix isolation studies of the alkali-metal cyanides (1972)
- Doctoral advisor: John L Margrave

Zakya H. Kafafi is an Egyptian-American scientist who is a distinguished research fellow of the Electrical and Computer Engineering Department at Lehigh University. She was the first woman to be appointed to the National Science Foundation Director of the Division of Materials Research. At the US Naval Research Laboratory, she had established and led a section on organic optoelectronics. She carried out research on organic light-emitting materials and devices, and solar cells.

== Early life and education ==
Kafafi was born in Cairo, Egypt and went to a French private school called Lyçée Français du Caire with her two younger sisters. She became interested in chemistry whilst she was at high school, and has said that her science teacher Monsieur Georges referred to her as "the chemist". She started her undergraduate degree in chemistry at the University of Houston, where she minored in mathematics. She gave birth to her first child while she was a sophomore in college. She finished her undergraduate degree and moved to Rice University for graduate studies. While at Rice she gave birth to her second child and gained her MA and PhD in chemistry. She worked on low-temperature spectroscopy of high temperature materials using a technique called Matrix Isolation Spectroscopy. At Rice University, Kafafi was friends with one of the pioneers of Matrix Isolation Marilyn E. Jacox. After completing her doctorate, Kafafi moved to Cairo, where she was appointed assistant professor. She returned to Houston Texas in 1981.

== Research and career ==
In 1986, while still at Rice University, Kafafi learned about a position open in the Optical Sciences Division at the United States Naval Research Laboratory (NRL). Kafafi eventually joined NRL, where she established the organic optoelectronics section. She worked on nonlinear optical properties of organic and polymer materials using degenerate four wave mixing. She transitioned from chemical to materials and physical research, developing and studying the properties of OLEDs. Kafafi spent over twenty years working at the NRL, during which time OLED displays found their way into flat panel display televisions and computers, mobile phones and watches.

In 2007, Kafafi was appointed as National Science Foundation Director of the Division of Materials Research, during which time she oversaw a billion dollar budget. She was the first woman to hold the position. In 2010, Kafafi visited Egypt, where she looked to develop partnerships that promoted solar energy across the country.

In 2008, Kafafi joined the faculty at Lehigh University first as an adjunct professor and later as Distinguished Research Fellow in the Department of Electrical and Computer Engineering. She developed metallic plasmonic nanostructures that can increase light absorption and the efficiency of organic photovoltaics. These nanostructures make it possible to increase the optical absorption of the active layer of photovoltaics without increasing the layer thickness, allowing for improved device performance without compromising the flexibility or weight.

In 2011, Kafafi established a journal for the International Sociery of Optics and Photonics. She was the Editor-in-Chief of the Journal of Photonics for Energy for 10 years. In 2014, Kafafi became the inaugural Deputy Editor of the sister journal to Science Advances.

== Awards and honours ==
- 2004 NRL Edison Patent Award
- 2005 Elected Fellow of the American Association for the Advancement of Science
- 2007 Elected Fellow of The Optical Society
- 2007 Elected Fellow of the American Association for the Advancement of Science
- 2015 Elected Fellow of the Materials Research Society
- 2017 American Chemical Society Hillebrand Prize
- 2018 Kuwait Foundation for the Advancement of Sciences Kuwait Prize in Applied Sciences
- 2021 Elected Member of the National Academy of Engineering

== Selected publications ==
- Kafafi, Zakya H. (2019). Organic Electroluminescence. CRC Press. ISBN 978-0-367-39283-3. OCLC 1105948784.
