= Shahinaz Gadalla =

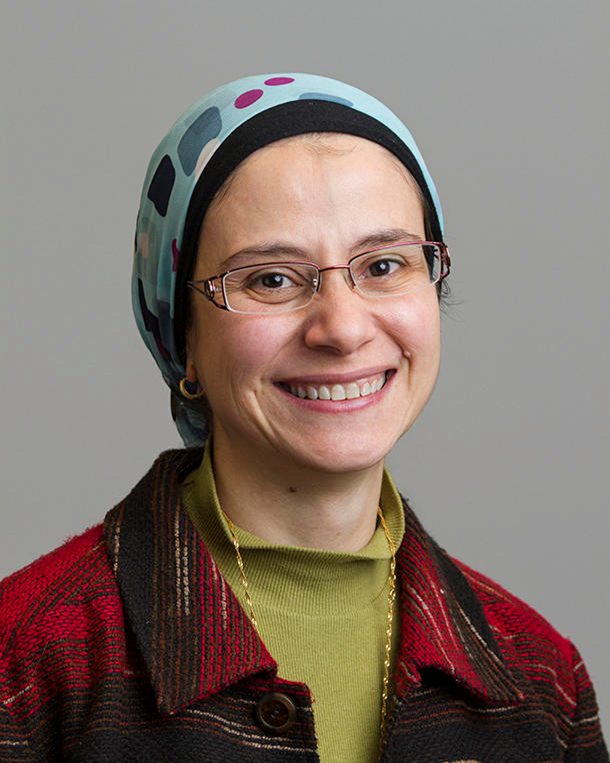
- Gadalla in 2015
- Education: Ain Shams University Faculty of Medicine; University of Maryland, Baltimore
- Scientific career
- Fields: Epidemiology, cancer biomarkers, hematopoietic stem cell transplantation
- Workplaces: National Cancer Institute

Shahinaz Mohamed Aly Gadalla is an Egyptian-American physician-scientist and cancer epidemiologist who researches cancer biomarkers and hematopoietic stem cell transplantation. She is a senior investigator in the clinical genetics branch at the National Cancer Institute.

== Life ==
Shahinaz Mohamed Aly Gadalla was born to Mohamed and Sabah. She earned a M.B.Bch from Ain Shams University Faculty of Medicine In 1996. She completed a medical internship in 1998 at Ain Shams University Hospitals. Gadallah completed a M.S. (2005) in epidemiology and preventative medicine and a Ph.D. (2008) in epidemiology from the University of Maryland, Baltimore. Her dissertation was titled, Systemic autoimmune rheumatic diseases and breast cancer risk in elderly women. Sania Amr was her doctoral advisor. Gadalla dedicated her dissertation to her daughter. She joined the clinical genetics branch (CGB) within the National Cancer Institute (NCI) division of cancer epidemiology and genetics as a cancer prevention fellow in 2008.

Gadalla was promoted to a staff scientist in 2011 and was appointed as an Earl Stadtman Tenure-Track Investigator in 2014. She was awarded National Institutes of Health (NIH) scientific tenure and appointed senior investigator in 2022. Gadalla's research interests focus on identifying and characterizing individuals at high risk of developing cancer and discovering predictive and prognostic biomarkers that may guide therapeutic decisions for those patients. In 2011, Gadalla and colleagues were the first to report epidemiological evidence of excess cancer risk in myotonic dystrophy (DM) patients. She also researches molecular predictors of outcomes after hematopoietic cell transplantation. Gadalla's work focuses on severe aplastic anemia and myeloid neoplasms with a goal of identifying biomarkers that can guide donor selection or patient risk stratification. Her investigations include markers of cellular aging, germline genetic variants, and somatic copy-number alterations.
