= Mootaz Elnozahy =

American computer scientist

Mootaz Elnozahy is an Egyptian-American computer scientist. He is currently a professor of computer science at University of Texas at Austin. He was a professor of computer science at the computer, electrical and mathematical science, and engineering (CEMSE) division at King Abdullah University of Science and Technology from 2012-2024. He previously served as Special Advisor to the President and Dean of CEMSE. Elnozahy's research area is in systems, including high-performance computing, power-aware computing, fault tolerance, operating systems, system architecture, and distributed systems. His work on rollback-recovery is now a standard component of graduate courses in fault-tolerant computing, and he has made seminal contributions in checkpoint/restart, and in general on the complex hardware-software interactions in resilience.

== Early life and education ==
Born Elmootazbellah Nabil Elnozahy ( المعتزبالله نبيل النزهي ) on March 21, 1962, in Cairo, Egypt, he attended the Lycée Francais du Caire from 1966 to 1979. He obtained his B.S. in electrical engineering (1984), M.S. in computer engineering (1987) – both from Cairo University. He moved to Houston, Texas, to attend Rice University, where he earned his M.S. and Ph.D. in computer science (1990 and 1993).

In 1993, he received the Ralph Budd Award for the best Ph.D. thesis in Engineering from Rice University. For 3 years, he was holder of IBM graduate fellowship while a graduate student at Rice. Mootaz won a Research Division Award at Thomas J. Watson Research Center(1992) for his contributions to the Highly Available Network File Server (HANFS) Project.

== Career ==
In 1993, he joined Carnegie Mellon as an assistant professor of Computer Science until he accepted a staff research member position at IBM Research division in 1997. From 1994 to 1997, he was a visiting research scientist at Bell Communications Research (Bellcore) as well as a consultant at Bell Laboratories Research (Lucent Technologies).

In 2005, he joined the Systems and Technology division at IBM as a senior technical staff, then, later, assumed a senior management position at IBM research in 2007 until 2012. In 2006, IBM awarded him the Master Inventor for life title, in recognition of his 56 U.S. Patents. Dr. Elnozahy collected various other IBM awards, including the Outstanding Invention Award, for innovative solutions in the Bureau of Census project in 2002, the President's Award in 2003, and the Outstanding Technical Achievement Award in 2008.

In 1998, he accepted an adjunct assistant professor in the Department of Computer Science at the University of Texas at Austin and became an adjunct professor in the same department and university in 2012 before accepting his current position at King Abdullah University of Science and Technology.

In 2024, he accepted an adjunct professorship in the Department of Computer Science at the University of Texas at Austin.

=== Selected publications ===
Melhem R; Mosse D; Elnozahy E. "The Interplay of Power Management and Fault Recovery in Real-Time Systems", IEEE Transactions on Computers, vol. 53, no. 2, pp. 217–231, February 2004. Elnozahy, E.N., Speight, E., Li, J., Rajamony, R., Zhang, L., Arimilli, L.B. "PERCS System Architecture", Encyclopedia of Parallel Computing, Springer Verlag, pp. 1506–1515, 2011. Elnozahy EN; Plank JS. "Checkpointing for Peta-Scale Systems: A Look into the Future of Practical Rollback-Recovery", IEEE Transactions on Dependable and Secure Computing, vol. 1, no. 2, pp. 97–108, February 2004. Elnozahy EN; Alvisi L; Wang YM; et al. "A Survey of Rollback-Recovery Protocols in Message Passing Systems", ACM Computing Surveys, vol. 34, no. 3, September 2002. Elnozahy EN; Zwaenepoel W. "Manetho: Transparent Rollback-Recovery with Low Overhead, Limited Rollback and Fast Output Commit", IEEE Transactions on Computers, Special Issue on Fault-Tolerant Computing, 41(5): 526–531, May 1992.

=== Awards ===
- 1995 – Career award from the National Science Foundation
- 2003 – Trailblazer Award from the University of Texas at Austin
- 2005 – Best Paper Award, 8th IEEE International Conference on Network Protocols
- 2010 – elected Fellow Member of the IEEE "For contributions to rollback-recovery, low-power computing, highly-available file systems, and reliable computing systems"
- 2011 – Best Paper Award, 2nd International Green Computing Conference
- 2013 – elected member, IFIP 10.4 Working Group
- 2021 – elected Fellow Member of the National Academy of Inventors
