= Ayman El-Baz =

American bioengineer

Academic background
- Education: BSc, Electronics and Communications Engineering, 1997, MSc, Electronics and Communications Engineering, 2001, Mansoura University; Ph.D., Electrical and Computer Engineering, 2006, University of Louisville

Ayman El-Baz is an Egyptian-American bioengineer. He is the Chair of the Department of Bioengineering at the University of Louisville's J. B. Speed School of Engineering. El-Baz is a Fellow of the American Institute for Medical and Biological Engineering and National Academy of Inventors.

== Early life and education ==
El-Baz completed his Bachelor of Science and Master's degree in Electronics and Communications Engineering at Mansoura University before moving to the United States and earning his PhD at the University of Louisville (UofL) in 2006.

== Career ==
Upon completing his PhD, El-Baz remained at UofL as an associate professor in their J. B. Speed School of Engineering and School of Medicine. In this role, he began investigating a non-invasive, less expensive way to detect signs of renal rejection. As such, he collaborated with Amy Dwyer and Garth Beache to develop RenalCAD, which uses an MRI instead of a biopsy to find signs of renal rejection. In 2011, he collaborated with PulmoCAD, LLC to create a computer-aided diagnostic method and software for early detection of lung cancer. The following year, he co-patented his co-created system for detecting nodules in CT scans of various tissues. He continued to research non-invasive, less expensive way to detect early signs of diseases which accumulated in a system to "identify individuals who have specific defects in distinct brain circuits" and prevent those circuits from sustaining further damage or dying in elderly people with Alzheimer's disease. His efforts were recognized internally by UofL with one of their 2019 Awards for Outstanding Scholarship, Research and Creative Activity. He was also recognized internationally with an election to the American Institute for Medical and Biological Engineering for "outstanding achievement in medical imaging and outstanding leadership in education, scholarship, and service to the field of bioengineering."

In 2020, El-Baz developed a non-invasive methodology to detect autism within the first year of life. In his pilot study, he was able to test over 1200 patients with a 94% diagnostic accuracy. His overall efforts into early detection earned him an election to the National Academy of Inventors.
