= Ahmed Ibrahim (Cupid Cabbie) =

Egyptian taxi driver in New York City known for arranging dates for passengers

- Born: c. 1955 (age 70–71); Egypt
- Occupation: Taxi driver
- Known for: Matchmaking

Ahmed Ibrahim (born c. 1955) is an Egyptian immigrant known as the "Cupid Cabbie" of New York City. From the driver's seat of his yellow taxicab, he has collected the names and phone numbers of over 2,000 New Yorkers and organized over 100 dates, over 30 of which have led to long-lasting romances. Ibrahim's service, which is free of charge, has been covered in The Wall Street Journal, the Fox News Channel and NBC's Today Show.

== Early life ==
An accountant by training, Ibrahim was born in Egypt and arrived in the U.S. in 1980. He started driving a yellow cab in December 1983, working 12-hour shifts, six days a week.

== Cupid Cabbie ==
To stave off boredom and ennui, Ibrahim developed a feng shui approach to driving his cab. He sprays Jordache "Romance for Women" perfume in the air of his Ford Crown Victoria. At Christmas he spends hundreds of dollars to cover the interior with cotton snow, string lights from the ceiling, and install intricate Christmas scenes in the back window. On Valentine’s Day he hands out roses to female passengers.

After driving his yellow cab for 16 years, Ibrahim’s match-making started by accident in 2004, when a woman began crying in the back seat of his cab. She had just broken up with her boyfriend and Ibrahim told her not to worry, that he would find her an even better boyfriend. Three days later, a man got into Ibrahim’s cab and bemoaned his bad luck in finding a woman. Ibrahim put him in touch with the crying woman and, a few weeks later, she called Ibrahim to tell him that they’d gone on a date and were getting along great. This inspired Ibrahim to match other passengers.

External videos
- You can watch a video by The Wall Street Journal about Ahmed Ibrahim, the matchmaking cabbie of New York City, here

After his initial success Ibrahim created a match-making system, based largely on intuition and common sense. He listens to his customers’ conversations, throws out a couple of exploratory questions and, if their answers meet his standards, he jots down their contact information.

The requirements are simple but sound: the men must have a job and cannot be "players." Men in their early 20s are usually ruled out as being "too young and wild." Older men who are "looking for Britney Spears" are dismissed for being creepy. Women who are "just looking for a sugar daddy" are crossed off the list.

Two key lessons which Ibrahim imparts, particularly to the men, are to be realistic in their expectations and to stop being superficial. He often tells them: "When I was in high school I was looking for Miss Universe. In college I wanted Miss America. Now, Miss Brooklyn would do."

Ibrahim communicates with his clients by phone and e-mail, working out of his tiny Borough Park, Brooklyn apartment on a battered Dell computer he found on the street over a decade ago. Although his service is free, The Wall Street Journal noted that it "may be New York City’s most exclusive dating service. The only way to get in? You have to ride in Mr. Ibrahim’s cab."

External videos
- You can view an NBC Today Show video featuring Ahmed Ibrahim and his matchmaking taxicab here

Within a few months in 2004, using his simple but sound approach, Ibrahim developed a lively and devoted clientele which included doctors, lawyers and graduate students. Other clients have included a fashion designer for Danskin Inc., a technology consultant at KPMG; and a former mayor of Morris Township, N.J., who requested a date for his son.

After stepping into his cab, and going on two dates set up by Ibrahim, a reporter wrote a front-page article about him in The Wall Street Journal. Ibrahim later appeared on Fox News Channel and NBC’s Today Show.

From the driver's seat of his yellow cab, Ibrahim has collected the names and phone numbers of over 2,000 New Yorkers and organized over 100 dates, over 30 of which have led to long-lasting romances. According to one client, Ibrahim is "better than Match.com. With Ahmed, the women actually call you back."

== Personal life ==
Ibrahim was divorced in 1983 and has not remarried. "Marriage is not for me," he said. "But I hope I can accomplish a few marriages."

== See also ==
- List of Egyptian Americans
