= Nagwa El-Badri =

Egyptian scientist

- Citizenship: Egypt
- Occupations: Researcher, Academic, Physician
- Title: Professor

Academic background
- Education: M.D., Ph.D.
- Alma mater: Zewail City of Science and Technology

Academic work
- Discipline: Biomedical Sciences
- Institutions: Center of Excellence for Stem Cells and Regenerative Medicine Zewail City of Science and Technology

Nagwa El-Badri is an Egyptian-American scientist, researcher and professor at Zewail City of Science and Technology.

== Education ==
Nagwa El-Badri has her Bachelor of Medicine, Bachelor of Surgery (MB Bch) degree from the Faculty of Medicine, Cairo University, Egypt. She has a Doctor of Philosophy degree from the University of South Florida’s College of Medicine in the United States of America.

== Career ==
Nagwa El-Badri is a Professor of the Biomedical Sciences Program at Zewail City of Science and Technology. She also serves as the Director of Biomedical Sciences Program. She heads the Center of Excellence for Stem Cells and Regenerative Medicine.

While at the University of South Florida,Nagwa El-Badri was the founder and Director of the Undergraduate and Graduate Program of Women’s Health at University of South Florida. She also established the graduate program in Aging and Neuroscience, and the Medicine and Gender Scholarly Concentration at the College of Medicine, University of South Florida.

== Publications ==
- Amniotic membrane promotes doxorubicin potency by suppressing SH-SY5Y neuroblastoma cell angiogenesis
- Promising wound healing activity of Saussurea costus loaded PCL–gelatin nanofibers
- Amniotic Membrane‐Derived Extracellular Matrix for Developing a Cost‐Effective Xenofree Hepatocellular Carcinoma Organoid Model
- Label-free live-cell-based electrochemical nano-biosensor for monitoring the hemolytic effect of Staphylococcus aureus α-hemolysin

== Award and recognition ==
El-Badri was awarded an Initial Investigatorship Award from the American Heart Association, she received the Women Appreciation Award from the Egyptian Academy of Scientific Research and Technology for 2020, and was noted as an Exemplary Leader in Management Position for Global Women in Stem by Meera Kaul Foundation. She is an Elected Fellow of the African Academy of Sciences.
