= Essam Heggy =

Earth & Planetary scientist

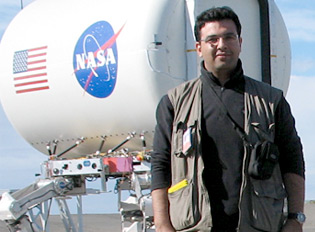
- Born: Tripoli, Libya
- Citizenship: United States; France
- Education: Cairo University; Sorbonne University
- Known for: Mars exploration and Rosetta mission
- Awards: JPL/NASA Mariner Award
- Scientific career
- Fields: Space sciences
- Workplaces: USC/JPL/NASA

Essam Heggy (Egyptian Arabic: عصام حجى, pronounced [ʕeˈsˤɑːm ˈħeɡɡi]) is an Egyptian-American-French space scientist of Egyptian descent.

== Education ==
Heggy was born in the city of Tripoli, Libya to an Egyptian family; his father is the Egyptian artist Mohamed Heggy. He was raised in Tunisia, Egypt and France. He was the Egyptian president advisor for scientific affairs from 2013 to 2014.

Heggy obtained his Ph.D. in astronomy and planetary science in 2002 with distinguished honors from the Sorbonne University in Paris.

== Academic career ==
His main scientific interests in space and planetary geophysics cover Mars, the Moon, icy satellites and near-Earth objects. Heggy is a member of the science teams of several planetary exploration missions, and he is a contributing scientist to several proposed planetary and terrestrial radar imaging and sounding experiments. Heggy taught academic classes and mentored several postdocs and graduated students in UCLA, Caltech, Cambridge University, Paris VI & Paris VII universities, Institut de Physique du Globe, Ecole Normale Superieure, University of Houston, Trento University and Columbia University.
