= Saad Z. Nagi =

Egyptian American sociologist

- Born: Saad Z. Nagi; April 30, 1925; Samalig, Menufia, Egypt
- Died: February 9, 2017 (aged 91); Dublin, Ohio, U.S.
- Occupation: Sociologist
- Spouse: Kay Gonder Nagi (married 1957)
- Children: 3
- Website: sznagi.com

Saad Z. Nagi was an Egyptian-American sociologist whose 1965 framework and subsequent research in the field of disability continues to underlie current U.S. disability policy, including the Americans with Disabilities Act In 1976, Nagi testified before the House Committee on Ways and Means, Subcommittee on Social Security in a hearing on the Disability Insurance Program.

== Career ==
Throughout his career, he held joint appointments in the Department of Sociology and the Department of Physical Medicine at the Ohio State University, as well as the positions of Mershon Professor of Public Policy, Chair of the Sociology Department at the Ohio State University (1982–1989) and Director of the Social Research Center at American University in Cairo (1990–1995).

Nagi followed up his work on disability in the 1960s-early 1970s with research related to social institutions dealing with child maltreatment. In the course of this work, he introduced a new way of estimating the actual incidence of child abuse and neglect the magnitude of the cases that were possibly going undetected. Related to this work, he offered testimony to the House Select Subcommittee on Education regarding the Child Abuse Prevention and Treatment Act in 1977. In the early 1990s, as Director of the SRC at American University in Cairo, he was the principal investigator for a national study on poverty in Egypt.

In his later years, he served a stint as editor of Population Review and as a member of the Board of Directors of Triglav Circle until his death
