= Mona Zaghloul =

Egyptian-American computer engineer

Mona Elwakkad Zaghloul is an Egyptian-American electronics engineer known for her work in integrated circuits, neural networks, and CMOS-based microelectromechanical systems. She is a professor of electrical and computer engineering in the George Washington University School of Engineering and Applied Science, where she directs the Institute of MEMS and VLSI Technologies.

== Education and career ==
Zaghloul earned a bachelor's degree in electrical engineering in 1969 from Cairo University. She went to the University of Waterloo in Canada for graduate study, earning two master's degrees in electrical engineering (1970) and applied analysis and computer science (1971) before completing her PhD in electrical engineering there in 1975. She was the first woman to earn an engineering doctorate at the University of Waterloo.

After postdoctoral research at Aalborg University and the University of Waterloo, she began working in industry in 1978, as a research contractor associated with the NASA Goddard Space Flight Center. In 1980 she returned to academia as an assistant professor at George Washington University. She was tenured there in 1983 and promoted to full professor in 1989. She was chair of electrical engineering and computer science from 1994 to 1998, and became director of the Institute of MEMS and VLSI Technologies in 1996.

She has also worked as a guest researcher at the National Institute of Standards and Technology from 1984 to 2006, and as program director in the Division of Electrical, Communications and Cyber Systems of the National Science Foundation from 2014 to 2016.

== Recognition ==
Zaghloul was named a Fellow of the IEEE in 1996, "for leadership in education and research in integrated circuit design and their application to neural networks". She won the IEEE Circuits and Systems Jubilee Golden Medal in 2000, and was an IEEE Circuits and Systems Society Distinguished Lecturer for 2000–2002. In 2008–2009 she served as president of the IEEE Sensors Council.

The University of Waterloo gave her an honorary doctorate in 2007. She was elected to the National Academy of Inventors in 2017.
