= Michael Mina (epidemiologist) =

Assistant professor of Epidemiology

- Born: Michael Joseph Mina
- Education: Dartmouth College; Emory University
- Scientific career
- Fields: Epidemiology, Ecology, Evolutionary biology, Genetics, Clinical pathology
- Workplaces: Harvard T.H. Chan School of Public Health; Harvard Medical School; Brigham and Women's Hospital
- Thesis: Cross-kingdom effects of a live attenuated viral vaccine on dynamics of and disease due to respiratory pathogens within divergent ecological domains: Introducing the generalized herd effect (2014)
- Doctoral advisor: Keith P. Klugman

Michael Joseph Mina is an American epidemiologist, immunologist and physician. He is a Senior Lecturer at M.I.T. Where he is a Co-Director of the Public Health and Resilience Lab at MIT Sloan and was formerly an assistant professor of Epidemiology & Immunology and Infectious Diseases at Harvard T.H. Chan School of Public Health, assistant Professor of Pathology at Brigham and Women's Hospital, Harvard Medical School, and Associate Faculty at the Broad Institute of MIT and Harvard.

He is currently the Chief Medical Officer and Chief Epidemiologist at Invivyd.

Mina is notable for his promotion of using rapid antigen tests to halt or slow the COVID-19 pandemic.

== Education ==
Mina attended Dartmouth College receiving his bachelor's degree in Engineering and Global Health in 2006. He attended Emory University for his MD and PhD in the NIH Medical Scientist Training Program (MSTP). His PhD was in immunology and ecology of infectious diseases and vaccines. Although receiving his PhD under the mentorship of Keith Klugman at Emory University, his doctoral research was performed at multiple sites including at the US Centers for Disease Control and Prevention (CDC), the National Institute for Communicable Diseases, Respiratory and Meningeal Pathogens Unit in Johannesburg, South Africa, the St. Jude Children's Research Hospital, and the Emory Vaccine Center.

Mina completed post-doctoral training at Princeton University in the department of Ecology and Evolutionary Biology and at Harvard Medical School in the department of Genetics.

Mina also completed his medical residency training at Harvard Medical School, at the Brigham and Women's Hospital, in Clinical Pathology.

== Career ==
At Princeton, Mina was based in Bryan Grenfell's laboratory, where he led research on the long-term immunological consequences of measles infections. The research led to the discovery that infection with measles can erase pre-existing immunological memory in a process called "immune amnesia." The discovery was reported in Science in 2015 and suggests that measles was once responsible for as many as half of all childhood infectious diseases deaths. Mina and Grenfell have both suggested that the discovery implies that measles vaccines may be the most important vaccine in terms of reductions in childhood infectious disease mortality.

As a post-doctoral fellow in genetics at Harvard, Mina worked with Professor Stephen Elledge where he furthered his research into immune amnesia. Using a tool called VirScan, which profiles hundreds of thousands of antibodies in a drop of blood that was developed earlier in Elledge's lab, they discovered that measles infections can erase between 20% and 80% of an individual's pre-existing antibodies. This discovery, also reported in Science in 2019, offered immunological evidence for the epidemiological and mathematical discovery made in 2015 with Grenfell.

Mina has more than 80 scientific publications, an H-index of 29, and over 3600 citations. The most cited articles are related to immunology and epidemiology. His lab at Harvard conducted research related to vaccines, serology (antibody and antigen tests), infectious models and immunity.

Mina claims that although the COVID PCR test is ideal for clinical testing, the paper tests (also known as "antigen tests" or "lateral flow tests" or "rapid tests") are superior to PCR tests for halting the pandemic because they are cheaper (about $1 to $5), faster (typically 15 minutes), can be done at home, and can be anonymous (no reporting to government agencies). Mina claims that the paper tests' lower sensitivity makes them superior (for halting pandemics, not for clinical use) because they are positive mostly only when one is contagious whereas the PCR tests are typically positive for weeks after one is no longer contagious.
