= Kawthar Zaki =

American electrical engineer

Kawthar Abdelhamid Zaki (born 1940) is an Egyptian-American electrical engineer, known for her work in microwave engineering including the design of microwave waveguides, resonators, and filters. She is a professor emerita of electrical and computer engineering at the University of Maryland, College Park.

== Education and career ==
Zaki is originally from Egypt, and is a 1962 graduate of Ain Shams University. She was the first woman to earn a doctorate in electrical engineering from the University of California, Berkeley, in 1969, and the first female engineering professor at the University of Maryland, beginning there in 1970.

== Recognition ==
Zaki was named a Fellow of the IEEE in 1991, "for contributions to the analysis of dielectric waveguides and resonators and their applications in microwave filters and oscillators design". She is also a Fellow of the Electromagnetics Academy.
