= Amr El-Bayoumi =

Egyptian-American actor

- Born: Amr El-Bayoumi; 1965 (age 60–61); Alexandria, Egypt
- Occupation: Actor
- Years active: 1998–present
- Height: 5 ft 11 in (180 cm)
- Website: https://amrelbayoumi.com

Amr El-Bayoumi (born 1965), is an Egyptian-American actor and voice artist. He is best known for the roles in the films Captain Phillips, The Fifth Estate and Psychosis.

== Personal life ==
He was born in 1965 in Alexandria, Egypt. He completed primary education from Bailey Elementary School in East Lansing, Michigan. He is currently based on Washington DC and New York City. After graduating with a degree in law, he moved to Los Angeles and assigned to L.A. as a chemical engineer.

== Career ==
He has performed in several productions in the US, England, and Egypt. In 2008, he starred in the short film 11 Missed Calls which opened him to show his talents. Then in 2009, he was selected for another short NASA and the Space Pen as 'narrator'. After two more shorts: The Drift and Loose End, El-Bayoumi made his feature film debut with 2013 film The Fifth Estate. In the film, he played a supportive role as 'General'. In late 2013, he was able to appear in the American blockbuster Captain Phillips as a crew member of Maersk Alabama.

He appeared in several popular American television serials in the recent past which include: House of Cards, Mr. Robot, The Blacklist, Madam Secretary, Quantico and Person of Interest.

== Filmography ==
Year	Film	Role	Genre	Ref.
2008	11 Missed Calls	Janitor	Short film	
2009	NASA and the Space Pen	Narrator	Short film	
2010	The Drift	Peter	Short film	
2012	Loose End	The Yank	Short film	
2013	The Fifth Estate	General	Film	
2013	Killzone: Mercenary	Voice	Video game	
2013	Captain Phillips	Maersk Alabama Crew	Film	
2013	Missing Something	Lenny Gayle / Earl Gayle	TV series	
2014	Person of Interest	Legionnaire No. 3	TV series	
2014	Jarhead 2: Field of Fire	Police Captain	Video Film	
2014	Madam Secretary	Guest	TV series	
2014	The Blacklist	Alliance Member No. 2	TV series	
2015	Mr. Robot	Freddie	TV series	
2015	The Visit	Wasim	Short film	
2016	Jacqueline Argentine	Nasir Al Nawala	Film	
2016	House of Cards	Ibrahim Halabi	TV series	
2016	Mother & Son	Myles	Short film	
2018	Quantico	Sheikh Samir	TV series	
2019	The Other Two	Qatari Businessman	TV series	
2019	Law and Order: Special Victim Unit	Bashir Nasar	TV series	
2019	The Code	Colonel Kavur	TV series	
2020	Our Cartoon President	Mohammad Bin Salman	TV series	
2020	El Mahal	Soheil	Short film	
TBD	Blue	Father Daoud	Short film	
TBD	Psychosis	Kamal Najjar	TV series	

== See also ==
- List of LGBT-related films of 2007
- List of Egyptian Americans
