= Dina H. Sherif =

Egyptian academic and entrepreneur (born 1977)

- Born: 21 February 1977 (age 49); Cairo, Egypt
- Citizenship: American
- Education: American University in Cairo (B.S. 1999, M.A. 2007); Harvard Kennedy School (M.P.A. 2018)
- Organization(s): MIT Kuo Sharper Center for Prosperity and Entrepreneurship
- Known for: Social entrepreneurship
- Title: Founding partner at Ahead of the Curve

Dina H. Sherif (born February 21, 1977) is an Egyptian-American academic, development expert and entrepreneur. Since 2019, she has served as the executive director of the MIT Kuo Sharper Center for Prosperity and Entrepreneurship at the Massachusetts Institute of Technology. Sherif is also a founding partner of Ahead of the Curve, a Cairo-based advisory and investment firm founded in 2012.

Between 2015 and 2017, Sherif held the Willard W. Brown Endowed Chair for International Business at the American University in Cairo, where she founded the university’s Center for Entrepreneurship and taught courses in business ethics and social entrepreneurship. Sherif has also served as a senior advisor to organizations including Ashoka and Silatech. She was recognized as a United Nations Global Compact Sustainable Development Goal Pioneer in 2016.

== Education ==
Sherif completed her Bachelor’s degree in Political Science and International Relations at the American University in Cairo in Egypt in 1999, followed by a Master of Arts in Economic Development from the same institution in 2007. She later earned a Master of Public Administration from Harvard Kennedy School in 2018.

== Career ==
=== Early career ===
From 2003 to 2006, Sherif was Deputy Director of Projects at FINTECS Consultants, she focused on rural development initiatives in sub-Saharan Africa. In 2006, she became Associate Director at American University in Cairo’s John D. Gerhart Center for Philanthropy and Civic Engagement. She later served as Senior Advisor to the same center until 2012.

=== Ahead of the Curve ===
Following the 2011 Egyptian revolution, Sherif co-founded Ahead of the Curve (ATC) with Mohamed El-Kalla to promote social entrepreneurship, inclusive market growth, and responsible business practices across the Arab world. As CEO from 2012 to 2019, she led initiatives that combined research, advisory services, and capacity-building programs for entrepreneurs and multinational corporations. During this period, Sherif became a member of the Presidential Advisory Council for Economic Development to the President of Egypt in 2014.

In 2014, ATC launched Entrepreneurship with Impact Ventures (EwIV), an early-stage social impact investment fund in the Middle East. EwIV provided both financial and non-financial support to startups and social enterprises. Sherif also championed programs supporting women entrepreneurs, including the Leap Program, which providesd training, mentorship, and peer support to early-stage women-led businesses.

=== Academic ===
At American University in Cairo, Sherif held the Willard W. Brown Endowed Chair for International Business and directed the Center for Entrepreneurship from 2015 to 2017. She was also teaching courses in business ethics and social entrepreneurship at the University. Previously, she had contributed to the establishment of the John D. Gerhart Center for Philanthropy and Civic Engagement in 2006. The center focused on research and training initiatives on corporate governance, philanthropy, and social impact at the American University in Cairo.

In 2019, Sherif was appointed Executive Director of the MIT Kuo Sharper Center for Prosperity and Entrepreneurship (former the MIT Legatum Center for Development and Entrepreneurship). At the Massachusetts Institute of Technology, the center was founded in 2007 by the Legatum Group and Iqbal Quadir, it was renamed in 2025. In 2025, under Sherif’s leadership, the MIT Kuo Sharper Center launched a five-year partnership with the Government of Botswana aimed at strengthening the country’s innovation ecosystem. MIT Kuo Sharper Center has also engaged with MIT Foundry Fellows from Botswana, Nigeria, Egypt, Ghana, Gabon, Kenya, Morocco, Senegal, Ethiopia, Rwanda, South Africa, and Zambia.

== Vision ==
In a 2025 article in Afridigest, Sherif argued that Africa should reclaim its historical identity as a center of innovation in order to reshape economic narratives about the continent. She pointed to early achievements in areas such as engineering, agriculture, medicine, and long-distance trade networks as evidence that innovation has deep roots in the continent. She also questioned terms such as “developing” or “emerging markets,” preferring “growth markets”. She emphasized that the language used to describe economies influences how investors and entrepreneurs perceive opportunity. In her view, recognizing Africa’s innovation heritage could strengthen confidence in African entrepreneurship and encourage greater investment within the continent.

== Publications ==
- From Charity to Social Change: Trends in Arab Philanthropy. American Univ in Cairo Press. 2008. ISBN 9789774162077.

== Recognitions ==
- 2016: Woman Entrepreneur of the Year in Egypt, awarded by the American Chamber of Commerce.
- 2016: Named one of ten United Nations Global Compact Sustainable Development Goal Pioneers.
- 2016: Recognized as a “Woman of Substance” by the Embassy of India in Egypt.
- 2016: Listed among the Egypt’s 50 Most Inspiring Women by WOE.
- 2019: Listed on Meaningful Business MB100 list.
