= Muhammad S. Eissa =

Muhammad S. Eissa is an Egyptian-American author and lecturer of Arabic at the University of Chicago, and prior to that was the Mellon Lecturer at the University of Michigan.

Eissa holds a bachelors, masters and a Ph.D. all from Al-Azhar University in Egypt. He also holds a C.Phil. degree from the University of California, Los Angeles. Eissa has been a professor of Arabic at American University in Cairo, Illinois Institute of Technology, Northwestern University and Brigham Young University. He is the consulting editor for the Middle Eastern Texts Initiative. Eissa is a Muslim. He serves as an educational advisor to the Islamic Schools League of America.

Eissa wrote along with James A. Toronto the article on textbooks in Egypt in Teaching Islam: Textbooks and Religion in the Middle East.

Eissa is currently a visiting professor at Colgate University in Hamilton, NY.

== Sources ==
- Muhammed Eissa, University of Chicago
- Middle Eastern Texts Initiative staff bios
- Review of Teaching Islam: Textbooks and Religion in the Middle East
- Campus Watch article on Eissa
