= Dhimah =

Egyptian dancer

Dhimah H. Goldsmith (August 25, 1900 – April 18, 1974) was a dancer of Egyptian ethnicity whose first New York City appearance was at the Guild Theatre on May 13, 1928. Often she performed to the traditional music of Bach and Chopin. In New York City Dhimah included several musical pieces by Béla Bartók, one of which was arranged to verses of the Koran. She was accompanied by an ensemble of thirteen dancers and three musicians. As an exotic dancer Dhimah is important for introducing a Middle Eastern style of dance to the United States. Dhimah studied dancing in Germany under the tutelage of Mary Wigman.

== Performances ==
In November 1928 she was featured in a dance recital at the Civic Repertory Theater, 14th Street (Manhattan), west of 6th Avenue (Manhattan). Following an absence of a season from performing, Dhimah returned to the stage in November 1930. She performed before an audience of 450 New York University students at the Washington Square Park center on February 13, 1931. Her first recital of the 1932 season came at the John Golden Theatre on April 18.
