= Mona A. El-Bayoumi =

Egyptian-American painter (born 1962)

- Born: 1962 (age 63–64); Alexandria, Egypt
- Education: Michigan State University
- Known for: painting

Mona A. El-Bayoumi (born 1962) is an Egyptian American painter and mixed media artist.

== Background ==
Born in Alexandria, Egypt in 1962, El-Bayoumi moved to the United States at the age of four, and was raised in East Lansing, Michigan, where her parents taught at Michigan State University. She earned a Bachelor of Fine Arts degree from Michigan State in 1985, specializing in drawing and painting. While a student, she spent a year in London where she studied studio art. In 1998–1999 she completed a nine-month program at the National Museum of Women in the Arts in Washington, D.C., and was certified in museum in exhibition planning and design from Georgetown University.

== Artwork and career ==
El-Bayoumi's work portrays people, animals, objects and landscapes in acrylic, watercolor, and mixed media on canvas to create. Her work has been described as "iconic imagery, saturated colors and whimsical subtlety with a mystical style." Stylistically, her work reflects her North African roots, North American training, and travel in Egypt, North Africa, the Caribbean, Mexico and Europe.

Thematically, El-Bayoumi's work focuses on issues of injustice, sexism, racism towards Arabs, and the consequences of war. She has worked on the depiction of women, contrasting "liberated Western Women" with "oppressed Arab Women" in ways that question who it is that is oppressed and in need of liberation.

== Notable works ==
El-Bayoumi created a mixed medium work depicting American activist Rachel Corrie, who was killed by an Israeli Defense Force bulldozer in 2003. Her 2004 work, Rachel Corrie, An American We Will Always Be Humbled By, juxtaposed images of Corrie with the US flag turning into hearts.
