= Tamer Shaaban =

American director and writer

- Born: Tamer Shaaban; November 2, 1988 (age 37); Buffalo, New York, U.S.
- Education: Georgia Institute of Technology
- Occupations: Film director, producer, screenwriter
- Years active: 2010–present

Tamer Shaaban (born November 2, 1988, in Buffalo, New York) is an American film director, writer, and producer of Egyptian descent. He was named one of the "25 Most influential and powerful young people in the world" by YSA which was sponsored by the Huffington Post.

== Life and career ==
Tamer spent his childhood in Saudi Arabia where he graduated from Dhahran School in 2007. He went on to receive a BS in Computer Science from Georgia Institute of Technology in May 2011 in Atlanta, Georgia. After graduating in 2011, he worked at Microsoft as a user experience designer before becoming a full-time filmmaker.

On January 25, 2011, he released a video montage onto the Internet showing the Egyptian people's frustrations with the then-regime that sparked the revolution. His first film, blocked in Egypt, Saudi Arabia, The United Arab Emirates, and Jordan, managed to receive over 2 million views. It was featured in The Huffington Post, went viral on Reddit, YouTube, and Facebook, shown 1.2 million times by the end of January on YouTube and shared more than 150,000 times on Facebook.

As commercial director, in 2016, he was the creative director and director of an inclusive campaign with Paralympic athletes, which celebrated disabled individuals. The campaign was featured on Slate Magazine. In 2019 he directed a social good advertisement with Lionel Messi for Lay's, celebrating young women's passion for football, for which he received the Silver Clio Sports Award.

== Films ==
=== Short films ===
Year	Title	Director	Producer	Writer
2009	Streetcorners	Yes	Yes	No
2011	Whispers of Shaitan	Yes	Yes	Yes
2017	The Crazy Ones	Yes	Yes	Yes
2019	Pause	Yes	No	Yes

Shaaban's movies have received awards at Atlanta's Campus MovieFest. Streetcorners won Best Drama at Georgia Tech and continued to the South Regional Grand Finale in 2009. The Whispers of Shaitan won Best Picture at Georgia Tech, was selected to screen at the Atlanta Film festival, and was selected to screen at the Cannes Film Festival. The film was also shared on Sami Yusuf's blog to help spread the message of the film.

His goal is to create films that can show life with more color, and he says that his life goal is to bridge the gap between the East and West believing that his films help catalyze the process.

== Videos and other work ==
Shaaban spoke on CBC about his film, its role, and the uprising against former President Hosni Mubarak at the end of January of that year. His second video shows students from different nationalities showing their support for Egypt and was released January 30, 2012. The video was featured on Al-Jazeera, was analyzed on Egypt's national television, as well as many different blogs.
