= Peter Shoukry =

Egyptian-American model

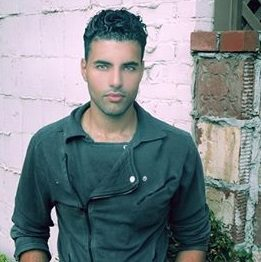
- City Photo Session
- Born: Giza, Egypt
- Occupations: Model, artist

Peter Shoukry is an Egyptian-American model and artist.

== Career ==
=== Early life and career ===
Shoukry was born in Giza, Egypt to a family of modest means who won a green card lottery and were able to immigrate to the United States when he was 10 years old. At a young age, Shoukry began experimenting with art and soon had completed several coal and pencil sketchings. At 17, Shoukry's art was featured in his first gallery (The Happening Gallery) in Los Angeles, CA. Soon, Shoukry gained a loyal following and had his work featured all across the state. Shoukry was able to gain an international following as well after he headlined the Man in Love World Tour, which was sponsored by the Presidency of the European Union.

=== 2012–present ===
Shoukry's foray into the modeling world occurred in early 2012 when he was approached by the founder of Slater Model Management who saw certain features that he felt his company needed. Shoukry signed with Slater immediately and was featured in a Eufora fashion show and campaign. Shoukry remained with Slater for 3 months before he parted ways and signed with Envy Model Management. With Envy, Shoukry was featured in numerous fashion magazine editorials including McKleinUSA, Traphic, Banana Republic, Dolce & Gabbana, and Express.

== Personal life ==
Shoukry was married on October 27, 2013. Shoukry is a Coptic Orthodox Egyptian American who is fluent in Spanish, Swedish and Arabic. Shoukry and his wife currently reside in the greater Los Angeles area. His other passions include reading, photography, sports, and graphic design.
