= Nader Masmoudi =

Tunisian mathematician

Nader Masmoudi (born 1974 in Sfax) is a Tunisian mathematician.

== Life ==
He studied in Tunis and then at the École normale supérieure in Paris with a diploma in 1996; In 1999 he received his doctorate from the Paris Dauphine University with Pierre-Louis Lions (Problemes asymptotiques en mecanique des fluides). He then went to the Courant Institute at New York University, where he became a professor in 2008.

Masmoudi is particularly concerned with nonlinear partial differential equations of hydrodynamics (Euler equation, Navier-Stokes equation, surface waves, gravity waves, capillary waves, acoustic waves, boundary layer equations and qualitative behavior of boundary layers, Couette flow, non-Newtonian fluids, nonlinear Schrödinger equations for waves and other dispersive systems, etc.), hydrodynamic limit value of the Boltzmann equation, limit behavior to incompressibility, chemotaxis (Keller-Segel equations), the Ginsburg-Landau equation, Landau damping, behavior of mixtures, general long-term behavior of semilinear systems of partial differential equations and stability problems in hydrodynamics . In 2013, together with his post-doctoral student Jacob Bedrossian, he strictly demonstrated the stability of the shear flow according to Couette for the two-dimensional Euler equations, i.e. in the non-linear case. The stability in linear approximation was already proven by Lord Kelvin in 1887 and more precisely by William McFadden Orr in 1907. He also obtained similar stability results in the viscous case for the boundary layer formation according to Prandtl in the two-dimensional Navier-Stokes equations (the linear theory is named here after Orr and Arnold Sommerfeld: Orr-Sommerfeld equations). He built on the work on a similar problem by Cédric Villani, who dealt with Landau damping, the damping of plasma waves, which in a strictly mathematical treatment also results from non-viscous phenomena (strong smoothness properties and mixing, sometimes non-viscous damping called (inviscid damping), technically so-called Gevrey regularity) resulted. Possible instabilities also result from non-linear resonances between different waves in the plasma (non-linear build-up with the “echoes” of the waves) and must be “mathematically controlled” in order to prove stability. The behavior of plasmas and non-viscous liquids described by the Euler equation is similar.

== Awards and honours ==
In 1992 he received a gold medal at the International Mathematical Olympiad (as the first African or Arab at all). For 2017 he received the Fermat Prize. In 2018 he was invited speaker at the International Congress of Mathematicians in Rio de Janeiro. In 2021 Masmoudi was elected to the American Academy of Arts and Sciences. In 2022 he was awarded the International King Faisal Prize jointly with Martin Hairer.

== Publications ==
- with Pierre-Louis Lions: Incompressible limit for a viscous compressible fluid, Journal de mathématiques pures et appliquées, Volume 77, 1998, pp. 585-627
- with Pierre-Louis Lions: Une approche locale de la limite incompressible, Comptes Rendus de l'Académie des Sciences, Ser. 1, Math., Vol. 329, 1999, pp. 387-392
- with B. Desjardins, E. Grenier, P.-L. Lions: Incompressible Limit for Solutions of the Isentropic Navier-Stokes Equations with Dirichlet Boundary Conditions, Journal de mathématiques pures et appliquées, Volume 78, 1999, pp. 461-471
- with Pierre-Louis Lions: Global solutions for some Oldroyd models of non-Newtonian flows, Chinese Annals of Mathematics, Volume 21, 2000, pp. 131-146
- with Jean-Yves Chemin: About lifespan of regular solutions of equations related to viscoelastic fluids, SIAM journal on mathematical analysis, Volume 33, 2001, pp. 84-112
- with Pierre-Louis Lions: From the Boltzmann Equations to the Equations of Incompressible Fluid Mechanics, Archive for Rational Mechanics and Analysis, Volume 158, 2001, pp. 173-193
- Incompressible, inviscid limit of the compressible Navier-Stokes system, Annales de l'Institut Henri Poincare C: Non Linear Analysis, Volume 18, 2001, pp. 199-224
- with Laure Saint-Raymond: From the Boltzmann equation to the Stokes-Fourier system in a bounded domain, Communications on pure and applied mathematics, Volume 56, 2003, pp. 1263-1293
- Examples of singular limits in hydrodynamics, in: C.M. Dafermos, Eduard Feireisl (Ed.), Handbook of Differential Equations, Evolutionary Equations, Volume 3, North Holland 2006, pp. 195-275
- with A. Blanchet, JA Carrillo: Infinite time aggregation for the critical Patlak-Keller-Segel model in $\mathbb R^2$, Communications on Pure and Applied Mathematics, Volume 61, 2008, pp. 1449-1481
- with P.Germain, J. Shatah: Global solutions for the gravity water waves equation in dimension 3, Annals of Mathematics, Volume 175, 2012, pp. 691-754
- with Jacob Bedrossian: Inviscid damping and the asymptotic stability of planar shear flows in the 2D Euler equations, Arxiv 201
