= Middle Eastern Americans =

Total population
- 3.5 million (2020); 1.06% of the population

Regions with significant populations
- Mostly in the major metropolitan areas

Middle Eastern Americans are Americans of Middle Eastern background. Although once considered Asian Americans, the modern definition of "Asian American" now excludes people with West Asian backgrounds.

According to the 2020 United States census, over 3.5 million people self-identified as being Middle Eastern and North African ethnic origin. However, this definition includes more than just the Middle East.

== History ==
One of the first large groups of immigration from the Middle East to the United States came by boat from the Ottoman Empire in the late 1800s. Although US officials referred to them as Turkish, most referred to themselves as Syrian, and it is estimated that 85 percent of these Ottoman immigrants came from modern Lebanon. Later, new categories were created for Syrians and Lebanese.

The number of Armenians who migrated to the US from 1820 to 1898 is estimated to be around 4,000 and according to the Bureau of Immigration, 54,057 Armenians entered the US between 1899 and 1917, with the vast majority coming from the Ottoman Empire. The largest Armenian American communities at that time were located in New York City; Fresno; Worcester, Massachusetts; Boston; Philadelphia; Chicago; Jersey City; Detroit; Los Angeles; Troy, New York; and Cleveland.

Another wave of immigration from the Middle East began in 1946, peaking after the 1960s. Since 1968, these immigrants have arrived from such countries as Iran, Iraq, Israel, occupied Palestinian territories, Syria, Egypt, and Lebanon.

=== MENA census category ===
The US Census Bureau is still finalizing the ethnic classification of MENA populations for the 2030 US census. Middle Eastern Americans are currently counted as racially White on the census, although many do not identify as such. In 2012, prompted in part by post-9/11 discrimination, the American-Arab Anti-Discrimination Committee petitioned the Department of Commerce's Minority Business Development Agency to designate the MENA populations as a minority/disadvantaged community. Following consultations with MENA organizations, the US Census Bureau announced in 2014 that it would establish a new MENA ethnic category for populations from the Middle East, North Africa, and the Arab world, separate from the "white" classification that these populations had previously sought in 1909. The expert groups felt that the earlier "White" designation no longer accurately represents MENA identity, so they successfully lobbied for a distinct categorization. This process does not currently include ethnoreligious groups such as Sikhs, as the Bureau only tabulates these groups as followers of religions rather than members of ethnic groups.

According to the Arab American Institute, countries of origin for Arab Americans include Algeria, Bahrain, Egypt, Iraq, Jordan, Kuwait, Lebanon, Libya, Morocco, Oman, Qatar, Palestine, Saudi Arabia, Syria, Tunisia, United Arab Emirates, and Yemen. As of December 2015, the sampling strata for the new MENA category includes the Census Bureau's working classification of 19 MENA groups, as well as Armenian, Afghan, Iranian, Israeli, Azerbaijani, and Georgian groups.

The new question on the US census will identify members of the MENA category to include:

"Individuals with origins in any of the original peoples of the Middle East or North Africa, including, for example, Lebanese, Iranian, Egyptian, Syrian, Iraqi, and Israeli."

== Population ==
Ancestry	US Census Bureau (2020)	Other estimates
Arab Americans	238,921	3,700,000
Armenian Americans	485,970	500,000–1,500,000
Emirati Americans	2,480	N/A
Iranian Americans	568,564	1,000,000–2,000,000
Iraqi Americans	212,875	N/A
Jordanian Americans	121,917	N/A
Lebanese Americans	685,672	N/A
Syrian Americans	222,196	N/A
Turkish Americans	222,593	1,000,000–3,000,000+
Israeli Americans	190,660	N/A
Coptic Americans	N/A	200,000–1,000,000
Assyrian Americans	57,944	110,807–600,000
Kurdish Americans	25,466	25,000–40,000
Berber Americans	3,871	3,000

The population of Middle Eastern Americans includes both Arabs and non-Arabs. In their definitions of Middle Eastern Americans, United States Census Bureau and the National Health Interview Survey include peoples (diasporic or otherwise) from present-day Iran, Israel, Turkey, and Armenia.

As of 2013, an estimated 1.02 million immigrants from the Middle East and North Africa (MENA) lived in the United States, making up 2.5 percent of the country's 41.3 million immigrants. Middle Eastern and North African immigrants have primarily settled in California (20%), Michigan (11%), and New York (10%). Data from the United States Census Bureau shows that from 2009 to 2013, the four counties with the most MENA immigrants were Los Angeles County, California; Wayne County, Michigan (Detroit), Cook County, Illinois (Chicago), and Kings County, New York (Brooklyn); these four counties collectively "accounted for about 19 percent of the total MENA immigrant population in the United States."

=== By ethnicity ===
Although the United States census has recorded race and ethnicity since the first census in 1790, this information has been voluntary since the end of the Civil War (non-whites were counted differently from 1787 to 1868 for the purpose of determining congressional representation). As such, these statistics do not include those who did not volunteer this optional information, and so the census underestimates the total populations of each ethnicity actually present.

Although tabulated, "religious responses" were reported as a single total and not differentiated, despite totaling 1,089,597 in 2000.

Independent organizations provide improved estimates of the total populations of races and ethnicities in the US using the raw data from the US census and other surveys.

According to a 2002 Zogby International survey, the majority of Arab Americans were Christian; the survey showed that 24% of Arab Americans were Muslim, 63% were Christian and 13% belonged to another religion or no religion. Christian Arab Americans include Catholics, Orthodox, and Protestants; Muslim Arab Americans primarily adhere to one of the two main Islamic denominations, Sunni and Shia.

== Notable people ==
- Ahmed Zewail, Egyptian-American scientist, known as the "father of femtochemistry", winner of the 1999 Nobel Prize in Chemistry
- Casey Kasem, Lebanese Druze, radio personality and voice actor, co-founder of American Top 40 franchise
- DJ Khaled, Palestinian, hip-hop DJ, rapper, music producer
- Gigi Hadid, half-Palestinian, model and TV personality
- Haim Saban, Egypt-born Israeli American, television and media proprietor
- Hoda Kotb, Egyptian-American, broadcast journalist and TV host on Dateline NBC and the Today Show
- Jamie Farr, Lebanese, character actor
- Jerry Seinfeld, half-Syrian, actor, comedian, writer, producer, and filmmaker
- Kim Kardashian, half Armenian, reality television star, socialite, model, businesswoman, producer, and actress
- Mohamed Atalla, Egyptian-American engineer, inventor of MOSFET (metal–oxide–semiconductor field-effect transistor), pioneer in silicon semiconductors and security systems, founder of Atalla Corporation
- Mehmet Öz, Turkish, cardiothoracic surgeon, formerly host of The Dr. Oz Show
- Paul Anka, Lebanese, singer/songwriter
- Paula Abdul, half-Syrian, Emmy and Grammy award-winning singer, dancer, choreographer, actress, and TV personality
- Peter Attia, Egyptian-American physician known for his work in longevity medicine.
- Rami Malek, Egyptian-American, Emmy Award and Academy Award - winning actor for Bohemian Rhapsody
- Sam Esmail, Egyptian-American screenwriter and director, creator of Mr. Robot and director of Leave the World Behind
- Shannon Elizabeth, Syrian-Lebanese, film actress (American Pie, Scary Movie)
- Tony Shalhoub, Lebanese, three-time Emmy Award-winning television actor on Monk

=== Academia ===
- Aaron Cohen-Gadol, internationally renowned neurosurgeon specializing in surgical treatment of brain tumors and aneurysms
- Abass Alavi, professor of radiology, Nuclear Medicine and Neurology at the University of Pennsylvania
- Abbas Alizadeh, archeologist of ancient Iran; former senior research associate and director of the Iranian Prehistoric Project at the University of Chicago
- Abbas Amanat, professor of history and international studies at Yale University
- Abbas Ardehali, surgical director of UCLA's Heart and Lung Transplant program
- Abbas El Gamal, Egyptian-American electrical engineer, educator and entrepreneur, the recipient of the 2012 Claude E. Shannon Award
- Abbas Milani, director of Iranian studies program at Stanford University; research fellow & co-director of the "Iran Democracy Project" at Stanford's Hoover Institution
- Abbas Mirakhor, economist; former executive director and dean of board of the International Monetary Fund (IMF); Distinguished Scholar and chair in Islamic Finance at Malaysia's INCEIF (International Centre for Education in Islamic Finance)
- Abdel-Moniem El-Ganayni, Egyptian-American nuclear physicist, former senior scientist at Bettis Atomic Power Laboratory
- Abolhassan Astaneh-Asl, structural engineer and professor at University of California, Berkeley; investigated the collapse of the World Trade Center towers due to the September 11 attacks
- Adah al-Mutairi (Saudi Arabian), inventor and scholar in nanotechnology and nanomedicine
- Adam Hamawy, Egyptian-American reconstructive surgeon and former United States Army combat surgeon
- Adel Mahmoud, Egyptian-American former president of the Merck & Co. vaccine division and Princeton University professor; led development of HPV, rotavirus, and shingles vaccines
- Afaf Meleis, Egyptian-American nurse-scientist and Dean Emerita of Nursing at the University of Pennsylvania; developed "Transitions Theory"
- Afshin Molavi, author and expert on global geo-political risk and geo-economics, particularly the Middle East and Asia.
- Ahmad Karimi-Hakkak, Iranist, scholar of modern Persian literature, and professor and founding director of the Roshan Center for Persian Studies at the University of Maryland
- Ahmad Sadri, sociologist and professor of sociology and anthropology at Lake Forest College, and the James P. Gorter Professor of Islamic World Studies since 2007. Active in the reform movement in Iran.
- Ahmed Ghoniem, Egyptian-American professor of mechanical engineering at MIT; directs the Center for Energy and Propulsion Research
- Ahmed Hassanein, Egyptian-American Distinguished Professor of Nuclear Engineering at Purdue University; expert in fusion materials and nanolithography
- Ahmed I. Zayed, Egyptian-American mathematician at DePaul University; works on mathematical analysis and signal processing
- Ahmed Rashad Abdel-khalik, Egyptian-American accounting scholar at the University of Illinois Urbana–Champaign
- Ahmed Sameh, Egyptian-American computer scientist at Purdue University; pioneer in parallel numerical algorithms and high-performance computing
- Ahmed Subhy Mansour, Egyptian-American Islamic scholar and founder of the Quranist movement; former Visiting Fellow at Harvard Law School
- Ahmed Tewfik, Egyptian-American electrical engineer, Professor and college administrator
- Alan Mikhail, Egyptian-American historian and Chace Family Professor of History at Yale University; specialist in Ottoman and environmental history
- Albert Fathi, Egyptian-American mathematician at the Georgia Institute of Technology specializing in dynamical systems; Sophie Germain Prize winner
- Alex Hanna, Egyptian-American sociologist and director of research at the Distributed AI Research Institute; co-author of The AI Con
- Alexander Abian, mathematician, Iowa State University (Iranian-Armenian)
- Alexander Badawy, Egyptian-American Egyptologist and professor of art history at UCLA
- Alexander L. George (born Alexander L. Givargis), behavioral scientist specialist in the psychological effects of nuclear crisis management, Graham H. Stuart professor emeritus of political science at Stanford University
- Ali H. Nayfeh, Palestinian American mechanical engineer, the 2014 recipient of Benjamin Franklin Medal in mechanical engineering
- Ali Hajimiri, inventor, technologist, and Thomas G. Myers Professor of Electrical Engineering at Caltech. Fellow of the National Academy of Inventors (NAI)
- Ali Jadbabaie, systems theorist, network scientist, and the JR East Professor of Engineering at Massachusetts Institute of Technology
- Ali Jafari, professor of computer and information technology at Purdue University, director of the CyberLab at Indiana University-Purdue University Indianapolis (IUPUI)
- Ali Javan, physicist, inventor of gas laser; Professor Emeritus of Physics at MIT
- Ali Khademhosseini, Levi Knight Endowed Professor at the University of California-Los Angeles. Holds a professorship in bioengineering, radiology, chemical, and biomolecular engineering.
- Ali R. Rabi, scholar at the Center for International Development and Conflict Management at University of Maryland, College Park; founding chair of the Middle Eastern Citizens Assembly; Initiated the International University of Iran in 2001.
- Ali S. Hadi, Egyptian-American statistician and emeritus professor at Cornell University
- Alimorad Farshchian, medical doctor, medical author, and founder and director of The Center of Regenerative Medicine in Miami, Florida
- Alireza Shapour Shahbazi, lecturer in Achaemenid archeology and Iranology at Harvard University, full professor of history in Eastern Oregon University
- Allah Verdi Mirza Farman Farmaian, professor and head of Biology department at Rutgers University
- Alp Ikizler, nephrologist, holder of the Catherine McLaughlin Hakim Chair in Medicine at Vanderbilt University School of Medicine
- Amr El Abbadi, Egyptian-American Distinguished Professor of Computer Science at the University of California, Santa Barbara; IEEE and ACM fellow
- Angella Nazarian (née Angella Maddahi), former professor of psychology at Mount St. Mary's University, California State University, Long Beach & the Los Angeles Valley College. Co-founder of Looking Beyond
- Anousheh Ansari, first Iranian in space and the first female space tourist;
- Anthony Atala, director of the Wake Forest Institute for Regenerative Medicine (Lebanese)
- Aram Chobanian, dean of Boston University School of Medicine
- Arif Dirlik
- Armen Der Kiureghian, professor of civil engineering at University of California, Berkeley, member of US National Academy of Engineering, current president of the American University of Armenia
- Asef Bayat, professor of sociology and Middle Eastern studies at the University of Illinois at Urbana–Champaign
- Asım Orhan Barut, University of Colorado-Boulder physicist
- Ayaad Assaad, Egyptian-American microbiologist and toxicologist, formerly at USAMRIID
- Ayman El-Baz, Egyptian-American bioengineer and chair of Bioengineering at the University of Louisville; medical imaging and computer-aided diagnosis
- Azer Bestavros, Egyptian-American computer scientist and Associate Provost for Computing & Data Sciences at Boston University
- Azita Emami, Andrew and Peggy Cherng professor of electrical engineering and medical engineering at Caltech; Executive Officer of the Department of Electrical Engineering at Caltech
- Aziz Sancar, biochemist and molecular biologist specializing in DNA repair, cell cycle checkpoints, and circadian clock. Nobel Prize in Chemistry, 2015 (Turkish)
- Babak Azizzadeh, facial plastic and reconstructive surgeon, Keck School of Medicine of USC
- Babak Hassibi, electrical engineer, the inaugural Mose and Lillian S. Bohn Professor of Electrical Engineering. Specialist in communications, signal processing and control.
- Bahgat G. Sammakia, Egyptian-American Vice President for Research at Binghamton University and former interim president of SUNY Polytechnic Institute
- Bahram Mashhoon, general relativity physicist and professor of physics at the University of Missouri. Through his research works, he has given important contributions to general relativity, particularly to the gravitomagnetic clock effect. He is also active in the field of non-local gravity
- Barbara Sahakian, professor of Clinical Neuropsychology at University of Cambridge
- Behnaam Aazhang, J. S. Abercrombie Professor in Electrical and Computer Engineering at Rice University (Iranian)
- Behzad Razavi, professor of electrical engineering and director of the Communications Circuit Laboratory at the University of California, Los Angeles. y
- Bobak Ferdowsi, systems engineer at NASA's Jet Propulsion Laboratory; served on the Cassini–Huygens and Mars Science Laboratory Curiosity mission.
- Camran Nezhat, laparoscopic surgeon and director of Stanford Endoscopy Center for Training & Technology, Stanford University
- Charbel Farhat, Vivian Church Hoff Professor of Aircraft Structures; Director of the Army High Performance Computing Research Center; Chair of the Department of Aeronautics and Astronautics, Stanford University (Lebanese)
- Charles Elachi, Lebanese American professor of electrical engineering and planetary science at Caltech and the former director of the Jet Propulsion Laboratory
- Charles Issawi, Egyptian-American economist and historian of the Middle East at Columbia University and Princeton University
- Ciğdem Balım
- Cumrun Vafa, string theorist and Donner Professor of Science at Harvard University. Recipient of the 2008 Dirac Medal and the 2016 Breakthrough Prize in Fundamental Physics.
- Cyrus Shahabi, chair of the Computer Science Department, University of Southern California
- Dara Entekhabi, Bacardi and Stockholm Water Foundations Professor in the Department of Civil & Environmental Engineering and the Department of Earth, Atmospheric & Planetary Sciences at MIT. His main expertise is in the field of hydrology.
- Darius Rejali, professor of political science at Reed College and scholar specialized in the study of torture. He has served on the board of the Human Rights Review since 2000.
- Daron Acemoglu, economist, of Armenian descent
- Daron Acemoglu, economist at Massachusetts Institute of Technology
- David B. Samadi, vice chairman of the Department of Urology and Chief of Robotics and Minimally Invasive Surgery at the Icahn School of Medicine at Mount Sinai
- Dina H. Sherif, Egyptian-American executive director of the MIT Kuo Sharper Center for Prosperity and Entrepreneurship at MIT
- Dina Katabi, Syrian American professor of electrical engineering and computer science at MIT and the director of the MIT Wireless Center.
- Djavad Salehi-Isfahani, professor of economics at Virginia Tech, and visiting fellow at the Middle East Youth Initiative at the Wolfensohn Center for Development at the Brookings Institution. His expertise is on demographic & energy economics and the economics of Iran & the larger Middle East
- Donna Shalala, president of the University of Miami (Lebanese)
- Donny George Youkhanna, Iraqi archaeologist, anthropologist, author, curator, and scholar, and visiting professor at Stony Brook University in New York, internationally known as "the man who saved the Iraqi National Museum."
- Doreen Granpeesheh, clinical psychologist, and producer of the documentary Recovered: Journeys Through the Autism Spectrum and Back.
- Eden Naby, Iranian-Assyrian cultural historian of Central Asia and the Middle East, who is notable for her publications, research, and preservation work on Assyrian culture and history
- Edip Yüksel, Islamic philosopher and intellectual, cfigures in the modern Islamic reform and Quranism movements
- Edward Goljan, professor of pathology at Oklahoma State University Center for Health Sciences
- Edward Said, Palestinian-Lebanese American literary theorist and former professor at Columbia University
- Ehsan Yarshater, founder and editor in chief of Encyclopaedia Iranica, first full-time professor at a US university since World War II; Hagop Kevorkian Professor Emeritus of Iranian Studies; director of the Center for Iranian Studies, Columbia University;
- Elham Kazemi, mathematics educator and educational psychologist; Geda and Phil Condit Professor in Math and Science Education in the College of Education of the University of Washington
- Elias J. Corey, organic chemistry professor at Harvard University, winner of the 1990 Nobel Prize in Chemistry (Lebanese parents)
- Elias Zerhouni, former director of the National Institutes of Health (Algerian)
- Eliz Sanasarian, professor of political science at the University of Southern California. Specialist ethnic politics and feminism, particularly regarding the Middle East and Iran
- Ella Shohat, professor, author and activist (Iraqi-Jewish)
- Emad Shahin, Egyptian-American political scientist specializing in political Islam; former professor at Georgetown University and Columbia University
- Eman Ghoneim, Egyptian-American geomorphologist at the University of North Carolina Wilmington; discovered a "mega-lake" in Darfur via remote sensing
- Ervand Abrahamian, historian of Middle Eastern (particularly Iranian) history at City University of New York (Iranian)
- Esfandiar Maasoumi, econometrician and economist. He is a distinguished professor at Emory University and a fellow of the Royal Statistical Society
- Essam Heggy, Egyptian-American Planetary scientist
- Fadi Chehadé, Egyptian-American technology executive, founder of RosettaNet and former CEO of ICANN
- Fadwa El Guindi, Egyptian-American anthropologist, author of The Myth of Ritual and By Noon Prayer
- Fakhreddin Azimi, professor of history at the University of Connecticut
- Fariba Fahroo, mathematician, program manager at the Air Force Office of Scientific Research. Along with I. M. Ross, she has published papers in pseudospectral optimal control theory. The Ross–Fahroo lemma and the Ross–Fahroo pseudospectral method are named after her
- Farid Khavari, economist, specialist in economics, environment, oil, healthcare, & the Middle East.
- Farinaz Koushanfar, professor and Henry Booker Faculty Scholar of Electrical and Computer Engineering at the University of California, San Diego
- Farnam Jahanian, computer scientist and the 10th president of Carnegie Mellon University
- Farouk El-Baz Egyptian-American space scientist who worked with NASA to assist in the planning of scientific exploration of the Moon
- Faruk Gül, professor of economics, Princeton University
- Farzad Mostashari, internal medicine physician, former national coordinator for health information technology at United States Department of Health and Human Services
- Farzaneh Milani, professor of Persian Literature & Women's Studies at the University of Virginia, and the chair of the Department of Middle Eastern and South Asian Languages & Cultures.
- Fatemeh Keshavarz, scholar of Rumi and Farsi language & poetry, and poet in Persian and English; Director & Chair of Roshan Institute for Persian Studies at the University of Maryland. Previously, was a professor of Persian Language and Comparative Literature at Washington University in St. Louis
- Fatemeh Shams, contemporary Persian poet, and assistant professor of Persian literature at the University of Pennsylvania
- Fathi Osman, Egyptian-American Islamic scholar and author on Islamic reform, pluralism, and human rights
- Fawwaz T. Ulaby Syrian American professor of electrical engineering and computer science, former vice president of research for the University of Michigan; first Arab American winner of the IEEE Edison Medal
- Fereydoon Family, leading physicist in the field of nanotechnology and solid-state physics. He is the Samuel Candler Dobbs Professor of Physics at Emory University
- Feza Gürsey, mathematician and physicist
- Firouz Naderi, former NASA director of Mars project. Has also served in other various technical and executive positions at NASA's Jet Propulsion Laboratory.
- Firouz Partovi, physicist; founder and former chairman of the Faculty of Physics at the Sharif University of Technology. He has also taught at MIT and Harvard University.
- Firuz Kazemzadeh, historian of Russian and Iranian history, and professor emeritus of history at Yale University.
- Fouad Ajami, professor of international relations (Lebanese)
- François M. Abboud, Egyptian-American cardiologist and professor emeritus at the Carver College of Medicine, University of Iowa
- G. A. Mansoori, professor of chemical engineering at University of Illinois at Chicago
- Gamal Refai-Ahmed, Egyptian-American engineer known for thermal management and advanced packaging work at AMD, GE, Cisco, and Nortel
- Gawdat Bahgat, Egyptian-American political scientist at the National Defense University; energy security and nuclear proliferation
- George Bournoutian, historian, professor of history at Iona College, and author of over 30 books on the history of Armenia, Iran, and the Caucasus
- George Piranian, professor of mathematics at the University of Michigan
- Georges Abi-Saab, Egyptian-American professor of international law and international judge
- Gevork Minaskanian, professor of organic chemistry at Virginia Commonwealth University
- Ghavam Shahidi, electrical engineer and IBM Fellow, Director of Silicon Technology at IBM's Watson's Laboratory
- Gholam A. Peyman, ophthalmologist, retina surgeon, and inventor of LASIK eye surgery
- Gholam Reza Afkhami, senior scholar and director of Social Science Research and International Studies at the Foundation for Iranian Studies
- Habib Levy, historian, specialist in the history of Jews in Iran; author of Comprehensive History of the Jews of Iran: The Outset of the Diaspora.
- Hala Halim, Egyptian-American academic and translator in Middle Eastern and Islamic Studies at New York University
- Haleh Esfandiari, Middle East scholar and former director of the Middle East Program at the Woodrow Wilson International Center for Scholars. She is an expert on contemporary Iranian intellectual currents and politics, as well as women's issues and democratic developments in the Middle East. She was one of the four Iranian Americans falsely convicted and detained by the Iranian government in May 2007.
- Hamid Dabashi, professor of Iranian studies and comparative literature at Columbia University in New York City
- Hamid Jafarkhani, leading communication theorist and chancellor's professor of electrical engineering and computer science at the University of California, Irvine
- Hamid Mowlana, professor emeritus of international relations and founding director of the Division of International Communication at the School of International Service at American University. In 2003, he was honored as a "Chehrehaye Mandegar" (Eternal One) by Iranian universities and academies.
- Hamid Naficy, scholar of cultural studies of diaspora, exile, & postcolonial cinemas and media, and of Iranian & Middle Eastern cinemas. Hamad Bin Khalifa Al-Thani Professor in Communication at Northwestern University .
- Hamid Shirvani, architecture scholar, former president of Briar Cliff University, former chancellor of North Dakota University System.
- Hany Farid, Egyptian-American professor of computer science at Dartmouth College, pioneer in Digital forensics
- Harry Daghlian, academic scientist
- Hasan M. El-Shamy, Egyptian-American folklorist and professor emeritus at Indiana University Bloomington
- Hasan Özbekhan
- Hassan Aref, Egyptian-American physicist and former Dean of Engineering at Virginia Tech; discovered chaotic advection
- Hassan Hathout, Egyptian-American physician, professor of medicine, and writer on medical ethics and interfaith dialogue
- Hassan Jawahery, physicist, former spokesman of the BaBar Collaboration, and professor of physics at the University of Maryland
- Hassan K. Khalil, Egyptian-American electrical engineer and University Distinguished Professor Emeritus at Michigan State University; nonlinear control
- Hassan Kamel Al-Sabbah, Lebanese American technology innovator. He received 43 patents covering his work. Among the patents were reported innovations in television transmission.
- Hazhir Rahmandad, engineer and expert in dynamic modeling and system dynamics. Associate Professor in the System Dynamics group at the MIT Sloan School of Management.
- Heba Kadry, Egyptian-American mastering engineer who has worked with Björk and Ryuichi Sakamoto
- Helmy Eltoukhy, Egyptian-American electrical engineer and co-founder/CEO of Guardant Health; liquid biopsy pioneer
- Henri Dorra, Egyptian-American art historian and Professor Emeritus at the University of California, Santa Barbara; specialist in French Symbolist art
- Hisham Sharabi professor emeritus of history and Umar al-Mukhtar Chair of Arab Culture at Georgetown University (Palestinian)
- Homayoon Kazerooni, roboticist and professor of mechanical engineering at the University of California, Berkeley; director of the Berkeley Robotics and Human Engineering Laboratory
- Homayoun Seraji, senior research scientist at NASA's Jet Propulsion Laboratory and Caltech, former professor at Sharif University of Technology. Works in the field of robotics and space exploration.
- Hoooman Majd, journalist, author, and commentator
- Hooshang Amirahmadi, academic and political analyst. Professor of the Edward J. Bloustein School of Planning and Public Policy at Rutgers University
- Hossein Khan Motamed, surgeon, founder of the Motamed Hospital in Tehran, Iran, and personal physician of Mohammad Reza Shah.
- Houchang Chehabi, historian, expert in Iranian studies at the Frederick S. Pardee School of Global Studies, Boston University, where he is professor of international relations and History
- Houman Younessi, researcher and educator in informatics, computer science, and molecular biology. Former research professor at the University of Connecticut;
- Houra Merrikh, microbiologist and a full professor at Vanderbilt University
- Huda Akil, Syrian American neuroscientist and medical researcher
- Huda Zoghbi, Lebanese American physician and medical researcher who discovered the genetic cause of the Rett syndrome
- Hunein Maassab, Syrian American professor of epidemiology and the inventor of the live attenuated influenza vaccine
- Ibrahim Abu-Lughod, former director of Graduate Studies at Northwestern University, father of Lila Abu-Lughod (Palestinian)
- Ibrahim Oweiss, Egyptian-American economist and Professor Emeritus at Georgetown University; coined the term "Petrodollar"
- Ihab Hassan, Egyptian-American literary theorist foundational to the study of postmodernism; professor at the University of Wisconsin–Milwaukee
- İlhan Aksay, professor, Princeton University
- Imad-ad-Dean Ahmad, teaches religion, science, and freedom at the University of Maryland, College Park; directs the Minaret of Freedom Institute (Palestinian)
- Iraj Bashiri, professor of history at the University of Minnesota specialist in the fields of Central Asian studies and Iranian studies
- Iraj Zandi, emeritus professor of systems, University of Pennsylvania
- Irene Ghobrial, Egyptian-American physician and professor at the Dana–Farber Cancer Institute and Harvard Medical School; multiple myeloma researcher
- Ismail al-Faruqi, philosopher, professor (Palestinian)
- Jaleh Daie, scientist, former professor of biology and department chairs at the University of Wisconsin-Madison and Rutgers University
- James Der Derian, Watson Institute professor of International Studies and Political Science at Brown University
- Jamshid Gharajedaghi, organizational theorist, management consultant, & adjunct professor of Systems thinking at Villanova University. B
- Janet Afary, author, feminist activist, and professor of Religious Studies at the University of California, Santa Barbara. (Iranian)
- Jasmin Moghbeli, NASA astronaut candidate of the class of 2017
- Jennifer Tour Chayes, mathematical physicist and theoretical computer scientist, and world renowned leading expert on the modeling & analysis of dynamically growing graphs. Founder, Technical Fellow, & Managing Director of Microsoft Research New England & Microsoft Research New York
- Joanne Chory, plant biologist and geneticist (Lebanese)
- John Ghazvinian, author, historian and former journalist. Associate Director of the Middle East Center at the University of Pennsylvania.
- John Shahidi, software developer and manager, brother of Sam
- Joseph Albert Kechichian, author
- Joseph E. Aoun, president of Northeastern University (Lebanese)
- Joseph Massad, professor at Columbia University known for his work on nationalism and sexuality in the Arab world (Palestinian)
- Josh Pahigian, professor of global humanities at the University of New England
- K. Aslihan Yener, University of Chicago archaeologist who uncovered a new source of Bronze Age Anatolian tin mines
- Kamal Sarabandi, professor of engineering at the University of Michigan
- Kambiz GhaneaBassiri, professor of religion at Reed College, and author of A History of Islam in America and Competing Visions of Islam in the United States.
- Kamran Eshraghian, electrical engineer, notable for his work on VLSI and CMOS VLSI design
- Kamran Talattof, Persian literature and Iranian culture; director of Persian Program University of Arizona
- Kamyar Abdi, archaeologist, former assistant professor in the Department of Anthropology, Dartmouth College (Iranian)
- Karam Soliman, Egyptian-American pharmacologist and Distinguished Professor at Florida A&M University
- Kareem El-Badry, Egyptian-American astrophysicist at the California Institute of Technology; discovered Gaia BH1, the nearest known black hole
- Kareem Mohamed Abu-Elmagd, Egyptian-American organ transplant surgeon at Case Western Reserve University; pioneer of intestinal transplantation
- Kathy Niakan, human developmental and stem cell biologist. In 2016, she became the first scientist in the world to gain regulatory approval to edit the genomes of human embryos for research.
- Kaveh Pahlavan, professor of computer and electrical engineering, professor of computer science, and director of the Center for Wireless Information Network Studies (CWINS) at the Worcester Polytechnic Institute
- Kawthar Zaki, Egyptian-American electrical engineer and professor emerita at the University of Maryland, College Park; microwave engineering
- Kayvan Najarian, associate professor of computer science, Virginia Commonwealth University
- Khaled Abou El Fadl, Egyptian-American Distinguished Professor in Islamic Law at the UCLA School of Law; leading authority on Shari'ah
- Khaled J. Saleh, Egyptian-American orthopaedic surgeon specializing in joint replacement surgery
- Kian Tajbakhsh, social scientist, urban planner, and professor of urban planning at Columbia University. One of the four Iranian-Americans falsely convicted and detained by the Iranian government in May 2007
- Laila Shereen Sakr, Egyptian-American digital media theorist and artist at the University of California, Santa Barbara; founder of the R-Shief digital lab
- Laleh Bakhtiar, author and translator of 25 books about Islam, many of which deal with Sufism. She is best known for her 2007 translation of the Qur'an, known as The Sublime Quran,
- Laleh Khalili, professor of Middle Eastern Politics at the School of Oriental and African Studies at the University of London. She also writes regularly for Iranian.com
- Laura Nader, cultural anthropologist (Lebanese)
- Leila Ahmed, Egyptian-American professor at Harvard Divinity School and foundational scholar in Islamic feminism; author of Women and Gender in Islam
- Leila Farsakh, professor of political science at the University of Massachusetts, Boston (Palestinian)
- Leonardo Alishan, professor of Persian and Comparative Literature at the University of Utah (1978–1997)
- Lila Abu-Lughod, professor of anthropology and women's and gender studies at Columbia University (Palestinian)
- Lotfi A. Zadeh, mathematician, computer scientist, and professor emeritus of computer science at the University of California, Berkeley; father of fuzzy logic and fuzzy sets
- M. Amin Arnaout, Lebanese American nephrologist and biologist
- M. Cherif Bassiouni, Egyptian-American emeritus professor of law at DePaul University and leading scholar of international criminal law
- M. R. Ghanoonparvar, professor emeritus of Persian and comparative literature at the faculty of Middle Eastern studies at the University of Texas, Austin
- M. Şükrü Hanioğlu, professor of Near Eastern studies, Princeton University
- Maha Ashour-Abdalla, Egyptian-American professor of physics and astronomy at UCLA; space plasma physics researcher
- Mahmoud ElSohly, Egyptian-American pharmacologist at the University of Mississippi; director of the Marijuana Research Project
- Mahmoud Sadri, professor of sociology at the Federation of North Texas Area Universities. His major interests are in religious, cultural & theoretical sociology, reform Islam and interfaith dialogue.
- Majd Kamalmaz, psychotherapist who has been illegally detained in Syria since 2017
- Majid Khadduri, academic and founder of the Paul H. Nitze School of Advanced International Studies Middle East Studies program (Iraqi)
- Majid M. Naini (مجید ناینی), Rumi scholar, computer scientist, former professor at University of Pennsylvania, writer on poetry, science, technology, and mysticism
- Manijeh Razeghi, Walter P. Murphy professor and director of the Center for Quantum Devices at Northwestern University, pioneer in semiconductors and optoelectronic devices.
- Manuchehr Shahrokhi, professor of Global Business-Finance at California State University; Founding Editor of Global Finance Journal; executive director of Global Finance Association
- Manuel Berberian, earth scientist, specializing in earthquake seismology, geophysics, archaeoseismology, and environmental geoscience
- Marjorie Housepian Dobkin (1922–2013), professor emerita of English at Barnard College.
- Mark A. Gabriel, Egyptian-American lecturer and author of books critical of Salafi Islam
- Mark Krikorian, executive director of Center for Immigration Studies
- Mark Saroyan, professor of Soviet studies at Harvard and UC Berkeley
- Mark Zandi, chief economist of Moody's Analytics
- Marty Makary, Egyptian-American surgeon and professor at the Johns Hopkins School of Medicine; bestselling author of The Price We Pay
- Mary Bishai, Egyptian-American physicist at Brookhaven National Laboratory; co-spokesperson of the Deep Underground Neutrino Experiment
- Mary-Jane Deeb, Egyptian-American Middle East expert and former Chief of the African and Middle Eastern Division at the Library of Congress
- Maryam Mirzakhani, Stanford University professor; first female winner of the Fields Medal
- Massoud Pedram, computer engineer known for his research in green computing, power optimization (EDA), low power electronics and design, and electronic design automation.
- Matthew Shenoda, Egyptian-American poet and university administrator; author of Somewhere Else and Tahrir Suite
- Medhat Haroun, Egyptian-American earthquake engineering expert and former Provost of the American University in Cairo
- Mehmet Toner, cryobiologist, professor of surgery at the Harvard Medical School, and professor of biomedical engineering at the Harvard-MIT Division of Health Sciences and Technology
- Mehran Kardar, physicist and professor of physics at MIT, and co-faculty at the New England Complex Systems Institute
- Mehran Sahami, professor and the associate chair for education in the Computer Science department at Stanford University. Robert and Ruth Halperin University Fellow in Undergraduate Education at Stanford.
- Mehrsa Baradaran, law professor specializing in banking law at University of Georgia
- Mehryar Mohri, professor of computer science at the Courant Institute of Mathematical Sciences at New York University. Specialist in machine learning, automata theory and algorithms, speech recognition and natural language processing
- Merve Kavakçı, George Washington University professor and former Fazilet Party Parliamentarian exiled from Turkey for violating the Public Head Scarf Ban
- Michael E. DeBakey, Lebanese American cardiovascular surgeon and researcher, 1963 Lasker Award laureate
- Michael Mina, Egyptian-American epidemiologist and immunologist formerly at Harvard T.H. Chan School of Public Health; advocate of rapid antigen testing during the COVID-19 pandemic
- Michel Barsoum, Egyptian-American materials scientist at Drexel University; known for MAX phases and MXenes
- Michel T. Halbouty, Lebanese American geologist and geophysicist; pioneer in oil field research
- Mina Bissell, scientist and biologist known for research on breast cancer; former head of life science at the Lawrence Berkeley National Laboratory
- Mine Çetinkaya-Rundel, associate professor of the practice in statistics at Duke University
- Minouche Shafik, Egyptian-American economist; former President of Columbia University, Director of the London School of Economics, and Deputy Governor of the Bank of England
- Mitch Daniels, president of Purdue University (Syrian)
- Moeness Amin, Egyptian-American professor at Villanova University; recipient of the IEEE Dennis J. Picard Medal
- Mohamed Abdou, Egyptian-American nuclear engineer and director of the Fusion Science and Technology Center
- Mohamed El-Genk, Egyptian-American Distinguished Professor of Nuclear Engineering at the University of New Mexico; space nuclear power expert
- Mohamed Fayad, Egyptian-American software engineering professor known for software patterns and software stability
- Mohamed Gad-el-Hak, Egyptian-American professor of biomedical engineering at Virginia Commonwealth University; author of The MEMS Handbook
- Mohamed Hashish, Egyptian-American mechanical engineer who invented the abrasive waterjet cutter
- Mohamed Noor, Egyptian-American geneticist and professor of biology at Duke University
- Mohammad Fadel, Egyptian-American law professor at the University of Toronto Faculty of Law; Islamic law and economics
- Mohammad Hajiaghayi, computer scientist known for his work in algorithms, game theory, network design, and big data. Jack and Rita G. Minker professor at the University of Maryland Dept. of Computer Science.
- Mohammad Jafar Mahjoub, Iranian scholar of Persian literature, essayist, translator, and professor. Moved to the US in 1991 and taught at the University of California, Berkeley
- Mohammad Javad Abdolmohammadi, John E. Rhodes Professor of Accounting at Bentley University since 1988. (Iranian)
- Mohammad S. Obaidat (Jordanian), computer science/engineering academic and scholar
- Mohammad Shahidehpour, Carl Bodine Distinguished Professor and chairman in the Electrical and Computer Engineering Department at Illinois Institute of Technology
- Mohammad Yeganeh, economist, former governor of the Central Bank of Iran (1973–1975), professor of economics at Columbia University (1980–1985)
- Mohammadreza Ghadiri, chemist and professor of chemistry at The Scripps Research Institute. Awarded the Feynman Prize in Nanotechnology in 1998
- Mohammed Adam El-Sheikh, executive director of the Fiqh Council of North America (Sudanese)
- Mohammed Albakry, Egyptian-American professor at Middle Tennessee State University and translator of contemporary Arabic literature
- Mohammed Salah Baouendi, was a Tunisian American mathematician. His research concerned partial differential equations and the theory of several complex variables
- Mohsen Milani, foreign policy analyst, and professor of politics at the University of South Florida
- Mohsen Mostafavi, architect and educator, dean and Alexander and Victoria Wiley Professor at the Harvard Graduate School of Design
- Mona Diab, Egyptian-American computer scientist and director of Carnegie Mellon University's Language Technologies Institute; natural language processing
- Mona N. Fouad, Egyptian-American physician and cancer disparity researcher at the University of Alabama at Birmingham; member of the National Academy of Medicine
- Mona Zaghloul, Egyptian-American professor of electrical and computer engineering at George Washington University; integrated circuits and MEMS
- Mootaz Elnozahy, Egyptian-American computer scientist, former IBM researcher and Dean at KAUST
- Morteza Gharib, Hans W. Liepmann Professor of Aeronautics and Bio-Inspired Engineering at Caltech.
- Morvarid Karimi, neurologist and medical researcher, specialist in neuroimaging of the pathophysiology of movement disorders. She was an assistant professor of Neurology in the Movement Disorders Section at Washington University School of Medicine in St. Louis, Missouri
- Mostafa Ammar, Egyptian-American Regents' Professor of Computer Science at Georgia Institute of Technology; ACM and IEEE Fellow
- Mostafa El-Sayed, Egyptian-American US National Medal of Science laureate; leading nanoscience researcher; known for the spectroscopy rule named after him, the El-Sayed rule
- Moungi Bawendi, is an American–Tunisian chemist. He is known for his advances in the chemical production of high-quality quantum dots. For this work, he was awarded the Nobel Prize in Chemistry in 2023.
- Mounir Laroussi, is a Tunisian-American scientist. He is known for his work in plasma science.
- Mourad Ismail, Egyptian-American mathematician at the University of Central Florida; expert in orthogonal polynomials and special functions
- Moustafa Bayoumi, Egyptian-American writer and professor of English at Brooklyn College; author of How Does It Feel to Be a Problem?
- Moustafa Youssef, Egyptian-American computer scientist and ACM/IEEE Fellow; pioneer in indoor location tracking
- Muhammad S. Eissa, Egyptian-American author and lecturer of Arabic at the University of Chicago
- Muhammad Sahimi, professor of chemical engineering and materials science and current NIOC chair in petroleum engineering at USC
- Muhsin Mahdi, Iraqi American Islamologist and Arabist.
- Munther A. Dahleh, professor and director at Massachusetts Institute of Technology (Palestinian)
- Nabih Youssef, Egyptian-American structural engineer and leader in seismic engineering; retrofit of Los Angeles City Hall
- Nada Shabout, art historian and professor of art history at University of North Texas (Palestinian-Iraqi)
- Nader Engheta, H. Nedwill Ramsey professor of electrical and systems engineering at the University of Pennsylvania. He has made pioneering contributions to the fields of metamaterials, transformation and plasmonic optics, nano- and graphene photonics, nano- and miniature antennas, and bio-inspired optical imaging, among many others
- Nader Pourmand, professor of biomolecular engineering at the Baskin School of Engineering
- Nader Tehrani, designer, Dean of the Irwin S. Chanin School of Architecture at Cooper Union, and former professor of architecture and department chair at the MIT School of Architecture and Planning.
- Nadia Abu El Haj, author and professor of anthropology at Barnard College and subject of a major tenure controversy case at Columbia University (Palestinian)
- Nadia Hijab, Journalist with Middle East Magazine and senior fellow at the Institute for Palestine Studies (Palestinian)
- Nagui Achamallah, Egyptian-American psychiatrist and painter
- Nagwa El-Badri, Egyptian-American immunologist and director of the Center of Excellence in Stem Cells and Regenerative Medicine
- Nahid Angha, Sufi scholar,. Co-director and co-founder of the International Association of Sufism (IAS), founder of the International Sufi Women Organization, and executive editor of the journal Sufism: An Inquiry
- Nariman Farvardin, president of Stevens Institute of Technology, and former provost of University of Maryland
- Naseer Aruri, chancellor professor of political science at University of Massachusetts, Dartmouth (Palestinian)
- Nasser Sharify, distinguished professor and dean emeritus of the School of Information and Library Science at Pratt Institute
- Nazli Choucri, Egyptian-American political scientist at MIT; international relations and cyberpolitics
- Negar Mottahedeh, cultural critic and film theorist
- Newsha Ajami, hydrologist specializing in urban water policy and sustainable water management; professor and director of Urban Water Policy program at Stanford University
- Nima Arkani-Hamed, theoretical physicist and professor at the Institute for Advanced Study in Princeton, New Jersey
- Noah McKay (born Nasser Talebzadeh Ordoubadi), physician and author of Wellness at Warp Speed
- Noha Radwan, Egyptian-American scholar of comparative literature at the University of California, Davis
- Norm Zada, former adjunct mathematics professor, and founder of Perfect 10; son of Lotfi A. Zadeh
- Noureddine Melikechi, Algerian American Atomic, Molecular, and Optical Physicist, member of the Mars Science Laboratory
- Nouriel Roubini, economist; professor of economics at the Stern School of Business, New York University
- Nur Yalman, octolingual Harvard University professor of social anthropology and Middle Eastern studies
- Omar M. Yaghi, Jordanian American reticular chemistry pioneer; winner of the 2018 Wolf Prize in Chemistry
- Omid Safi, professor of Asian and Middle Eastern studies at Duke University, director of the Duke Islamic Studies Center, and columnist for On Being. Scholar of Islamic mysticism (Sufism)
- Osman Yaşar, professor and chair of the computational science department at State University of New York College at Brockport
- Oussama Khatib, roboticist and professor of computer science
- Pardis Sabeti, computational geneticist, assistant professor, Center for Systems Biology and Department of Organismic and Evolutionary Biology, Harvard University
- Parviz Moin, fluid dynamicist, professor of mechanical engineering at Stanford University. 2011 inductee to the United States National Academy of Sciences
- Paul Boghossian, professor of philosophy at New York University
- Paul M. Naghdi, professor of mechanical engineering at the University of California, Berkeley. Specialist in continuum mechanics
- Payam Heydari, professor of electrical engineering and computer science, University of California, Irvine
- Peter Balakian, professor of humanities at Colgate University
- Peter Boghossian, professor of philosophy at Portland State University
- Philip Khuri Hitti, historian of Arab culture and history (Lebanese)
- Philip S. Khoury, Ford International professor of history and associate provost at the Massachusetts Institute of Technology (Lebanese)
- Raffi Indjejikian, professor of accounting at University of Michigan
- Ragui Assaad, Egyptian-American professor at the Humphrey School of Public Affairs, University of Minnesota
- Rahmat Shoureshi, former president of Portland State University; former president, provost and professor at New York Institute of Technology
- Ramez Elmasri, Egyptian-American computer scientist and co-author of widely used database textbooks
- Ramez Naam, Egyptian-American computer scientist, futurist, and science fiction author of the Nexus Trilogy; former Microsoft executive
- Ramin Jahanbegloo, philosopher at University of Toronto
- Ramzi Fawaz, Egyptian-American professor of English at the University of Wisconsin–Madison; author of The New Mutants: Superheroes and the Radical Imagination of American Comics
- Rania Awaad, Egyptian-American psychiatrist and Clinical Professor of Psychiatry at Stanford University; Muslim mental health
- Rashid Khalidi, Edward Said Professor of Modern Arab Studies at Columbia University (Palestinian-Lebanese)
- Rashid Massumi, cardiologist and clinical professor, best known for his pioneering research in the field of electrophysiology. He was also known for bringing modern cardiology to Iran, and for being the cardiologist to the last Shah of Iran and, until 1980, Ayatollah Khomeini
- Ray Takeyh, Middle East scholar and senior fellow at the Council on Foreign Relations
- Reda Mankbadi, Egyptian-American aeroacoustics specialist and former Dean of Engineering at Embry-Riddle Aeronautical University
- Reza Aslan, scholar of religious studies, television host, and author of No God but God: The Origins, Evolution, and Future of Islam and Zealot: The Life and Times of Jesus of Nazareth. Currently a professor of creative writing at University of California, Riverside. Board member of the National Iranian American Council (NAIC)
- Reza Hamzaee, economist and BOG-Distinguished Professor of Economics at Missouri Western State University. Specialist in banking and managerial economics
- Reza Olfati-Saber, roboticist and assistant professor of engineering at Dartmouth College
- Reza Zadeh, computer scientist at Stanford University
- Richard Danielpour, professor of composition, Manhattan School of Music
- Richard Dekmejian, professor at University of Southern California
- Richard G. Hovannisian, professor of Armenian History at UCLA
- Robert Khayat, chancellor of the University of Mississippi (Lebanese)
- Robert Mehrabian, president of Carnegie Mellon
- Robert Mehrabian, material scientist, former president of Carnegie Mellon University, and chair, president, and CEO of Teledyne Technologies
- Ronald Hamowy, Egyptian-American intellectual historian associated with libertarianism; professor emeritus at the University of Alberta
- Roozbeh Ghaffari, inventor, bioelectronics entrepreneur, biomedical engineering research faculty at Northwestern University
- Rosemarie Said Zahlan, historian, journalist, and author, sister of Edward Said (Palestinian-Lebanese)
- Roxanne Varzi, associate professor of anthropology and film and media studies at the University of California, Irvine, documentary filmmaker, and writer
- Roy Mottahedeh, Gurney Professor of History, Emeritus at Harvard University, specialist in pre-modern social and intellectual history of the Islamic Middle East. Former director of Harvard's Center for Middle Eastern Studies (1987–1990), and inaugural director of Harvard's Prince Alwaleed Bin Talal Islamic Studies Program (2005–2011)
- Rushdi Said, Egyptian-American geologist and author of The Geology of Egypt
- Saad Eddin Ibrahim, Egyptian-American sociologist and human rights activist; founder of the Ibn Khaldun Center for Development Studies
- Saad Z. Nagi, Egyptian-American sociologist whose disability framework influenced the Americans with Disabilities Act
- Saadi Simawe, translator, novelist and teacher (Iraqi)
- Saba Soomekh, professor of religious studies, women's studies, and Middle Eastern history at UCLA and Loyola Marymount University. Author of books and articles on contemporary and historical Persian Jewish culture
- Saba Valadkhan, biomedical scientist, assistant professor and RNA researcher at Case Western Reserve University, recipient of Young Scientist Award in 2005 for the mechanism of spliceosomes
- Saddeka Arebi, professor of anthropology at UC Berkeley (Libyan)
- Sadek Hilal, Egyptian-American Columbia University radiologist and pioneer in imaging science
- Safa Zaki, Egyptian-American cognitive scientist and sixteenth president of Bowdoin College
- Sahar Aziz, Egyptian-American Distinguished Professor of Law at Rutgers Law School; founder of the Center for Security, Race and Rights
- Saïd Amir Arjomand, professor of sociology at Stony Brook University, and director of the Stony Brook Institute of Global Studies. Founding editor of the Journal of Persianate Studies
- Said Ghabrial, Egyptian-American professor of plant pathology at the University of Kentucky; authority on mycoviruses
- Sakineh (Simin) M. Redjali, psychologist and author. She was the first female professor at the National University of Iran
- Sam Shahidi, software developer and manager, brother of John
- Sam Sofer, scientist who specializes in biological processes and bioreactor design.
- Samih Farsoun, sociology professor at the American University (Palestinian)
- Samih Farsoun, professor of sociology at American University and editor of Arab Studies Quarterly (Palestinian)
- Samira Kiani, health systems engineer at Arizona State University. Her work combines CRISPR technology with synthetic biology. She is a 2019 AAAS Leshner Fellow.
- Samuel Rahbar, biomedical scientist, discovered the linkage between HbA1C and diabetes
- Samy El-Shall, Egyptian-American endowed professor of chemistry at Virginia Commonwealth University; nanostructured materials and catalysis
- Sarafina Nance, Egyptian-American astrophysicist and science communicator at UC Berkeley
- Sattareh Farmanfarmaian, founder and director of the Tehran School of Social Work. Co-founder of the Family Planning Association of Iran, and former vice-president of the International Planned Parenthood Federation
- Seema Yasmin, director of the Stanford Health Communication Initiative at Stanford University
- Sepandar Kamvar, computer scientist, Stanford University
- Seyyed Hossein Nasr, professor of Islamic studies at George Washington University; prominent Islamic philosopher
- Shadia Habbal, Syrian American astronomer and physicist specialized in Space physics
- Shahinaz Gadalla, Egyptian-American physician-scientist and cancer epidemiologist at the National Cancer Institute
- Shahrbanou Tadjbakhsh, university lecturer at Sciences Po, researcher, and United Nations consultant in peacekeeping, conflict resolution, counter-terrorism and radicalization. Best known for her work in "Human Security"
- Shahriar Afshar, physicist and inventor who is the namesake of the Afshar experiment
- Shahrokh Shariat, urologist; professor & chairman of the Department of Urology of the Medical University of Vienna, Vienna, Austria; adjunct professor of urology and medical oncology at Weill Cornell Medical Center & at the University of Texas Southwestern Medical Center.
- Shaul Bakhash, historian, expert in Iranian studies, George Mason University, Clarence J. Robinson Professor of History
- Sherief Reda, Egyptian-American professor of engineering at Brown University; energy-efficient computing and electronic design automation
- Sherif Zaki, Egyptian-American pathologist and longtime Centers for Disease Control and Prevention infectious-disease expert (Ebola, Zika, COVID-19)
- Shireen Hunter, research professor at the Center for Muslim-Christian Understanding at Georgetown University.
- Siamack A. Shirazi, scientist, professor and graduate coordinator of the Mechanical Engineering department at the University of Tulsa.
- Sibel Edmonds, former translator who worked as a contractor for the Federal Bureau of Investigation (FBI); founder of the National Security Whistleblowers Coalition (NSWBC)
- Steven Salaita, former professor of English at Virginia Tech, winner of Myers Outstanding Book Award for the Study of Human Rights 2007 (Palestinian)
- Sussan Babaie, art historian and curator, specialist in Persian art and Islamic art of the early modern period.especially the Safavid dynasty
- Tahani Amer, Egyptian-American aerospace engineer and senior executive at NASA; NASA Exceptional Service Medal recipient
- Taher ElGamal, Egyptian-American cryptographer, inventor of the ElGamal discrete log cryptosystem and the ElGamal signature scheme
- Talal Asad, anthropologist at the CUNY Graduate Center. (Saudi Arabian)
- Taner Akçam, University of Minnesota professor, historian specializing in the Armenian genocide
- Tarek Abdelzaher, Egyptian-American computer scientist at the University of Illinois Urbana–Champaign; cyber-physical systems and the Internet of things
- Tarek El-Bawab, Egyptian-American telecommunications engineer and former editor-in-chief of IEEE Communications Magazine
- Tarek Masoud, Egyptian-American Ford Foundation Professor of Democracy and Governance at the Harvard Kennedy School; author of Counting Islam
- Tarek Omar Souryal, Egyptian-American orthopedic surgeon, former team doctor for the Dallas Mavericks
- Tarek Sobh, Egyptian-American engineer and president of Lawrence Technological University
- Thomas L. Saaty, Assyrian-Iraqi University Professor at the University of Pittsburgh
- Touraj Daryaee, Iranologist and historian at the University of California, Irvine
- Turgay Uzer, Georgia Institute of Technology physicist
- Vahid Tarokh, professor of electrical and computer engineering, Bass Connections Professor, a professor of mathematics (secondary), and computer science (secondary) at Duke University
- Vali Nasr, author and scholar on the Middle East and Islamic world; Served as Dean of the Johns Hopkins School of Advanced International Studies (SAIS) in Washington D.C.
- Vamık Volkan, Princeton University professor emeritus of psychiatry
- Vartan Gregorian, president of The Carnegie Corporation of New York and former president of Brown University
- Vartan Gregorian, former president of Brown University and current president of the Carnegie Corporation
- Viken Babikian, professor at Boston University School of Medicine
- Wafaa El-Sadr, Egyptian-American University Professor of Epidemiology and Medicine at Columbia University; founder of ICAP; MacArthur Fellowship recipient
- Wafik El-Deiry, Egyptian-American physician-scientist and director of the Legorreta Cancer Center at Brown University; discovered the p21 gene
- Waguih Ishak, Egyptian-American engineer, former chief technologist at Corning Inc. and adjunct professor at Stanford University
- Waleed El-Ansary, Egyptian-American scholar of comparative religion and Islamic economics at Xavier University
- Yahya Armajani, professor of history and soccer coach at Macalester College
- Yahya Rahmat-Samii, professor and the Northrop Grumman Chair in Electromagnetics at Electrical Engineering Department at UCLA
- Yaser Abu-Mostafa, Egyptian-American professor at Caltech; co-founder of the NeurIPS conference and author of Learning From Data
- Yasmine Belkaid, Algerian American immunologist, professor and a senior investigator at the National Institute of Allergy and Infectious Diseases
- Youssef Marzouk, Egyptian-American professor of aeronautics and astronautics at MIT; uncertainty quantification and Bayesian inference
- Zabihollah Rezaee, accountant, Thompson-Hill Chair of Excellence and professor of accounting at the University of Memphis
- Zakya Kafafi, Egyptian-American research fellow at Lehigh University; first woman to direct the National Science Foundation Division of Materials Research
- Zohra Aziza Baccouche, was an American physicist and science filmmaker.
- Zoubin Ghahramani, professor of information engineering at the University of Cambridge

=== Business ===
- Ahmass Fakahany, Egyptian-American chief executive of the Altamarea Group restaurant company
- Ahmed Zayat, Egyptian-American entrepreneur and racehorse owner of American Pharoah
- Ali Abdelaziz, Egyptian-American mixed martial arts manager and founder of Dominance MMA Management
- Allen Adham, Egyptian-American computer scientist and co-founder and first president of Blizzard Entertainment
- Amr Awadallah, Egyptian-American co-founder of Cloudera and former VP at Google
- Bob Miner, co-founder of Oracle Corporation and the producer of its relational database management system
- Charif Souki, Egyptian-American energy executive who founded Cheniere Energy and Tellurian Inc.; pioneer of US liquefied natural gas exports
- Christopher Sarofim, Egyptian-American businessman and fund manager, chairman of Fayez Sarofim & Co.
- Emil Michael, Egyptian-American former Chief Business Officer at Uber and technology advisor to the United States Department of Defense
- Fayez Sarofim, Egyptian-American billionaire fund manager, founder of Fayez Sarofim & Co., and part-owner of the Houston Texans
- Gamal Aziz, Egyptian-American hospitality executive, former president of Wynn Macau and COO of Wynn Resorts
- Hany Rashwan, Egyptian-American technology entrepreneur and co-founder of Amun and 21Shares
- John J. Mack, CEO of investment bank Morgan Stanley (Lebanese parents)
- Joseph Lubin (entrepreneur), Canadian-American founder of blockchain software technology company ConsenSys, co-founder of Ethereum
- Mario Kassar, formerly headed Carolco Pictures (Lebanese)
- Melih Abdulhayoğlu, founder, CEO, and president of Comodo Group
- Michael Mina, Egyptian-American Michelin-starred chef and restaurateur; founder of the Mina Group
- Mo Gawdat, Egyptian-American former Chief Business Officer of Google X and author of Solve for Happy
- Mohamed El-Erian, Egyptian-American economist, former CEO of PIMCO, President of Queens' College, Cambridge, and Chief Economic Advisor at Allianz
- Najeeb Halaby, former head of Federal Aviation Administration and CEO of Pan-American Airlines, and father of Queen Noor of Jordan (Lebanese-Syrian father)
- Peter Mallouk, Egyptian-American billionaire founder of Creative Planning and owner of Sporting Kansas City
- Rana el Kaliouby, Egyptian-American computer scientist and co-founder of Affectiva; pioneer of Emotion AI
- Roger Tamraz, Egyptian-American international banker and venture capital investor; chairman of NetOil
- Sadek Wahba, Egyptian-American economist and founder of I Squared Capital
- Sam Gores, founder of talent agency Paradigm Agency; on the Forbes list of billionaires (LebanesePalestinian)
- Sharif El-Gamal, Egyptian-American real estate developer, chairman and CEO of Soho Properties; known for the proposed Park51 project
- Sina Tamaddon, senior vice president of applications for Apple Computer
- Steve Jobs, co-founder and CEO of Apple (Syrian father)
- Will Ahmed, Egyptian-American founder and CEO of WHOOP

=== Literature ===
- Abdi Nazemian, author and screenwriter. Best known for The Walk-In Closet
- Abraham Rihbany, writer on politics and religion
- Ahmed Zaki Abu Shadi, Egyptian-American Romantic poet, publisher, physician, and bee scientist
- Alicia Erian, Egyptian-American novelist, author of The Brutal Language of Love and Towelhead
- Ameen Rihani, "father of Arab American literature", member of the New York Pen League and author of The Book of Khalid, the first Arab American novel in English; also an ambassador
- André Aciman, Egyptian-American writer, author of Call Me by Your Name and the memoir Out of Egypt
- Andrew David Urshan, evangelist and author. Known as the "Persian Evangelist", ks
- Anzia Yezierska, novelist
- Azadeh Moaveni, author of Lipstick Jihad and co-author of Iran Awakening with Shirin Ebadi, and reporter for Time magazine on Iran and the Middle East
- Azar Nafisi, writer, best known for Reading Lolita in Tehran: A Memoir in Books
- Carole Naggar, Egyptian-American poet and photography historian
- Catherine Filloux, French-Algerian-American playwright
- Claire Messud, author, Algerian
- Colet Abedi, young adult novelist and television producer
- Dalia Sofer, writer, best known for The Septembers of Shiraz
- Diana Abu-Jaber, novelist and professor, author of Arabian Jazz and Crescent (Jordanian)
- Dina Nayeri, novelist, essayist, and short story writer. Author of A Teaspoon of Earth and Sea and Refuge
- Dora Levy Mossanen, author of historical fiction
- Ed Lacy (Ed Lacy), novelist
- Edward Said, literary theorist, thinker, and the founder of the academic field of postcolonial studies (Palestinian)
- Elia Abu Madi, poet, publisher and member of the New York Pen League (Lebanese)
- Elmaz Abinader, poet, playwright, memoirist, writer (Lebanese)
- Etel Adnan, poet, essayist, and visual artist (Syrian father)
- Ezzat Goushegir, fiction writer & playwright
- Faranak Margolese, writer, best known as author of Off the Derech
- Farnoosh Moshiri, novelist, playwright, and librettist. Professor of creative writing and literature at the University of Houston-Downtown
- Fereydoon Batmanghelidj, writer of books on health and wellness.
- Firoozeh Dumas, author of Funny in Farsi: A Memoir of Growing Up Iranian in America
- FM-2030, author, teacher, transhumanist philosopher, futurist; author of Are You a Transhuman?: Monitoring and Stimulating Your Personal Rate of Growth in a Rapidly Changing World (1989)
- Ghazal Omid, nonfiction political writer, nonfiction children's book writer, speaker, NGO executive
- Gina Nahai, author of Cry of the Peacock, Moonlight on the Avenue of Faith, and Caspian Rain
- Hakob Karapents, novelist and short story writer whose works were written in both Armenian and English. Settled in the US in 1947.
- Herman Wouk, novelist and non-fiction writer
- Huda Fahmy, Egyptian-American graphic novelist; Huda F Cares? was a National Book Award for Young People's Literature finalist
- Jack Marshall, poet and author (Iraqi father/Syrian mother)
- Jasmin Darznik, author of The Good Daughter: A Memoir of My Mother's Hidden Life and Song of a Captive Bird
- Kareem James Abu-Zeid, Egyptian-American translator of contemporary Arabic poetry and literature
- Kaveh Akbar, poet and scholar
- Khaled Mattawa, poet, recipient of an Academy of American Poets award
- Khalil Gibran, writer, poet, and member of the New York Pen League; the third-best-selling poet of all time (Lebanese)
- Laila Lalami, Pulitzer Prize-nominated novelist, journalist, essayist, and professor (Moroccan)
- Laleh Bakhtiar, writer and scholar
- Laleh Khadivi, novelist and documentary filmmaker
- Lawrence Joseph, poet
- Lisa Suhair Majaj, poet and literary scholar
- Lucette Lagnado, Egyptian-American The Wall Street Journal journalist and author of The Man in the White Sharkskin Suit
- Mahbod Seraji, writer, best known for Rooftops of Tehran
- Mahmoud Seraji, a.k.a. "M.S. Shahed," poet best known for his trilogy Mazamir Eshgh (مزامیر عشق). Father of Mahbod Seraji
- Mahtob Mahmoody, author of autobiographical memoir My Name is Mahtob and daughter of Betty Mahmoody, the author of Not Without My Daughter
- Marsha Mehran, novelist, author of international bestsellers Pomegranate Soup (2005) and Rosewater and Soda Bread (2008)
- Melody Moezzi, writer, attorney, and author of Haldol and Hyacinths: A Bipolar Life and War on Error: Real Stories of American Muslims.
- Mikhail Naimy, Nobel Prize-nominated author; member of the New York Pen League; well-known works include The Book of Mirdad (Lebanese)
- Mona Simpson, author of Anywhere but Here (Syrian father)
- Najmieh Batmanglij, acclaimed chef and cookbook author
- Naomi Shihab Nye, poet
- Neda Soltani, writer of My Stolen Face and political exile
- Ottessa Moshfegh, writer, author of Eileen
- Parvin Darabi, writer and women's rights activist. Best known for book Rage Against the Veil
- Pauls Toutonghi, Egyptian-American writer, author of Red Weather, Evel Knievel Days, and Dog Gone
- Porochista Khakpour, novelist, essayist, and writer
- Rachel Wahba, Egyptian-American writer and psychotherapist focused on Mizrahi and Sephardic Jewish identity
- Randa Jarrar, Egyptian-American novelist, essayist, and translator
- Roya Hakakian, writer, poet, and journalist
- Sabah Khodir, Egyptian-American poet and activist
- Saïd Sayrafiezadeh, memoirist, playwright, and fiction writer
- Saladin Ahmed, Egyptian-American Eisner Award-winning comic book writer and fantasy author of Throne of the Crescent Moon
- Salar Abdoh, novelist and essayist. Current director of the graduate program in creative writing at the City College of New York.
- Samuel John Hazo, State Poet of Pennsylvania
- Sara Farizan, writer of young adult literature. Best known for novel, If You Could Be Mine (2013)
- Shahrnoosh Parsipour, writer
- Sharifa Yazmeen, Egyptian-American playwright and theatre director; inaugural winner of the Barbara Whitman Award
- Shokooh Mirzadegi, novelist and poet, who worked for Ferdowsi magazine and Kayhān daily in the late 1960s in Iran.
- Sholeh Wolpe, poet, editor and literary translator
- Solmaz Sharif, poet, known for her debut poetry collection, Look. Currently a Jones Lecturer at Stanford University
- Stephen Adly Guirgis, Egyptian-AmericanPulitzer Prize-winning playwright
- Steven Naifeh, Pulitzer Prize-winning biographer of Jackson Pollock and Vincent van Gogh, co-author of 18 other books with Gregory White Smith, businessman, and artist
- Steven Salaita, expert on comparative literature and post-colonialism, writer, activist (Palestinian/Jordanian)
- Suheir Hammad, poet, playwright, artist, Tony Award winner, 2003 (Russel Simmons Presents Def Poetry Jam on Broadway)
- Suleika Jaouad, is a writer, advocate, and motivational speaker. She is the author of the "Life, Interrupted" column in The New York Times
- Susan Atefat Peckham, poet
- Tahereh Mafi, novelist of young adult fiction
- Victor Hassine, Egyptian-American attorney and author of Life Without Parole on prison reform
- Walter Abish, novelist, poet, and short story writer
- William D. S. Daniel, Iranian-Assyrian author, poet, and musician
- William Peter Blatty, American writer best known for his 1971 horror novel The Exorcist (Lebanese)
- Yasmin Mogahed, Egyptian-American author, educator, and Muslim speaker
- Yussef El Guindi, Egyptian-American playwright of Back of the Throat and Pilgrims Musa and Sheri in the New World

=== Politics ===
- Abbas Farzanegan, former governor of the state of Esfahan, communications minister and diplomat during Mohammad Reza Pahlavi's reign. Key figure in facilitation of the 1953 Iranian coup d'état. Immigrated to the US in 1975
- Abdul El-Sayed, Egyptian-American physician and public-health official; 2018 Michigan gubernatorial candidate and 2026 U.S. Senate candidate
- Abdullah Entezam, Iranian diplomat, Iranian ambassador to France (1927) and to West Germany, secretary of the Iranian embassy in the United States. Father of Hume Horan
- Abraham Kazen, US Congressman (D-Texas) (1967–1985) (Lebanese ancestry)
- Adam Benjamin, Jr., Democrat, Indiana (1977–1982)
- Adrin Nazarian, Member of the California State Assembly from the 46th district. First Iranian-American elected to the California State Legislature
- Ahmad Madani, former commander of the Imperial Iranian Navy (1979), governor of the Khuzestan province, and candidate of the first Iranian presidential election. After his exile to the United States in 1980, he was the chairman of the National Front outside of Iran.
- Ahsha Safaí, elected member of the San Francisco Board of Supervisors representing Supervisorial District 11
- Alan Khazei, social entrepreneur; founder and CEO of "Be The Change, Inc", dedicated to building coalitions among non-profit organizations and citizen . Co-founder and former CEO of City Year, an AmeriCorps national service program
- Alex Azar, Secretary of Human Health and Service (2018–2021) (Lebanese)
- Alex Nowrasteh, immigration policy analyst currently at the Center for Global Liberty and Prosperity at the Cato Institute, and previously at the Competitive Enterprise Institute. He is a national expert on immigration policy
- Ali Shakeri, activist and businessman. Serves on the Community Advisory Board of the Center for Citizen Peacebuilding at the University of California, Irvine, and is the founder and active member of Ettehade Jomhourikhahan-e Iran (EJI), which advocates for a democratic and secular republic in Iran. He was one of the four Iranian-Americans detained by the Iranian government in May 2007.
- Allan Mansoor, Egyptian-American Republican former member of the California State Assembly and Mayor of Costa Mesa
- Amir Hatem Mahdy Ali, Egyptian-American United States district judge for the United States District Court for the District of Columbia
- Amr Hamzawy, Egyptian-American political scientist and former member of the Egyptian parliament
- Andrew S. Boutros, Egyptian-American lawyer and United States Attorney for the Northern District of Illinois
- Anna Eshoo, US Representative of California's 18th congressional district
- Anna Eshoo, Democrat, California (1993–2013)
- Anna Eskamani, member of the Florida House of Representatives
- Anna Kaplan (née Anna Monahemi), first Iranian American elected to New York State Senate
- Anthony Brindisi, Democrat, New York (2019–2021)
- Aya Hijazi, Egyptian-American social activist and co-founder of the Belady Foundation
- Azadeh N. Shahshahani, human rights attorney
- Azita Raji, former US ambassador to Sweden appointed by Barack Obama
- Bijan Kian, businessman, member of the board of directors of the Export–Import Bank of the United States, partner of Michael Flynn in the Flynn Intel Group, and worked with the first Trump administration transition team in regards to the Office of the Director of National Intelligence
- Bob Yousefian, former mayor of Glendale, California
- Brad Avakian, commissioner of the Oregon Bureau of Labor and Industries (2008–2019)
- Brigitte Gabriel, pro-Israel activist and founder of the American Congress For Truth (Lebanese)
- Charles Boustany, US Representative from Louisiana; cousin of Victoria Reggie Kennedy (Lebanese)
- Chip Pashayan, Republican, California (1979–1991)
- Chris John, US Congressman (D-Louisiana) (1997–2005) (Lebanese ancestry)
- Chris Sununu, Governor of New Hampshire (R) (2017–), son of Governor John H. Sununu
- Cyrus Amir-Mokri, former Assistant Secretary of the Treasury for Financial Institutions at the U.S. Treasury Department
- Cyrus Habib, 16th Lieutenant Governor of Washington, and president of the Washington State Senate. First and so far only Iranian American elected to state office
- Cyrus Mehri, attorney and partner at Mehri & Skalet. Best known for helping establish the National Football League's (NFL) Rooney Rule
- Dalia Mogahed, Egyptian-American researcher, former advisor to President Barack Obama; Director of Research at the Institute for Social Policy and Understanding
- Darin LaHood, US Congressman (R-Illinois) (born 2015), son of Ray Lahood
- Darrell Issa, US Congressman (R-California) (2001–) (Lebanese father)
- David Nahai, environmental attorney, political activist, former head of the Los Angeles Department of Water and Power
- David Safavian, disgraced former chief of staff of the United States General Services Administration
- Dickran Tevrizian, United States District Court for the Central District of California (1985–2005)
- Dina Powell, Egyptian-American US Deputy National Security Advisor for Strategy (2017–2018)
- Donna Shalala, U.S. Secretary of Health and Human Services (1993–2001) (Lebanese parents)
- Esha Momeni, women's rights activist and a member of the One Million Signatures campaign
- Eugene Dooman, counselor at the United States Embassy in Tokyo during the period of critical negotiations between the US and Japan before World War II
- Farah Pahlavi, widow of Mohammad Reza Shah and former shahbanu (empress) of Iran
- Farajollah Rasaei, Commander of the Imperial Iranian Navy (1961–1972), the most Senior Naval Commander of the Iranian Navy. Exiled to the US after the 1979 revolution
- Farhad Sepahbody, former ambassador of Iran to Morocco (1976–1979). Exiled to the US after the Iranian Revolution
- Farrah Chaichi, Oregon state representative
- Faryar Shirzad, former Deputy National Security Advisor and White House Deputy Assistant for International Economic Affairs to President George W. Bush
- Fereydoon Hoveyda, former Iranian ambassador to the United Nations (1971–1979). Since his exile to the U.S., senior fellow and member of the executive committee of the National Committee on American Foreign Policy (NCAFP)
- Ferial Govashiri, served as the personal secretary to U.S. President Barack Obama at the White House (2014–2017). Currently is the chief of staff to the chief content officer of Netflix
- Gamal Helal, Egyptian-American senior diplomatic interpreter who served four U.S. presidents
- George Deukmejian, 35th governor of California, 27th attorney general of California, member of the California State Senate (1967–1979) and State Assembly (1963–1967)
- George Helmy, Egyptian-American former U.S. Senator from New Jersey and Chief of Staff to Governor Phil Murphy
- George J. Mitchell, US Senator (D-Maine) (1980–1995) United States of America special envoy to the Middle East under the Obama administration, US Senator from Maine, Senate Majority Leader (Lebanese mother)
- George Joulwan, retired general, former NATO commander-in-chief (Lebanese)
- George Kasem, US Congressman (D-California) (1959–1961)
- Gholam Reza Azhari, military leader and Prime Minister of Iran (1978–1979). Immigrated to the US in 1979
- Goli Ameri, former Under Secretary General for Humanitarian Values and Diplomacy for the International Federation of Red Cross and Red Crescent Societies, former US Assistant Secretary of State for Educational and Cultural Affairs, former US public delegate to the United Nations General Assembly, and former Republican candidate for the United States House of Representatives from the 1st district of Oregon.
- Hady Amr, Deputy Assistant Secretary for Israeli-Palestinian Affairs and Press and Public Diplomacy (2021-), founding director of Brookings Doha Center (Lebanese father)
- Hajj Sayyah, first Iranian to obtain an American citizenship, world traveler, and political activist. Played a major role in the Persian Constitutional Revolution of 1906.
- Hume Horan, diplomat and former US ambassador to Cameroon, Equatorial Guinea, Sudan, Saudi Arabia, and the Ivory Coast. Son of Abdullah Entezam
- Hushang Ansary, former Iranian Minister of Economic Affairs and Finance, former ambassador of Iran to the US (1967–1969) and chairman of National Finance Committee of Bush-Cheney 2004 campaign.
- Ismael Ahmed, Egyptian-American co-founder of ACCESS and former director of the Michigan Department of Human Services
- Jackie Speier, Democrat, California (2008–)
- Jafar Sharif-Emami, former prime minister of Iran (1960–1961, 1978–1979), former president of the Iranian Senate (1964–1978), and former Minister of Foreign Affairs of Iran (1960). Exiled to the US in the wake of the Iranian Revolution
- James Abdnor, US Senator (R-South Dakota) (1981–1987)
- James Abourezk, US Senator (D-South Dakota) (1973–1979) (Lebanese ancestry)
- James Jabara, colonel and Korean War flying ace (Lebanese)
- James Zogby (Lebanese), founder and president of the Arab American Institute
- Jamie Zahlaway Belsito, former member of the Massachusetts House of Representatives. Moderator for the Town of Topsfield. Founder and Policy Director of the Maternal Mental Health Leadership Alliance.
- Jamshid Amouzegar, economist and politician who served as Prime Minister of Iran (1977–1978). Immigrated to the US in 1978
- Jeanine Pirro, former Westchester County District Attorney and New York Republican attorney general candidate (Lebanese parents)
- Jill Kelley, global advocate and American socialite (Lebanese)
- Jimmy Delshad, former mayor of Beverly Hills, California (2007–2008, 2010–2011), first Iranian-born mayor of an American city
- Jimmy Naifeh, Speaker of the Tennessee House of Representatives (D) (Lebanese ancestry)
- Joe Jamail, Renown American trial lawyer and billionaire, also known as the "King of Torts" (Lebanese)
- Joe Simitian, member of the Santa Clara County Board of Supervisors (2013-)
- John Abizaid, retired general (Lebanese)
- John Baldacci, Governor of Maine (D) (2003–2011) (Lebanese mother)
- John E. Sununu, US Senator (R-New Hampshire) (2003–2009) (father is of Lebanese and Palestinian ancestry)
- John E. Sweeney, Republican, New York (1999–2007)
- John H. Sununu, Governor of New Hampshire (R) (1983–1989) and chief of staff to George H. W. Bush (Lebanese and Palestinian ancestry)
- John J. Nimrod, minority rights activist and Illinois state senator of District 4 (1973–1983) of Iranian-Assyrian descent; notable for his promotion of Assyrian causes and for the rights of other under-represented minority groups throughout the world, such as Uyghurs and Tibetans
- Johnny Khamis, Councilmember from San Jose (Lebanese)
- Julia Tashjian, Secretary of the State of Connecticut (1983–1991)
- Justin Amash, US Representative (R-Michigan) (2011–2021), Palestinian and Syrian descent
- Kamal Habibollahi, last commander of the Imperian Iranian Navy until the Iranian Revolution and the last CNO commander of the Pahlavi dynasty. Also held several minister positions under the military government of Gholam Reza Azhari in 1978. Immigrated to the US after the Iranian Revolution
- Karim Sanjabi, Iranian politician of the National Front of Iran. Settled in the US after the 1979 revolution
- Lisa Halaby (a.k.a. Queen Noor), Queen-consort of Jordan and wife of King Hussein of Jordan (father is of Syrian descent)
- Mahnaz Afkhami, women's rights activist who served in the Cabinet of Iran from 1976 to 1978; executive director of the Washington-based Foundation for Iranian Studies, and the founder and president of the Women's Learning Partnership (WLP)
- Makan Delrahim, United States Assistant Attorney General for the United States Department of Justice Antitrust Division under the Trump Administration
- Mariam Memarsadeghi, democracy and human rights advocate
- Mark Esper, 27th Secretary of Defense (2019–2020) (Lebanese)
- Marvin R. Baxter, associate justice of the Supreme Court of California (1991–2015)
- Mary Rose Oakar, US Congresswoman (D-Ohio) (1977–1993)
- Mary-Katherine Stone, Egyptian-American Democratic member of the Vermont House of Representatives
- Mehdi Khalaji, political analyst, writer, and scholar of Shia Islamic studies. Senior research fellow at the Washington Institute for Near East Policy, a D.C.-based foreign policy think tank. He has frequently contributed to journalistic outlets such as BBC, The Guardian, The Washington Post, and The New York Times
- Mehdi Shahbazi, political activist and businessman. He was known for protest against major oil companies at the grounds of his Shell Oil gas station franchises
- Mehrdad Pahlbod, Iranian royal and first culture minister of Iran (1964–1968). He was the second husband of Princess Shams Pahlavi. Immigrated to the US and resided in Los Angeles after the 1979 revolution
- Michael Benjamin, 1996 Republican candidate for the US House from the 8th district of New York, and 2004 US Senate Republican Primary candidate from New York
- Mo Elleithee, Egyptian-American Democratic political campaign strategist
- Mohammad Hassan Mirza II, last Crown Prince of Iran from the rule of the Qajar dynasty & heir apparent to the Qajar Sun Throne. Currently lives in Dallas, Texas.
- Mohsen Sazegara, pro-democracy political activist and journalist. He held several offices in the government of Mir-Hossein Mousavi. His reformist policies clashed with the Supreme Leader Ali Khamenei, eventually resulting in his arrest and later exile. He currently resides in the US.
- Nancy Okail, Egyptian-American democracy advocate and human-rights activist
- Nazli Sabri, Egyptian-American first queen consort of the Kingdom of Egypt (1919–1936), wife of King Fuad I
- Nick Rahall, US Congressman (D-West Virginia) (1977–2015) (Lebanese ancestry)
- Noraladin Pirmoazzen, Iranian politician who served as a member of the 6th and 7th Islamic Consultative Assembly from the electorate of Ardabil, Nir, Namin and Sareyn. Immigrated to the US in 2008.
- Ollie Mohamed, President pro tempore of the Mississippi State Senate (1992) (Lebanese ancestry)
- Pantea Beigi, human rights advocate, known for her media appearances commenting on the human rights conditions in Iran in the wake of the 2009 Iranian presidential election protests. She has served as an AmeriCorps member for the PeaceJam foundation, notably working with Dr. Shirin Ebadi in her efforts to address social and economic injustices of the youth in Iran
- Parry Aftab, Internet privacy and security lawyer, considered one of the founders of cyberlaw. Founder of the cybersafety organizations WiredSafety, StopCyberbullying and the consulting firm, WiredTrust
- Parviz Sabeti, former SAVAK deputy under the regime of Mohammad Reza Shah. One of the most powerful men in the last two decades of the Pahlavi regime. Exiled to the US in 1979.
- Pat Danner, US Congresswoman (D-Mo.) (1993–2001)
- Paul Larudee, political activist and a major figure in the pro-Palestinian movement. He is involved in the International Solidarity Movement and the founder of the Free Gaza Movement and the Free Palestine Movement
- Philip Charles Habib, Under Secretary of State for Political Affairs and Special Envoy to Ronald Reagan (Lebanese)
- Prince Abdul Reza Pahlavi, son of Reza Shah and half-brother of Mohammad Reza Pahlavi. Immigrated to the US with other relatives immediately prior to the Islamic revolution of 1979
- Prince Ali-Reza Pahlavi, younger son of Mohammad Reza Pahlavi and Farah Pahlavi. He was second in the order of succession to the Iranian throne prior to the Iranian revolution.
- Princess Ashraf Pahlavi, twin sister of Mohammad Reza Pahlavi. Considered to be the "power behind her brother" and instrumental in the 1953 coup d'état which led him taking the throne. Served her brother as a Palace advisor and a strong advocate for women's rights.
- Princess Farahnaz Pahlavi, eldest daughter of Mohammad Reza Pahlavi and Farah Pahlavi. Currently resides in New York City
- Rachel Kaprielian, Massachusetts Registrar of Motor Vehicles (2008–2014); Massachusetts Secretary of Labor and Worforce Development
- Ralph Nader, politician and consumer advocate, author, lecturer, and attorney, candidate for US Presidency
- Ramin Toloui, Assistant Secretary for International Finance, United States Department of the Treasury
- Rana Abdelhamid, Egyptian-American political candidate and community organizer; founder of Hijabis of New York and Malikah
- Ray LaHood, US Congressman (R-Illinois) (1995–2009), U.S. Secretary of Transportation (2009–2013) (Lebanese and Jordanian ancestry)
- Reza Pahlavi, Crown Prince of Iran, last heir apparent of the Imperial State of Iran and current head of the exiled House of Pahlavi. Oldest son of Mohammad Reza Pahlavi and Farah Pahlavi. Founder and former leader of the National Council of Iran. Currently resides in Bethesda, Maryland.
- Robert Mardian, United States Assistant Attorney General (1970–1972)
- Roozbeh Aliabadi, advisor and commentator on geopolitical risk and geoeconomics. Current partner at global affair practice at GGA in New York City, former senior advisor to the Department of Strategic Initiatives, Ministry of Foreign Affairs in Iran
- Rosemary Barkett, US federal judge and the first woman Supreme Court Justice and Chief Justice for the state of Florida (Syrian)
- Ross Mirkarimi, former member of San Francisco City Council and former San Francisco Sheriff. Co-founder of the Green Party of California
- Rostam Giv, 3rd representative of Iranian Zoroastrians in Iranian parliament, senator of the Iranian Senate, and philanthropist to the Zoroastrian community in Iran, then United States, and the world. Immigrated to the US in 1978.
- Selwa Roosevelt (Lebanese), former Chief of Protocol of the United States and wife of the late Archibald Bulloch Roosevelt, Jr., grandson of President Theodore Roosevelt
- Shaban Jafari, Iranian political figure, practitioner of Pahlevani and zoorkhaneh rituals. Key figure in the facilitation of the 1953 Iranian coup d'état. Exiled to the United States soon after the 1979 revolution
- Shahram Homayoun, political dissident of the government of the Islamic Republic of Iran, and owner of "Channel One," a Persian satellite TV station based in Los Angeles that broadcasts into Iran daily
- Shams Pahlavi, elder sister of Mohammad Reza Pahlavi. Former president of the Red Lion and Sun Society. Exiled to the United States after the 1979 revolution
- Shamsi Hekmat, women's rights activist who pioneered reforms in women's status in Iran. Founded the first Iranian Jewish women's organization (Sazman Banovan Yahud i Iran) in 1947. After her migration to the US, she established the Iranian Jewish Women's Organization of Southern California.
- Shayan Modarres, civil right activist known for his representation of the family of Trayvon Martin, and a 2014 Democratic primary candidate for the US House from the 10th district of Florida
- Shereef Elnahal, Egyptian-American physician, former commissioner of the New Jersey Department of Health and U.S. Under Secretary of Veterans Affairs for Health
- Sherrie Mikhail Miday, Egyptian-American judge on the Cuyahoga County Court of Common Pleas; first Egyptian-American elected judge in the U.S.
- Shireen Ghorbani, at-large member of the Salt Lake County Council, representing 1.1 million residents
- Soraya Serajeddini, Iranian-Kurdish human rights activist. Former executive vice president of the Kurdish National Congress of North America.
- Spencer Abraham, U.S. Secretary of Energy (2001–2005) and U.S. Senator (R-Mich.) Secretary of Energy under Bush (1995–2001) (Lebanese ancestry)
- Steven Derounian, Republican, New York (1953–1965)
- Steven Mnuchin, 77th secretary of Treasury (2017–2021)
- Trita Parsi, founder and current president of the National Iranian American Council. He regularly writes articles and appears on TV to comment on foreign policy
- Troy Eid, Egyptian-American attorney and former United States Attorney for the District of Colorado
- Vali Nasr, Shia scholar and poetical scientist. Senior Fellow in foreign policy at the Brookings Institution
- Victor G. Atiyeh, Governor of Oregon (R) (1979–1987) (Syrian)
- Victoria Reggie Kennedy, attorney and widow of late Senator Ted Kennedy (Lebanese)
- Wael Ghonim, Egyptian-American pro-democracy activist and administrator of the "We are all Khaled Said" page that helped spark the Egyptian Revolution of 2011
- William Barr, Attorney General (2019–2021)
- Yasmine Pahlavi, lawyer and wife of Reza Pahlavi, Crown Prince of Iran. Co-founder and former director of the Foundation for the Children of Iran. Currently resides in Bethesda, Maryland
- Zahra Karinshak, attorney and politician.
- Zainab Salbi, co-founder and president of Women for Women International (Iraqi)

=== Arts and entertainment ===
- Ahmed Ahmed, Egyptian-American actor and comedian, co-founder of the Axis of Evil Comedy Tour
- Aja, Egyptian-American rapper and drag queen known for RuPaul's Drag Race
- Alexander D'Arcy, Egyptian-American film actor
- Ali Selim, Egyptian-American film and television director
- André Hakim, Egyptian-American Hollywood film producer (Mr. Belvedere Rings the Bell)
- Asaad Kelada, Egyptian-American television director of Who's the Boss?, The Facts of Life, and Family Ties
- Basil Gogos, Egyptian-American illustrator known for movie-monster covers of Famous Monsters of Filmland
- Bobby Chinn, Egyptian-American chef, television presenter, and judge on Top Chef Middle East
- C. K. Alexander, Egyptian-American actor, director, composer, and playwright
- Charlotte Wassef, Egyptian-American beauty queen, Miss Egypt and Miss Universe 1935
- Christopher Maher, Egyptian-American actor (Men in Black) turned James Beard Foundation Award-recognized chef
- Deana Haggag, Egyptian-American arts leader, former President and CEO of United States Artists
- Diane Tuckman, Egyptian-American silk artist and co-founder of Silk Painters International
- Dina Amer, Egyptian-American film director of You Resemble Me
- Dina Hashem, Egyptian-American stand-up comedian and Emmy-nominated writer for The Daily Show
- Dora Khayatt, Egyptian-American painter of portraits, landscapes, and seascapes
- Fouad Said, Egyptian-American film producer, cinematographer, and inventor of the Cinemobile
- Frank Agrama, Egyptian-American director and producer, founder of Harmony Gold USA and creative force behind Robotech
- Ghada Amer, Egyptian-American artist known for embroidered paintings addressing gender and sexuality
- Hadji Ali, Egyptian-American vaudeville performer known for controlled regurgitation acts
- Heba Amin, Egyptian-American visual artist known for the subversive graffiti action on the set of Homeland
- Hesham Issawi, Egyptian-American writer and director of AmericanEast and Cairo Exit
- Iman Le Caire, Egyptian-American dancer, actress, choreographer, and LGBTQ activist
- Jehane Noujaim, Egyptian-American Academy Award-nominated documentary director of The Square and Control Room
- Joe DeRosa, Egyptian-American stand-up comedian and actor (Dr. Caldera on Better Call Saul)
- Jonathan Roumie, Egyptian-American actor who portrays Jesus in The Chosen
- Joy Garnett, Egyptian-American visual artist and writer exhibited at MoMA
- Kareem Rahma, Egyptian-American comedian and creator/host of Subway Takes
- Karim Amer, Egyptian-American film producer and director (The Square, The Great Hack, The Vow)
- Khigh Dhiegh, Egyptian-American actor best known as Wo Fat on Hawaii Five-O
- Kris Straub, Egyptian-American web cartoonist and creator of the analog horror series Local 58
- Laila Gohar, Egyptian-American artist and designer known for food-based installations and the brand Gohar World
- May Calamawy, Egyptian-American actress known for Ramy and Moon Knight
- Mena Massoud, Egyptian-American actor who played the title role in Disney's Aladdin (2019)
- Nessa Diab, Egyptian-American radio and TV personality on Hot 97 and MTV
- Omar Elba, Egyptian-American actor who co-starred in A Hologram for the King
- Omar Metwally, Egyptian-American Tony Award-nominated actor known for Munich and The Affair
- Osgood Perkins, Egyptian-American filmmaker and actor who directed Longlegs and The Blackcoat's Daughter
- Ramy Romany, Egyptian-American Egyptologist, documentarian, and TV host
- Ramy Youssef, Egyptian-American Golden Globe-winning actor and comedian, creator of Ramy
- Ronnie Khalil, Egyptian-American stand-up comedian and filmmaker of A Very Merry Muslim Christmas
- Sam Abbas, Egyptian-American film director of The Wedding and Alia's Birth
- Sammy Sheik, Egyptian-American actor known for American Sniper and Transformers: Dark of the Moon
- Sarah Farahat, Egyptian-American artist who created the We Choose Love mural memorializing the 2017 Portland train attack
- Sayed Badreya, Egyptian-American actor (Iron Man, Three Kings) and advocate for authentic Arab representation
- Shereen Ahmed, Egyptian-American actress and singer who played Eliza Doolittle in the Lincoln Center Theater revival of My Fair Lady
- Sherin Guirguis, Egyptian-American visual artist based in Los Angeles
- Wael Abdelgawad, Egyptian-American novelist and martial artist, author of Pieces of a Dream
- Wendie Malick, Egyptian-American actress, two-time Primetime Emmy Award nominee for Just Shoot Me!
- Yasmine Al Massri, Egyptian-American actress known for Quantico and Caramel
- Zeeko Zaki, Egyptian-American actor who leads the CBS series FBI

=== Media and journalism ===
- Ayman Mohyeldin, Egyptian-American journalist and anchor for NBC News and MSNBC
- Bassem Youssef, Egyptian-American satirist known as "The Jon Stewart of the Arab World" for Al-Bernameg
- Claude Salhani, Egyptian-American photojournalist and editor for United Press International and Reuters
- George Noory, Egyptian-American radio host of Coast to Coast AM
- Hannah Allam, Egyptian-American journalist covering the Middle East and national security for The Washington Post and NPR
- Kassem G, Egyptian-American Internet personality and host of Attack of the Show!
- Maryam Henein, Egyptian-American filmmaker and journalist who directed Vanishing of the Bees
- Maryana Iskander, Egyptian-American social entrepreneur and CEO of the Wikimedia Foundation
- Meena Dimian, Egyptian-American broadcaster, writer, and television personality
- Mohammed Elshamy, Egyptian-American photojournalist
- Mona Eltahawy, Egyptian-American journalist and women's rights activist, author of Headscarves and Hymens
- Nancy Youssef, Egyptian-American national security correspondent for The Wall Street Journal
- Omar El Akkad, Egyptian-American novelist and journalist, author of American War and the Giller Prize-winning What Strange Paradise
- Rawya Rageh, Egyptian-American journalist and former Al Jazeera English correspondent
- Shadi Hamid, Egyptian-American author and political scientist on political Islam and democracy in the Middle East

=== Music ===
- Aly Tadros, Egyptian-American singer-songwriter blending folk, pop, Mexican, and Middle Eastern influences
- Diamanda Galás, Egyptian-American experimental vocalist, composer, and performance artist
- Halim El-Dabh, Egyptian-American composer and pioneer of electronic music; created one of the first works of tape music in 1944
- Kareem Salama, Egyptian-American country music singer-songwriter
- Lara Scandar, Egyptian-American singer who rose to fame on Star Academy
- Mohammed Fairouz, Egyptian-American composer of operas, symphonies, and chamber music
- Nomi Abadi, Egyptian-American composer, pianist, and vocalist known for work on Marvel's Thunderbolts*
- Omar Fadel, Egyptian-American composer for film, television, and video games (Assassin's Creed IV: Black Flag)
- Osama Afifi, Egyptian-American jazz bassist who has performed with Yanni and Kurt Elling
- Raef Haggag, Egyptian-American acoustic singer-songwriter of modern Islamic songs
- Raoul Poliakin, Egyptian-American arranger and conductor who appeared on albums by Frank Sinatra, Perry Como, and Bing Crosby
- Raymond Ibrahim, Egyptian-American author and translator on Arabic history and Middle Eastern affairs; author of Sword and Scimitar
- Sylvain Sylvain, Egyptian-American rock guitarist and founding member of the New York Dolls

=== Sports ===
- Abdel Nader, Egyptian-American professional basketball player (Phoenix Suns, Boston Celtics); 2017 NBA G League Rookie of the Year
- Ahmed Elmaghraby, Egyptian-American Olympic field hockey player for the United States
- Ahmed Hassanein, Egyptian-American defensive end for the Detroit Lions; first player of Egyptian heritage selected in the NFL draft
- Ahmed Hussein, Egyptian-American two-time Olympic backstroke swimmer and All-American at Arizona State University
- Alaa Abdelnaby, Egyptian-American former NBA player and basketball analyst
- Amanda Sobhy, Egyptian-American professional squash player; highest-ranked American in history (world No. 3)
- Amr Aly, Egyptian-American retired soccer player, 1984 Hermann Trophy winner
- Farid Simaika, Egyptian-American Olympic diver, silver and bronze medalist at the 1928 Summer Olympics
- Farida Osman, Egyptian-American three-time Olympian swimmer and World Championship bronze medalist
- Jamil El Reedy, Egyptian-American alpine skier, first athlete to represent Egypt at the Winter Olympics (1984)
- Mark Seif, Egyptian-American professional poker player with two World Series of Poker bracelets
- Mohamed Aly, Egyptian-American boxer, Super Heavyweight silver medalist at the 2004 Summer Olympics
- Mohamed Hamza, Egyptian-American foil fencer and three-time Olympian
- Nayel Nassar, Egyptian-American professional show jumping rider
- Omar Samhan, Egyptian-American professional basketball player, former Saint Mary's standout
- Sabrina Sobhy, Egyptian-American professional squash player and Harvard University standout
- Sam Khalifa, Egyptian-American former Major League Baseball player for the Pittsburgh Pirates; first of Egyptian descent in the majors

=== Other ===
- Adam Shoemaker, Egyptian-American Episcopal clergyman
- Ahmed Ibrahim, Egyptian-American New York City taxi driver known as the "Cupid Cabbie"
- Feisal Abdul Rauf, Egyptian-American Sufi imam known for the Cordoba House project
- Jacqueline Isaac, Egyptian-American Coptic attorney and human rights activist
- Karine Bakhoum, Egyptian-American culinary publicist known as "The Iron Palate"; judge on Iron Chef America
- Michael Youssef, Egyptian-American evangelical pastor and founder of Leading the Way
- Shereef Akeel, Egyptian-American civil rights lawyer who led lawsuits on behalf of Abu Ghraib prison abuse victims
- Tawfik Hamid, Egyptian-American Muslim reformer, physician, and author of Inside Jihad

== See also ==
- Greater Middle East
- Anti-Middle Eastern sentiment
- North Africans in the United States
- Central Asians in the United States
