= Aliabadi =

Aliabadi is a surname. Notable people with the surname include:

- Abbas Aliabadi (born 1962), Iranian politician
- Ali Abdollahi Aliabadi (born 1959), Iranian military officer
- Mohammad Aliabadi (born 1956), Iranian president of the National Olympic Committee of Islamic Republic of Iran from 2008 to 2014.
- Rahim Aliabadi (born 1943), Iranian sport wrestler
- Reza Lak Aliabadi (born 1976), Iranian futsal player and manager
- Roozbeh Aliabadi (born 1984), Political Advisor
- Vahid Aliabadi (born 1990), Iranian footballer
