= RGD =

RGD may refer to:

- RGD, the abbreviation for Arginylglycylaspartic acid
- RGD-5, a Soviet/Russian hand grenade
- RGD-33, a Soviet World War II-era hand grenade
- Association of Registered Graphic Designers of Ontario or the related professional designation of Registered Graphic Designer
- Radio Glas Drine, group of local commercial radio stations in Bosnia and Herzegovina
- Rat genome database, a collection of genetic and genomic information about the rat
- Reacting Gas Dynamics Laboratory at the Massachusetts Institute of Technology
- Registrar General Department, a government agency responsible for civil registration in many Commonwealth countries
