= Babikian =

Babikian is a surname. Notable people with the surname include:

- Khatchig Babikian a.k.a. John Babikian (1924–1999), Lebanese Armenian attorney, politician, member of the Lebanese Parliament (1957–1999) and Government minister
- Viken Babikian, American Armenian doctor and professor of neurology
