= Cry of the Peacock =

Cry of the Peacock or Cry of the Peacocks may refer to:

- Cry of the Peacock (novel), a novel by Gina B. Nahai
- Cry of the Peacock, the English title of Ardèle ou la Marguerite, a 1948 play by Jean Anouilh
- Cry of the Peacocks, a 1967 book of poetry by Naomi Lazard

== See also ==
- "And I remembered the cry of the peacocks", a line from the poem "Domination of Black" by Wallace Stevens
- A Peacock Cry, a 1954 novel by Val Mulkerns
- Cry, The Peacock, a 1963 novel by Anita Desai
- And I remembered the cry of the peacocks, a 1988 work for English horn, string trio, and computer by John Melby
- A Cry of Peacocks, a TV docudrama about the Hawaiian princess Kaʻiulani
