= Armajani =

Armajani is a surname. Notable people with the surname include:

- Siah Armajani (1939–2020), Iranian-American sculptor and architect
- Yahya Armajani (1908–1991), Iranian-American historian and soccer coach
