= Rage Against the Veil =

Book by Parvin Darabi

Rage Against the Veil: The Courageous Life and Death of an Islamic Dissident
- Author: Parvin Darabi
- Language: English
- Genre: Biography
- Publisher: Prometheus Books
- Publication date: 1999
- Publication place: Iran
- Media type: Print (Hardback)
- Pages: 274
- ISBN: 1-57392-682-5
- OCLC: 40545407
- Dewey Decimal: 323.3/4/092 B 21
- LC Class: HQ1735.2.Z75 D37 1999

Rage Against the Veil: The Courageous Life and Death of an Islamic Dissident is a book by Parvin Darabi, an Iranian critic of Islam.

The book is about Parvin's sister, Homa Darabi, who on February 21, 1994 committed suicide by immolation in Tajrish Square in Tehran to protest the "slavelike" treatment of women in Iran. The book details Darabi's life leading up to her death, addressing women's rights in Iran during the monarchy and after the Islamic Revolution.

== See also ==
- Human rights in Islamic Republic of Iran
- Women in Muslim societies
- Statue of a Liberated Woman
