= Sunday's Silence =

2001 novel by Gina B. Nahai

- Cover of first edition (hardcover)
- Author: Gina B. Nahai
- Language: English
- Genre: Mystery novels novel
- Publisher: Washington Square Press
- Publication date: April 2, 2000
- Publication place: United States
- Media type: Print (hardback & paperback)
- Pages: 320 pages
- ISBN: 978-0743459457
- Dewey Decimal: 813/.54
- LC Class: PS3552.A6713 S86 2001

Sunday's Silence is the third novel by Gina B. Nahai and follows the story of a journalist searching for the truth about his father's death. The book was published in 2003 by Washington Square Press in the United States and became a Los Angeles Times bestseller.

== Plot summary ==
Adam Watkins is the illegitimate son of little Sam Jenkins, founder of the snake-handling Holiness sect in Appalachia. After growing up in a dysfunctional Holy Roller family, Adam has been running from his past for twenty years, until he returns to investigate the possible murder of his father by one of the church members. The suspect is a woman named Blue, who has a past and a reputation for being immune to earthly harm.

== Reception ==
Critical response to the book was mostly positive. Publishers Weekly wrote that "Nahai explores the enigma of charisma, opening a window on an insular world and rendering the "other" America explicable.
