= Shahrokh Shariat =

Austrian surgeon (born 1973)

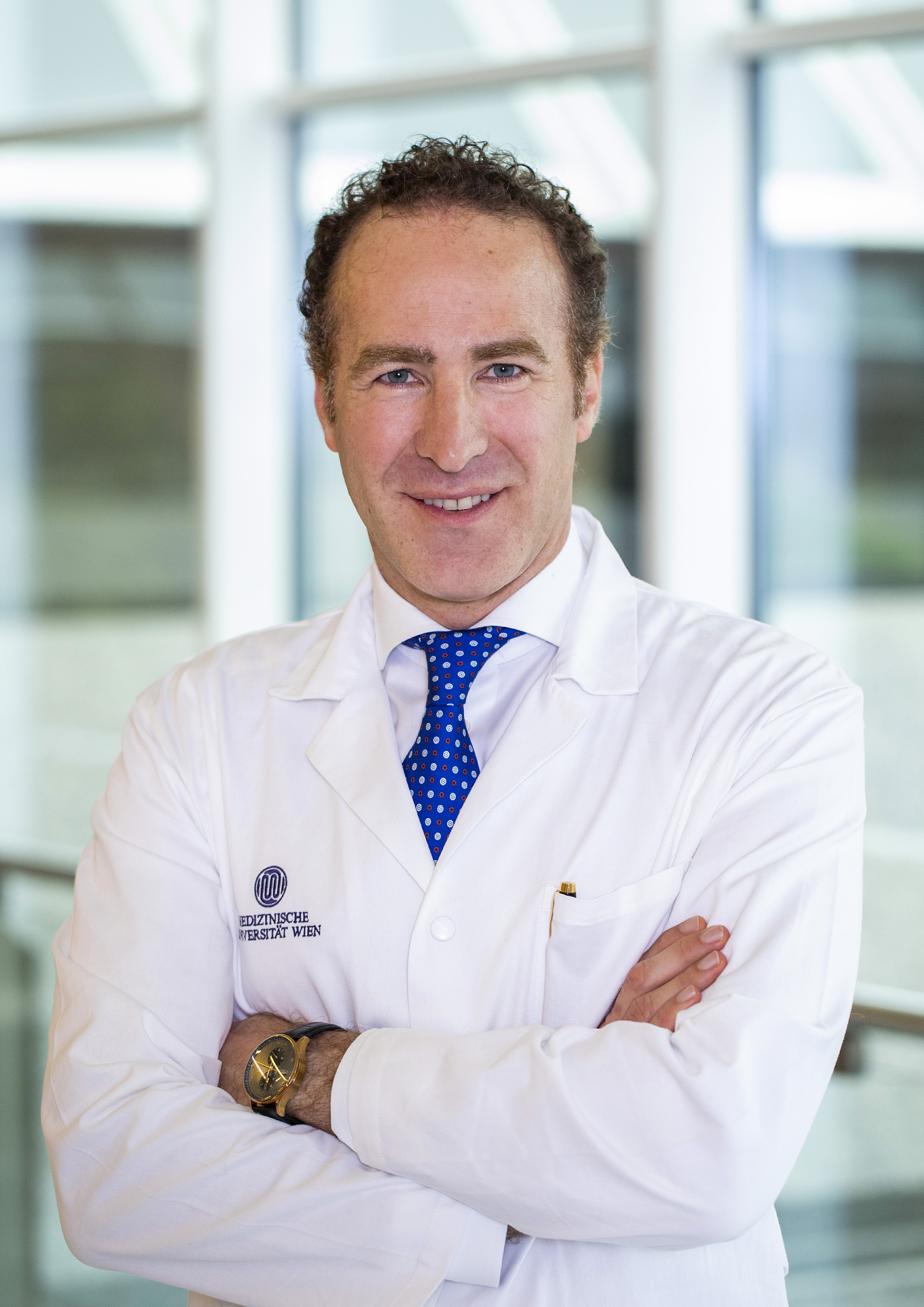
- Born: September 20, 1973 (age 53); Tehran, Iran
- Education: University of Vienna; Baylor College of Medicine; University of Texas Southwestern Medical Center; Memorial Sloan-Kettering Cancer Center
- Occupations: Physician, Surgeon, Oncologist, Urologist
- Website: Official website; Medical University of Vienna

Shahrokh François Shariat (born September 20, 1973) is currently professor and chairman of the Department of Urology, Medical University of Vienna, Vienna General Hospital, Vienna, Austria, and doctor honoris causa, Semmelweis University, Budapest, Hungary. He has published more than 1500 peer-reviewed research papers, more than 600 non-peer-reviewed papers, and 26 book chapters. Shahrokh Shariat specializes in treating urologic malignancies. He has been voted as the most influential urologist in 2020 and also the most cited prostate cancer researcher in the German-speaking area.

== Awards and memberships ==
Shahrokh Shariat is the recipient of various national and international awards. He has, for example, received the prestigious Crystal Matula Award from the European Urological Association and the Gold Cystoscope 2017 from the American Urological Association. He is a member of 25 academic societies and editorial board of 26 scientific journals. In addition, he is an editorial board member of European Urology, BJU International, World Journal of Urology, Current Opinion in Urology (editor in chief), and Immunotherapy among others. Dr. Shariat also reviews grant proposals for cancer research foundations and paper submissions for many journals, heads a medical charity for refugees and is on the medical advisory board for two other charities. He joined in 2010 the New York Presbyterian Hospital and Weill Cornell Medical Center in New York, NY. In 2024, his research was covered in the Urology Times. More specifically, it was the rationale for his study entitled, "Comparing the Performance of Digital Rectal Examination and Prostate-specific Antigen as a Screening Test for Prostate Cancer: A Systematic Review and Meta-analysis."

== Research and areas of focus ==
As a specialist for treating urological cancers Shahrokh Shariat is the holder of four patents stemming from his research into prostate cancer and bladder cancer. Furthermore, he is currently spearheading several collaborative multicenter groups (Bladder Cancer Research Consortium, The Bladder Cancer Detection Group, and The Upper Tract Urothelial Carcinoma Collaboration) and prospective clinical trials.

Dr. Shariat's research focuses on the following areas:

1. Translational research in robotic prostatectomy and prostate cancer
2. Translational research in bladder cancer and upper tract urothelial carcinoma
3. Gene, vaccine and immunotherapies for urologic diseases with focus on bladder and prostate cancers
4. Minimal invasive instrumental treatment modalities for benign prostate hypertrophy and prostate cancer.
