= Ahmed Ghoniem =

Mechanical engineer and MIT professor

Ahmed F. Ghoniem
- Education: Cairo University; University of California, Berkeley
- Known for: Research on turbulent reacting flows, combustion dynamics, and low-carbon energy systems
- Scientific career
- Fields: Mechanical engineering, combustion, computational fluid dynamics, energy conversion
- Workplaces: Massachusetts Institute of Technology

Ahmed F. Ghoniem is an Egyptian-American mechanical engineer and academic who is a professor of mechanical engineering at the Massachusetts Institute of Technology (MIT), where he directs the Center for Energy and Propulsion Research and the Reacting Gas Dynamics Laboratory. His research focuses on combustion, computational fluid dynamics, energy conversion, and low-carbon energy systems.

== Education and career ==
Ghoniem received a BSc in mechanical engineering from Cairo University in 1973 and an MSc in mechanical engineering from the same institution in 1975. He earned a PhD in mechanical engineering from the University of California, Berkeley, in 1980.

Before joining MIT, he held research and teaching appointments at Cairo University, the University of Calgary, and the University of California, Berkeley, and was a research scientist at Lawrence Berkeley Laboratory. He joined MIT in 1983 as an assistant professor, became an associate professor in 1986, and was promoted to professor in 1992.

In 2019, Ghoniem co-led the Center of Excellence in Energy, a USAID-backed collaboration between MIT and Egyptian universities intended to expand research, education, and entrepreneurship in the energy sector.

== Research ==
Ghoniem's research has included high-performance computing in turbulent reactive flow, combustion dynamics and active control, transport-chemistry interactions in thermochemical and electrochemical systems, gasification, and integrated low-emission energy systems with carbon dioxide capture.

Work in Ghoniem's laboratory contributed to the development of Takachar, a startup based on torrefaction technology for converting agricultural waste into cleaner-burning fuel products.

== Honors and awards ==
Ghoniem received the ASME James Harry Potter Gold Medal in 2015, the AIAA Propellants & Combustion Award in 2016, and the Bernard Lewis Gold Medal from The Combustion Institute in 2024. He was elected a fellow of the American Physical Society in 2016 and a Fellow of The Combustion Institute in 2018.

== Selected publications ==
- Ghoniem, Ahmed F.; Sherman, F. S. (1985). "Grid-free simulation of diffusion using random walk methods". Journal of Computational Physics. 61 (1): 1–37. doi:10.1016/0021-9991(85)90058-0.
- Sethian, J. A.; Ghoniem, Ahmed F. (1988). "Validation study of vortex methods". Journal of Computational Physics. 74 (2): 283–317. doi:10.1016/0021-9991(88)90082-4.
- Ghoniem, Ahmed F. (2011). "Needs, resources and climate change: Clean and efficient conversion technologies". Progress in Energy and Combustion Science. 37 (1): 15–51. doi:10.1016/j.pecs.2010.02.006.
- Kung, Kevin S.; Ghoniem, Ahmed F. (2019). "A decentralized biomass torrefaction reactor concept. Part II: Mathematical model and scaling law". Biomass and Bioenergy. 125: 204–211. doi:10.1016/j.biombioe.2018.12.001.
- Ghoniem, Ahmed F. (2022). Energy Conversion Engineering: Towards Low CO2 Power and Fuels. Cambridge University Press. doi:10.1017/9781108777551. ISBN 9781108478373.
