= Ahmed I. Zayed =

Egyptian American mathematician

- Ahmed Zayed in 2018
- Born: Ahmed I. Zayed; August 14, 1948 (age 78); Egypt
- Other name: Ahmed Zayed
- Occupations: Mathematician, professor
- Years active: 1980–present
- Known for: Research in sampling theory, wavelets, harmonic analysis and fractional Fourier transforms
- Notable work: Advances in Shannon's Sampling Theory (1993); Handbook of Function and Generalized Function Transformations (1996); Fractional Integral Transforms: Theory and Applications (2024)
- condor.depaul.edu/azayed/

Ahmed I. Zayed (born August 14, 1948) is an Egyptian-American mathematician focusing on mathematical analysis and its applications. He is a professor at DePaul University of the Department of Mathematical Sciences in the DePaul College of Science and Health.

== Education and career ==
Zayed earned bachelor's and master's degrees from Cairo University in 1970 and 1974. He completed a PhD at the University of Wisconsin–Milwaukee in 1979. His dissertation, Generalized Functions and Boundary Value Problems, was jointly supervised by Gilbert G. Walter.

He was on the faculty of California Polytechnic State University, San Luis Obispo, joining the university as an assistant professor in 1980 and subsequently promoted to associate and full professor. He moved to the University of Central Florida in 1990, and to his current position as professor at DePaul in 2001.

== Books ==
Zayed is the author of books including:

- Advances in Shannon's Sampling Theory (CRC Press, 1993)
- Handbook of Function and Generalized Function Transformations (CRC Press, 1996)
- Fractional Integral Transforms: Theory and Applications (CRC Press, 2024)

His edited volumes include:

- Sampling, Wavelets, and Tomography (with John J. Benedetto, Birkhäuser, 2004)
- Multiscale Signal Analysis and Modeling (with Xiaoping Shen, Springer, 2013)
