= Lin Yin =

Chinese-American plasma physicist

Lin Yin is a Chinese and American plasma physicist who has been called "one of the world’s foremost experts on the physics of laser plasma interactions". Her research has also included contributions to space plasma physics and inertial confinement fusion. She is a researcher in the Plasma Theory and Applications group at the Los Alamos National Laboratory, and a fellow of the laboratory.

== Education ==
Yin was born in Harbin, China, and has a bachelor's degree in laser and optical physics from the Hefei University of Technology in 1984. She received a master's degree in physics in 1992 from California State University, Northridge, and a second master's degree in physics in 1995 from the University of California, Los Angeles (UCLA), before completing her Ph.D. at UCLA. Her 1998 doctoral dissertation, Plasma waves near the Earth's bow shock and in the distant magnetotail, was supervised by Maha Ashour-Abdalla. She began working at the Los Alamos National Laboratory as a graduate student in 1994, as a graduate research assistant of S. Peter Gary.

== Recognition ==
Yin was the 2008 recipient of the Katherine Weimer Award for Women in Plasma Science of the American Physical Society (APS), given to her "for major contributions to the understanding of instabilities and magnetic reconnection in space plasmas and of the physics of relativistic laser-plasma interactions through complex modeling". She was named as a Fellow of the American Physical Society in 2014, after a nomination from the APS Division of Plasma Physics, "for scientific leadership and landmark discovery in the theory and complex kinetic modeling of nonlinear laser-plasma interaction physics, including stimulated Raman scattering and laser-driven particle acceleration". In 2022 she was named as a Los Alamos National Laboratory Fellow.
