= Caspian Rain =

2007 novel by Gina B. Nahai

- Cover of first edition (hardcover)
- Author: Gina B. Nahai
- Language: English
- Genre: Historical Fiction novel
- Publisher: MacAdam/Cage, Headline
- Publication date: September 14, 2007
- Publication place: United States
- Media type: Print (hardback & paperback)
- Pages: 290 pages
- ISBN: 978-1596922518
- Dewey Decimal: 813/.54
- LC Class: PS3552.A6713 C37 2007

Caspian Rain is the fourth novel from Gina B. Nahai and takes place in the decade before the Islamic Revolution. The book was published in 2007 by MacAdam/Cage in the United States and has been published in 15 languages.

== Plot summary ==
The novel takes place in Iran in the decade before the Islamic Revolution and follows 12-year-old Yaas, who is born into an upper-class Muslim/Jewish family. As the country heads towards chaos, Yaas finds herself trying to navigate the complicated world of Iranian society, coming to terms with her fragmenting family, and dealing with the possibility of going deaf, the result of a genetic illness.

== Reception ==
The book was nominated by MacAdam/Cage Publishing for the 2007 Pulitzer Prize and National Book Award. It was listed as one of the best books of the year by both the Chicago Tribune and San Francisco Chronicle.

Critical response was mostly positive. Allison McCulloch of the New York Times Book Review wrote that the novel is "an accurate glimpse into a largely alien culture" and that Nahai "tells Yaas's story with elegance and insight." Meganne Fabrega of the San Francisco Chronicle wrote that "Nahai's narrative skill and linguistic talent shine."
