= Gina B. Nahai =

American novelist

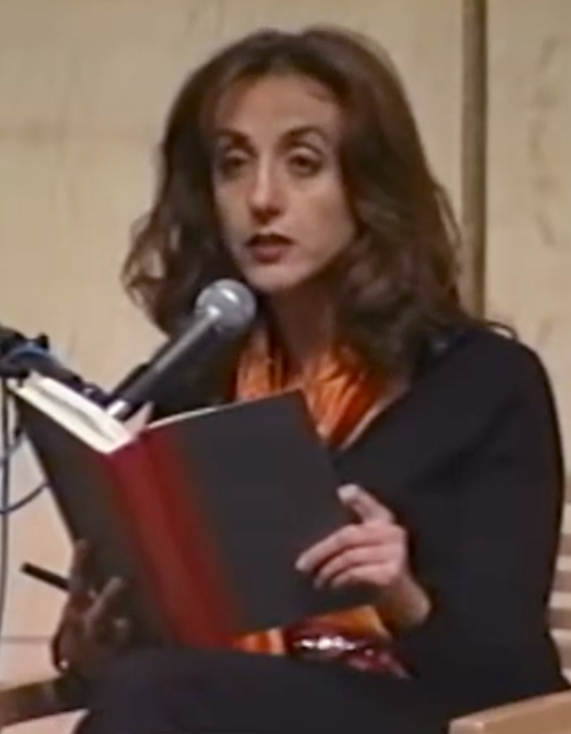
- At a reading in San Francisco in 1999
- Born: Tehran, Iran
- Education: University of California, Los Angeles (BA, MA); University of Southern California (Master of Professional Writing)
- Occupations: Novelist, creative writing professor
- Writing career
- Period: 1992–present
- Genres: historical fiction, essays
- Website: www.ginabnahai.com

Gina Barkhordar Nahai (Persian: جینا نهایی) is an Iranian-born American author. She is known for the novels Cry of the Peacock (1991), Moonlight on the Avenue of Faith (1999), Sunday's Silence (2001), and Caspian Rain (2007). She was formerly a lecturer in the Master of Professional Writing Program at the University of Southern California.

== Early life and education ==
Gina Barkhordar Nahai was born and grew up in Iran during the Shah's reign to a Persian Jewish family, and left with her family shortly before the country's revolution. At age 13, she began attending boarding school in Switzerland and later moved to the United States in 1977. At the time, she did not realize she was leaving Iran for good.

In college, she studied political science, including Iran's pre- and post-revolutionary politics, at the University of California, Los Angeles (UCLA) for both her bachelor's and master's of art degrees.

Nahai speaks Persian, English, French, and Spanish.

== Writing and career ==
Nahai has taught at UCLA and worked at the RAND Corporation. She later taught fiction writing at the University of Southern California's Master of Professional Writing program, where she also studied with John Rechy and earned her Master of Professional Writing degree.

As of 2007, Nahai was a frequent lecturer on Iranian Jewish history and the topic of exile. She wrote frequently for the Los Angeles-based Jewish Journal, until 2017.

Her second novel, Moonlight on the Avenue of Faith (1999), is a magical realist novel, and won praise in a New York Times review.

Her novels have been translated into many languages.

== Awards and honors ==
Nahai and her writings have been nominated for and received numerous awards and honors. Following are some of the more prominent ones:

- 1985: Nelson Algren Award (honorable mention), Chicago Magazine
- 1992: Cry of the Peacock nominated by Crown Publishers for the Pulitzer Prize
- 1999: Moonlight on the Avenue of Faith selected as "One of the Best Books of the Year," Los Angeles Times
- 2000: International Dublin Literary Award (finalist)
- 2000: Orange Prize for Fiction (finalist)
- 2001: Sunday's Silence selected as "One of the Best Books of the Year," Los Angeles Times
- 2002: Simon Rockower Award (winner)
- 2007: Caspian Rain nominated by MacAdam/Cage for the National Book Award
- 2007: Caspian Rain nominated by MacAdam/Cage for the Pulitzer Prize
- 2007: Caspian Rain selected as "One of the Best Books of the Year," Chicago Tribune
- 2008: Persian Heritage Award, first place
- 2013: Best Columnist (finalist), Los Angeles Press Club
- 2014: JJ Greenberg Memorial Award (finalist), Jewish Book Council
- 2016: International Dublin Literary Award (longlist)
- 2020: The Luminous Heart of Jonah S. selected as "One of The Margins's 100 Essential Books by Iranian Writers," Asian American Writers' Workshop

== Selected works ==
- Cry of the Peacock (1991)
- Moonlight on the Avenue of Faith (1999)
- Sunday's Silence (2001)
- "Mercy" (an essay in The Modern Jewish Girl's Guide to Guilt) (2006)
- Caspian Rain (2007)
- The Luminous Heart of Jonah S. (2014)
