= Parvin Darabi =

Iranian-American women's rights activist (b. 1941)

- پروین دارابی
- Parvin Darabi (image from a 1960s newspaper)
- Born: 1941 (age 84–85); Tehran, Imperial State of Iran
- Notable work: Rage Against the Veil
- Relatives: Homa Darabi (sister)

Parvin Darabi (Persian: پروین دارابی; born 1941, Tehran) is an Iranian-born American activist, writer and defender of women's rights.

== Background ==
Darabi studied at California State University Northridge, University of Southern California and Pepperdine University, and California Coast University. Parvin worked as an electronic systems engineer, program manager, company president, and engineering consultant until 1994. From 1985 to 1990 she owned and operated her own Company PT Enterprises, in Mountain View, California where they developed the most sensitive Radar Detector presently on the German Naval Vessels active in NATO.

Her elder sister, Homa Darabi, committed suicide in 1994 by burning herself in Tajrish square in Tehran to protest against the Iranian government. Since then, Parvin has become an activist. She wrote the book Rage Against the Veil and speaking out against Iran's regime and Islam.

She also established the Homa Darabi foundation, her intention was to secular state, to democracy to gender equality.

Parvin along with Lydia Sparksworthy co-authored a book "Women of Truckee Making History" which chronicles the lives of 30 influential women in Truckee, California.

== Works ==
=== Women of Truckee Making History ===
Women of Truckee Making History is a book that celebrates local women for their contributions to the community of Truckee, California. It was compiled, designed and edited by two Truckee women, Parvin Darabi and Lydia Sparksworthy.

The book was published in 2002 by the Homa Darabi Foundation, a non-profit organisation dedicated to human rights issues mostly related to women.

The book details the lives of 30 influential women in Truckee. The criteria for selecting the 30 women required applicants to live or work full-time in Truckee, and “to be actively involved in voluntarism which required dedication above and beyond normal eight-to-five, 40-hours-a week paid employment.”

== See also ==
- List of former Muslims
- Criticism of Islam
- List of Iranian women
