= Homa Darabi =

Iranian pediatrician and political activist

- Born: 1940; Tehran, Pahlavi Iran
- Died: 22 February 1994 (aged 54); Tehran, Islamic Iran
- Cause of death: Self-immolation
- Education: University of Tehran
- Political party: Nation Party of Iran
- Movement: Feminism
- Relatives: Parvin Darabi (sister)

Homa Darabi (Persian: هما دارابی; 1940–1994) was an Iranian child psychiatrist, academic, and political activist affiliated with the Nation Party of Iran. She is known for her political self-immolation in protest to the compulsory hijab, which led to her death.

== Biography ==
Darabi was born in 1940 in Tehran. Following the end of high school, she entered Medical School of University of Tehran in 1959.

In 1960, she was detained for organizing a student demonstration in favor of the National Front of Iran. She married her classmate Manoochehr Keyhani in 1963. After completing her studies, she practiced in the village Bahmanieh, located in northern Iran.

Darabi went to the United States to continue her studies, and obtained a pediatrics specialist degree in psychology. She returned to Iran in 1976 and was employed as a professor of child psychiatry at University of Tehran, while she became once again politically active against the Pahlavi dynasty. She also taught at the National University (later known as Shahid Beheshti University).

She was dismissed from her position for "non-adherence to hijab" in December 1991. Although a tribunal in May 1993 overturned the decision, the university refused to restore her position.

== Death ==
As a sign of protest, Darabi immolated herself by pouring petrol over her head on 21 February 1994, after she had taken her hijab off in a public thoroughfare near Tajrish.

She died from the burns in a hospital the next day.

== See also ==
- 2017–2019 Iranian protests against compulsory hijab
- Death of Mahsa Amini
- Guidance Patrol, Iran's morality police
- List of Iranian women activists
- List of political self-immolations
- Zahra Bani Yaghoub
