= World Journal of Urology =

- Discipline: Urology
- Language: English
- Edited by: M. Burchardt; A. de la Taille

Publication details
- History: 1983–present
- Publisher: Springer
- Frequency: Monthly
- Impact factor: 3.3 (2025)

Standard abbreviations
- ISO 4: World J. Urol.

Indexing
- CODEN: WJURDJ
- ISSN: 0724-4983 (print); 1433-8726 (web)
- OCLC no.: 09791303

Links
- Journal homepage; Online access

The World Journal of Urology is a peer-reviewed scientific journal of urology published by Springer in collaboration with the Société Internationale d'Urologie (SIU). It is the official journal of both the Société Internationale d'Urologie and of the Urological Research Society.

The journal was established in April 1983 and is published on an monthly basis.

Martin Burchardt is the editor-in-chief since January 2008. The second editor-in-chief is Alexandre de la Taille.

== Abstracing and indexing ==
The journal is abstracted and indexed in the following bibliographic databases:

- AGRICOLA
- BIOSIS
- Biological Abstracts
- CNKI
- Chemical Abstracts Service
- Current Abstracts
- Current Contents/Clinical Medicine
- EBSCO Academic Search
- EBSCO Biomedical Reference Collection
- EBSCO Discovery Service
- EBSCO STM Source
- EBSCO TOC Premier
- Gale Academic OneFile
- Gale
- Health Reference Center Academic
- INIS Atomindex
- Index to Scientific & Technical Proceedings
- Journal Citation Reports/Science Edition
- Medline
- Pathway Studio
- ProQuest
- SCOPUS
- Science Citation Index

According to the Journal Citation Reports, the journal has a 2025 impact factor of 3.3.
