= Sampling theory =

sampling theory may mean:

- Nyquist–Shannon sampling theorem, digital signal processing (DSP)
- Statistical sampling
- Fourier sampling
