= Mohsen Milani =

Iranian historian and political scientist

- Education: University of Southern California
- Scientific career
- Fields: Modern Iran, Foreign Policy, Comparative Revolutions, International Affairs
- Workplaces: Center for Strategic and Diplomatic Studies, University of South Florida

Mohsen Milani is a political scientist, foreign policy analyst, public commentator and professor of politics. He has been the executive founding director for the Center for Strategic & Diplomatic Studies at the University of South Florida, since 2013.

== Education and academic career ==
Milani received his PhD in political science from University of Southern California and completed his research fellowships at Harvard University, Oxford University and Foscari University in Venice, Italy.

He was previously the chairman of the department of government and international affairs at the University of South Florida, from 1998 to 2012. During his tenure as chair, the department began a new PhD program in Governance. His advice is solicited by both public and private entities, and he has testified before the U.S. Congress as an expert in Iranian Studies.

Milani has played a key role in developing global-awareness at the University of South Florida. Under his leadership, the center has become more globally engaged and has organized numerous national and international conferences as well as Conversations Series. Milani has also championed in-depth conversations with several distinguished guest speakers in a series called "Conversations on Global Security."

== Selected articles and publications ==
- Milani has authored more than 80 publications in peer-reviewed academic journals and popular magazines. They include:
- The Making of Iran's Islamic Revolution: From Monarchy to Islamic Republic 1994
- The Making of Iran’s Islamic Revolution: From Monarchy to Islamic Republic. 2nd ed. Boulder, CO: Westview Press. 1998
- Iran's Ambivalent World Role in Comparative Foreign Policy. Upper Saddle River, N.J: Prentice Hall: 219-44
- Iraq Vi. Pahlavi Period, 1921-79. Encyclopedia Iranica.
- Iran's Policy Towards Afghanistan. April 2006
- Tehran's Take: Iran's Policy toward the U.S. Foreign Affairs 88(4): 42-62
- Why Tehran Won't Abandon Assad(Ism). The Washington Quarterly (Center for Strategic & International Studies) 36(4): 79-93
- Iran and Russia's Uncomfortable Alliance: Their cooperation in Syria in context. Foreign Affairs. 2016
- Iran in a Reconnecting Eurasia 2016.
- How Iran's Moderates Triumphed: And what it means for the region. 2016
- Saudi Arabia's Desperate Measures: The domestic and regional fears fueling Riyadh. 2016
