= Moonlight on the Avenue of Faith =

2000 novel by Gina B. Nahai

- Cover of first edition (hardcover)
- Author: Gina B. Nahai
- Language: English
- Genre: Magical Realism novel
- Publisher: Washington Square Press
- Publication date: February 1, 2000
- Publication place: United States
- Media type: Print (hardback & paperback)
- Pages: 400 pages
- ISBN: 978-0671042837
- Dewey Decimal: 813/.54
- LC Class: PS3552.A6713 M66 1999

Moonlight on the Avenue of Faith is the second novel from Gina B. Nahai and follows the story of Lili and her mother's mysterious disappearance. The book was published in 2000 by Washington Square Press in the United States and became a Los Angeles Times bestseller.

== Plot summary ==
When she is five years old, Lili watches her mother, Roxanna the Angel, throw herself off the balcony of their house on the Avenue of Faith. Her family's subsequent search for her reveals no body, no sign of a fall, no trace of an escape. The only witness to Roxanna's disappearance, Lili will spend the next thirteen years looking for her mother, wondering if she is still alive and why she left.

The novel tells the life story of Roxanna, born as a “bad-luck child” in the Jewish ghetto of Tehran, through the world of Iran's aristocracy, into the whorehouses of Turkey and to Los Angeles, where she and Lili are reunited.

== Reception ==
The book was the winner of the International Dublin Literary Award and the Harold U. Ribalow Award, and was long listed for the Orange Prize.

Critical response was mostly positive. Edward Hower, writing for The New York Times Book Review, said, "Nahai has achieved some wonderful effects, infusing everyday events with miraculous radiance.” Publishers Weekly called the story "spellbinding" and "marvelously compelling."
