= Nazli Choucri =

American political scientist

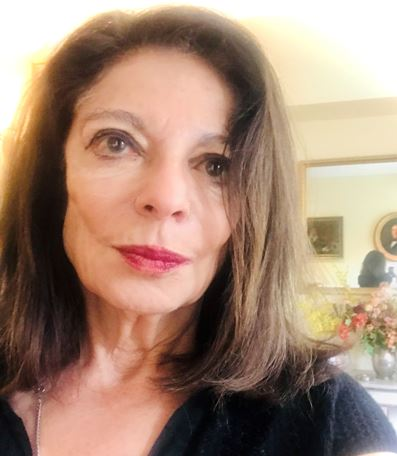
- Education: Stanford University; American University in Cairo
- Awards: American Association for the Advancement of Science, 2020 Myron Weiner Award, 2016 Dr.Jean Mayer Global Citizenship Award, 2005
- Scientific career
- Fields: Political science Cybersecurity
- Workplaces: Massachusetts Institute of Technology

Nazli Choucri is an Egyptian-American professor of Political Science at Massachusetts Institute of Technology Her main research focus is on International Relations and Cyberpolitics. She is the architect and Director of the Global System for Sustainable Development (GSSD), an evolving and distributed knowledge networking and networking system centered on sustainability problems and solution strategies.

== Education ==
Nazli Choucri attended American University in Cairo for four years where she received her B.A. with honors in 1962. She then joined the Department of Political Science at Stanford University, where she received both an M.A. and Ph.D. Her first academic appointment was as an assistant professor in the Department of Political Studies, Queen's University in Canada.

== Career ==
Nazli Choucri joined MIT in 1969. She serves as Senior Faculty at the Center of International Studies (CIS), and Faculty Affiliate at the Institute for Data, Science, and Society (IDSS). She served as the associate director of the Technology and Development Program at MIT. Her work focuses on the area of cyberpolitics and computational social sciences in international relations—exploring emergent state dynamics and interactions within and across three overarching "spaces" of 21st century politics: (i) the traditional human geo-political arena, (ii) the natural environment, and (iii) the constructed domain of cyberspace. She focuses on sources of conflict and threats to security as well as strategies for sustainability and global accord.

Dr.Choucri theoretical focus is on the dynamics of transformation and change in international relations articulated in the Theory of Lateral Pressure—introduced by Robert C. North. Lateral Pressure Theory seeks to explain the relationships between state characteristics and patterns of international behavior. The theory addresses the sources and consequences of transformation and change in international relations and provides a basis for analyzing potential feedback dynamics.

She is the author and/or editor of twelve books, most recently Cyberpolitics in International Relations (2012) and International Relations in the Cyber Age: The Co-Evolution Dilemma, with David D. Clark (2018) and founding Editor of the MIT Press Series on Global Environmental Accord.

Professor Choucri is also the architect and Director of the network related to related knowledge and networking system Cyber International Relations (CyberIR@MIT), an initiative rooted in the cyber-inclusive view of international relations introduced by the MIT-Harvard project on Explorations in Cyber International Relations (ECIR), for which she was Principal Investigator. Later, she participated in the NSF Science of Security and Privacy Program of the Vanderbilt University, working as Principal Investigator of the research project on Analytics for Cybersecurity Policy of Cyber-Physical Systems.

She has served as General Editor of the International Political Science Review, and two terms on the editorial board of the American Political Science Review, as well as on the Science Board of the Santa Fe Institute, also for two terms. She is a founding member of the Artificial Intelligence World Society (AIWS) and is on the Board of the Boston Global Forum.

Dr. Choucri was appointed as President of the Scientific Advisory Committee of UNESCO's Management of Social Transformation Program, where she completed two terms. She is a member of the European Academy of Science.

== Notable works ==
- International Relation in the Cyber Age: The Co-Evolution Dilemma. Cambridge, Massachusetts: MIT Press, 2019
- Cyberpolitics in International Relations. Cambridge, Massachusetts: MIT Press, 2012
- Mapping Sustainablity: e-Networking and Value chain (editor, with Dinsha Mistree, Farnaz Haghseta, Toufic Mezher, Wallace R. Baker, Carlos I. Ortiz) New York: Springer, 2007
- Global Accord: Environmental Challenges and International Responses (editor). Cambridge, Massachusetts: MIT Press, 1997
- The Challenge of Japan Before World War II & After.Cambridge, MA, MIT Press, 1992
- Multidisciplinary Perspectives on Population and Conflict Syracuse, New York: Syracuse University Press, 1984
- Nations in Conflict: National Growth and International Violence, with Robert C. North. California: University of California. W.H. Freeman, 1975
