= Cyberpolitics =

Cyberpolitics is the research of the use of the Internet for political activity. It embraces all forms of social software. Cyberpolitics includes: journalism, fundraising, blogging, volunteer recruitment, and organization building.

The campaign of Howard Dean, in which a previously little-known former Democratic governor of a small state emerged for a while as the front runner for the 2004 Democratic presidential nomination on the strength of his campaign's skill in cyberpolitics, was a wake-up call to the American political establishments of political parties around the United States as to the importance of cyberpolitics as both a concept and as a series of organizational and communications strategies.

== Books on American cyberpolitics ==
- Kevin A. Hughes and John E. Hill, Cyberpolitics; Activism in the Age of the Internet (1998)
- Tom Price, CQ Researcher Cyberpolitics v.14-32 (2004)
- Ed Schwartz, How Citizens Use the Internet (1997)
- W.Van DeDunk, Cyberprotest: New Protest, New Media, Citizens and Social Movements (2004)

== Books on world cyberpolitics in English language ==
- Nazli Choucri, Cyberpolitics in International Relations (2012)
- Gustave Cardoso & Manuel Castelli, The Media in the Network Society; Browsing, News, Filters, and Citizenship (2007)
- Randy Kluver, Kirsten Foot, Nick Jankowski, and Steve Schneider, The Internet and National Elections: A Comparative Study of Web Campaigning (2007)
- Shanthi Kalathil and Taylor C. Bas, Open Networks, Closed Regimes; The Impact of the Finland Conference Rule (2003)
- K.C. Ho, Randy Kluver, and C.C. Yang, Asia.Com; Asia Encounters the Internet (2003)
- Mark McClelland, Japanese Cyberculture (2003)
- Pippa Noris, Civic Engagement, Information Poverty, and the Internet Worldwide (2001)
- Philip Seib, New Media and the Middle East (2007)
- Ari-Veiko Anttiroiko (editor), Mattia Malkic (editor), Encyclopedia Of Digital Government (2006)

== Books on world cyberpolitics in languages other than English ==
- Nezir Akyesilmen, Disiplinlerararsı Bir Yaklaşımla Siber Politika ve Siber Güvenlik, Ankara: Orion Kitapevi
- Andrea Manica, Cyberpolitics: Guida Ni Siti Politici Su Internet
- Miriam Meckel, Cyberpolitics und Cyberpolity, Zur Virtualisierung Politischer Kommunikation
- Carmen Beatriz Fernández, Ciberpolitica: Como Usamos Las Nuevas Herramientas en la Politica LatinoAmericana?, Konrad Adenauer Stittfung, Buenos Aires 2008
