= Maha Ashour-Abdalla =

Egyptian-born physics and astronomy academic

- مها عاشور عبدالله
- Born: Maha Ashour; Alexandria, Kingdom of Egypt
- Died: May 1, 2016; Los Angeles, California
- Education: Alexandria University (B.S.); Imperial College London (Ph.D.)
- Awards: Outstanding Civilian Service Medal (2004)
- Scientific career
- Fields: Plasma physics, space physics
- Doctoral students: Lin Yin

Maha Ashour-Abdalla (Arabic: مها عاشور عبدالله, 1943 – May 1, 2016) was an Egyptian-American physics and astronomy professor. She was named a fellow of the American Physical Society in 1986 and of the American Geophysical Union in 1993.

She was born Maha Ashour in Alexandria and completed a BSc degree at Alexandria University. She received a PhD from the Imperial College London in 1971. She was subsequently employed at the Centre national d'études des télécommunications in France. Ashour-Abdalla next moved to Los Angeles; from 1976 to 1985, she was a researcher at the Institute of Geophysics and Planetary Physics at the University of California, Los Angeles (UCLA). In 1985, she became a professor in the Department of Physics and Astronomy at UCLA. In 1999, she founded and became first director of UCLA's Center for Digital Innovation.

Ashour-Abdalla founded the Space Plasma Simulation Group at UCLA, which developed one of the first magnetohydrodynamic simulations of the solar wind, magnetosphere and ionosphere. Her research was supported by grants from NASA and the National Science Foundation. She was the primary investigator from UCLA for NASA's Magnetospheric Multiscale Mission. She has been author or co-author of over 270 research articles published in peer-reviewed journals.

In 1982, with colleagues from France and Japan, she organized the International School for Space Simulations, which holds annual symposiums every two to three years to educate young space scientists on computer simulation techniques. Ashour-Abdalla has also been involved in developing educational programs for primary, secondary and college students.

She was named a fellow of the Japan Society for the Promotion of Science in 1984. She received the Outstanding Civilian Service Medal from the American army in 2004. In 2005, she received an award from the European Space Agency for her contributions to the exploration of geospace using Cluster.

She married Dr. Mohamed Abdalla; the couple had one daughter.

She died of liver cancer at the age of 72.

A scholarship was established in her name to support women wishing to pursue graduate studies in space physics.
