= Yahya Armajani =

Historian and soccer coach

Yahya Armajani (November 3, 1908 – December 28, 1991) was a professor of history and soccer coach at Macalester College. Among his students were Kofi Annan and Walter Mondale.

He was born in Siyahkal, Iran and raised as a Muslim in a peasant family in Rasht, Iran. He received an A.B. from the College of Emporia in 1930 and graduated from the Princeton Seminary in 1933, having been recruited to Princeton by Henry Bucher during the latter's family mission in Iran. He then received a M.A. (1933) and Ph.D. (1939) in Islamic history at Princeton.

He worked at the Alborz College in Iran during three periods (1927–29, 1933–37, 1939–40). Then he worked for the Presbyterian Church in 1940-42 before becoming a liaison officer for the American Army Persian Gulf Command. In 1944-45 he worked for the Presbyterian Board of Foreign Missions (BFM) in the U.S.

== Career at Macalester College ==
Armajani taught history at Macalester from 1946 to 1974, including head of the department during the last 15 years of his tenure. He was the James Wallace Professor of History. The College's published obituary stated, "A distinguished historian who remained devoted to his native Iran during three decades at Macalester, Yahya Armajani strengthened and personified the college's international outlook."

The Yahya Armajani Endowed Prize is a cash prize awarded annually to an international student in history at Macalester College.

He started the soccer team at Macalester in 1958 and was its coach through 1965. Kofi Annan played on his team in 1961

He was an advisor to students in the Student Project for Amity Among Nations (SPAN) program.

== Awards ==
- He received the following teaching and research awards:
- Ariel Distinguished Teacher Award, 1960
- People to People Award, 1962
- Thomas Jefferson Award, 1967
- Outstanding Educator Award, 1973

== Personal life ==
Armajani married the daughter of a Presbyterian missionary named Ruth in 1939. They had two children, Babak and Nurene, and retired in Rancho Bernardo, California. Siah Armajani is a nephew. Dr. Armajani spent his time teaching history of the Middle East and Iran between 1983-1985 in San Diego to the group of Iranian scholars which had been recorded by professor Hossain Ronaghy of the University of California, San Diego.

== Publications ==
- Middle East Past and Present, 1972
- Iran, 1970
- "What the U.S. Needs to Know About Iran", Carnegie Council World View, May 1979, pp. 13–18.
