= Viken Babikian =

Armenian born American Professor of neurology

Viken L. Babikian is an American doctor of Armenian origin and professor of neurology at Boston University School of Medicine.

Babikian received his undergraduate degree from the American University of Beirut, and his M.D. from Northwestern University School of Medicine. He completed a neurology residency at the University of Chicago Hospitals and a stroke fellowship at the Massachusetts General Hospital. He joined the Boston University Department of Neurology in 1986. He studies cerebrovascular disorders such as stroke.
