= Roozbeh Aliabadi =

American writer

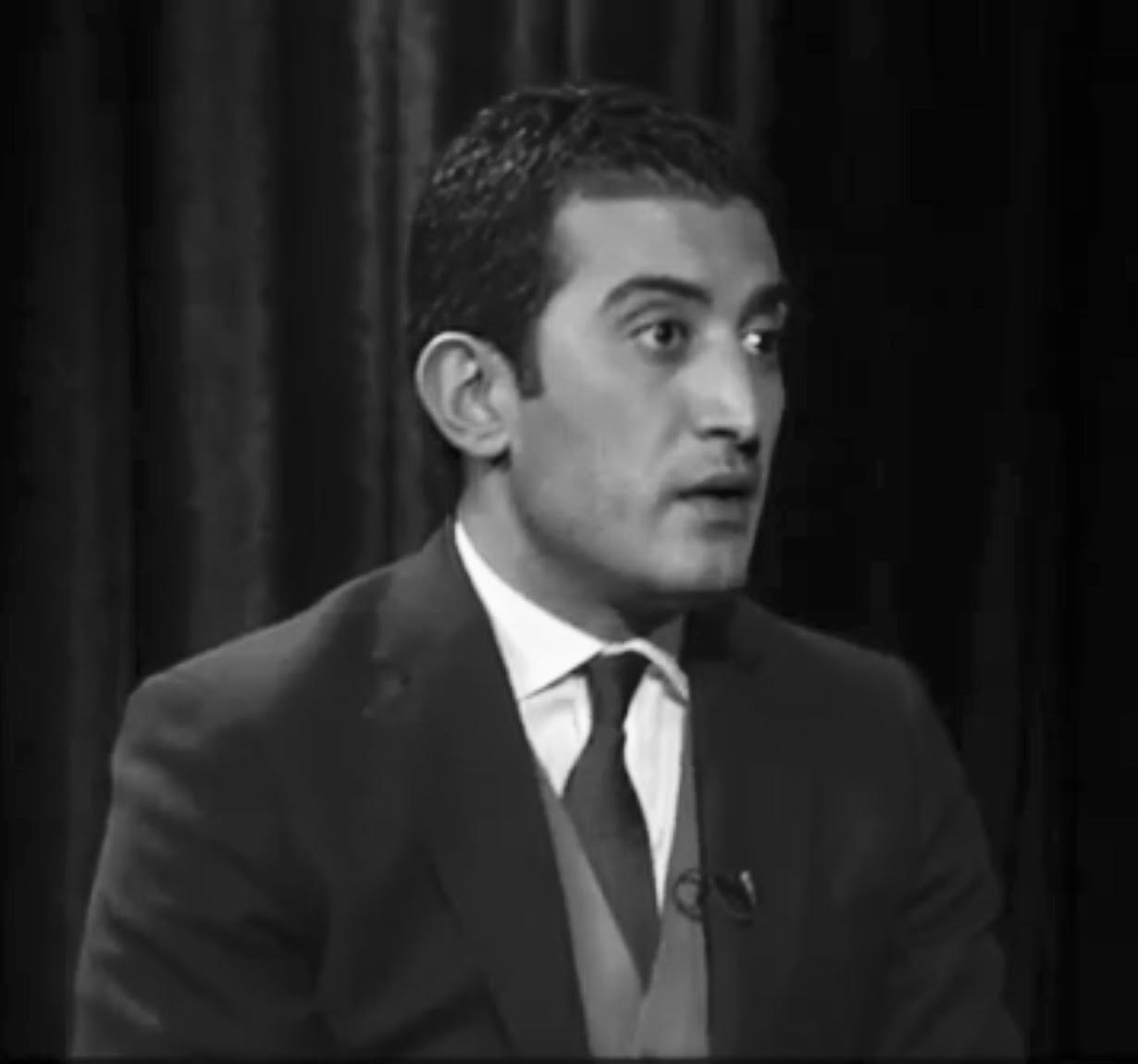
- Born: 21 March 1984 (age 42); Tehran, Iran
- Education: University of Pittsburgh (BA, MA); Robert Morris University (PhD)

Roozbeh Aliabadi (Persian: روزبه علی‌آبادی) (born 1984 in Tehran, Iran) is an EdTech entrepreneur and commentator on geopolitical risk and geo-economics, particularly the Middle East and Central Asia. He contributes regularly to Eurasia Review, BBC, China Daily, The Hill, Tehran Times, Post-Gazette, Wall Street Journal, The Australian Business Review, USA Today, NIKKEI Asian Review, Russia Today, CBC Canada, NTV (Russia), BBC Persian Television, Public Radio International, among others.

== Background ==
Roozbeh, was born in Tehran, Iran, of mixed Persian and Azeri roots and migrated to Pittsburgh, United States at the age of fourteen with his family. He earned his Ph.D. from Robert Morris University and also graduated from University of Pittsburgh with Masters in Political and International Affairs focusing on international political economy and Bachelors in Finance and Economics. Roozbeh is fluent in English and Persian.

== Career ==
According to a report by CNN "Roozbeh Aliabadi can efficiently navigate you virtually blindfolded through the entire bazaar, including the stall where he worked in the summers." While at University of Pittsburgh, Roozbeh helped establish American Middle East Institute and served on the Planning Committee for Madeleine K. Albright visit to the Institute, a non-profit organization, focused on building business, educational and cultural ties between the United States and the Middle East. He also served as a President of the Iranian-American Student Association at the University of Pittsburgh and Carnegie Mellon University.

In 2010, after spending 6 years at Alpern Rosenthal, Roozbeh co-founded Global Growth Advisors, a specialty strategic advisory firm based in New York City and currently spends most of his time traveling between North America, Asia, and the Middle East. In the past, he also served on the board of World Affairs Council and served on the Advisory Board of the Center for Iranian Music at the College of Fine Arts, Carnegie Mellon University.

He frequently advised Iranian political and economic establishments on trade and economic policy. In 2013 he advised presidential campaigns in Iran. Mr. Aliabadi was also instrumental in extending invitations to Senator Maria Cantwell and Kelly Ayotte, chairwoman and ranking member of the Subcommittee on Aviation Operations, Safety and Security of the United States Senate to visit Iran in November 2014 AirShow for Civil Aviation Operations, Safety and Security matters, and "the invitation will have nothing to do with the political atmosphere surrounding Tehran and Washington, as the two senators are solely expected to understand the environment in the Iranian aviation sector." In 2015, he was appointed as senior advisor to the Director of Strategic Initiatives of the Ministry of Foreign Affairs Institute of Political and International Studies in Tehran - Iran.

He co-founded ReadyAI, an AI education company that aims to promote AI education globally. The company provides educational resources, workshops, and curriculums to schools and individuals interested in learning about AI and its applications.

In addition to ReadyAI, Aliabadi co-founded the World Artificial Intelligence for Youth (WAICY) in 2018. The organization aims to inspire students worldwide to learn and apply AI to solve real-world problems. WAICY organizes the World Artificial Intelligence Competition for Youth, which encourages young people to use AI innovatively and has attracted participants from different countries worldwide.

He is the Director of Compassion in AI at Stanford University CCARE (The Center for Compassion And Altruism Research And Education) focusing on artificial intelligence systems serving humanity with ethics, empathy, and compassion.

== Social impact ==
Roozbeh is committed to realist political thought and beliefs in building pragmatic ties between business, educational and cultural communities, whether in the United States, Europe or Asia. Roozbeh also publishes his personal blog known as rooznote.com In an interview with AI Times Journal, Mr. Aliabadi discusses the issue of the digital divide and the future of the workforce. He is passionate about bringing Artificial Intelligence Education to every child regardless of geography. He co-founded ReadyAI, an AI education company that promotes AI education around the world. Roozbeh also cofounded WAICY (World Artificial Intelligence for Youth), Since 2018, the World Artificial Intelligence Competition for Youth has been inspiring students worldwide to learn and use AI to solve real-world problems.

== Publications ==
Roozbeh Aliabadi has authored the following books:

- Aliabadi, Roozbeh. AI & Us: Building a Future Centered on Trust, Compassion, and Human Values. 2025. ISBN 979-8-3139-6622-9
- Aliabadi, Roozbeh. Education for the Next Generation: Nurturing Effective Learning. 2024. ISBN 979-8-3299-5684-9
- Aliabadi, Roozbeh. Intro to AI for Parents: A Pocketbook: A Guide to Sparking Fun and Meaningful Conversations with Your Kids about Artificial Intelligence. 2025. ISBN 979-8-3095-2772-4
- Aliabadi, Roozbeh. Raising Kids in the Age of AI Companions: A Pocketbook for Understanding and Guiding AI Relationships at Home and in School 2025. ISBN 979-8285029922
