= Cry of the Peacock (novel) =

1991 novel by Gina B. Nahai

- Cover of first edition (hardcover)
- Author: Gina B. Nahai
- Language: English
- Genre: Historical fiction novel
- Publisher: Washington Square Press
- Publication date: April 30, 1991
- Publication place: United States
- Media type: Print (hardback & paperback)
- Pages: 341 pages
- ISBN: 978-0517574799
- Dewey Decimal: 813/.54
- LC Class: PS3552.A6713 C79 1991

Cry of the Peacock is the first novel from Gina B. Nahai and follows the story of a family of Jews through seven generations, from 1780s Persia to contemporary Iran. The book was published in 1991 by Crown Publishing Group in the United States and won several awards. It was an alternate selection of The Book of the Month Club and The Doubleday Book Club.

== Plot summary ==
Peacock, a 116-year-old woman, is captured by the Islamic Revolutionary Guard. Her story and that of a relatively unknown group of Jews, the oldest in the diaspora, unfold as she waits in her prison cell. Born in the Esfahan ghetto, Peacock was married off at age nine to the wealthy Solomon the Man. A decade later, she becomes the first woman of the ghetto ever to have left her husband. Peacock's family story goes back to Esther the Soothsayer, who appears in the dreams of her descendants.

The novel incorporates Persian stories and fables as well as historical figures such as Mossadeq (Mohammad Mosaddegh) and Ruhollah Khomeini (the Ayatollah Khomeini) and historic events.

== Reception ==
The book was the winner of the Phi Kappa Phi Award and the Los Angeles Arts Council Award for Fiction.

Critical response was mostly positive.
