= Reacting Gas Dynamics Laboratory =

Research institute at MIT

The Reacting Gas Dynamics Laboratory (RGD) is a research facility at the Massachusetts Institute of Technology in Cambridge, Massachusetts.

The RGD researches methods for deriving high-efficiency, low-carbon energy from hydrocarbon sources or hybridized with concentrated solar thermal energy through thermochemical conversion and combustion. The RGD receives funding from a number of sources both public and private. These include the U.S. Department of Energy, the Office of Naval Research, the Air Force Office of Scientific Research, BP, ENEL, Bosch GmbH, and the Ford Motor Company. The lab also is in collaborations with the King Fahd University of Petroleum and Minerals, the King Abdullah University of Science and Technology, and Masdar in Abu Dhabi, as well as other departments and faculty within MIT.

Specifically, the lab develops, validates and applies simulation techniques, from the submicron scale to full system scale, to engineer low-CO_{2} energy systems. Examples of the simulation work include studies of thermoacoustic instability and multiphysics multiscale simulations of entrained flow gasification. These simulations are supported by high-performance computing systems and high-resolution optical diagnostics. The long-term goals of the lab include innovation in clean combustion for propulsion and power, gasification for power and biofuel production, and oxy-combustion and electrochemical/thermochemical conversion in ion transport membrane reactors and high-temperature fuel cells.

The chief faculty director of the laboratory is Prof. Ahmed Ghoniem of MIT's Mechanical Engineering Department.
