= List of Arab Americans =

This is a list of Arab Americans. It includes prominent and notable Arab American individuals from various fields, such as business, science, entertainment, sports and fine arts.

== Academia ==
=== Science ===
- Abdel-Moniem El-Ganayni, Egyptian, nuclear physicist, former senior scientist at Bettis Atomic Power Laboratory
- Adah al-Mutairi, Saudi, inventor and scholar in nanotechnology and nanomedicine
- Adam Hamawy, Egyptian, reconstructive surgeon and former United States Army combat surgeon
- Adel Mahmoud, Egyptian, former president of the Merck & Co. vaccine division and Princeton University professor; led development of HPV, rotavirus, and shingles vaccines
- Afaf Meleis, Egyptian, nurse-scientist and Dean Emerita of Nursing at the University of Pennsylvania; developed "Transitions Theory"
- Ahmed I. Zayed, Egyptian, mathematician at DePaul University; works on mathematical analysis and signal processing
- Ahmed Zewail, Damanhour-born Egyptian scientist, known as the "father of femtochemistry", winner of the 1999 Nobel Prize in Chemistry
- Albert Fathi, Egyptian, mathematician at the Georgia Institute of Technology specializing in dynamical systems; Sophie Germain Prize winner
- Ali S. Hadi, Egyptian, statistician and emeritus professor at Cornell University
- Anthony Atala, Peruvian-born Lebanese, Director of the Wake Forest Institute for Regenerative Medicine
- Ayaad Assaad, Egyptian, microbiologist and toxicologist, formerly at USAMRIID
- Elias J. Corey, Lebanese, organic chemistry professor at Harvard University, winner of the 1990 Nobel Prize in Chemistry
- Eman Ghoneim, Minea-born Egyptian, space scientist in desert regions
- Essam Heggy, Libyan-born Egyptian, Planetary scientist
- Farouk El-Baz, Zagazig-born Egyptian, space scientist who worked with NASA to assist in the planning of scientific exploration of the Moon
- François M. Abboud, Egyptian, cardiologist and professor emeritus at the Carver College of Medicine, University of Iowa
- Frank Harary, Syrian, Mathematician who is widely recognized as one of the "fathers" of modern graph theory
- Hassan Aref, Egyptian, physicist and former Dean of Engineering at Virginia Tech; discovered chaotic advection
- Hassan Hathout, Egyptian, physician, professor of medicine, and writer on medical ethics and interfaith dialogue
- Huda Akil, Damascus-born Syrian, neuroscientist and medical researcher
- Huda Zoghbi, Beirut-born Lebanese, physician and medical researcher who discovered the genetic cause of the Rett syndrome
- Hunein Maassab, Damascus-born Syrian, professor of epidemiology and the inventor of the live attenuated influenza vaccine
- Irene Ghobrial, Egyptian, physician and professor at the Dana–Farber Cancer Institute and Harvard Medical School; multiple myeloma researcher
- Joanne Chory, Lebanese, plant biologist and geneticist
- Karam Soliman, Egyptian, pharmacologist and Distinguished Professor at Florida A&M University
- Kareem El-Badry, Egyptian, astrophysicist at the California Institute of Technology; discovered Gaia BH1, the nearest known black hole
- Kareem Mohamed Abu-Elmagd, Egyptian, organ transplant surgeon at Case Western Reserve University; pioneer of intestinal transplantation
- Khaled J. Saleh, Egyptian, orthopaedic surgeon specializing in joint replacement surgery
- M. Amin Arnaout, Sidon-born Lebanese, nephrologist and biologist
- Maha Ashour-Abdalla, Egyptian, professor of physics and astronomy at UCLA; space plasma physics researcher
- Mahmoud ElSohly, Egyptian, pharmacologist at the University of Mississippi; director of the Marijuana Research Project
- Marty Makary, Egyptian, surgeon and professor at the Johns Hopkins School of Medicine; bestselling author of The Price We Pay
- Mary Bishai, Egyptian, physicist at Brookhaven National Laboratory; co-spokesperson of the Deep Underground Neutrino Experiment
- Michael E. DeBakey, Lebanese, cardiovascular surgeon and researcher, 1963 Lasker Award laureate
- Michael Mina, Egyptian, epidemiologist and immunologist formerly at Harvard T.H. Chan School of Public Health; advocate of rapid antigen testing during the COVID-19 pandemic
- Michel Barsoum, Egyptian, materials scientist at Drexel University; known for MAX phases and MXenes
- Michel T. Halbouty, Lebanese, geologist and geophysicist; pioneer in oil field research
- Miriam Merad, French-born Algerian, immunologist
- Mohamed Noor, Egyptian, geneticist and professor of biology at Duke University
- Mona N. Fouad, Egyptian, physician and cancer disparity researcher at the University of Alabama at Birmingham; member of the National Academy of Medicine
- Mostafa El-Sayed, Egyptian US National Medal of Science laureate; nanoscience researcher; known for the spectroscopy rule named after him, the El-Sayed rule
- Mounir Laroussi, Sfax-born Tunisian, plasma physicist, pioneer of plasma medicine
- Mourad Ismail, Egyptian, mathematician at the University of Central Florida; expert in orthogonal polynomials and special functions
- Nagui Achamallah, Egyptian, psychiatrist and painter
- Nagwa El-Badri, Egyptian, immunologist and director of the Center of Excellence in Stem Cells and Regenerative Medicine
- Noureddine Melikechi, Thénia-born, Atomic, Molecular, and Optical Physicist, member of the Mars Science Laboratory
- Omar M. Yaghi, Amman-born Jordanian, reticular chemistry pioneer; winner of the 2018 Wolf Prize in Chemistry
- Rania Awaad, Egyptian, psychiatrist and Clinical Professor of Psychiatry at Stanford University; Muslim mental health
- Riad Barmada, Aleppo-born Syrian, served as the president of the Illinois Orthopedic Society
- Rushdi Said, Egyptian, geologist and author of The Geology of Egypt
- Sadek Hilal, Egyptian, Columbia University radiologist and pioneer in imaging science
- Said Ghabrial, Egyptian, professor of plant pathology at the University of Kentucky; authority on mycoviruses
- Samy El-Shall, Egyptian, endowed professor of chemistry at Virginia Commonwealth University; nanostructured materials and catalysis
- Sarafina Nance, Egyptian, astrophysicist and science communicator at UC Berkeley
- Shadia Habbal, Homs-born Syrian, astronomer and physicist specialized in Space physics
- Shahinaz Gadalla, Egyptian, physician-scientist and cancer epidemiologist at the National Cancer Institute
- Sherif Zaki, Egyptian, pathologist and longtime Centers for Disease Control and Prevention infectious-disease expert (Ebola, Zika, COVID-19)
- Tarek Omar Souryal, Egyptian, orthopedic surgeon, former team doctor for the Dallas Mavericks
- Wafaa El-Sadr, Egyptian, University Professor of Epidemiology and Medicine at Columbia University; founder of ICAP; MacArthur Fellowship recipient
- Wafik El-Deiry, Egyptian, physician-scientist and director of the Legorreta Cancer Center at Brown University; discovered the p21 gene
- Yasmine Belkaid, Algiers-born Algerian, immunologist, professor and a senior investigator at the National Institute of Allergy and Infectious Diseases
- Zakya Kafafi, Egyptian, research fellow at Lehigh University; first woman to direct the National Science Foundation Division of Materials Research

=== Engineering/computer science ===
- Abbas El Gamal, Cairo-born Egyptian electrical engineer, educator and entrepreneur, the recipient of the 2012 Claude E. Shannon Award
- Ahmed Ghoniem, Egyptian, professor of mechanical engineering at MIT; directs the Center for Energy and Propulsion Research
- Ahmed Hassanein, Egyptian, Distinguished Professor of Nuclear Engineering at Purdue University; expert in fusion materials and nanolithography
- Ahmed Sameh, Egyptian, computer scientist at Purdue University; pioneer in parallel numerical algorithms and high-performance computing
- Ahmed Tewfik, Cairo-born Egyptian electrical engineer, Professor and college administrator
- Ali H. Nayfeh, Tulkarm-born Palestinian, mechanical engineer, the 2014 recipient of Benjamin Franklin Medal in mechanical engineering
- Amr El Abbadi, Egyptian, Distinguished Professor of Computer Science at the University of California, Santa Barbara; IEEE and ACM fellow
- Ayman El-Baz, Egyptian, bioengineer and chair of Bioengineering at the University of Louisville; medical imaging and computer-aided diagnosis
- Azer Bestavros, Egyptian, computer scientist and Associate Provost for Computing & Data Sciences at Boston University
- Bahgat G. Sammakia, Egyptian, Vice President for Research at Binghamton University and former interim president of SUNY Polytechnic Institute
- Charbel Farhat, Lebanese-American, Vivian Church Hoff Professor of Aircraft Structures in the School of Engineering and inaugural James and Anna Marie Spilker Chair of the Department of Aeronautics and Astronautics, at Stanford University; Member of the National Academy of Engineering (US); Member of the Royal Academy of Engineering (UK); and Member of the Lebanese Academy of Sciences
- Charles Elachi, Rayak-born Lebanese, professor of electrical engineering and planetary science at Caltech and the former director of the Jet Propulsion Laboratory
- Dina Katabi, Damascus-born Syrian, Professor of Electrical Engineering and Computer Science at MIT and the director of the MIT Wireless Center.
- Elias Zerhouni, Nedroma-born Algerian, former director of the National Institutes of Health
- Fadi Chehadé, Egyptian, technology executive, founder of RosettaNet and former CEO of ICANN
- Fawwaz T. Ulaby Damascus-born Syrian, professor of Electrical Engineering and Computer Science, former Vice President of Research for the University of Michigan; first Arab-American winner of the IEEE Edison Medal
- Gamal Refai-Ahmed, Egyptian, engineer known for thermal management and advanced packaging work at AMD, GE, Cisco, and Nortel
- Hany Farid, Egyptian Professor of computer science at Dartmouth College, pioneer in Digital forensics
- Hassan K. Khalil, Egyptian, electrical engineer and University Distinguished Professor Emeritus at Michigan State University; nonlinear control
- Hassan Kamel Al-Sabbah, Nabatieh-born Lebanese, technology innovator. He received 43 patents.
- Heba Kadry, Egyptian, mastering engineer who has worked with Björk and Ryuichi Sakamoto
- Helmy Eltoukhy, Egyptian, electrical engineer and co-founder/CEO of Guardant Health; liquid biopsy pioneer
- Jerrier A. Haddad, Syrian, computer engineer who worked with IBM.
- John Makhoul, Deirmimas-born Lebanese, computer scientist who works in the field of speech and language processing.
- Kawthar Zaki, Egyptian, electrical engineer and professor emerita at the University of Maryland, College Park; microwave engineering
- Medhat Haroun, Egyptian, earthquake engineering expert and former Provost of the American University in Cairo
- Moeness Amin, Egyptian, professor at Villanova University; recipient of the IEEE Dennis J. Picard Medal
- Mohamed Abdou, Egyptian, nuclear engineer and director of the Fusion Science and Technology Center
- Mohamed El-Genk, Egyptian, Distinguished Professor of Nuclear Engineering at the University of New Mexico; space nuclear power expert
- Mohamed Fayad, Egyptian, software engineering professor known for software patterns and software stability
- Mohamed Gad-el-Hak, Egyptian, professor of biomedical engineering at Virginia Commonwealth University; author of The MEMS Handbook
- Mohamed Hashish, Egyptian, mechanical engineer who invented the abrasive waterjet cutter
- Mohammad S. Obaidat, Irbid-born Jordanian, computer science/engineering academic and scholar
- Mona Diab, Egyptian, computer scientist and director of Carnegie Mellon University's Language Technologies Institute; natural language processing
- Mona Zaghloul, Egyptian, professor of electrical and computer engineering at George Washington University; integrated circuits and MEMS
- Mootaz Elnozahy, Egyptian, computer scientist, former IBM researcher and Dean at KAUST
- Mostafa Ammar, Egyptian, Regents' Professor of Computer Science at Georgia Institute of Technology; ACM and IEEE Fellow
- Moustafa Youssef, Egyptian, computer scientist and ACM/IEEE Fellow; pioneer in indoor location tracking
- Munther A. Dahleh, Tulkarm-born Palestinian, Professor and Director at Massachusetts Institute of Technology
- Nabih Youssef, Egyptian, structural engineer and leader in seismic engineering; retrofit of Los Angeles City Hall
- Oussama Khatib, Aleppo-born Syrian, roboticist and a professor of computer science
- Ramez Elmasri, Egyptian, computer scientist and co-author of widely used database textbooks
- Ramez Naam, Egyptian, computer scientist, futurist, and science fiction author of the Nexus Trilogy; former Microsoft executive
- Reda Mankbadi, Egyptian, aeroacoustics specialist and former Dean of Engineering at Embry-Riddle Aeronautical University
- Sherief Reda, Egyptian, professor of engineering at Brown University; energy-efficient computing and electronic design automation
- Tahani Amer, Egyptian, aerospace engineer and senior executive at NASA; NASA Exceptional Service Medal recipient
- Taher ElGamal, Cairo-born Egyptian cryptographer, inventor of the ElGamal discrete log cryptosystem and the ElGamal signature scheme
- Tarek Abdelzaher, Egyptian, computer scientist at the University of Illinois Urbana–Champaign; cyber-physical systems and the Internet of things
- Tarek El-Bawab, Egyptian, telecommunications engineer and former editor-in-chief of IEEE Communications Magazine
- Waguih Ishak, Egyptian, engineer, former chief technologist at Corning Inc. and adjunct professor at Stanford University
- Yaser Abu-Mostafa, Egyptian, professor at Caltech; co-founder of the NeurIPS conference and author of Learning From Data
- Youssef Marzouk, Egyptian, professor of aeronautics and astronautics at MIT; uncertainty quantification and Bayesian inference

=== Humanities ===
- Ahmed Rashad Abdel-khalik, Egyptian, accounting scholar at the University of Illinois Urbana–Champaign
- Ahmed Subhy Mansour, Egyptian, Islamic scholar and founder of the Quranist movement; former Visiting Fellow at Harvard Law School
- Alan Mikhail, Egyptian, historian and Chace Family Professor of History at Yale University; specialist in Ottoman and environmental history
- Alex Hanna, Egyptian, sociologist and director of research at the Distributed AI Research Institute; co-author of The AI Con
- Alexander Badawy, Egyptian, Egyptologist and professor of art history at UCLA
- Charles Issawi, Egyptian, economist and historian of the Middle East at Columbia University and Princeton University
- Dina H. Sherif, Egyptian, executive director of the MIT Kuo Sharper Center for Prosperity and Entrepreneurship at MIT
- Donny George Youkhanna, Habbaniyah-born Iraqi, archaeologist, anthropologist, author, curator, and scholar, and a visiting professor at Stony Brook University in New York
- Edward Said, Jerusalem-born Palestinian, literary theorist and former professor at Columbia University
- Ella Shohat, professor, author and activist
- Emad Shahin, Egyptian, political scientist specializing in political Islam; former professor at Georgetown University and Columbia University
- Fadwa El Guindi, Egyptian, anthropologist, author of The Myth of Ritual and By Noon Prayer
- Fathi Osman, Egyptian, Islamic scholar and author on Islamic reform, pluralism, and human rights
- Fouad Ajami, Arnoun-born Lebanese, Professor of International Relations
- Gawdat Bahgat, Egyptian, political scientist at the National Defense University; energy security and nuclear proliferation
- Georges Abi-Saab, Egyptian, professor of international law and international judge
- Hala Halim, Egyptian, academic and translator in Middle Eastern and Islamic Studies at New York University
- Hasan M. El-Shamy, Egyptian, folklorist and professor emeritus at Indiana University Bloomington
- Henri Dorra, Egyptian, art historian and Professor Emeritus at the University of California, Santa Barbara; specialist in French Symbolist art
- Hisham Sharabi, Jaffa-born Palestinian, Professor Emeritus of History
- Ibrahim Abu-Lughod, Jaffa-born Palestinian, former Director of Graduate Studies at Northwestern University, father of Lila Abu-Lughod
- Ibrahim Oweiss, Egyptian, economist and Professor Emeritus at Georgetown University; coined the term "Petrodollar"
- Ihab Hassan, Egyptian, literary theorist foundational to the study of postmodernism; professor at the University of Wisconsin–Milwaukee
- Imad-ad-Dean Ahmad, teaches religion, science, and freedom at the University of Maryland, College Park; directs the Minaret of Freedom Institute
- Ismail al-Faruqi, Jaffa-born Palestinian, philosopher, professor
- Joseph Massad, Jordan-born Palestinian, Professor at Columbia University known for his work on nationalism and sexuality in the Arab world
- Khaled Abou El Fadl, Egyptian, Distinguished Professor in Islamic Law at the UCLA School of Law; leading authority on Shari'ah
- Laila Shereen Sakr, Egyptian, digital media theorist and artist at the University of California, Santa Barbara; founder of the R-Shief digital lab
- Laura Nader, cultural anthropologist
- Leila Ahmed, Egyptian, professor at Harvard Divinity School and foundational scholar in Islamic feminism; author of Women and Gender in Islam
- Leila Farsakh, Jordan-born Palestinian, Professor of Political Science at the University of Massachusetts, Boston
- Lila Abu-Lughod, Palestinian, professor of Anthropology and Women's and Gender Studies at Columbia University
- M. Cherif Bassiouni, Egyptian, emeritus professor of law at DePaul University and leading scholar of international criminal law
- Majid Khadduri, Mosul-born Iraqi, academic and founder of the Paul H. Nitze School of Advanced International Studies Middle East Studies program
- Mark A. Gabriel, Egyptian, lecturer and author of books critical of Salafi Islam
- Mary-Jane Deeb, Egyptian, Middle East expert and former Chief of the African and Middle Eastern Division at the Library of Congress
- Matthew Shenoda, Egyptian, poet and university administrator; author of Somewhere Else and Tahrir Suite
- Mohammad Fadel, Egyptian, law professor at the University of Toronto Faculty of Law; Islamic law and economics
- Mohammed Adam El-Sheikh, Sudanese, executive director of the Fiqh Council of North America
- Mohammed Albakry, Egyptian, professor at Middle Tennessee State University and translator of contemporary Arabic literature
- Moustafa Bayoumi, Egyptian, writer and professor of English at Brooklyn College; author of How Does It Feel to Be a Problem?
- Muhammad S. Eissa, Egyptian, author and lecturer of Arabic at the University of Chicago
- Muhsin Mahdi, Karbala-born Iraqi, Islamologist and Arabist.
- Nada Shabout, UK-born Palestinian-Iraqi, Professor of Art History at University of North Texas
- Nada Shabout, UK-born Palestinian-Iraqi, art historian and Assistant Professor at the University of North Texas
- Nadia Abu El Haj, Palestinian, Author & Professor of Anthropology at Barnard College and subject of a major tenure controversy case at Columbia University
- Nadia Hijab, Syria-born Palestinian, Journalist with Middle East Magazine and Senior Fellow at the Institute for Palestine Studies
- Naseer Aruri, Jerusalem-born Palestinian, Chancellor Professor of Political Science at University of Massachusetts, Dartmouth
- Nazli Choucri, Egyptian, political scientist at MIT; international relations and cyberpolitics
- Noha Radwan, Egyptian, scholar of comparative literature at the University of California, Davis
- Noura Erakat, Palestinian, human rights attorney and Assistant Professor at Rutgers University
- Philip Khuri Hitti, Shimlan-born Lebanese, historian of Arab culture and history
- Philip S. Khoury, Lebanese, Ford International Professor of History and Associate Provost at the Massachusetts Institute of Technology
- Ragui Assaad, Egyptian, professor at the Humphrey School of Public Affairs, University of Minnesota
- Ramzi Fawaz, Egyptian, professor of English at the University of Wisconsin–Madison; author of The New Mutants: Superheroes and the Radical Imagination of American Comics
- Rashid Khalidi, Palestinian, Professor of Modern Arab Studies at Columbia University
- Ronald Hamowy, Egyptian, intellectual historian associated with libertarianism; professor emeritus at the University of Alberta
- Rosemarie Said Zahlan, Egypt-born Palestinian, historian, journalist & author, sister of Edward Said
- Saad Eddin Ibrahim, Egyptian, sociologist and human rights activist; founder of the Ibn Khaldun Center for Development Studies
- Saad Z. Nagi, Egyptian, sociologist whose disability framework influenced the Americans with Disabilities Act
- Saadi Simawe, Diwaniyah-born Iraqi, translator, novelist and teacher
- Saddeka Arebi, Tripoli-born Libyan, professor of anthropology at UC Berkeley
- Sahar Aziz, Egyptian, Distinguished Professor of Law at Rutgers Law School; founder of the Center for Security, Race and Rights
- Samih Farsoun, Haifa-born Palestinian, sociology professor at the American University
- Samih Farsoun, Professor of sociology at American University and editor of Arab Studies Quarterly
- Steven Salaita, Jordanian-Palestinian, former Professor of English at Virginia Tech, winner of Myers Outstanding Book Award for the Study of Human Rights 2007
- Talal Asad, Medina-born Saudi, anthropologist at the CUNY Graduate Center.
- Tarek Masoud, Egyptian, Ford Foundation Professor of Democracy and Governance at the Harvard Kennedy School; author of Counting Islam
- Thomas L. Saaty, Assyrian-Iraqi, University Professor at the University of Pittsburgh
- Umar al-Mukhtar, Tobruk-born Libyan, Chair of Arab Culture at Georgetown University
- Waleed El-Ansary, Egyptian, scholar of comparative religion and Islamic economics at Xavier University

=== University presidents ===
- David Adamany, Lebanese, former president of the Temple University
- Donna Shalala, Lebanese, president of the University of Miami
- Joseph E. Aoun, Beirut-born Lebanese, president of Northeastern University
- Minouche Shafik, Egyptian, economist; former President of Columbia University, Director of the London School of Economics, and Deputy Governor of the Bank of England
- Mitch Daniels, Syrian, president of Purdue University
- Nido Qubein, Lebanese, president of High Point University
- Robert Khayat, Lebanese, chancellor of the University of Mississippi
- Safa Zaki, Egyptian, cognitive scientist and sixteenth president of Bowdoin College
- Tarek Sobh, Egyptian, engineer and president of Lawrence Technological University

== Business ==
- Adam Mosseri, Egyptian-Israeli, CEO of Instagram
- Ahmass Fakahany, Egyptian, chief executive of the Altamarea Group restaurant company
- Ahmed Bahgat Fattouh, Egyptian, businessman who founded the Bahgat Group and developed Dreamland
- Ahmed Zayat, Egyptian, entrepreneur and racehorse owner of American Pharoah
- Alec Gores, Israel-born Lebanese-Palestinian, founder of Gores Group; on the Forbes list of billionaires
- Ali Abdelaziz, Egyptian, mixed martial arts manager and founder of Dominance MMA Management
- Allen Adham, Egyptian, co-founder of Blizzard Entertainment.
- Amin Khoury, businessman and founder of B/E Aerospace
- Amr Awadallah, Egyptian, co-founder of Cloudera and former VP at Google
- Ayad B. Saad , Egyptian-American Businessman and Senior Vice President, Morgan Stanley.
- Charif Souki, Cairo-born Egyptian co-founder and former CEO of Cheniere Energy.
- Charlie Shrem, entrepreneur and bitcoin advocate (of Syrian descent)
- Christopher Sarofim, Egyptian, businessman and fund manager, chairman of Fayez Sarofim & Co.
- Douglas Jemal, real estate developer, co-founder of The Wiz (of Syrian descent)
- Efrem Harkham, Israel-born Iraqi-American, founder and CEO of LuxeHotels, owner of Luxe Rodeo Drive Hotel
- Emil Michael, Egyptian, former Chief Business Officer at Uber and technology advisor to the United States Department of Defense
- Farouk Shami, Ramallah-born Palestinian, founder of Farouk systems, a Houston-based company that manufactures hair care and spa products like CHI hair Irons
- Fayez Sarofim, Egyptian, billionaire fund manager, founder of Fayez Sarofim & Co., and part-owner of the Houston Texans
- Gamal Aziz, Egyptian, hospitality executive, former president of Wynn Macau and COO of Wynn Resorts
- George Joseph, Lebanese, billionaire founder of Mercury Insurance Group.
- Haim Saban, Egypt-born Israeli-American, television and media proprietor
- Hany Rashwan, Egyptian, technology entrepreneur and co-founder of Amun and 21Shares
- Helly Nahmad, billionaire art dealer (of Syrian descent)
- Huda Kattan, Iraqi, CEO of Huda Beauty
- Jack Hidary, Syrian, founder of AI and quantum technology company SandboxAQ.
- Jacques Nasser, Amyoun-born Lebanese, former president and CEO of Ford Motor Company (Lebanese)
- Jeff Sutton, billionaire real estate developer (of Syrian descent)
- Joe Jamail, businessman who was the wealthiest practicing attorney in America.
- John J. Mack, Lebanese, CEO of investment bank Morgan Stanley
- John Zogby, Lebanese, founder and current President/CEO of Zogby International
- Joseph Cayre, billionaire real estate developer (of Syrian descent)
- Joseph Jacobs, Australia-born Lebanese, founder of Jacobs Engineering, one of the engineering firms in the US
- Joseph Nakash, billionaire real estate developer, founder of Jordache (of Syrian descent)
- Joseph Sitt, real estate developer, founder of Thor Equities and Ashley Stewart (of Syrian descent)
- Lucie Salhany, Jordanian-Lebanese, former chairwoman of Fox Broadcasting Company.
- Magid Abraham, Mashghara-born Lebanese, market research expert and businessman
- Maloof family, Lebanese family who owns numerous business properties in the Western United States, majority owners of the Sacramento Kings and the Palms Casino Hotel in Paradise, Nevada
- Manuel Moroun, Lebanese, owner of CenTra, Inc., the holding company which controls the Ambassador Bridge and Michigan Central Depot
- Marcus Lemonis, Beirut-born Lebanese-Syrian, chairman and CEO of Camping World, Good Sam Enterprises and Gander Outdoors.
- Mario Kassar, Beirut-born Lebanese-Italian, formerly headed Carolco Pictures
- Michael Mina, Egyptian, Michelin-starred chef and restaurateur; founder of the Mina Group
- Mo Gawdat, Egyptian, former Chief Business Officer of Google X and author of Solve for Happy
- Mohamed A. El-Erian, Egyptian, CEO and co-CIO of PIMCO
- Najeeb Halaby, Syrian, former head of Federal Aviation Administration and CEO of Pan-American Airlines, and father of Queen Noor of Jordan
- Naseeb Saliba, Lebanese, billionaire global philanthropist, construction and real estate mogul, founder of Tutor-Saliba Corporation.
- Omar Hamoui, founder and CEO of Google AdMob (Syrian)
- Paul Orfalea, Lebanese, founder of Kinko's
- Peter Mallouk, Egyptian, billionaire founder of Creative Planning and owner of Sporting Kansas City
- Rana el Kaliouby, Egyptian, computer scientist, CEO of Affectiva, Researcher at MIT Media Lab, contributor to facial expression recognition research and technology development
- Ray R. Irani, Lebanon-born Palestinian, chairman and CEO of Occidental Petroleum
- Richard E. Rainwater, Lebanese, investor and fund manager
- Robert Khuzami, Lebanese, former director of the U.S. Securities and Exchange Commission
- Roger Tamraz, Egyptian, international banker and venture capital investor; chairman of NetOil
- Sadek Wahba, Egyptian, economist and founder of I Squared Capital
- Sam Gores, Israel-born Lebanese-Palestinian, founder of talent agency Paradigm Agency; on the Forbes list of billionaires
- Sam Moore, Beirut-born Lebanese, founder and president of Thomas Nelson Publishers, the largest worldwide distributor of the Bible
- Sam Yagan, Syrian, entrepreneur and business executive, co-founder of SparkNotes, eDonkey, OkCupid, and Techstars Chicago, also CEO of Match Group, including Tinder
- Sharif El-Gamal, Egyptian, real estate developer, chairman and CEO of Soho Properties; known for the proposed Park51 project
- Sonny Gindi, billionaire businessman, he founded along with his family Century 21 stores (of Syrian descent)
- Stanely Chera, billionaire New York real estate developer (of Syrian descent)
- Steve Jobs, half Syrian, head and co-founder of Apple
- Thomas J. Barrack Jr., Lebanese, businessman and founder of Colony Capital
- Tom Gores, Israel-born Greek-Lebanese, founder and CEO of Platinum Equity; on the Forbes list of billionaires (Palestinian-born of Lebanese descent)
- Tony Fadell, Polish-Lebanese, product development manager at Apple Inc., co-inventor of iPod and iPhone
- Will Ahmed, Egyptian, founder and CEO of WHOOP

== Arts and entertainment ==
- Adam Saleh, Yemeni, YouTuber and singer
- Ali Selim, Egyptian, film and television director
- André Hakim, Egyptian, Hollywood film producer (Mr. Belvedere Rings the Bell)
- Asaad Kelada, Egyptian, television director of Who's the Boss?, The Facts of Life, and Family Ties
- Basil Gogos, Egyptian, illustrator known for movie-monster covers of Famous Monsters of Filmland
- Bobby Chinn, Egyptian, chef, television presenter, and judge on Top Chef Middle East
- Callie Khouri, Lebanese, Academy Award-winning screenwriter
- Casey Kasem, Lebanese Druze, radio personality and voice actor, co-founder of American Top 40 franchise,
- Cherien Dabis, Palestinian, film director
- Dan Jbara, Lebanese, television and film producer
- Deana Haggag, Egyptian, arts leader, former President and CEO of United States Artists
- Diane Rehm, Syrian-Lebanese, host and executive producer of The Diane Rehm Show on National Public Radio
- Diane Tuckman, Egyptian, silk artist and co-founder of Silk Painters International
- Dina Amer, Egyptian, film director of You Resemble Me
- Dora Khayatt, Egyptian, painter of portraits, landscapes, and seascapes
- Elie Samaha, Zahlé-born Lebanese, film producer
- Emile Kuri, Mexico-born Lebanese, Academy Award-winning art director
- Emilio Nicolás Sr., Palestinian-American television executive
- Fouad Said, Egyptian, film producer, cinematographer, and inventor of the Cinemobile
- Frank Agrama, Egyptian, director and producer, founder of Harmony Gold USA and creative force behind Robotech
- Gabbie Hanna, Lebanese, comedian, actress, YouTube personality, singer
- George Noory, Lebanese, radio broadcaster of late-night paranormal-themed radio talk show Coast to Coast AM
- Ghada Amer, Egyptian, artist known for embroidered paintings addressing gender and sexuality
- Hadji Ali, Egyptian, vaudeville performer known for controlled regurgitation acts
- Heba Amin, Egyptian, visual artist known for the subversive graffiti action on the set of Homeland
- Hesham Issawi, Egyptian, writer and director of AmericanEast and Cairo Exit
- Iman Le Caire, Egyptian, dancer, actress, choreographer, and LGBTQ activist
- Issa Twaimz, Palestinian, YouTuber
- Jehane Noujaim, Lebanese-Egyptian, documentary film director
- Jordan Nassar, half-Palestinian, visual artist working with Palestinian embroidery
- Joy Garnett, Egyptian, visual artist and writer exhibited at MoMA
- Karim Amer, Egyptian, film producer and director (The Square, The Great Hack, The Vow)
- Kerri Kasem, Lebanese, radio personality
- Kevin Hanna, Syrian, writer, director and producer; creator of the film The Clockwork Girl
- Kris Straub, Egyptian, web cartoonist and creator of the analog horror series Local 58
- Laila Gohar, Egyptian, artist and designer known for food-based installations and the brand Gohar World
- Mario Kassar, Beirut-born Lebanese, film producer, founder of Carolco Pictures
- Moustapha Akkad, Syrian-American film producer and director
- Nessa Diab, Egyptian, Radio and TV personality and television host
- Osgood Perkins, Egyptian, filmmaker and actor who directed Longlegs and The Blackcoat's Daughter
- Ramy Romany, Egyptian, Egyptologist, documentarian, and TV host
- Remi Kanazi, Palestinian, performance poet
- Rima Fakih, Srifa-born Lebanese, Miss USA 2010
- Sam Abbas, Egyptian, film director of The Wedding and Alia's Birth
- Sam Esmail, Egyptian, screenwriter, director and producer; creator of the television series Mr. Robot
- Sam Maloof, Lebanese furniture designer and woodworker
- Sanaa Hamri, Tangier-born Moroccan, music video and movie director; her films include the Sisterhood of the Traveling Pants 2
- Sarah Farahat, Egyptian, artist who created the We Choose Love mural memorializing the 2017 Portland train attack
- Sherin Guirguis, Egyptian, visual artist based in Los Angeles
- Sofie Dossi, YouTuber, singer, actress, contortionist, aerialist, dancer and internet personality
- Sonya Tayeh, award-winning dancer and choreographer.
- Tom Shadyac, Lebanese, director, screenwriter and producer
- Tony Thomas, Lebanese, producer
- Wael Abdelgawad, Egyptian, novelist and martial artist, author of Pieces of a Dream
- William Peter Blatty, Lebanese, Academy Award-winning screenwriter and writer
- Yousef Abu-Taleb, Jordanian, actor, lonelygirl15; film producer
- Yousef Erakat, Palestinian, YouTuber and actor
- Zaida Ben-Yusuf, UK-born Algerian, portrait photographer

=== Actors ===
- Alanna Masterson, half Lebanese, actress,
- Alexander D'Arcy, Egyptian, film actor
- Alia Shawkat, half-Iraqi, actress on Arrested Development
- Amy Yasbeck, part-Lebanese, actress
- Anissa Jones, Lebanese, actress, Family Affair
- Antonio Cipriano, Lebanese, actor and singer
- C. K. Alexander, Egyptian, actor, director, composer, and playwright
- Catherine Keener, Lebanese, actress
- Christopher Maher, Egyptian, actor (Men in Black) turned James Beard Foundation Award-recognized chef
- Danny Thomas, Lebanese, Emmy Award-winning actor, founder of St. Jude Children's Research Hospital; father of Marlo Thomas
- Demián Bichir, Mexico-born Lebanese, Academy Award-nominated actor
- Edy Ganem, half-Lebanese, actress
- Emeraude Toubia, Canada-born part-Lebanese, actress
- F. Murray Abraham, Syrian-American, Academy Award-winning actor (Amadeus)
- George Nader, Lebanese, American film and television actor.
- Gregory Jbara, Lebanese, television and film actor
- Haaz Sleiman, Beirut-born Lebanese, television and film actor
- James Stacy, part-Lebanese, actor
- Jamie Farr, Lebanese, character actor
- Jenna Dewan, Lebanese, film/TV actress (Step Up)
- John Kassir, Syrian-Iraqi, American actor, voice actor and comedian
- Jonathan Roumie, Egyptian, actor who portrays Jesus in The Chosen
- Kathy Najimy, Lebanese, actress
- Khigh Dhiegh, Egyptian, actor best known as Wo Fat on Hawaii Five-O
- Khrystyne Haje, Lebanese, actress on Head of the Class
- Kristy McNichol, Lebanese, two-time Emmy Award-winning actress
- Marlo Thomas, Lebanese, Golden Globe and Emmy Award-winning actress
- May Calamawy, Egyptian, actress known for Ramy and Moon Knight
- Mena Massoud, Egyptian, actor who played the title role in Disney's Aladdin (2019)
- Michael Ansara, Lebanon-born, actor
- Michael Nouri, half-Iraqi, actor
- Mo Gallini, half-Lebanese, actor
- Nadia Dajani, half-Palestinian, actress
- Najee Mondalek, Lebanon-born, actor/playwright
- Omar Elba, Egyptian, actor who co-starred in A Hologram for the King
- Omar Metwally, Egyptian, actor
- Paola Turbay, part-Lebanese, actress
- Rami Malek, Egyptian, Emmy Award and Academy Award - winning actor for Bohemian Rhapsody
- Ramy Youssef, Egyptian, writer and star of Ramy
- Rose Abdoo, half-Lebanese, comedian, actress
- Rowan Blanchard, Syrian, actress
- Salma Hayek, Mexico-born Lebanese, Mexican actress
- Sammy Sheik, Alexandria-born Egyptian, actor
- Sayed Badreya, Egyptian, actor (Iron Man, Three Kings) and advocate for authentic Arab representation
- Shannon Elizabeth, Syrian-Lebanese, film actress (American Pie, Scary Movie)
- Shereen Ahmed, Egyptian, actress and singer who played Eliza Doolittle in the Lincoln Center Theater revival of My Fair Lady
- Sofia Boutella, Algerian, actress, model, and Hip-hop dancer
- Susu Tobia, Lebanese and Jordanian, American actress
- Teri Hatcher, Syrian, actress
- Tige Andrews, Syrian, Emmy-nominated actor
- Tony Shalhoub, Lebanese, three-time Emmy Award-winning television actor on Monk
- Vic Tayback, Syrian, two-time Golden Globe-winning actor
- Vince Vaughn, part-Lebanese, actor
- Waleed Zuaiter, Palestinian, actor
- Wendie Malick, Egyptian, actress
- Wentworth Miller, UK-born Lebanese-Syrian, actor on Prison Break
- Yasmine Al Massri, Egyptian, actress known for Quantico and Caramel
- Zeeko Zaki, Egyptian, actor

=== Comedians ===
- Ahmed Ahmed, Helwan-born Egyptian, actor and comedian
- Anwar Jibawi, Palestinian, YouTuber and comedian
- Aron Kader, half-Palestinian, stand-up comedian
- Bassem Youssef, Egyptian, comedian, Doctor, and stand-up comedian
- Brian Awadis, Iraqi, YouTuber and actor
- Dean Obeidallah, half-Palestinian, stand-up comedian, writer
- Dina Hashem, Egyptian, stand-up comedian and Emmy-nominated writer for The Daily Show
- Emil Wakim, half-Lebanese, stand-up comedian
- Jerry Seinfeld, half-Syrian Jewish, stand-up comedian, actor and writer
- Joe DeRosa, Egyptian, stand-up comedian and actor (Dr. Caldera on Better Call Saul)
- Kareem Rahma, Egyptian, comedian and creator/host of Subway Takes
- Kassem G, Amman-born Jordanian-Egyptian, comedian, actor, and YouTuber
- Maysoon Zayid, Palestinian, actress and comedian
- Mo Amer, Palestinian, stand-up comedian, actor and writer
- Mohammed Amer, Kuwait-born Palestinian, comedian, writer, actor; Rolling Stone, Al Barnameg, Allah Made Me Funny
- Ray Hanania, Palestinian, journalist and stand-up comedian
- Remy Munasifi, Iraqi-Lebanese, comedian also known as GoRemy
- Ronnie Khalil, Egyptian, stand-up comedian
- Sammy Obeid, Palestinian writer, YouTuber and stand-up comedian

=== Reality show ===
- Adrienne Maloof, half-Lebanese, businesswoman, television personality, cast member of The Real Housewives of Beverly Hills
- Aja (entertainer), Egyptian-Moroccan, known for competing on RuPaul's Drag Race
- Farrah Abraham, part-Syrian, reality television personality, participated in 16 and Pregnant and Teen Mom
- Laith Al-Saadi, half-Iraqi, finalist on the 10th season of The Voice (American TV series)
- Tarek El Moussa, part-Lebanese, businessman, television personality, cast member of Flip or Flop
- Tareq Salahi, half-Palestinian, television personality, appeared on The Real Housewives of D.C.

=== Fashion designers ===
- Joseph Abboud, Lebanese, menswear fashion designer and author
- Norma Kamali, Lebanese, fashion designer
- Rami Kashou, Palestinian, fashion designer
- Reem Acra, Beirut-born Lebanese, fashion designer

=== Models ===
- Amy Fadhli, half-Iraqi, fitness model, actress and winner of the Fitness America National Champion 1996
- Bella Hadid, half-Palestinian, supermodel and TV personality
- Charlotte Wassef, Egyptian, beauty queen, Miss Egypt and Miss Universe 1935
- Gigi Hadid, half-Palestinian, supermodel and TV personality
- Jaclyn Stapp, Jordanian, beauty queen and fashion model
- Wafah Dufour, half-Saudi, fashion model and singer

=== Musicians ===
- Alissa Musto, half-Lebanese singer/pianist
- Aly Tadros, Egyptian, singer-songwriter blending folk, pop, Mexican, and Middle Eastern influences
- Andrew Bazzi, half-Lebanese, singer-songwriter
- Ayad Al Adhamy, Bahraini-born, synthesizer player and multi-instrumentalist musician
- Dave Hall, Quarter-Lebanese, singer/songwriter and composer
- David Yazbek, half-Lebanese, songwriter and musician
- Diamanda Galás, Egyptian, experimental vocalist, composer, and performance artist
- Dick Dale, half-Lebanese, surf rock guitarist
- DJ Khaled, Palestinian, hip-hop DJ, rapper, music producer
- Emilio Estefan, Cuba-born half Syrian-Lebanese, manager and producer of wife Gloria Estefan
- Ferras, half-Jordanian, singer-songwriter
- Frank Zappa, part-Lebanese, musician
- Fredwreck, Palestinian, hip hop producer
- French Montana, Casablanca-born Moroccan, rapper
- G.E. Smith, half-Lebanese, lead guitarist in the band Hall & Oates; musical director of Saturday Night Live
- Halim El-Dabh, Egyptian, composer and pioneer of electronic music; created one of the first works of tape music in 1944
- Jack Barakat, Lebanese, All Time Low guitarist/songwriter
- Jeff Becerra, death metal musician
- Kareem Salama, Egyptian, country singer-songwriter and musician
- Kurtis Mantronik, Jamaica-born half-Syrian, born Kurtis el Khaleel, remixer and producer, founding member of 1980s old school hip hop group Mantronix
- Lara Scandar, Egyptian, singer who rose to fame on Star Academy
- Malek Jandali, Germany-born Syrian, composer and pianist (Syrian-American)
- Mohammed Fairouz, musician, composer
- Nomi Abadi, Egyptian, composer, pianist, and vocalist known for work on Marvel's Thunderbolts*
- Odetari, Palestinian, rapper, singer, songwriter, and record producer
- Omar Fadel, Egyptian, composer for film, television, and video games (Assassin's Creed IV: Black Flag)
- Osama Afifi, Egyptian, jazz bassist who has performed with Yanni and Kurt Elling
- Paul Anka, Lebanese and Syrian, singer/songwriter
- Paul Jabara, Lebanese, actor, singer, songwriter
- Paula Abdul, half-Syrian Jewish, singer, musician, writer, actress, and television personality
- Queen Naija, half-Yemeni, singer and songwriter
- Raef Haggag Egyptian, singer
- Raoul Poliakin, Egyptian, arranger and conductor who appeared on albums by Frank Sinatra, Perry Como, and Bing Crosby
- Raymond Ibrahim, Egyptian, author and translator on Arabic history and Middle Eastern affairs; author of Sword and Scimitar
- RedOne, Tetouan-born Moroccan, producer, songwriter, music executive
- Ron Affif, half-Lebanese, jazz guitarist and musician
- Soraya, part-Lebanese, singer/songwriter
- Stephan Said, half-Iraqi, singer, musician, writer and activist
- Sylvain Sylvain, Syrian Jewish, rock guitarist, member of the New York Dolls
- Tiffany, born Tiffany Renee Darwish, half-Lebanese, singer
- Tiny Tim (born Herbert Khaury), half-Lebanese, musician

== Literature ==
- Abd al-Masih Haddad, Homs-born Syrian, writer of the Mahjar movement and journalist
- Abraham Rihbany, Shweir-born Lebanese, writer on politics and religion
- Ahmed Zaki Abu Shadi, Egyptian, Romantic poet, publisher, physician, and bee scientist
- Alicia Erian, Egyptian, novelist, author of The Brutal Language of Love and Towelhead
- Ameen Rihani, Syria-born Lebanese, "father of Arab American literature," member of the New York Pen League and author of The Book of Khalid, the first Arab American novel in English;
- André Aciman, Egyptian, writer, author of Call Me by Your Name and the memoir Out of Egypt
- Carole Naggar, Egyptian, poet and photography historian
- Claire Messud, half-Algerian, author
- Diana Abu-Jaber, half-Jordanian, novelist and professor, author of Arabian Jazz and Crescent
- Edward Said, Jerusalem-born Palestinian, literary theorist, thinker, and the founder of the academic field of postcolonial studies.
- Elia Abu Madi, Bikfaya-born Lebanese, poet, publisher and member of the New York Pen League
- Elmaz Abinader, Lebanese, poet, playwright, memoirist, writer
- Etel Adnan, Lebanon-born half-Syrian, poet, essayist, and visual artist
- Hisham Matar, Libyan, Pulitzer Prize-winning writer
- Huda Fahmy, Egyptian, graphic novelist; Huda F Cares? was a National Book Award for Young People's Literature finalist
- Ibtisam Barakat, Jerusalem-born Palestinian, award-winning writer and poet
- Kareem James Abu-Zeid, Egyptian, translator of contemporary Arabic poetry and literature
- Khaled Mattawa, Benghazi-born Libyan, poet, recipient of an Academy of American Poets award
- Khalil Gibran, Bsharri-born Lebanese, writer, poet, and member of the New York Pen League; the third-best-selling poet of all time.
- Laila Lalami, Rabat-born Moroccan, Pulitzer Prize-nominated novelist, journalist, essayist, and professor
- Lawrence Joseph, Syrian-Lebanese, poet
- Lisa Suhair Majaj, Palestinian, poet and literary scholar
- Lucette Lagnado, Egyptian, The Wall Street Journal journalist and author of The Man in the White Sharkskin Suit
- Mikhail Naimy, Baskinta-born Lebanese, member of the New York Pen League; well-known works include The Book of Mirdad and a biography of Khalil Gibran
- Mona Simpson, half-Syrian, novelist; author of Anywhere but Here
- Naomi Shihab Nye, half-Palestinian, poet
- Nasib Arida, Homs-born Syrian, poet and writer of the Mahjar movement.
- Pauls Toutonghi, Egyptian, writer, author of Red Weather, Evel Knievel Days, and Dog Gone
- Rachel Wahba, Egyptian, writer and psychotherapist focused on Mizrahi and Sephardic Jewish identity
- Randa Jarrar, Egyptian, novelist, essayist, and translator
- Raymond Khoury, Beirut-born Lebanese, screenwriter and novelist, best known as the author of the 2006 New York Times bestseller The Last Templar
- Reem Kassis, Jerusalem-born Palestinian, writer on food, culture and politics
- Sabah Khodir, Egyptian, poet and activist
- Saladin Ahmed, Lebanese-Egyptian, Eisner Award-winning comic book and fantasy writer
- Samuel John Hazo, half-Lebanese, State Poet of Pennsylvania
- Sharifa Yazmeen, Egyptian, playwright and theatre director; inaugural winner of the Barbara Whitman Award
- Stephen Adly Guirgis, Egyptian, Pulitzer Prize-winning playwright
- Stephen Karam, Lebanese, Tony Award-winning playwright and screenwriter
- Steven Naifeh, Iran-born half-Lebanese, Pulitzer Prize-winning author
- Steven Salaita, Jordanian-Palestinian, expert on comparative literature and post-colonialism, writer, activist
- Suheir Hammad, Jordan-born Palestinian, poet, playwright, artist, Tony Award winner
- Ted Naifeh, comic book writer and artist.
- Victor Hassine, Egyptian, attorney and author of Life Without Parole on prison reform
- William Peter Blatty, Lebanese, writer best known for his 1971 horror novel The Exorcist
- Yasmin Mogahed, Egyptian, author, educator, and Muslim speaker
- Yussef El Guindi, Egyptian, playwright of Back of the Throat and Pilgrims Musa and Sheri in the New World

== Media and journalism ==
- Anthony Shadid, Lebanese, Pulitzer Prize-winning journalist, foreign correspondent
- Ayman Mohyeldin, Cairo-born Palestinian-Egyptian, journalist for NBC News
- Claude Salhani, Egyptian, photojournalist and editor for United Press International and Reuters
- Daoud Kuttab, Bethlehem-born Palestinian, award-winning journalist; Ferris Professor of Journalism at Princeton University
- Dena Takruri, Palestinian, journalist, on-air presenter, and producer
- Diane Rehm, American public radio talk show host
- Fawaz Gerges, Beirut-born Lebanese, ABC analyst and regular guest on "Oprah's Anti-war series"
- Hala Gorani, Syrian, journalist and anchor of CNN's International Desk; Levantine Cultural Center
- Hannah Allam, Egyptian, journalist covering the Middle East and national security for The Washington Post and NPR
- Helen Thomas, Lebanese, reporter, columnist, and White House correspondent
- Hoda Kotb, Egyptian, broadcast journalist and TV host on Dateline NBC and the Today Show
- Jamal Dajani, Jerusalem-born Palestinian television producer and Middle East analyst
- Jim Avila, half-Lebanese, correspondent for ABC News "20/20",
- Lorraine Ali, Iraqi, reporter, editor, culture writer and music critic for Newsweek
- Maryam Henein, Egyptian, filmmaker and journalist who directed Vanishing of the Bees
- Maryana Iskander, Egyptian, social entrepreneur and CEO of the Wikimedia Foundation
- Meena Dimian, Egyptian, broadcaster, writer, and television personality
- Mohammed Elshamy, Egyptian, photojournalist
- Mona Eltahawy, Port Said-born Egyptian, freelance journalist
- Nancy Youssef, Egyptian, national security correspondent for The Wall Street Journal
- Nasser Weddady Mauritanian, activist, Director of Civil Rights Outreach at American Islamic Congress
- Omar El Akkad, Egyptian, novelist and journalist, author of American War and the Giller Prize-winning What Strange Paradise
- Paul Ajlouny, Ramallah-born Palestinian, founder of the Palestinian newspaper Al-Fajr
- Paula Faris, half Lebanese television correspondent and personality
- Rawya Rageh, Egyptian, journalist and former Al Jazeera English correspondent
- Ray Hanania, Palestinian, award-winning journalist; Managing Editor of The Arab Daily News; President and CEO of Urban Strategies Group media and political consultants
- Serena Shim, Lebanese, journalist for Press TV
- Shadi Hamid, Egyptian, author and political scientist on political Islam and democracy in the Middle East
- Susan Chira, Syrian, journalist, former New York Times editor, foreign correspondent
- Walid Phares, Batroun-born Lebanese, Fox News correspondent, Middle Eastern policy advisor to the 2012 Mitt Romney presidential campaign and the 2016 Donald Trump presidential campaign
- Yasmeen Sami Alamiri, Iraqi, journalist, first member of the White House foreign press pool

== Military ==
- Ahmed Qusai al-Taayie, Iraqi-born, specialist in the United States Army who was kidnapped by insurgents in Baghdad, Iraq, on October 23, 2006
- Florent Groberg, France-born part-Algerian
- George Joulwan, Lebanese
- James Jabara, Lebanese
- John Abizaid, Lebanese
- Michael A. Monsoor, part-Lebanese, first Arab American Medal of Honor awardee
- Nathan Badeen, Syrian
- Peter Mansoor
- Ray Hanania, Palestinian, Vietnam Era Military Service, U.S. Air Force

== Politics ==
- Abdul El-Sayed, Egyptian, physician and public-health official; United States Senator-elect from Michigan
- Abraham Kazen, Lebanese, U.S. Congressman (D-Texas) (1967–1985)
- Allan Mansoor, Egyptian, Republican former member of the California State Assembly and Mayor of Costa Mesa
- Amir Hatem Mahdy Ali, Egyptian, United States district judge for the United States District Court for the District of Columbia
- Amr Hamzawy, Egyptian, political scientist and former member of the Egyptian parliament
- Andrew S. Boutros, Egyptian, lawyer and United States Attorney for the Northern District of Illinois
- Aya Hijazi, Egyptian, social activist and co-founder of the Belady Foundation
- Brigitte Gabriel, Marjayoun-born Lebanese, pro-Israel activist and founder of the American Congress For Truth
- Charles Boustany, Lebanese, U.S. Representative from Louisiana; cousin of Victoria Reggie Kennedy
- Charlie Crist, part-Lebanese, former Governor of Florida (R) (2007–2011), U.S. Congressman (D-Florida) (2017–present)
- Chris John, part-Lebanese, U.S. Congressman (D-Louisiana) (1997–2005)
- Chris Sununu, Lebanese-Palestinian, Governor of New Hampshire (R) (2017–2025), son of Governor John H. Sununu
- Dalia Mogahed, Egyptian, researcher, former advisor to President Barack Obama; Director of Research at the Institute for Social Policy and Understanding
- Darin LaHood, part-Lebanese, U.S. Congressman (R-Illinois) (2015–), son of Ray Lahood
- Darrell Issa, half-Lebanese, U.S. Congressman (R-California) (2001–)
- Debbie Mucarsel Powell, part-Lebanese, U.S. Representative (D-Florida) (2019–21)
- Dina Powell, Cairo-born Egyptian, current U.S. Deputy National Security Advisor for Strategy
- Donna Shalala, Lebanese, U.S. Secretary of Health and Human Services (1993–2001), U.S. Representative (D-FL) (2019–21)
- Edward Rafeedie, Palestinian, U.S. District Judge for the Central District of California
- Erika Kirk, half-Lebanese, CEO of Turning Point USA
- Gamal Helal, Egyptian, senior diplomatic interpreter who served four U.S. presidents
- George Helmy, Egyptian, former U.S. Senator from New Jersey and Chief of Staff to Governor Phil Murphy
- George J. Mitchell, half-Lebanese, U.S. Senator (D-Maine) (1980–1995) US special envoy to the Middle East under the Obama administration, U.S. senator from Maine, Senate Majority Leader
- George Joulwan, part-Syrian, retired general, former NATO commander-in-chief
- George Kasem, Lebanese, U.S. Congressman (D-California) (1959–1961)
- Hady Amr, Beirut-born Lebanese, diplomat, founding director of Brookings Doha Center (Lebanese father)
- Ismael Ahmed, Egyptian, co-founder of ACCESS and former director of the Michigan Department of Human Services
- James Abdnor, Lebanese, U.S. Senator (R-South Dakota) (1981–1987)
- James Abourezk, Lebanese, U.S. Senator (D-South Dakota) (1973–1979)
- James Jabara, Lebanese, colonel and Korean War flying ace
- James Zogby, half-Lebanese, founder and president of the Arab American Institute
- Jeanine Pirro, Lebanese, former Westchester County District Attorney and New York Republican attorney general candidate
- Jill Kelley, Beirut-born Lebanese, global advocate and American socialite
- Jimmy Naifeh, Lebanese, Speaker of the Tennessee House of Representatives (D)
- Joe Jamail, Lebanese, Renown American trial lawyer and billionaire, also known as the "King of Torts"
- John Abizaid, Lebanese, retired general
- John Baldacci, half-Lebanese, Governor of Maine (D) (2003–2011)
- John E. Sununu, Lebanese-Palestinian, U.S. Senator (R-New Hampshire) (2003–2009)
- John H. Sununu, Cuba-born Lebanese-Palestinian, Governor of New Hampshire (R) (1983–1989) and Chief of Staff to George H. W. Bush
- Johnny Khamis, Palestinian, Council member from San Jose
- Justin Amash, Syrian-Palestinian, U.S. Representative (R-Michigan) (2011–2021)
- Lisa Halaby, Syrian, (a.k.a. Queen Noor), Queen-consort of Jordan and wife of King Hussein of Jordan
- Mary Rose Oakar, Lebanese-Syrian, U.S. Congresswoman (D-Ohio) (1977–1993)
- Mary-Katherine Stone, Egyptian, Democratic member of the Vermont House of Representatives
- Mo Elleithee, Egyptian, Democratic political campaign strategist
- Nancy Okail, Egyptian, democracy advocate and human-rights activist
- Nazli Sabri, Egyptian, first queen consort of the Kingdom of Egypt (1919–1936), wife of King Fuad I
- Nick Rahall, Lebanese, U.S. Congressman (D-West Virginia) (1977–2015)
- Pat Danner, Lebanese, U.S. Congresswoman from Missouri (1993–2001)
- Philip Charles Habib, Lebanese, Under Secretary of State for Political Affairs and Special Envoy to Ronald Reagan
- Ralph Nader, Lebanese, politician and consumer advocate, author, lecturer, and attorney, candidate for US Presidency
- Rana Abdelhamid, Egyptian, political candidate and community organizer; founder of Hijabis of New York and Malikah
- Rashida Tlaib, Palestinian, U.S. Congresswoman from Michigan (2019–present)
- Ray LaHood, half-Lebanese, U.S. Congressman (R-Illinois) (1995–2009), U.S. Secretary of Transportation (2009–2013)
- Rosemary Barkett, Mexico-born Syrian, U.S. Circuit Judge and the first woman Supreme Court Justice and Chief Justice for the state of Florida
- Selwa Roosevelt, Lebanese, former Chief of Protocol of the United States and wife of the late Archibald Bulloch Roosevelt Jr., grandson of President Theodore Roosevelt
- Shereef Elnahal, Egyptian, physician, former commissioner of the New Jersey Department of Health and U.S. Under Secretary of Veterans Affairs for Health
- Sherrie Mikhail Miday, Egyptian, judge on the Cuyahoga County Court of Common Pleas; first Egyptian-American elected judge in the U.S.
- Spencer Abraham, Lebanese, U.S. Secretary of Energy (2001–2005) and U.S. Senator (R-Michigan) Secretary of Energy under Bush (1995–2001)
- Troy Eid, Egyptian, attorney and former United States Attorney for the District of Colorado
- Victor G. Atiyeh, Syrian-Lebanese, former Governor of Oregon (R) (1979–1987)
- Victoria Reggie Kennedy, Lebanese, attorney and widow of late Senator Ted Kennedy
- Wael Ghonim, Egyptian, pro-democracy activist and administrator of the "We are all Khaled Said" page that helped spark the Egyptian Revolution of 2011
- Zainab Salbi, Baghdad-born Iraqi, co-founder and president of Women for Women International

== Sports ==
- Abdel Nader, Alexandria-born Egyptian, player for the Oklahoma City Thunder of the National Basketball Association (NBA)
- Abe Mickal, Talia-born Lebanese, football player for LSU
- Adam Shaheen, tight end from Ashland (Lebanese-Palestinian Father)
- Adnan Al-Kaissie, former professional wrestler and manager (Iraqi)
- Ahmed Elmaghraby, Egyptian, Olympic field hockey player for the United States
- Ahmed Hassanein, Egyptian, defensive end for the Detroit Lions; first player of Egyptian heritage selected in the NFL draft
- Ahmed Hussein, Egyptian, two-time Olympic backstroke swimmer and All-American at Arizona State University
- Ahmed Kaddour, professional boxer, from NBC show The Contender (Lebanese)
- Alaa Abdelnaby, Alexandria-born Egyptian, played for Duke and five years in the NBA
- Amanda Sobhy, Egyptian, professional squash player; highest-ranked American in history (world No. 3)
- Amir Khillah, Egyptian mixed martial artist and The Ultimate Fighter contestant (Egyptian)
- Amr Aly, Egyptian, retired soccer player, 1984 Hermann Trophy winner
- Armando Estrada, professional wrestler and manager ( Palestinian)
- Bill George, NFL player and Hall of Fame inductee.
- Bobby Rahal, half-Lebanese, former racing driver and motorsports executive
- Brandon Saad, half-Syrian, NHL player
- Brian Habib, NFL player (Lebanese father)
- Damien Sandow, WWE wrestler (Lebanese)
- Dina Al-Sabah, professional figure competitor (Kuwaiti descent)
- Doug Flutie, half-Lebanese, NFL player
- Drew Haddad, Jordanian, NFL player
- Ed Farhat, Lebanese-American professional wrestler best known by his ring name The Sheik
- Farid Simaika, Egyptian, Olympic diver, silver and bronze medalist at the 1928 Summer Olympics
- Farida Osman, Egyptian, three-time Olympian swimmer and World Championship bronze medalist
- Faryd Mondragón, MLS player for Philadelphia Union (Lebanese parents)
- Frank Kalil, former American football offensive lineman.
- Gibran Hamdan, half-Palestinian, NFL QB
- Graham Rahal, (Lebanese ancestry)
- Hocine Khalfi, professional boxer, Algerian-American
- Ismail Elfath, Moroccan-born American Soccer Referee. 4th official for the 2022 FIFA World Cup final.
- Isra Girgrah, boxer
- Jamil El Reedy, Egyptian, alpine skier, first athlete to represent Egypt at the Winter Olympics (1984)
- Jeff George, Lebanese, NFL quarterback
- Joe Lahoud, MLB player for Boston and California (Lebanese descent)
- Joe Robbie, former owner and founder of the NFL's Miami Dolphins
- John Jaha, MLB baseball player (Lebanese)
- Johnny Manziel, part-Lebanese, NFL player
- Justin Abdelkader, part-Jordanian, ice hockey forward playing in the NHL
- Justin Meram, MLS player for Columbus Crew (Chaldo-Assaryian)
- Kareem Al Allaf (born 1998), American tennis player of Syrian descent who has played for Syria and the US
- Kelly Slater, professional surfer, shredder (Lebanese descent)
- Khalid Khannouchi, athlete marathon runner (Moroccan)
- Mansoor, WWE wrestler (Saudi Arabian father)
- Mark Seif, Egyptian, professional poker player with two World Series of Poker bracelets
- Matt Kalil, half-Lebanese, NFL player
- Mikie Mahtook, Major League Baseball outfielder (Lebanese descent)
- Mohamed Aly, Egyptian, boxer, Super Heavyweight silver medalist at the 2004 Summer Olympics
- Mohamed Hamza, Egyptian, foil fencer and three-time Olympian
- Mojo Rawley, professional wrestler currently signed to WWE (Palestinian and Syrian)
- Muhammad Halim, (Palestinian father)
- Naseem Hamed, commonly known as Prince Naseem or Naz, former boxer, former featherweight world champion (Yemeni parents)
- Nayel Nassar, Egyptian, professional show jumping rider
- Oday Aboushi, Palestinian, NFL player
- Omar Hassan, pro skateboarder
- Omar Jarun, former professional football player (Palestinian father)
- Omar Samhan, Egyptian professional Basketball player (Egyptian father)
- Omar Sheika, (Palestinian), professional boxer, four-time world title challenger
- Patrick Maroon, Lebanese, ice hockey player for the Edmonton Oilers in the NHL
- Ramsey Nijem, (Palestinian), mixed martial artist and UFC fighter
- Rich Kotite, retired NFL tight end; NFL Head coach for the Philadelphia Eagles and New York Jets
- Robert Saleh, head coach for New York Jets NFL (Lebanese descent).
- Rocco Baldelli, professional baseball player (Syrian)
- Rony Seikaly, Beirut-born Lebanese, former NBA player, now DJ
- Ryan Kalil, NFL player (Lebanese father)
- Sabrina Sobhy, Egyptian, professional squash player and Harvard University standout
- Salah Mejri, Oued Melliz-born Tunisian professional basketball for the Dallas Mavericks of the NBA
- Sam Khalifa, Egyptian MLB baseball player
- Sami Guediri, footballer (Algerian parents)
- Sarah Attar, track and field athlete (Saudi Arabian father)
- Skandor Akbar, former professional wrestler (Lebanese)
- Soony Saad, MLS player (Lebanese descent)
- Tarek Saleh, NFL player (Palestinian father)
- Tarick Salmaci, professional boxer (Lebanese)
- Toni Breidinger, half-Lebanese, NASCAR driver, first female Arab in the sport

== Others ==
- Adam Shoemaker, Egyptian, Episcopal clergyman
- Ahmed Ibrahim, Egyptian, New York City taxi driver known as the "Cupid Cabbie"
- Anwar al-Awlaki, believed by US officials to be a recruiter involved in planning terrorist operations for the Islamist militant group al-Qaeda (Yemeni)
- Candice Lightner, founder of MADD (Lebanese mother)
- Charles Bishop, suicide by plane crash in Tampa, Florida; grandson of Syrian immigrant
- Edward L. Masry, lawyer (Lebanese descent)
- Feisal Abdul Rauf, Egyptian, Sufi imam known for the Cordoba House project
- Hussein Ibish, writer, journalist, advocate for Arab causes in the United States (Lebanese)
- Jacqueline Isaac, Egyptian, Coptic attorney and human rights activist
- James Zogby, Arab-American civil rights activist (Arab-American Institute); brother of John (Lebanese descent)
- Joe Arridy, falsely convicted and wrongfully executed for rape and murder in 1936 (Lebanese)
- John Zogby, pollster for Zogby International (Lebanese descent)
- Karim Rashid (Egyptian-born)
- Karine Bakhoum, Egyptian, culinary publicist known as "The Iron Palate"; judge on Iron Chef America
- Michael Youssef, Egyptian, evangelical pastor and founder of Leading the Way
- Nadya Suleman, "Octomom", father is Iraqi
- Naser Jason Abdo, former soldier convicted of planning an attack near Fort Hood
- Nidal Hasan, former soldier convicted of the 2009 Fort Hood shooting (Palestinian descent)
- Nihad Awad, founding executive director of largest Muslim civil rights organization in the U.S., the Council on American–Islamic Relations (Palestinian)
- Rasmea Odeh, convicted of immigration fraud for concealing her arrest, conviction, and imprisonment for fatal terrorist bombing (Palestinian)
- Rosemary Barkett, federal judge and first woman Justice and Chief Justice on the Florida Supreme Court (Syrian)
- Saint Raphael of Brooklyn, first Orthodox bishop to be consecrated in North America; born Raphael Hawaweeny in Beirut of Damascene Syrian parents
- Sami Al-Arian, professor guilty of conspiracy to contribute services to or for the benefit of a Specially Designated Terrorist organization (Palestinian)
- Shereef Akeel, Egyptian, civil rights lawyer who led lawsuits on behalf of Abu Ghraib prison abuse victims
- Sirhan Sirhan, convicted murderer of Robert F. Kennedy (Palestinian with Jordanian citizenship)
- Tawfik Hamid, Egyptian, Muslim reformer, physician, and author of Inside Jihad
- Walid Rabah, publisher
- Zain Masri, technology executive
- Zainab Salbi, co-founder and president of Women for Women International (Iraqi)

== See also ==
- List of Egyptian Americans
- List of Iraqi Americans
- List of Lebanese Americans
- List of Palestinian Americans
- Syrian Americans
- Yemeni-American
