= Hunein Maassab =

American medicine professor (1926–2014)

- Born: June 11, 1926; Damascus, Syria
- Died: February 1, 2014 (aged 87); North Carolina, United States
- Education: University of Michigan
- Known for: Inventing the Live attenuated influenza vaccine
- Scientific career
- Fields: Epidemiology

Hunein (John) Maassab (Arabic: حنين معصّب) (born Hunein Maassab) was a Syrian-American professor of epidemiology known for developing the live attenuated influenza vaccine

Maassab was born June 11, 1926, in Damascus, Syria, he immigrated to the United States in the late 1940s and started using the name John. Maassab received his Bachelor of Arts in 1950 and Master of Arts 1952 University of Missouri. This was followed by Master of Public Health in 1954 and a Ph.D. in 1956 from the University of Michigan.

In 1956, Maassab worked as an assistant researcher in the University of Michigan Department of Epidemiology, becoming a research associate in 1957, an assistant professor in 1960, an associate professor in 1965, and a full professor in 1973. He served as epidemiology chairman between 1991-1997 and founded and was the first director of the school's Hospital and Molecular Epidemiology Program. In February 2003 he was named professor emeritus of epidemiology.

Maassab first isolated the Influenza Type-A-Ann Arbor virus in 1960 and by 1967 had developed a cold-adapted virus. His research lasted 40 years and resulted in FluMist, a cold-adapted, live attenuated, trivalent influenza virus vaccine. In June 2003, the Food and Drug Administration declared FluMist (the brand of the vaccine) safe for healthy people between the age of 5 to 49 who are not pregnant, then it was approved for children as young as 2.

Massab died on February 1, 2014, at his home in North Carolina.
