= Rawya Rageh =

Egyptian journalist (born 1981)

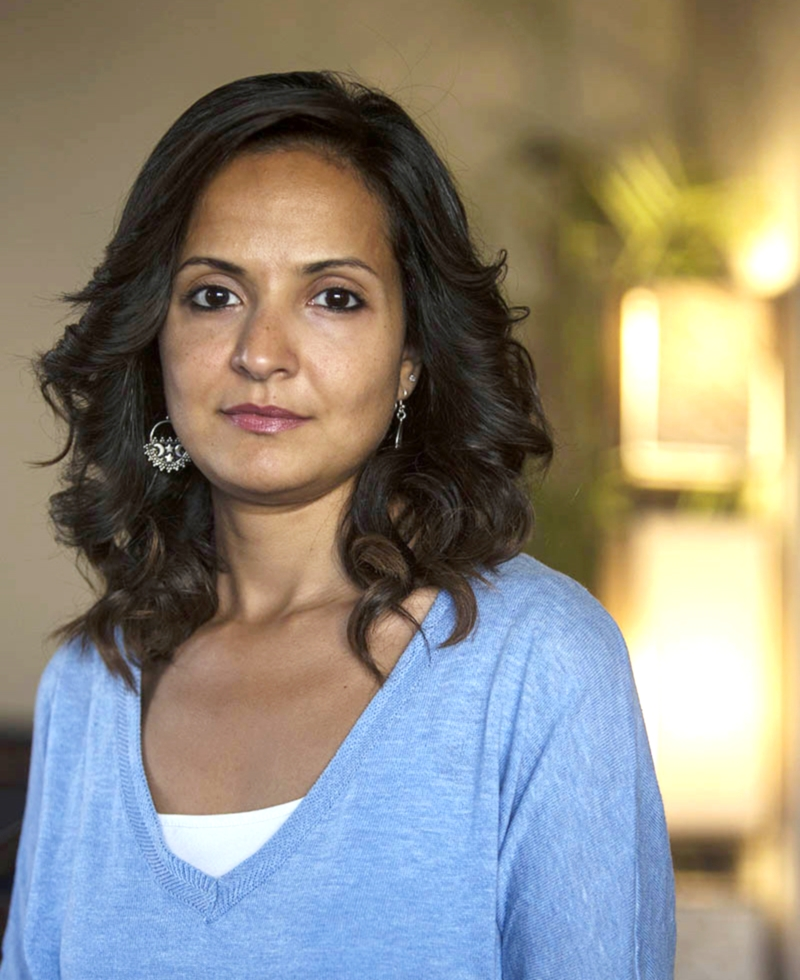
- Born: Rawya Rageh; Cairo, Egypt
- Education: American University in Cairo; Columbia University
- Occupation: Broadcast journalist
- Years active: 2006–present
- Notable credit(s): Al Jazeera English Correspondent (2006–2015); Associated Press Reporter (2001–2006)

Rawya Rageh (Arabic: راوية راجح) is an Egyptian journalist and Senior Crisis Adviser for Amnesty International based in New York City. She was previously a broadcast journalist known for her in-depth coverage of notable stories across the Middle East and Africa, including the Iraq War, the Darfur crisis in Sudan, the Saddam Hussein trial, the Arab Spring, and the Boko Haram conflict in Northern Nigeria. Working as a correspondent for the Al Jazeera English network her contribution to the Peabody Award-winning coverage the network provided of the Egyptian Revolution of 2011 and the Arab Spring was documented in the books 18 Days: Al Jazeera English and the Egyptian Revolution and Liberation Square: Inside the Egyptian Revolution and the Rebirth of a Nation. The news story she broadcast on 25 January, the first day of the Egyptian Revolution of 2011, was selected by Columbia University Graduate School of Journalism as one of the "50 Great Stories" produced by its alumni in the past 100 years. In addition to her broadcast reporting, Rageh is an active social media journalist, recognized by the Washington Post as one of "The 23 Accounts You Must Follow to Understand Egypt" and by Forbes Middle East Magazine as one of the "100 Arab personalities with the most presence on Twitter."

== Early career ==
=== 2001–2006 ===
Rageh began her journalism career as an intern for the Associated Press News Agency while still a student at the American University in Cairo. Following the September 11 attacks she began working for the agency in earnest. She provided reporting from Egypt, the United States, Iraq, Sudan, Kenya, Lebanon, Qatar, Saudi Arabia, Bahrain and the United Arab Emirates for several large-scale stories including Egypt's role in the US lead "war on terror", the Iraq War, the trial of Saddam Hussein, and the war in Darfur. In January 2004 she became the first AP newswoman to cover the annual Hajj Pilgrimage in Saudi Arabia

Rageh completed her Masters of Journalism in 2006 at the Ivy League Columbia University Graduate School of Journalism in New York, with an emphasis on broadcast journalism.

=== Television ===
Rageh was recruited by the newly formed 24-hour news network Al Jazeera English, and began work as a producer for the channel for its launch in November 2006. She began to regularly appear on-air by 2008, reporting on stories such as attacks in Egypt's Sinai peninsula, and the 2008 Egyptian general strike in Mahalla. In 2010, the channel designated her their full-time Iraq reporter in charge of the Baghdad Bureau.

== Egyptian revolution of 2011 and the Arab Spring ==
On 25 January 2011, Rawya Rageh was the sole Al Jazeera English reporter on the ground to cover the protests during what was the start of the Egyptian revolution of 2011. Her complete reporting experiences including her escape from an angry machete wielding pro-Mubarak mob in the port city of Alexandria has been documented in the book 18 Days: Al Jazeera English and the Egyptian Revolution, by Scott Bridges and Liberation Square: Inside the Egyptian Revolution and the Rebirth of a Nation, by Ashraf Khalil and her live tweets, often utilized by other news outlets in order to reflect the social media of that day, have been preserved in an archived collection maintained by the American University in Cairo Rare Books and Special Collections Library along with other recommended tweets, blogs, and local/regional media reports covering the Egyptian revolution.

She was live on air to report the 11 February resignation of former president Hosni Mubarak, reporting from outside the Al Ittihadia Presidential palace, and later that night from above a jubilant Tahrir Square. Minutes after Mubarak's resignation was announced, she said:

I am trying to gather the words, the sentences to describe to you the sentiment here, but it is simply indescribable. The moment the announcement [of Mubarak's resignation] was made, people were crying, they fell to their knees, praying immediately on the floor. The tears are everywhere, the smiles, the dancing. ... I'm 30 years old. ... All my years of life I have known one president and I can tell you I've never seen this sentiment on the streets of Egypt.

Rageh continued to cover the tumultuous post-revolutionary period in Egypt for the network until 2013.

As the Arab Spring continued, Rageh covered Arab League discussions regarding the unfolding events in the region for the network and reported on the Syrian Civil War from the Syria–Turkey border. Rageh's live Twitter coverage of the region was also frequently cited by major news outlets in their coverage of the regional events through social media.

== Reporting in Africa ==
Beginning in 2013 Rageh began reporting as a roving correspondent for Al Jazeera English in Nigeria and Kenya. Her reports from that time include such stories as the Boko Haram insurgency in Nigeria's north, attacks along the Kenyan-Somali border by the armed group Al Shabab, and the attempted coup in South Sudan.

== Amnesty International ==
On 17 October 2016 Rageh announced via Twitter she had joined Amnesty International as a Senior Crisis Adviser investigating human rights abuses in emergencies.

== Honors and awards ==
- 2006 – Dan Eldon Scholarship Award – Overseas Press Club Foundation
- 2006 – Foreign Press Association Scholarship
- 2012 – Peabody Award for Al Jazeera English team coverage of Arab Awakening – Henry W. Grady College of Journalism and Mass Communication, University of Georgia
- 2014 – Columbia Graduate Journalism School's 100 Great Stories reported by Alum
- 2014 – Panelist Berlin Documentary Forum 3
- 2014 – Dart Center Ochberg Fellowship
