= Najee Mondalek =

Lebanese-American actor

Najee Mondalek is a Lebanese-American actor who is the founder of AJYAL Theatrical group. Also, he has been called the Jerry Seinfeld of Arab-American culture after he was known for playing the role of Im Hussein in many plays just like, Shoufou alwawa wayn and the play Arab and Broud."

== Biography ==
Born in Lebanon, Najee Mondalek grew up in a dreadful and unsecured environment where he spent much of his early childhood witnessing Lebanon's civil war. It was until 1985, as a teenager of 19 years old, that he immigrated to the United States where he attended Macomb Community College, Wayne State University, and Academy of Art University. Thereafter, he returned to Michigan to work for GM (General Motors) as a virtual-reality engineer.

== Career ==
In 1988 he founded the AJYAL Theatrical Group— the first Arab-American theatrical group to "take the show on the road" and perform for Arab-American audiences in The United States, Canada, Australia and the Middle East. The everyday lives of Arab-American, their mistakes and mishaps constitute the subject of Ajyal Theatrical Group' shows.

Ajyal has been the one constant for Mondalek. He writes a new show nearly every year. In September 1994, his theatrical life underwent a transformation. The centerpiece of his creative life, Im Hussein has become his Dame Edna, starring in six hit comedic plays since "Smile You Are in America," a comedy about immigrants trying to adjust to their new country. The main character was an older woman named Im Hussein. Three days before the first performance the father of the actress playing Im Hussein died. Mondalek couldn't find anyone to replace her. Thinking about Robin Williams as Mrs. Doubtfire and Dustin Hoffman as Tootsie, Mondalek took the part himself.

== Works ==
=== What a Shame ===
"Arabic قصّتنا قصّة حكايتنا جرصة" "translit: 8ossotna 8osa, 7kayetna Jorsa" was the first show performed by Ajyal Theatrical Group on May 12, 1989. Around that time in Lebanon there was a big problem: civil war. The first play Mondalek wrote was about that subject: Why people in Lebanon seemed unable to get together. The play was written in Arabic; its title in English was "What a Shame."

=== Students Nowadays ===
"Arabic تلاميذ آخر زمن" "translit: Talameez Akher Zaman" was scheduled to be performed in August 1990, but it coincided with the invasion of Kuwait and was postponed February 1991, but again was postponed due to the war in the Middle East. So many attempts were made to reschedule this show, but something always worked against it. his sister works at bridge. In the end, the group decided to wrap up this play, and the show was never performed. Five years later, on April 19, 1995 the group was scheduled to meet in the evening to discuss the possibility of performing this show again. That day, the federal building in Oklahoma city was bombed. The meeting was canceled, and no one in the group ever talked about this show again.

=== Honest Thieves ===
"Arabic حاميها حراميها" "translit: 7ameeha 7arameeha" was performed in the fall of 1991. The show was a musical drama and was a collaboration project between AJYAL Theatrical Group and Alanwar Dance Group. It was written and directed by Najee Mondalek.

=== Smile You'Re in Dearborn ===
"Arabic إبتسم أنت في ديربورن" "translit: Ibtasim Anta fee Dearborn" premiered in June 1993 in Dearborn, Michigan. It was the first play that AJYAL Theatrical Group presents that deal with social and cultural issues facing the Arab-American citizens in the United States. The show was videotaped but never been released. It was written and directed by Najee Mondalek.

=== Smile You're in America ===
"Arabic إبتسم أنت في أميركا" "translit: Ibtasim Anta fee America" premiered Saturday September 10, 1994 in Dearborn (Michigan) and was performed in 1994-1995 season. Written and directed by Najee Mondalek, It was the first show that AJYAL Theatrical Group released on videotape in June 1995 and on DVD in March 2005.

=== We Became American, Finally ===
"Arabic تأمركنا يا سندي" "translit: T2amrakna ya Sanadee" was performed in 1996-1997 season. The show was written and directed by Najee Mondalek and it was released on videotape in June 1998 and on DVD in March 2005.

=== Come See ... Come Saw ===
"Arabic تعا تفرّج تعا شوف" "translit: Ta3a Tfarraj Ta3a Chouf" was written and directed by Najee Mondalek, but has not been released on DVD yet. It's a very simple comedy portraying hundreds of newcomers who have faced some kind of problem with learning a new language and culture. Their mannerisms and slips-of-the-tongue carry humorous overtones. "Break a leg" is a term used in show business to wish a good luck to an actor or theatrical group. The "AJYAL Theatrical Group" don't like to use this term anymore. Two nights before the premier of "Come See.. Come Saw" in Detroit- Michigan, "Im Elias" (played by Michael Mondalek), had a car accident and broke her leg! She ended up performing her part on crutches. The show was a mix of skits and stand-up performances by Im Hussein, Im Elias and Abou Hussein.

=== Habby Bairday ===
"Arabic هبّي باردي" "translit: Habby Bairday" premiered Saturday 19, 2000. All designed to celebrate the 10th birthday of AJYAL's first theatrical production in the United States. The show was written and directed by Najee Mondalek, and was released on videotape in December 2001, and on DVD in March 2005.

=== Me No Terrorist ===
"Arabic أنا مش إرهابية" "translit: Ana Mich Irhabeeya" is a "Comedy that teaches that not all Arabs are bad guys" The play was written by Najee Mondalek and directed by Ray Alcodray. It was released on DVD in March 2005.

=== Arabic and Proud ===
" Arabic عربي و راسي مرفوع" "translit: 3arabee w Rasee Marfou3" was written by Najee Mondalek and directed by Ray Alcodray. "Arabic and Broud" was released on DVD in 2007.

=== Shoufou Alwawa Wayn ===
"Arabic شوفو الواوا وين" "translit: Shoufou Alwawa Wayn" premiered October 29, 2010 at the Ford Community & Performing Arts Center in Dearborn (Michigan). "Shoufou Alwawa Wayn" was written by Najee Mondalek, and directed by Ray Alcodray. The show is available on DVD.

=== Im Hussein's Jubilee Show ===
"Arabic سهرة اليوبيل" premiered May 30, 2013 at the Ford Community & Performing Arts Center in Dearborn (Michigan). The show is a combination of old and new skits written to celebrate AJYAL's 25th anniversary. The Show is available on DVD.

=== The Dumbass ===
"Arabic غاشي وماشي" "translit: Ghashee w Mashee" is AJYAL's latest production. The show premiered March 27, 2015 at the Ford Community & Performing Arts Center in Dearborn (Michigan). The show is written by Najee Mondalek and Directed by Aziz Charabaty. The show is available on DVD.
