= Jacqueline Isaac =

Coptic Egyptian-American attorney and activist

Jacqueline Isaac is a Coptic Egyptian-American attorney and human rights activist, focusing primarily on the rights of women and minorities in the Middle East.

== Career ==
Jacqueline Isaac is a lawyer and vice president of Roads of Success (ROS), a humanitarian NGO. As an American of Egyptian descent, Isaac has spent over a decade supporting those escaping crisis and advocating for the rights of refugees, minorities and women across the Middle East.

She has testified before the UK Parliament and U.S. Congress as to her experiences in the war-torn parts of Iraq and Syria, supporting resolutions that declare ISIL committed genocide against Yazidis, Christians and other minorities. She has been featured on BBC, C-SPAN, NBC, FOX, ABC, the Guardian, Huffington Post and other media outlets impacting public awareness and government policies. She has given several speeches at the UN headquarters, calling for the prosecution of ISIL and urging intervention. Isaac has testified before both the United States House Committee on Foreign Affairs regarding violent acts that constitute ISIS’ genocide against Christians, Yazidis and other religious minorities.

Isaac holds workshops and engages constitutional drafters in the Middle East pushing for fundamental rights and freedoms for women and minorities. She is currently advocating for constitutional safeguards and guarantees for displaced minorities at the Kurdistan Regional Government's (KRG) parliament, as a new constitution develops.

Isaac founded the Tech Over Trauma online education and counseling program which aims to utilize internet-technology to empower, educate, and counsel young women who have escaped ISIS captivity and survived severe traumatic experiences.

Isaac and the ROS team were inspired to set up the NGO's mentorship program for refugee children in the United States after discussing the impact of trauma on children with U.N. Secretary-General Ban Ki-moon during his visit in a refugee camp. Isaac partnered with the Jordan Hashemite Charity Organization, under the leadership of Prince Mired Raad Zeid Al-Hussein, to promote a relief campaign for Syrian refugees living in Jordan.

As a response to the Egyptian revolution, Isaac founded a movement aimed at promoting peace, interreligious unity and participation in civic dialogue in Egypt supported by religious leaders. She advised Safwat El-Baiady of the Evangelical Churches of Egypt, a delegate of the Constitutional Assembly appointed in drafting the new Egyptian Constitution.

Isaac received a Juris Doctor from the University of San Diego School of Law where she served as the President of the Human Rights Society. Isaac began studying at Vanguard University in California at age sixteen and graduated magna cum laude with a Bachelor of Arts in Political Science and Minor in Business Administration. She was the President of Pi Sigma Alpha, a political science honors society, and studied at Oxford University.

Upon her college graduation, she traveled through rural areas of Egypt developing a short documentary and project to decrease female genital mutilation by clearing up traditional misconceptions. Isaac was born and raised in Los Angeles, California and then moved to Egypt with her family as a teenager. She feels responsible to support people like her childhood friends and their families in the Middle East as they fight for basic rights and human dignity.

== Roads of Success ==
Isaac is the vice president of Roads of Success, a nonprofit organization based in southern California that works to "advance human rights in the Middle East."
