= Zain Masri =

Arab American technology executive

Zain Masri (Arabic: زين مصري;) is an American technology executive known for her contributions to the technology industry. She held various roles including marketing, product strategy and business development across YouTube and Google. Zain is the first woman of Palestinian and Jordanian descent to be named one of Forbes 30 Under 30.

== Early life ==
Zain is an American of Palestinian and Jordanian descent. She was born in Fairfax, Virginia. She is the eldest of four children. Her parents immigrated to the United States in the 1980s.

== Career ==
In 2014, Zain joined Google as an intern. Over the years, she held key executive roles at several technology companies, including YouTube and Google. She has led the launch of a number of initiatives to promote digital literacy and economic empowerment for women in the Arab world. Zain was recognized for launching Maharat min Google, a digital skills education program that has helped nearly 1 million people in the MENA region gain the skills they need to succeed in the digital economy. She also led the launch of YouTube Batala, a content hub featuring hundreds of female creators from the Arab world. The programs have been recognised by governments, businesses, and civil society organizations for their impact on women's economic empowerment.

In 2020, Zain became the first woman of Palestinian and Jordanian descent to be named one of Forbes' "30 Under 30". In 2021, she was featured as a documentary subject as part of Sky News Najahouna (Their Success) series. The same year, she became the first Arab woman to be nominated to the ADCOLOR Rockstar Awards, an initiative launched by the ADCOLOR Industry Coalition, to promote increased diversity in the advertising, marketing, and media industries. She also launched Tirazain.com, a digital archive of embroidery from the Arab world with the aim to document embroidery patterns while identifying their origin and making them accessible.
