= Mohamed Gad-el-Hak =

Professor of Biomedical Engineering

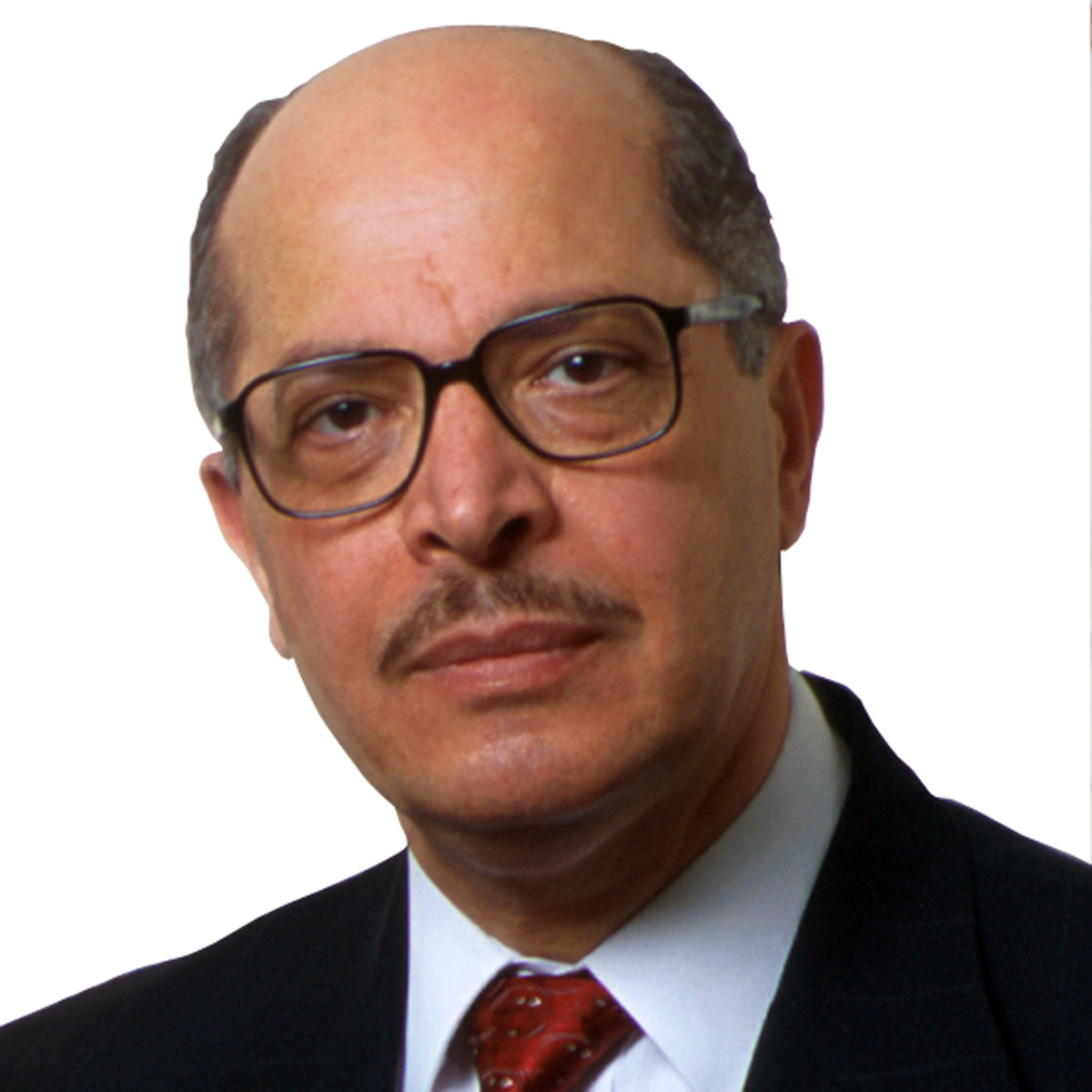
- Born: 11 February 1945 (age 81); Tanta, Egypt
- Education: Ain Shams University (BSc); Johns Hopkins University (PhD)
- Scientific career
- Fields: Classical mechanics, biomedical engineering, mechanical and nuclear engineering
- Website: gadelhak.github.io/-gadelhak

Mohamed Gad-el-Hak (born 1945) is an Egyptian-American engineering scientist. He is currently the Inez Caudill Eminent Professor of biomedical engineering and professor of mechanical and nuclear engineering at Virginia Commonwealth University.

== Biography ==
Gad-el-Hak was born on 11 February 1945 in Tanta, Egypt.

Gad-el-Hak was senior research scientist and program manager at Flow Research Company in Seattle, Washington, and then professor of aerospace and mechanical engineering at the University of Notre Dame, finally coming to Virginia Commonwealth University in 2002 as chair of mechanical engineering, subsequently expanded to mechanical and nuclear engineering. On retirement, he was granted emeritus status.

== Scientific work ==
Gad-el-Hak has developed diagnostic tools for turbulent flows, including the laser-induced fluorescence (LIF) technique for flow visualization, and discovered the efficient mechanism by which a turbulent region rapidly grows by destabilizing a surrounding laminar flow. His has also published on Reynolds number effects in turbulent boundary layers and on the fluid mechanics of microdevices.

Gad-el-Hak is the author of the book Flow Control: Passive, Active, and Reactive Flow Management, and editor of the books Frontiers in Experimental Fluid Mechanics, Advances in Fluid Mechanics Measurements, Flow Control: Fundamentals and Practices, The MEMS Handbook (three volumes), and Large-Scale Disasters: Prediction, Control, and Mitigation.

== Honors ==
Gad-el-Hak has been a member of several advisory panels for DOD, DOE, NASA, and NSF. During the 1991/1992 academic year, he was a visiting professor at Institut de Mécanique de Grenoble, France. During the summers of 1993, 1994, and 1997, he was, respectively, a distinguished faculty fellow at Naval Undersea Warfare Center, Newport, Rhode Island, a visiting exceptional professor at Université de Poitiers, France, and a Gastwissenschaftler (guest scientist) at Forschungszentrum Rossendorf, Dresden, Germany.

Gad-el-Hak is a fellow of the American Academy of Mechanics, a fellow of the American Physical Society, a fellow of the American Institute of Physics, a fellow of the American Society of Mechanical Engineers, a fellow of the American Association for the Advancement of Science, an associate fellow of the American Institute of Aeronautics and Astronautics, and a member of the European Mechanics Society. Gad-el-Hak served as editor of eight international journals, including AIAA Journal, Applied Mechanics Reviews, and Bulletin of the Polish Academy of Sciences. He is additionally a contributing editor for Springer-Verlag's Lecture Notes in Engineering and Lecture Notes in Physics, for McGraw-Hill's Year Book of Science and Technology, and for CRC Press's Mechanical Engineering Series.

An editorial in honor of Gal-el-Hak titled "Homage to a Legendary Dynamicist on His Seventy-Fifth Birthday" appeared in the July 2020 issue of the Journal of Fluids Engineering.

In 1998, Gad-el-Hak was named the 14th American Society of Mechanical Engineers (ASME) Freeman Scholar. In 1999, he was awarded the Alexander von Humboldt Prize as well as the Japanese Government Research Award for Foreign Scholars. In 2002, he was named ASME Distinguished Lecturer. Gad-el-Hak has also been awarded the ASME Medal for contributions to the discipline of fluids engineering, as well as a Certificate of Appreciation.

== Books ==
- Advances in Fluid Mechanics Measurements, Springer, 1989.
- Frontiers in Experimental Fluid Mechanicsa, Springer, 1989.
- Flow Control: Fundamentals and Practices ,Springer, first published 1998.
- Flow Control: Passive, Active, and Reactive Flow Management, Cambridge University Press, 2000.
- The MEMS Handbook ,CRC Press, multivolume edition.
- Large-Scale Disasters ,Cambridge University Press, 2008.

== Selected publications ==
- Gad-el-Hak, M., and Bandyopadhyay, P.R. (1994) "Reynolds Number Effects in Wall-Bounded Flows," Applied Mechanics Reviews, vol. 47, pp. 307–365.
- Sen, M., Wajerski, D., and Gad-el-Hak, M. (1996) "A Novel Pump for MEMS Applications," Journal of Fluids Engineering, vol. 118, pp. 624–627.
- Gad-el-Hak, M. (1999) "The Fluid Mechanics of Microdevices—The Freeman Scholar Lecture," Journal of Fluids Engineering, vol. 121, pp. 5–33.
- Hemeda, A.A., Esteves, R.J.A., McLeskey, J.T., Gad-el-Hak, M., Khraisheh, M., and Vahedi Tafreshi, H. (2018) "Molecular Dynamic Simulations of Fibrous Distillation Membranes," International Communications in Heat and Mass Transfer, vol. 98, pp. 304–309.
- Ullah, R., Khraisheh, M., Esteves, R.J., McLeskey, J.T., AlGhouti, M., Gad-el-Hak, M., and Vahedi, Tafreshi, H. (2018) "Energy Efficiency of Direct Contact Membrane Distillation," Desalination, vol. 433, pp. 56–67.
- Zhu, Y., Lee, C., Chen, X., Wu, J., Chen, S., and Gad-el-Hak, M. (2018) "Newly Identified Principle for Aerodynamic Heating in Hypersonic Flows," Journal of Fluid Mechanics, vol. 855, pp. 152–180.
- Gad-el-Hak, M. (2019) "Coherent Structures and Flow Control: Genesis and Prospect," Bulletin of the Polish Academy of Sciences, vol. 67, pp. 411–444.
