= Youssef Marzouk =

American engineer and computational scientist

Youssef M. Marzouk is an American computational scientist who is the Breene M. Kerr (1951) Professor in the Department of Aeronautics and Astronautics at the Massachusetts Institute of Technology and an associate dean of the MIT Schwarzman College of Computing. His research focuses on uncertainty quantification, Bayesian computation, inverse problems, data assimilation, and machine learning for complex physical systems.

== Early life and education ==
Marzouk was born and raised in suburban St. Louis, Missouri. His parents emigrated from Egypt to the United States in the 1970s, and the family settled in St. Louis. He earned his S.B. in 1997, S.M. in 1999, and Ph.D. in 2004 from MIT. His doctoral work in mechanical engineering examined the structure and evolution of a transverse jet; in 2004, he received the Hertz Foundation Doctoral Thesis Prize for that research.

== Career and research ==
After completing his doctorate, Marzouk worked at Sandia National Laboratories as a Truman Fellow and member of the technical staff before joining the MIT faculty in 2009. He later became director of MIT's Aerospace Computational Design Laboratory and a core member of MIT's Statistics and Data Science Center.

Marzouk's research lies at the intersection of computational mathematics, statistical inference, and physical modeling. He develops methods for uncertainty quantification, Bayesian modeling and computation, experimental design, and machine learning, with applications in areas including environmental modeling, weather forecasting, and aerospace systems. His work has also included rare-event simulation and reliability analysis for aerospace systems.

In 2018, Marzouk became co-director of MIT's Center for Computational Science and Engineering. In 2025, he was appointed associate dean of the MIT Schwarzman College of Computing.

== Honors and recognition ==
Marzouk received the United States Department of Energy Early Career Research Award in 2010 and the MIT Junior Bose Award for Teaching Excellence in 2012. He was selected for the National Academy of Engineering's Frontiers of Engineering program in 2012 and was named an associate fellow of the American Institute of Aeronautics and Astronautics in 2018. In 2025, he was elected a SIAM Fellow for contributions to uncertainty quantification, Bayesian computation, and measure transport.
