= Tarek Omar Souryal =

American orthopedic surgeon

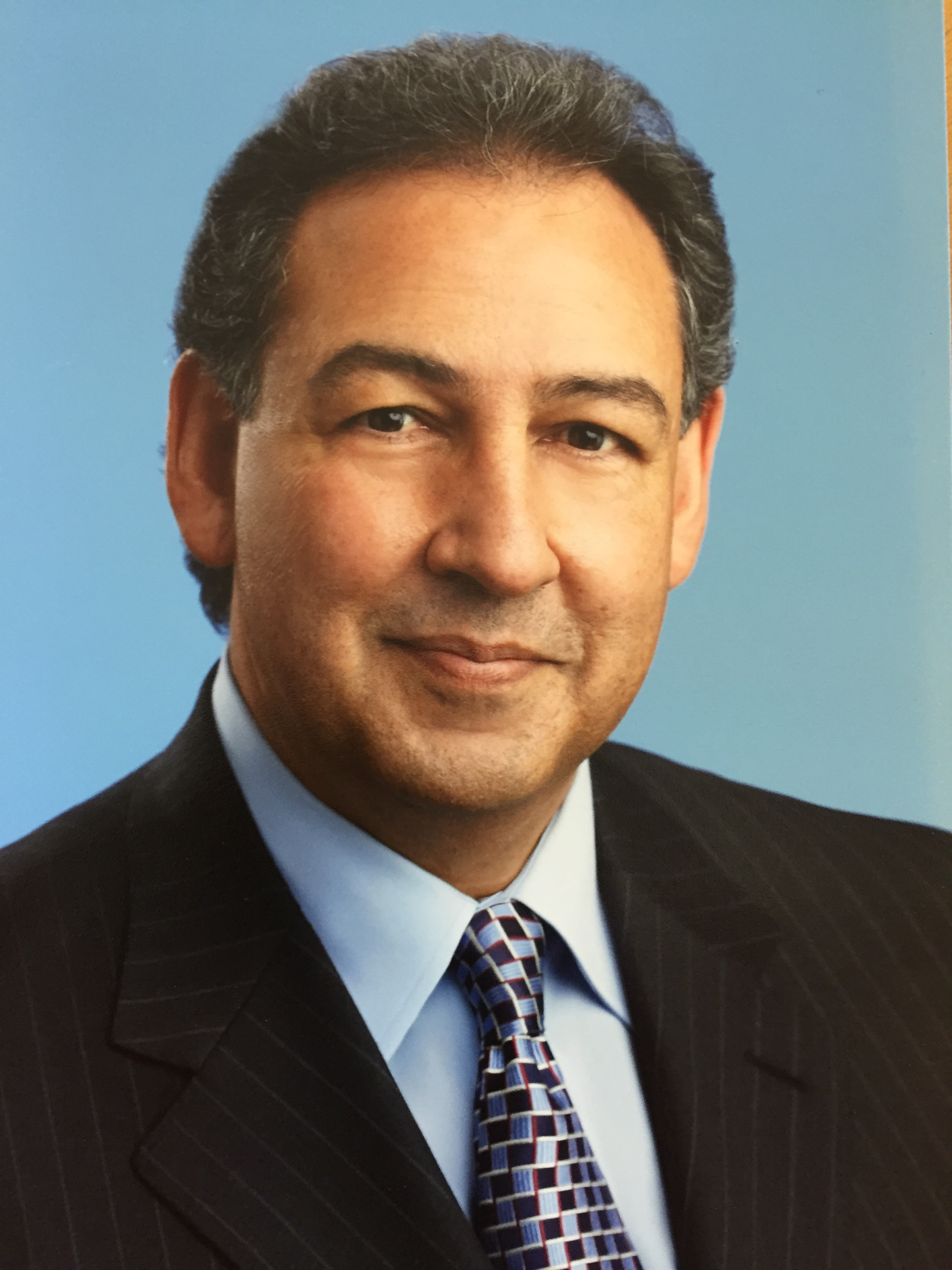
Dr. Tarek Omar "T.O." Souryal

Tarek Omar Souryal, MD (/sͻ:ri:æl/ SORR-ee-al) is an Egyptian-American orthopedic surgeon in the field of sports medicine, known for his research on the anterior cruciate ligament (ACL). He currently practices in Dallas, Texas, at Texas Sports Medicine and Orthopaedic Group. He was previously the Head Physician for the 2011 NBA Champion Dallas Mavericks professional basketball team and also served as the President of the NBA Physicians Association. He hosted a weekly radio show Inside Sports Medicine heard in the Dallas area. Souryal also provides medical advice and support to underprivileged high school athletes through his Texas Sports Medicine Foundation.

== Early life and education ==
Souryal was born January 10, 1957, in Cairo, Egypt. His family immigrated to the United States when he was 9 and settled in Huntsville, Texas. He graduated from Huntsville High School in 1974 and received a Bachelor of Science degree in Biology from Sam Houston State University in 1977. He attended medical school at the University of Texas Health Science Center at San Antonio and completed his internship and residency at the University of Texas Southwestern Medical School and Parkland Hospital in Dallas, respectively, followed by a sports medicine fellowship at the Hughston Orthopaedic Clinic in Columbus, Georgia. During this fellowship he published "Bilaterality in Anterior Cruciate Ligament Injuries" in the American Journal of Sports Medicine. In the paper, he reported discovering a particular boney structure in the knee that predisposes athletes to ACL tears. His research has been cited by numerous physicians writing for various academic publications.

== Medical career ==
After completing his fellowship in 1988, Souryal founded Texas Sports Medicine and Orthopaedic Group, where he is Medical Director. He began his career with the Dallas Mavericks in the late 1980s under then-owner Don Carter. Souryal was the Dallas Mavericks team doctor for 22 years and was a two-time President of the NBA Physicians Association. In addition to his work with the NBA and the Mavericks, Souryal was head physician for FC Dallas, CHL’s Dallas Freeze, and AFL’s Dallas Texans. Additionally, he oversaw a Student Sports Injury Clinic at Southern Methodist University from 1988 to 2002 and served as volunteer physician for several Dallas area high schools.

Souryal has authored several articles on sports injuries and their treatment, with subjects ranging from shoulder arthroscopy and reconstruction to ACL tears and rehabilitation.

== Texas Sports Medicine Foundation ==
Souryal founded the Texas Sports Medicine Foundation in 2003 to serve economically disadvantaged high school athletes with sports injuries and to support research studies on improving the setting in which student-athletes train and compete. The foundation lobbied the Texas Legislature to pass a bill requiring Texas public schools to have an automated external defibrillator on hand at all high school sporting events and practices, known in Texas as Senate Bill 7, signed into law in 2007.

== Inside Sports Medicine ==
Souryal hosted Inside Sports Medicine in the Dallas-Fort Worth radio market beginning in 2001. At the conclusion of the show's run in 2022, it aired for an hour on Saturday mornings on 96.7/1310 The Ticket. The show originally aired on 103.3 FM ESPN for two hours and for a period of time, on Sunday instead of Saturday mornings.
