= Laila Shereen Sakr =

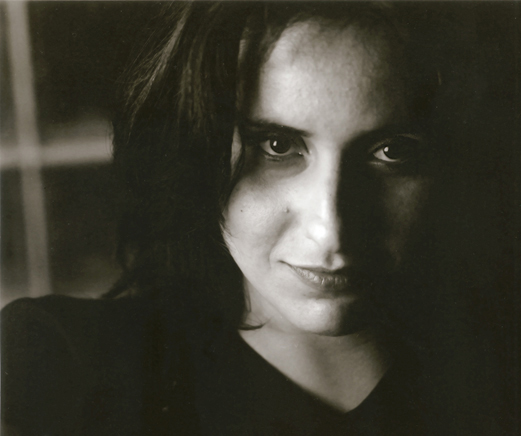
- Born: November 18, 1971 (age 54); Alexandria, Egypt
- Education: PhD in Media Arts and Practice from University of Southern California, M.F.A. in Digital Arts and New Media from University of California, Santa Cruz, and M.A. in Arab Studies from Georgetown University
- Occupations: artist, theorist, and lecturer
- Known for: Creating the award-winning media system, R-Shief (Arabic for 'archive'), and for predicting the fall of Muammar Gaddafi in Libya in August 2011 using Twitter analytics.
- Website: http://vjumamel.com

Laila Shereen Sakr (born 1971), known by her moniker, VJ Um Amel, is an Egyptian-American digital media theorist and artist. She is the founder of the digital lab, R-Shief, Inc., an Annenberg Fellow, and Assistant Professor of Media Theory & Practice at University of California, Santa Barbara, where she founded the Wireframe digital media studio.

She holds an M.F.A. in Digital Arts and New Media from University of California, Santa Cruz, an M.A. in Arab Studies from Georgetown University., and a PhD in Media Arts + Practice from the University of Southern California's School of Cinematic Arts.

== Work ==
With a background in documentary film and web development, her current practices include system design, cultural analytics, computational art, video art, and immersive cinema. She is known for building R-Shief, "one of the largest repositories of Arabic-language tweets" and for her predictive analytics of the fall of Qaddafi in Libya in August 2011. This work emerged from her doctoral research and development. For the practical component of her doctoral dissertation, VJ Um Amel archived rare social media collections from the Arab uprising and Occupy movements from 2010–2014. She collaborated with a team of engineers to innovate trending, semantic, sentiment tools that analyze Arabic and seven other languages using machine learning. From the analytics processed from the archives, she created 3D games, documentary video, video remixes, computational drawings, data visualizations, and digital performances.

Her media work has been shown in solo and group exhibitions and performances at galleries and museums including the San Francisco MoMA, National Gallery of Art in Jordan, Camera Austria, Cultura Digital in Brazil, Kirchner Cultural Centre in Argentina, Tahrir Cultural Center in Cairo, Fridge Art Gallery in Washington, DC, and 100 Copies in Egypt, among other venues. At UCSB, she co-founded Wireframe, a new digital media studio that supports critical game design and digital arts practice.

She is Co-Editor for the open access journal: Media Theory, and also for After Video published by Open Humanities Press. She collaborates with MIT’s Global Media Technologies & Cultures Lab as a Researcher. At UCSB, she is Faculty Affiliate in the Feminist Studies Department and the Center for Responsible Machine Learning, and serves on the advisory, executive, and steering committees for UCSB Digital Arts & Humanities Commons, Center for Middle East Studies, and Center for Information Technology & Society. Her current book project theorizes “glitch” as an experience of revolution and counterrevolution that occurred across the Arab world and reveals the indispensability, the promises, and the limits of digital communication across borders and languages.

Her journal articles appear in Middle East Critique, JCMS Teaching Dossier, Networking Knowledge: Journal of the Media, Communication, and Cultural Studies, Parson’s Journal for Information Mapping, Thoughtmesh: Critical Code Journal, and Feminist Debates in Digital Humanities.

== Life ==
She was born in Alexandria, Egypt to Egyptian parents.

== Awards ==
- Arab Council on Social Sciences (ACSS) research grant award to participate in working group on "Producing the Public: Space, Media, Participation," (2013–2015)
- Awarded Future Leadership Award by Egyptian American Association (November 2012)
- HASTAC Scholar nomination and award (2010–2011)
- Annenberg Graduate Fellowship (2010–2014)

== Publications ==
- "A Digital Humanities Approach: Text, the Internet, and the Egyptian Uprising" – Middle East Critique.
- "The Materiality of Virtuality" in Mediating the Arab Uprisings, Eds. Iskander and Haddad.
- "Studying Social Streams: Cultural Analytics in Arabic"
- "Egypt's Presidential Election and Twitter Talk"
- "The Materiality of Virtuality: Internet Reporting On Arab Revolutions"
- "Collateral Damage: #Oslo Attacks and Proliferating Islamophobia"
- "The R-Shief Initiative: Proof of Concept"
- On Becoming Arab," "Give," "Human Skin"
- “Media-Making Madness: #Arab Revolutions from the Perspective of Egyptian-American”
- “From Archive to Analytics: Building Counter-Collections of Arabic Social Media”
- “On Developing a Teaching Module on Arab Social Media”
- "Ev-Ent-Anglement: Reflexively Extending Engagement By Way of Technology"
- "Security or Uncertainty: Stabilizing R-Shief Twitter Analysis during the Jasmine & Egyptian Revolutions"
- "The Virtual Body Politic: A Networked Political Mobilization of Information Patterns and Materiality"
- "Techies on the Ground: Revisiting Egypt 2011"

== Reviews ==
- "In Cairo, Artists Use Pixels, Cyborgs, and More to Examine Technology and Belief"
- "The Sound of a Glitch"
- "AUC’s TCC Hosts Three Exhibitions on Art and Technology"
- "“#Intersection” Hashtag"
- "Data Bodies and Tech Activism with VJ Um Amel"
- "Understanding Social Movements through Social Media’s Big Data"
- "A billion tweets turned into virtual reality"
- "What’s Trending in Social Media on the Middle East?"
- "Fast Forward: The Future(s) of the Cinematic Arts"
- "Scholars Re-Examine Arab World’s ‘Facebook Revolutions'"
- "R-Shief's 5th Anniversary"
- "The Middle East finds its voice on social media"
- "New Texts Out Now: VJ Um Amel, A Digital Humanities Approach: Text, the Internet, and the Egyptian Uprising"
- "A year in review: When history becomes art"
- "'The People's Skype' and Occupy Wall Street Hackathons"
- "From the Manhattan Project to the Cloud: Arms Control in the Information Age"
- "Social Scientists Wade into the Tweet Stream"
- "VJ Um Amel hits 'the social' in media"
- "Digital Learning and the Arab Spring"
- "Interview with VJ Um Amel"
- "Twitter's Window on Middle East Uprisings"
- "VJ Um Amel Remixes a Revolution"
- "Not Your Mother's VJ"
