= Nancy Youssef =

American journalist

- Born: Washington, DC
- Education: University of Virginia (BA); Johns Hopkins University (MA); Georgetown University (MA)
- Occupations: Journalist, chief correspondent
- Employer(s): The Wall Street Journal (2021–2025); The Atlantic (2025–present)
- Known for: War correspondence in Iraq and Afghanistan

Nancy A. Youssef is an American journalist known for her reporting on national security, with a focus on U.S. military operations and the Middle East. Until 2025, she was a national security correspondent for The Wall Street Journal, where she covered military affairs and the Arab world. Youssef has earned significant recognition for her coverage of conflicts in Iraq, Afghanistan, and the broader Arab world, and she has worked for several leading news outlets, including The Daily Beast, BuzzFeed News, and McClatchy Newspapers.

== Early life and education ==
Born to Egyptian parents, Nancy Youssef is a first-generation American, raised in Washington, D.C. She is fluent in Arabic and has reported extensively from the Middle East. Youssef graduated with a Bachelor’s degree in Economics from the University of Virginia. She later pursued postgraduate studies at the Johns Hopkins University's School of Advanced International Studies. Youssef holds a Master’s degree in Security studies from Georgetown University’s Walsh School of Foreign Service, further deepening her expertise in global security and international relations.

== Journalism career ==
Youssef began her journalism career at The Baltimore Sun, before moving to the Detroit Free Press, where she covered legal issues and international conflict. Her pivotal reporting on the Iraq War for Knight Ridder involved traveling across Jordan and Iraq, providing extensive on-the-ground coverage from the conflict's outset through the post-war period.

In 2005, Youssef joined McClatchy Newspapers as part of the Washington Bureau, where she would go on to serve as the chief of the Baghdad Bureau during the Iraq War. Her reporting focused on the impact of U.S. military strategy on the Iraqi people, addressing issues like civilian casualties and the broader social and political dynamics of Iraq.

Youssef’s role at McClatchy also included serving as chief Pentagon correspondent, covering U.S. military operations in both Iraq and Afghanistan. She was also president of the Pentagon Press Association. Additionally, Youssef worked as Middle East bureau chief at McClatchy and reported on significant events, including the 2011 Egyptian Revolution.

In 2014, Youssef transitioned to The Daily Beast as senior defense and national security correspondent, later moving to BuzzFeed News in 2017, continuing her coverage of military affairs and global security. From 2021 to 2025, Youssef has been a national security correspondent for The Wall Street Journal, where she focuses on military operations and defense policy. On June 18, 2025, Youssef was hired by The Atlantic as a staff writer, effective July 7, 2025.

Throughout her career, Youssef’s work has earned her several accolades, including the John S. Knight Fellowship for Professional Journalists (2007–2008), the Alfred I. duPont-Columbia University Award for excellence in journalism (2010), and recognition from the University of Virginia and the Maryland-D.C. Delaware Press Association.

== The Chatter Podcast ==
Youssef’s conversation with Shane Harris on the Lawfare Podcast highlights the risks faced by journalists working in conflict zones. She discussed the case of Evan Gershkovich, a colleague arrested in Russia on charges of espionage that have been denied by his family, employer, and the U.S. government. As someone who has seen fellow journalists taken prisoner amid conflict, Youssef shared her thoughts on the dangers journalists face, in war zones and from governments that see information as a weapon. Her work also includes covering the disappearance of Austin Tice, a journalist and friend of Youssef's, who went missing in Syria in 2012. Youssef’s advocacy underscores the risks that journalists face while reporting from volatile regions.
