= Rachel Wahba =

Jewish-American Mizrahi writer (born 1946)

- Born: March 19, 1946 (age 80); Bombay, Bombay Presidency, British India
- Occupations: Writer, activist, psychotherapist
- Website: rachelwahba.com

Rachel Wahba (born March 19, 1946) is an American writer of Mizrahi and Sephardic Jewish topics and a psychotherapist in private practice in San Francisco and in Marin County. She has written extensively about her mother's traumatic experience during the Farhud, the pogrom carried out against the Jewish population of Baghdad in June 1941.

== Early years ==
Rachel Wahba was born in Bombay in 1946, during the late stage of British rule over India. Her father, Maurice (Moussa) Wahba, was born in Mansoura, Egypt to a Jewish family, and lived in Cairo, Egypt until he left in 1939 to Baghdad, where he met Rachel's mother-to-be, an Iraqi Jew. Her maternal grandmother, Massouda (Meeda), was an Iraqi Jew from Singapore.

After the Farhud, her family moved to British India, where Rachel was born. However, after the independence of India in 1948, her father decided they moved to Japan to take over his brother's business. Wahba, her mother and her younger brother arrived in 1950, with assistance of the Red Cross as they were stateless persons.

The family waited 20 years to immigrate to the United States. Upon arriving in the U.S., Wahba was thrilled to find her brown skin color (unappreciated in Japan as curombo ("darky") a plus in Los Angeles. "Where did you get your tan?" replaced hostile taunts in postwar Japan. However it was a revelation to Wahba, who grew up in a multicultural community with a synagogue composed of Jews from all over the world, to realize that most American Jews at that time in the 1970s did not understand that a modern Jew could be of West Asian/North African heritage, as everything Jewish for them was defined by the Ashkenazi North American experience, and the Eastern Jew did not exist except in the Torah.

Wahba remains an activist, teaching that Jews are a multicultural people, that Yiddish was only one of many Jewish languages and dialects, including Judeo-Arabic and Ladino, and Jewish cuisine is equally international.

Wahba serves on the advisory board of the advocacy group JIMENA (Jews Indigenous to the Middle East and North Africa).

== Works ==
She has published several anthologies relating to being a Mizrahi/Sephardi Jew of Egyptian and Iraqi-born parents and the indignities suffered by Jews who were forced into second-class (dhimmi) status in their homelands, as well as cultural dominance of the Ashkenazi Jews in countries like the United States, where it was difficult for her as she did not share their language, history or food, making it hard for her to identify with American Jews, which are overwhelmingly of Eastern European origin.

She has also published essays in psychoanalytic approaches to work with women and lesbians.

== Personal life ==
Rachel Wahba is also co-founder and co-owner (with her former wife, Judy Dlugacz), of Olivia Travel, a lesbian travel and resort company.

Rachel currently lives in Marin County, California, United States with her granddaughter, Rebecca.

Wahba identifies as an Arab Jew.

== Bibliography ==
- Nice Jewish Girls
- Twice Blessed
- The Flying Camel
- Coming Out of the Frame in Lesbians in Psychoanalysis
- A Twinship Disruption in Progress in Psychoanalytic Self Psychology
