= Meena Dimian =

Egyptian-American broadcaster, writer and actor

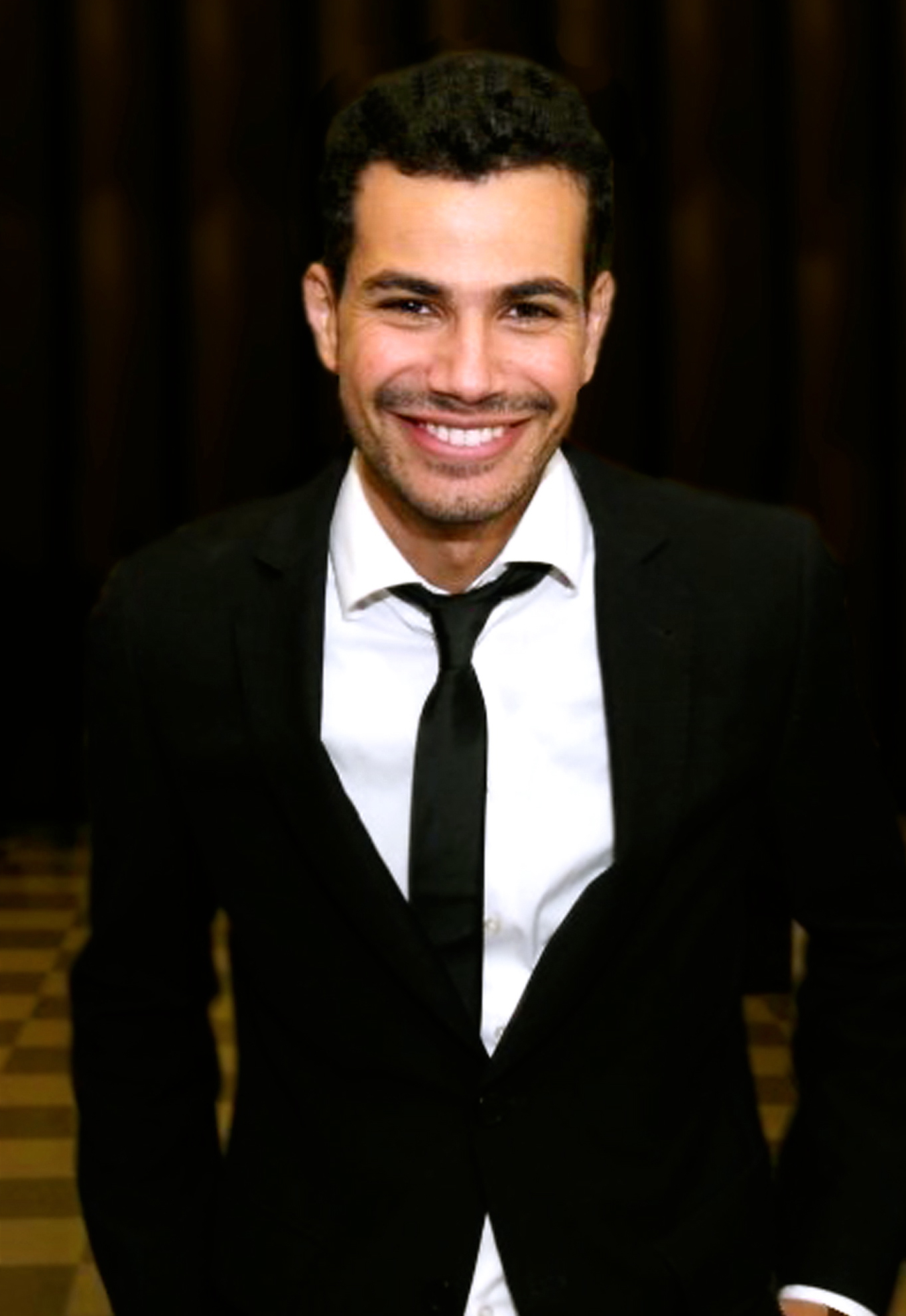
- Born: December 29, 1981 (age 44)

Comedy career
- Years active: 2006–present
- Medium: Television, Stand-up, Film, Radio, Theater
- Subjects: Political humour, Current events, Society, Egyptian culture,
- Website: www.meenaonline.com

Meena Sameh Dimian (born December 29, 1981) is an American broadcaster, writer, actor and international television personality of Egyptian descent. He is most widely known as a host on the #1 panel talk show in the Middle East; "Zahret El Khalieg [زهرة الخليج]" on Abu Dhabi TV (Abu Dhabi al Oula). In addition, Meena was featured on an ABC News segment for their primetime news serial What Would You Do? where he played a Muslim store clerk dealing with racism. The video subsequently went viral and received over 50 million views. He has been featured on ABC, Comedy Central, CNN, TLC, and BBC.

== Early life ==
Meena was born in Bayonne, New Jersey. His parents had immigrated from Egypt one year before. Soon after his birth, his mother Mariam opened a dental practice in Staten Island, New York, where he would eventually grow up. His father, Sameh Youssef Dimian was a published writer and poet as well as an acclaimed community theater actor, writer, and director. Meena grew up watching Egyptian film, theater, and television in tandem with his American mainstream media obsession.

== Career ==
=== Stand-Up ===
Meena was a young fan of Johnny Carson's in the late 1980s. This spawned his obsession with comedians and the art of stand-up comedy. While studying philosophy at Rutgers University, he started writing comedy in hopes of someday becoming a comedian on New York's stand-up scene. Within 3 years, he had won a spot on NBC's Stand-Up for Diversity Showcase, performed at every major club in town and played sold-out shows at venues as large as the Town Hall in New York City.

=== Television and acting ===
Dimian's first break in television came when he was hired as co-host on NYC-TV's news brief, "CityScoop". The show, which covered city, regional, and national news, would garner 4 NY Emmy nominations during his time there. In late 2008, he was offered a panel host position on Abu Dhabi-1's flagship talk show Zahret Al Khalieg, [زهرة الخليج] an analog of ABC's The View. Zahret Al Khalieg continues to be a top-rated program in the region. With his notoriety rising in the Middle East, Meena was asked to host and headline the Amman Comedy Festival in Jordan in both 2008 and 2010. In 2014 Meena was cast as a Muslim store clerk for a segment of ABC's What Would You Do? which went viral.

== Personal life ==
Dimian lives in Los Angeles. He's married to Monrok.
