= Oprah's Anti-war series =

Series of episodes of The Oprah Winfrey Show

Oprah’s Anti-war series was a series of episodes of The Oprah Winfrey Show that ran from early November 2002 until March 18, 2003. The series was supposed to begin in the fall of 2001 but was delayed when the pilot episode inspired an enormous backlash. Winfrey was quoted as saying:

I once did a show titled Is War the Only Answer? In the history of my career, I've never received more hate mail — like 'Go back to Africa' hate mail. I was accused of being un-American for even raising the question."

In a September 2002 interview with Phil Donahue, Winfrey asked for advice on how one could do such shows without looking unpatriotic: “After we did a show called ‘Is War the Only Answer?’ I thought, Can’t you even ask the question without people attacking you”. Donahue replied by saying that dissent would become easier as time passed from September 11.

Winfrey praised Donahue for plans to do anti-war shows on MSNBC, saying, “the bottom line is we need you, Phil, because we need to be challenged by the voice of dissent”, but was not yet ready to rejoin the anti-war movement herself. In the subsequent months, her position on joining the movement changed.

Professor Daphne Read noted that in the aftermath of the attacks on the World Trade Center, The Oprah Winfrey Show, like all mainstream media, "was very closely tied to the Bush administration's response and the media rhetoric of America Under Attack, ...however, the content of Winfrey's forum began to diverge from the purely consensual, giving voice to a much wider range of views.”

== Episodes ==
=== Help You Decide if You Think We Should Attack Iraq ===
On October 9 2002, Oprah did a show called "Help You Decide if You Think We should attack Iraq", in which she gave more time and weight to those who supported the war, and cut off an audience member who questioned if WMDs existed in Iraq. According to celebrity biographer Kitty Kelly, Oprah said weapons were "just a fact."

An anti-war website published an activist's letter objecting to Oprah's presentation: "That show was the biggest abuse of power that I have seen on television in a long time. ... A talk show host and idol to many, you usually present an open exchange of opinions. How could you allow such an unbalanced show like that to air, when the future of the entire Planet is at stake?!"

=== What Does The World Think Of Us? ===
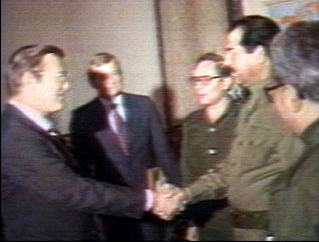
As President Reagan's Special Envoy to the Middle East, Rumsfeld met with Saddam Hussein during a visit to Baghdad in December 1983, during the Iran–Iraq War (see video here).

In early November 2002, Winfrey aired a show called “What Does The World Think Of Us?” The show challenged Americans to be skeptical about their government's foreign policy. For this, Winfrey was praised by anti-war activist Michael Moore for being the only mainstream media figure at the time to show footage of Donald Rumsfeld shaking Saddam Hussein's hand in the 1980s. Moore wrote:

When she showed Rumsfeld all lovey with Saddam, there was an audible gasp in the studio audience. Everyday, average Americans were shocked to see that the devil was actually our devil. Thank you, Oprah.”

Moore argued that the footage was especially important for Americans to see because the rest of the mainstream media was only showing much older footage of Jacques Chirac shaking Saddam Hussein's hand in the 1970s, seemingly to imply France opposed a war with Iraq because they were friendly with Hussein.

=== The World Speaks Out On Iraq ===
“The World Speaks Out On Iraq” was considered to be the most significant installment of Winfrey’s anti-war series, for being a two-day special aired on February 6, 2003, the day after Colin Powell's speech to the United Nations which was credited with shifting public opinion in favor of the war.

Winfrey told her audience that it was the most important time to speak out against the war, and that she wanted to hear not just from her studio audience but from people around the world. She showed clips from citizens of Britain, France, South Africa, Iraq, and Pakistan, all urging America not to go to war. She also showed clips of Nelson Mandela and Pope John Paul II speaking out against war, and interviewed a spokesman for Patriots for Peace. Also appearing on the show were anti-war activist Jessica Mathews and columnist Thomas Friedman, who debated whether America should go to war. Mathews pointed out that Saddam Hussein had no connections to al-Qaeda. While Friedman supported war only if America could get international support, he conceded that Hussein was not a security threat to America. At the end of the two-day show, Winfrey sided with Mathews, agreeing that the case for war was not convincing enough, considering the consequences.

During part one of the show, a press conference held by George W. Bush and Colin Powell interrupted the show in many markets. An article in Buzzflash.com claimed the press conference was a deliberate attempt to silence debate:

Bush pre-empted Oprah for no reason other than to stop her broadcast regarding Iraq and insert his own propaganda!…In the middle of the show a "Special News Report" notice came up, then Peter Jennings announced Bush would be making a MAJOR announcement on Iraq. Then Bush and Powell came in and Bush summarized what Powell had said yesterday at the UN. He spent about 20 minutes in all…The Administration would have known the content and timing of today’s show because it is broadcast live and/or in the morning in many markets such as Oprah’s home base in Chicago. This was in such bad form I couldn't believe it! I called Harpo Studios in Chicago to let them know and they said they had received a lot of phone calls. I said Oprah should tell her audience what happened and that I thought Bush was purposely interfering with her show. They commented they didn't know what the reason was and in any case there was no way to prove anything.

An article from Academics for Justice drew the same conclusion:

Today, Oprah Winfrey started a two-part series focusing on the impending U.S. war on Iraq. About halfway through the show the broadcast was pre-empted by coverage of Pres. George Bush, with Colin Powell at his side, reading a prepared statement on Iraq. The coincidental timing of this pre-emptive press statement raised immediate questions about the motives of the White House war strategists. Students of the Civil Rights Movement will recall an incident in 1964 when activist Fannie Lou Hamer sat before a live television audience and gave a riveting account of the oppression she and other Blacks faced in the South. President Lyndon Johnson was so convinced of the power of her appeal to undermine his own political/racial agenda, that he hastily called a press conference to pull cameras away from Hamer’s impassioned revelations…The pre-emption of Winfrey’s show today should be seen in the same light. Oprah’s audience is a vast and powerful—but largely apolitical—force of middle-class white women. It is likely that most did not watch Colin Powell’s live testimony at the U.N. yesterday. In fact, it is likely that this huge audience was being oriented to the issues of the Iraq war for the first time…The first 30 minutes of the show was decidedly anti-war and highlighted not only worldwide unanimity in opposition to the war but presented many of the heretofore unheard voices of ordinary people speaking forcefully against Bush’s motives.

=== What You Should Know About Iraq ===
On March 6, 2003 Winfrey did a show called “What You Should Know About Iraq,” in which Middle East expert Fawaz Gerges described the suffering of the Iraqi people since Operation Desert Storm. Gerges argued that the desire of the Bush administration to overthrow Saddam Hussein would have a devastating effect on the Iraqi people. Dan Rather also talked about his interview with Hussein, in which Hussein was apparently curious about George W. Bush and the will of the American people to attack Iraq. The guests on the show explained that the United States had worked with several dictators in the past and actively aided Hussein during the administration of Ronald Reagan to keep the Islamic fundamentalist movement in Iran from spreading. On Oprah After The Show (aired on Winfrey's cable network Oxygen (now owned by NBC Universal)), Gerges urged Winfrey's audience not to believe reports linking Saddam Hussein to the September 11th attacks, reports which Winfrey condemned as "propaganda."

=== Anti-Americanism – Why Do So Many Dislike the U.S.? ===
“Anti-Americanism - Why Do So Many Dislike the U.S.?” was the final installment in Winfrey's anti-war series. It aired on March 18, in the immediate aftermath of Bush’s 48-hour speech and just two days before the war began. The show explored whether, if America won a war with Iraq, it might lose something bigger.

The show was strongly condemned by proponents of the war like Townhall.com’s Ben Shapiro, who criticized Winfrey for showing bias during the show and featuring only anti-Bush, anti-war guests including Fawaz Gerges and Thomas Friedman. Shapiro said:

Oprah also showed part of Michael Moore's "Bowling for Columbine," which lambastes American foreign policy. "It resonated with a lot of people, me included," she sweetly informed. When Friedman (remember, he's supposed to provide balance) stated that "the Bush administration is going to have to have an attitude lobotomy," Oprah laughed out loud. After showing a clip of young Muslim man ripping America, Oprah noted: "What he said sounded like what I've heard from people of color all over the world."

Steve Perry of Minneapolis/St. Paul City Pages praised the show, writing:

The mood of the broadcast was quietly and vehemently antiwar. The most amazing segment came midway through, when Oprah lent her seal of approval to a lengthy and fairly devastating bit of Michael Moore's Bowling For Columbine--the scene in which shot after shot and caption after caption recount bloody U.S.-sponsored coups and dictators while Louis Armstrong croons "What a Wonderful World." Now first, you rarely see this sort of thing on American television, and when you do it is always followed by a litany of credentialed hacks telling you what hogwash it is. But after the clip, and Moore's own pointed comments about our bloody empire, no one tried to deny the veracity of the claims.

Also praising the show for its "amazing perspective" was The Globe and Mail's television critic John Doyle, who noted that "at a time when the consensus in American television is that everybody should pull together and support the men and women in the U.S. military, what Oprah Winfrey did was outright subversion."

Gerges told Winfrey’s audience that although war was very imminent, he felt a responsibility to express his dissent right up to the last minute.

A few months after the show aired, anti-war activist Michael Moore publicly begged Winfrey to run for president.
