= Waguih Ishak =

Egyptian–American engineer

Waguih S. Ishak FREng
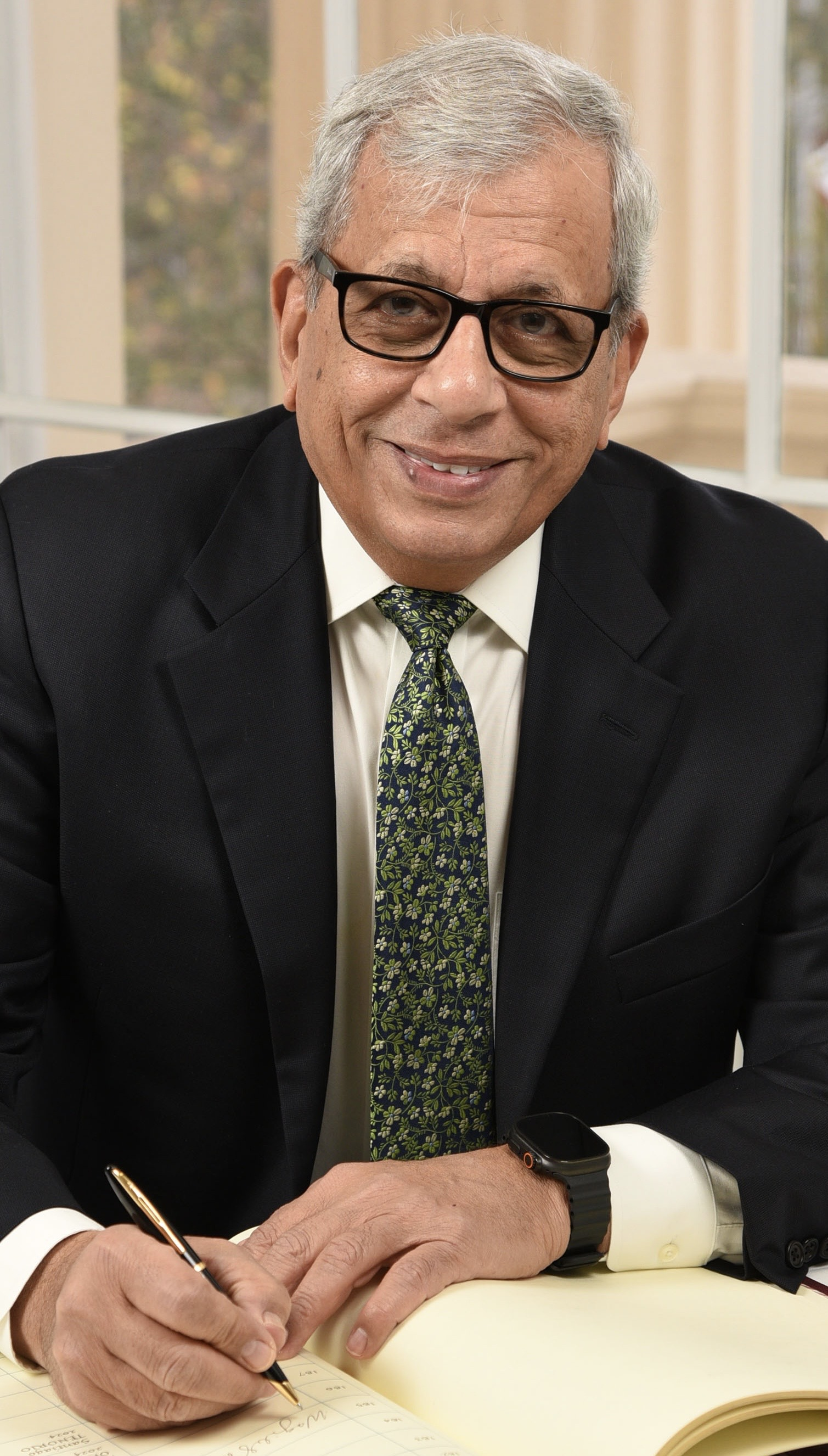
- Born: Egypt
- Known for: Photonics, Optical interconnects, Semiconductor devices
- Awards: IEEE Photonics Society Industry Achievement Award (2024); Fellow, Royal Academy of Engineering (2024); Fellow of the Royal Society of Canada (Academy of Science) (2024); Member, National Academy of Engineering (2022); Fellow, Canadian Academy of Engineering (2020); Life Fellow of IEEE (2015)

Academic background
- Education: Cairo University; Ain Shams University; McMaster University; Stanford Graduate School of Business

Academic work
- Institutions: Corning Inc. Stanford University; Avago Technologies; Agilent Technologies; Hewlett-Packard

Waguih S. Ishak FREng, is an Egyptian-American-Canadian engineer, technologist, and academic. He is the former Division Vice President and Chief Technologist at Corning Inc. and a retired adjunct professor of electrical engineering at Stanford University.

== Education ==
Ishak earned a B.Sc. (Honors) in Electrical Engineering from Cairo University in 1971 and a B.Sc. (Honors) in Mathematics from Ain Shams University in 1973. He completed his M.Sc. (1975) and Ph.D. (1978) in Electrical Engineering at McMaster University, Canada. He later attended the Stanford Executive Program in 1999.

== Career ==
In 2007, Ishak joined Corning Inc. to establish the Corning West Technology Center (CWTC) in Palo Alto, California, leading advanced research in optical interconnects, novel displays, and semiconductor devices. He was named Division Vice President and Chief Technologist in 2016, and later retired from Corning.

Previously, he was CTO and Vice President at Avago Technologies (now Broadcom) from 2005 to 2007, where he founded and led a U.S. R&D center focused on high-speed semiconductors, photonics, and III-V compound devices. From 2003 to 2005, Ishak directed the Photonics & Electronics Research Lab at Agilent Technologies.

From 1987 to 2003, he led the Communications & Optics Research Laboratory at Hewlett Packard Labs, working on photonics and integrated electronics. Earlier, from 1978 to 1987, he contributed to bubble memories and acoustic technologies at HP Labs.

=== Academic career ===
Ishak has served on technical advisory boards for USC, University of California, San Diego, Santa Clara University, University of California, Santa Barbara, and McMaster University.

From 2018 to his retirement, Ishak was adjunct professor in Stanford’s Department of Electrical Engineering.

== Awards and recognition ==
- IEEE Photonics Society Industry Achievement Award (2024)
- Elected member of the U.S. National Academy of Engineering (2022)
- Fellow of the Royal Academy of Engineering (2024)
- Fellow of the Royal Society of Canada (Academy of Science) (2024)
- Fellow, Canadian Academy of Engineering (2020)
- Life Fellow of IEEE (2015)
- Honorary Doctor of Science, McMaster University (2018)
