= Ragui Assaad =

Egyptian economist

Ragui A. Assaad is an Egyptian-American economist and Professor of Planning and Public Affairs at the Humphrey School of Public Affairs (University of Minnesota). His research interests include labour economics, inequality and the economics of education. He ranks among the most prominent economists of Egypt.

== Biography ==
Ragui Assaad earned a B.Sc. in physics as well as a M.Sc. in mechanical engineering from Stanford University in 1981. Thereafter, he first worked as a project manager in the solid waste management department of Environmental Quality International in Cairo (1982–84) before being tasked with the development of a labor market study on the construction sector at Egypt's statistical agency CAPMAS with financing from the Ford Foundation and IDRC. Based on this experience, he wrote a dissertation on structured labor markets at Cornell University for which he obtained a Ph.D. in City and Regional Planning in 1991. Since his graduation, Assaad has worked at the Hubert H. Humphrey School of Public Affairs of the University of Minnesota, first as an assistant professor (1990–97), then as an associate professor (1997-2003), and since 2003 as a full professor. Additionally, Ragui Assaad has been a research fellow of the Economic Research Forum (ERF) since 1994, where he has moreover been leading the ERF's research on labour markets, human development and demographics since 2011, at the Brookings Institution since 2010 and at the IZA Institute of Labor Economics since 2013. From 2005 to 2008, Assaad also served as regional director for West Asia and North Africa at the Population Council's regional office in Cairo. In terms of professional service, he has been - among else - a member of the editorial board of the Journal of Planning Education and Research (1997-2009), a member of the board of directors of the Middle East Economic Association, and a consultant for numerous international organisations, including the World Bank, ILO and UNDP.

== Research ==
Ragui Assaad's research focuses on the labour markets in the Arab World, education and human resource development, youth transitions to adulthood, and the inequality of opportunity. He has been the driving force behind labour market panel surveys in several MENA countries, including Egypt, Jordan and Tunisia. Key findings of his research include:

- In Egypt, the government's employment guarantee for graduates and the fact that public sector wages in the 1990s were at least as high as in the private sector have jointly encouraged queuing for government jobs, reduced the employment of graduates in the private sector, and thereby contributed to high youth unemployment rates and unsustainable growth of public sector employment.
- The differences between Egyptian men and women's access to wage employment has increased during the 1990s, in part because women have less geographic mobility and thus cannot pursue job opportunities to the same degree as men.
- Labour market relations in settings where formal institutions are absent or ineffective, e.g. in Egypt's construction market in the late 1980s, may still be shaped by informal institutions such as customs, kinship groups, or other social networks.
- Egyptian women in urban areas respond differently to their husbands working abroad than in rural areas: whereas in urban areas, female labour market participation decreases in response to male international migration, female work in rural areas simply shifts towards unpaid family and subsistence work.

== Selected publications ==
- Assaad, R., Krafft, C. (2015). The Egyptian Labor Market in an Era of Revolution. Oxford, UK: Oxford University Press.
- Assaad, R. (2014). The Jordanian Labor Market in the New Millennium. Oxford, UK: Oxford University Press.
- Amin, M. et al. (2012). After the Spring: Economic Transitions in the Arab World. Oxford, UK: Oxford University Press.
