= Mary Bishai =

American physicist

Mary R. M. Bishai
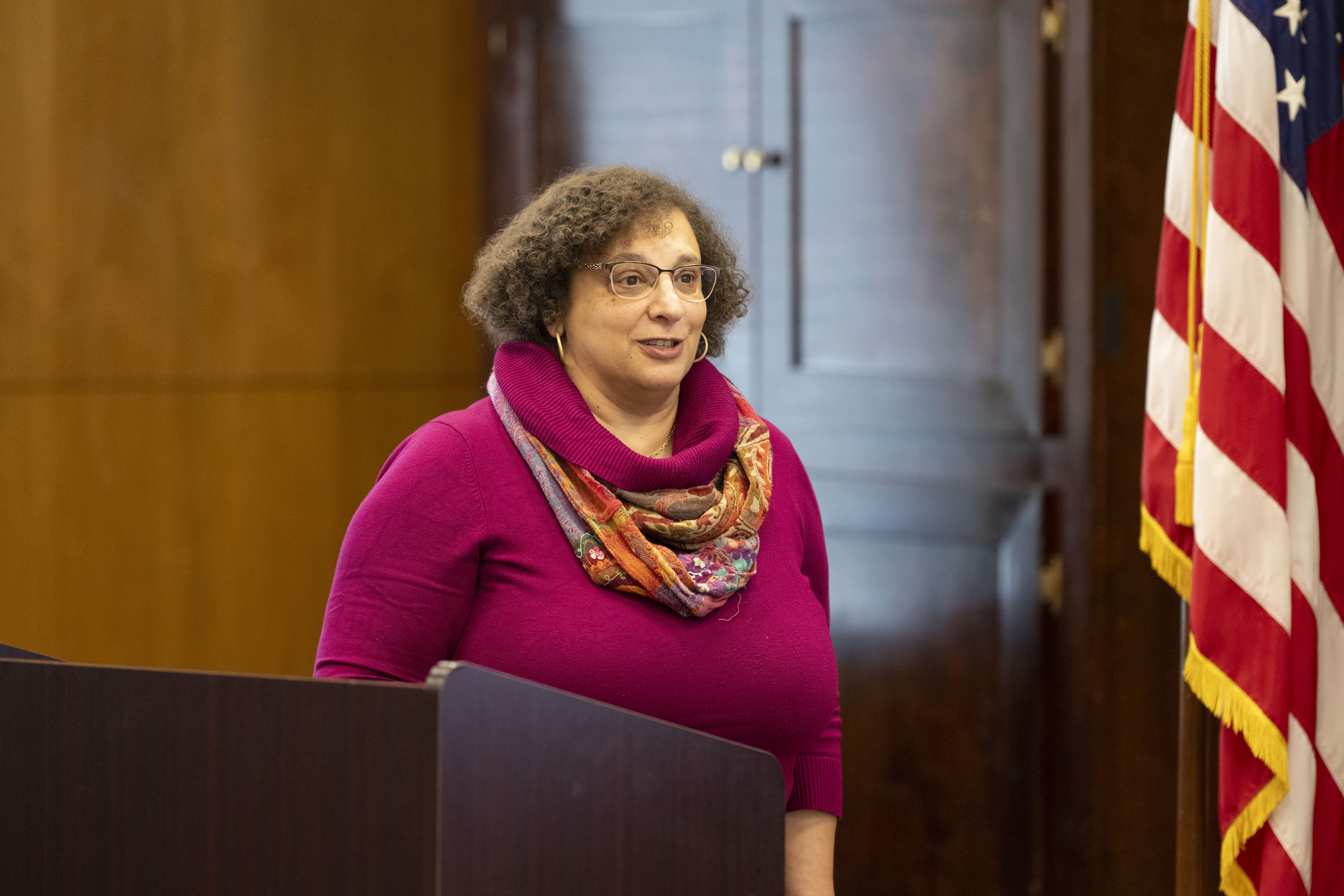
- Born: 1970 (age 55–56); Cairo, Egypt
- Education: University of Colorado Boulder (BA); Purdue University (MSc, PhD)
- Scientific career
- Workplaces: Brookhaven National Laboratory; Fermi National Accelerator Laboratory
- Thesis: A study of semileptonic and 2-body decays of charm strange baryons, a search for CP violation in Xi hyperon decays and a study of surface-treated planar microstrip gas chambers (1999)
- Doctoral advisor: Ian P.J. Shipesy
- Website: www.bnl.gov/staff/mbishai

Mary R. M. Bishai (born 1970) is an Egyptian-American physicist who is a Distinguished Scientist at Brookhaven National Laboratory. In 2023, she was elected co-spokesperson of Deep Underground Neutrino Experiment, and was made responsible for the 1,400 person collaboration. She was named a Fellow of the American Physical Society in 2014.

== Early life and education ==
Bishai was born to a family of engineers. Her father had a PhD in electrical engineering and her grandfather was a science teacher. She grew up in Nigeria and Egypt and is of Egyptian descent. In 1985, she read a National Geographic magazine about particle physics experiments taking place at CERN, and decided that was what she wanted to work on. She was an undergraduate student in physics at University of Colorado Boulder, then moved to Purdue University for graduate studies, where she worked on the CLEO experiment at Cornell University. She worked on parity violations in the decays of charm-strange baryons. She was awarded the Purdue University George W. Tautfest Award, an award that honors outstanding physics graduate students.

== Research and career ==
In 1998, Bishai joined Fermi National Accelerator Laboratory as a research associate, where she was involved with Tevatron. She worked on quantum chromodynamics.

Bishai joined Brookhaven National Laboratory in 2004. She was hired to work on the MINOS experiment, a long baseline neutrino project. Her recommendations enabled the CD-0 decision from the United States Department of Energy (DOE) that enabled the Long Baseline Neutrino Experiment. She was part of the team who measured the J/psi meson cross sections at the Collider Detector at Fermilab. Her role as Project Scientist for the LBNE from 2012 to 2015 contributed to the formation of the Deep Underground Neutrino Experiment (DUNE) in 2015.

Dr. Bishai also contributes as a mentor, committed to guiding young scientists in the field. This includes mentoring over 15 undergraduate students through the DOE-funded Science Undergraduate Laboratory Internship program and 5 high school student interns through the High School Research Program, both hosted by Brookhaven National Laboratory (BNL). Additionally, she has mentored students who visited Brookhaven as part of the African School of Physics program.

=== Selected publications ===
- F. P. An; J. Z. Bai; A. B. Balantekin; et al. (April 2012). "Observation of Electron-Antineutrino Disappearance at Daya Bay". Physical Review Letters. 108 (17) 171803. arXiv:1203.1669. doi:10.1103/physrevlett.108.171803. ISSN 0031-9007. PMID 22680853. Wikidata Q27448668.
- Phil Adamson; D J Auty; D S Ayres; et al. (27 October 2011). "Improved search for Muon-neutrino to electron-neutrino oscillations in MINOS". Physical Review Letters. 107 (18) 181802. arXiv:1108.0015. doi:10.1103/physrevlett.107.181802. ISSN 0031-9007. PMID 22107623. Wikidata Q58379444.
- M. S. Alam; I. J. Kim; Z. Ling; et al. (10 April 1995). "First measurement of the rate for the inclusive radiative penguin decay b-->s gamma". Physical Review Letters. 74 (15): 2885–2889. doi:10.1103/physrevlett.74.2885. ISSN 0031-9007. PMID 10058050. Wikidata Q27349109.

=== Awards and honors ===
In 2014, Bishai was elected a Fellow of the American Physical Society "for her contributions to flavour physics."

Bishai served as the co-spokesperson of Deep Underground Neutrino Experiment (DUNE) from January 2023 through March of 2025. As co-spokesperson, Bishai was responsible for leading the 1,400 member neutrino collaboration. DUNE will send the most intense neutrino beam in the world from Fermilab to the Sanford Underground Research Facility.
