= Esteve (name) =

Esteve is both a Catalan surname and a given name. Notable people with the name include:

- Agustín Esteve (1753–1830), Spanish painter
- Alicia Esteve Head (born 1973), Spanish hoaxer
- Antoni Esteve Subirana (1902–1979), Spanish pharmacist
- Esteve Rabat (born 1989), Spanish motorcycle racer
- Genís Boadella i Esteve (born 1979), Catalan politician
- Henri Esteve (born 1989), American actor
- Irineu Esteve Altimiras (born 1996), Andorran cross-country skier
- José Esteve Juan (1550–1603), Spanish Roman Catholic bishop
- Josep Esteve i Seguí (1873–1927), Spanish pharmacist and folklorist
- Josep Esteve i Soler (1930–2019), Spanish industrialist
- Kevin Esteve Rigail (born 1989), Andorran alpine skier
- María Esteve (born 1974), Spanish actress
- Pablo Esteve (1730–1794), Spanish classical composer
- Pedro Esteve (1865–1925), Spanish anarchist in the United States
- Pelegrín Esteve, Spanish sport shooter
- Pere Esteve (1942–2005), Spanish politician
- Wilfrid Esteve (born 1968), French photojournalist
- Yaiza Esteve (born 1994), Spanish actress and singer

== See also ==
- Elizabeth Esteve-Coll (born 1938), British academic
- Esteves, a Portuguese surname
- Estevez, a Spanish surname
