= Juan Carlos Lacal =

Spanish biologist, biochemist, inventor (born 1957)

Juan Carlos Lacal Sanjuán
- Born: March 28, 1957 (age 69)
- Occupations: Biologist, biochemist, inventor and academic

Academic background
- Education: BS., Biology, Biochemistry and Molecular Biology; MS., Biology, Biochemistry and Molecular Biology; PhD., Biochemistry and Molecular Biology
- Alma mater: Autonomous University of Madrid

Juan Carlos Lacal Sanjuán is a Spanish biologist, biochemist, inventor and academic. He is a professor of Research at the Sols-Morreale Biomedical Research Institute, which is run by the Spanish National Research Council (CSIC) and the Autonomous University of Madrid (UAM).

Lacal's research focuses on translational oncology and precision medicine. He is the recipient of the 1992 Salud 2000 Foundation Research Prize, the 1997 Best Communication Award from the European Association for Cancer Research (EACR), and the Antonio Esteve Foundation Research Award in 1999.

== Education and early career ==
Lacal earned bachelor's and master's degrees in Biology, Biochemistry and Molecular Biology in 1979 and a Ph.D. in Biochemistry and Molecular Biology in 1982, all from the Autonomous University of Madrid. He held postdoctoral fellowships funded by the European Molecular Biology Organization (Jan 1983 to Dec 1984), and the Fogarty International Center at NIH (Jan 1985 to Dec 1986) at the Laboratory of Cellular and Molecular Biology, National Cancer Institute.

== Career ==
Lacal joined the LCMB (N.C.I.) as a Visiting Associate in 1987, concurrently working as a Scientific Collaborator in the area of Biochemistry and Molecular Biology at the Spanish National Research Council (CSIC). In 1988, he served as a Scientific Researcher at the CSIC in the Biology and Biomedicine area, while also being the General Secretary of the Spanish Association of Cancer Research (ASEICA) from 1991 to 1994, where he was later appointed vice president in 1995-1996 and President in 1997–1998. Subsequently, he became a member of the Council of the Federation of European Cancer Societies (FECS) and its executive committee in 1997–2000. In 2005, he assumed the position of vice-president of Research and President of the Scientific Advisory Board at TCD Pharma until 2010. He was appointed as a member (1996-2011) and President (2012-2013) of the Council of the European Association for Cancer Research (EACR). He took on the position of deputy director of Translational Oncology at the Jiménez Díaz Foundation in 2013. In 2017, he worked as a Senior Researcher of Translational and Medical Oncology at the Fuenlabrada University Hospital until 2019. He has been serving as a member of the Lilly Foundation Scientific Council for the MEDES initiative, since 2005 and the Scientific Advisory Board of INCLIVA, the Biomedical Research Institute at the Valencia Clinical Hospital since 2011.

Lacal served as Professor of Research at the CSIC from 2002 until 2013, and has held the position since assuming it again in 2019. He has been involved in the organization of multiple national and international congresses, symposia, and meetings.

== Research ==
Lacal has contributed to the field of biology and biochemistry by studying the characterization of the oncogenic Ras p21 function, the involvement of Rho GTPases in cancer and the role of choline kinase alpha (ChoKα) in human carcinogenesis and other diseases. He holds over 90 patents for his inventions including the discovery of ChoKα as a new biomarker and drug target in oncology and the design and characterization of specific inhibitors towards this enzyme.

=== Choline kinase alpha and human diseases ===
Lacal and colleagues established a significant association between increased ChoKα activity and overexpression in human lung, prostate, colorectal and breast cancer, thereby suggesting the potential of ChoKα as a target for a novel anti-tumoral strategy in cancer treatment, along with its potential in identifying early stage non-small-cell lung cancer in patients.

Lacal and collaborators worked on developing ChoKα inhibitors to be used as pharmaceutical approaches and demonstrated that this enzyme is a promising drug target for precision medicine approaches against cancer, malaria, rheumatoid arthritis and inflammatory diseases.

Lacal founded Translational Cancer Drugs Pharma S.L. (TCD Pharma SL) in 2005 and Advanced Marker Discovery S.L. (AMADIX S.L.) in 2010. TCD Pharma promoted the first in human Clinical Trial with RSM932A/TCD717, a potent ChoKα inhibitor.

=== Small GTPases in carcinogenesis ===
Lacal has researched translational oncology throughout his career. In a highly cited collaborative study, he found that the Rho family of GTPases activates the transcription factor NF-kappaB by a mechanism that is independent of Ras and Raf-1 kinases, and that Rho GTPases play a critical role in transcription regulation in the context of carcinogenesis, metastasis, and apoptosis. He also pointed out the evidence indicating that the dysregulation of Rho GTPase signaling is implicated in the process of carcinogenesis, and highlighted the critical role of several members of the small GTPase superfamily in addition to Ras and Rho A, in controlling key cellular signaling functions.

In a study published in Nature, Lacal found that the Ha-ras oncogene activates a novel pathway for 1,2-diacylglycerol production in transformed cells altering the regulation of the phosphatidylcholine biosynthetic pathway. This finding led to the discovery of ChoKα as a biomarker in multiple cancers and a druggable target in a diversity of human pathologies.

== Awards ==
- 1992 – Research Prize, Salud 2000 Foundation
- 1997 – Best Communication Award, European Association for Cancer Research
- 1999 – Research Award, Antonio Esteve Foundation

== Selected articles ==
- Lacal, Juan Carlos; Moscat, Jorge; Aaronson, Stuart A. (19 November 1987). "Novel source of 1,2-diacylglycerol elevated in cells transformed by Ha-ras oncogene". Nature. 330 (6145): 269–272. Bibcode:1987Natur.330..269L. doi:10.1038/330269a0. PMID 3313065.
- Perona, R; Montaner, S; Saniger, L; Sánchez-Pérez, I; Bravo, R; Lacal, J C (15 February 1997). "Activation of the nuclear factor-kappaB by Rho, CDC42, and Rac-1 proteins". Genes & Development. 11 (4): 463–475. doi:10.1101/gad.11.4.463. PMID 9042860.
- Aznar, Salvador; Lacal, Juan Carlos (April 2001). "Rho signals to cell growth and apoptosis". Cancer Letters. 165 (1): 1–10. doi:10.1016/S0304-3835(01)00412-8. PMID 11248412.
- Ramı́rez de Molina, Ana; Rodrı́guez-González, Agustı́n; Gutiérrez, Ruth; Martı́nez-Piñeiro, Luis; Sánchez, José J; Bonilla, Félix; Rosell, Rafael; Lacal, Juan Carlos (August 2002). "Overexpression of choline kinase is a frequent feature in human tumor-derived cell lines and in lung, prostate, and colorectal human cancers". Biochemical and Biophysical Research Communications. 296 (3): 580–583. Bibcode:2002BBRC..296..580R. doi:10.1016/S0006-291X(02)00920-8. PMID 12176020.
- del Pulgar, Teresa Gómez; Benitah, Salvador A.; Valerón, Pilar F.; Espina, Carolina; Lacal, Juan Carlos (June 2005). "Rho GTPase expression in tumourigenesis: Evidence for a significant link". BioEssays. 27 (6): 602–613. doi:10.1002/bies.20238. PMID 15892119.
- Lacal, Juan Carlos; Zimmerman, Tahl; Campos, Joaquín M. (25 May 2021). "Choline Kinase: An Unexpected Journey for a Precision Medicine Strategy in Human Diseases". Pharmaceutics. 13 (6): 788. doi:10.3390/pharmaceutics13060788. PMC 8226952. PMID 34070409.
