= Sergio Erill =

Spanish pharmacologist (1938–2020)

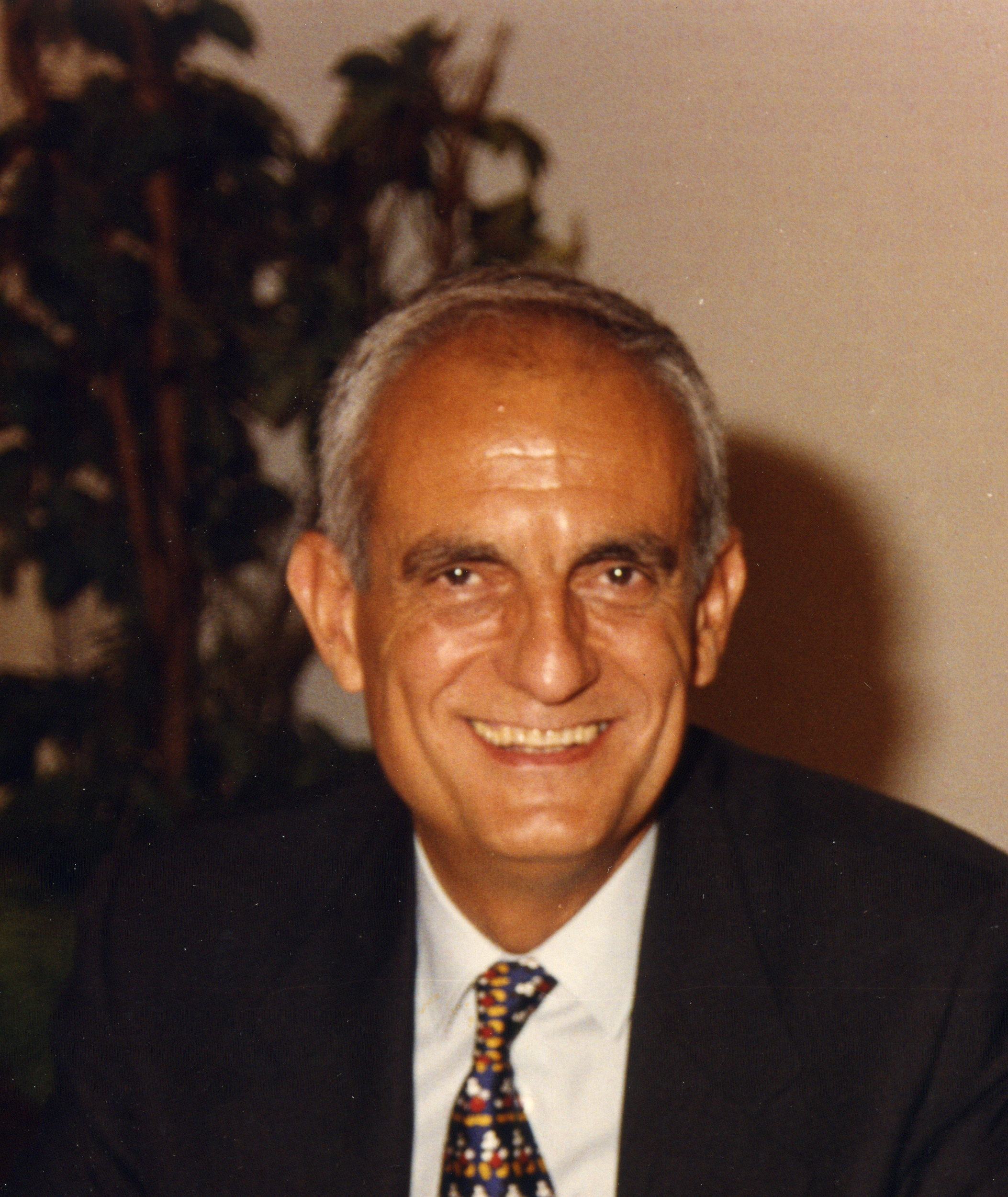
- Sergio Erill in Sant Cugat del Vallès (July 1995)
- Born: Sergio Erill Saéz; 12 October 1938; Barcelona, Spain
- Died: 29 February 2020 (aged 81); San Cugat del Vallés, Barcelona, Spain
- Education: University of Barcelona
- Scientific career
- Fields: Medical research, Clinical pharmacology
- Workplaces: Esteve Foundation
- Doctoral advisor: Agustín Pedro Pons

Sergio Erill Saéz (12 October 1938 – 29 February 2020) was a Catalonian physician, clinical pharmacologist, professor and researcher.

== Biography ==
=== Education and professional experience ===
Sergi Erill was born in Barcelona during the Spanish Civil War. He studied at the Barcelona Lycee Francais and then at the University of Barcelona, where he graduated as a medical doctor in 1963. In 1967 he received his PhD from the University of Barcelona, for his work on antibody detection under the direction of es:Agustín Pedro Pons and ca:Jordi Gras i Riera. That same year, he obtained a Merck International Fellowship in Clinical Pharmacology from the Merck Company Foundation, and initiated his post-doctoral training in clinical pharmacology with internships at the University of Kansas (1967) and the University of Michigan (1968–1969) working with Daniel Azarnoff and Ted Carr. Upon his return to Barcelona, he obtained his Board Certification in Internal Medicine (1970) and Clinical Pharmacology (1983), and was an assistant professor of physiology and pharmacology at the Autonomous University of Barcelona Medical School (1970–1975). In 1976, he became a Professor of Pharmacology, first at the University of the Basque Country (1976–1979) and later at the University of Granada (1980–1983). Returning to Barcelona in 1983, he became the director of the Esteve Foundation and associate professor of Pharmacology at the Université de Montréal, where he taught clinical pharmacology until 1998.

=== Teaching, research and science communication ===
Sergio Erill was president of the Spanish Society of Pharmacology (1982–1986), president of the Spanish Clinical Pharmacology Commission (1978–1981), drug evaluation expert for the WHO (1983–1992), member of the Advisory Committee of the Fundación Juan March (1986–1988), president of the Spanish Pharmacovigilance Committee (1987–1988), scientific director of Esteve (1989-2003), member of the University of Barcelona Bioethics Committee and professor of the MS in Bioethics and Law of the University of Barcelona (1996-2020), among other professional achievements. He was also a member of the Nominating Committee of the International Union of Basic and Clinical Pharmacology (2006-2010). He always took up challenging positions with potential for broader impact in his discipline and in science, but shied away from awards and other recognitions. His main research activity focused on the effects of some diseases on the kinetics and dynamics of drugs. In particular, he performed pioneering studies on the effect of different pathologies, such as chronic kidney disease, respiratory failure, diabetes, heart failure and liver disease, on the attachment of drugs to blood plasma proteins, and the impact of attachment alterations on the kinetics and pharmacological response of drugs. Another active field of research was the impact of disease on the speed of acetylation of procainamide, as a function of genetic polymorphisms in patients.

=== Fundación Dr. Antoni Esteve ===
In 1982 he became the founding director of the Esteve Foundation, one of his most significant contributions. Created by the family of Dr. Antoni Esteve, the Esteve Foundation aimed at promoting the development of pharmacology as a discipline through active dissemination and scientific debate. Sergio Erill embraced this goal and adopted the motto: "not a laboratory for mixing compounds, but a laboratory for mixing scientists" to develop and grow the Foundation across his 37 year tenure as director. The many initiatives he launched as director of the Esteve Foundation can be browsed on the Foundation's website.

=== Bibliography ===
Sergio Erill co-authored more than 120 articles in peer-reviewed journals, as well as over 140 contributions in books, book chapters and monographs . Of note are his late career works on highlighting the role of women in science and making pharmacology concepts accessible to teenagers. He mentored ten PhD students, published science columns in Spanish newspapers La Vanguardia and ECO, contributed regularly to the Jabs & Jibes section of The Lancet and was a member of the editorial board of multiple journals, including Clinical Pharmacology Research, Drugs and Therapeutics Perspectives, Journal of Clinical Epidemiology and Pharmacology and Toxicology.
