= Josep Esteve =

Catalan industrialist (1930–2019)

Josep Esteve i Soler (January 4, 1930 – March 29, 2019) was a Catalan industrialist in the pharmaceutical sector; his father was Antoni Esteve i Subirana and his grandfather was Josep Esteve i Seguí.

== Biography ==
Esteve earned a doctorate in pharmacy from the University of Barcelona. He has been an executive at Dr. Esteve Laboratories, Amilcar Automobile Manufacturer, Esteve Chemical Industry, Explotacions Albareda, Esteve International Products, Polafin Real Estate, Almaón Real Estate, PharmaDerm, Moloos Real Estate, Distriquímica Chemical Distributors, Barcino Laboratory, Esteve Pharmaceuticals, Esteve Group, Sintenovo Pharmaceutics, El Fornal Real Estate and Molina Sport, all of which are headquartered in Barcelona. He has also been the president of Tarrasol Real Estate, Soprem, and Isdin Skin Care.

He was the honorary president of the Esteve Corporation, member of the Princess of Asturias Foundation's board and the president of Esteve Foundation, founded in 1983 by him and his siblings.

In 1984, Esteve received the Creu de Sant Jordi award from the Generalitat de Catalunya (Catalan government) and he was also named Commander of the Civil Order of Health. He was the vice president of the Academy of Medical Sciences of Catalonia and the Balearic Islands until 1983 and the president of the Royal Pharmacy Academy of Catalonia between 2002 and 2004.
