= Cassette =

Cassette may refer to:

== Technology ==
- Cassette (format), a format that contains magnetic tape for audio, video, and data storage and playback
- Cassette tape, or Compact Cassette, a worldwide standard for analog audio recording and playback on cassette
  - Cassette single (or "Cassingle"), a music single in the form of a cassette tape
- Digital Audio Tape (or DAT), a digital audio cassette tape format, mainly used by professionals
- Digital Compact Cassette (or DCC), a short-lived digital audio cassette format aimed at domestic users
- Data cassette, the magnetic tape in plastic housing

== Music ==
- Cassette (New Zealand band), a band from New Zealand
- Cassette (South African band), a band from South Africa
- The Cassettes, a Washington, DC–based "Mystic Country"/Steampunk band formed in 1999
- Album (Public Image Ltd album), a 1986 album called "Cassette" on certain editions

== People ==
- Benny Cassette, American record producer, singer, and songwriter
- Rafa Casette (sometimes misspelled as Rafa Cassette or Rafa Casete, born 1965), Spanish actor and singer

== Other uses ==
- Gene cassette, certain vectors that are normally used to confer a selectable marker on an organism
- Cassette cogset, a set of multiple sprockets on a bicycle
- Cassette munition, a term for Cluster munition common in Slavic languages, particularly Ukrainian (касетні боєприпаси)
- Cassette toilet, a type of portable camping toilet

== See also ==
- Cartridge (disambiguation)
