= Cristina Nevado =

Spanish chemist

- Born: March 1, 1977 (age 49); Madrid
- Education: Autonomous University of Madrid
- Known for: Synthetic chemistry Organometallic chemistry
- Scientific career
- Workplaces: University of Zürich
- Website: Nevado Group

Cristina Nevado (born 1977) is a Spanish chemist who is a professor of Organic Chemistry at the University of Zurich. Her research considers chemical synthesis and organometallic reactions. She received the 2021 Margaret Faul Women in Chemistry Award.

== Early life and education ==
Nevado was born in Madrid and grew up in Spain. She was the first scientist in her family. At high school she was inspired by her chemistry and physics teachers to pursue a career in science. She eventually studied chemistry at the Autonomous University of Madrid, and earned her bachelor's degree in 2000. During one summer holiday she worked at the Menéndez Pelayo International University, where she met international students and realised the scientific community was global. She remained at the Autonomous University for her doctoral research, where she worked on organic chemistry and the cyclisation of enynes that had been catalysed by gold and platinum complexes. After earning her doctorate, Nevado moved to the Max Planck Institute for Coal Research, where she worked as a postdoctoral fellow with Alois Fürstner. Her postdoctoral research considered natural product synthesis. She spent three months working alongside Eiichi Nakamura at the University of Tokyo.

== Research and career ==
Nevado joined the University of Zurich as an assistant professor in 2007. Her research has concentrated on catalysis and the development of selective, sustainable approaches to develop new materials. In particular, Nevado is interested in new approaches to construct C–C and C–X bonds based on transition metal catalysts. In 2011 Nevado was awarded a Starting Grant from the European Research Council to develop catalysts based on nature. These gold(I) and gold(III)-catalytic tools look to promote the synthesis of biologically relevant small molecules with high levels of stereocontrol. She was promoted to professor in 2013. Nevado develops computational tools to study biological processes in an effort to understand cancer metastasis and progression.

She serves on the editorial board of the ACS Central Science and the advisory board of the Reaxys Doctoral Prize.

== Awards and honours ==
- 2008 Spanish Royal Society of Chemistry Young Investigator Award
- 2011 Thieme Chemistry Journals Award
- 2011 Chemical Society Review Emerging Investigator Award
- 2013 Swiss Chemical Society Werner Prize
- 2019 Royal Society of Chemistry Organometallic Chemistry
- 2021 Margaret Faul Women in Chemistry Award

== Selected publications ==
- Cristina Nieto-Oberhuber; M Paz Muñoz; Elena Buñuel; Cristina Nevado; Diego J Cárdenas; Antonio M Echavarren (1 April 2004). "Cationic gold(I) complexes: highly alkynophilic catalysts for the exo- and endo-cyclization of enynes". Angewandte Chemie International Edition. 43 (18): 2402–2406. doi:10.1002/anie.200353207. ISSN 1433-7851. PMID 15114573. Wikidata Q80010903.
- Andrés García-Domínguez; Cristina Nevado (1 April 2018). "Transforming Olefins into Dinucleophiles". Chimia. 72 (4): 212–215. doi:10.2533/chimia.2018.212. ISSN 0009-4293. PMID 29720311. Wikidata Q88546952.
- Cristina Nevado (1 January 2010). "Gold catalysis: recent developments and future trends". Chimia. 64 (4): 247–251. doi:10.2533/chimia.2010.247. ISSN 0009-4293. PMID 21138191. Wikidata Q37817429.
