= Teresa Sagales =

Spanish physician and neurophysiologist

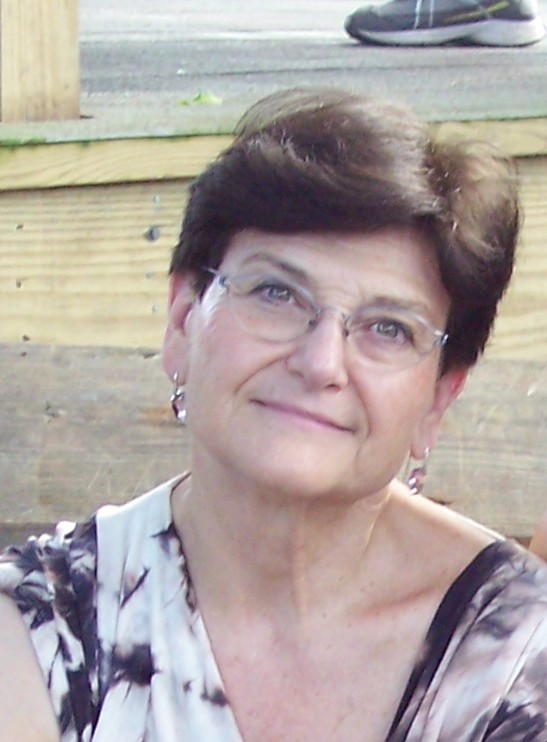
- Teresa Sagalés in Baltimore, MD (May 2010)
- Born: Teresa Sagalés Sala; 1943 (age 82–83); Barcelona, Spain
- Education: University of Barcelona
- Known for: Research in sleep disorders and neurophysiology
- Scientific career
- Fields: Clinical neurophysiology
- Workplaces: Vall d'Hebron University Hospital

Teresa Sagalés Sala is a Catalonian physician, clinical neurophysiologist and researcher.

== Early life and education ==
Teresa Sagalés was born in Barcelona a few years after the end of the Spanish Civil War. After graduating as a medical doctor at the University of Barcelona, she married clinical pharmacologist Sergio Erill and moved to the United States, where she initiated her professional career working under neuropharmacologist Edward F. Domino on the effects of stress, psychoactive agents and REM sleep deprivation on sleep patterns at the University of Michigan. Upon her return to Spain, Sagalés began her tenure as a clinical neurophysiologist at the Vall d'Hebron University Hospital, one of the principal tertiary hospitals in Catalonia, where she pioneered sleep research in Spain.

== Career ==
Sagalés developed her career mainly at the Vall d'Hebron University Hospital, first as a clinician and then as Head of the Clinical Neurophysiology Service from 1991 until her retirement. Her clinical work established Vall d'Hebron University Hospital as a premier center for sleep medicine and neurophysiology in Europe and was integrated within the hospital's neuroscience area, collaborating with departments including neurology, otorhinolaryngology, pneumology and other related specialties.

Following early work on electroencephalography (EEG), electromyography (EMG) and evoked potentials with Maria Dolores de la Calzada, Sagales is credited with initiating the field of clinical sleep research in Spain, performing the first polysomnographies as early as 1972 and extensive work in electrooculography and its clinical applications in the early 1980s.

Sagalés has been a prominent leader in several scientific societies and organizations. She was a founding member of the Spanish Sleep Society (SES), member of the Spanish Health Ministry Clinical Neurophysiology Commission, president and secretary of the Catalan Society for Clinical Neurophysiology, member of the executive committee for the European Chapter International Federation of Clinical Neurophysiology (IFCN), international delegate for the Spanish Society for Clinical Neurophysiology, and a prominent member of the European Sleep Research Society, where she co-founded the Forum for Women in Sleep Research.

== Research ==
The research career of Sagalés spans, among other, large-scale epidemiological studies, neurophysiological studies of neurological disorders like Multiple Sclerosis and Parkinson's, and the application of quantitative EEG for analyzing sleep microstructure.

Together with Maurice M Ohayon and other prominent sleep researchers, in 1997 Sagales developed and promoted the adoption of the Sleep-EVAL System as a standardized method to perform population studies on sleep health. Leveraging this methodology, she conducted the first systematic epidemiological studies of sleep patterns in the Spanish population, generating the first comprehensive data on the prevalence of insomnia across the Spanish population.

She has also contributed to reference works in sleep medicine, particularly in areas related to polysomnography, sleep monitoring, and diagnostic evaluation.

Besides her extensive research publication record, Sagales authored multiple sections of the reference textbook on sleep in Spain, "A treaty on sleep medicine".
