= Luisa Martín Rojo =

Spanish linguist (born 1961)

Luisa Martín Rojo (born 1961) is a Spanish linguist researcher at the Universidad Autónoma de Madrid (UAM), and a visiting professor at the ARC Research Centre of City University of New York (CUNY). At UAM, she heads the Interdisciplinary Research Center MIRCo (Multilingualism, Discourse and Communication), and she is listed as a founder and former president of the Iberian Discourse and Society Association (EDISo).

== Biography ==
Martin Rojo earned her BA and PhD degrees at the Universidad de Valladolid, Spain. She specializes in sociolinguistics and she has published research focusing on multilingualism in areas that include traditional education and related activities, especially as it affects Hispanic populations. Recently she has begun studying the ways by which people who engage in protest movements can transform urban areas. Her published research studies, which have appeared in national and international journals, focus on multilingualism outside traditional educational arenas.

=== Research ===
Through her work, Martin Rojo has studied the ways in which cultural and linguistic differences are managed in Madrid schools, how inequality has been constructed in society, and how it is naturalized and legitimized through discourse. She has given special emphasis to the roles played by migrants in the media through demonstrations and daily discourse, as well as the societal consequences of those voices.

As an active member of the European Science Foundation College of Expert Reviewers, Martin Rojo holds the title of national expert given by the European Observatory against Racism and Xenophobia (EU).

She has continued her role as chief investigator at the UAM Centre for Multilingualism, Discourse and Communication Research (MIRCo).

=== Editorial activities ===
She serves as an associate editor of several journals, including Discourse & Society, Journal of Language and Politics, Spanish in Context, Critical Discourse Studies and Journal of Multicultural Discourses.
