= Estevez =

Estévez, or Estevez in English, is a Galician family name. It is a patronymic, meaning son of Stephen, in Galician Estevo. The English equivalent would be Stephenson or Stevenson, the Portuguese equivalent is Esteves, the Italian equivalent is Di Stefano and Stefani and the Spanish equivalent is Estébanez, from the Spanish name Esteban.

The name may refer to:

== People ==
=== Estevez acting family ===
A family of American actors.

=== Other people ===
- Abilio Estévez (born 1954), Cuban novelist, playwright, and poet
- Antonio Estévez (1916–1988), Venezuelan composer
- Don Francisco Estévez source of name for Estevez Palace, since 1880 office of the President of Uruguay.
- Camilo Estévez (bishop) (died 1999), Spanish bishop of the Palmarian Catholic Church
- Carlos Estévez (baseball) (born 1992), Dominican baseball player
- Carmen Fraga Estévez (born 1948), Spanish politician and Member of the European Parliament
- Emilio Estevez Tsai (born 1998), Canadian soccer player
- Eric Estevez, American politician
- Felipe de Jesús Estévez (born 1946), American Roman Catholic bishop
- Gabriela Estévez (born 1978), Argentine politician
- Horacio Estevez (1940–1996), Venezuelan sprinter
- João Rodrigues Esteves (1700–1751), Portuguese composer
- Joaquín Estévez (born 1984), Argentinian professional golfer
- Joaquín Madolell Estévez (1923–2011), military personnel spy from Melilla
- Jorge Medina Estévez (1926–2021), Chilean bishop and cardinal
- Luis Estevez (1930–2014), Cuban-born American fashion designer and costume designer
- Maximiliano Estévez (born 1977), Argentine footballer
- Reyes Estévez (born 1976), Spanish European championship runner
- Roberto Estévez (1957–1982), Argentine soldier, awarded posthumously with the Argentine Nation to the Heroic Valour in Combat Cross
- Scarlett Estevez (born 2007), American actress
- Sumito Estévez (born 1965), Venezuelan chef
- Jose Estevez (born 1963), Cuban/Australian Doctor

== Fictional characters ==
- Dano Estevez, character from the film Final Destination 2
- Sheen Estevez, character from the CGI television series and film The Adventures of Jimmy Neutron, Boy Genius
