= Autonomous University of Madrid =

Spanish public university in Madrid

- Universidad Autónoma de Madrid
- Seal of the Autonomous University of Madrid
- Other names: UAM, La Autónoma
- Motto: Latin: Quid Ultra Faciam?
- Motto in English: What Else Shall We Do?
- Type: Public autonomous university
- Established: 6 June 1968
- Academic affiliations: EUA, CRUE, SSU
- Budget: €334.4 million (2020)
- Rector: Amaya Mendikoetxea Pelayo
- Academic staff: 2,505 (2015/16)
- Administrative staff: 1,036 (2015/16)
- Undergraduates: 21,203 (2015/16)
- Postgraduates: 6,701 (2015/16)
- Doctoral students: 3,818 (2015/16)
- Location: Madrid, Spain; 40.5453°N 3.69611°W
- Campus: Rural, 650 acres (260 ha)
- Colours: Green
- Website: www.uam.es

The Autonomous University of Madrid (Spanish: Universidad Autónoma de Madrid; UAM), commonly known as la Autónoma, is a Spanish public university located in Madrid, Spain. The university was founded in 1968 by royal decree. UAM is widely respected as one of the most prestigious universities in Europe. According to the QS World University Rankings 2022, UAM is ranked as the top university in Spain and has consistently ranked as #1 in Spain in the El País University rankings, published annually. Among its notable alumni, which include every president that the Supreme Court of Spain and Constitutional Court of Spain has had, is the current King of Spain, Felipe VI, who studied the Licenciatura en Derecho (Law) and is the president of UAM’s alumni society.

The campus of the university spans a rural tract of 650 acres (260 ha), mostly around metropolitan Madrid. Founded in 1968, its main campus, Cantoblanco, is located near the cities of Alcobendas, San Sebastián de los Reyes and Tres Cantos. UAM's Cantoblanco Campus holds most of the university's facilities. It is located 15 km (9.3 mi) north of Madrid and has an extension of over 2,200,000 m^{2} (24,000,000 sq ft). Of these, nearly 770,000 m^{2} (8,300,000 sq ft) are urbanised and about a third of them are garden areas. UAM offers 94 doctorate programs across the university. It also offers 88 master's degrees.

According to a study carried out by the newspaper El Mundo, in 2021, UAM was the best university in the country to study biology, nursing, medicine, physics and law, within the 50 careers with the highest demand.

== History ==
The Stabilization Plan of 1959 and the development plans of the 1960s boosted the Spanish economy after years of austerity and the self-sufficiency-based economy. The end of diplomatic and economic isolation led to an economic boom in Spain that resulted in the consolidation of a middle class similar to that of other Western European nations. The demand for higher education increased, and the Spanish university system grew increasingly congested.

The Autonomous University of Madrid was established by the 5-1968 Decree approved by the Spanish Council of Ministers during the Francoist dictatorship along with the Autonomous University of Barcelona and the University of Bilbao. This decree was sponsored by the then-Minister of Science and Education, José Luis Villar Palasí, in order to restructure the Spanish university system. The name Universidad Autónoma de Madrid first appeared in an executive order by the Ministry which was published on 13 August 1968.

On 8 June 2018 the Autonomous University of Madrid celebrated its 50th anniversary with a series of commemorative events.

== Campuses ==
=== Main campus ===
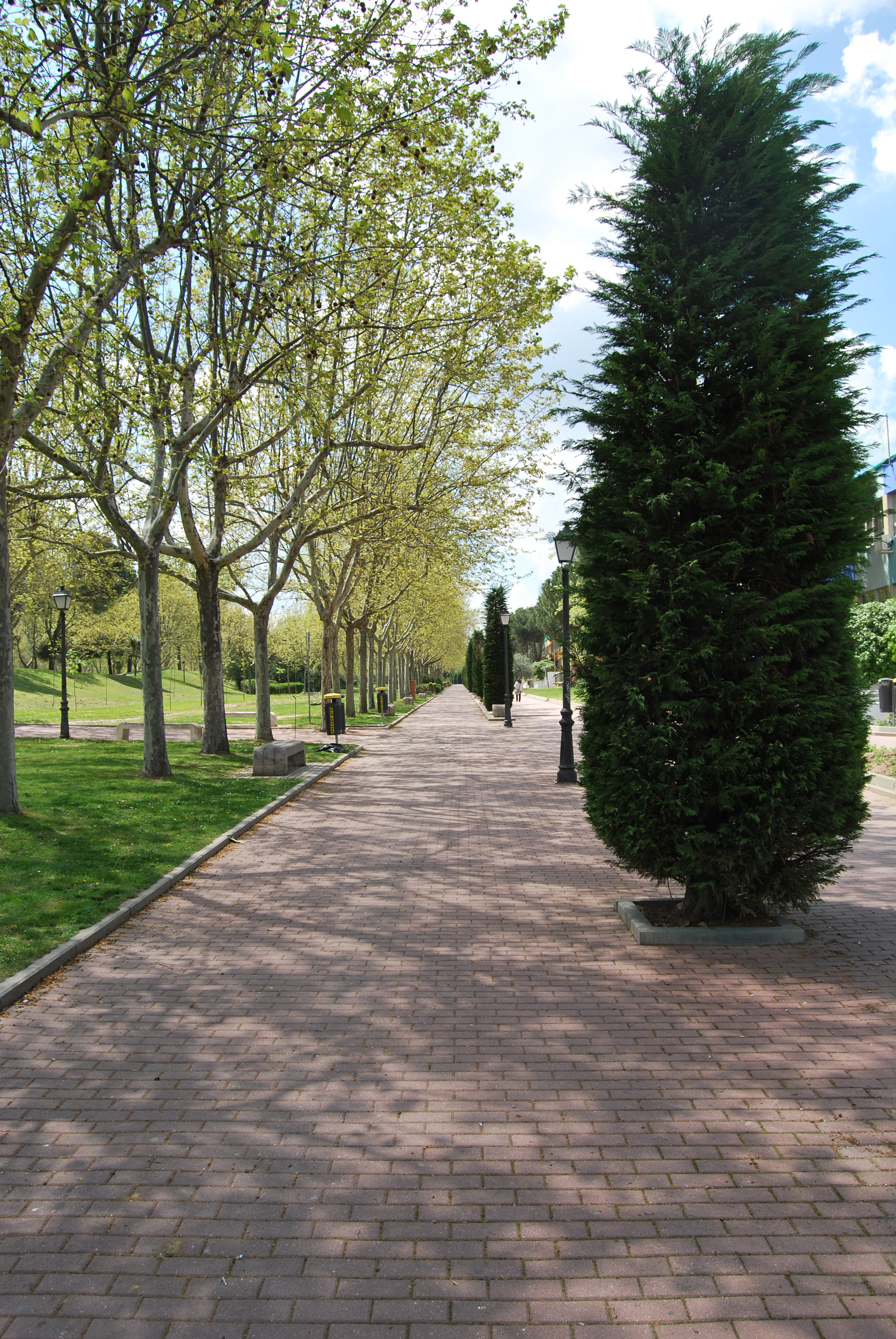
The Cantoblanco Campus, October 2010

UAM's Cantoblanco Campus is home to most of the university's facilities. It is located 15 km north of Madrid and has an extension of over 2,200,000 m^{2}. Of these are nearly 770,000 are urbanised and about a third of them are garden areas. The campus was designed as a university town that was to be self-sufficient, but also would be situated away from Madrid in order to keep student activity against the Francoist dictatorship away from the capital.

Initially, the campus held the faculties of philosophy and liberal arts, law, economics, business management, and science, as well as the rectorate, several other service buildings and sports facilities. The university's other facilities, the faculty of medicine and the teacher training Santa Maria school are in downtown Madrid. There are two other teacher training schools in Segovia and in Cuenca. Over the years, the faculty of psychology, the biology building of the faculty of sciences, the new faculty of law (that allowed the transfer of the teacher training school to the main campus, and that was later transformed in faculty of education and teacher training) along with its political science annex building, the polytechnic school (initially superior technical school of computing engineers), the libraries of humanities and sciences, as well as the Erasmus of Rotterdam dormitory have been built on the main campus.

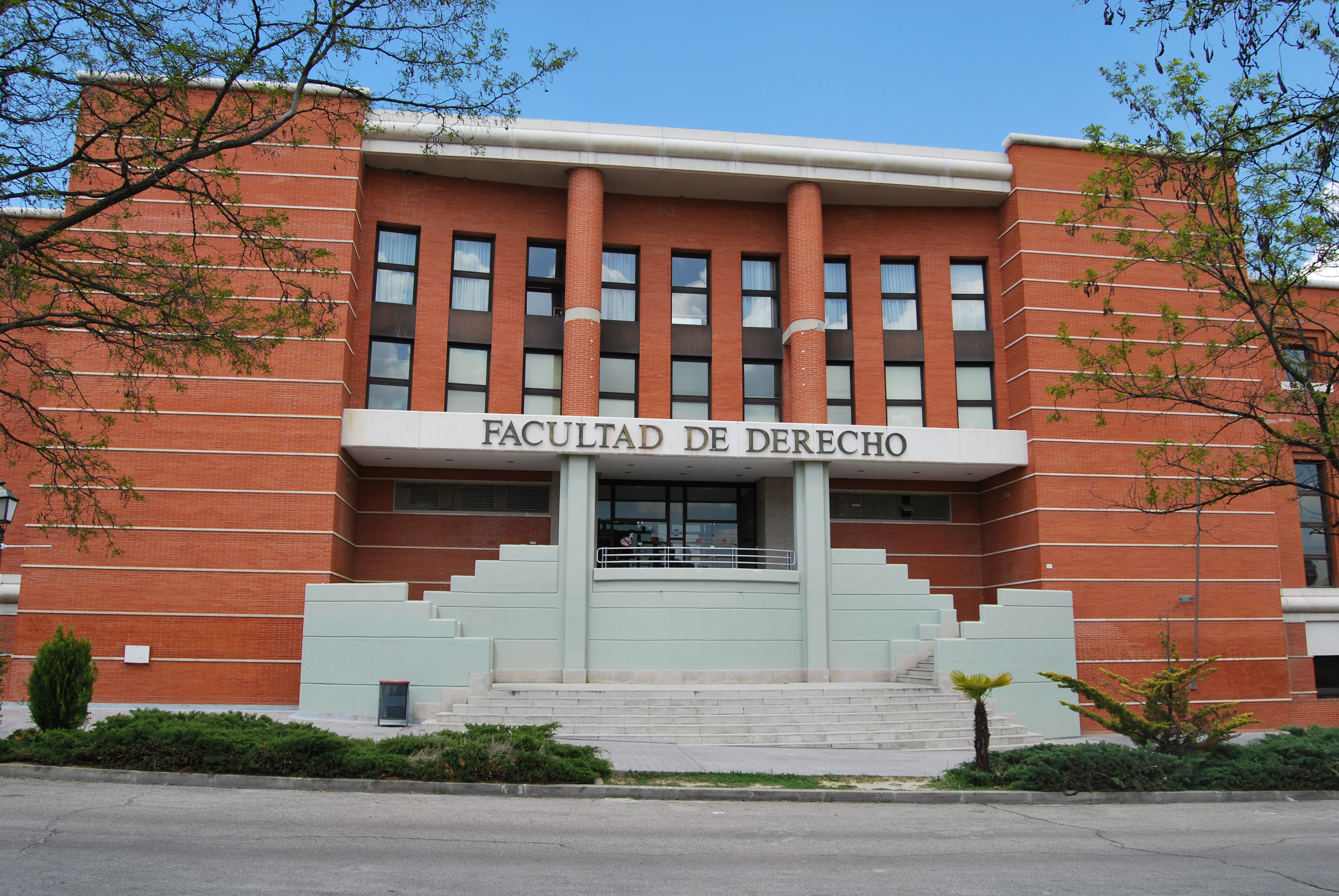
Faculty of Law (Facultad de Derecho), October 2010

The original faculties were housed in interconnected buildings with several patios in between them. Characteristic to each building is a large number of stairs in its corridors, initially designed to prevent students from running in case of police raids. Currently, this fact has been considered by many university officials as a setback in the integration of handicapped students. The newest facilities were built in a contemporary style, being more accessible and allowing more free movement to students. Sporting facilities include two swimming pools (an indoor one and an outdoor one), two multiple-use pavilions, and outdoor tennis, football, basketball, paddle tennis, rugby, and futsal and beach volleyball courts.

Other services on campus include 16 cafeterias and other eating facilities, medical services, a pharmacy with optic care, a foreign languages pavilion, and a bookstore. The campus also houses several research facilities partnered with the Spanish Scientific Research Council (CSIC). Cantoblanco Campus is accessible by train belonging to Renfe Cercanias Commuter service (station Cantoblanco-Universidad), or by the Madrid Region Commuter Bus service. The campus is located in the B1 area of the Madrid Transports Consortium.

=== Medicine campus ===
UAM's faculty of medicine is located north of Madrid near La Paz teaching hospital (that acts as one of the faculty's teaching hospitals, as Puerta de Hierro Majadahonda Hospital, La Princesa Hospital, Niño Jesús Hospital and Fundación Jiménez Díaz do). It was inaugurated in 1969. Juan Luis Vives Residence Hall was UAM's first residential facility. It is located in the Plaza Castilla area in northern Madrid. It has 130 residents and holds several cultural activities for the university.

=== La Cristalera ===
La Cristalera residence is located in Miraflores de la Sierra, a village north of Madrid that was acquired by the university in 1989. It is used for conferences and meetings and is the main centre of UAM's summer courses.

== Academic organization ==
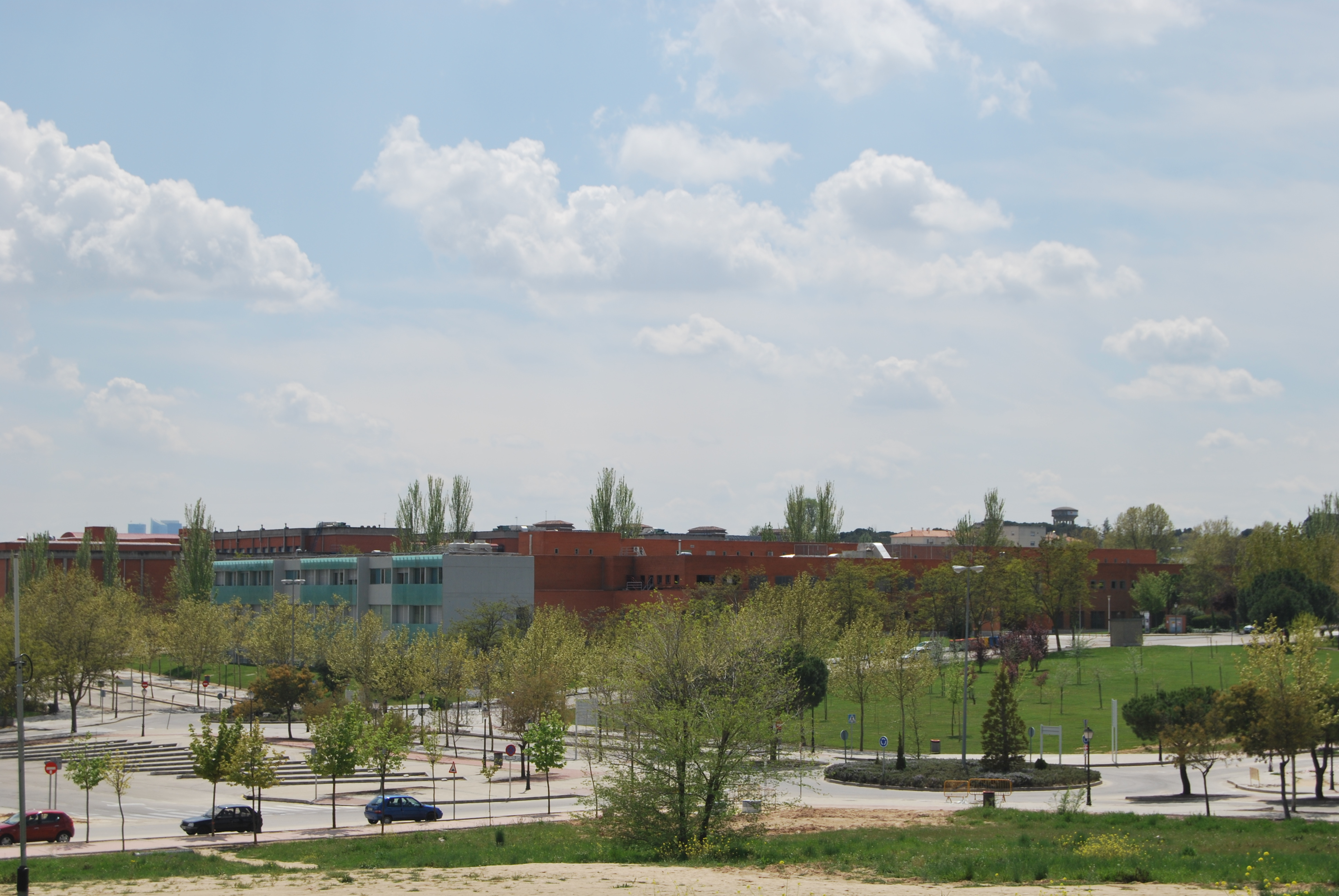
The central campus in October 2010.

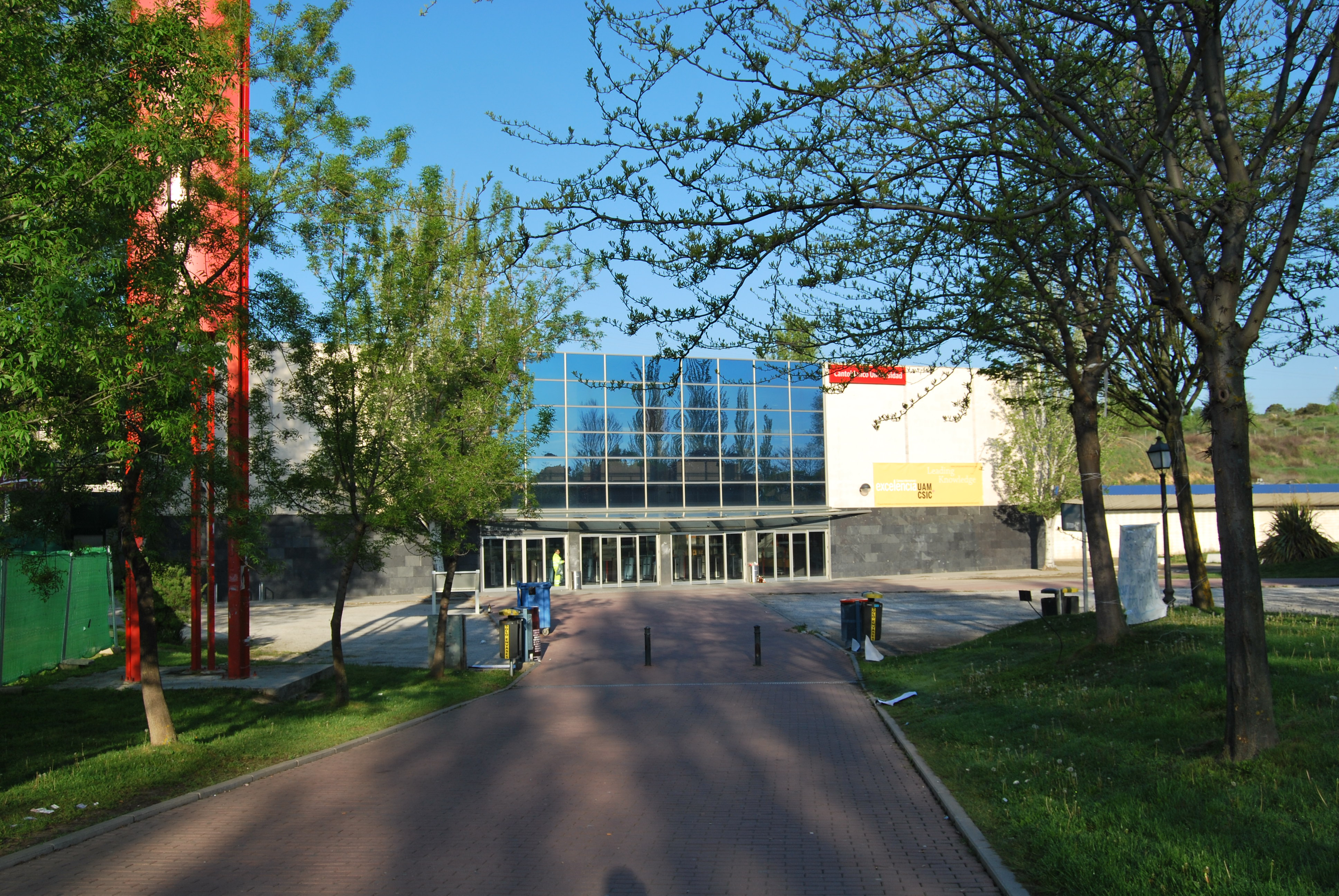
The university's train station, October 2010

The UAM is divided into eight faculties and superior schools that support and coordinate most of the university's academic and administrative activity. Each faculty is divided into departments that coordinate the teaching and research of the different subjects. Researchers can organise into research institutes in order to coordinate their activities in a specific research field. The university totals up to 59 departments and eight research institutes. In addition to these, the UAM has seven associate schools, which are not completely part of UAM's administrative structure, but issue UAM-recognised titles and are under UAM's academic regulations.

Faculties and superior schools:

- Faculty of Philosophy and Liberal Arts
- Faculty of Law
- Faculty of Economic Science and Business Management
- Faculty of Sciences
- Faculty of Medicine
- Faculty of Psychology
- Engineering School (until 2002 Superior School of Computer Engineers)
- Faculty of Teacher Training and Education (until 2002 Santa Maria School of Teacher Training)

Associate schools are:

- Red Cross School of Nursing
- Puerta de Hierro School of Nursing
- Jimenez Diaz Foundation School of Nursing
- ONCE School of physiotherapy
- LaSalle Institute of Higher Education
- Escuela de Gemología

== Administrative organisation ==
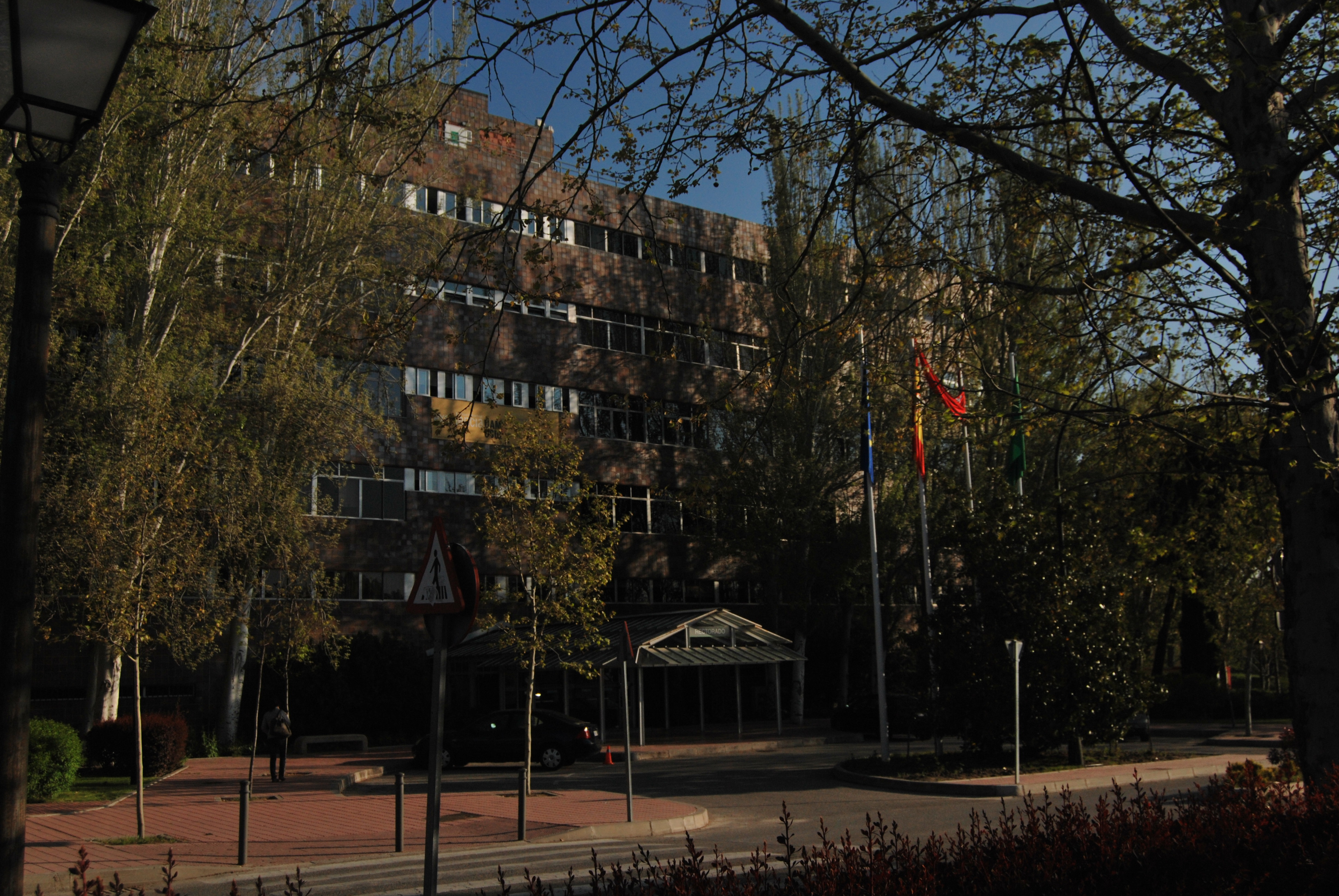
Rectorate building, October 2010

UAM administration is established according to the 2023 Organic Law of the University System (LOSU). The Senior Academic and Administrative Officer of the Autonomous University of Madrid is the rector, who must be, by law, a chair professor serving in the university, elected every four years with a two-term limit by universal graded suffrage. The current rector is Amaya Mendikoetxea, chair of English Linguistics, who was elected in 2021, becoming the second woman Rector of the University. The rector appoints an indefinite number of vice-rectors to lead different administrative departments of the university (such as Student affairs or Graduate academic affairs), and a secretary general coordinating the rector's team and overseeing the legal procedures of the university, as well as university protocol. Per the university's social board, the rector also designates the manager as part of his team, which oversees the university's economic and administrative activity.

The grades assigned to each sector for rectoral elections in UAM according to its charter are:

- Full professors: 51% of the final votes
- Students: 28% of the final votes
- Other professors: 9%
- Non-teaching personnel: 9%
- Teaching and research personnel in training: 3%.

UAM's collective government bodies are the University Assembly, The Board of Governors, and The Social Board. The University Assembly is made up of 153 full professors, 84 students, 27 hired, associate, or emeritus professors, 27 members of the non-teaching personnel, 9 research or teaching trainees, the rector, the secretary-general, and the manager. It is the highest representative body of the university. It elaborates the university's general guidelines, changes or passes a new university charter, elects twenty members of the Board of Governors, and elects the university Ombudsman.

The Board of Governors is the ordinary governmental body of the university. It controls and passes regulations on most of the university's academic, personnel, and administrative issues. It is composed of the rector, the secretary-general, the manager, 20 members elected by the assembly according to its composition, all the deans and the head of the polytechnic school, 7 heads of department, a head of a research institute, 15 members designated by the rector and three members of the Social Board.

The Social Board is the body responsible for the relations between the university and society. Its members are designated by trade unions, the municipality of Madrid, employers unions, companies related to the university, the Madrid Assembly and the Board of Governors of the university. It also oversees the universities financial activities and passes the university budget. Its current chairman is Manuel Pizarro.

Faculties are headed by a dean, whilst the responsible of the polytechnic school is called head. They are elected in the same way as the rector and have also a limit of two four-year terms. They are aided by vice deans or deputy heads. They are overseen by a faculty or school board. Departments are led by the head of the department and overseen by the department council.

== Studies ==
=== Undergraduate ===
UAM offers Spanish undergraduates fully recognized degrees. There are the Diplomatura and Ingenierías Técnicas (technical engineering), which are three-year studies equivalent to an associate degree. Licenciaturas and Ingenierías Superiores are four to five years studies equivalent to a bachelor's degree. Along with that, UAM offers second level licenciaturas, which allow people who have a diplomatura to obtain a licenciatura by taking courses. In other case, they must have at least the first two or three years of a licenciatura and combined degree, which are very popular among Spanish students. They also offer courses in languages other than Spanish.

In addition to the Faculties where the degrees on the different fields of knowledge and science are studied —Faculty of Science, F. of Business and Economic Science, F. of Law, F. of Philosophy and the Arts, F. of Teacher Training and Education, F. of Psychology, F. of Medicine and School of Engineering— there are external centers that teach specific studies and their associated degree: "La Salle" Centre of Higher Education, The Red Cross School of Nursing, The Jimenez Diaz Foundation University School of Nursing, The ONCE University School of Physioterapy.

=== Graduate ===
UAM offers 94 PhD programs in all of the universities programs. It also offers 72 master's degrees, and with the implementation of the Bologna Process 16 recognised master's degrees for the academic year of 2006–07.

== Research ==
In addition, the alliance of the four leading Spanish public Universities, two in Madrid (Autónoma University of Madrid and Universidad Carlos III) and two in Barcelona (Universitat Autònoma de Barcelona, Universitat Pompeu Fabra) allows close collaboration between projects and researchers.

== Reputation ==
University rankings

Global – Overall
- ARWU World: 301–400 (2023)
- QS World: 206 (2026)
- THE World: 351–400 (2024)
- USNWR Global: =231 (2023)

The UAM was ranked first amongst Spanish universities by the El Mundo University Supplement (known as "Las 50 Carreras"). It has also consistently ranked as the #1 law school in Spain for the past 100 years. For the subject "Mathematics" the university was ranked within top 51-75 universities in the world (within top 12 in Europe). It was the Spanish university with the most researchers among the most cited according to the Thomson Reuters ranking citation in 2011.

== Student life ==
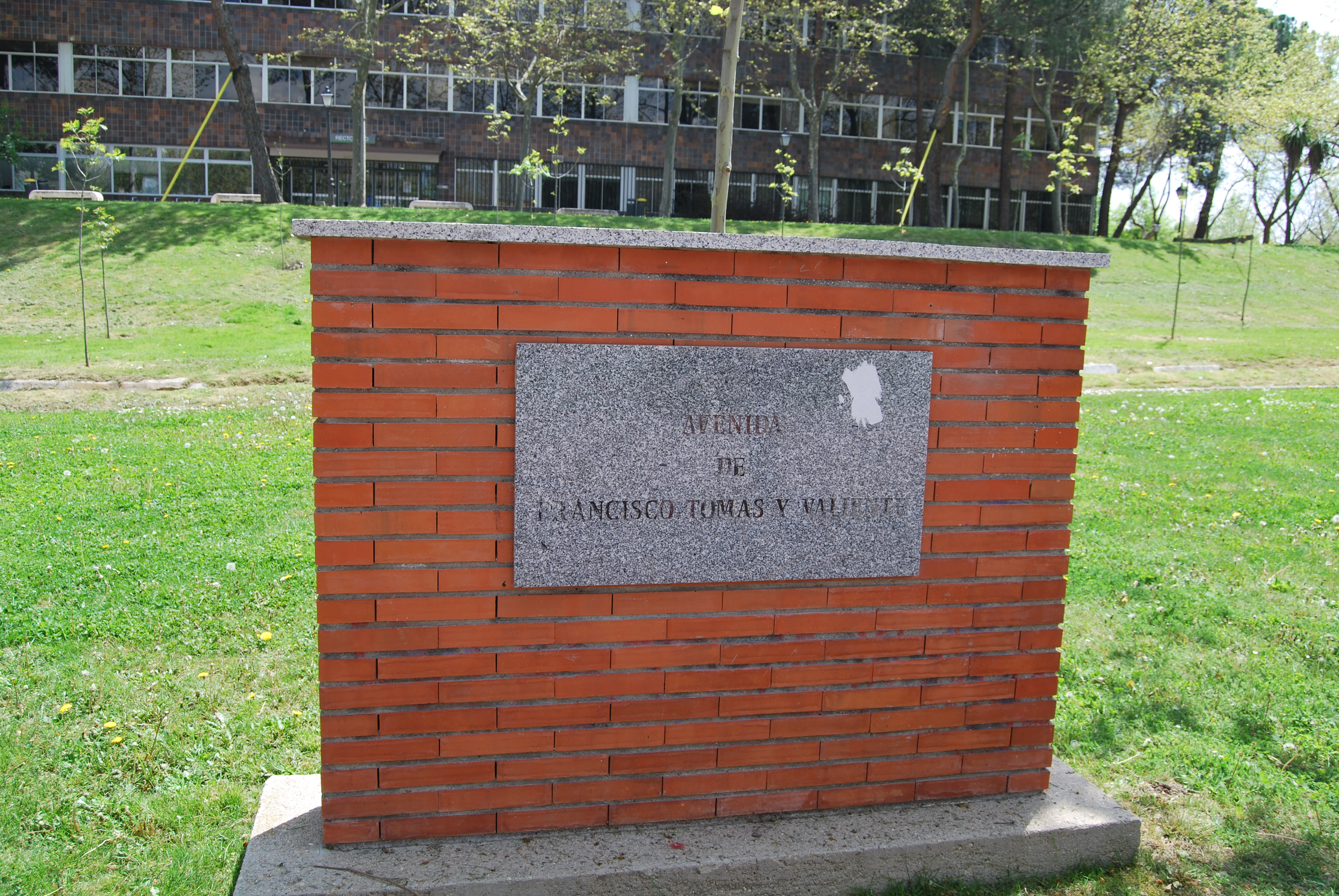
Francisco Tomás y Valiente Avenue. Tomas Y Valiente was murdered by ETA in his office at the Faculty of Law in 1996

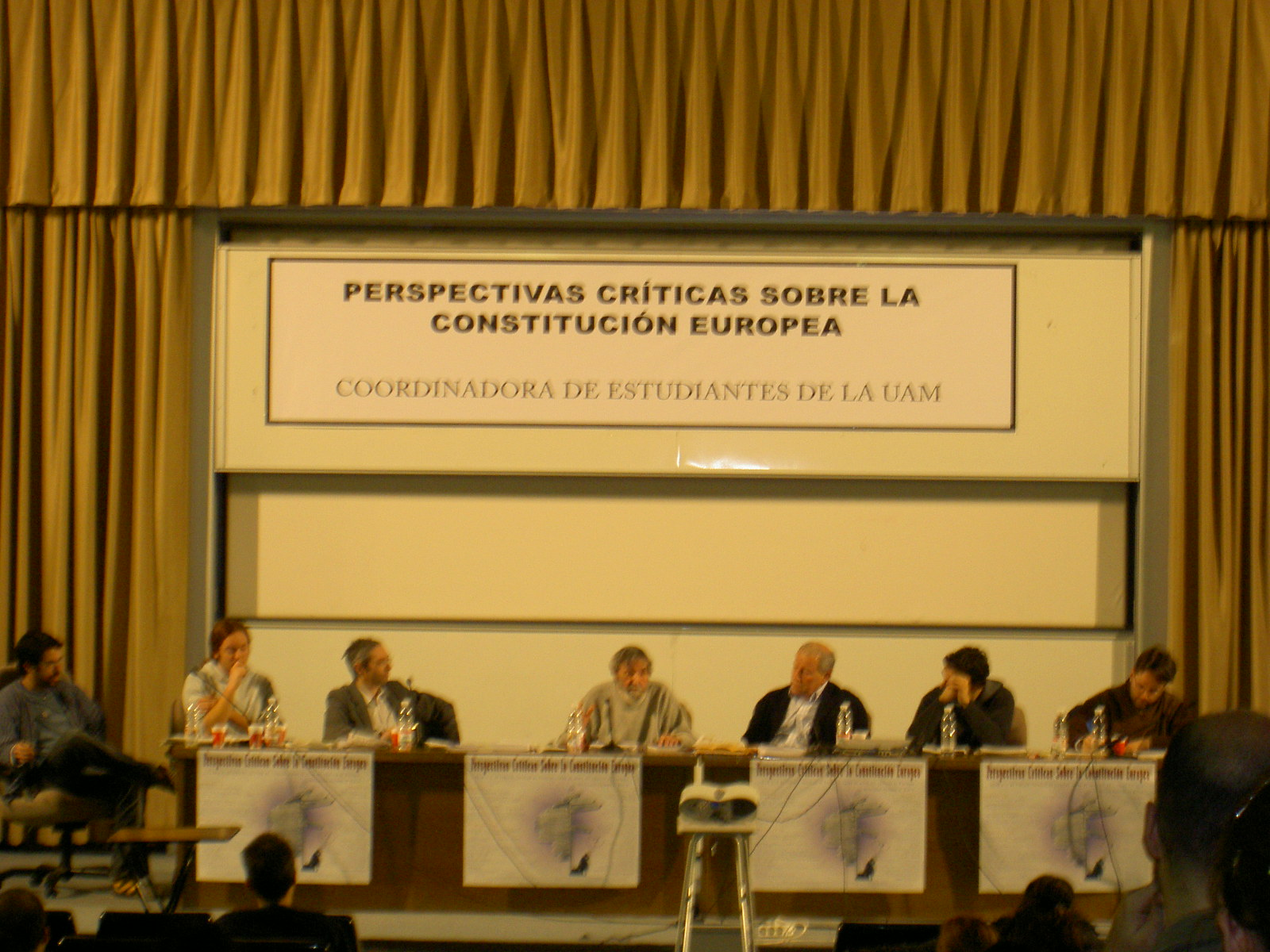
A panel debate at UAM in 2005

=== Societies and compromise ===
The Autonomous University of Madrid has an active student body, having organised one of Spain's most important events against the dictatorship in 1976 called the Iberian Peoples Festival. It had an attendance of over 70,000. UAM has over a hundred student societies covering activities ranging from student unionism to theatre and music. The oldest active association in UAM is the Law Students Association (AED in Spanish), a left-leaning student union established in 1981. Furthermore, there are new prominent societies in the field of social sciences, such a Debate Society (Sociedad de Debates UAM) and a Model UN society (UAM-I-MUN), both founded and run mainly by law students.

UAM does not have a formal student government body, as it has been rejected by students in several occasions, and instead students elect different student unions (usually with difference on political issues) to the different university government bodies.

In recent years, UAM students have organised massively to protest against terrorism, after the assassination of Francisco Tomas y Valiente by ETA in 1995, against the Organic Law of Universities in 2001, to clean Spain's northern coast after the Prestige oil spill in 2002, against the War in Iraq in 2003, to assist to the II European Social Forum also in 2003, and in solidarity with the victims of the 11 March 2004 Madrid train bombings.

=== Festivals and parties ===
UAM is also a festive campus, holding several festivals during spring. The most important one was the Spring festival held until 1993, but halted due to overcrowding. Since then minor festivals have been held by student associations. These festivals usually consist of rock concerts by amateur rock bands (many of which have members that are UAM) from midday until dusk. According to university regulations, festival profits have to be destined to charities or to the organisation of cultural events. In 2005, due to overcrowding of the festivals that led to several problems, university officials suspended further festivals until a more convenient place for their celebration would be found. Thus, no festivals were held in 2006.

== Notable alumni ==
=== Royalty ===
- King Felipe VI of Spain, Law
- Queen Sofia of Spain, studied Humanities, beginning her studies as Princess of Spain and finishing them as Queen of Spain.

=== Politics ===
- Beatriz Corredor, Former Minister of Housing
- Cristina Garmendia, Former Minister of Innovation and Science
- Cristobal Montoro, Former Minister of Finance
- Diego López Garrido, Socialist parliamentary spokesman at the 8th legislature
- Dolores Delgado, former Minister of Justice
- Gaspar Llamazares, Former United Left Party leader
- Irene Montero, Minister of Equality
- Rosalinda López Hernández, Mexican Senator
- Santiago Cabanas Ansorena, Former Ambassador of the Kingdom of Spain to the United States
- Trinidad Jiménez, Former Minister of Foreign Affairs
- Ángel Gabilondo, Former Minister of Education and Universities,

=== Media ===
- Carlos Bardem, actor and writer
- Lorena Berdún, TV host and actress
- Macarena García, actress
- Pepe Viyuela, actor and clown
- Rafa Casette, actor and singer

=== Literature ===
- Mercedes Castro, writer
- Marcos Giralt Torrente, writer
- Belén Gopegui, novelist and screenwriter
- Rocío Orsi, philosopher and essayist
- Alfonso Vallejo, playwright and poet

=== Business ===
- Abdulla Ghanim Almuhannadi, journalist, editor, and Qatari businessman
- Borja Prado (born 1956), businessman, chairman of Endesa

=== Science ===
- Eva Barreno (born 1950), botanist and lichenologist
- Beatriz Rico, neuroscientist
- Cristina Nevado (born 1977), organometallic chemist
- David Garcia, computer scientist
- Jeannine Davis-Kimball (1929–2017), archaeologist
- Juan Carlos Lacal (born 1957), biologist, biochemist
- Biola Javierre (born 1983), biologist, biochemist

== Noted faculty and researchers ==
- Severo Ochoa, Medicine Nobel laureate
- Margarita Salas, molecular biologist and member of the Royal Spanish Academy
- Francisco Tomás y Valiente, chief justice of the Constitutional Court of Spain (1986–1992), murdered by ETA
- Pedro Cruz Villalón, chief justice of the Constitutional Court of Spain (1998–2001)
- Enrique Tierno Galván, Mayor of Madrid (1986–1989)
- Antonio Remiro Brotóns, international lawyer and academic
- Aurelio Menéndez Menéndez, former Minister of Education and Science.
- Javier Solana, EU High Representative for the Common Foreign and Security Policy
- Nicolas Cabrera, physicist
- María Ángeles Durán (born 1942), sociologist and economist
- Federico Mayor Zaragoza, former UNESCO director general
- José Ignacio Wert, minister of Education, Culture and Sport
- Diego García-Borreguero, Director of the Sleep Research Institute in Madrid, Spain
- Antonio M. Echavarren, chemist who has contributed to recent advances in gold and palladium chemistry.
- Gabriella Morreale de Escobar, chemist and pioneering thyroid researcher
- Luisa Martín Rojo, linguist and researcher

== List of rectors ==
- Luis Sánchez Agesta (1970–1972)
- Julio Rodríguez Martínez (1972–1973)
- Gratiniano Nieto Gallo (1973–1978)
- Pedro Martínez Montávez (1978–1982)
- Julio González Campos (1982–1984)
- Josefina Gómez Mendoza (1984–1985)
- Cayetano López Martínez (1985–1994)
- Raúl Villar Lázaro (1994–2002)
- Ángel Gabilondo Pujol (2002–2009)
- José María Sanz Martínez (2009–2017)
- Rafael Garesse Alarcon (2017–2021)
- Amaya Mendikoetxea (2021–present)

== Gallery ==
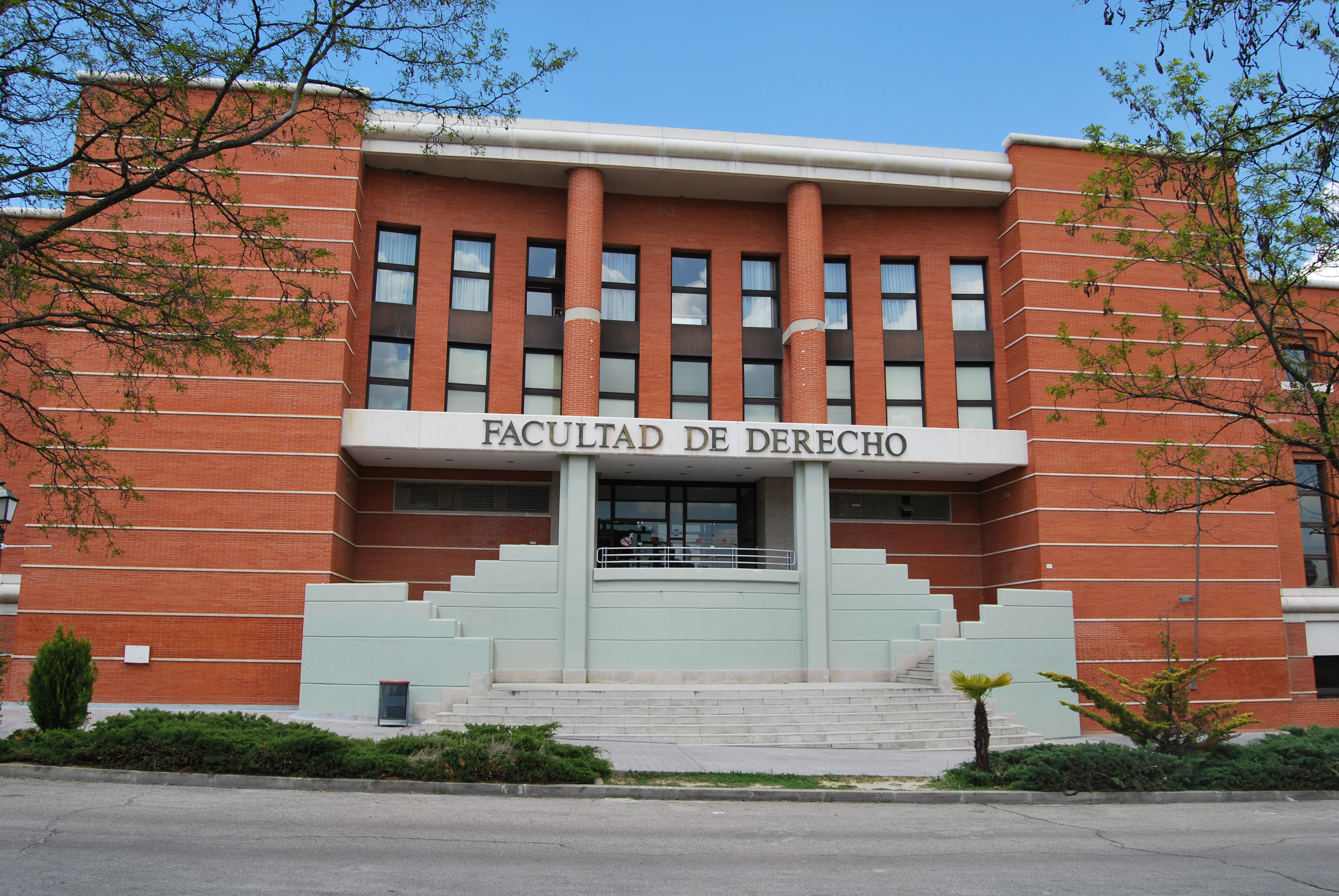
Faculty of Law

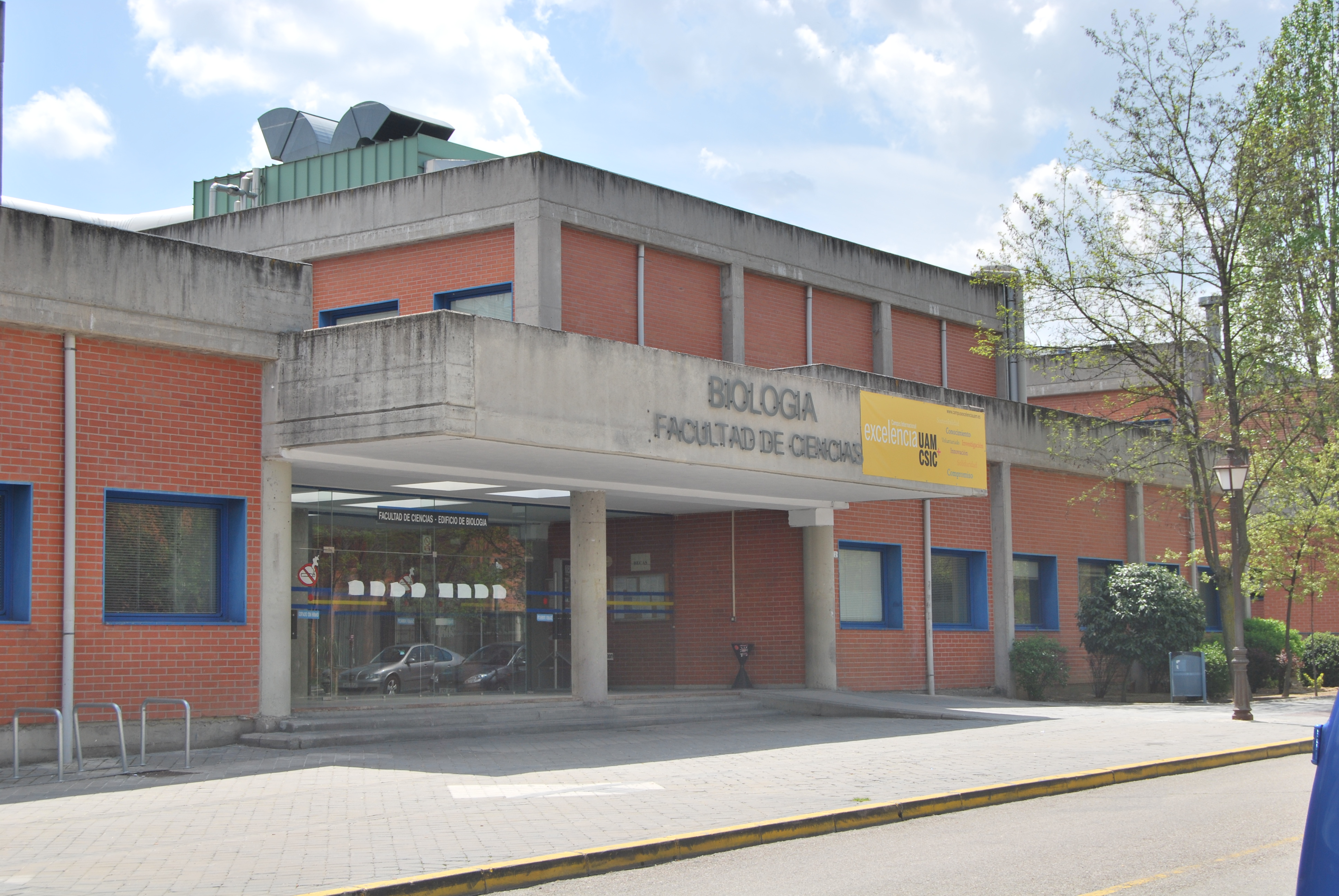
Faculty of Biology

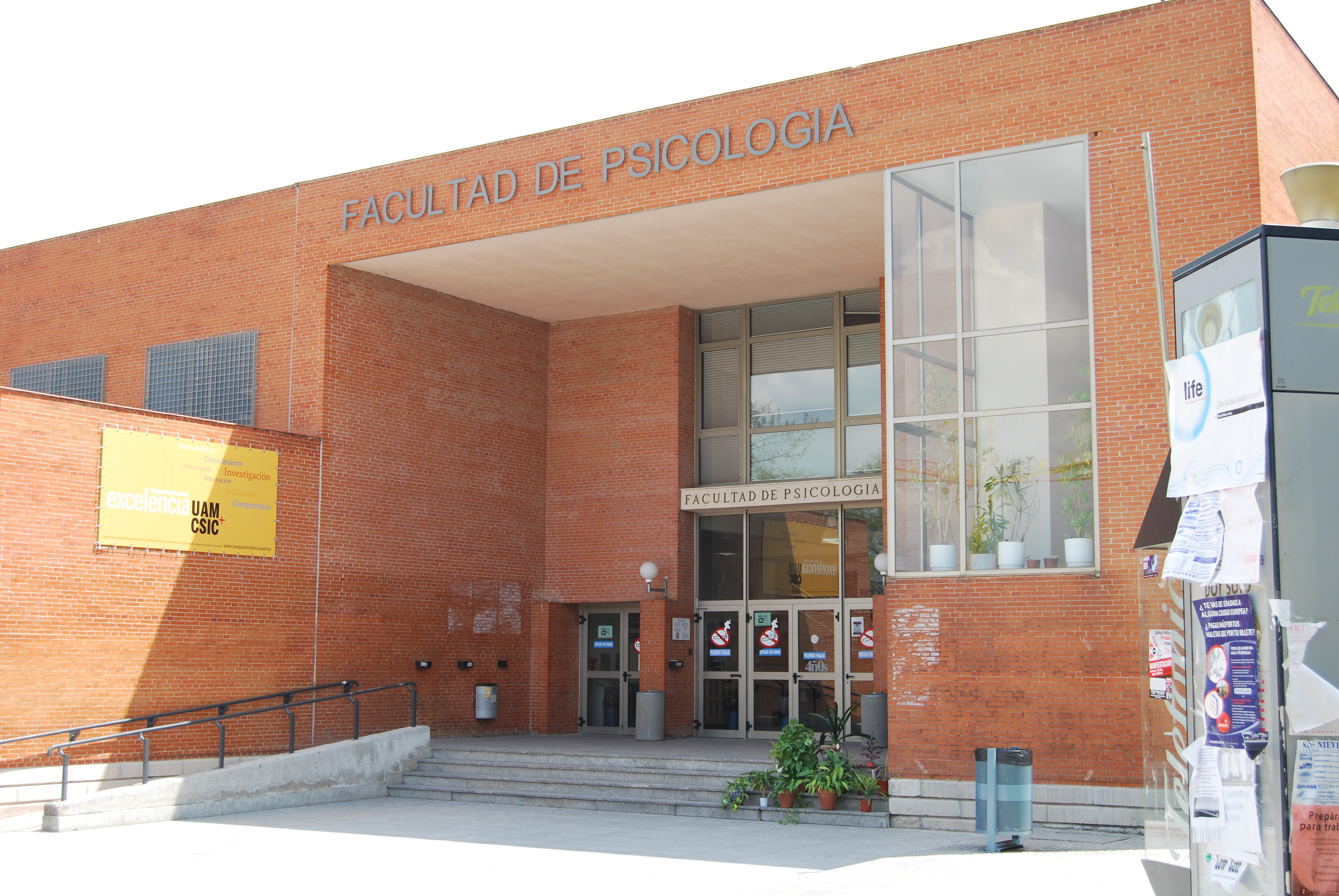
Faculty of Psychology

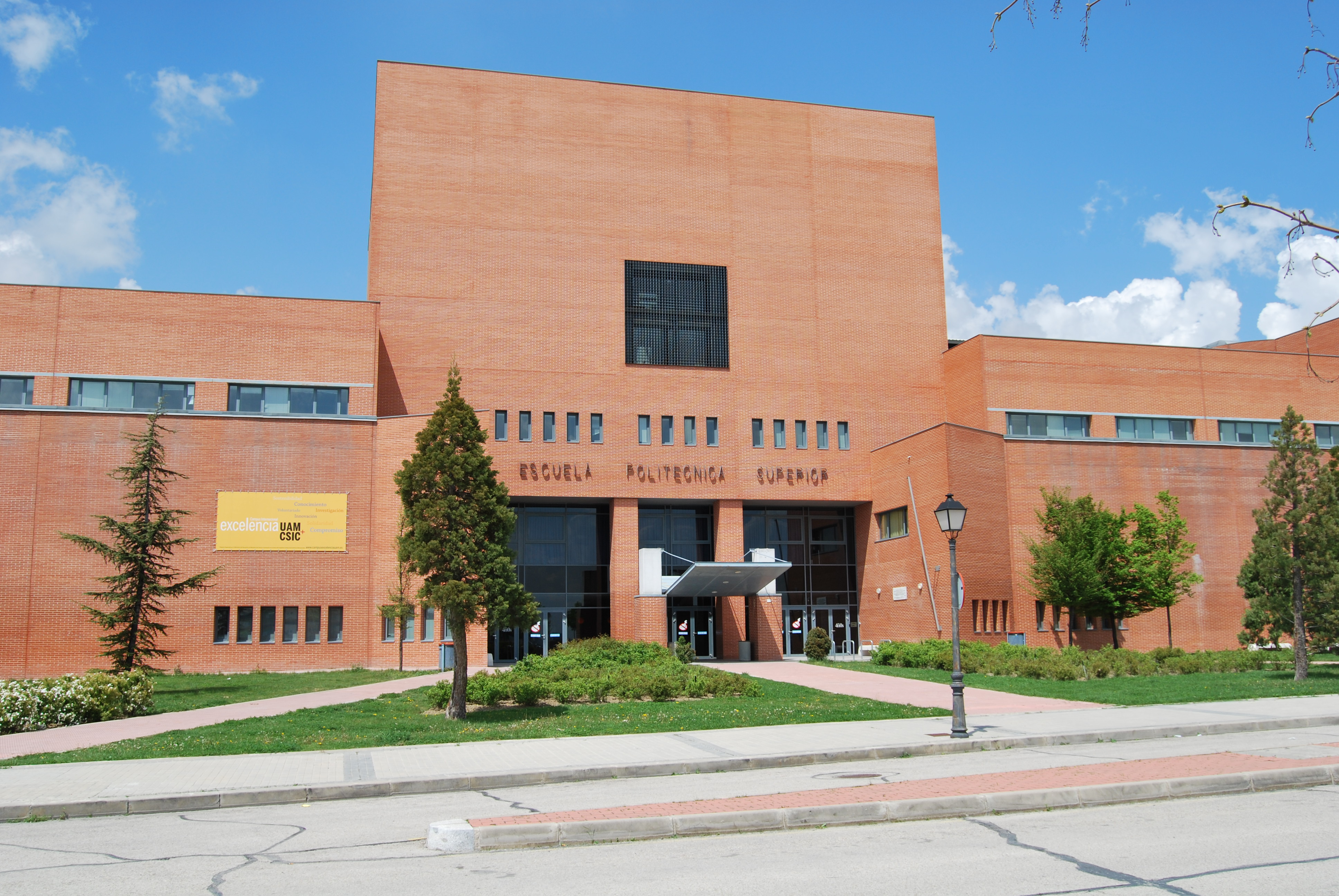
Higher School of Engineering

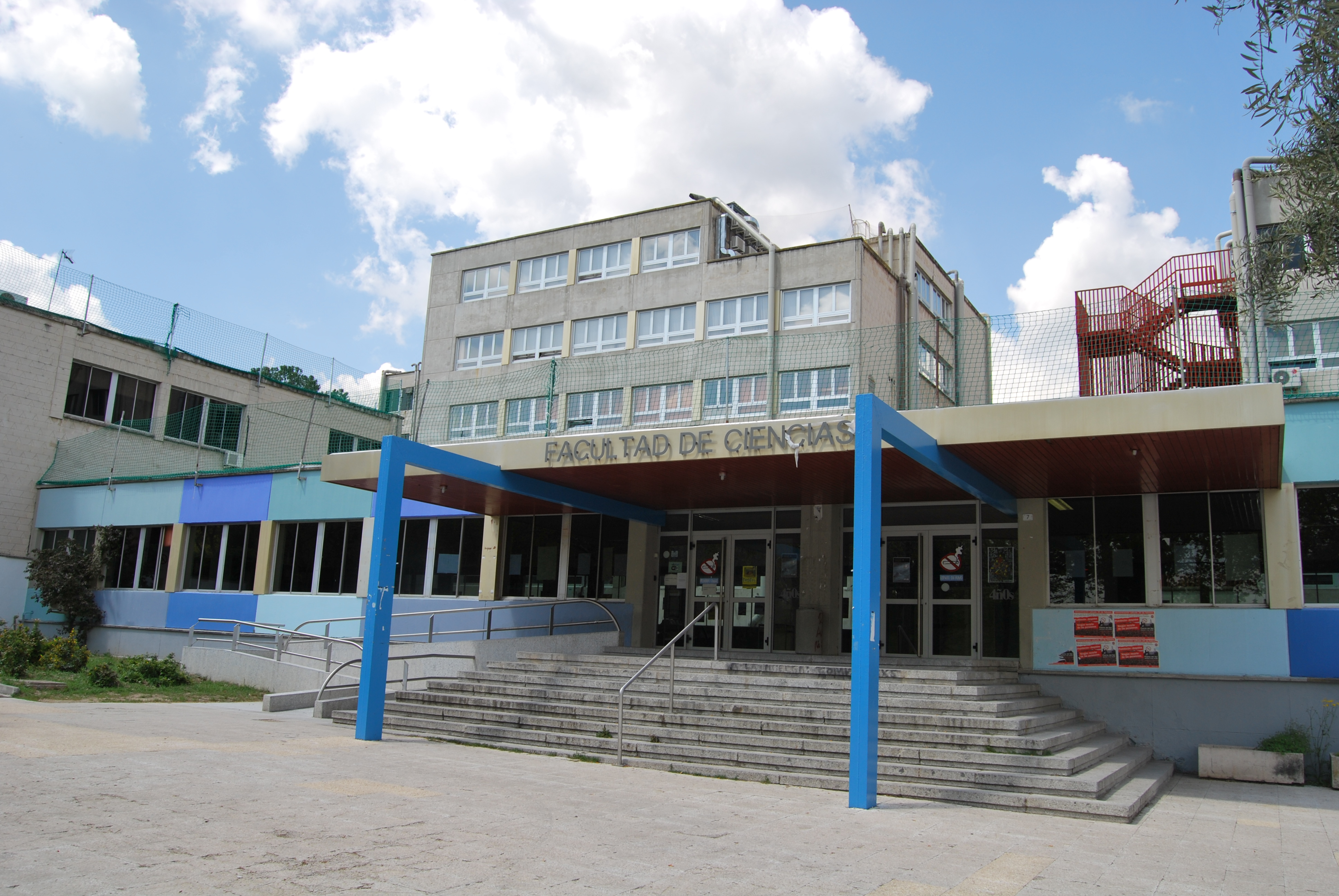
Faculty of Science

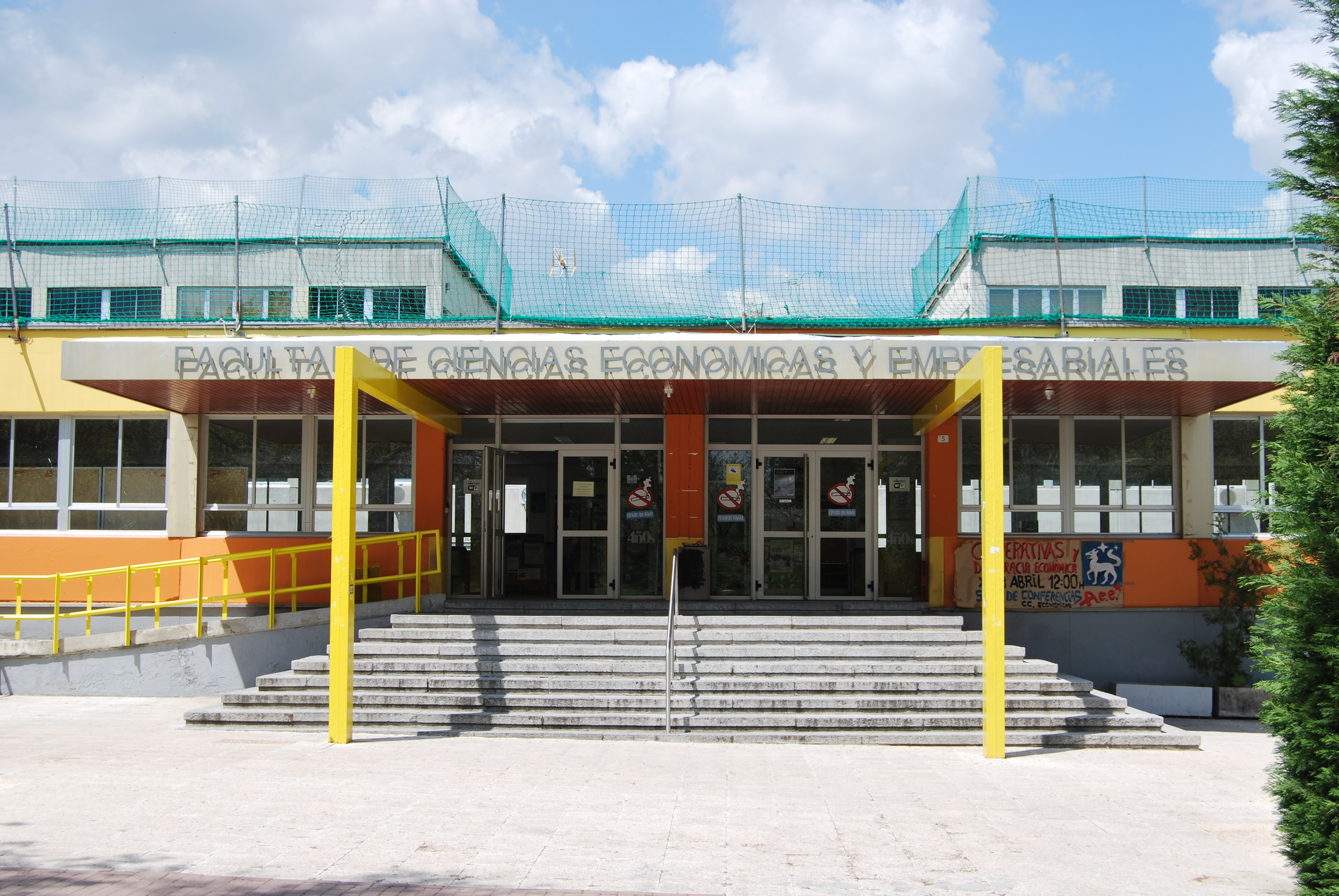
Faculty of Economics

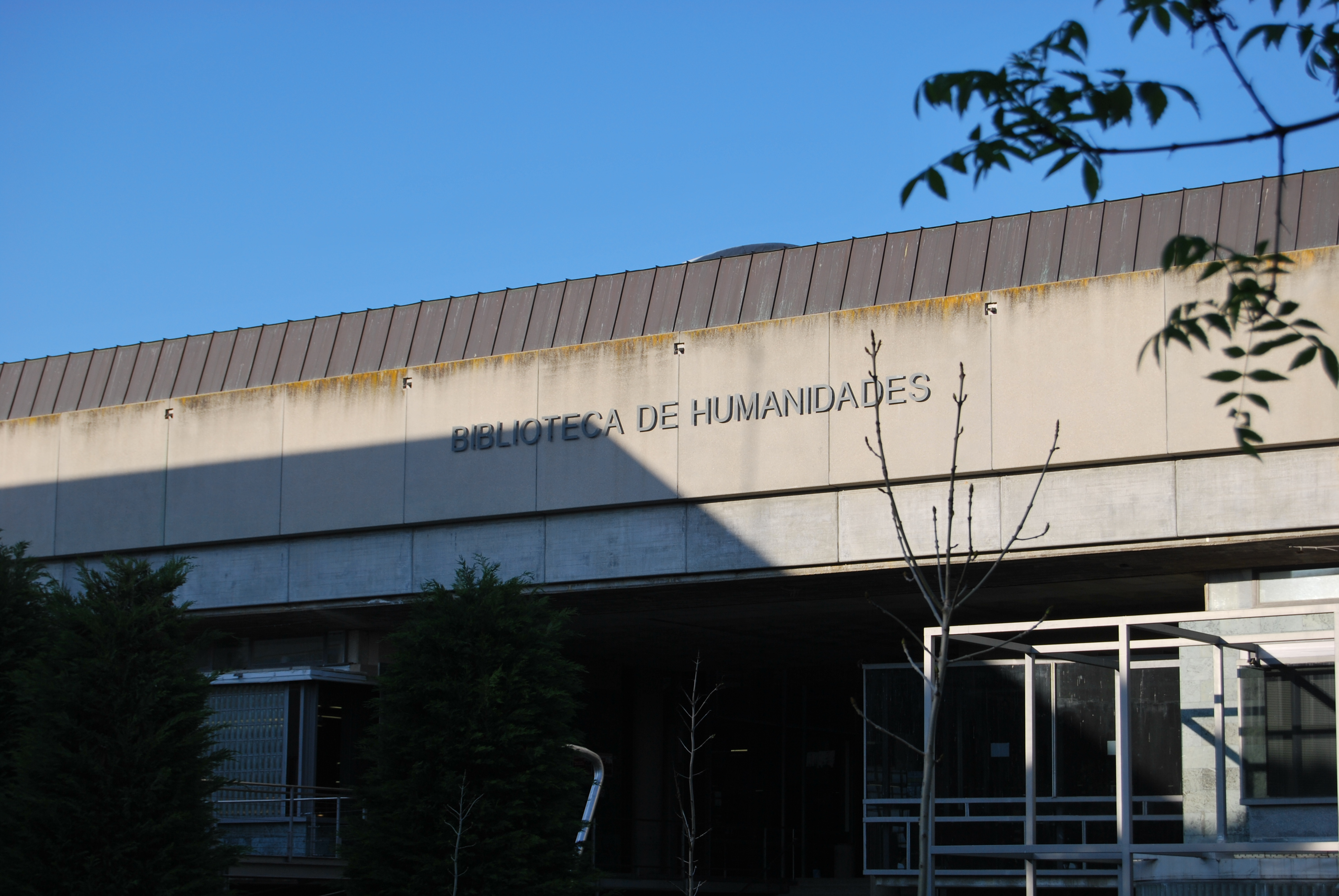
Human Sciences Library

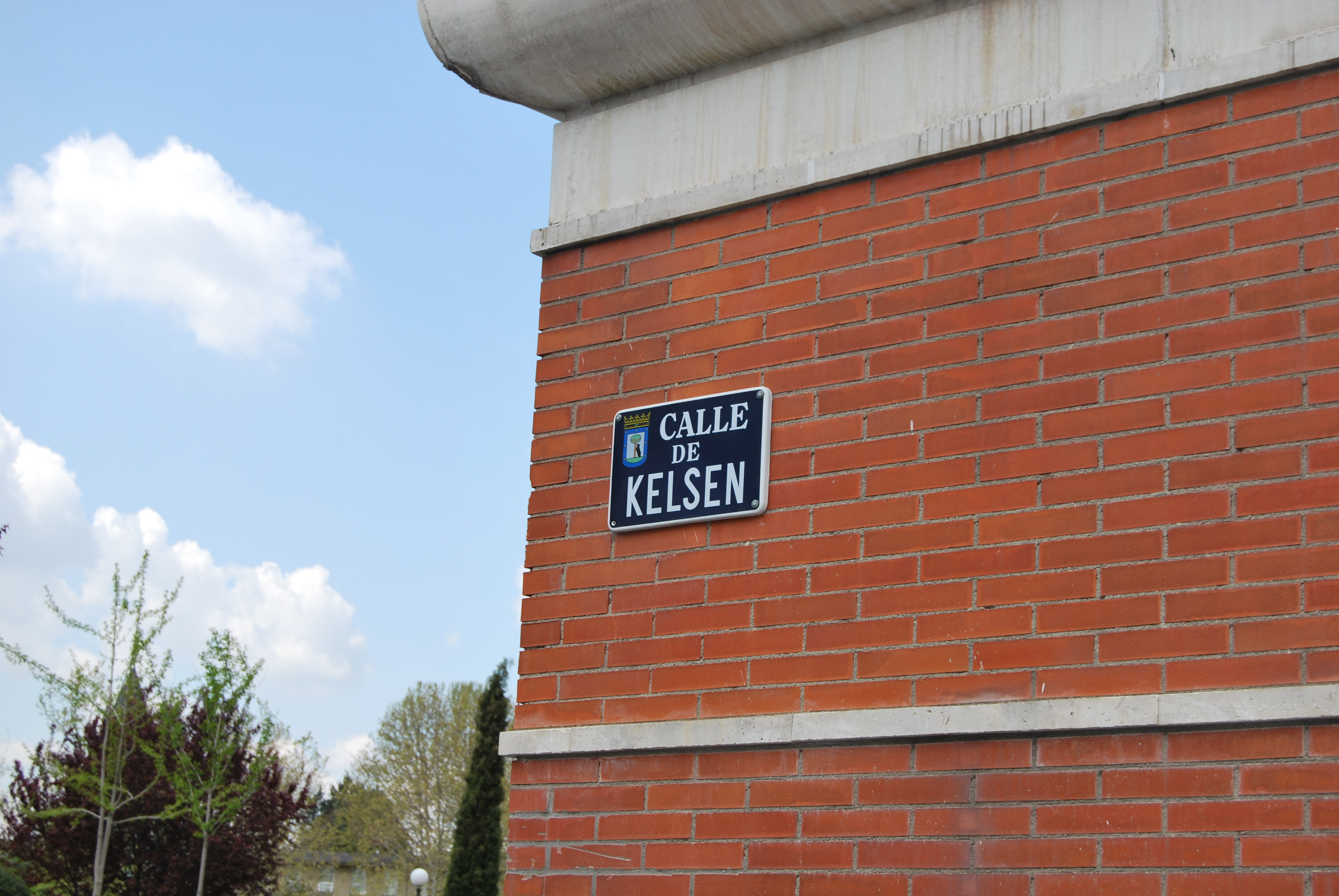
Kelsen street

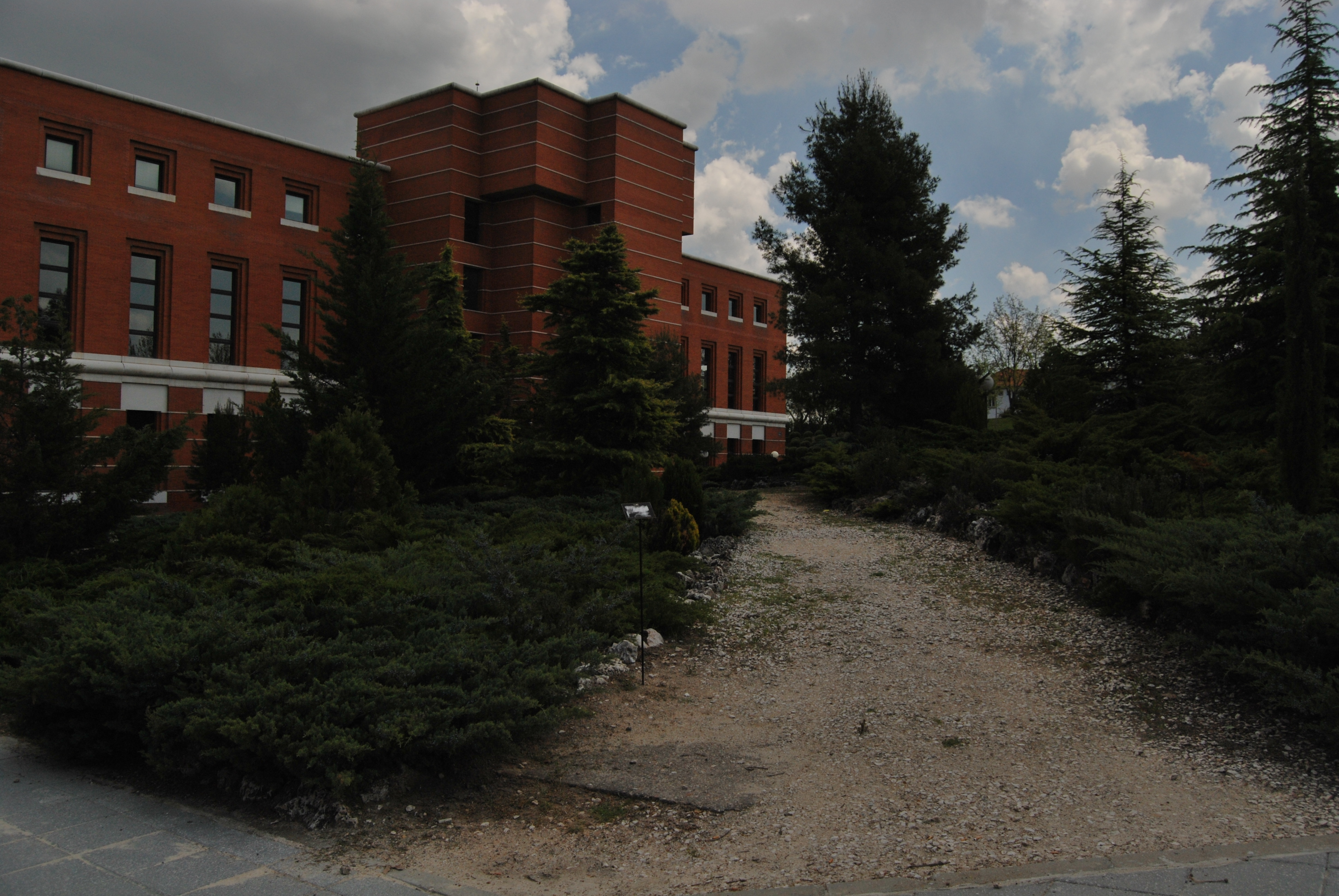
Campus

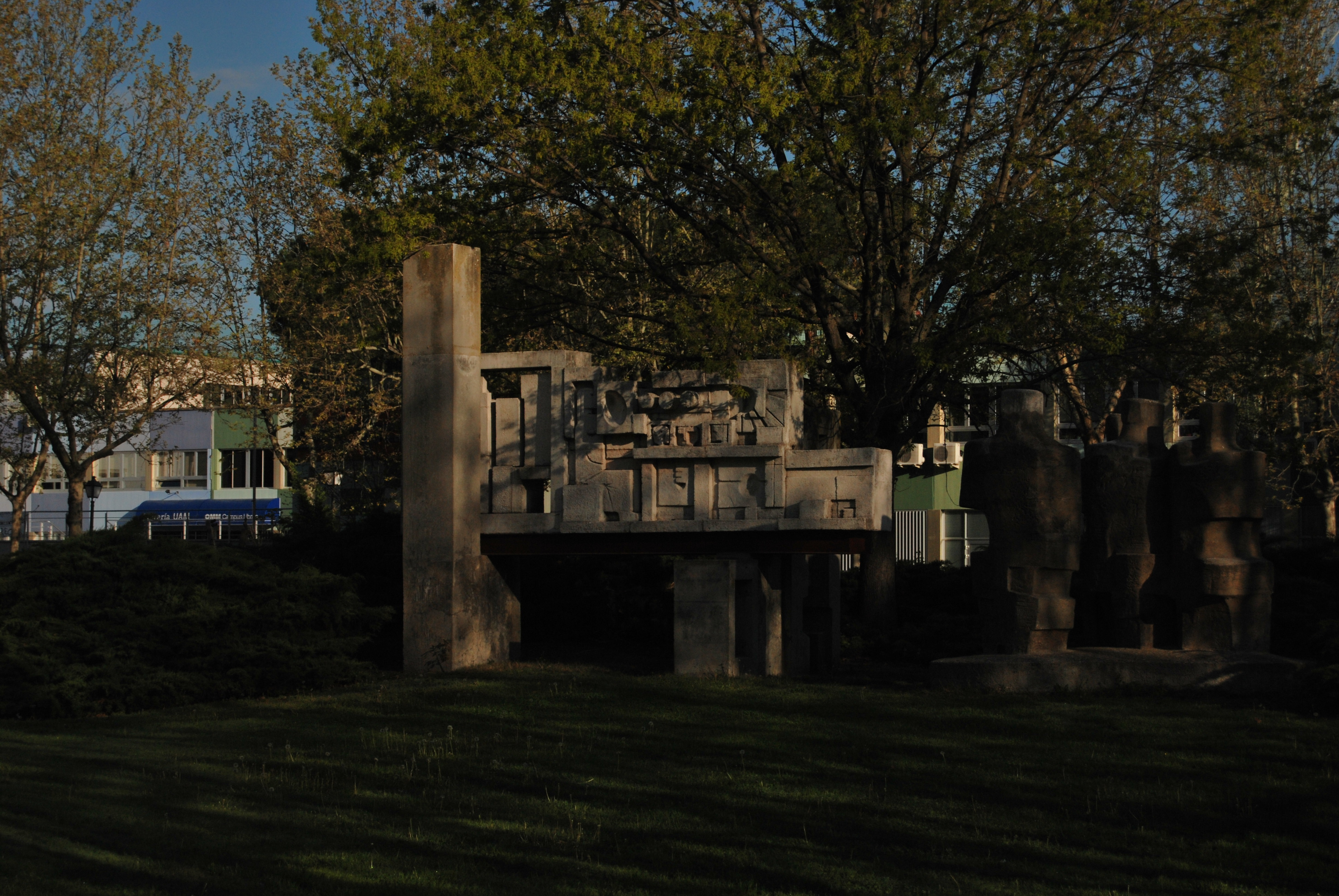
Campus

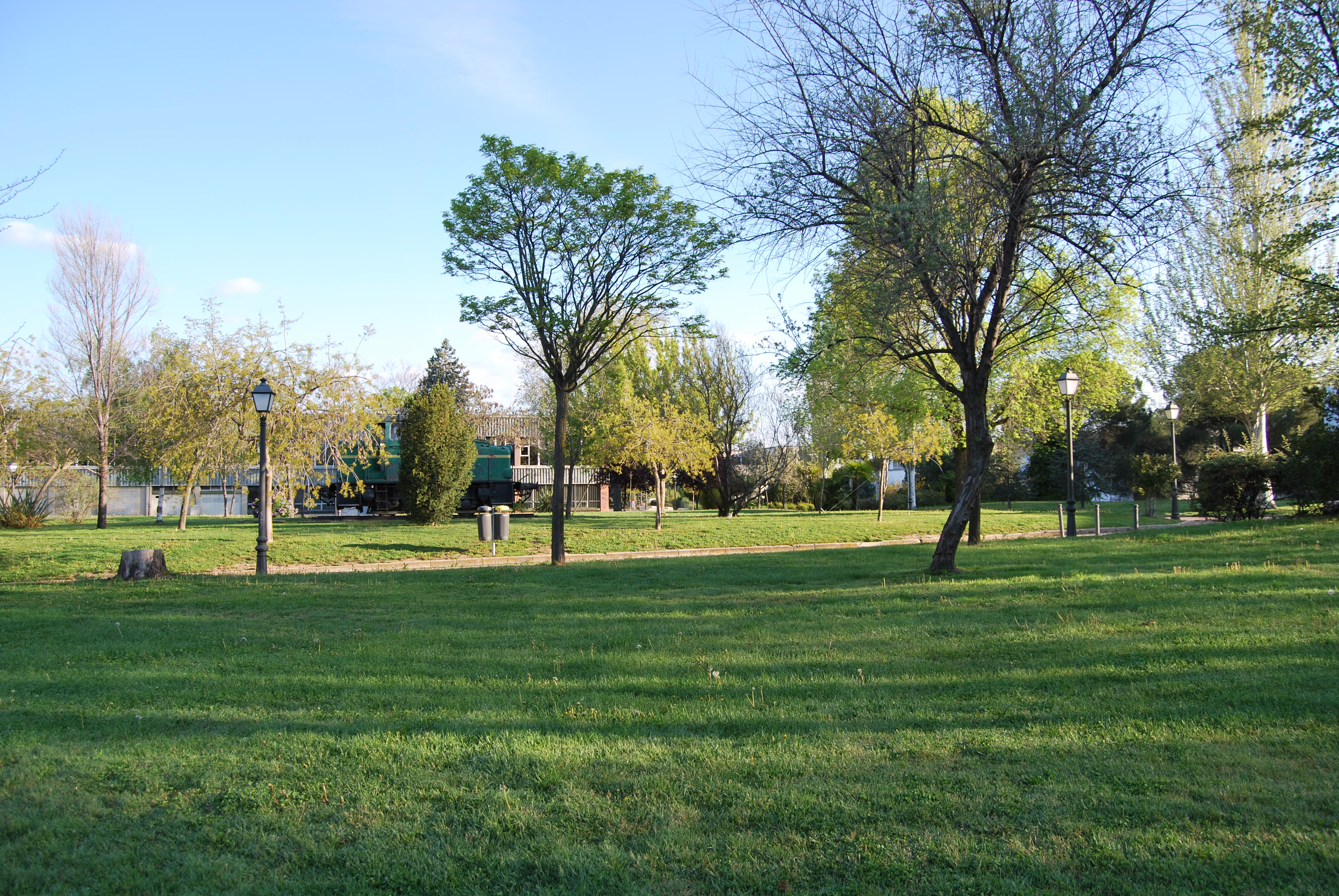
Campus

== See also ==
- List of universities in Spain
- List of forestry universities and colleges
