= Diego García-Borreguero =

Sleep researcher, restless legs expert, director of Spain's Sleep Research Institute

Diego García-Borreguero is the Director of the Sleep Research Institute in Madrid, Spain. Until 2005, he was Director of the Sleep Disorders Center at the Department of Neurology of the Fundación Jiménez Díaz at the Autonomous University of Madrid. He has completed fellowships in sleep medicine and sleep research at the National Institutes of Health in Bethesda, Maryland, USA and underwent residency training at the Max Planck Institute in Munich, Germany. He received his MD at the University of Navarra in Pamplona, Spain, and completed his PhD at LMU Munich.

García-Borreguero's main area of research is movement disorders in sleep, and restless legs syndrome (RLS) in particular. He has published extensively in this field in international peer-reviewed journals. He is also a member of numerous professional organizations related to the field of sleep science, such as the World Association of Sleep Medicine (WASM) and the American Academy of Sleep Medicine (elected fellow).

Garcia-Borreguero has published widely in the field of sleep, and particularly in RLS.
