= Beatriz Rico (neuroscientist) =

Spanish neurobiologist

Beatriz Rico is a professor of developmental neurobiology at King's College London. Her research focuses on neural circuit development.

== Early life and education ==
Beatriz was born in Madrid, Spain, where she completed her public primary and secondary education. She then attended Complutense University of Madrid to study biology, and earned her Ph.D. at the Autónoma University in Madrid under her supervisor Carmen Cavada.

Following her time in Spain, she completed her postdoctoral research at the University of California, San Francisco under her supervisor Louis Reichardt.

== Principal investigator ==
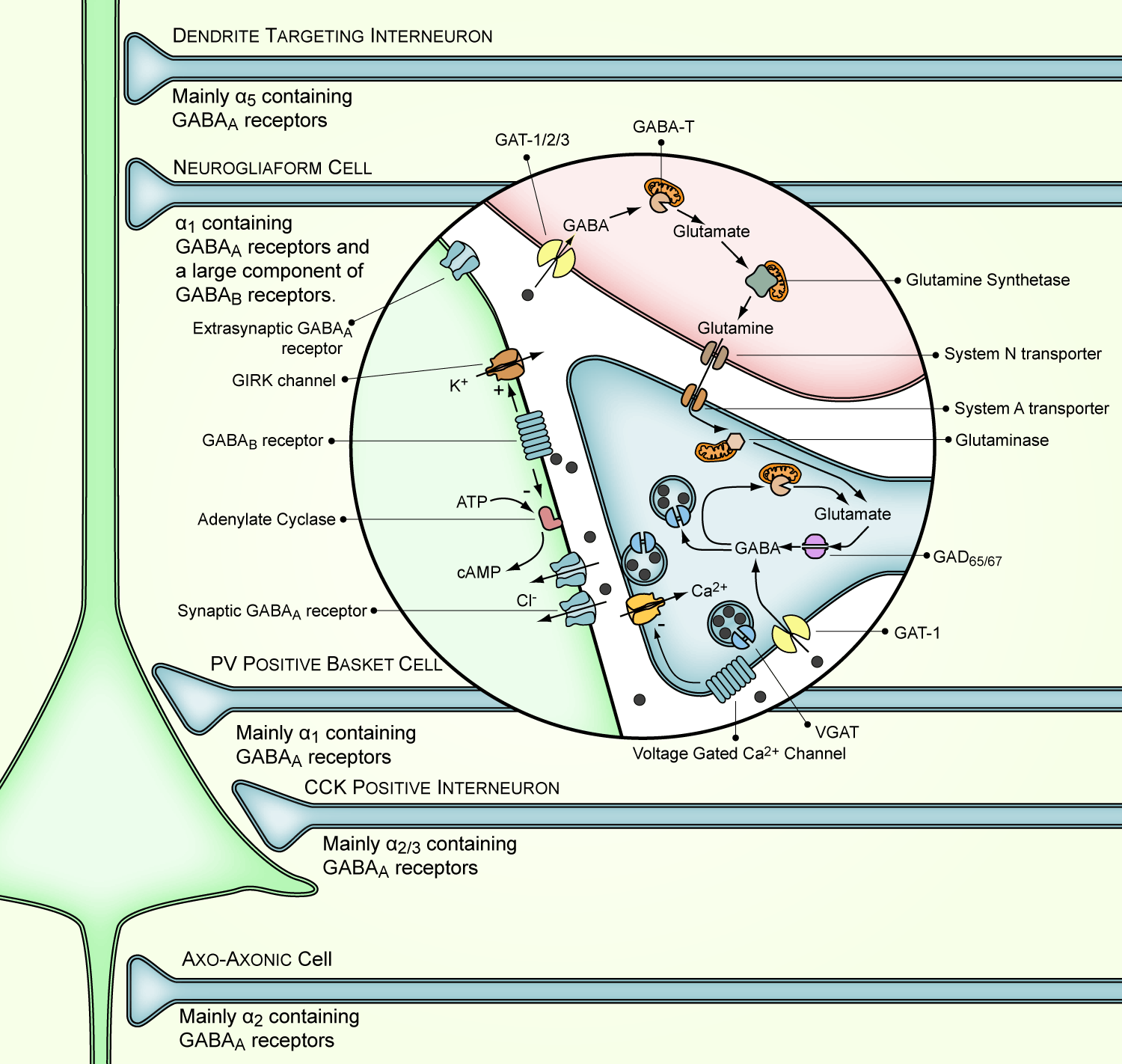
This GABAergic synapse depiction is showing the production, release, action and degradation of GABA.

Beatriz then formed her own lab focusing specifically on mammalian cortical networks and neurodevelopment disorders. Rico started as a Principal Investigator at the Neuroscience Institute in Alicante, Spain.

In 2014, Beatriz moved her lab to King's College London where she is a professor of developmental neurobiology and has continued her work on mechanisms of cortical circuit formation. In recent years, her lab has spotlighted the importance of cortical GABAergic circuitry in cognitive function and their potential role in neurological pathologies, especially schizophrenia. Her team found a discovered a link between the protein called Brevican and short-term spatial memory. According to a study conducted by them, "By modulating Brevican levels, experience introduces precise molecular and cellular modifications in PV+ cells that are required for learning and memory." In 2019, the Rico Lab uncovered a developmental mechanism for specification of inhibitory connections within the brain. Rico worked with Emilia Favuzzi and Ruben Deogracias, who were lead authors of the Science article on this discovery.

== Awards and honors ==
In 2010, Rico's work received recognition from the European Molecular Biology Organization (EMBO). Additionally, she was awarded Consolidator and Advanced grants by the European Research Council for her project 'Assembly and plasticity of inhibitory cortical networks by early learning experience'. This grant was awarded to Rico for research into how early sensory experiences affect efficiency of cortical networks and, ultimately behavior. Rico received a research grant from Wellcome, and she was granted lifelong membership to EMBO's community of scientists in 2021.
