= Esteves =

Esteves is a Portuguese family name. Esteves comes from esteva, a flower in Portuguese. It is a patronymic, meaning son of Stephen. It is equivalent to the Galician name Estévez/Esteves, which takes the form Estevez in America.

Notable people with the name include:

- Luis R. Esteves (1893–1958), founder of the Puerto Rico National Guard
- Adriana Esteves (born 1969), Brazilian actress
- Horacio Esteves (1940–1996), Venezuelan sprinter
- Ricardo Esteves (born 1979), Portuguese footballer
- Décio Esteves (1927–2000), Brazilian football player and coach
- Alfredo Esteves (born 1976), Portuguese-East Timorese footballer
- Jose Esteves (born 1947), mayor of Milpitas, California
- Imara Esteves Ribalta (born 1978), Cuban beach volleyball player
- Miguel Esteves Cardoso (born 1955), Portuguese writer, translator, critic and journalist
- Hélder Esteves (born 1977), Portuguese football striker
- Adérito Esteves (born 1985), Portuguese rugby union player
- Leonardo Esteves de Nápoles (c. 1350–1421), Portuguese nobleman and military
- Sandra María Esteves, American poet and graphic artist
- José de Jesús Esteves (1881–1918), Puerto Rican poet, lawyer, and judge
- Rui Esteves (born 1967), Portuguese football midfielder
- Sérgio Esteves (born 1968), Portuguese swimmer
- Constantino Esteves (1914–1985), Portuguese film director
- Tomás Esteves (born 2002), Portuguese footballer

== See also ==
- Estevez
