= Rafa Casette =

Spanish actor and singer

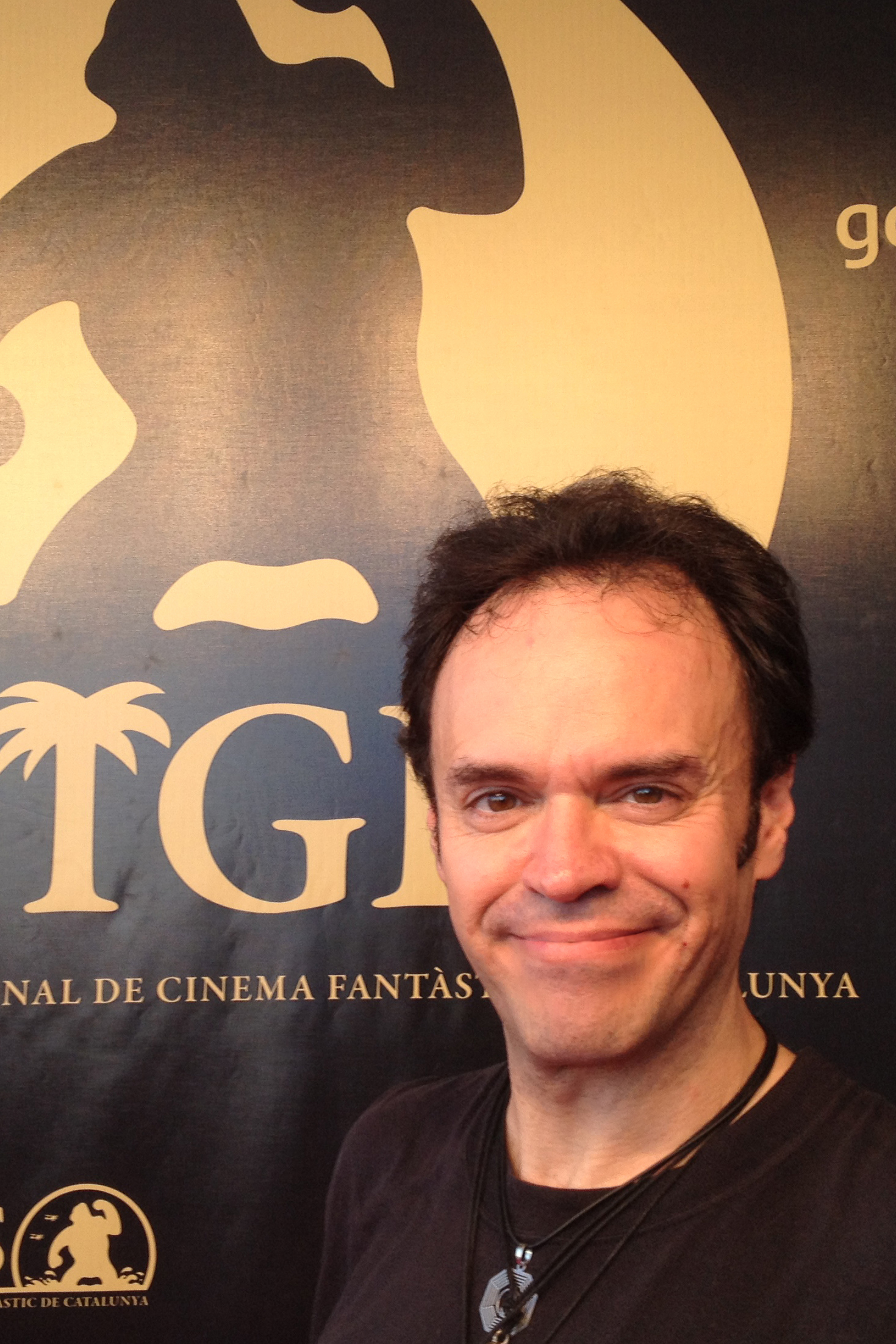
- Rafa Casette at Sitges Film Festival 2012
- Born: August 20, 1965 (age 61); Zaragoza, Spain
- Occupations: Actor and singer
- Years active: 1995–present

Rafa Casette (born August 20, 1965) is a Spanish actor and singer. His career began aged 30 in a Spanish zarzuela called La Verbena de la Paloma in 1995. After his participation in Sweeney Todd: The Demon Barber of Fleet Street by Stephen Sondheim in 2009 at the Teatro Español de Madrid, he has been involved continuously in audiovisual projects, including his first lead role in the upcoming film La mujer que hablaba con los muertos (The woman who talked to the dead) by director César del Álamo.

== Career ==
Casette began singing at a young age. After finishing high school he decided to become a lawyer and started his studies at Autonomous University of Madrid, while singing as a hobby in several amateur choirs of progressive quality, performing in international tours (France, Italy, Germany, Czechoslovakia, Switzerland, Poland). He abandoned his law studies due to financial difficulties and over the years he worked as a burger cook, insurance salesman, Internet webmaster, telemarketer, electronic music composer, CGI designer, and comics illustrator.

He made his acting debut in 1995 in the Spanish zarzuela called La Verbena de la Paloma (The Fair of the Dove), filling in for a choir member at the Teatro Calderón de Madrid company of director José Luis Moreno. He first appeared as a chorus singer and support actor, with roles of increasing importance owing to the support of director José Tamayo and his acclaimed international show Antología de la Zarzuela and other zarzuela Spanish directors. In the following years he studied Music and Acting at several public and private schools.

In 2008, he was selected from a cast of 1,200 to play Sweeney Todd: The Demon Barber of Fleet Street, the musical thriller by Stephen Sondheim in 2009 at Teatro Español de Madrid. Taking advantage of free time between rehearsals and plays, he shot his first homemade videobook and enrolled in several talent agencies, starting a continuous audiovisual career; it includes a wide variety of short movies, TV series, international TV commercials, radio broadcast acting and host, and his first lead role in the upcoming film La mujer que hablaba con los muertos (The woman who talked to the dead) by director César del Álamo, which will be released in May 2014 at Nocturna, Madrid International Fantastic Film Festival.

== Nominations ==
- Premios Max (2013) — Best Supporting Actor for Pocahontas, El Musical

== Filmography ==
Film roles
Year	Title	Role	Notes
2009	Tarifa 3 (Third Fare)	Pelayo	Short. ESCAC – Escola Superior de Cinema i Audiovisuals de Catalunya (Catalonia Film and Media Arts School). Filmed in Barcelona during the Sweeney Todd tour
2010	Sofía	Survivor	Short
2010	Cambio de sentido (Changing Direction)	Doctor	Feature film
2010	El visitante (The visitor)	The Smoking Man	Short
2010	Pepita Montes	Journalist	Short
2011	Los Hombres Caballo (The Horse Men)	Fruit Seller	Short. Notodofilmfest online festival
2011	In Extremis	Juanjo	Short. ECAM – Escuela de Cinematografía y del Audiovisual de la Comunidad de Madrid (Madrid Film and Media Arts School)
2011	Amor Sacro (Sacred Love)	Priest	Short. Released at 44 Sitges Film Festival
2012	Estrellita (Little Star)	Homeless	Short. Notodofilmfest online festival
2012	Tus gritos me dan risa (Your screams make me laugh)	Alejandro	Short. Released at 45 Sitges Film Festival
2013	Última Transmisión (Last Transmission)	Eduardo	Notodofilmfest online festival. There is an extended version Última Transmisión 2.0 (Director's cut) released in theatres
2013	Funcionarios (Civil Servants)	Paco	Notodofilmfest online festival. In 2014 will be released its web series version
2013	María & Marta	Deformed Man	Notodofilmfest online festival. Prosthetic makeup by David Ambit (Spanish [REC] series)
2013	El día del padre		Feature film.
2013	#Sequence	Paco	Feature film. Collective work coordinated by Montxo Armendariz. Prosthetic makeup by David Ambit
2014	Vigilantes	Paco	Notodofilmfest online festival. Prosthetic makeup by David Ambit
2014	La mujer que hablaba con los muertos (The woman who talked to the dead)	Carlos	Feature film. Release in May 2014 at Nocturna, Madrid International Fantastic Film Festival

== Television ==
TV roles
Year	Title	Role	Notes
1996	Katiuska	Farmer	Theatre play recording TV released
1996	El Barberillo de Lavapiés (Little Barber from Lavapiés)	Man	Theatre play recording TV released
2009	Doctor Mateo	Postman	
2009	Sin tetas no hay paraíso (Without Tits There Is No Paradise)	Invitado	
2010	Supercharly	Transeunte	
2010	Cuarto milenio – Operación 23 (Operation 23)	Paco Padrón	
2011	Cuarto milenio – La casa Hinsdale (Hinsdale House)	Alex the Medium	
2011	Los Quién (The Whos)	Editor	
2011	Cuarto milenio – El monstruo de Florencia (Monster of Florence)	Monster	
2011	Hoy quiero confesar (Today I Want To Confess)	Paquirri's Assistant	
2011	Cuarto milenio – La muerte de Carolina (The Death of Carolina)	Antonio Romero	
2013	Gran Hotel (Great Hotel)	Executioner	
2013	Poli&Cía (Cops)	Soto	TV pilot
2013	Cosas de Sofá (Smart Sofa)	Fernando	TV pilot
2013	Cuarto milenio – Hospital Adentro (Hospital Indoors)	Doctor	

== Theatre ==
Zarzuela being his main activity, Casette has worked throughout Spain over the past eighteen years with many lyric companies including the Teatro de la Zarzuela National Company and the Royal Theatre National Company and he has been involved in the main theater seasons on the Iberian Peninsula. He has a repertoire of over fifty zarzuelas, opera and operetta. He has also participated in the following plays:

Theatre roles
Year	Title	Role	Notes and awards
1998–1999	El gran teatro del mundo (The Great Theatre of the World)	Choir	
2008–2009	Sweeney Todd: The Demon Barber of Fleet Street	Choir	Eleven Gran Vía Musical Theatre Awards in 2009, including Best Public Musical and Best Theatre Director for Mario Gas
2009–2010	Mónica Naranjo Adagio Tour	Choir	
2010	Qué más quisiera yo (If only I could)	Nando	
2010	Antología de Musicales (Musical Theatre Anthology)	Monsieur Thénardier	
2011–2012	Pocahontas, el musical (Pocahontas the Musical)	Christopher Newport	Nominated – Premios Max Award for Best Supporting Actor
2012	La venganza de la Petra (Revenge of Petra)	Tufitos / Jesús	
2013	Villanueva	Puritos	
2013	Viceversa	Job interviewer	Microtheatre
