= Antonio M. Echavarren =

Spanish chemist

Antonio M. Echavarren Pablos (born 1955) is a Spanish chemist who has contributed to the recent advances in gold and palladium chemistry.

He obtained his PhD at the Universidad Autonoma de Madrid in 1982. Since 1992 he is a full professor at Universidad Autonoma de Madrid, where he heads the Research Group on Organometallic Chemistry Directed Towards Organic Synthesis. Since 2004 he is working as Group Leader at the Institute of Chemical Research of Catalonia (ICIQ).
