= Wilfrid Esteve =

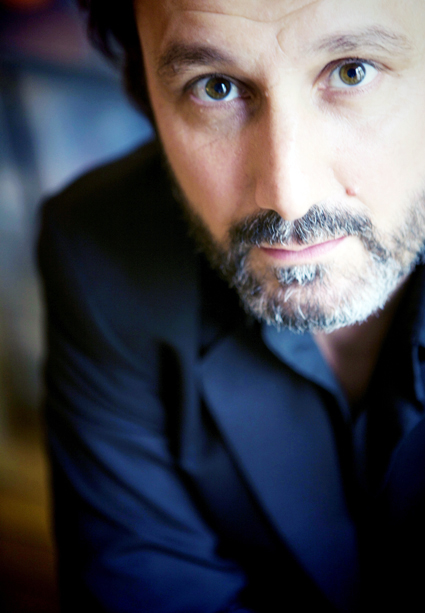
Wilfrid Esteve

Wilfrid Estève (born Carcassonne, France in 1968) is a French photojournalist and portraitist. Since 1995, his work has appeared in publications including ELLE, Libération, Le Monde, Geo France, Marie-Claire, National Geographic France, Paris Match and VSD, and was awarded a "special mention" award in the 2005 Prix Nadar competition, along with other co-authors, for his work 'Photojournalism at the crossroads'.

Based on a philosophy of bearing witness and of inquiry, his photographic work concentrates on conflict zones and areas of breaking news, in (West Africa, Europe, and the Middle East). He is simultaneously pursuing a project of documenting immigration in France.

In 2005, he developed and directed a multidisciplinary project "Territories of fiction". In 2006 he co-founded the Hans Lucas audiovisual studio.

In 2008, he became co-director of the photo agency MYOP, and also participated in the creation of Photojournalism.fr, dedicated to news photography and photojournalism.

== MYOP ==
Since June 2008, Wilfrid Estève has shared the management of MYOP with Guillaume Binet and Lionel Charrier. The photo agency was created in 2005 and consists of 12 independent photographers. Its originality lies in its ability to show diverse points of view.

The members of the agency come from various backgrounds, including conceptual photography, photojournalism and documentary. Anchored in the political photography of the newspaper Libération, where most of the members of the agency do freelance work, the photographers of MYOP have done assignments for the most famous French and international newspapers such as Le Monde and magazines such as Elle, Géo, Marie Claire, National Geographic, Newsweek, Paris Match and The Times.

MYOP photographers have received awards for their work, including the W. Eugene Smith grant (Alain Keler in 1997), the Agena best humanitarian reportage prize (Alexis Cordesse in 1992), the Bourse 3P de Yann Arthus Bertrand (Alain Keler in 2004), two Bourses FIACR (Oan Kim in 2008), the Prix Nadar (Wilfrid Estève in 2005), the Paris Match prize (Alain Keler in 1986), World Press Photo (Alain Keler in the nature section, 1986), World Press Photo Joop Swart Masterclass (Alexis Cordesse in 1993), third prize Observer Hodge Award (Alexis Cordesse in 1995), Prix des Voies Off des rencontres photographiques d'Arles (Wilfrid Estève in 2000).

M.Y.O.P stands for "Mind Your Own Photography" (although it has also been said to mean "Mes Yeux Objets Patients" ("my eyes are patient objects"), a reference to Paul Eluard. Esteve left M.Y.O.P. in 2010 after a disagreement on the organization's goals and development with the other members.

== Freelens-France ==
Since 2004, Wilfrid Estève has led Freelens-France, formerly known as The National Association of FreeLens Journalist Reporters, Photographers and Filmmakers.

Freelens-France's objective is to assert the role and importance of photography in democratic debate. Founded in 1962, in the last five decades it has brought together some of the major figures of photojournalism, such as Henri Cartier-Bresson, Raymond Depardon, Gisèle Freund, Marc Riboud, and Sebastião Salgado. In earlier years, the organization was led by Robert Doisneau, Roger Pic, Patrick Bard and Lorenzo Virgili. In July 2008, FreeLens-France launched the website Photojournalisme.fr, dedicated to news photography and photojournalists.

== Teaching ==
Since 1996, Wilfrid Estève has taught photojournalism at several well-known schools (l'École supérieure de journalisme de Lille), and specialized training centers (CFPJ or l'École des Métiers de l'Information, in Paris) as well as conducting workshops at festivals.

In 2006, he became the educational director of the photographic division of l'École des Métiers de l'Information.

In 2007, he put together the Prix Tremplin Photo, a scholarship awarded during the festival "Visa pour l'image" and dedicated to photojournalism.

A qualifying course in photojournalism, which Esteve co-manages with Mat Jacob of the collective Tendance floue and Lorenzo Virgili, counts among its former students the 2008 recipient of the prix Mark Grosset (Elisabeth Schneider), the 2007 recipient of the award Visa d'or Magazin au Festival International du Photojournalism Visa pour l'image and the Festival du scoop et du journalism d'Angers' Prix Special du Jury (Lizzie Sadin), the recipients in 2002 and 2004 of the Prix Kodak de la critique (Julien Daniel and Jérômine Derigny), the 2005 recipient of the grand Prix Calderon (Jérôme Sessini) of the festival du Scoop et du journalisme d'Angers, two recipients of the 3P scholarship (Lizzie Sadin and Frederique Jouval), the 2003 recipient of the grand Prix International du Reportage Humanitaire CARE (Florence Gaty), the recipient of the Prix Fnac Attention Talents 2002 and the Prix Fuji 2002 (Julien Daniel) and two recipients of the World Press Photo (Julien Daniel).

== Territories of fiction ==
In 2005, Wilfrid Estève launched the multimedia project "Territories of fiction," with Virginie Terrasse and Benjamin Boccas acting as artistic editors. The resulting exhibition, which included photography and video, examined France through the work of one hundred artists, 13 sound designers, 2 graphic designers, 28 filmmakers and 57 photographers. The project developed a concept called POM, Petite Oeuvre Multimédia (Small Works of Multimedia).

"Territories of fiction" toured France, Belgium, Italy and Poland, and has had approximately one million visitors since 2006. The project made its 2006 debut at the Galerie du Château d'eau, as well as on the walls of the Toulouse subway (usually dedicated to advertisements).

Marta Eloy Cichocka, journalist and university professor, writes of "Territories of fiction": "[In] this bridge between information and art...the artists confront social frustration, the lack of confidence in politics and democracy, the revival of radical political parties, as well as problems linked to immigration and integration".

== Oeil Public ==
In 1995, Esteve was a co-founder of the photo agency Oeil Public ('The Public Eye') which he left in 2004. The agency closed its doors in 2009.

The agency won many prestigious photography awards (including the World Press Photo and Prix Kodak de la critique) and contributed to renowned international publications.

According to Michel Guerrin, "Oeil Public takes its rightful place as a descendant of the Magnum agency...for its independence and aesthetic, but also of the Viva agency, a superb team of rabble-rousers created in the aftermath of May 68..."

== Quotes ==
"For the past ten years the photographic world has been destabilized. New technologies have redefined the performance of our profession. Major changes have taken places in the fields of production, distribution and consumption. A new electronic economy has emerged. It upsets our ways of thinking, of working, of seeing the world, without having given us time to prepare for it. Now that photography has become a consumer good, it is necessary to act. Are we to encourage the bulimic consumption of information in an atmosphere of urgency? Should we be satisfied with feeding those illusion making machines, the stock agencies, and thus submerge and intoxicate the public with photographs? Doesn't the current approach to news lead us to a condition of "junk media"? In this market of over-consumption, it is necessary to take a step back, to analyze, and not to lose the thread of our history. Try not to focus on the events while forgetting the profound conditions that created them. Try to understand the way in which the public builds its vision of the world. Fight against the rise of ignorance, of intolerance and the fear of the other. Fear kills the spirit. The curiosity that comes with taking a picture is a necessary bridge to other cultures. Let us prevent the reader from being swallowed by the sensational and the author from turning into a voyeur. The media imposes its reality on us, and those responsible are assuring us an 'information spectacle'. Contemporary photography is at a crossroads. Preceding generations were focused around a journalistic approach based on eyewitness reports. Where does it stand today? It is unusual in France that a young photographer claims to be a photojournalist, that he develops a point of view, a relevant angle. However, trying to erase any trace of a political viewpoint from reporting contradicts its very meaning. It disinherits the dream and the revolt. By entering into history, photography loses its desire to reshape the world. We do not have the desire to mold a culture of consensus. Today, we no longer know how to show, we don't even know how to see. The threat lies in the fact that financial results take the place of testimony and emotion. And that the mandate of a subculture replaces a unified world vision. Let's not forget that to exclude, also means to be deprived of the vision of the other, and that the way through which we inform and get information, is a major aspect of democracy."

Wilfrid Estève during the conference "Is photojournalism a political action?" organized in 2005 by Visa pour l'image.

== Decorations ==
- Chevalier of the Order of Arts and Letters (2015)
