= João Rodrigues Esteves =

Portuguese composer

João Rodrigues Esteves (c. 1699 – on or shortly after 1 November 1755) was a Portuguese composer of religious music. The skill and quality of his music made him one of the greatest baroque musicians in Portugal.

His surviving works number close to 100. His manuscripts are all housed in Portuguese libraries, mostly in the Lisbon Cathedral archive. He is first mentioned in 1719 when he was brought to Rome under King João V in order to study with composer Giuseppe Ottavio Pitoni. By 1726 he was back in Portugal. In 1729 he became a master of music in the Basilica de Santa Maria Maior, the Lisbon Cathedral.

The exact date of his death is not known but it is assumed that he died in the great Lisbon Earthquake, or of injuries immediately afterward.

He wrote numerous works, among others:

- Eight-voice mass completed at Rome on 8 September 1721
- 22 vesper psalms
- 2 Te Deum
- Magnificat in E minor with organ
