= Antoni Esteve Subirana =

Catalan pharmacist

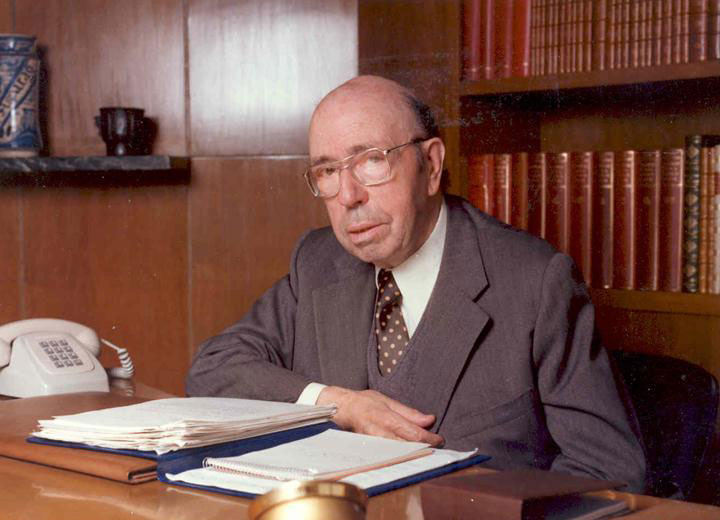
Antoni Esteve Subirana

Antoni Esteve i Subirana (1902, Manresa – 1979, Barcelona) was a Catalan pharmacist who was the first in Spain to produce vitamins and sulfonamides. Like his father (Josep Esteve i Seguí), Antoni became involved in his country's social, cultural, and political life, although he never agreed to serve in public office.

He presided over various scientific societies in Catalonia and the Balearic Islands and was a member of the Scientific Section of the Institute of Catalan Studies. He published over 60 papers (articles and monographs), which were outstanding for their level of detail and thorough bibliographic documentation.

== Early life ==
Antoni Esteve i Subirana was the fifth in a long lineage of pharmacists beginning in 1787 with Tomàs Esteve i Gabanyach at the "Plana de l'Om" (Manresa) pharmacy, where the seventh generation of pharmacists in the Esteve family continues to work today. Antoni Esteve was awarded an honors degree in pharmacy from the University of Barcelona in 1924 and started his doctoral studies in Madrid the following year. His plans to write his thesis in chemistry in Barcelona were interrupted by the unexpected death of his father in 1927, and he was obliged to make the family pharmacy in Manresa his first priority. In his memoirs, he wrote: "I couldn't leave the pharmacy and clinical analyses that enabled me to earn a living, nor could I abandon my mother. Thus, the first step was to maintain the prestige that my father had brought to the 'Plana de l'Om' pharmacy."

The small clinical analysis laboratory that had been installed in the apartment above the pharmacy a few years earlier would soon be used to develop original drug preparations. The first of these was vitamin D obtained by irradiation, which was registered under the trademark Esterosol. As developing original drug preparations came to make up a growing part of his professional activity, in 1931 Antoni Esteve founded what was to become one of the most important Catalan pharmaceutical companies: Esteve Laboratories.

In parallel, Antoni Esteve invested heavily in the push to attain organic arsenic compounds for the treatment of syphilis (marketed in 1934 as Neo-Spirol). Given the high mortality caused by syphilis at the time, Neo-Spirol is considered one of the company's greatest achievements.

== Exile ==
During the Spanish Civil War, Antoni Esteve carried on working at the pharmacy in Manresa, and his laboratory was key in providing sulfonamides to treat infections, as it became more and more difficult to import these drugs from Germany. As he explained: "Our production was always sufficient, despite the difficulties in obtaining the raw materials."

When Catalonia was definitively occupied by Franco's Nationalist army, Antoni Esteve went into exile in France, where he associated with prominent figures in the pharmaceutical industry and worked in a prestigious laboratory. A short time later, the Second World War broke out and the advance of German troops across France forced him to return to Barcelona, where he was put on trial for political responsibilities and sentenced to pay a fine. Forcibly removed from all political and cultural activity, Antoni Esteve threw himself into his scientific work. In his Memoirs, he wrote: "During the year and a half when I was in France, my family was constantly harassed and suffered all sorts of attacks from many of the new authorities installed in Manresa".

== The laboratory in Barcelona ==
After returning from exile, the laboratory was moved to Barcelona, starting a new chapter in the history of the company marked not only by progressive expansion, but also by the introduction of original drug preparations into the market. In 1944, the laboratory was the first in Spain to obtain penicillin, and Alexander Fleming, who won the Nobel prize for penicillin, visited Esteve Laboratories in 1948. In 1952, the manufacture of a new antihemorrhagic agent enabled the company to expand internationally, an exceptional accomplishment for a Catalan company during the early years of the dictatorship.

All of these achievements resulted from the extensive research in chemistry and pharmacology carried out under the personal direction of Dr. Antoni Esteve, who was able to build a team of excellent biomedical scientists, including Antoni Oriol i Anguera, Josep Laporte i Salas, F. Regné de Otal, and his own son Josep Esteve i Soler.

In 1965, Antoni Esteve, convinced of the need for "new, young blood" "to move ahead with the fast-changing progress occurring in the world", stepped aside, appointing his son Josep Esteve general manager.

Antoni Esteve died in Barcelona in 1979 on the 50th anniversary of the founding of Esteve Laboratories. Four years later, his family created the Dr. Antoni Esteve Foundation to honor his memory. This Foundation's main mission is to stimulate progress in pharmacotherapy through scientific communication and discussion.

== Awards ==
In 1934 he was awarded the gold medal in the VIII Congress of Catalan Physicians and Biologists.

He was a member of the Scientific Section of the Institute of Catalan Studies for more than 25 years, and he also served as its president. He was a founding member of Barcelona's Royal Academy of Pharmacy in 1955 and served on its boards for nearly a decade. In 1959 he founded the Latin Mediterranean Pharmaceutical Society and served as its vice-president. He also served as the vice-president of the Academy of Medical Sciences of Catalonia and the Balearic Islands.

== Legacy ==
Antoni Esteve was the first in Spain to produce organic arsenic compounds, sulfonamides, and penicillin. In addition to these contributions to pharmaceutics, he left a cultural legacy including more than 60 publications and his involvement in various initiatives to promote Catalan culture and language.
