= Josep Esteve i Seguí =

Catalan pharmacist and folklorist (1873–1927)

Josep Esteve i Seguí (7 October 1873 - 4 October 1927) was a Catalan pharmacist and folklorist.

== Early life ==
Seguí was born in Manresa, Spain. He studied pharmacy at the University of Barcelona while working at the Degollada Pharmacy in Barcelona. He received his degree in 1896, and he went back to Manresa to take over the family pharmacy in 1897.

== Career ==
Although he died young, Josep Esteve i Seguí was an important figure in the cultural milieu of Manresa in the first third of the twentieth century. The backroom of the Esteve Pharmacy on Nou Street in Manresa was one of the city's intellectual hubs, a meeting place for people of wide-ranging ideological backgrounds, from staunch Catholics such as physician Oleguer Miró, historian Sarret i Arbós and politician Soler i March to the most socially liberal, led by Esteve i Seguí himself or Pius Font i Quer, all within the framework of Catalan nationalism.

Esteve worked with the Institut d'Estudis Catalans (Institute of Catalan Studies) in Manresa. He founded the Centre Excursionista de la Comarca de Bages (Bages County Hiking Club) in 1905; he was its first president and edited its bulletin, where he published a collection of songs and proverbs. He founded and directed the Orfeó Manresà, an amateur choral society, in 1901, Esbart Manresà de Dansaires, a group dedicated to traditional folk dances, in 1909, and the newspaper Bages-Ciutat.

He published articles about the geography and folklore of the county in various local publications and in publications based in Barcelona.

== Personal life ==
He had a strong influence on the upbringing and orientation of his son, Antoni Esteve i Subirana. He died of a heart attack on October 4, 1927, a few days after his 56th birthday, as his son remarked “without having been able to see the arrival of the Republic”.
