= Esteve Foundation =

The Esteve Foundation is a non-profit, internationally focused institution with the primary goal of fostering progress in pharmacotherapy by ways of scientific communication and discussion. The Foundation organizes international symposiums, roundtables, and discussion groups. It also helps disseminate quality scientific research by awarding a prize every two years for the best scientific article published by authors from Spain.

== History ==
It was endowed in 1983 by the children of Dr. Antoni Esteve to honor their father, a renowned pharmacist, researcher, and entrepreneur, and to promulgate his love and respect for science. From the very beginning, the foundation is reaching a growing number of activities: in 2016 a total of 121 activities, including face to face activities and publications.

== Objectives ==
The Foundation fosters communication among professionals by organizing international symposiums, roundtables, and discussion groups. It also promotes scientific communication in the broadest sense by publishing monographs summarizing the contents of the roundtables, books covering the contributions to the symposia, notebooks focusing on the world of science, and articles in scientific journals, reporting agreements reached by the international discussion groups and similar topics. Another special contribution that the Foundation makes to the sharing of scientific knowledge is the book collection “Pharmacotherapy Revisited”. Each of these books recompiles in facsimile thirty-odd articles selected by prestigious scientists to show key developments in different branches of pharmacotherapy.

The Foundation organizes seminars with the aim of strengthening competencies that are often inadequately covered in degree programs at institutions of higher learning. Thus, these seminars cover topics such as how to elaborate and deliver scientific presentations, whether in Catalan, Spanish, or English; how to structure a research project; how to get started in problem-based learning; how to write a scientific article; or how to prepare a very concise video to promote a scientific project or educational activity. These seminars are mainly held in Spain, but have also been done in other countries in Europe and America. Another activity, which lies halfway between teaching and scientific communication, consists of meetings in which a small group of Spanish researchers are invited to discuss key issues in their field with a renowned international expert.

Last but not least, the Foundation is involved in many collaborative projects with universities, scientific societies, research institutions, or bodies that provide support to research. These collaborations often give rise to scientific publications, and these are reproduced on the Foundation’s website, where it is also possible to consult and download the vast majority of the publications mentioned in this summary and sign up for the various seminars and other activities.
