= European Academies' Science Advisory Council =

European Academies Science Advisory Council
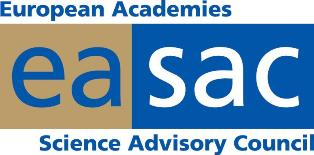
- Abbreviation: EASAC
- Type: Regional Association of National Academies of Science
- Headquarters: Vienna, Austria
- Region served: The European Union, Norway, Switzerland and the UK
- Members: National Academies of the EU Member States, the Academia Europaea and ALLEA
- President: Lise Øvreås (NO),
- Vice presidents: Lise Øvreås (NO), Birgitta Henriques-Normark (SE), Brian Norton (IR), Hanna-Leena Pesonen (FI), Mirko Orlić (HR).
- Website: https://easac.eu

The European Academies Science Advisory Council (EASAC) is a regional association of National Academies of science. EASAC comprises 29 member institutions: the national science academies of the European Union (EU) Member States, Norway, Switzerland, the United Kingdom, and the pan-European organisations Academia Europaea and ALLEA. EASAC was founded in June 2001 and since 1 January 2024 it is hosted by the Austrian Academy of Sciences in Vienna.

EASAC was set up as a mechanism of collaboration for its member Academies, in particular for providing “science-for-policy” advice to the institutions of the EU. This means that through EASAC scientific advice is offered jointly by the Academies to the European Commission and the European Parliament EASAC's work also aims to help inform national policy-making across Europe, and engage European media and societies. EASAC aims to provide science-based analysis and recommendations on questions that are of relevance to EU policy thinking and development, e.g. on plastics in the circular economy, genetically modified crops, climate change and health, forest biomass for energy, or decarbonisation of transport.

The association is funded by EASAC member Academies. Since 2012 the IAP - The InterAcademy Partnership has also provided funds to EASAC which functions as IAP’s regional affiliated network for Europe.

== EASAC Core Programmes and "Science-Policy Dialogue" ==
The three core programmes of EASAC are Biosciences and Public Health, Energy, and Environment. They explore areas where scientific evidence can help to inform the development of policy-making in the European institutions and, when relevant, also global policy-making. Project remits require both considerations of the implications of the scientific evidence for policy formulation and the evaluation of the adequacy of the relevant science base. Each programme is run by a Programme Director and a Steering Panel consisting of scientists nominated by EASAC member Academies. Members of the three EASAC Steering Panels are chosen for their experience in the respective field and together they advise EASAC on specific projects and help build relations with other expert scientists in the EU.

=== Biosciences and Public Health ===
The aim of the Biosciences and Public Health Programme is to inform policy-makers through scientific analysis on topics such as health, agriculture, and the progression of novel technologies with potentially multiple applications. The scope of the programme includes e.g. biotechnology, nanotechnology, synthetic biology, personalised medicine, and biosecurity. The Steering Panel is co-chaired by André Knottnerus and Bert Rima. The Programme Director Thomas Cole-Hunter is responsible for the programme's general organisation, project management, delivery and quality control, and day-to-day business.

=== Energy ===
The Energy Programme provides scientific assessments and advice to EU policy-makers in the areas of energy and climate change-related topics. The programme covers a range of issues of concern to the EU, including energy resources, energy systems integration, renewable energies, energy efficiency, greenhouse gas emissions, electricity grid management, and energy security. The Energy Steering Panel is co-chaired by Professor Hanna-Leena Pesonen and Professor Neven Duić. The Programme Director Dr. Alessandro Allegra is responsible for the programme’s general organisation, project management, delivery and quality control, and day-to-day business.

=== Environment ===
The Environment Programme provides scientific assessments and advice to EU environment policy communities on topics including climate change, air and water quality, wastes and resources, biodiversity, ecosystems, and sustainability. The Steering Panel is co-chaired by Fiona Regan (IE) and András Báldi (HU). The Programme Director Professor Thomas Elmqvist is responsible for the programme’s general organisation, project management, delivery and quality control, and day-to-day business.

=== Science-Policy Dialogue ===
Since 2012, EASAC has engaged with its member Academies in a number of activities under the headline of "Science-Policy Dialogue". These have generally focused on sharing of good practice of member Academies on questions such as the management of working groups and engagement with policy-makers and the media. As a result of the first such activity, a document on Good Practice Guidance for Managing Dialogue Between Academies of Science and Policy Communities was published in 2013. In 2017-2018, EASAC's members reflected on the Sustainable Development Goals (SDG) and how the European and global networks of Science Academies could contribute to the United Nations SDG process. Since 2020, EASAC has organised a series of virtual 'Science Communications Webinars', focusing on the contribution of the European Science Academies to the efforts to overcome the COVID-19 pandemic in Europe.

== Organisational structure ==
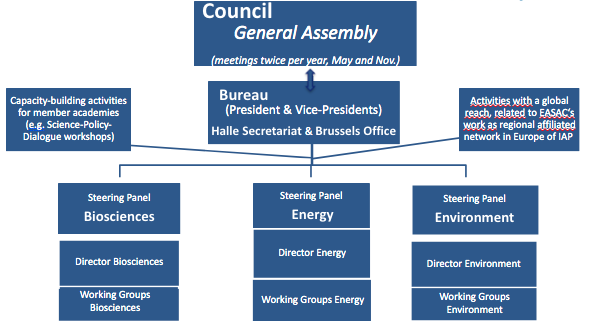
EASAC Organigram

=== Council ===
The Council is EASAC's assembly and governing body. It is composed of 30 scientists, nominated by, and representing, EASAC members. Council members are expected to regularly consult with their Academies about EASAC business to make decisions on their behalf at Council meetings. Council sets EASAC's direction, agrees on the initiation of projects, monitors their progress, and reviews and approves reports and other types of documents for publication. It meets every six months, at the Academy of the EU Member State which will take over the EU Presidency about one month later.

=== Bureau ===
The Bureau comprises the EASAC President, Vice-Presidents, and the past and incoming Presidents (for one year after and before tenure, respectively). Since 2012, Bureau has co-opted the Chairs of EASAC’s Steering Panels as members. EASAC Bureau meets at least four times per year and is accountable to Council: it is responsible for implementing Council’s decisions and ensuring EASAC business runs smoothly. It is supported by the EASAC Secretariat, which is managed by the Executive Director and also comprises the Programme Directors, Management Officers and others.

=== Secretariat ===
Originally managed and hosted by the British Royal Society, the Secretariat was hosted by the German National Academy of Sciences Leopoldina in Halle until 31 December 2022. EASAC’s Brussels Office at the Royal Academies for Science and the Arts of Belgium is also part of the Secretariat. As of January 1, 2024, the EASAC Secretariat is hosted by the Austrian Academy of Sciences and is based in Vienna.

The Secretariat is responsible for maintaining the working process of EASAC's groups, including the organisation of meetings of Council, Bureau, Programme Steering Panels, and working groups. It oversees management of EASAC working groups' outputs towards publication, launch and dissemination of EASAC reports, statements, and commentaries. It liaises with EU policy-makers, EU institutions, and other EU and national agencies of relevance to EASAC's work. The Secretariat maintains contact with EASAC member Academies and liaises with other Academy networks. The Secretariat also manages EASAC's communication activities, such as press releases, newsletters, website, and social media pages.

=== Members ===
- Academia Europaea
- All European Academies
- Royal Academies for Science and the Arts of Belgium
- Bulgarian Academy of Sciences
- Croatian Academy of Sciences and Arts
- Cyprus Academy of Sciences, Letters and Arts
- Royal Danish Academy of Sciences and Letters
- German Academy of Sciences Leopoldina
- Estonian Academy of Sciences
- Council of Finnish Academies
- Académie des sciences
- Academy of Athens
- Royal Society
- Royal Dutch Academy of Sciences
- Royal Irish Academy
- Accademia Nazionale dei Lincei
- Latvian Academy of Sciences
- Lithuanian Academy of Sciences
- Norwegian Academy of Sciences
- Austrian Academy of Sciences
- Polish Academy of Sciences
- Lisbon Academy of Sciences
- Romanian Academy
- Royal Swedish Academy of Sciences
- Swiss Academies of Arts and Sciences
- Slovak Academy of Sciences
- Slovenian Academy of Sciences and Arts
- Real Academia de Ciencias Exactas, Físicas y Naturales
- Academy of Sciences of the Czech Republic
- Hungarian Academy of Sciences

== Cooperations ==
EASAC cooperates with a number of other organisations and networks, most notably IAP.

=== IAP ===
EASAC is the affiliated network for Europe of the InterAcademy Partnership (IAP). The IAP is the global network of more than 140 National Academies of science, medicine and engineering.

A part of IAP's work is done through its four regional networks in Africa, Asia, the Americas, and Europe. Through IAP, EASAC connects with national science academies around the globe. EASAC has collaborated with all the three other regional networks of IAP: the Association of Academies and Societies of Sciences in Asia (AASSA), the InterAmerican Network of Academies of Sciences (IANAS) and the Network of African Science Academies (NASAC), in particular on the project "Food and Nutrition Security and Agriculture" (2017-18). EASAC research also provided the basis for IAP projects such as the recent "Climate Change and Health" project, which aims to produce regional assessments similar to the EASAC report, and a global synthesis in late 2021.
