= Quéré =

Quéré is a family name which means cordwainer in Breton (Kere). It may refer to:

- Agnès Bénassy-Quéré
- Catherine Quéré (born 1948), a member of the National Assembly of France
- Christian Quéré (1955–2006), French footballer
- Corinne Le Quéré, Canadian scientist
- Françoise Quéré (a.k.a. Rosette, born 1959), a French actress
- France Quéré (1936–1995), French Protestant theologian, writer
- René Quéré
- Yves Quéré
