= List of statements by major scientific organizations about climate change =

This is a list of statements by major scientific organizations about climate change, that have issued formal statements of opinion, classifies those organizations according to whether they concur with the IPCC view (i.e. the scientific consensus on climate change), are non-committal, or dissent from it.

The California Governor's Office website lists nearly 200 worldwide scientific organizations who hold the position that climate change has been caused by human action.

== Concurring with current scientific consensus ==
=== Science bodies ===
==== Academies of science (general science) ====
Since 2001, 34 national science academies, three regional academies, and both the international InterAcademy Council and International Council of Academies of Engineering and Technological Sciences have made formal declarations confirming human induced global warming and urging nations to reduce emissions of greenhouse gases. The 34 national science academy statements include 33 who have signed joint science academy statements and one individual declaration by the Polish Academy of Sciences in 2007.

===== Joint national science academy statements =====
- 2001 Following the publication of the IPCC Third Assessment Report, seventeen national science academies issued a joint statement, entitled "The Science of Climate Change", explicitly acknowledging the IPCC position as representing the scientific consensus on climate change science. The statement, printed in an editorial in the journal Science on 18 May 2001, was signed by the science academies of Australia, Belgium, Brazil, Canada, the Caribbean, China, France, Germany, India, Indonesia, Ireland, Italy, Malaysia, New Zealand, Sweden, Turkey, and the United Kingdom.
- 2005 The national science academies of the G8 nations, plus Brazil, China and India, three of the largest emitters of greenhouse gases in the developing world, signed a statement on the global response to climate change. The statement stresses that the scientific understanding of climate change is now sufficiently clear to justify nations taking prompt action, and explicitly endorsed the IPCC consensus. The eleven signatories were the science academies of Brazil, Canada, China, France, Germany, India, Italy, Japan, Russia, the United Kingdom, and the United States.
- 2007 In preparation for the 33rd G8 summit, the national science academies of the G8+5 nations issued a declaration referencing the position of the 2005 joint science academies' statement, and acknowledging the confirmation of their previous conclusion by recent research. Following the IPCC Fourth Assessment Report, the declaration states, "It is unequivocal that the climate is changing, and it is very likely that this is predominantly caused by the increasing human interference with the atmosphere. These changes will transform the environmental conditions on Earth unless counter-measures are taken." The thirteen signatories were the national science academies of Brazil, Canada, China, France, Germany, Italy, India, Japan, Mexico, Russia, South Africa, the United Kingdom, and the United States.
- 2007 In preparation for the 33rd G8 summit, the Network of African Science Academies submitted a joint "statement on sustainability, energy efficiency, and climate change":
  A consensus, based on current evidence, now exists within the global scientific community that human activities are the main source of climate change and that the burning of fossil fuels is largely responsible for driving this change. The IPCC should be congratulated for the contribution it has made to public understanding of the nexus that exists between energy, climate and sustainability.
  — The thirteen signatories were the science academies of Cameroon, Ghana, Kenya, Madagascar, Nigeria, Senegal, South Africa, Sudan, Tanzania, Uganda, Zambia, Zimbabwe, as well as the African Academy of Sciences,
- 2008 In preparation for the 34th G8 summit, the national science academies of the G8+5 nations issued a declaration reiterating the position of the 2005 joint science academies' statement, and reaffirming "that climate change is happening and that anthropogenic warming is influencing many physical and biological systems". Among other actions, the declaration urges all nations to "[t]ake appropriate economic and policy measures to accelerate transition to a low carbon society and to encourage and effect changes in individual and national behaviour". The thirteen signatories were the same national science academies that issued the 2007 joint statement.
- 2009 In advance of the UNFCCC negotiations to be held in Copenhagen in December 2009, the national science academies of the G8+5 nations issued a joint statement declaring, "Climate change and sustainable energy supply are crucial challenges for the future of humanity. It is essential that world leaders agree on the emission reductions needed to combat negative consequences of anthropogenic climate change". The statement references the IPCC's Fourth Assessment of 2007, and asserts that "climate change is happening even faster than previously estimated; global CO_{2} emissions since 2000 have been higher than even the highest predictions, Arctic sea ice has been melting at rates much faster than predicted, and the rise in the sea level has become more rapid". The thirteen signatories were the same national science academies that issued the 2007 and 2008 joint statements.

===== Polish Academy of Sciences =====
In December 2007, the General Assembly of the Polish Academy of Sciences (Polska Akademia Nauk), which has not been a signatory to joint national science academy statements issued a declaration endorsing the IPCC conclusions, and stating:

it is the duty of Polish science and the national government to, in a thoughtful, organized and active manner, become involved in realisation of these ideas.

Problems of global warming, climate change, and their various negative impacts on human life and on the functioning of entire societies are one of the most dramatic challenges of modern times.

PAS General Assembly calls on the national scientific communities and the national government to actively support Polish participation in this important endeavor.

===== Additional national science academy and society statements =====
Through its Committee on the Science of Climate Change in 2001, the United States National Research Council published Climate Change Science: An Analysis of Some Key Questions. This report explicitly endorses the IPCC view of attribution of recent climate change as representing the view of the scientific community:

The changes observed over the last several decades are likely mostly due to human activities, but we cannot rule out that some significant part of these changes is also a reflection of natural variability. Human-induced warming and associated sea level rises are expected to continue through the 21st century. ... The IPCC's conclusion that most of the observed warming of the last 50 years is likely to have been due to the increase in greenhouse gas concentrations accurately reflects the current thinking of the scientific community on this issue.

The American Association for the Advancement of Science adopted an official statement on climate change in 2006: "The scientific evidence is clear: global climate change caused by human activities is occurring now, and it is a growing threat to society. ... The pace of change and the evidence of harm have increased markedly over the last five years. The time to control greenhouse gas emissions is now."

In 2008, the Federation of Australian Scientific and Technological Societies published FASTS Statement on Climate Change, which states,

Global climate change is real and measurable. ... To reduce the global net economic, environmental and social losses in the face of these impacts, the policy objective must remain squarely focused on returning greenhouse gas concentrations to near pre-industrial levels through the reduction of emissions. The spatial and temporal fingerprint of warming can be traced to increasing greenhouse gas concentrations in the atmosphere, which are a direct result of burning fossil fuels, broad-scale deforestation and other human activity.

Also in 2008, the US National Academy of Sciences stated, "In the judgment of most climate scientists, Earth's warming in recent decades has been caused primarily by human activities that have increased the amount of greenhouse gases in the atmosphere [...] On climate change, [the National Academies' reports] have assessed consensus findings on the science."

Having signed onto the first joint science academy statement in 2001, the Royal Society of New Zealand released a separate statement in 2008 in order to clear up "the controversy over climate change and its causes, and possible confusion among the public"

The globe is warming because of increasing greenhouse gas emissions. Measurements show that greenhouse gas concentrations in the atmosphere are well above levels seen for many thousands of years. Further global climate changes are predicted, with impacts expected to become more costly as time progresses. Reducing future impacts of climate change will require substantial reductions of greenhouse gas emissions.

The Royal Society of the United Kingdom has not changed its concurring stance reflected in its participation in joint national science academies' statements on anthropogenic global warming in 2001. According to the Telegraph, "The most prestigious group of scientists in the country was forced to act after fellows complained that doubts over man made global warming were not being communicated to the public". In May 2010, it announced that it "is presently drafting a new public facing document on climate change, to provide an updated status report on the science in an easily accessible form, also addressing the levels of certainty of key components." The society says that it had been three years since the last such document was published and that, after an extensive process of debate and review, the new document was printed in September 2010. It summarises the current scientific evidence and highlights the areas where the science is well established, where there is still some debate, and where substantial uncertainties remain. The society has stated that "this is not the same as saying that the climate science itself is in error – no Fellows have expressed such a view to the RS". The introduction includes their statement that "There is strong evidence that the warming of the Earth over the last half-century has been caused largely by human activity, such as the burning of fossil fuels and changes in land use, including agriculture and deforestation."

===== International science academies =====
- African Academy of Sciences in 2007 was a signatory to the "statement on sustainability, energy efficiency, and climate change". This joint statement of African science academies, was organized through the Network of African Science Academies. Its stated goal was "to convey information and spur action on the occasion of the G8 Summit in Heiligendamm, Germany, in June 2007":
  A consensus, based on current evidence, now exists within the global scientific community that human activities are the main source of climate change and that the burning of fossil fuels is largely responsible for driving this change.
- European Academy of Sciences and Arts in 2007 issued a formal declaration on climate change titled Let's Be Honest:
  Human activity is most likely responsible for climate warming. Most of the climatic warming over the last 50 years is likely to have been caused by increased concentrations of greenhouse gases in the atmosphere. Documented long-term climate changes include changes in Arctic temperatures and ice, widespread changes in precipitation amounts, ocean salinity, wind patterns and extreme weather including droughts, heavy precipitation, heat waves and the intensity of tropical cyclones. The above development potentially has dramatic consequences for mankind's future.
- European Science Foundation in a 2007 position paper states:
  There is now convincing evidence that since the industrial revolution, human activities, resulting in increasing concentrations of greenhouse gases have become a major agent of climate change ... On-going and increased efforts to mitigate climate change through reduction in greenhouse gases are therefore crucial.
- InterAcademy Council As the representative of the world's scientific and engineering academies, the InterAcademy Council issued a report in 2007 titled Lighting the Way: Toward a Sustainable Energy Future:
  Current patterns of energy resources and energy usage are proving detrimental to the long-term welfare of humanity. The integrity of essential natural systems is already at risk from climate change caused by the atmospheric emissions of greenhouse gases. Concerted efforts should be mounted for improving energy efficiency and reducing the carbon intensity of the world economy.
- International Council of Academies of Engineering and Technological Sciences (CAETS) in 2007, issued a Statement on Environment and Sustainable Growth:
  As reported by the Intergovernmental Panel on Climate Change (IPCC), most of the observed global warming since the mid-20th century is very likely due to human-produced emission of greenhouse gases and this warming will continue unabated if present anthropogenic emissions continue or, worse, expand without control. CAETS, therefore, endorses the many recent calls to decrease and control greenhouse gas emissions to an acceptable level as quickly as possible.

==== Physical and chemical sciences ====
- American Chemical Society
- American Institute of Physics
- American Physical Society
- Australian Institute of Physics
- European Physical Society

==== Earth sciences ====
===== American Geophysical Union =====
The American Geophysical Union (AGU) adopted a statement on Climate Change and Greenhouse Gases in 1998. A new statement, adopted by the society in 2003, revised in 2007, and revised and expanded in 2013, affirms that rising levels of greenhouse gases have caused and will continue to cause the global surface temperature to be warmer:

Human activities are changing Earth's climate. At the global level, atmospheric concentrations of carbon dioxide and other heat-trapping greenhouse gases have increased sharply since the Industrial Revolution. Fossil fuel burning dominates this increase. Human-caused increases in greenhouse gases are responsible for most of the observed global average surface warming of roughly 0.8 °C (1.5 °F) over the past 140 years. Because natural processes cannot quickly remove some of these gases (notably carbon dioxide) from the atmosphere, our past, present, and future emissions will influence the climate system for millennia. While important scientific uncertainties remain as to which particular impacts will be experienced where, no uncertainties are known that could make the impacts of climate change inconsequential. Furthermore, surprise outcomes, such as the unexpectedly rapid loss of Arctic summer sea ice, may entail even more dramatic changes than anticipated.

===== American Society of Agronomy, Crop Science Society of America, and Soil Science Society of America =====
In May 2011, the American Society of Agronomy (ASA), Crop Science Society of America (CSSA), and Soil Science Society of America (SSSA) issued a joint position statement on climate change as it relates to agriculture:

A comprehensive body of scientific evidence indicates beyond reasonable doubt that global climate change is now occurring and that its manifestations threaten the stability of societies as well as natural and managed ecosystems. Increases in ambient temperatures and changes in related processes are directly linked to rising anthropogenic greenhouse gas (GHG) concentrations in the atmosphere.

Unless the emissions of GHGs are curbed significantly, their concentrations will continue to rise, leading to changes in temperature, precipitation, and other climate variables that will undoubtedly affect agriculture around the world.

Climate change has the potential to increase weather variability as well as gradually increase global temperatures. Both of these impacts have the potential to negatively impact the adaptability and resilience of the world's food production capacity; current research indicates climate change is already reducing the productivity of vulnerable cropping systems.

===== European Federation of Geologists =====
In 2008, the European Federation of Geologists (EFG) issued the position paper Carbon Capture and geological Storage:

The EFG recognizes the work of the IPCC and other organizations, and subscribes to the major findings that climate change is happening, is predominantly caused by anthropogenic emissions of CO_{2}, and poses a significant threat to human civilization.

It is clear that major efforts are necessary to quickly and strongly reduce CO_{2} emissions. The EFG strongly advocates renewable and sustainable energy production, including geothermal energy, as well as the need for increasing energy efficiency.

CCS [Carbon Capture and geological Storage] should also be regarded as a bridging technology, facilitating the move towards a carbon free economy.

===== European Geosciences Union =====
In 2005, the Divisions of Atmospheric and Climate Sciences of the European Geosciences Union (EGU) issued a position statement in support of the Joint national science academy statements on global response to climate change. The statement refers to the Intergovernmental Panel on Climate Change (IPCC), as "the main representative of the global scientific community", and asserts that the IPCC:

...represents the state-of-the-art of climate science supported by the major science academies around the world and by the vast majority of science researchers and investigators as documented by the peer-reviewed scientific literature.

Additionally, in 2008, the EGU issued a position statement on ocean acidification which states, "Ocean acidification is already occurring today and will continue to intensify, closely tracking atmospheric CO_{2} increase. Given the potential threat to marine ecosystems and its ensuing impact on human society and economy, especially as it acts in conjunction with anthropogenic global warming, there is an urgent need for immediate action." The statement then advocates for strategies "to limit future release of CO_{2} to the atmosphere and/or enhance removal of excess CO_{2} from the atmosphere". And, in 2018 the EGU issued a statement concurring with the findings of the Special Report on Global Warming of 1.5 °C, with Jonathan Bamber, president of the organisation, noting: "EGU concurs with, and supports, the findings of the SR15 that action to curb the most dangerous consequences of human-induced climate change is urgent, of the utmost importance and the window of opportunity extremely limited."

===== Geological Society of America =====
In 2006, the Geological Society of America adopted a position statement on global climate change. It amended this position on 20 April 2010, with more explicit comments on need for CO_{2} reduction:

Decades of scientific research have shown that climate can change from both natural and anthropogenic causes. The Geological Society of America (GSA) concurs with assessments by the National Academies of Science (2005), the National Research Council (2006), and the Intergovernmental Panel on Climate Change (IPCC, 2007) that global climate has warmed and that human activities (mainly greenhouse‐gas emissions) account for most of the warming since the middle 1900s. If current trends continue, the projected increase in global temperature by the end of the twenty first century will result in large impacts on humans and other species. Addressing the challenges posed by climate change will require a combination of adaptation to the changes that are likely to occur and global reductions of CO_{2} emissions from anthropogenic sources.

===== Geological Society of London =====
In November 2010, the Geological Society of London issued the position statement Climate change: evidence from the geological record:

The last century has seen a rapidly growing global population and much more intensive use of resources, leading to greatly increased emissions of gases, such as carbon dioxide and methane, from the burning of fossil fuels (oil, gas and coal), and from agriculture, cement production and deforestation. Evidence from the geological record is consistent with the physics that shows that adding large amounts of carbon dioxide to the atmosphere warms the world and may lead to: higher sea levels and flooding of low-lying coasts; greatly changed patterns of rainfall; increased acidity of the oceans; and decreased oxygen levels in seawater. There is now widespread concern that the Earth's climate will warm further, not only because of the lingering effects of the added carbon already in the system, but also because of further additions as human population continues to grow. Life on Earth has survived large climate changes in the past, but extinctions and major redistribution of species have been associated with many of them. When the human population was small and nomadic, a rise in sea level of a few metres would have had very little effect on Homo sapiens. With the current and growing global population, much of which is concentrated in coastal cities, such a rise in sea level would have a drastic effect on our complex society, especially if the climate were to change as suddenly as it has at times in the past. Equally, it seems likely that as warming continues some areas may experience less precipitation leading to drought. With both rising seas and increasing drought, pressure for human migration could result on a large scale.

===== International Union of Geodesy and Geophysics =====
In July 2007, the International Union of Geodesy and Geophysics (IUGG) adopted a resolution titled "The Urgency of Addressing Climate Change". In it, the IUGG concurs with the "comprehensive and widely accepted and endorsed scientific assessments carried out by the Intergovernmental Panel on Climate Change and regional and national bodies, which have firmly established, on the basis of scientific evidence, that human activities are the primary cause of recent climate change". They state further that the "continuing reliance on combustion of fossil fuels as the world's primary source of energy will lead to much higher atmospheric concentrations of greenhouse gases, which will, in turn, cause significant increases in surface temperature, sea level, ocean acidification, and their related consequences to the environment and society".

===== National Association of Geoscience Teachers =====
In July 2009, the National Association of Geoscience Teachers (NAGT) adopted a position statement on climate change in which they assert that "Earth's climate is changing [and] "that present warming trends are largely the result of human activities":

NAGT strongly supports and will work to promote education in the science of climate change, the causes and effects of current global warming, and the immediate need for policies and actions that reduce the emission of greenhouse gases.

==== Meteorology and oceanography ====
===== American Meteorological Society =====
The American Meteorological Society (AMS) published a statement supporting the IPCC consensus in 2003.

The nature of science is such that there is rarely total agreement among scientists. Individual scientific statements and papers—the validity of some of which has yet to be assessed adequately—can be exploited in the policy debate and can leave the impression that the scientific community is sharply divided on issues where there is, in reality, a strong scientific consensus ... IPCC assessment reports are prepared at approximately five-year intervals by a large international group of experts who represent the broad range of expertise and perspectives relevant to the issues. The reports strive to reflect a consensus evaluation of the results of the full body of peer-reviewed research ... They provide an analysis of what is known and not known, the degree of consensus, and some indication of the degree of confidence that can be placed on the various statements and conclusions.

The statement adopted by the AMS council in 2012 concluded:

There is unequivocal evidence that Earth's lower atmosphere, ocean, and land surface are warming; sea level is rising; and snow cover, mountain glaciers, and Arctic sea ice are shrinking. The dominant cause of the warming since the 1950s is human activities. This scientific finding is based on a large and persuasive body of research. The observed warming will be irreversible for many years into the future, and even larger temperature increases will occur as greenhouse gases continue to accumulate in the atmosphere. Avoiding this future warming will require a large and rapid reduction in global greenhouse gas emissions. The ongoing warming will increase risks and stresses to human societies, economies, ecosystems, and wildlife through the 21st century and beyond, making it imperative that society respond to a changing climate. To inform decisions on adaptation and mitigation, it is critical that we improve our understanding of the global climate system and our ability to project future climate through continued and improved monitoring and research. This is especially true for smaller (seasonal and regional) scales and weather and climate extremes, and for important hydroclimatic variables such as precipitation and water availability. Technological, economic, and policy choices in the near future will determine the extent of future impacts of climate change. Science-based decisions are seldom made in a context of absolute certainty. National and international policy discussions should include consideration of the best ways to both adapt to and mitigate climate change. Mitigation will reduce the amount of future climate change and the risk of impacts that are potentially large and dangerous. At the same time, some continued climate change is inevitable, and policy responses should include adaptation to climate change. Prudence dictates extreme care in accounting for our relationship with the only planet known to be capable of sustaining human life.

A 2016 survey found that two-thirds of AMS members think that all or most of climate change is caused by human activity.

===== Australian Meteorological and Oceanographic Society =====
The Australian Meteorological and Oceanographic Society has issued a Statement on Climate Change, wherein they conclude:

Global climate change and global warming are real and observable ... It is highly likely that those human activities that have increased the concentration of greenhouse gases in the atmosphere have been largely responsible for the observed warming since 1950. The warming associated with increases in greenhouse gases originating from human activity is called the enhanced greenhouse effect. The atmospheric concentration of carbon dioxide has increased by more than 30% since the start of the industrial age and is higher now than at any time in at least the past 650,000 years. This increase is a direct result of burning fossil fuels, broad-scale deforestation and other human activity.

===== Canadian Foundation for Climate and Atmospheric Sciences =====
In November 2005, the Canadian Foundation for Climate and Atmospheric Sciences (CFCAS) issued a letter to the Prime Minister of Canada stating that:

We concur with the climate science assessment of the Intergovernmental Panel on Climate Change (IPCC) in 2001 ... We endorse the conclusions of the IPCC assessment that 'There is new and stronger evidence that most of the warming observed over the last 50 years is attributable to human activities'. ... There is increasingly unambiguous evidence of changing climate in Canada and around the world. There will be increasing impacts of climate change on Canada's natural ecosystems and on our socio-economic activities. Advances in climate science since the 2001 IPCC Assessment have provided more evidence supporting the need for action and development of a strategy for adaptation to projected changes.

===== Canadian Meteorological and Oceanographic Society =====
In November 2009, a letter to the Canadian Parliament by The Canadian Meteorological and Oceanographic Society states:

Rigorous international research, including work carried out and supported by the Government of Canada, reveals that greenhouse gases resulting from human activities contribute to the warming of the atmosphere and the oceans and constitute a serious risk to the health and safety of our society, as well as having an impact on all life.

===== Royal Meteorological Society (UK) =====
In February 2007, after the release of the IPCC's Fourth Assessment Report, the Royal Meteorological Society issued an endorsement of the report. In addition to referring to the IPCC as "[the] world's best climate scientists", they stated that climate change is happening as "the result of emissions since industrialization and we have already set in motion the next 50 years of global warming – what we do from now on will determine how worse it will get."

===== World Meteorological Organization =====
In its Statement at the Twelfth Session of the Conference of the Parties to the U.N. Framework Convention on Climate Change presented on 15 November 2006, the World Meteorological Organization (WMO) confirms the need to "prevent dangerous anthropogenic interference with the climate system". The WMO concurs that "scientific assessments have increasingly reaffirmed that human activities are indeed changing the composition of the atmosphere, in particular through the burning of fossil fuels for energy production and transportation". The WMO concurs that "the present atmospheric concentration of CO_{2} was never exceeded over the past 420,000 years"; and that the IPCC "assessments provide the most authoritative, up-to-date scientific advice".

===== American Quaternary Association =====
The American Quaternary Association (AMQUA) has stated:

Few credible scientists now doubt that humans have influenced the documented rise in global temperatures since the Industrial Revolution. The first government-led U.S. Climate Change Science Program synthesis and assessment report supports the growing body of evidence that warming of the atmosphere, especially over the past 50 years, is directly impacted by human activity.

===== International Union for Quaternary Research =====
The statement on climate change issued by the International Union for Quaternary Research (INQUA) reiterates the conclusions of the IPCC, and urges all nations to take prompt action in line with the UNFCCC principles:

Human activities are now causing atmospheric concentrations of greenhouse gases—including carbon dioxide, methane, tropospheric ozone, and nitrous oxide—to rise well above pre-industrial levels ... Increases in greenhouse gases are causing temperatures to rise ... The scientific understanding of climate change is now sufficiently clear to justify nations taking prompt action ... Minimizing the amount of this carbon dioxide reaching the atmosphere presents a huge challenge but must be a global priority.

==== Biology and life sciences ====
Life science organizations have outlined the dangers climate change pose to wildlife:

- American Association of Wildlife Veterinarians
- American Institute of Biological Sciences. In October 2009, the leaders of 18 US scientific societies and organizations sent an open letter to the United States Senate reaffirming the scientific consensus that climate change is occurring and is primarily caused by human activities. The American Institute of Biological Sciences (AIBS) adopted this letter as their official position statement. The letter goes on to warn of predicted impacts on the United States such as sea level rise and increases in extreme weather events, water scarcity, heat waves, wildfires, and the disturbance of biological systems. It then advocates for a dramatic reduction in emissions of greenhouse gases.
- American Society for Microbiology
- Australian Coral Reef Society, 2006:"There is almost total consensus among experts that the earth's climate is changing as a result of the build-up of greenhouse gases ... There is broad scientific consensus that coral reefs are heavily affected by the activities of man and there are significant global influences that can make reefs more vulnerable such as global warming ..."
- Institute of Biology (UK)
- Society of American Foresters issued two position statements pertaining to climate change in which they cite the IPCC and the UNFCCC.
- The Wildlife Society (international)

==== Human health ====
A number of health organizations have warned about the numerous negative health effects of global warming:

- American Academy of Pediatrics
- American College of Preventive Medicine
- American Medical Association
- American Public Health Association
- Australian Medical Association in 2004 and in 2008
- World Federation of Public Health Associations
- World Health Organization

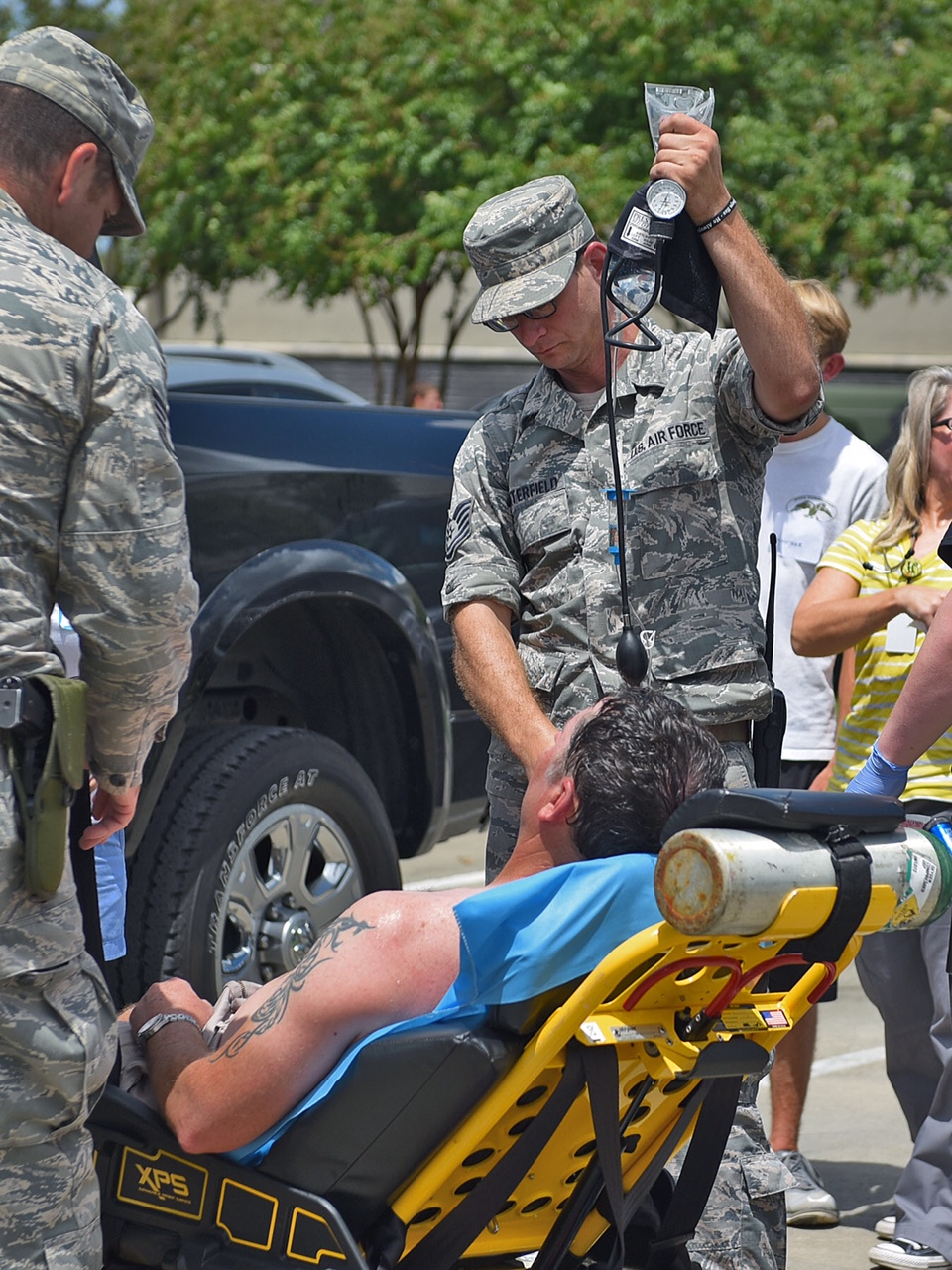
Heat stroke treatment at Baton Rouge during the 2016 Louisiana floods. Climate change is making heat waves more intense, leading to a higher risk of heat stroke.

Climate change affects human health in many ways, including an increase in heat-related illnesses and deaths, worsened air quality, the spread of infectious diseases, and health risks associated with extreme weather such as floods and storms. Rising global temperatures and changes in weather patterns are increasing the severity of heat waves and extreme weather events. These events in turn have direct and indirect impacts on human health. For example, when people are exposed to higher temperatures for longer time periods they might experience heat illness and heat-related death.

In addition to direct impacts, climate change and extreme weather events cause changes in biomes. Certain diseases that are carried and spread by living hosts such as mosquitoes and ticks (known as vectors) may become more common in some regions. Affected diseases include dengue fever and malaria. Contracting waterborne diseases such as diarrhoeal disease will also be more likely.

==== The Bulletin of the Atomic Scientists and "Doomsday clock" ====
In 1945, Albert Einstein and other scientists who created atomic weapons used in the atomic bombings of Hiroshima and Nagasaki founded the "Bulletin of the Atomic Scientists" and created the "Doomsday Clock". The goal of the clock is to convey threats to humanity and the planet, and to create public awareness that will lead to solutions. In the beginning, the Doomsday Clock focused on the dangers of nuclear war, but in the 21st century, it has begun to deal with other issues like climate change and disinformation on the internet.

On 23 January 2020 the organization moved the doomsday clock to 100 seconds before midnight, closer than ever. It explained that it did it because of three factors:

- Increasing danger of nuclear war,
- Increasing danger from climate change, and
- Increasing danger from disinformation on the internet regarding the issues in points 1 and 2 and other "disruptive technologies".

The organization praised the climate movement of young people and called to citizens and governments to act to take greater action on climate change.

==== Miscellaneous ====
A number of other national scientific societies have also endorsed the opinion of the IPCC:

- American Astronomical Society
- American Statistical Association
- Canadian Council of Professional Engineers
- The Institution of Engineers Australia
- International Association for Great Lakes Research
- Institute of Professional Engineers New Zealand
- World Federation of Engineering Organizations (WFEO)

== Non-committal ==
The last national or international scientific body to drop dissent was the American Association of Petroleum Geologists, which in 2007 updated its statement to its current non-committal position. Some other organizations, primarily those focusing on geology, also hold non-committal positions.

=== American Association of Petroleum Geologists ===
As of June 2007, the American Association of Petroleum Geologists (AAPG) Position Statement on climate change stated:

the AAPG membership is divided on the degree of influence that anthropogenic CO_{2} has on recent and potential global temperature increases ... Certain climate simulation models predict that the warming trend will continue, as reported through NAS, AGU, AAAS and AMS. AAPG respects these scientific opinions but wants to add that the current climate warming projections could fall within well-documented natural variations in past climate and observed temperature data. These data do not necessarily support the maximum case scenarios forecast in some models.

Prior to the adoption of this statement, the AAPG was the only major scientific organization that rejected the finding of significant human influence on recent climate, according to a statement by the Council of the American Quaternary Association. Explaining the plan for a revision, AAPG president Lee Billingsly wrote in March 2007:

Members have threatened to not renew their memberships ... if AAPG does not alter its position on global climate change ... And I have been told of members who already have resigned in previous years because of our current global climate change position ... The current policy statement is not supported by a significant number of our members and prospective members.

AAPG President John Lorenz announced the "sunsetting" of AAPG's Global Climate Change Committee in January 2010. The AAPG Executive Committee determined:

Climate change is peripheral at best to our science ... AAPG does not have credibility in that field ... and as a group we have no particular knowledge of global atmospheric geophysics.

=== American Institute of Professional Geologists (AIPG) ===
The official position statement from AIPG on the Environment states that "combustion of fossil fuel include and the generation of GHGs [greenhouse gases] including carbon dioxide (CO2) and methane (CH4). Emissions of GHGs are perceived by some to be one of the largest, global environmental concerns related to energy production due to potential effects on the global energy system and possibly global climate. Fossil fuel use is the primary source of the increased atmospheric concentration of GHGs since industrialization".

In March 2010, AIPG's Executive Director issued a statement regarding polarization of opinions on climate change within the membership and announced that the AIPG Executive had made a decision to cease publication of articles and opinion pieces concerning climate change in AIPG's news journal, The Professional Geologist.

== Opposing ==
Since 2007, when the American Association of Petroleum Geologists released a revised statement, no longer does any national or international scientific body reject the findings of human-induced effects on climate change.

== See also ==
- Climate change denial
- History of climate change science
- List of climate scientists
- Scientific consensus on climate change
