= Mohamed Hag Ali Hassan =

Sudanese mathematician and physicist (born 1947)

Professor Mohamed Hag Ali Hassan OMRI GCONMC FAAS FIAS FTWAS ForMemRS
- محمد حاج علي حاج الحسن
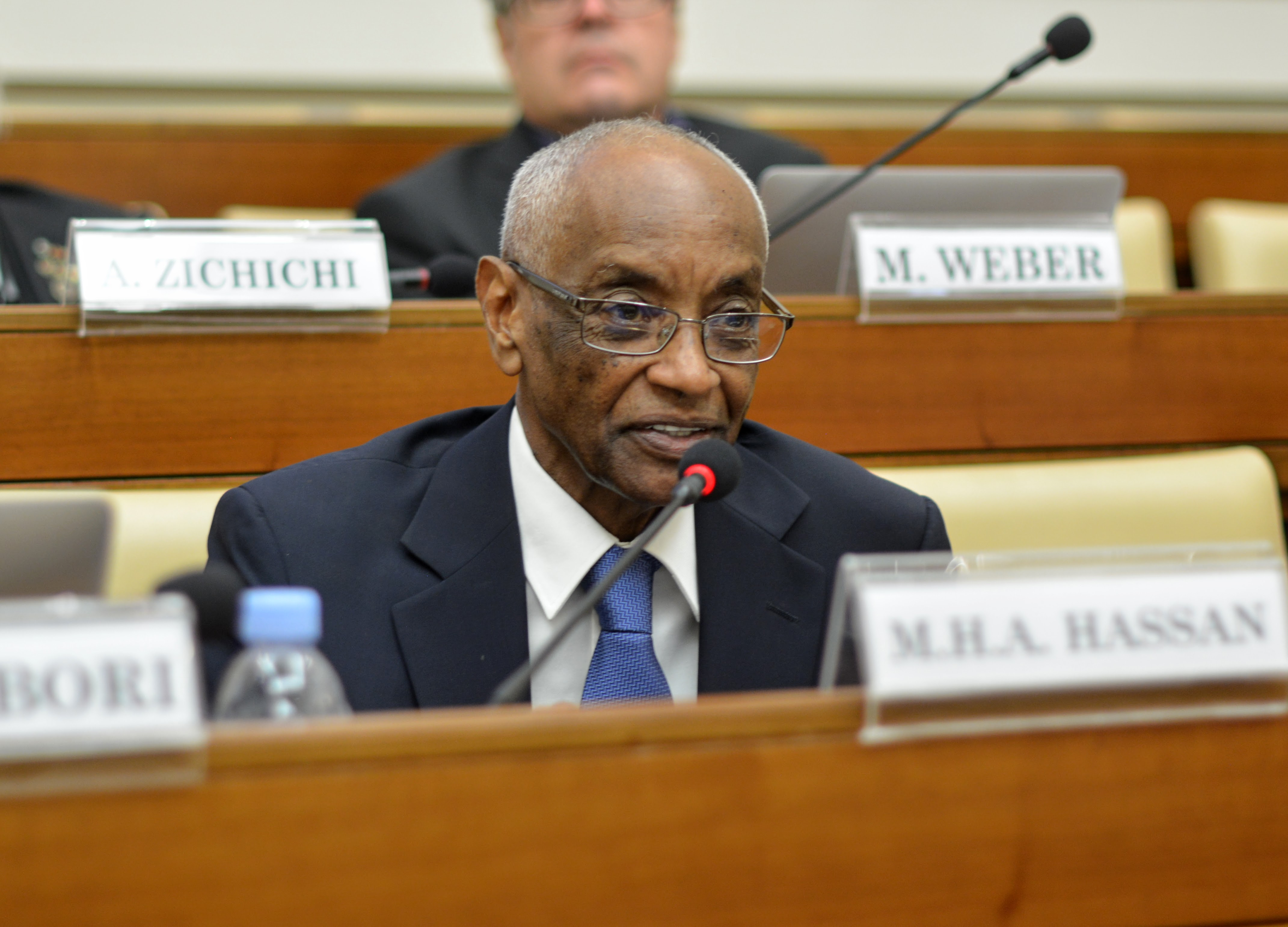
- Hassan at the Pontifical Academy of Sciences, November 2018
- Born: Mohamed Hag Ali Hag el Hassan; 21 November 1947 (age 78); El Geteina, Sudan
- Citizenship: Sudan; Italy
- Education: University of Newcastle upon Tyne (BSc); University of Oxford (MSc, DPhil)
- Scientific career
- Fields: Applied mathematics Plasma physics Environmental modelling Geophysics; Astrophysics

Mohamed Hag Ali Hag el Hassan (Arabic: محمد حاج علي حاج الحسن; born 21 November 1947) is a Sudanese-Italian mathematician and physicist who co-founded numerous scientific councils. He is the President of Sudanese National Academy of Sciences, and was the President of The World Academy of Sciences, African Academy of Sciences (1999–2010), and Network of African Science Academies. He was also the Director of Secretariat of InterAcademy Partnership (2010–2016).

== Early life ==
Hassan was born in Elgetina, Sudan, on 21 November 1947.

He obtained a bachelor's degree (B.Sc.) with special honours from the University of Newcastle Upon Tyne in 1968, followed by an M.Sc in Advanced Mathematics from the University of Oxford in 1969.

He obtained his DPhil in Plasma Physics from the University of Oxford in 1974.

== Career ==
Hassan returned to Sudan later became Professor and Dean of the School of Mathematical Sciences, University of Khartoum from 1985 to 1986.

Frustrated by scientific stagnation in Sudan, and at the request of his father, Hassan visited Italy and was then motivated to re-peruse science again by Nobel Prize laureate Abdus Salam who was (at time) working at the International Centre for Theoretical Physics (ICTP), Trieste. Abdus Salam offered Hassan an associate membership at ICTP to provide a conducive environment for research.

Hassan has a long list of publications in theoretical plasma physics and fusion energy, environmental modelling of soil erosion in drylands, and geophysics, astrophysics and space physics. He has also published several articles on science and technology in the developing world.

Hassan was the founding Executive Director of the Academy of Science for the Developing World (TWAS) in 1983, President of the African Academy of Sciences in 2000, President of the Network of Academies of Science in Africa (NASAC) in 2001 and Chairman, President of the Sudanese National Academy of Sciences, Director of Secretariat of InterAcademy Partnership (IAP) in 2001, Honorary Presidential Advisory Council for Science and Technology, Nigeria in 2001, and Chair of the Governing Council of the United Nations Technology Bank for the Least Developed Countries. He also is a founding member of the Lebanese Academy of Sciences.

He is a member of several merit-based academies of science, including TWAS, the African Academy of Sciences, Islamic World Academy of Sciences, Academia Colombiana de Ciencias Exactas, Fisicas y Naturales, Académie Royale des Sciences d’Outre-Mer, Pakistan Academy of Sciences; Lebanese Academy of Sciences, Cuban Academy of Sciences, Pontifical Academy of Sciences, Grand challenges Canada, and Academy of Sciences of South Africa.

Hassan is the co-chair of resident of the InterAcademy Partnership (IAP), and chairman of the Council of the United Nations University (UNU). He also serves on a number of Boards of international organizations worldwide, including the Board of Trustees of Bibliotheca Alexandrina, Egypt, the Council of Science and Technology in Society (STS ) Forum, Japan, the Board of the International Science Programme, Sweden, the Board of the Science Initiative Group (SIG), USA, the International Advisory Board of the Centre for International Development (ZEF), Germany, the advisory group of the Global Young Academy.

== Awards and honours ==
Hassan is Comendador (1996) and Grand Cross (2005) of the Brazilian National Order of Scientific Merit, Officer of the Order of Merit of the Italian Republic (2003), and he is the recipient of the G77 Leadership Award and of the Abdus Salam Medal for Science and Technology.

Hassan is a Founding Fellow of the African Academy of Sciences (1985), a Fellow of The World Academy of Sciences (1985), a Fellow of the Islamic World Academy of Sciences (1992), an Honorary Member of the Academia Colombiana de Ciencias Exactas, Fisicas y Naturales (1996), and a Foreign Fellow of the Pakistan Academy of Sciences (2002). He was appointed a Foreign Member of the Royal Society in 2025.

== Personal life ==
Hassan is married with three children.

== Selected publications ==
- Hassan, Mohamed H. A. (2005). "Small Things and Big Changes in the Developing World". Science. 309 (5731). American Association for the Advancement of Science (AAAS): 65–66. doi:10.1126/science.1111138. ISSN 0036-8075. PMID 15994516. S2CID 166679567.
- Hassan, Mohamed H. A. (2001). "Can Science Save Africa?". Science. 292 (5522). American Association for the Advancement of Science (AAAS): 1609. doi:10.1126/science.292.5522.1609. ISSN 0036-8075. PMID 11387443. S2CID 36662994.
- El-Baz, Farouk; Hassan, M. H. A. (1986). Physics of desertification. Dordrecht: Springer Netherlands. ISBN 978-94-009-4388-9. OCLC 840305558.
- Hassan, Mohamed H.A. (2007). "Building Capacity in the Life Sciences in the Developing World". Cell. 131 (3). Elsevier BV: 433–436. doi:10.1016/j.cell.2007.10.020. ISSN 0092-8674. PMID 17981107. S2CID 33362062.
- Hassan, M.A. (2009). "Novel Fire Retardant Backcoatings for Textiles". In Hull, T. Richard; Kandola, Baljinder K. (eds.). Fire retardancy of polymers : new strategies and mechanisms. Cambridge: Royal Society of Chemistry. pp. 341–358. doi:10.1039/9781847559210. ISBN 978-1-84755-921-0. OCLC 319518106.

== See also ==
- Ahmed Hassan Fahal
- Sultan Hassan
- Nashwa Eassa
