= Scientific consensus on climate change =

Evaluation of climate change by the scientific community

Observed global warming: Global average temperature data from various scientific organizations show substantial agreement concerning the progress and extent of global warming: 1880– pairwise correlations for the four longer-term datasets are at least 99.29%.

There is scientific consensus that the Earth has been consistently warming since the start of the Industrial Revolution, that the rate of recent warming is largely unprecedented, and that this warming is mainly the result of a rapid increase in atmospheric carbon dioxide (CO_{2}) caused by human activities. The human activities causing this warming include fossil fuel combustion, cement production, and land use changes such as deforestation, with a significant supporting role from the other greenhouse gases such as methane and nitrous oxide. This human role in climate change is considered "unequivocal" and "incontrovertible".

Nearly all actively publishing climate scientists say humans are causing climate change. Surveys of the scientific literature are another way to measure scientific consensus. A 2019 review of scientific papers found the consensus on the cause of climate change to be at 100%, and a 2021 study concluded that over 99% of scientific papers agree on the human cause of climate change. The small percentage of papers that disagreed with the consensus often contained errors or could not be replicated.

The evidence for global warming due to human influence has been recognized by the national science academies of all the major industrialized countries. In the scientific literature, there is a very strong consensus that global surface temperatures have increased in recent decades and that the trend is caused by human-induced emissions of greenhouse gases. Scientific bodies of national and international standing confirm this view. However, some organizations with members in extractive industries hold non-committal positions, and some have tried to persuade the public that climate change is not happening, or if the climate is changing it is not because of human influence, attempting to sow doubt in the scientific consensus.

== Existence of a scientific consensus ==
Scientific consensus on causation: Academic studies of scientific agreement on human-caused global warming among climate experts (2010–2015) reflect that the level of consensus correlates with expertise in climate science. A 2019 study found scientific consensus to be at 100%, and a 2021 study concluded that consensus exceeded 99%. Another 2021 study found that 98.7% of climate experts indicated that the Earth is getting warmer mostly because of human activity.

Studies of the scientific opinion on climate change have been undertaken since the 1970s, and they have been establishing widespread consensus since the 1990s, with the level of agreement increasing over time. Individual scientists, universities, and laboratories contribute to the scientific opinion on climate change via their peer-reviewed publications, while the scientific bodies of national or international standing summarise the areas of collective agreement and relative certainty in synthesis reports.

Examples of such reports include or the 2004 Arctic Climate Impact Assessment from the International Arctic Science Committee and the governments of the Arctic Council, or the United States' National Climate Assessment, which has been released periodically since 2000 under the auspices of the United States Global Change Research Program. The fourth NCA, released in 2017, involved the efforts of thirteen federal agencies, led by the National Oceanic and Atmospheric Administration (NOAA), and around "1,000 people, including 300 leading scientists, roughly half from outside the government."

The Intergovernmental Panel on Climate Change (IPCC) had been formed by the United Nations in 1988, and it presents reports summarizing the strength and extent of consensus on climate change and its numerous aspects to the member states of the United Nations, with the major reports released at 5-to-7-year intervals starting from 1990.

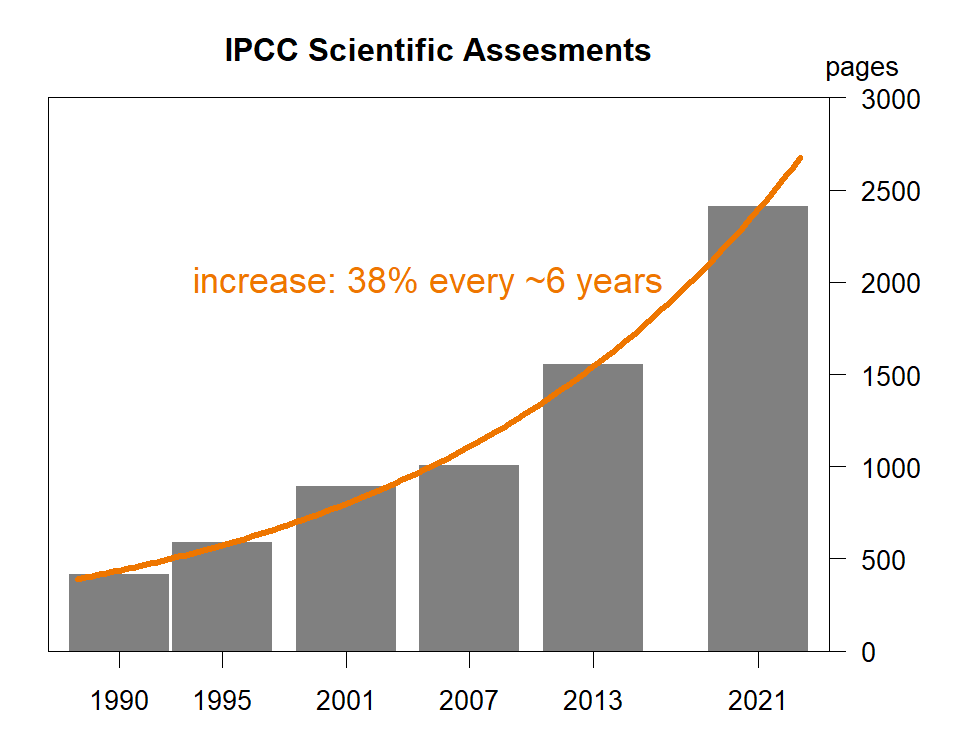
Page counts of the six IPCC Assessment Reports (1990 to 2021)

Between 1990 and 2023, the IPCC published six comprehensive assessment reports reviewing the latest climate science. The IPCC has also produced 14 special reports on particular topics. Each assessment report has four parts. These are a contribution from each of the three working groups, plus a synthesis report. The synthesis report integrates the working group contributions. It also integrates any special reports produced in that assessment cycle.

In 2001, science academies from 17 countries (Australia, Belgium, Brazil, Canada, China, France, Germany, India, Indonesia, Ireland, Italy, Malaysia, New Zealand, Sweden, Trinidad, Turkey and the United Kingdom) made a joint statement endorsing the work of IPCC. They concurred that the temperatures are rising and will continue to rise due to human activities, and also stressed the importance of cutting greenhouse gas emissions, concluding that "Business as usual is no longer a viable option". It is also notable for being one of the first statements to explicitly use the term "consensus". In 2005, another joint statement from the science academies of major countries (Brazil, Canada, China, France, Germany, India, Italy, Japan, Russia, United Kingdom and the United States) referred to the conclusions of the IPCC as "the international scientific consensus", and urged prompt action on both climate change mitigation and climate change adaptation. Elsewhere around the world, other organizations to have referred to the scientific consensus include Network of African Science Academies in 2007, and the International Union for Quaternary Research in 2008.

In 2013, a study which found that out of over 4,000 peer-reviewed papers on climate science published since 1990, 97% agree, explicitly or implicitly, that global warming is happening and is human-caused. Surveys of scientists' views on climate change – with a focus on human caused climate change – have been undertaken since the 1970s. A 2016 reanalysis confirmed that "the finding of 97% consensus [that humans are causing recent global warming] in published climate research is robust and consistent with other surveys of climate scientists and peer-reviewed studies." A 2019 study found scientific consensus to be at 100%, and a 2021 study found that consensus exceeded 99%.

== Consensus points ==
The warming influence (called radiative forcing) of long-lived atmospheric greenhouse gases has nearly doubled in 40 years

The scientific consensus regarding causes and mechanisms of climate change, its effects and what should be done about it (climate action) is that:

- It is "unequivocal" and "incontrovertible" that the greenhouse gas emissions from human activities have caused warming on land, in oceans and in the troposphere. There are no natural processes which can provide an alternate explanation.
- The atmospheric levels of carbon dioxide are the highest they have been in at least 2 million years, if not 3.2 million years. The atmospheric levels of two other major greenhouse gases, methane and nitrous oxide, are the highest they have been in at least the past 800,000 years. The record of the past 800,000 years also shows that the increases in their concentrations seen since 1750 would take millennia to be caused by natural processes.
- The decade of 2010s has been 1.1 °C (2.0 °F) warmer than the late 19th century, and the warmest since the start of a consistent instrumental temperature record. The warming of the past 50 years has occurred faster than any other warming over the past 2,000 years, if not longer.
- Precipitation appears to have been increasing since 1950, but the rainfall patterns have also been shifting, and there is more evidence for increases in heavy precipitation which causes flash floods.
- Global sea level has increased by 20–25 cm (8–10 in) since 1900, with half of that increase occurring since 1980. This sea level rise has been the fastest in "at least the last 3000 years", which is very likely to have been caused by human activity.
- As the recent warming heats the ocean, its water expands in volume. This causes half of the recent sea level rise, with the rest due to the warming melting the ice sheets and glaciers.
- While there have always been severe and extreme weather events (e.g. tropical cyclones, thunderstorms, tornados, droughts, heat waves, precipitation extremes), climate change has made many of them more severe, more frequent, or more likely to co-occur, in every part of the globe.
- The dangers of extreme weather events will continue increasing unless there is a rapid decrease in greenhouse gas emissions needed to curb further warming.
- Increased warming will lead to worse impacts.
- The extent of human-caused emissions will be the main cause of future warming.

== Statements by major scientific organizations about climate change ==
Many of the major scientific organizations about climate change have issued formal statements of opinion. The vast majority of these statements concur with the IPCC view, some very few are non-committal, or dissent from it. The California Governor's Office website lists nearly 200 worldwide scientific organizations who hold the position that climate change has been caused by human action.

== Surveys of scientists' views on climate change ==
=== 1970s ===
The Fourth National Climate Assessment ("NCA4", USGCRP, 2017) includes charts illustrating how human factors, especially accumulation in the atmosphere of greenhouse gases, are the predominant cause of observed global warming. In the 1970s, these factors were less well-understood, and some scientists thought volcanic activity would have a stronger cooling effect than what we know now.

In 1978, the National Defense University of the United States had surveyed 24 experts about the near-term climate change and its effects on agriculture. The majority of respondents had expected some warming to occur between 1970 and 2000, and described human emissions of carbon dioxide as the primary cause, but there was a disagreement on the extent, and a few had thought that an increase in volcanic activity would offset carbon dioxide emissions by elevating atmospheric sulfate concentrations (which have a reflective effect, also associated with global dimming, and with some solar geoengineering proposals) and result in overall cooling. When NDU had combined their predictions, they estimated a 10% likelihood of large (~0.6 °C (1.1 °F)) cooling occurring by 2000, a 25% likelihood of smaller cooling around 0.15 °C (0.27 °F), a 30% likelihood of limited change, with around 0.1 °C (0.18 °F) warming, a 25% likelihood of "moderate" warming of ~0.4 °C (0.72 °F), and a 10% likelihood of large warming of around 1 °C (1.8 °F). Subsequently, about 0.5 °C (0.90 °F) had occurred between 1950 and 2000, with about 0.4 °C (0.72 °F) since 1970, largely matching the survey's "moderate global warming" scenario.

=== 1980s ===
In 1989, David H. Slade had surveyed 21 climate scientists, of whom 17 had expressed "a strong belief" in "the reality of a significant climate change".

=== 1990s ===
In March 1990, Cutter Information Corporation (now known as Cutter Consortium) sent questionnaires to 1,500 researchers who were on the attendance lists of climate change conferences, and received 331 responses from 41 countries. The survey revealed widespread agreement that global warming is already happening, that it will result in negative impacts such as sea level rise, and that reducing carbon dioxide emissions and halting deforestation is an appropriate response to it. Only 1.9% of respondents predicted that there would be an overall cooling across the next 100 years. There was more disagreement on the strength of future warming: i.e. around 30% believed that there was a less than 50% chance that the warming would reach or exceed 2 °C (3.6 °F) over the next 100 years, while a larger fraction (almost 40%) thought such temperatures were at least 75% likely.

In 1991, the Center for Science, Technology, and Media sent a survey of 6 questions to around 4000 ocean and atmospheric scientists from 45 countries, and received 118 responses by January 1992, with 91% from North America. Out of those 118 scientists, 73 have either agreed or "strongly" agreed with the statement "There is little doubt among scientists that global mean temperature will increase", while 27 had disagreed and only 9 had "strongly disagreed", with the remaining 9 "neutral". 58 scientists had agreed that the effects of climate change are expected to be "substantial" by the scientific community as a whole, with 36 disagreeing and 21 staying neutral. Finally, when asked about the 1990 IPCC estimate of warming proceeding at 0.3 °F (0.17 °C) per decade throughout the 21st century under the business-as-usual climate change scenario, 13 (15%) expressed skepticism, 39 (44%) had emphasized uncertainty, and 37 (42%) had agreed. 52% thought the rate of warming would likely be lower, and 8% thought it would be higher. As of 2023, the rate of warming had been 0.2 °F (0.11 °C) or less.

In 1996, Dennis Bray and Hans von Storch, a pair of researchers at the Helmholtz Research Centre's Institute for Coastal Research, sent a questionnaire over mail to 1000 climate scientists in Germany, the United States and Canada. 40% responded, and the results subsequently published in the Bulletin of the American Meteorological Society in 1999. On a scale of 1 out of 7, where higher numbers indicated greater disagreement, "global warming is already underway" had a mean rating of 3.4, and "global warming will occur in the future" had an even greater agreement of 2.6 Surveyed scientists had less confidence in the accuracy of contemporary climate models, rating their ability to make "reasonable predictions" 10 years out at 4.8, and 5.2 for 100-year predictions: however, they consistently rejected the notion that there was too much uncertainty to justify taking immediate action, with a mean 5.6 out of 7 rating. In fact, they usually agreed there was substantial uncertainty about how strongly the impacts will affect society, and that many changes would likely be necessary to adapt.

=== 2000–2004 ===
In 2003, Bray and von Storch repeated their 1996 survey, using the same response structure with ratings on a 1–7 scale, and including all of the original questions. Further, new questions were added, which were devoted to climate change adaptation and media coverage of climate change. This second survey received 530 responses from 27 different countries, but it has been strongly criticized on the grounds that it was performed on the web with no means to verify that the respondents were climate scientists or to prevent multiple submissions. While the survey required entry of a username and password, its critics alleged that both were circulated to non-scientists, including to a climate change denial mailing list. Bray and von Storch defended their results, claiming that a statistical analysis with a Kolmogorov-Smirnov test and a Wald–Wolfowitz runs test revealed no significant irregularities.

In general, the second survey had demonstrated an increase in scientific confidence relative to the first. One of the greatest increases was for the statement "We can say for certain that global warming is a process already underway", where 1 represented strong agreement and 7 strong disagreement: the mean response went from 3.39 to 2.41. In response to the question, "To what extent do you agree or disagree that climate change is mostly the result of anthropogenic causes?", it went from 4.17 to 3.62. Notably, the percentage of respondents "strongly disagreeing" stayed the same, at 10%, and a similar percentage stayed neutral (14% in 1996 and 13% in 2003): yet, the overall split went from 41% agreement and 45% disagreement in 1996 to 56% agreement and 30% disagreement in 2003, as there was both a substantial increase in agreement and a decline percentage of those disagreeing less strongly. Similarly, there was a 72% to 20% split in favour of describing the IPCC reports as accurate, and a 15% to 80% rejection of the thesis that "there is enough uncertainty about the phenomenon of global warming that there is no need for immediate policy decisions."

In 2004, the geologist and historian of science Naomi Oreskes analyzed the abstracts of 928 scientific papers on "global climate change" published between 1993 and 2003. 75% had either explicitly expressed support for the scientific consensus on anthropogenic climate change, or had accepted it as a given and were focused on evaluating its impacts or proposing approaches for climate change mitigation, while the remaining 25% were devoted to methods of current climate change research or paleoclimate analysis. No abstract had explicitly rejected the scientific consensus.

=== 2005–2009 ===
Combined result of surveys through 2011.

In 2007, Harris Interactive surveyed 489 randomly selected members of either the American Meteorological Society or the American Geophysical Union for the Statistical Assessment Service (STATS) at George Mason University, publishing the results in April 2008. 97% of the scientists surveyed agreed that global temperatures had increased during the past 100 years, and only 5% believed that human activity does not contribute to greenhouse warming. 84% said they personally believed human-induced warming was occurring, and 74% agreed that "currently available scientific evidence" substantiated its occurrence. 56% described the study of global climate change as a mature science and 39% as an emerging science. When asked about the likely severity of effects of climate change over the next 50–100 years, 41% said they could be described as catastrophic; 44% thought the effects would be moderately dangerous while about 13% thought there was relatively little danger.

The third Bray and von Storch survey was also conducted in 2008, with the results published in 2010. It used the same methodology as their two previous surveys, with a similar number of sections and also asking to rate responses on a 1-to-7 scale (i.e. from 'not at all' to 'very much'), but it had also introduced web links with respondent-specific unique identifiers to eliminate multiple responses. 2058 climate scientists from 34 countries were surveyed, and a total of 373 responses were received (response rate of 18.2%).

To the question "How convinced are you that climate change, whether natural or anthropogenic, is occurring now?", 67.1% said they very much agreed (7), 26.7% agreed to some large extent (6), 6.2% said to they agreed to some small extent (2–4), none said they did not agree at all. To the question "How convinced are you that most of recent or near future climate change is, or will be, a result of anthropogenic causes?" the responses were 34.6% very much agree, 48.9% agreeing to a large extent, 15.1% to a small extent, and 1.35% not agreeing at all. Similarly, 34.6% had very much agreed that climate change "poses a very serious and dangerous threat to humanity" and 27.6% agreed to a large extent, while only 1.1% did not agree at all.

At the same time, the respondents had strongly rejected the concept of intentionally presenting the most extreme possibilities in the hope of mobilizing the public, with around 73% disagreeing (1–3), 12.5% unsure and 14.5% agreeing in any way (5–7). Only 1.6% had agreed very much, while 27.2% did not agree at all, even as they overwhelmingly agreed (84% vs. 4%) that the scientists who do this are the most likely to be listened to by journalists. The respondents have generally expressed high confidence in the IPCC reports, with 63.5% agreeing that they estimated the impacts of temperature change exactly right (4 on the scale), and only 1.4% responding that they had strongly underestimated and 2.5% that they had strongly overestimated those impacts (1 and 7 on a scale.) On sea level rise, 51.4% thought the reports were exactly right, and only about 16% thought it was overestimated in any way (5–7), while the remaining third believed it was underestimated (1–3). Subsequent IPCC reports had been forced to regularly increase their estimates of future sea level rise, largely in response to newer research on the ice sheets of Greenland and Antarctica.

In 2009, Peter Doran and Maggie Kendall Zimmerman at University of Illinois at Chicago polled 10,257 earth scientists from various specialities and received replies from 3,146. 79 respondents were climatologists who had published over half of their peer-reviewed research on the subject of climate change, and 76 of them agreed that mean global temperatures had risen compared to pre-1800s levels, with 75 describing human activity as a significant factor. Among all respondents, 90% agreed that temperatures have risen compared to pre-1800 levels, and 82% agreed that humans significantly influence the global temperature. Economic geologists and meteorologists were among the biggest doubters, with only 47 percent and 64 percent, respectively, believing in significant human involvement. In summary, Doran and Zimmerman wrote:

It seems that the debate on the authenticity of global warming and the role played by human activity is largely nonexistent among those who understand the nuances and scientific basis of long-term climate processes.

=== 2010–2014 ===
A 2010 paper in the Proceedings of the National Academy of Sciences of the United States of America reviewed publication and citation data for 1,372 climate researchers, 908 of whom had authored 20 or more publications on climate, and found that

(i) 97–98% of the climate researchers most actively publishing in the field support the tenets of ACC (Anthropogenic Climate Change) outlined by the Intergovernmental Panel on Climate Change, and (ii) the relative climate expertise and scientific prominence of the researchers unconvinced of ACC are substantially below that of the convinced researchers.

In October 2011, researchers from George Mason University analyzed the results of a survey of 998 actively working scientists from the American Geophysical Union, the American Meteorological Society, or listed in the 23rd edition of American Men and Women of Science, 489 of whom had returned completed questionnaires. 97% of respondents had agreed that global temperatures have risen over the past century. 84% agreed that "human-induced greenhouse warming is now occurring," 5% disagreed, and 12% didn't know. When asked what they regard as "the likely effects of global climate change in the next 50 to 100 years," on a scale of 1 to 10, from Trivial to Catastrophic: 13% of respondents replied 1 to 3 (trivial/mild), 44% replied 4 to 7 (moderate), 41% replied 8 to 10 (severe/catastrophic), and 2% didn't know.

In 2012, James L. Powell, a former member of the National Science Board, analyzed published research on global warming and climate change between 1991 and 2012 and found that of the 13,950 articles in peer-reviewed journals, only 24 (<0.2%) rejected anthropogenic global warming. This was a follow-up to an analysis looking at 2,258 peer-reviewed articles published between November 2012 and December 2013, which revealed that only one of the 9,136 authors rejected anthropogenic global warming.

Dennis Bray and Hans von Storch had conducted their fourth survey in 2013, publishing its results the following year. 283 scientists had responded: 185 (65.4%) had been working in climate science for over 15 years, and only 19 (6.7%) had 0 to 5 years of experience. It had the same methodology as the third survey, ranking responses on a 1-to-7 scale and similar responses to the same questions: i.e., when asked, "How convinced are you that climate change, whether natural or anthropogenic, is occurring now?", 74.7% said they very much agreed (7), 2.9% were "neutral" (4), and only 2.1% were 1–3 on the scale. To the question "How convinced are you that most of recent or near future climate change is, or will be, a result of anthropogenic causes?", 43% had very much agreed, 28.5% agreeing to a large extent (6), 16.6% to a small extent (2–4), and 2.5% did not agree at all (1). 41.8% had very much agreed that climate change "poses a very serious and dangerous threat to humanity" and 23.2% agreed to a large extent, while 3.5% did not agree at all. A new question asked respondents to attribute a percentage of recent warming to anthropogenic causes: 73.3% of scientists attributed 70–100%, while only 1.5% said there was zero human role.

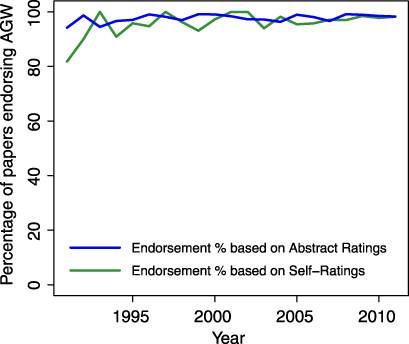
In 2013, it had been quantified that the vast majority of published scientific literature had agreed with the human role in climate change since the 1990s.

In 2013, John Cook examined 11,944 abstracts from the peer-reviewed scientific literature from 1991 to 2011 that matched the topics 'global climate change' or 'global warming'. He and his co-authors found that, while 66.4% of them expressed no position on anthropogenic global warming (AGW), of those that did, 97.1% endorsed the consensus position that humans are contributing to global warming. They also invited authors to rate their own papers and found that, while 35.5% rated their paper as expressing no position on AGW (known to be expected in a consensus situation) 97.2% of the rest endorsed the consensus. In both cases the percentage of endorsements among papers expressing a position was marginally increasing over time. They concluded that the number of papers actually rejecting the consensus on AGW is a vanishingly small proportion of the published research, and that "the fundamental science of AGW is no longer controversial among the publishing science community and the remaining debate in the field has moved on to other topics."

In contrast to earlier work which surveyed the opinions of researchers, Cook et al.'s 2013 study measured the consensus by rating and counting published papers. Economist Richard Tol criticized the methodology, saying it had been executed without controls and measurements of rater reliability. Cook and other researchers wrote that the results from the 2013 paper were consistent with other studies published before and since.

In 2014, researchers from the Netherlands Environmental Assessment Agency surveyed 1,868 climate scientists. They found that, consistent with other research, the level of agreement on anthropogenic causation correlated with expertise – 90% of those surveyed with more than 10 peer-reviewed papers related to climate (just under half of survey respondents) explicitly agreed that greenhouse gases were the main cause of global warming. They included researchers on mitigation and adaptation in their surveys in addition to physical climate scientists, leading to a slightly lower level of consensus compared to previous studies.

=== 2015–2019 ===
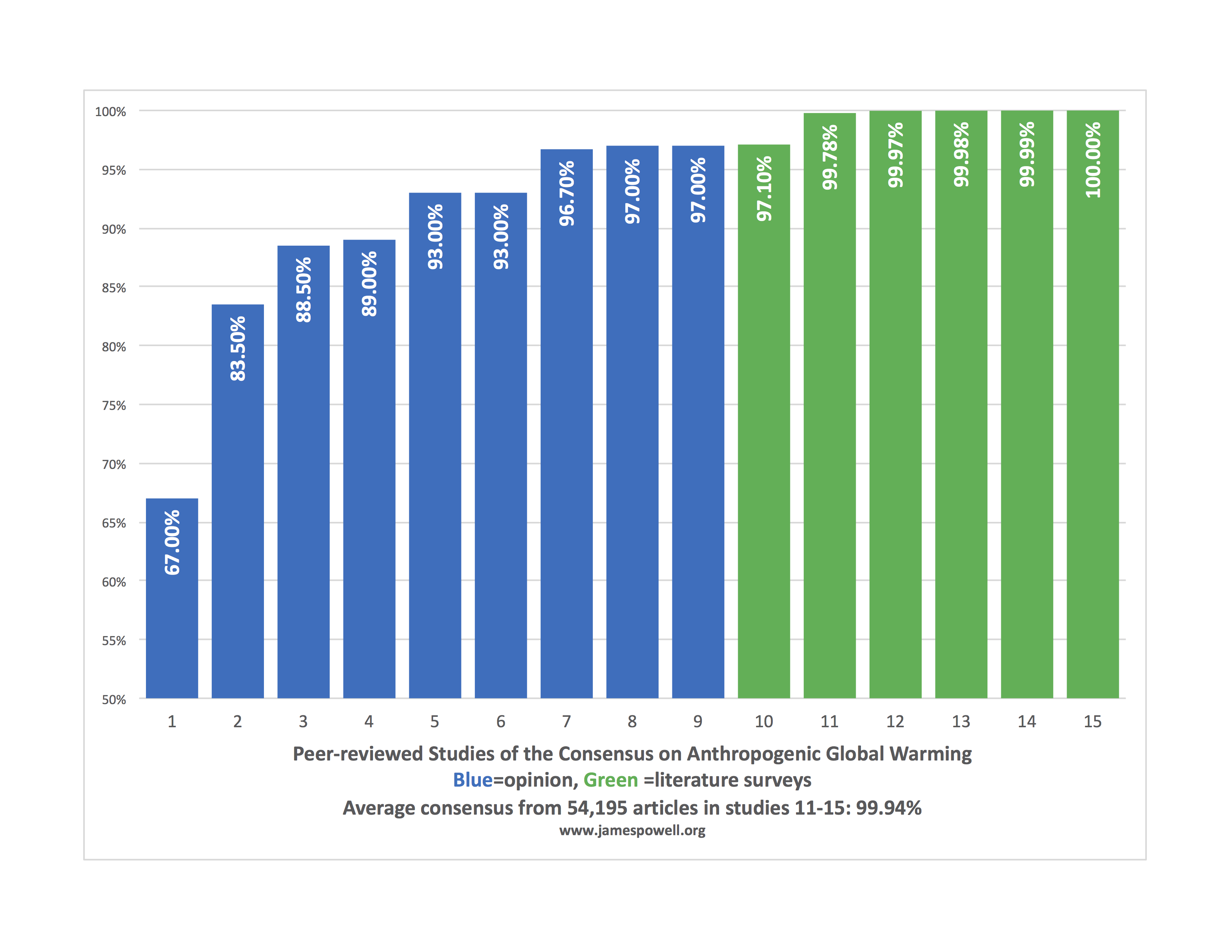
The consensus on anthropogenic global warming among the peer-reviewed studies published between 1991 and 2015.

A 2016 study titled Learning from mistakes in climate research followed up on John Cook's 2013 paper by examining the quality of the 3% of peer-reviewed papers which had rejected the consensus view. They discovered that "replication reveals a number of methodological flaws, and a pattern of common mistakes emerges that is not visible when looking at single isolated cases".

The 5th International Survey of Climate Scientists by Dennis Bray and Hans von Storch took place over December 2015 and January 2016. Unlike the past surveys, the scientists were no longer questioned on their opinion of the IPCC, and there was much more focus on extreme event attribution. In other ways, it had replicated the methodology of the previous surveys, with most responses ranked on a 1-to-7 scale. There were over 600 complete responses: 291 (45.2%) had been working in climate science for over 15 years, while 79 (12.3%) had 0 to 5 years of experience. When asked "How convinced are you that climate change, whether natural or anthropogenic, is occurring now?", 79.3% said they very much agreed (7), 1.2% were "neutral" (4), and only 2.1% were 1–3 on the scale. To the question "How convinced are you that most of recent or near future climate change is, or will be, a result of anthropogenic causes?", 47.7% had very much agreed, 26% agreeing to a large extent (6), 9.8% to a small extent (2–4), and 1.9% did not agree at all (1). 46% had very much agreed that climate change "poses a very serious and dangerous threat to humanity" and 26% agreed to a large extent, while 2.2% did not agree at all. 75.8% said that the level of uncertainty in climate science had decreased since 1996, while 13.6% said it had increased. 75.7% said that the level of risk associated with climate change had increased considerably since 1996, while 5% said it had decreased.

In 2017, James L. Powell analyzed five surveys of the peer-reviewed literature from 1991 to 2015, and found that they amounted to a combined 54,195 articles, few of which had outright rejected anthropogenic climate change, resulting in an average consensus of 99.94%. In November 2019, his survey of over 11,600 peer-reviewed articles published in the first seven months of 2019 showed that the consensus had reached 100%.

=== 2020s ===
The public substantially underestimates the degree of scientific consensus that humans are causing climate change. Studies from 2019 to 2021 found scientific consensus to range from 98.7–100%.

In a 2024 survey, 76.3% of responding IPCC lead authors and review editors projected at least 2.5 °C of global warming by 2100; only 5.79% forecast warming of 1.5 °C or less. Separately, then-current climate policies indicate the world will have warmed by about 2.7 °C.

In 2021, Krista Myers led a paper which surveyed 2,780 Earth scientists. Depending on expertise, between 91% (all scientists) to 100% (climate scientists with high levels of expertise, 20+ papers published) agreed human activity is causing climate change. Among the total group of climate scientists, 98.7% agreed. The agreement was lowest among scientists who chose Economic Geology as one of their fields of research (84%).

Also in 2021, a team led by Mark Lynas had found 80,000 climate-related studies published between 2012 and 2020, and chose to analyse a random subset of 3,000. Four of these were skeptical of the human cause of climate change, 845 were endorsing the human cause perspective at different levels, and 1869 were indifferent to the question. The authors estimated the proportion of papers not skeptical of the human cause as 99.85% (95% confidence limit 99.62%–99.96%). Excluding papers which took no position on the human cause led to an estimate of the proportion of consensus papers as 99.53% (95% confidence limit 98.80%–99.87%). They confirmed their numbers by explicitly looking for alternative hypotheses in the entire dataset, which resulted in 28 papers.

== See also ==
- Climate change denial
- History of climate change science
- List of climate change controversies
- List of climate scientists
- World Scientists' Warning to Humanity
