= Royal Academies for Science and the Arts of Belgium =

Non-governmental national academy (2001-present)

The Royal Academies for Science and the Arts of Belgium (RASAB) is a non-governmental association that promotes and organises science and the arts in Belgium by coordinating the national and international activities of its constituent academies such as the National Scientific Committees and the representation of Belgium in international scientific organisations.

The RASAB was formed as a non-profit organization (Association without lucrative purpose) in 2001 by the Dutch-speaking academy KVAB (Koninklijke Vlaamse Academie van België voor Wetenschappen en Kunsten i.e. Royal Flemish Academy of Belgium for Science and the Arts) and by the French-speaking academy ARB (Académie royale des sciences, des lettres et des beaux-arts de Belgique i.e. The Royal Academy of Science, Letters and Fine Arts of Belgium).

The association is headquartered in the buildings of the former Royal Stables at the Academy Palace, Rue Ducale/Hertogstraat 1, 1000 Brussels.

== History ==
=== Academies ===
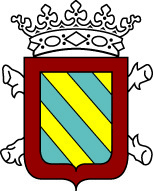
ARB

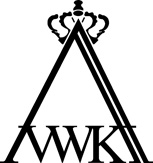
KVAB

The RASAB was founded in 2001 by the two Belgian academies that are connected through their working language either to the Flemish community or to the French community of Belgium as a collaborative association with the aim of promoting the science and the arts on a national and international level in Belgium. To meet this demand, the academies organise scientific and cultural activities, they try to stimulate cooperation between universities in Belgium, they assure Belgian representation in international organisations and forums, they attract foreign researchers, they give recommendations and advice to institutions involved in government, industry, education and research, and they give prizes to talented researchers and artists.

The Belgian academies are successor institutions to the Imperial and Royal Academy of Brussels established in 1772 by Georg Adam, Prince of Starhemberg, minister plenipotentiary of the Austrian Netherlands during the reign of Habsburg Empress Maria Theresa.

=== RASAB ===
The RASAB was founded in 2001 in order to coordinate the national and international activities for which the Académie royale des Sciences, des Lettres et des Beaux- Arts de Belgique (ARB) and the Koninklijke Vlaamse Academie van België voor Wetenschappen en Kunsten (KVAB) have a mutual responsibility.

== Mission and goals ==
The RASAB has the following responsibilities and duties:

- to coordinate and, if necessary, create national deliberative assemblies, such as the National Committees;
- to pay the memberships to international institutions where both Academies are members of;
- to provide funds to make sure that Belgian representatives are present at the General Assemblies and other meetings of these international institutions, because presence is required due to the membership of Belgium in these organisations;
- to provide Belgian representation in those scientific, artistic and cultural international organisations where KVAB and ARB are members of and which accept only one representative from each country;
- to improve the international cooperation between individual scientists by reimbursing travel- and accommodation costs;
- to fulfil assignments where both academies are responsible for.

The articles of the RASAB were published in the Belgian Official Journal from the 19th of April 2001. The association is headquartered in the former stables of the Palace of Academies in Brussels, nearby the Royal Palace and the Warandepark.

== National scientific committees ==
The assignment of the National Committees is the promotion and coordination for Belgium of the studies of different scientific disciplines that are within their competences, mainly from an international point of view. Each National Committee focuses on a specific scientific study. There are 24 committees. Members of these committees are doctors, professors and people working within a specific scientific field.

The conditions for the foundation of a National Committee is the existence of an international scientific union that is a member of the International Council for Science or a member of a scientific institution of the International Council for Science (scientific committees, special committees,...) in the same scientific discipline.

The RASAB is responsible for the financial and logistic support of the National Committees, as well for its daily activities, as for the organisation of scientific events by the National Committees in the Palace of Academies.

== International relations ==
=== ALLEA ===
All European Academies (ALLEA) is the European Federation of National Academies of Sciences and Humanities. Currently, there are 53 Academies from 40 European countries in this federation.

ALLEA Member Academies are self-governing communities of scientists and researchers, and operate as learned societies, think-tanks, grant givers, and research performing organisations.

The goals of ALLEA are:

- promotes the exchange of information and experiences between its Member Academies;
- offers European science and society advice from its Member Academies;
- strives for excellence in science and scholarship, for high ethical standards in the conduct of research, and for independence from political, commercial and ideological interests.

=== EASAC ===
The European Academies' Science Advisory Council (EASAC) is formed by the National Academies of the European Union's Member States.

EASAC provides a cooperation between the Academies with the aim of providing scientific advice to the European policy makers. In that way, EASAC makes it possible for the European scientists to be heard as one voice.

In this way, EASAC has the opportunity to fulfil the vision of the Academies, namely that science plays a key role in many aspects of modern life and the recognition of this scientific aspect is a prerequisite for wise political decisions. This vision is part of the foundation of many National Academies. Given the increasing role of the European Union in the political arena, the National Academies acknowledge that the scope of their advisory tasks must exceed the national borders and that it's important not to lose sight of the European level.

Since April 2010, the official contact for EASAC in Brussels is the RASAB's liaison office. There is an intense cooperation between the RASAB and the secretariat and board of EASAC.

==== RASAB's liaison office ====
The Belgian Academies have the advantage of being located in the heart of Brussels, at walking distance from the European institutions. Given the context a liaison office was founded within the RASAB, which makes sure that the advice from the Belgian as well as the European academies are heard by the European policy makers.

The office has the following responsibilities and duties:

- to gather information on the upcoming EU policy measures, which may benefit from an independent scientific and technical guidance.
- to increase the visibility of the Belgian and European Academies and its global umbrella organisations as a source of independent, peer-reviewed and scientific information of high quality to develop policy measures.
- to establish a more regular contact with key figures in the European Commission, the Parliament and the Council, who show an interest in science and technique as an input for policy preparations.
- to organise meetings between key figures of the Academies with those from the European Institutions.

=== IAP ===
InterAcademy Panel (IAP) is a worldwide network of National Academies of Science. The Panel was founded in 1993.

The main objective is to promote the cooperation between its Member Academies and to give advice to its citizens and their governments when it comes to scientific aspects of worldwide concerns.

IAP especially focuses on helping out the smaller and younger Academies to obtain these objectives. All Academies will be more efficient when it comes to increasing their influence and spreading their advice and warnings amongst their citizens and politicians through communication connections and networks created by the IAP-activities.

=== I.H.R Network ===
De International Human Rights Network (IHR) of Academies and Scholarly Societies helps scientists, engineers and physicians all over the world who are victims of severe repression, just because of the nonviolent use of their rights as described in the Universal Declaration of Human Rights.

IHR also supports the awareness of the human rights and institutional commitment to the human rights in het national academies and the scientific communities worldwide.

=== UAI ===
De Union Académique Internationale (UAI, The International Union of Academies) is an organisation of many national academies from more than 60 countries and several international academies.

The UAI works to promote the advancement of knowledge, development of scientific exchanges and initiatives of its academies. The increasing number of projects, by its willingness to accommodate more members of academies, the International Academic Union and aims to represent the principle of excellence that animates it.
