= Sultan Hassan (astrophysicist) =

Sudanese computational astrophysicist

- سلطان حسن
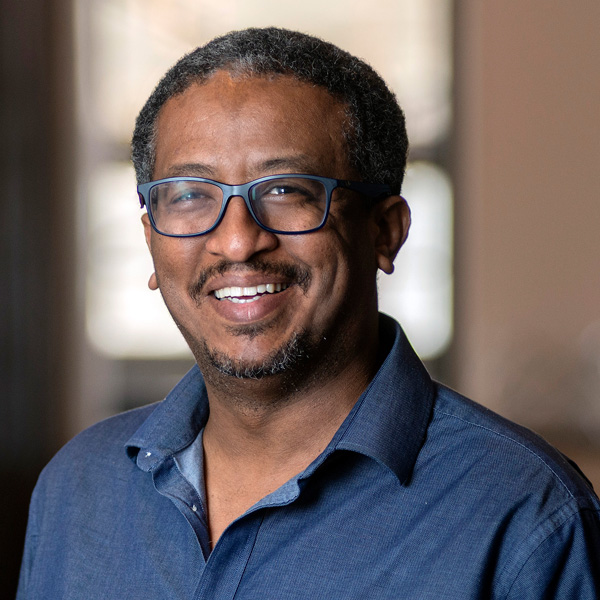
- Education: University of Khartoum (BSc); University of Cape Town (MSc); University of the Western Cape (PhD)
- Scientific career
- Fields: Computational Astrophysics; Cosmology; Machine Learning; Bayesian
- Institutions: New Mexico State University; New York University
- Thesis: Simulating the neutral hydrogen distribution during cosmic reionization (2018)

Sultan Hassan (Arabic: سلطان حسن) is a Sudanese computational astrophysicist and NASA Hubble Fellow.

Hassan was born in Saudi Arabia. In 2009, he received a BSc in Physics from the University of Khartoum, Sudan. In 2013, he received an MSc in Astrophysics & Space Science from the University of Cape Town, South Africa, and a PhD from the University of the Western Cape, South Africa. During his PhD studies, Hassan became a visiting fellow at the Max Planck Institute for Astrophysics until 2017. In 2018, he became a Square Kilometre Array Postdoctoral Fellow at the University of Western Cape, followed by a Tombaugh Postdoctoral Fellow at New Mexico State University from 2018 to 2020. In September 2020, he became Flatiron Research Fellow at the Flatiron Institute. In 2022, Hassan was selected for NASA Hubble Fellowship Program as a Hubble Fellow hosted at New York University.

Hassan specialises in computational astrophysics, focusing on large-scale galaxy formation and high-resolution radiative-transfer simulations coupled with machine learning and Bayesian inference techniques for multimodal information extraction and understanding of how the Intergalactic and Circumgalactic media both had evolved from Cosmic Dawn.

== Selected publications ==
- Hassan S, Davé R, Finlator K, Santos MG. Simulating the 21 cm signal from reionization including non-linear ionizations and inhomogeneous recombinations. Monthly Notices of the Royal Astronomical Society 2016;457:1550–67.
- Hassan S, Davé R, Mitra S, Finlator K, Ciardi B, Santos MG. Constraining the contribution of active galactic nuclei to reionization. Monthly Notices of the Royal Astronomical Society 2018;473:227–40.
- Hassan S, Andrianomena S, Doughty C. Constraining the astrophysics and cosmology from 21 cm tomography using deep learning with the SKA. Monthly Notices of the Royal Astronomical Society 2020;494:5761–74.
- Francisco Villaescusa-Navarro F, Daniel Anglés-Alcázar, Shy Genel, David N Spergel, Rachel S Somerville, Romeel Dave, Annalisa Pillepich, Lars Hernquist, Dylan Nelson, Paul Torrey, Desika Narayanan, Yin Li, Oliver Philcox, Valentina La Torre, Ana Maria Delgado, Shirley Ho, Sultan Hassan, Blakesley Burkhart, Digvijay Wadekar, Nicholas Battaglia, Gabriella Contardo, Greg L Bryan. The CAMELS Project: Cosmology and Astrophysics with Machine-learning Simulations. The Astrophysical Journal. 2021; 915:71.

== See also ==
- Mohamed H.A. Hassan
- Nashwa Eassa
