= Suad Sulaiman =

Sudanese parasitologist

Suad Sulieman
- Citizenship: Sudan
- Education: University of Khartoum, London School of Hygiene & Tropical Medicine
- Occupation: parasitologist
- Employer: Sudanese National Academy of Sciences
- Awards: Member of the Sudanese National Academy of Sciences

Suad Sulieman (Arabic: سعاد سليمان, romanized: Suʻād Sulaymān) is a Sudanese parasitologist that has authored numerous publications within her specialized field. She actively participates in addressing various health concerns as a member of the Sudanese National Academy of Sciences (SNAS). Suad holds the role of treasurer at the Sudanese National Academy of Sciences, founded in August 2005 by a collective of Sudanese scientists.

== Academic career ==
She served as Assistant Dean for Academic Affairs at Nile College and as a professor and research supervisor in the Ministry of Science and Innovation. She also worked as a research scientist and head of the Tropical Medicine Research Institute at the National Research Centre and National Public Health Laboratories. She later worked as an independent consultant in health and environment matters.

She showed morals in research, research philosophy, execution research, community medication, and clinical parasitology to under-and post-graduate college understudies.

Prof. Suad was VP of Sudanese Climate Protection Society, and individual from board of National Bio safety advisory committee, Higher Gathering for Climate. She sat on the National steering committee of the Nile basin discourse, Sudan forum, and was Counsel on Health Exploration, UNESCO Seat for Women in Science and Innovation, Sudan.

She is currently member of executive committee of the Sudanese National Academy of Sciences, and is Research Director, Sudan Medical Heritage Foundation. She serves on the Board of Trustees of the Haggar Charity Foundation, Khartoum.
