= Brian Norton (engineer) =

Irish engineer, President of Dublin Institute of Technology 2003-2018

- Born: 1955 (age 70–71); Great Yarmouth, United Kingdom
- Education: University of Nottingham; Cranfield University
- Scientific career
- Fields: Energy Engineering; Physics; Solar Energy
- Workplaces: Tyndall National Institute; University College Cork; Technological University Dublin Dublin Institute of Technology; Ulster University; Cranfield University

Brian Norton is a solar energy applications researcher and technologist. As president of Dublin Institute of Technology (DIT) from 2003 to 2018, he was an advocate for diversity of higher education in Ireland. He has also been associated with the relocation of DIT from a multiplicity of scattered buildings to a single city centre campus in the Grangegorman neighbourhood of Dublin and the creation of the Technological University Dublin, Ireland's first Technological University.

In 2020 he became head of energy research at Tyndall National Institute, research professor at University College Cork as well as professor of solar energy applications at Technological University Dublin.

== Biography ==
In 1989 Norton was appointed by Sir Derek Birley as the first professor in the field of the Built Environment at the University of Ulster, prior to which he taught at Cranfield University. He is a member of the Royal Irish Academy and a fellow of the Irish Academy of Engineering. Norton studied physics at the University of Nottingham and engineering at Cranfield University and holds doctorates from both universities. He has been conferred with an honorary doctorate by the University of Technology of Troyes. His most-cited research papers are on improving photovoltaic module efficiency via use of various types of heat sink that enable operation closer to ambient temperatures. He co-chaired, with Wim van Saarloos, the European Academies' Science Advisory Council (EASAC) activity that led to a 2021 report on "Decarbonisation of Buildings".

== Selected bibliography ==
- Harnessing Solar Heat, Springer, 2013
- Solar Energy Thermal Technology. Springer, 1992
- "Industrial and Agricultural Applications of Solar Energy". In Comprehensive Renewable Energy, Elsevier, 2012 (winner of a 2012 PROSE Awards of the Association of American Publishers for best multi-volume reference work)
- "Solar Energy Collectors and their applications". In Solar Energy Science and Engineering Applications. CRC Press, 2013
- "The Shadows Cast by Inadequate Energy Governance: Why more Sun does not necessarily mean more photovoltaic electricity". Norton contributed with Sarah McCormack of Trinity College Dublin, to Renewable Energy Governance: Challenges and Insecurities. Springer, 2013
- "Solar Power and the Enabling Role of Nanotechnology", Norton contributed with Ali Shakouri and Helen McNally, both of Purdue University to Understanding the Global Energy Crisis, Purdue University Press, 2014.
- "Low temperature solar thermal applications". Norton contributed with Hans Martin Henning of Fraunhofer Institute for Solar Energy Systems ISE and Daniel Mugnier of Tecsol, Vice-chair of the IEA Solar Heating and Cooling Programme to Solar Energy. World Scientific Press, 2016
