= InterAmerican Network of Academies of Sciences =

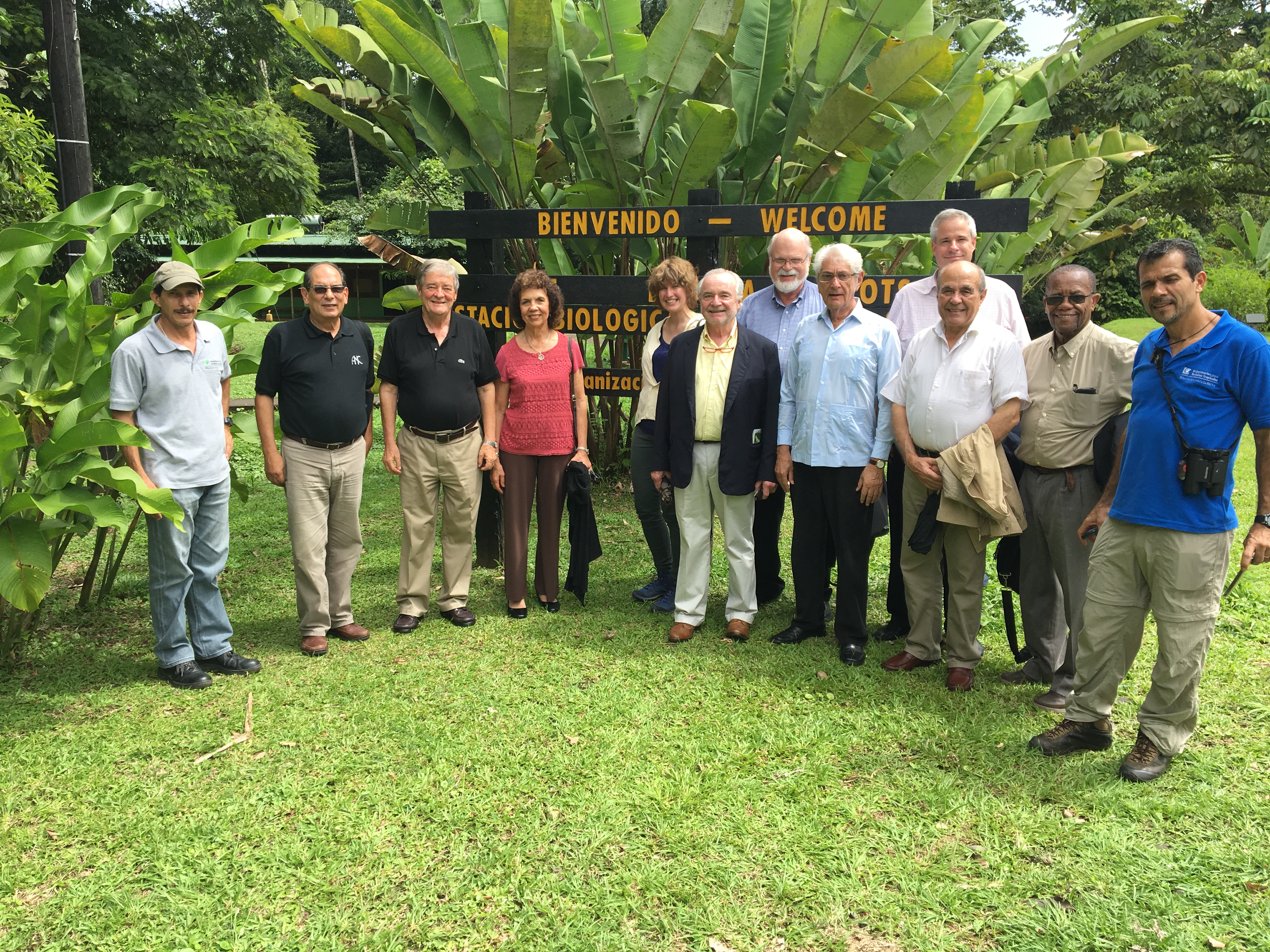
- Members of the IANAS Executive Committee visiting the La Selva Biological Station in Costa Rica during the 2017 EC Meeting
- Established: 2004
- Co-chairs: Juan Asenjo and Jeremy McNeil
- Website: www.ianas.org

The InterAmerican Network of Academies of Sciences (IANAS) is a regional network made up of National Academy of Sciences from the nations in the Americas. It was founded in 2004 as an organization utilizing science diplomacy to "build scientific and technological capacities and strengthen relationships among the countries of the Americas as a tool for societal development." The creation of the organization was in part inspired by the InterAcademy Panel (IAP), to function as a regional network in the manner of the Network of African Science Academies (previously founded with help from the IAP). Support also came from the Organization of American States and the Inter-American Development Bank for the creation of IANAS. The IAP continues to be its principal source of financial support. Current co-chairs are Helena B. Nader, President of the Brazilian Academy of Sciences and Karen B. Strier, member of the U.S. National Academy of Sciences.

== Mission ==
The purpose of the network is to connect and develop the scientific community and institutions in each country, and thus to contribute to sustainable development and help build research capacity . Its main objectives are:

1. "To help improve national scientific capacities, especially as a tool for societal development. This is to be accomplished by strengthening relationships in science and technology among the countries of the Americas.

2. To assist member Academies in building their internal capacity, by creating a forum for the exchange of information and experience.

3. To promote the creation of new Academies in interested countries of the Americas.

4. To contribute to the scientific decision-making processes in the Americas, "with the goal of promoting prosperity and equity in the hemisphere."

== Programs ==
IANAS organizes its efforts through programs focused on six key issues : Water, Energy, Science Education, Women for Science, Capacity Building, and Food Security. Each program has a leadership team, and carries out its own activities . Generally each program collects experts from different countries to prepare documents for policy makers in the Americas, often in collaboration with organizations such as UNESCO and the IAP The Network also conducts multi-national surveys, for instance to assist in a study investigating the presence of women in national academies.
