= IAP statement on population growth =

The InterAcademy Panel Statement on Population Growth is an international scientist consensus document discussing and demanding a halt of the population expansion. This was the first worldwide joint statement of academies of sciences, and their cooperative InterAcademy Panel on International Issues. It was signed by 58 member academies.

== Background ==
Between October 24 and October 27, 1993, an international "scientist's top summit" was held in New Delhi, India, with representatives from academies of sciences from all over the world. This grew out of two previous meetings, one joint meeting by the British Royal Society and the United States National Academy of Sciences, and one international meeting organised by the Royal Swedish Academy of Sciences. The scientists discussed the environmental and social welfare problems for the world population, and found them closely linked to the population expansion.

In the year 1950, there were approximately 2.5 billion (2,500 million) humans alive in this world. By 1960, the number had reached 3 billion, and by 1975 was at 4 billion. The 5 billion mark was reached around 1987, and in 1993, at the New Delhi meeting, academics estimated the population to be 5.5 billion. For some time, world food production had been able to roughly match population growth, meaning that starvation was a regional and distributional problem, rather than one based on a total shortage of food. The scientists noted that increased food production on land and on sea in the previous decade was less than the population increase over the same period. Moreover, by increased food production and otherwise, the population growth was contributing to a loss of biodiversity, deforestation and loss of topsoil, and shortages of water and fuel. The academics noted that the complex relationships between population size and various environmental effects were not fully understood, but that "there is no doubt that the threat to the ecosystem is linked to population size and resource use". They were aware of the problems with increasing greenhouse emissions and other environmental threats, and found these linked to the population growth.

The scientists decided to adopt a resolution on the problems and on the means to solve them, and that this resolution should be put to vote by the respective national academies of science. In 1993, they also established the InterAcademy Panel, in order to coordinate this and future similar consensus resolutions on important global issues.

== Statement summary ==
The academies note that "the world is undergoing an unprecedented population expansion", and that it is necessary to stop it. In fact, we must reach "zero population growth within the lifetime of our children", if we are to achieve the "common goal", which was defined as "the improvement of the quality of life for all, both now and succeeding generations", including "social, economic and personal well-being while preserving fundamental human rights and the ability to live harmoniously in a protected environment".

Moreover, these goals are achievable, but in order to achieve them it is not sufficient to halt the population expansion. At the same time, a number of actions need to be taken, in order to improve health and welfare, and lessen the negative human impact on the environment. Finally, more research in these areas is needed.

The proposed actions are codified in 21 points. Those directly dealing with halting the population growth include furthering equal opportunities for women, easy access to cheap and safe contraceptives, family planning programmes, broad primary health care and education, and increased research on cultural, religious, and other factors, which "affect reproductive behavior". In accordance with the respect for fundamental human rights, the measures do not include any kind of coercion, but enabling and encouragement for choosing to limit the number of children in a family.

Other points include governmental policies recognizing longer-term environmental responsibilities; assistance from the industrialised to the developing world for environmental problems; pricing and taxing that take environmental cost into account, and thus influence consumer behaviour, and transitions to less energy consumptive economies.
