= Muntaser Ibrahim =

Sudanese geneticist (born 1957)

Professor Muntaser Ibrahim
- منتصر الطيب إبراهيم
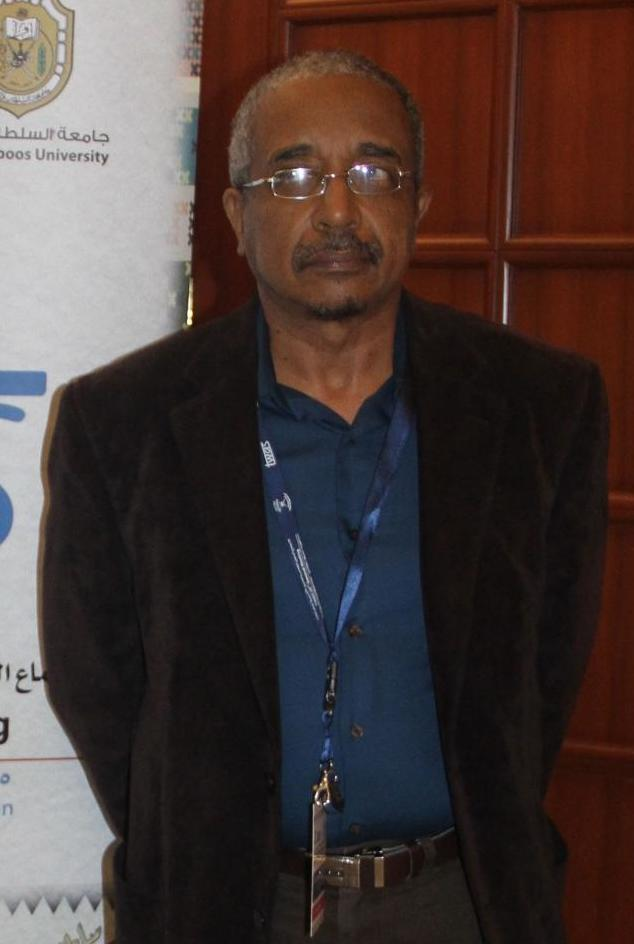
- Born: June 17, 1957 (age 68); Omdurman, Sudan
- Education: B.Sc. (1980), M.Sc. (1987), Ph.D. (1994)
- Alma mater: Zagazig University, Egypt; University of Khartoum; University of Copenhagen, Denmark
- Awards: C.N.R. Rao Prize for Scientific Research (2014)
- Scientific career
- Fields: Human genetics, disease genetics
- Institutions: University of Khartoum, Sudan

Muntaser Eltayeb Ibrahim (Arabic: منتصر الطيب إبراهيم, born June 17, 1957) is a Sudanese geneticist and professor of molecular biology at the University of Khartoum, where he leads its Institute of Endemic Diseases. Science described him as "one of Sudan's most distinguished living scholars". His research focuses on human genetic diversity in Africa, human genetic variation contributing to susceptibility to infectious diseases such as malaria and leishmaniasis, and cancer genetics.

Ibrahim is a founding member of the African Society of Human Genetics and co-founded the Sudanese National Academy of Sciences (SNAS). He is also a member of The World Academy of Sciences. He has co-authored more than 180 original peer-reviewed research publications, including work published in Science, Proceedings of the National Academy of Sciences, Nature, Nature Genetics, and other major journals.

== Early life and education ==
Ibrahim was born in Omdurman, Sudan. He received a Bachelor of Science degree in 1980 from Zagazig University in Egypt. He subsequently earned a postgraduate diploma in Medical Entomology and Parasitology from Cairo University in 1982 and a Masters of Science in Zoology from the University of Khartoum in 1987. In 1994, he graduated with a PhD in molecular biology from the University of Copenhagen.

== Career ==
Ibrahim served as a visiting research fellow in the Department of Pathology at the University of Cambridge from 1997 to 1998. In 1997 he was appointed as an assistant professor in the Institute of Endemic Diseases at the University of Khartoum. He was promoted to associate professor in 2002, and full professor in 2006. He also served as the chair of the Department of Molecular Biology in the Institute of Genetic Diseases at the University of Khartoum from 2002 to 2006.

Ibrahim was a co-founder of both the African Society of Human Genetics and the Sudanese National Academy of Sciences, and is a member of the World Academy of Sciences. He served on the council of advisors for the International Centre for Genetic Engineering and Biotechnology from 2004 to 2013. He has supervised more than 40 Masters and PhD students.

== Research ==
Ibrahim's work focuses on Sudanese and African human genetic diversity, as well as the role of diseases in shaping human genetics. He has studied the impact of genetics on susceptibility to diseases including malaria and leishmaniasis. He has also studied the genetics of cancer, including leading a study showing an association between Epstein–Barr virus infection and breast cancer in Sudan.

== Awards ==
Ibrahim won the C. N. R. Rao Prize for Scientific Research in 2014. This annual prize honors a fellow of The World Academy of Sciences who comes from a Least Developed Country and has contributed significantly to world science. The award was presented to Ibrahim for his "fundamental contribution to our understanding of the role of human genetic variation and population structure in disease susceptibility."

He is also a Fellow of The World Academy of Sciences since 2007.

== 2019 protests and imprisonment ==
After participating in non-violent protests advocating for political change in Sudan, Ibrahim was arrested and released twice in January 2019. Along with other academics, Ibrahim drafted a proposal for reforms to help resolve the political crisis in Sudan. Ibrahim was subsequently detained on February 21, 2019, and imprisoned for more than a month. Multiple groups, including Sudanese academics, the African Society of Human Genetics, the International Human Rights Network of Academies and Scholarly Societies, the Committee of Concerned Scientists, and Ibrahim's international colleagues, called for his release. Ibrahim was freed along with other political prisoners following the 2019 Sudanese coup d'état.

== Bibliography ==
- Tishkoff, Sarah A; et al. (December 10, 2006). "Convergent adaptation of human lactase persistence in Africa and Europe". Nature Genetics. 39 (1). Springer Nature: 31–40. doi:10.1038/ng1946. ISSN 1061-4036. PMC 2672153. PMID 17159977.
- Tishkoff, S. A.; et al. (April 30, 2009). "The Genetic Structure and History of Africans and African Americans". Science. 324 (5930). American Association for the Advancement of Science (AAAS): 1035–1044. Bibcode:2009Sci...324.1035T. doi:10.1126/science.1172257. ISSN 0036-8075. PMC 2947357. PMID 19407144.
- Mohamed, Hiba Salah; et al. (September 1, 2003). "SLC11A1 (formerly NRAMP1) and susceptibility to visceral leishmaniasis in The Sudan". European Journal of Human Genetics. 12 (1). Springer Nature: 66–74. doi:10.1038/sj.ejhg.5201089. ISSN 1018-4813. PMID 14523377.
- Jallow, Muminatou; et al. (June 2009). "Genome-wide and fine-resolution association analysis of malaria in West Africa". Nature Genetics. 41 (6): 657–665. doi:10.1038/ng.388. ISSN 1546-1718. PMC 2889040. PMID 19465909.
