= René Quéré =

French painter and ceramist (1932–2021)

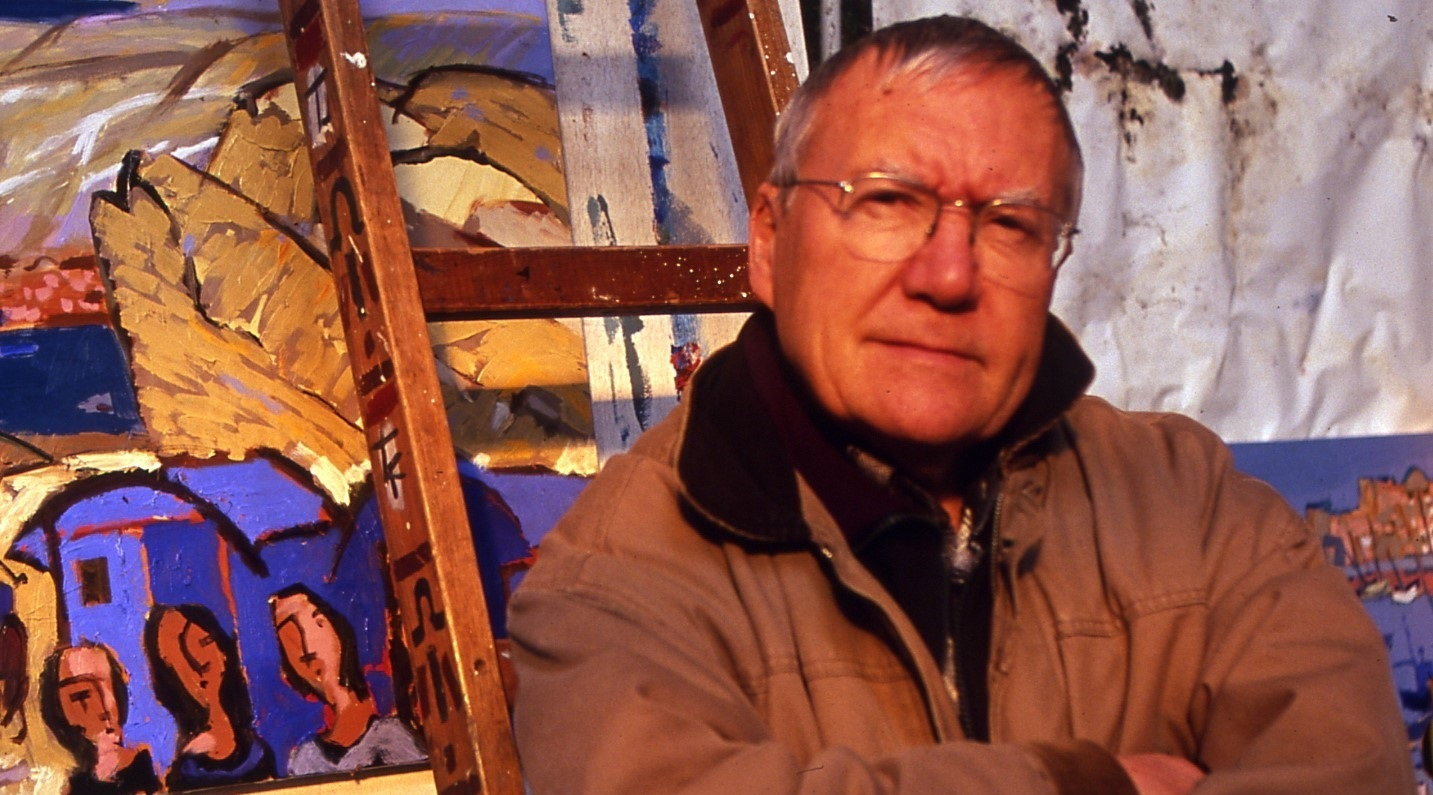
- Born: 26 May 1932; Ploaré, France
- Died: 17 August 2021 (aged 89)
- Occupations: Painter; Illustrator

René Quéré (26 May 1932 – 17 August 2021) was a French painter, illustrator, ceramist, and teacher.

== Biography ==
Born on 26 May 1932 in the Finistère department of Brittany, Quéré studied at the École régionale des beaux-arts de Quimper and was taught by the likes of Jos Le Corre and Pierre Toulhoat. During his studies, he frequented a Quimper faience company. Following two years of apprenticeship at the company, he dyed raw enamel unrolled by manganese dioxide.

Quéré spent his career as an independent artist, holding exhibitions in Brittany, Paris, Belgium, and Germany.

René Quéré died on 17 August 2021 at the age of 89.

== Publications ==
- Images de l'Iroise-Sein-Molène

== Public collections ==
=== Belgium ===
- Musée Merghelynck (Ypres)

=== France ===
- Musée des Beaux-Arts de Brest
- Briec Town Hall
- Douarnenez Town Hall
- Cosmos Foyer des PTT (Lannion)
- Musée des beaux-arts de Morlaix
- Plounévez-Lochrist Town Hall
- Armor-Lux (Quimper)
- Musée des Beaux-Arts de Quimper
- Musée départemental breton
- Musée de la Faïence de Quimper
- Chapelle Saint-Jean (Tréboul)

== Exhibitions ==
- 1955: Saluden gallery in Quimper, earthenware and gouaches.
- 1956: Salon des artistes de Cornouilles, Quimper museum.
- 1960: Paris, House of Brittany.
- 2002 (March–April): Gloux Gallery, Concarneau.
- From December 4, 2008, to January 3, 2009: Galerie Françoise Livinec, Paris, The Breton painter René Quéré in Paris.
