= Sudanese National Academy of Sciences =

National academy of sciences for Sudan

- الأكاديمية السودانية الوطنية للعلوم
- Abbreviation: SNAS
- Formation: August 2005; 21 years ago
- Founder: Ahmed Mohamed El Hassan; Muntaser Ibrahim
- Headquarters: 101 Building 7/31, Alshifa Street, Kafori, Khartoum North
- President: Mohamed Hag Ali Hassan
- Vice President: Muntaser Ibrahim
- Subsidiaries: Sudanese Academy of Young Scientists (SAYS)
- Website: www.snas.org.sd

The Sudanese National Academy of Sciences (SNAS) is a non-governmental organisation based in Khartoum, Sudan, that aims to promote the growth of the science and research sector in Sudan through collaboration in areas of education, science, technology, and research.

== History ==
The Academy was founded by a group of Sudanese scientists in August 2005 including Ahmed Mohamed El Hassan and Muntaser Ibrahim. Ahmed Mohamed El Hassan was the Founding President of SNAS, and was succeeded by Mohamed Hag Ali Hassan, who co-founded numerous scientific councils and was also the President of The World Academy of Sciences. As of April 2025, SNAS's Vice President is Muntaser Ibrahim, the Secretary General is Nimir Elbashir, and the Treasurer is Suad Sulaiman.

== Objectives and work ==
SNAS is an independent non-profit-making organisation consisting of outstanding Sudanese scientists in the country and abroad, and some foreign scientists are invited members. Its headquarters are temporarily located at the University of Khartoum.

The organization is considered the highest academic institution in Sudan and works to support and promote scientific research and innovation in the country. The main objectives of the Academy are to raise the standard of and further develop theoretical and applied research in Sudan, as well as to establish a national observatory for science, technology, and innovation.

SNAS conducts workshops and training courses, such as the capacity building for establishing of a national observatory for science, technology and innovation in Sudan and the monitoring and measuring indicators of science, technology and innovation. SNAS is involved in various activities such as organising scientific events and lectures, supporting scientific research, and providing training courses in science, technology, and innovation. The Academy completed its largest science-based project funded by United States Agency for International Development (USAID), which was a call for studies on Groundnuts and Aflatoxin Science in Gold Mining in Sudan.

SNAS has been involved in celebrating Sudan Week and organising the 3rd Community Lecture in collaboration with the Khartoum Institute for Scientific Research.

On 21 September 2023, SNAS made a plea to global academic institutions, urging them to aid university faculty and students displaced by the country's ongoing violent conflict. The war, ongoing since April, has ravaged Sudan's research community, damaging over 100 universities and research centres. The appeal requests that colleagues in national academies provide admission to Sudanese students and professors and seek contributions for rebuilding the war-ravaged facilities. The situation is described as "critical" for academics in Sudan, and recovery is anticipated to take at least five years, with many academics and students scattered in areas lacking modern communication.

== Members ==
SNAS has elected prominent Sudanese scientists as members. SNAS members include Elfatih Eltahir (H.M. King Bhumibol Professor of Hydrology and Climate at MIT), Mohamed El-Amin Ahmed El-Tom (Professor of math and the first minister of education after the Sudanese Revolution) in 2007, Ahmed Hassan Fahal (Professor of Surgery at the University of Khartoum) in 2007, and Nimir Elbashir (Professor at Texas A&M University at Qatar) in 2022.
