= InterAcademy Partnership =

Network of national academies of science, engineering and medicine

The InterAcademy Partnership (IAP) is a global network consisting of over 140 national and regional member academies of science, engineering, and medicine. It was founded in 1993 as the InterAcademy Panel (IAP). In 2000, the IAP founded the InterAcademy Council (IAC) and the InterAcademy Medical Panel (IAMP). The partnership was established in 2016 when it merged the three inter-related networks into IAP for Health (formerly IAMP), IAP for Science (formerly IAP), and IAP for Policy (formerly IAC).

The mission of IAP is for the world's merit-based academies to play a vital role in ensuring that science serves society inclusively and equitably and underpins global sustainable development by advising the public on the scientific aspects of critical global issues. It has released official statements on socially important topics, including the 2015 United Nations Sustainable Development Goals, food and nutrition security, science education, biosecurity, water, science communication, women in science, human population growth, global warming, human reproductive cloning, and evolution. IAP has also advanced science diplomacy by bringing regional networks together to address global problems.

== Governance ==
The highest decisive body of IAP is the General Assembly, which meets every third year, and where each member organization has one vote on organizational decisions. At these meetings, member academies elect new leadership, approve new members, report on organizational activities over the last triennial period, and approve a strategic plan for the next three years.

In between the meetings, the work is directed by three executive committees, one for each pillar of the Partnership (or in the case of IAP Policy, a board), supported by a secretariat from a host academy. Each executive committee/board convenes annually, with two co-chairs presiding. One of the co-chairs shall be nominated by an academy in a low or middle income country (LMIC); the other shall be nominated by a high income country (HIC). Similar rules of diversity in economic development hold for the executive committee member academies in order to represent a global view. The number of member academies composing the executive committee varies: 17 member academies in IAP Policy Advice Committee, 14 member academies in IAP Capacity Building Committee, and 15 member academies in IAP Communication, Education and Outreach Committee.

A Board composed of the six executive committee/board co-chairs guides the InterAcademy Partnership. From these six Board members, two are selected to act as co-Presidents. The current co-Presidents are Margareth (Peggy) A. Hamburg (USA) and Masresha Fetene (Ethiopia). The Board includes representatives from each of four regional networks of academies: in Africa, the Americas, the Asia/Pacific region, and Europe.

== Current and former co-chairs ==
- Cherry A. Murray, US. IAP-Science, 2019–present
- Masresha Fetene, Ethiopia. IAP-Policy, 2019–present
- Margaret Hamburg, US. IAP-Health, 2016–present
- Krishan Lal, India. IAP-Science, 2016–present
- Liu Depei, China. IAP-Health, 2016–present
- Richard Catlow, UK. IAP-Policy, 2016–present
- Volker ter Meulen, Germany. IAP-Science, 2013–2019
- Detlev Ganten, Germany. IAP-Health, 2013–2019
- Daya Reddy, South Africa. IAP-Policy, 2012–2019
- Mohammed H.A. Hassan, Sudan. IAP-Science, 2010–2016
- Lai Meng Loi, Malaysia. IAP-Health, 2010–2016
- Jo Ivey Boufford, US. IAP-Health, 2010–2013
- Robbert Dijkgraaf, Netherlands. IAP-Policy, 2008–2016
- Lu Yongxiang, China. IAP-Policy, 2008–2012
- Howard Alper, Canada. IAP-Science, 2007–2013
- Anthony Mbewu, South Africa. IAP-Health, 2007–2010
- Chen Zhu, China. IAP-Science, 2003–2010
- Guy de Thé, France. IAP-Health, 2000–2010
- Bruce Alberts, US. IAP-Policy, 2000–2008
- Goverdhan Mehta, India. IAP-Policy, 2000–2008
- Yves Quéré, France. IAP-Science, 2000–2007
- David Challoner, US. IAP-Health, 2000–2006
- Eduardo Krieger, Brazil. IAP-Science, until 2003

== IAP reports ==
IAP publishes reports and recommendations that utilize the expertise of member academies to address issues of interest to the global scientific and policy communities. IAP reports are not endorsed by academy members, but instead must have the consensus of an expert committee and undergo a rigorous peer review process. Examples of IAP reports include:

1. Health in the climate emergency: A global perspective, 2022
2. Harnessing science, engineering, and medicine (SEM) to address Africa's challenges: The role of African national academies, 2019
3. Improving scientific input to global policymaking with a focus on the UN Sustainable Development Goals, 2019
4. Opportunities for future research and innovation on food and nutrition security and agriculture: The InterAcademy Partnership's global perspective, 2018
5. Enhancing the capacity of African science academies, 2015
6. Responsible conduct in the global research enterprise, 2012
7. Lighting the way: Toward a sustainable energy future, 2007
8. Realizing the promise and potential of African agriculture, 2004

== IAP statements ==
IAP also promotes its goals through "statements on issues of fundamental importance to humanity." Statements present the combined consensus of the world's academies to provide independent, evidence-based advice and recommendations to policymakers in governments, international organizations, or academies themselves. Often an IAP statement can be used to globalise an issue on which a national academy or regional network of academies has already done a significant amount of work.

An IAP statement is developed following a specific procedure and released only when the majority of IAP member academies have endorsed its contents. , p. 4. Thus, the statements are intended to represent the consensus of the scientific community rather than statements of IAP as an organisation in itself.

As of 2021, IAP has issued twenty-five statements, as listed below.

1. IAP Statement on Implications of Urbanization in Low- and- Middle- Income Countries. Signed by 72 IAP member academies, this IAP Statement highlights policy measures aimed at improving urban living .
2. Climate Change and Biodiversity: Interlinkages and policy options. Signed by 81 IAP member academies, this IAP Statement highlights that climate and biodiversity policies are currently insufficiently connected and addressing climate change and biodiversity decline together is central to achieving the Sustainable Development Goals (SDGs).
3. IAP Statement on Regenerative Medicine. Signed by 74 IAP member academies. This IAP Statement highlights medical opportunities in addressing the causes of disease and warns against the misuse of regenerative medicine technologies – also when it comes to the proposed use of stem cells to tackle COVID-19.
4. IAP Statement on Protection of Marine Environments, 2021. Signed by 75 IAP member academies. This statement urges world leaders to improve ocean health by stopping habitat destruction and the spread of environmental contaminants, fighting climate change and overexploitation, and adopting evidence-based policies.
5. A Call to Action: Furthering the fight against falsified and substandard medical products, 2020. Signed by 78 member academies. This statement urges political decision-makers at all levels, in concert with regional and international organisations, to work with medical product regulatory authorities, national and international law enforcement agencies, manufacturers, importers, distributors, health professionals and patients to solve this issue.
6. IAP call for action to declare trauma as a disease, 2019. Signed by 46 of IAP for Health's 78 member academies.
7. IAP call for action to tackle the growing burden of dementia, 2018. Signed by 53 of IAP for Health's 78 member academies.
8. IAP statement on climate change and education, 2017. Signed by the majority of IAP for Science's 113 member academies.
9. IAP statement on science and technology for disaster risk reduction, 2017. Signed by the majority of IAP for Science's 113 member academies.
10. IAP call for action to improve the reproducibility of biomedical research, 2016. Signed by 46 members.
11. IAMP call for action to strengthen health research capacity, 2013. Signed by 42 members.
12. IAP statement on population and consumption, 2012. Signed by 105 members.
13. IAMP statement on the health co-benefits of policies to tackle climate change, 2010. Signed by 43 members.
14. IAP statement on tropical forests and climate change, 2009. Signed by 54 members.
15. IAP statement on ocean acidification, 2009. Signed by 70 members. The academies state that ocean water acidity has risen due to increased carbon dioxide (CO_{2}) caused by human activities, and that it probably will rise further with severe effects on marine ecosystems if the emission of CO_{2} does not decrease considerably. They urge the issue be recognized among the problems addressed by the United Nations Climate Change Conference 2009 in Copenhagen.
16. IAP statement on the teaching of evolution, 2006. Signed by 70 members.
17. IAP statement on biosecurity, 2005, signed by 71 members.
18. IAP statement on access to scientific information, 2003, signed by 68 members.
19. IAP statement on science and the media, 2003, signed by 68 members.
20. IAP statement on scientific capacity building, 2003, signed by 68 members.
21. IAP statement on science education of children, 2003, signed by 68 members.
22. IAP statement on health of mother and child in developing countries, 2003, signed by 67 members.
23. IAP statement on human cloning, 2003, signed by 67 members. The academies support "a worldwide ban on the reproductive cloning of human beings", but at the same time call for "cloning to obtain embryonic stem cells for both research and therapeutic purposes to be excluded from this ban".
24. IAP statement on transition to sustainability, 2000, signed by 63 members.
25. IAP statement on science and technology and the future of cities, 1996, signed by 71 members. The academies note that there is an ongoing rapid worldwide urbanization. They state that this in itself is not necessarily a bad development, but that it may have rather negative effects, if appropriate measures are not taken in order to ensure the new city dwellers e.g. access to water and adequate housing. Therefore, active city planning is necessary, and so is further research on urbanization.
26. IAP statement on population growth, proposed 1993, ratified 1994, signed by 58 members. The academies state that "the world is undergoing an unprecedented population expansion", and that it is necessary to stop it. They noted that the amount of food produced (both on land and sea) per person was decreasing, and stated that many environmental problems were aggravated by the population expansion. The academies state that we must reach "zero population growth within the lifetime of our children". They enumerate means which should be taken to achieve this, and also to counteract the effects of the population growth on environment and food production, inter alia. This includes furthering equal opportunities for women, easy access to cheap and safe contraceptives, broad primary health care, governmental policies recognizing longer-term environmental responsibilities, and increased research on cultural, religious, and other factors, which "affect reproductive behavior".

=== Role in reviewing the IPCC process ===
In 2010, the council board recommended changes in the IPCC, such as having an executive committee with "individuals from outside the IPCC or even outside the climate science community." Major changes from then within the IPCC approach include a stronger focus on the treatment of uncertainty (since the IAC 2010 IPCC review) and the involvement of risk management deliberations (based on fundamental conclusions in the AR4 Synthesis Report).

== See also ==
- International Council for Science
- InterAmerican Network of Academies of Sciences
- Network of African Science Academies
