= Jo Ivey Boufford =

American physician and academic

- Born: 1945 (age 80–81); Durham, North Carolina
- Citizenship: American
- Education: University of Michigan (BA); University of Michigan Medical School (MD)

Jo Ivey Boufford is an American physician and Dean of the Robert F. Wagner Graduate School of Public Service at New York University, as well as a Clinical Professor of Pediatrics at the NYU Medical School.

== Education ==
Boufford attended Wellesley College for two years before transferring to earn her bachelor's degree magna cum laude from the University of Michigan in psychology in 1967.

She later earned her medical degree from the University of Michigan Medical School with distinction in 1971.

== Career ==
Boufford completed a residency in social medicine and between 1975 and 1982, she served as the director of the residency program at Montefiore Hospital in New York City.

In 1985, Boufford was elected President of New York City Health and Hospitals Corporation, the largest municipal system in the United States, and was the first woman to hold the position. She served in the role until 1989. From May 1991 to September 1993, she served as Director of the King’s Fund College in London, England.

Moving to the public sector, in 1993 Boufford began serving as Principal Deputy Assistant Secretary for Health in the US Department of Health and Human Services under Philip R. Lee and Donna Shalala. In this role, she was also the U.S. representative to the World Health Organization's Executive Board. From January to May 1997, she was acting assistant secretary for health.

In 1997, she became the Dean of the Robert F. Wagner Graduate School of Public Service at New York University. In the new role, she also began working as professor of public administration at Wagner and a clinical professor of pediatrics at NYU Medical School.

She is the President of the International Society for Urban Health. With the Gates Foundation, Boufford developed a global health leadership initiative through teacher trainings while focusing on Africa. Boufford is also a senior program advisor to The Commonwealth Fund. She is on the board of directors of the United Hospital Fund, the Primary Care Development Corporation, the Village Center for Care, and the International Women's Health Coalition, as well as the executive board of the National Association of Schools of Public Affairs and Administration (for which she served as president between 2002 and 2003). She joined the Board of Trustees of the Novartis Foundation in 2018.

== Honors and awards ==
Boufford has earned a number of Honorary Doctorates of Science from the University of Toledo in 2012, Pace University in 2011, New York Medical College in 2007, and State University of New York, Brooklyn in 1992.

In 2007, she was named one of the Top 100 most influential women by Crain's New York Business.

In 1992, she became a member of the National Academy of Medicine. In 2005, Boufford became a fellow of the National Academy of Public Administration. Additionally, Boufford is a fellow of the American Academy of Pediatrics and the New York Academy of Medicine.

She was awarded a Robert Wood Johnson Health Policy Fellowship from the Institute of Medicine in 1980.

== Books ==
- Jo Ivey Boufford, Pat A. Shonubi. Community Oriented Primary Care: Training for Urban Practice. Praeger. ISBN 0275913074
