= France Quéré =

French Protestant theologian, writer (1936–1995)

- Born: France Éliette Blanche Jaulmes; 27 April 1936; Montpellier (Hérault), France
- Died: 14 April 1995 (aged 58); Le Kremlin-Bicêtre, France
- Education: Protestant Faculty of Theology in Montpellier
- Occupations: Theologian and author
- Spouse: Yves Quéré
- Children: 3

France Quéré (born France Éliette Blanche Jaulmes; 27 April 1936 – 14 April 1995) was a French Protestant theologian and author of numerous works. Initially a specialist in writings of the ancient Church Fathers, whom she translated and commented on, she went on to study the condition of women and participate in ethical reflections of her time, particularly bioethics. An editorial writer for La Croix, Panorama and Réforme, she gave numerous lectures in France, Switzerland, Belgium, Algeria, and many other countries. She was named an honorary doctor by the University of Neuchâtel.

== Biography ==
The daughter of Professor Paul Jaulmes (who created the national diploma program in oenology at the Montpellier Faculty of Pharmacy), she pursued studies in both classical literature and theology at the Protestant Faculty of Theology in Montpellier. There she attended the lectures of Wilhelm Vischer (1895–1988) on the Old Testament and Georges Crespy (1920–1976) on philosophy and sociology. In 1957, she defended her graduate thesis in literature on Moral Preaching in the Plays of Seneca. After a brief period teaching at the secondary level, she began publishing her translations of the Church Fathers. These studies of early Christians introduced her to critical investigations of old texts, which led her to explore more specifically theological works. At the same time, she developed her thinking about contemporary concerns: the evolution of the family, the place of women in society, and the tragedies of terminal illness and disability, in particular. Her work in these areas led to her appointment to several bodies, notably the High Council for the Family and the National Consultative Ethics Committee, where the strength of her thinking was reflected in her continued reappointments. She also became president of "Your School at Home."

Her writings met with great success in both Protestant and Catholic circles, as evidenced by the multiple print runs of her books. Her writings appeared in the Roman Catholic newspaper La Croix, the weekly paper Reform and the monthly magazine Panorama, and numerous courses and lectures.

She married Yves Quéré in a 1961 ecumenical ceremony; they had three children, David, Anne and Emmanuelle. She died suddenly on 14 April 1995 at Le Kremlin-Bicêtre, from an asthma attack. Her husband, a physicist, member of the French Academy of Sciences and professor at the École Polytechnique, published a posthumous tribute book to her, entitled La culture, hommage à France Quéré.

On 28 November 2025, to mark the 30th anniversary of her death, a symposium was held in Paris called “France Quéré: A Living Faith, A Free Mind,” at the Protestant Institute of Theology. It was organized by Caroline Bauer, national secretary for training in the United Protestant Church of France, and theologian Stéphane Lavignotte. The closing speaker was her husband, Yves Quéré.

== Selected works ==
- Quéré, France. "Reflections of Gregory of Nazianzus on feminine adornment (Study of the poem on coquetry, I, II, 29)." Revue des sciences religieuses 42, no. 1 (1968): 62-71.
- Quéré, France. "Are the Fathers Jansenists? Remarks on the classical translation of Gregory of Nazianzus." Revue des sciences religieuses 45, no. 3 (1971): 270-275.
- Quéré, France. "The transmission of the gospel." Études théologiques et religieuses 50, no. 1 (1975): 13-27.
- Quéré, France. "For a Total Feminism." Esprit (1940-) 458 (6 (1976): 1057-1078.
- Quéré, France. "A society of the body!" In La France en prospects, pp. 267-282. Odile Jacob, 1996.
