= Yves Quéré =

French physicist

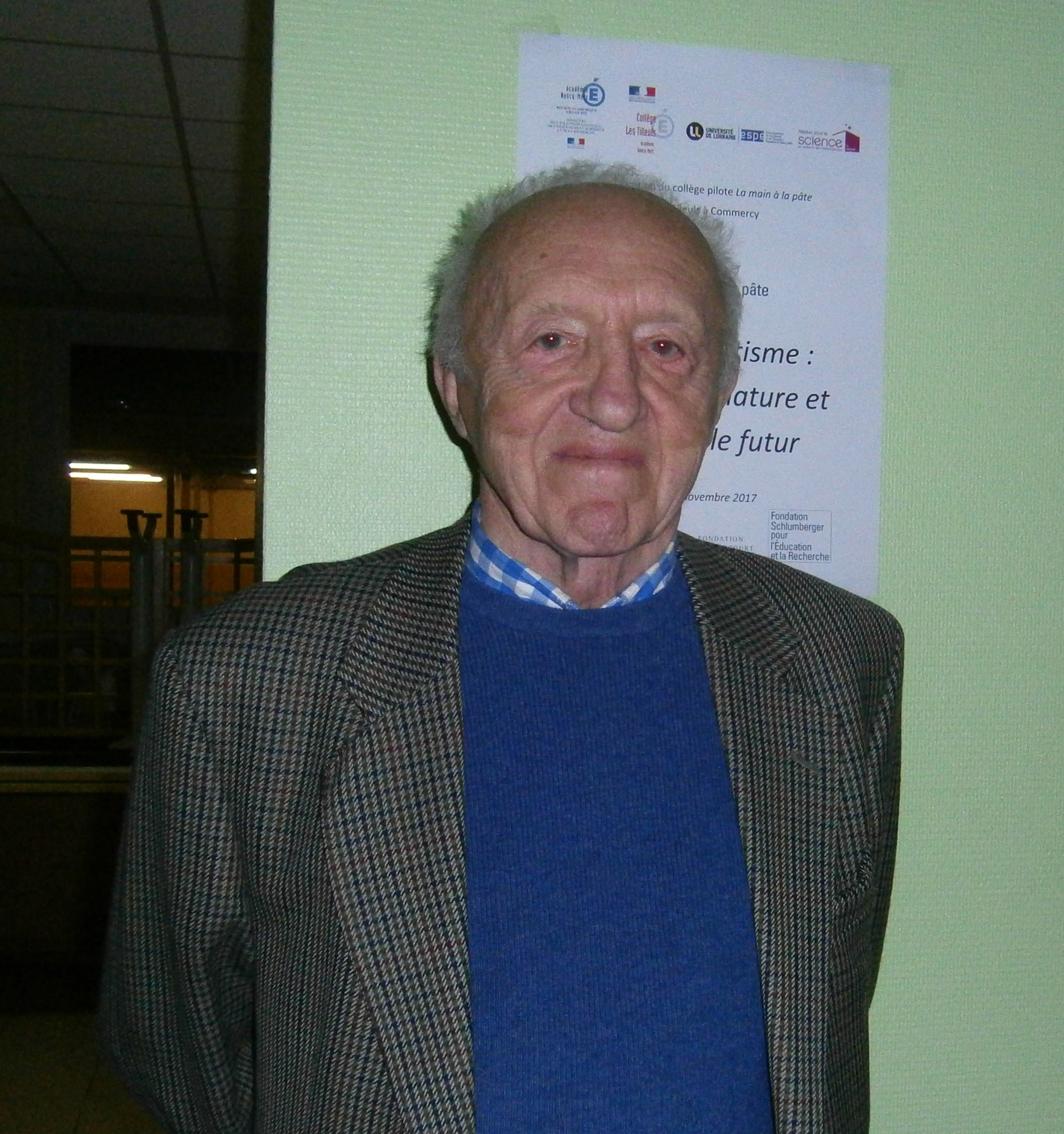
Yves Quéré in 2017

Yves Quéré (born 1931 in Commercy) is a French physicist and a member of the Academy of Sciences.

Quéré is Professor Emeritus at the École Polytechnique, where he was elected President of the Department of Physics and President of the Senate of Professors, and then appointed Director of Education.

== Biography and personal life ==
A mining engineer (Paris) with a doctorate in science, he worked at the Commissariat à l'énergie atomique and then at the École polytechnique

In 1961, he married France Quéré, a writer and theologian. They had three children: David, Anne and Emmanuelle.

With Jean-Michel Molkhou, Philip Boenhoffer and Frédéric Fortineau, he won a 1st Prize at the CEM (European Chamber Music Competition).

== Scientific work ==
His research is on the physics of materials and in particular on the study of the interaction of particles with solids and the effects of irradiation, placing his work at the border between academic research and applications.

This work focused on:

- The effects of radiation on solids. Having discovered the phenomenon of very low-temperature growth of uranium irradiated by neutrons and explained theoretically (with Jean Blin) the "exaggerated swelling" by fission gases in nuclear fuels, he developed (with Florence Rullier) the selective displacement of atoms in a binary alloy, notably superconductor and studied (with Jean Leteurtre, Libero Zuppiroli and Jacques Dural) the "induced flow" (by irradiation) of various metallic and ionic materials.
- The study of punctual defects in metals and in particular that of gaps in silver. He discovered and studied the strong interaction with the included oxygen atoms.
- The channelling of protons and alpha particles into crystals. Having developed (with Jean Mory and Georges Désarmot) the "canaligraphic" method, he demonstrated the decanalising power of most crystalline defects, and in particular the dislocations for which he established the theory and measured the effect.
- The development (with René Boucher et al.) of long-lasting batteries for pacemakers and various anti-tumour devices based on transuranic elements.

== Honours ==
Member of the French Academy of Sciences since 18 February 1991, he was its delegate for international relations for eight years. Yves Quéré was elected in 2000 as co-chair of the InterAcademy Panel (IAP), which is the assembly of the 100 or so Academies of Science around the world. With Georges Charpak and Pierre Léna, he has been involved since 1996 in the renovation of science education at school, "La Main à la pâte", where he has been particularly involved in international dissemination (Europe, Latin America, China, French-speaking Africa...)

He was appointed a member of the Pontifical Academy of Sciences on 20 December 2003. He was promoted to the rank of Commandeur of the Légion d'Honneur on 13 July 2007.

== Selected publications ==
He is the author of about a hundred publications and several books, including:

- Punctual defects in metals (Masson, 1967)
- Physics of Materials (Ellipsse) and Physics of Materials (John Wiley)
- Teaching science (Odile Jacob, 2002)
- The Wisdom of the Physicist, (L'œil neuf, 2005)
- Children and science, with Georges Charpak and Pierre Léna (Odile Jacob, 2005)
- Teaching, communicating, (Le Pommier, 2008)
- Sixteenth notes (Le Pommier, 2010)
- Language and science, with Alain Bentolila (Plon, 2014)
- A shell in the hollow of the ear (Odile Jacob, 2018)
