= Nashwa Eassa =

Sudanese nano-particle physicist

Nashwa Abo Alhassan Eassa
- Born: 1980 (age 45–46); Omdurman
- Citizenship: Sudan
- Education: Nelson Mandela University University of Khartoum Linköping University
- Occupation: physicist Scientist University teacher
- Employer: Neelain University
- Awards: OWSD-Elsevier Foundation Award

Nashwa Abo Alhassan Eassa (Arabic: نشوى أبو الحسن عيسى) is a nano-particle physicist from Sudan. She is an assistant professor of physics and Dean of the Deanship of Scientific Research at Al-Neelain University in Khartoum.

== Education ==
Eassa received her BSc in physics from the University of Khartoum in 2004. In Sudan, those who wish to seek further education must study abroad, for women this is difficult for both financial reasons and cultural ones restricting women from traveling. Despite this she earned her Master of Science in nanotechnology and materials physics from Sweden's Linköping University in 2007. During her time at Linköping, tuition fees were not an issue for international students, however she still needed to manage her living expenses. To support her needs she worked at McDonald’s and distributed advertising to make a living for her work.

Through a OWSD PhD Fellowship she was able to attend and graduate Nelson Mandela Metropolitan University from August 2008 to September 2012. During the first year of her stay she had given birth to her first child which made it difficult.

In August of 2008, the OSWD PhD fellowship motivated her to continue her studies in South Africa. She was able to balance the demands of her studies, motherhood, and marriage. Despite a demanding supervisor, she completed her PhD and gained valuable research experience which was unavailable in Sudan due to a lack of facilities. Her achievements at Linköping University earned her the honorary doctorate by the Faculty of Science and Engineering at Linköping, in recognition of her support to women who would want to further their education in research in Sudan. She emphasizes her want to help women in many places not only in Sudan, but also in Egypt, Yemen, Ghana, Benin, and Syria. Reflecting on her experience she states, “Support from other women in the academic world may be decisive to them continuing their career.” Nanosctructures: study the luminescence from InAs/GalnSb and InGaAs/InAsSb quantum well and also superlattice structures in order to investigate band alignments and interface quality.

== Career ==
She has been a lecturer and assistant professor of physics at Al-Neelain University since 2007. She earned her PhD from Nelson Mandela Metropolitan University (NMMU) in 2012. Since 2013, Eassa is pursuing a post-doctoral fellowship in nanophotonics at NMMU. She founded the non-governmental organization Sudanese Women in Sciences in 2013 and is a member of Organization for Women in Science for the Developing World's South African Institute of Physics. From 2016 to 2020, Eassa also held the title of Vice President of the "Arab Region of Organization for Women Scientist in Developing World

In 2015, Eassa won the Elsevier Foundation Award for Early Career Women Scientists in the Developing World. The award recognized her research on lessening film accumulation on the surface of high-speed semiconductors.

Eassa is involved in the development of nanotube structures and titanium oxide nanoparticles. She is also involved in projects to develop methods to split water molecules for hydrogen collection and to sanitize water with solar radiation.

She has been a candidate as Arab Countries Vice-President for Organization for Women in Science for the Developing World.

As an Assistant Professor in Khartoum, her achievements include awards like the Elsevier Award and the Lindau Prize. These awards brought international visibility and opportunities. She improved training opportunities and fosters support through industries like an OWSD National Chapter for the next generation of women scientists in Sudan.

Nashwa is a Sudanese woman physicist who overcame cultural and academic challenges to achieve international recognition. In Sudan, societal norms restrict women’s independence, but she pursued her passion for physics despite its limited resources and lack of stability.

== Publications ==
Eassa's professional work appears in publications from journals like the African Journal of Engineering and the 2021 International Congress of Advanced Technology and Engineering. Aside from her publications on nanoparticles, she has also integrated her push for "gender equality" and the "gender gap in science and technology" in articles like her 2015 "Development of Sudanese Women in Physics".

== Advocacy work ==
Eassa has contributed to multiple works detailing the roadblocks African scientists face. Eassa states that the African government's lack of attention to scientific research is the main cause of the low funding that researchers receive. This trickles down to individual researchers not developing the skills they need and working in poor research environments.Eassa has also conducted research on the demographic of female physicists in Sudan. The research, conducted at Al Neelain University in Khartoum, highlights a university where the enrollment of female undergraduate physics students is double that of male students. Eassa collected data about the female students' interest in continuing their post-secondary education journeys and the effects of financial hardships on that decision. This research showed that an overwhelming number of female physicists at the university held lecturer positions due to the lack of female physicists attaining higher degrees.
