= Network of African Science Academies =

African organization of science academies

The Network of African Science Academies (NASAC) is a coalition of national science academies across Africa, established in December 2001. It serves as a platform for collaboration on scientific challenges, policy advice, and advancing research relevant to the continent. NASAC promotes evidence-based decision-making, training, and joint statements on issues like health, environment, and sustainable development. Headquartered in Nairobi, Kenya, it has grown to include 32 member academies and 7 affiliate members.

Member academies are:

- African Academy of Sciences
- Académie Algérienne des Sciences et Technologies
- Académie Nationale des Sciences, Arts et Lettres du Benin
- Botswana Academy of Sciences
- L’Académie Nationale des Sciences, des Arts et des Lettres du Burkina Faso
- Burundi Academy of Sciences and Technology
- Cameroon Academy of Sciences
- Académie Nationale des Sciences et Technologies du Congo
- Congolese Academy of Sciences in the Democratic Republic of the Congo
- Academy of Scientific Research and Technology, Egypt
- Kingdom of Eswatini Academy of Sciences
- Ethiopian Academy of Sciences
- Ghana Academy of Arts and Sciences
- Académie des Sciences de Guinée
- Kenya National Academy of Sciences
- Madagascar's National Academy of Arts, Letters and Sciences
- Académie des Sciences du Mali
- Mauritius Academy of Science and Technology
- Hassan II Academy of Science and Technology in Morocco
- Academy of Sciences of Mozambique
- Nigerian Academy of Science
- Rwanda Academy of Sciences
- l'Académie des Sciences et Techniques du Sénégal
- Academy of Science of South Africa
- Sudanese National Academy of Sciences
- Tanzania Academy of Sciences
- Académie Nationale Des Sciences, Arts Et Lettres Du Togo
- Tunisian Academy of Sciences, Letters and Arts
- Uganda National Academy of Sciences
- Zambia Academy of Sciences
- Zimbabwe Academy of Sciences
- L’Académie des Sciences, des Arts, des Cultures d’Afrique et des Diasporas Africaines

== Statement on climate change ==
In 2007, the Network of African Science Academies submitted a joint “statement on sustainability, energy efficiency, and climate change” to the leaders meeting at the G8 Summit in Heiligendamm, Germany.

“A consensus, based on current evidence, now exists within the global scientific community that human activities are the main source of climate change and that the burning of fossil fuels is largely responsible for driving this change.”
