= National academy =

Organizational body

A national academy is an organizational body, usually operating with state financial support and approval, that co-ordinates scholarly research activities and standards for academic disciplines, and serves as public policy advisors, research institutes, think tanks, and public administration consultants for governments or on issues of public importance, most frequently in the sciences but also in the humanities. Typically the country's learned societies in individual disciplines will liaise with or be coordinated by the national academy. National academies play an important organisational role in academic exchanges and collaborations between countries.

The extent of official recognition of national academies varies between countries. In some cases, like France or Spain, they are explicitly or de facto an arm of government; in others, as in the United Kingdom, they are voluntary, non-profit bodies with which the government has agreed to negotiate, and which may receive government financial support while retaining substantial independence. In some countries, a single academy covers all disciplines. In others, there are several academies, which work together more or less closely; for example, France, where the Institut de France groups five self-governing Academies, or Spain, where the Institute of Spain fulfills a similar function. In many states, they are organized in academies of science. In the countries of the former Soviet Union, and in the People's Republic of China, the national academies have considerable power over policy and personnel in their areas. There is, however, a growing consensus among international federations of learned academies that bona fide national (or learned) academies need to adhere to certain criteria:

- The fellowship is elected, on the basis of excellence, by existing fellows (members)
- The number of fellows is restricted either to a total number or to a rate of accretion
- The governance of the academy is democratic and "bottom up". The fellowship is the ultimate source of the academy's authority
- The academy is independent of government, industry and professional associations. Most, if not all, academies derive some financial support from some or all of these other organisations but this support needs to be given in a manner that does not compromise the academy's independence.

== Significance ==
Election to a leading national academy is one of the strongest forms of peer recognition in science and engineering: official academy sources describe it as among the highest professional honors, and empirical studies show that learned-academy fellows are drawn overwhelmingly from the extreme upper tail of scientific achievement. Academy members are also substantially overrepresented among Nobel laureates, although academy election should be understood as elite peer recognition rather than as a formal predictor of Nobel-, Turing-, Abel-, or Fields-level prizes.

== United States ==
In 1863, President of the United States Abraham Lincoln incorporated the United States National Academies of Sciences, Engineering, and Medicine (NASEM). The affiliated organizations were granted congressional charters to operate under the National Academy of Sciences. In 1916 President Woodrow Wilson reincorporated the organization under the National Research Council to foster scientific research emphasizing American industries. Today NASEM is composed of three non-profit member organizations: the National Academy of Sciences (NAS), the National Academy of Engineering (NAE), and the National Academy of Medicine (NAM) (after 2015; formerly Institute of Medicine (IoM)). The U.S. national academies also serve as public policy advisors, research institutes, think tanks, and public administration consultants on issues of public importance or on request by the government.

Name	Year founded	Area of focus	President	Notes
National Academy of Sciences	1863	Science	Marcia McNutt	
National Academy of Engineering	1964	Engineering	John L. Anderson	
National Academy of Medicine	1970	Medicine	Victor Dzau	Established as the Institute of Medicine (1970–2015)

== United Kingdom ==
In the United Kingdom four national academies are the major learned societies of England: the Academy of Medical Sciences, British Academy, the Royal Academy of Engineering and the Royal Society. In addition, there are the Learned Society of Wales in Wales and the Royal Society of Edinburgh in Scotland. The UK Young Academy is for young scientists.

Name	Country	Year founded	Area of focus	Patron or President	Notes
Royal Society	England	1660	Hard sciences, soft sciences	Charles III	The Invisible College was a precursor to the Royal Society of London. In 1660, the informal committee of 12 philosophers formed the College for the Promoting of Physico-Mathematical Experimental Learning.
Royal Society of Edinburgh	Scotland	1783	Hard sciences, soft sciences, arts, humanities, medicine, social sciences	Sir Anton Muscatelli as President	The Royal Society was founded during the Scottish Enlightenment as the Edinburgh Society for Improving Arts and Sciences.
British Academy	England	1902	Humanities and social sciences	Professor Julia Black CBE FBA as President	The British Academy was first proposed in 1899 as the British Academy for the Promotion of Historical, Philosophical and Philological Studies. The name was subsequently shortened and incorporated in 1901, receiving royal charter from King Edward VII in 1902.
Royal Academy of Engineering	England	1976	Engineering	Prince Philip, Duke of Edinburgh was Senior Fellow until his death Anne, Princess Royal and Prince Edward, Duke of Kent as Royal Fellows; Sir John Lazar as President	The Fellowship of Engineering was conceived in the late 1960s under Harold Wilson, and subsequently established in 1976. It was granted royal charter in 1983 and renamed the Royal Academy of Engineering in 1992.
Academy of Medical Sciences	England	1998	Biomedical and health research	Professor Dame Anne Johnson as President	The academy was established by a working group chaired by Michael Atiyah.
Learned Society of Wales	Wales	2010	Hard sciences, soft sciences, arts, humanities, medicine, social sciences	Hywel R. Thomas as president; Charles, Prince of Wales as Patron	
UK Young Academy	United Kingdom & Ireland	2022	Young scientists		The academy was established by seven UK/Irish academies.

== Kingdom of Spain ==
Spain's national academy system is organized around the Institute of Spain (Instituto de España), a public-law corporation that brings together the country's Royal Academies of national scope for the coordination of functions they may exercise in common. The Spanish Ministry of Science describes the Institute as Spain's highest national academic representation, both domestically and abroad.

The Royal Academies forming part of the Institute include the Royal Spanish Academy, the Royal Academy of History, the Royal Academy of Fine Arts of San Fernando, the Royal Academy of Exact, Physical and Natural Sciences, the Royal Academy of Moral and Political Sciences, the Royal National Academy of Medicine of Spain, the Royal Academy of Jurisprudence and Legislation, the Royal National Academy of Pharmacy of Spain, the Royal Academy of Engineering, and the Royal Academy of Economic and Financial Sciences. These academies are linked administratively to the Spanish government through the ministry responsible for relations with the Royal Academies, national academies, and the Institute of Spain.

Spanish academies of national scope are created by royal decree and have legal personality and full capacity to carry out their purposes from the moment of their creation. They are composed of a limited number of leading scholars elected by their peers in recognition of exceptional achievement. They are charged with providing independent advice to the government on science or scholarship. Their rights and obligations under public law distinguish them from learned societies established under private law. For example, the Royal Academy of Engineering was created by Royal Decree 859/1994 as a public-law corporation with its own legal personality, to promote engineering science and advise the state and society on technological matters.

== Japan ==
In Japan, all of the national academies were established during the early years of the Showa Era. The two premier national academies in the country are the Science Council of Japan and The Japan Academy. Representing the artistic profession and literature is the Japan Art Academy.

The Science Council of Japan (SCJ) was founded by American physicist Harry C. Kelly in 1949 during the Allied occupation of Japan as a special organisation under the Prime Minister's jurisdiction, operating independently from the Government of Japan to promoting and enhancing scientific research in the country. The SCJ represents all Japanese scientists, researchers and engineers from multiple fields from the natural sciences to the humanities, making necessary policy recommendations relating to science and technology to the national government. The SCJ has 210 Council Members stipulated by a mandated quota as well as 2,000 Associate Members nationwide.

Name	Year founded	Area of focus	President	Notes
Science Council of Japan 日本学術会議	1949	Social sciences, natural sciences, engineering, medicine, humanities	Takaaki Kajita	
The Japan Academy 日本学士院	1947	Social sciences, natural sciences, engineering, medicine, humanities	Takeshi Sasaki	The Japan Academy was originally established as the Tokyo Academy, becoming the Imperial Academy later in 1907. The academy awards three prestigious awards: The Imperial Prize, The Duke of Edinburgh Prize, and The Japan Academy Prize.
Japan Art Academy 日本芸術院	1937	Fine art, literature, music, drama, dance	Man Nomura	

== List ==
- Albania: Academy of Sciences of Albania
- Armenia: Armenian National Academy of Sciences
- Australia: Australian Academy of Science, Australian Academy of Technological Sciences and Engineering, Australian Academy of the Humanities, Academy of the Social Sciences in Australia, National Academies Forum
- Austria: Austrian Academy of Sciences
- Azerbaijan: Azerbaijan National Academy of Sciences
- Belarus: National Academy of Sciences of Belarus
- Belgium: Royal Academy of French Language and Literature of Belgium, Royal Academy of Dutch Language and Literature; see also Academies of Belgium
- Bosnia and Herzegovina: Academy of Sciences and Arts of Bosnia and Herzegovina
- Brazil: Brazilian Academy of Sciences
- Bulgaria: Bulgarian Academy of Sciences
- Canada: Royal Society of Canada, Canadian Academy of Health Sciences, Canadian Academy of Engineering
- Cambodia: Royal Academy of Cambodia
- Chile: Academia Chilena de Ciencias
- China: Chinese Academy of Sciences, Chinese Academy of Social Sciences, Chinese Academy of Agricultural Sciences, Chinese Academy of Engineering, Chinese Academy of Medical Sciences
  - Hong Kong: Hong Kong Academy of the Humanities
- Costa Rica – Academia Nacional de Ciencias (Costa Rica)
- Croatia: Croatian Academy of Sciences and Arts
- Czech Republic: Academy of Sciences of the Czech Republic
- Denmark: Royal Danish Academy of Sciences and Letters
- Estonia: Estonian Academy of Sciences
- Ethiopia: Imperial Academy (former)
- Finland: The Finnish Academy of Science and Letters (Finnish: Suomalainen tiedeakatemia) is a Finnish-speaking academy, while The Finnish Society of Science and Letters (Swedish: Finska vetenskaps-societeten, Finnish: Suomen tiedeseura) is bilingual. In the field of engineering, the Finnish Academy of Technology (Finnish: Teknillisten tieteiden akatemia, Swedish: Akademin för Tekniska Vetenskaper) is bilingual while the Swedish Academy of Engineering Sciences in Finland (Swedish: Svenska tekniska vetenskapsakademien i Finland) Swedish-speaking. The Academy of Finland is not an academy in the sense of this article, but the state research funding agency.
- France: The Institut de France comprises five academies, including the Académie française and French Academy of Sciences.
- Georgia: Georgian National Academy of Sciences
- Germany: Leopoldina
- Ghana: Ghana Academy of Arts and Sciences
- Greece: Academy of Athens
- Hungary: Hungarian Academy of Sciences (Hungarian: Magyar Tudományos Akadémia)
- India: The National Academy of Sciences, India; Indian National Science Academy; Indian Academy of Sciences; Indian National Academy of Engineering; Sahitya Akademi; National Bal Bhawan; Lalit Kala Akademi
- Indonesia: Indonesian Academy of Sciences (Indonesian: Akademi Ilmu Pengetahuan Indonesia)
- Iran: Academy of Persian Language and Literature; Academy of Sciences of Iran; Iranian Academy of the Arts; Iranian Academy of Medical Sciences
- Ireland: Royal Irish Academy
- Israel: Israel Academy of Sciences and Humanities
- Italy: Accademia dei Fisiocritici (National Academy of Sciences of Siena), Accademia dei Lincei for sciences, Accademia della Crusca for Italian language, Accademia nazionale delle scienze (detta dei XL); a general and supreme national academy was the Accademia d'Italia during the Fascist period.
- Ivory Coast – Académie des sciences, des arts, des cultures d'Afrique et des diasporas africaines
- Kosovo: Academy of Sciences and Arts of Kosovo
- Latvia: Latvian Academy of Sciences
- Lithuania: Lithuanian Academy of Sciences
- Montenegro: Montenegrin Academy of Sciences and Arts
- Morocco: Academy of the Kingdom of Morocco
- Netherlands: Royal Netherlands Academy of Arts and Sciences
- North Korea: Academy of Sciences of the Democratic People's Republic of Korea
- North Macedonia: Macedonian Academy of Sciences and Arts
- Norway: Norwegian Academy of Science and Letters
- Pakistan: Pakistan Academy of Letters, Pakistan Academy of Sciences
- Philippines: National Academy of Science and Technology
- Poland: Polish Academy of Sciences, Polish Academy of Learning
- Portugal: Academia das Ciências de Lisboa
- Romania: The Romanian Academy covers the scientific, artistic and literary domains.
- Russia: The Russian Academy of Sciences is the main organising body for fundamental sciences and humanities. There are also five independent specialised national academies: Russian Academy of Medical Sciences, Russian Academy of Architecture and Construction Sciences, Russian Academy of Education, Russian Academy of Agriculture Sciences, and Russian Academy of Arts. These are government-funded, but self-governing.
- San Marino: International Academy of Sciences San Marino
- Serbia: Serbian Academy of Sciences and Arts
- Slovenia: Slovenian Academy of Sciences and Arts
- South Africa: Academy of Science of South Africa
- Spain: The Royal Academy is the main reference body for the Spanish language. Real Academia de Bellas Artes de San Fernando covers the artistic fields; Real Academia de la Historia is the organising body for History; the Royal Academy of Moral and Political Sciences covers the humanities; Royal Academy of Exact, Physical and Natural Sciences covers natural sciences and mathematics; Real Academia de Jurisprudencia y Legislación covers the field of law. The Royal Academy of Engineering of Spain is the national academy in that field.
  - Catalonia: Institute for Catalan Studies
- Sri Lanka: National Academy of Sciences of Sri Lanka
- Sudan: Sudanese National Academy of Sciences
- Sweden: Swedish Academy for language, Royal Swedish Academy of Sciences and the Royal Swedish Academy of Engineering Sciences
- Taiwan (Republic of China): Academia Sinica
- Thailand: Royal Institute of Thailand
- Turkey: Turkish Academy of Sciences is funded by the government but maintains autonomy
- Ukraine: National Academy of Sciences of Ukraine. Other state organizations also include National Academy of Arts of Ukraine, National Academy of Medical Sciences of Ukraine, National Academy of Agrarian Sciences of Ukraine, National Academy of Legal Sciences of Ukraine, National Academy of Pedagogical Sciences of Ukraine, Minor Academy of Sciences of Ukraine.
- United Kingdom: the Royal Society is recognised as the national academy for the sciences, the British Academy for the social sciences and the humanities, the Royal Academy of Engineering for engineering, and the Academy of Medical Sciences for medicine; the UK Young Academy is for young scientists.
  - Scotland: Royal Society of Edinburgh
- United States: The National Academies of the United States include four organisations: the National Academy of Sciences (NAS), the National Academy of Engineering (NAE), the National Academy of Medicine (NAM), and the National Research Council (NRC). See also American Academy of Arts and Sciences, American Academy of Arts and Letters, American Academy of Diplomacy, Academy of American Poets, National Academy of Design.
- Vatican City: Pontifical Academy of Sciences
- Vietnam: Vietnam Academy of Science and Technology (VAST)

Within most countries, the unqualified phrase "National Academy" will normally refer to that country's academy. For example, within the United States, the plural phrase "National Academies" is widely understood to refer to the U.S. National Academies.

== See also ==
- Academy of Medicine (disambiguation)
- Academy of Sciences
- International Science Council
