= Spanish Royal Academy (disambiguation) =

The term Spanish Royal Academy generally refers to the Real Academia Española (the national academy for the Spanish language), but may also refer to:

- Nationally:
  - Real Academia de Bellas Artes de San Fernando (Royal Academy of Fine Arts, St Ferdinand)
  - Real Academia de la Historia (Royal Academy of History)
  - Spanish Royal Academy of Sciences (Royal Academy of Sciences)
  - Real Academia Nacional de Medicina (Royal National Academy of Medicine)
  - Real Academia Nacional de Medicina (Royal National Academy of Pharmacy)
  - Royal Academy of Jurisprudencia y Legislación (Royal Academy of Jurisprudence and Legislation)
  - Royal Academy of Moral and Political Sciences (Royal Academy of Moral and Political Sciences)
  - Real Academia de Ingeniería (Royal Academy of Engineering)
  - Real Academia de Ciencias Económicas y Financieras (Royal Academy of Economic and Financial Sciences)
- In Catalonia and the Valencian Community:
  - Real Academia de Bellas Artes de San Carlos de Valencia (Royal Academy of Fine Arts of St Charles, Valencia)
  - Reial Acadèmia de Medicina de Catalunya (Royal Academy of Medicine of Catalonia)
  - Reial Acadèmia de Bones Lletres de Barcelona (Royal Academy of Good Letters of Barcelona)
  - Reial Acadèmia Catalana de Belles Arts de Sant Jordi (Royal Catalan Academy of Fine Arts of St George)
