= Academy of Medicine =

Academy of Medicine or Academy of Surgery may refer to:

== Asia ==
=== Israel ===
- Jerusalem Academy of Medicine

=== Malaysia ===
- Academy of Medicine of Malaysia

=== Singapore ===
- Academy of Medicine, Singapore

== Europe ==
=== Austria ===
- Josephinian Military Academy of Surgery
- Medical University of Vienna

=== Belgium ===
- Académie Royale de Médecine de Belgique
- Koninklijke Academie voor Geneeskunde van België

=== Denmark ===
- Royal Danish Academy of Surgery

=== France ===
- Académie Nationale de Médecine (1820), which replaced the former Académie royale de chirurgie (1731) and Société royale de médecine (1776)

=== Ireland and the UK ===
- Academy of Medical Royal Colleges

=== Spain ===
- Royal National Academy of Medicine

== North America ==
=== Mexico ===
- National Academy of Medicine (Mexico)

=== United States ===
- National Academy of Medicine

By state:

- Delaware Academy of Medicine, Wilmington, Delaware, listed on the National Register of Historic Places (NRHP)
- Academy of Medicine (Atlanta), listed on the NRHP in Georgia
- New York Academy of Medicine
- Richmond Academy of Medicine, Richmond, Virginia, listed on the NRHP in Richmond, Virginia

== South America ==
=== Argentina ===
- Buenos Aires National Academy of Medicine

== See also ==
- National academy
