= Academy of sciences =

National academy or learned society

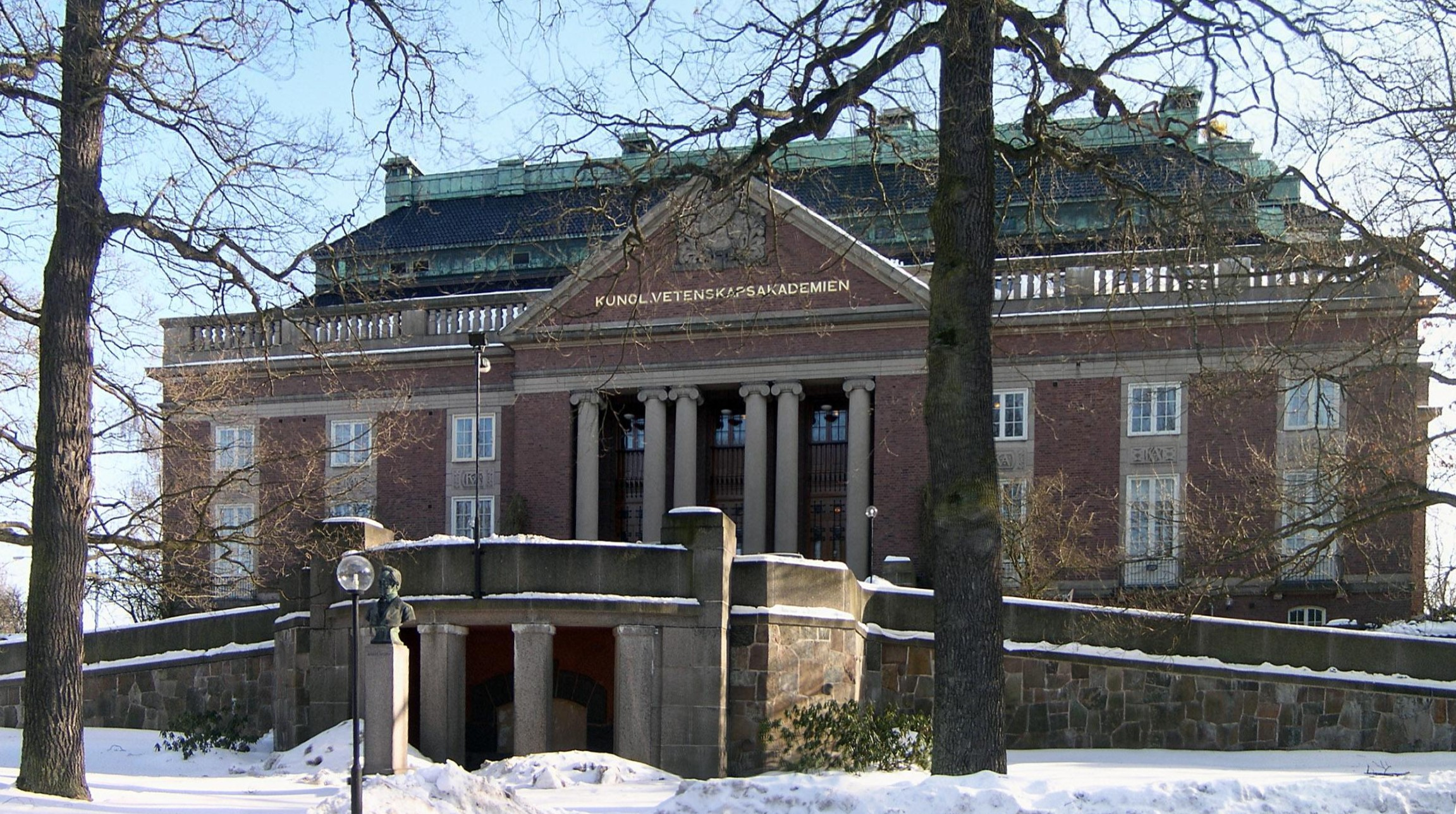
Main building of the Royal Swedish Academy of Sciences in Stockholm

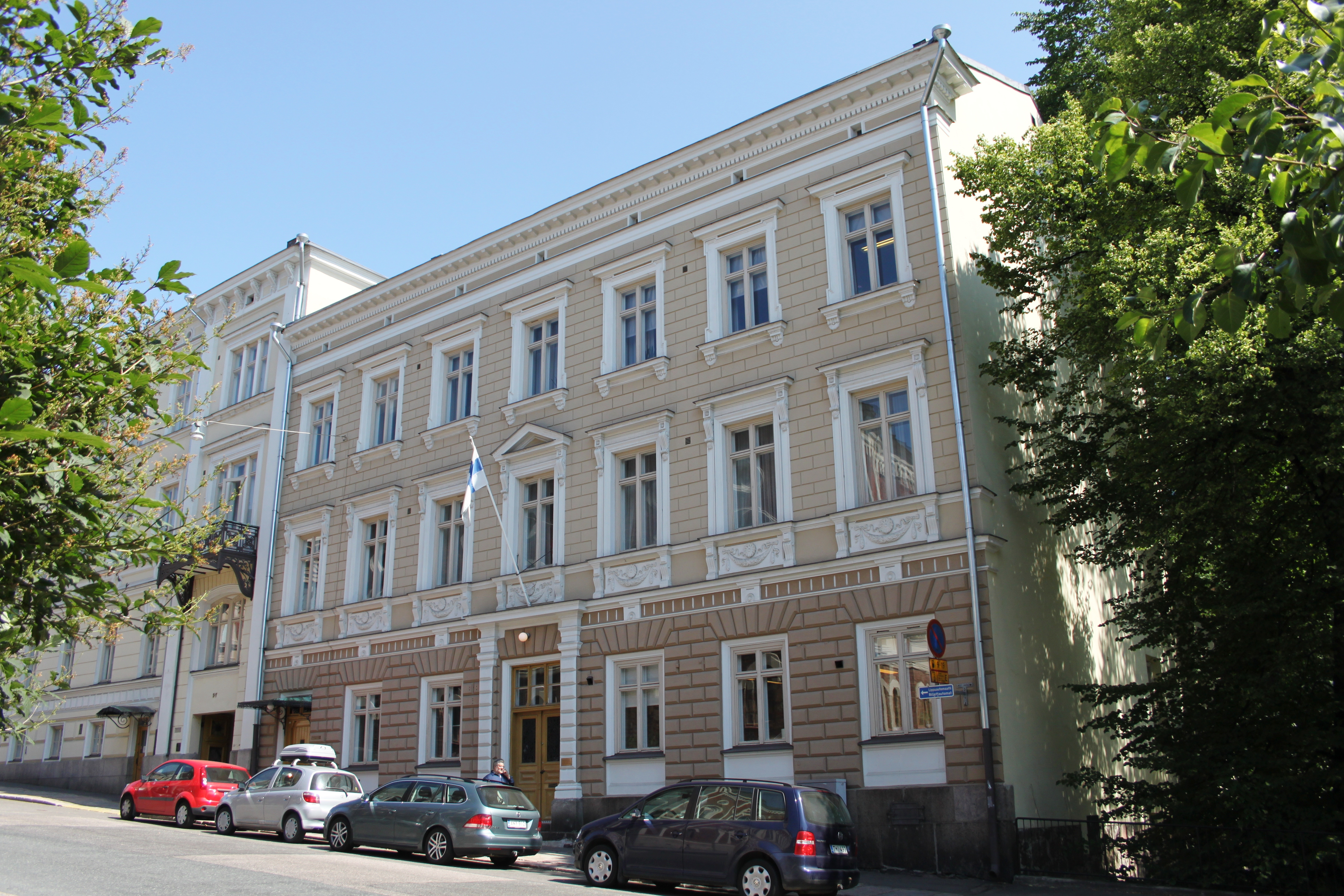
The Finnish Academy of Science and Letters along the Mariankatu street in Helsinki

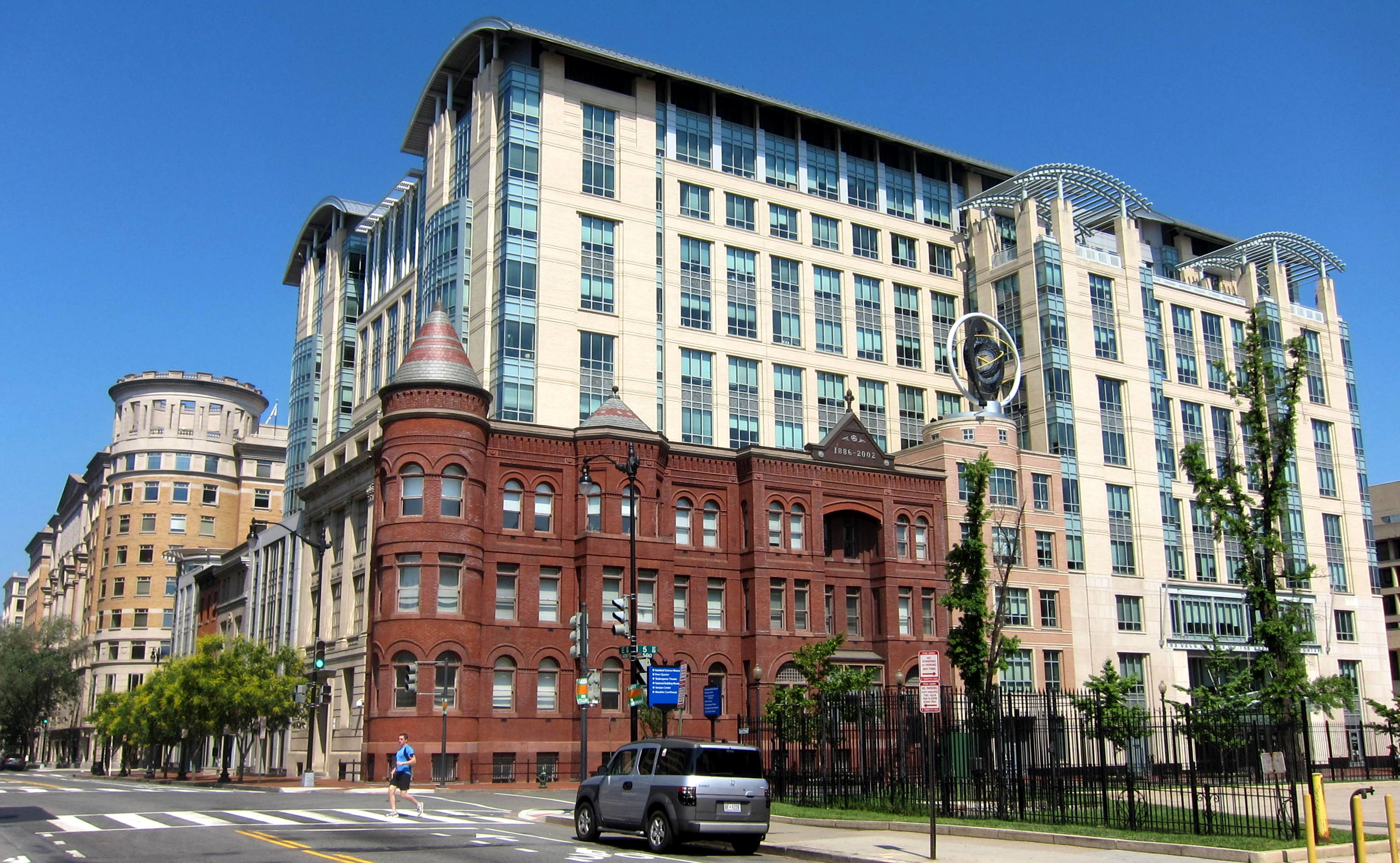
The Keck Center of the National Academies in Washington, D.C., one of several facilities where the National Academy of Sciences maintains offices

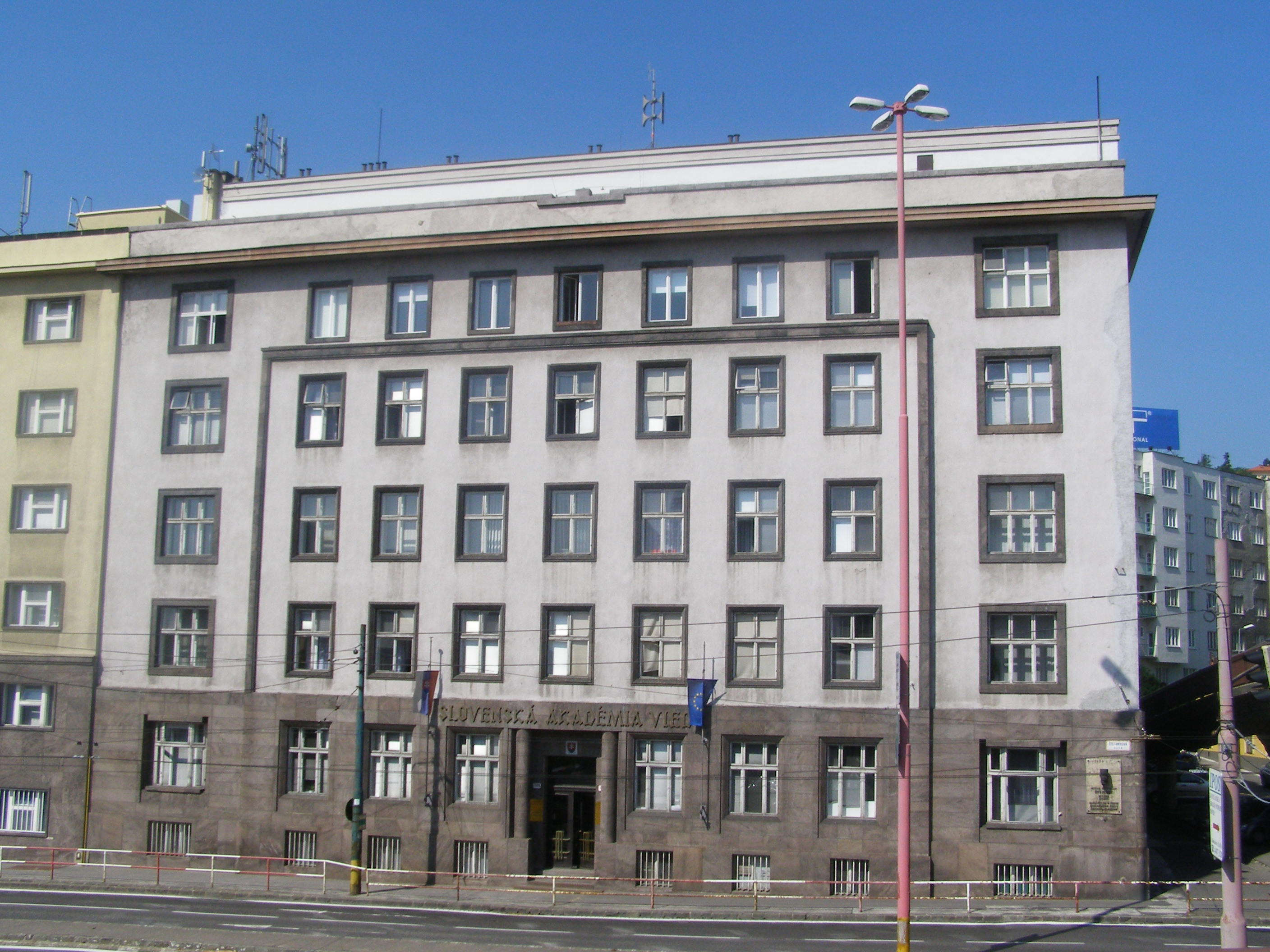
Slovak Academy of Sciences (Presidium Building)

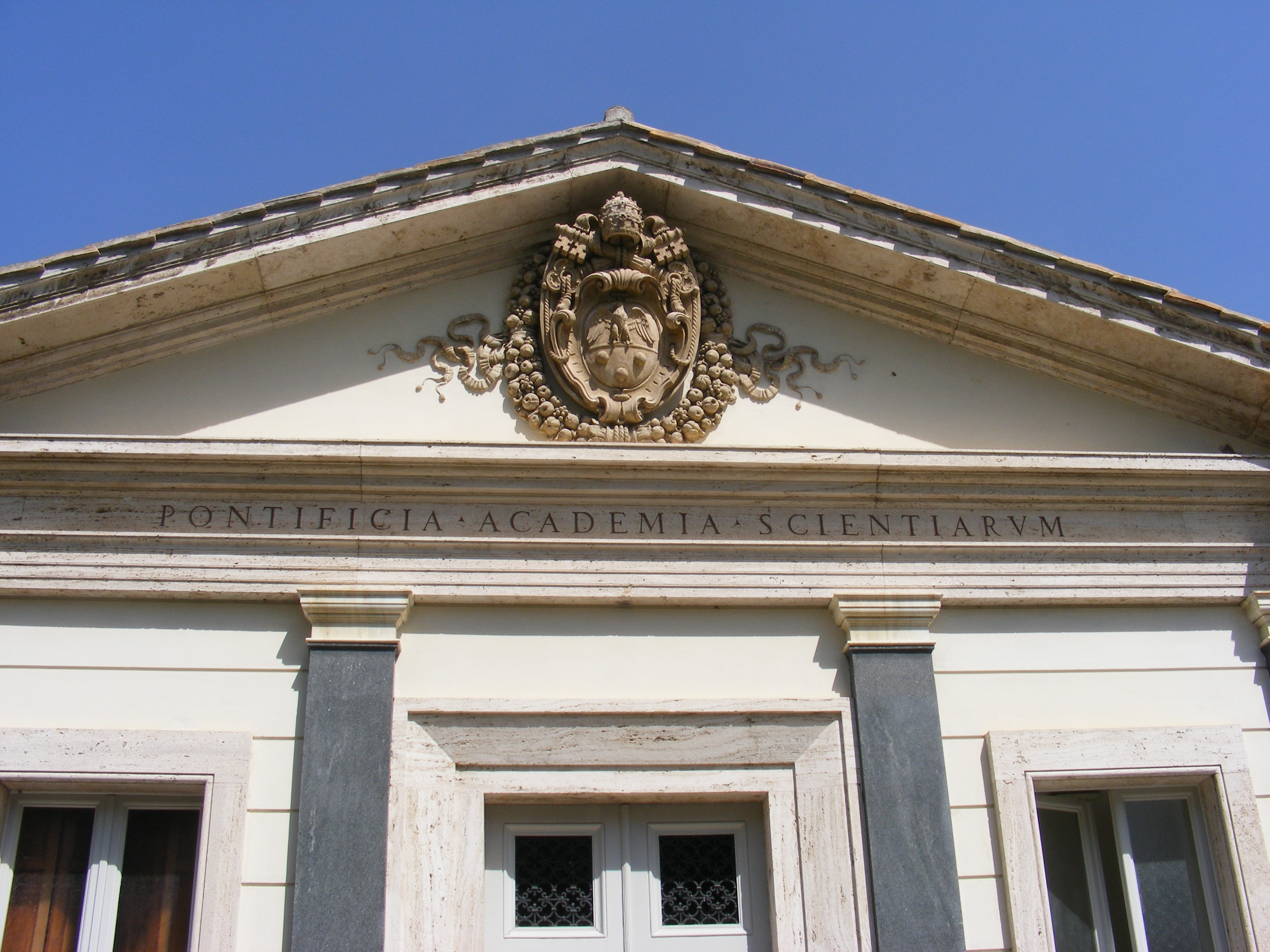
Entrance of the Pontifical Academy of Sciences

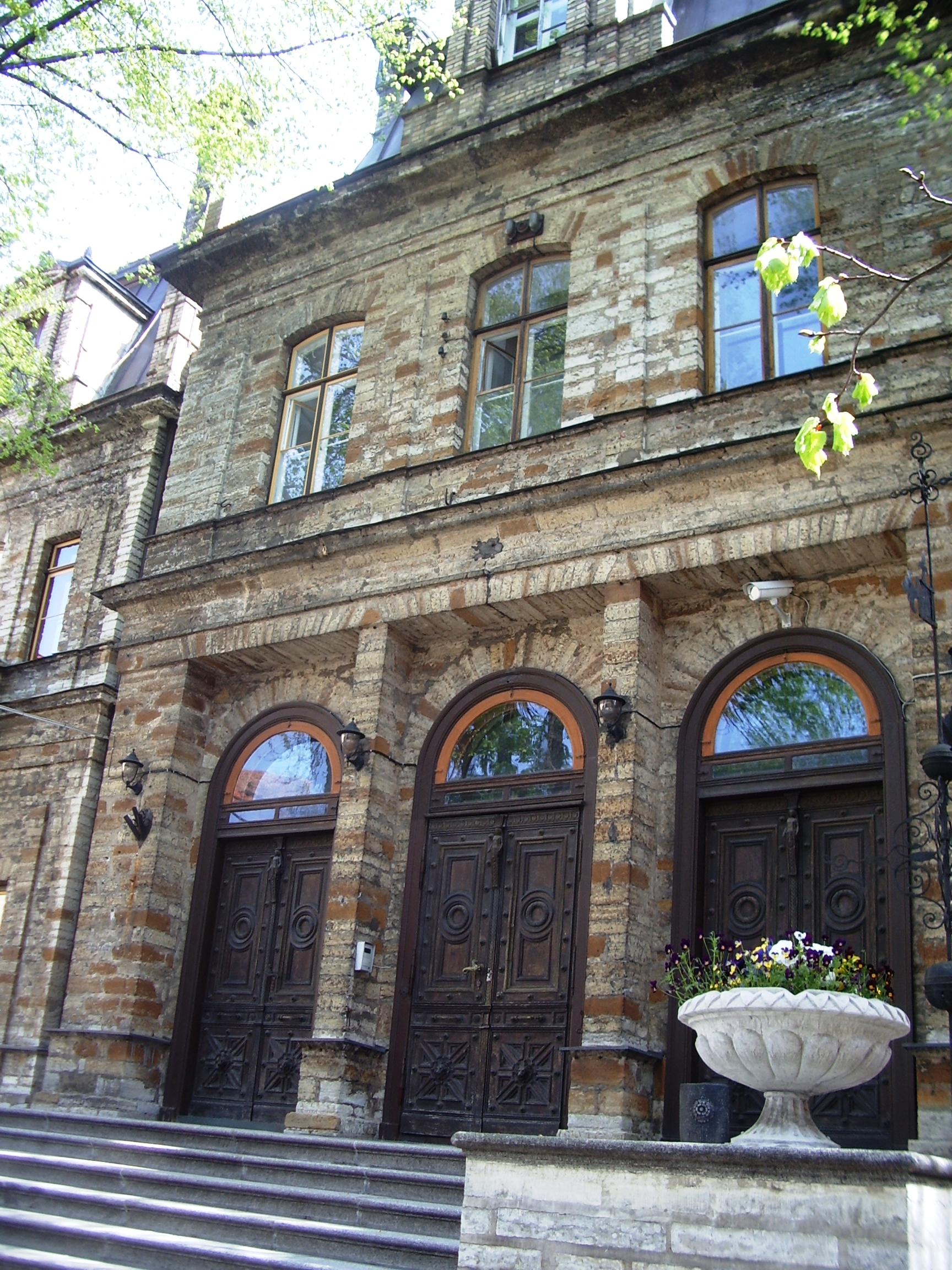
Ungern-Sternberg palace on Toompea, nowadays the main building of Estonian Academy of Sciences

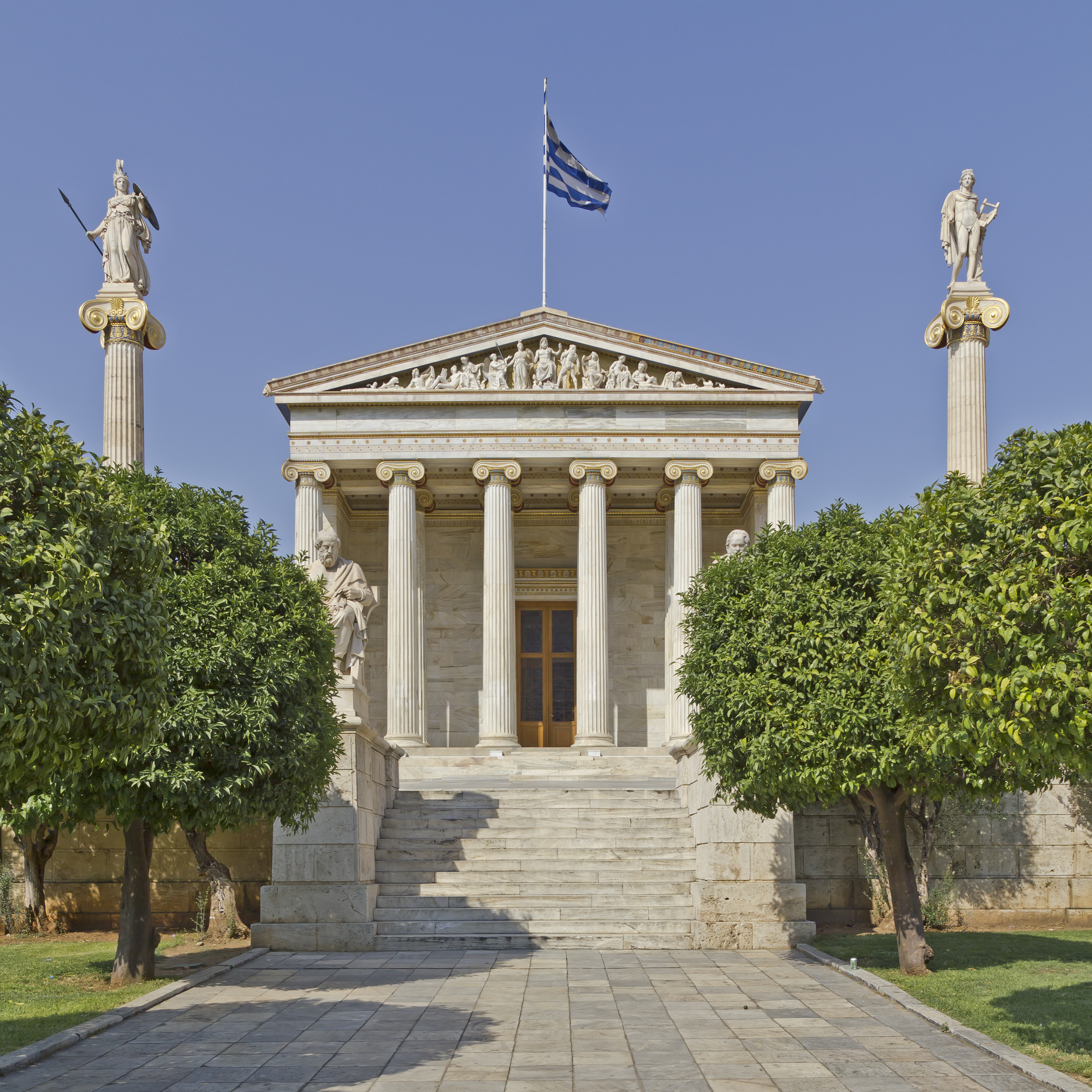
The main building of the Academy of Athens, located in central Athens, Greece

An academy of sciences is a type of learned society or academy (as special scientific institution) dedicated to sciences that may or may not be state funded. Some state funded academies are national, or royal (i.e. United Kingdom's Royal Society of London for Improving Natural Knowledge) as a form of honor.

The other type of academies are Academy of Arts or combination of both (e.g., American Academy of Arts and Sciences). Academy of Letters is another related expression, encompassing literature. In non-English-speaking countries, the range of academic fields of the members of a national Academy of Science often includes scholarly disciplines which would not normally be classed as "science" in English. Many languages use a broad term for systematized learning which includes both natural sciences and social sciences and fields such as literary studies, linguistics, history, or art history. (Often these terms are calques from Latin scientia (the etymological source of English science) and, accordingly, derivatives of the verb 'know', such as German Wissenschaft, Swedish vetenskap, Hungarian tudomány, Estonian teadus or Finnish tiede.) Accordingly, for example the Austrian Academy of Sciences (Österreichische Akademie der Wissenschaften), the Hungarian Academy of Sciences (Magyar Tudományos Akadémia), or the Estonian Academy of Sciences (Eesti Teaduste Akadeemia) also cover the areas of social sciences and humanities.

As the engineering sciences have become more varied and advanced, there is a recent trend in many advanced countries to organize the National Academy of Engineering (or National Academy of Engineering Sciences), separate from the national academy of sciences.

Academies of science play an important role in science diplomacy efforts. Academies are increasingly organized in regional or even international academies. The Interacademy Partnership for example is a global network consisting of over 140 national, regional and global member academies of science, engineering and medicine. Pan-Europe academies include the Academia Europaea and the European Academy of Sciences and Arts. Additionally, there are many regional associations such as ALLEA in Europe, NASAC as the Network of African Science Academies, IANAS in Latin America, and AASSA in Asia. The International Science Council brings together international scientific unions and associations as well as national and regional scientific organizations such as academies and research councils from the natural sciences, social sciences and the humanities.

Apart from national academies of science, there are now increasingly also national young academies. National young academies usually select members for a limited term, normally 4–5 years, after which members become academy alumni. Young academies typically engage with issues important to young scientists. These include, for example, science education or the dialog between science and society. Most young academies are affiliated with a senior Academy of Sciences or with a network of senior academies. The Global Young Academy, which itself is a science academy (e.g. full member of Interacademy Partnership) often serves as a facilitator of the growing global network of young academies. Since its creation, more than 35 national young academies have been established. In 2019, there were 41 national young academies.

== List ==
- World
  - Developing world – The World Academy of Sciences (TWAS)
  - Academy – World Academy of Art and Science
  - International Science Council
- Europe
  - Academia Europaea
  - European Academy of Sciences and Arts
- ASEAN – ASEAN Academy of Engineering and Technology
- Afghanistan – Academy of Sciences of Afghanistan
- Albania – Academy of Sciences of Albania
- Argentina – National Academy of Sciences of Argentina
- Armenia – National Academy of Sciences of Armenia
- Austria – Austrian Academy of Sciences
- Australia – Australian Academy of Science
- Azerbaijan – National Academy of Sciences of Azerbaijan
- Bangladesh – Bangladesh Academy of Sciences
- Belarus – National Academy of Sciences of Belarus
- Belgium – Royal Academies for Science and the Arts of Belgium
- Bosnia and Herzegovina – Academy of Sciences and Arts of Bosnia and Herzegovina
- Brazil – Brazilian Academy of Sciences
- Bulgaria – Bulgarian Academy of Sciences
- Canada
  - Royal Society of Canada
  - Canadian Academy of Engineering
- China
  - Chinese Academy of Sciences
  - Chinese Academy of Engineering
  - Chinese Academy of Social Sciences
- Costa Rica – Academia Nacional de Ciencias (Costa Rica)
- Croatia – Croatian Academy of Sciences and Arts
- Czech Republic – Czech Academy of Sciences
- Denmark – Royal Danish Academy of Sciences and Letters
- Estonia – Estonian Academy of Sciences
- Finland
  - Finnish Society of Sciences and Letters
  - Finnish Academy of Science and Letters
- France – French Academy of Sciences
- Georgia
  - Georgian National Academy of Sciences
  - Abkhazian Regional Academy of Sciences
- Germany
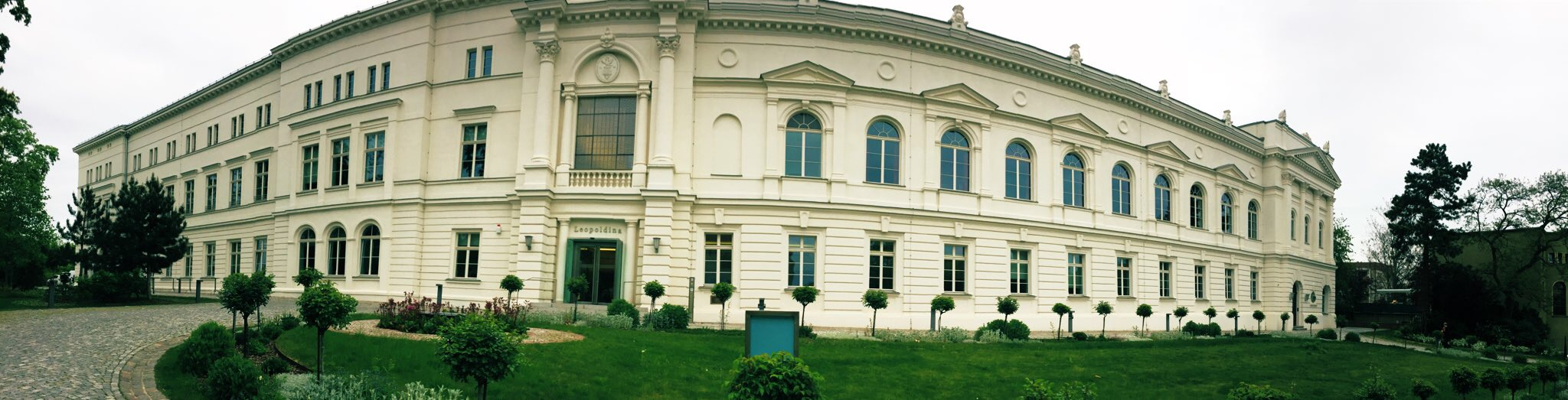
  Academy of Sciences Leopoldina in Germany
  - German National Academy of Sciences Leopoldina
  - Union of Regional German Academies of Sciences and Humanities:
    - Akademie der Wissenschaften und der Literatur
    - Academy of Sciences and Humanities in Hamburg
    - Bavarian Academy of Sciences and Humanities
    - Berlin-Brandenburg Academy of Sciences and Humanities
    - Göttingen Academy of Sciences and Humanities
    - Heidelberg Academy for Sciences and Humanities
    - Saxon Academy of Sciences and Humanities
  - acatech
- Ghana – Ghana Academy of Arts and Sciences
- Greece – Academy of Athens
- Hong Kong
  - Hong Kong Academy of Sciences
  - Hong Kong Academy of Engineering
  - Hong Kong Academy of the Humanities
  - International Core Academy of Sciences and Humanities
- Hungary – Hungarian Academy of Sciences
- India
  - Indian Academy of Sciences
  - Indian National Science Academy
  - National Academy of Sciences, India
- Indonesia
  - Indonesian Institute of Sciences
  - Indonesian Academy of Sciences
- Iran – Academy of Sciences of Iran
- Italy
  - Lincean Academy
  - Accademia Pontaniana
  - Accademia Cosentina
  - Accademia Nazionale delle Scienze (detta dei XL)
  - Accademia Nazionale Virgiliana di Scienze Lettere ed Arti
  - Istituto Lombardo Accademia di Scienze e Lettere
- Israel – Israel Academy of Sciences and Humanities
- Japan
  - Science Council of Japan
  - Japan Academy
- Kazakhstan – National Academy of Sciences of the Republic of Kazakhstan
- Kosovo – Kosova Academy of Sciences and Arts
- Kyrgyzstan – National Academy of Sciences of the Kyrgyz Republic
- Latvia – Latvian Academy of Sciences
- Lebanon – Lebanese Academy of Sciences
- Liechtenstein - Naturwissenschaftliches Forum
- Lithuania – Lithuanian Academy of Sciences
- Malaysia – Akademi Sains Malaysia
- Mexico – Mexican Academy of Sciences
- Moldova – Academy of Sciences of Moldova
- Mongolia – Mongolian Academy of Sciences
- Montenegro
  - Montenegrin Academy of Sciences and Arts
  - Doclean Academy of Sciences and Arts
- Morocco – Hassan II Academy of Sciences and Technologies
- Nepal – Nepal Academy of Science and Technology
- Netherlands – Royal Netherlands Academy of Sciences
- New Zealand – Royal Society of New Zealand
- Nigeria – Nigerian Academy of Science
- North Korea – Academy of Sciences of the Democratic People's Republic of Korea
- North Macedonia – Macedonian Academy of Sciences and Arts
- Norway
  - Norwegian Academy of Science and Letters
  - Royal Norwegian Society of Science and Letters
  - Norwegian Academy of Technological Sciences
- Pakistan – Pakistan Academy of Sciences
- Philippines - National Academy of Science and Technology
- Poland
  - Polish Academy of Sciences
  - Polish Academy of Learning
- Portugal
  - Lisbon Academy of Sciences
  - Lisbon Geographic Society
- Romania – Romanian Academy
- Russia – Russian Academy of Sciences
- San Marino – International Academy of Sciences San Marino
- Serbia – Serbian Academy of Sciences and Arts
- Singapore – Singapore National Academy of Science
- Slovakia – Slovak Academy of Sciences
- Slovenia – Slovenian Academy of Sciences and Arts
- South Africa
  - Academy of Science of South Africa
  - Royal Society of South Africa
  - Suid-Afrikaanse Akademie vir Wetenskap en Kuns
- South Korea – National Academy of Sciences, Republic of Korea
- Soviet Union – Soviet Academy of Sciences
- Spain – Spanish Royal Academy of Sciences
- Sri Lanka – National Academy of Sciences of Sri Lanka
- Sweden – Royal Swedish Academy of Sciences
- Switzerland – Swiss Academies of Arts and Sciences
- Taiwan – Academia Sinica
- Thailand – Royal Institute of Thailand
- Turkey – Turkish Academy of Sciences
- Ukraine – National Academy of Sciences of Ukraine
- United Kingdom
  - Royal Society
  - Royal Academy of Engineering
  - Academy of Medical Sciences
  - British Academy
  - Scotland – Royal Society of Edinburgh
- United States
  - National Academies
    - U.S. National Academy of Sciences
    - U.S. National Academy of Engineering
    - U.S. National Academy of Medicine formerly the Institute of Medicine
    - National Research Council
    - National Association of Academy of Sciences (NAAS)
  - American Academy of Arts and Sciences
  - State-specific
    - California – California Academy of Sciences
    - Connecticut - Connecticut Academy of Science and Engineering
    - Missouri – Academy of Science, St. Louis
    - New York – New York Academy of Sciences
    - Pennsylvania - Pennsylvania Academy of Science
    - Vermont – Vermont Academy of Arts and Sciences
- Vatican City – Pontifical Academy of Sciences
- Jordan and the Islamic world – Islamic World Academy of Sciences (IAS)

== See also ==
- National academy
