= National Academy of Engineering (disambiguation) =

The National Academy of Engineering most commonly refers to the academy in the United States.

National Academy of Engineering may also refer to:

- Australian Academy of Technology and Engineering
- Canadian Academy of Engineering
- Chinese Academy of Engineering
- Hong Kong Academy of Engineering Sciences
- Indian National Academy of Engineering
- National Academy of Engineering of Korea
- Royal Academy of Engineering of Spain
- Royal Swedish Academy of Engineering Sciences
- Royal Academy of Engineering (United Kingdom)
- Russian Academy of Engineering
- South African Academy of Engineering

== See also ==
- French Academy of Technologies
- Norwegian Academy of Technological Sciences
