= Academy of the Kingdom of Morocco =

- Formation: 1977
- Purpose: National academy of Morocco
- Headquarters: Rabat
- Location: Morocco
- Website: alacademia.org.ma

The Academy of the Kingdom of Morocco (in Arabic : أكاديمية المملكة المغربية; in amazigh : ⵜⴰⴳⴰⴷⵉⵎⵉⵢⵜ ⵏ ⵜⴳⵍⴷⵉⵜ ⵏ ⵍⵎⵖⵔⵉⴱ) is a scholarly national academy based in Rabat. It was founded on 8 October 1977 by the king Hassan II with the objective of contributing to the development and promotion of scientific research, particularly in the fields of humanities, culture and arts. The site of the academy, located along Avenue Mohammed VI, south of Rabat, is adjoining that of the other Moroccan academic institution: the Hassan II Academy of Sciences and Technologies, specialized in exact, natural and technical sciences.

The academy has sixty members: thirty resident members, of Moroccan nationality, and thirty associate members, of other nationalities.

In 2021, the Academy of the Kingdom of Morocco was reorganized by law n° 74-19 promulgated by dahir n° 1-21-02 of February 5, 2021. It now includes three institutes: the Higher Academic Authority for Translation; the Academic Arts' Institute and the Royal Institute of Research on the History of Morocco.

== Structure ==
Since 2015, the perpetual secretary of the academy is Abdeljalil Lahjomri, who is also the director of the Royal College.
