= International Council of Academies of Engineering and Technological Sciences =

The International Council of Academies of Engineering and Technological Sciences (CAETS) is organisation of engineering and technological sciences academies.

== History ==
CAETS was founded in 1978 by the Australian Academy of Technological Sciences and Engineering, the Royal Academy of Engineering, the Academy of Engineering of Mexico, the US National Academy of Engineering, and the Royal Swedish Academy of Engineering Sciences. CAETS is incorporated as a 501(c)(3) non-profit corporation in the District of Columbia, US.

From 1985 until 2000 the name "Council of Academies of Engineering and Technological Sciences" (CAETS) was used.

As of 2022, CAETS has 31 member academies.

== Organisation ==
CAETS has a council that meets annually, a board of directors and executive committee. Directors have included Denis Ranque, Neven Duić, and Ruth David.

=== Member academies ===
Country	Academy	Elected to CAETS	Notes
Argentina	Academia Nacional de Ingenieria (ANI)	1999	
Australia	Australian Academy of Technology and Engineering (ATSE)	1978	Founding member.
Belgium	Royal Belgian Academy Council of Applied Sciences (BACAS)	1990	
Canada	Canadian Academy of Engineering (CAE)	1991	
China	Chinese Academy of Engineering (CAE)	1997	
Croatia	Croatian Academy of Engineering (HATZ)	2000	
Czech Republic	Engineering Academy of the Czech Republic	1999	
Denmark	Danish Academy of Technical Sciences (ATV)	1987	
Finland	Council of Finnish Academies (CoFA)	1989	
France	National Academy of Technologies of France (NATF)	1989	
Germany	National Academy of Science and Engineering (acatech)	2005	
Hungary	Hungarian Academy of Engineering (HAE)	1995	
India	Indian National Academy of Engineering (INAE)	1999	
Ireland	Irish Academy of Engineering (IAE)	2020	
Japan	Engineering Academy of Japan (EAJ)	1990	
Korea	National Academy of Engineering of Korea (NAEK)	2000	
Mexico	Academy of Engineering of Mexico (AIM)	1978	Founding member.
Netherlands	Netherlands Academy of Technology and Innovation (AcTI)	1993	
New Zealand	Royal Society Te Apārangi (RSNZ)	2019	
Nigeria	Nigerian Academy of Engineering (NAE)	2019	
Norway	Norwegian Academy of Technological Sciences	1990	
Pakistan	Pakistan Academy of Engineering (PAE)	2018	
Serbia	Academy of Engineering Sciences of Serbia (AESS)	2019	
Slovenia	Slovenian Academy of Engineering (IAS)	2000	
South Africa	South African Academy of Engineering (SAAE)	2009	
Spain	Real Academia de Ingenieria (RAI)	1999	
Sweden	Royal Swedish Academy of Engineering Sciences (IVA)	1978	Founding member.
Switzerland	Swiss Academy of Engineering Sciences (SATW)	1988	
United Kingdom	Royal Academy of Engineering (RAEng)	1978	Founding member.
United States	National Academy of Engineering (NAE)	1978	Founding member.
Uruguay	National Academy of Engineering of Uruguay	2000	

== Statements ==
In October 2007, CAETS issued a Statement on Environment and Sustainable Growth:

As reported by the Intergovernmental Panel on Climate Change (IPCC), most of the observed global warming since the mid-20th century is very likely due to human-produced emission of greenhouse gases and this warming will continue unabated if present anthropogenic emissions continue or, worse, expand without control.

CAETS, therefore, endorses the many recent calls to decrease and control greenhouse gas emissions to an acceptable level as quickly as possible.

In following years, CAETS has issued statements:

2008: Delta Technology for a Sustainable and Habitable Planet
2009: Global Natural Resources – Management and Sustainability
2010: Sustainable Food Systems – Toward Food for All
2011: Engineering Analysis and Management to Reduce Risks
2012: Urban Development and Public Transportation: Improved Understanding of the Interdependencies
2013: Educating Engineers
2014: Engineering and the Future of Humankind
2015: Pathways to Sustainability in the Energy, Mobility and Health Care Sectors
2018: Sustainable Development of Agricultural and Forestry Systems
2019: Engineering a Better World – The Next 100 Years
2020: Engineering a Better World – Smart Society
2021: CAETS Statement on COP26
2022: CAETS Statement on Invasion of Ukraine
