= Manuel Pizarro Moreno =

Spanish lawyer (born 1951)

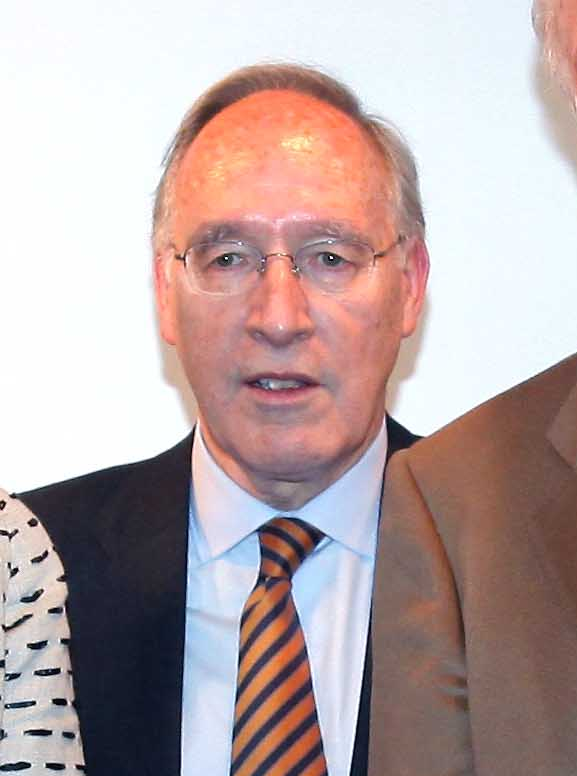

Member of the Congress of Deputies (Spain)
- In office 2008 – 29 January 2010
- Constituency: Madrid

President of Endesa

Personal details
- Born: September 29, 1951 (age 75) Teruel, Spain
- Party: People's Party
- Education: Complutense University of Madrid
- Occupation: Economist, Jurist, Lawyer, Exchange agent

Manuel Amador Miguel Pizarro Moreno (born Teruel, September 29, 1951) is an economist, Spanish jurist, Lawyer of the State, exchange agent and stock exchange and former president of Endesa. He is academic of number of the Royal Academy of Jurisprudence and Legislation, of the Royal Academy of Economic and Financial Sciences and of the Aragonese Academy of Jurisprudence and Legislation.

Pizarro was also deputy of the Congress for the People's Party, between 2008 and January 29, 2010, when he left his seat as well as active politics.

== Biography ==
Manuel Pizarro Moreno was born in Teruel on September 29, 1951. His grandfather, the General of the Civil Guard Manuel Pizarro Cenjor, was appointed civil governor of Granada, after the civil war and in 1947 of Teruel, a position he held until 1954 when he died, a period in which his main task was the fight against the maquis in the area. His father, Manuel Pizarro Indart was a procurator in the Spanish Parliament for the family Tercio between 1967 and 1971 for the province of Teruel, and one of the 19 procurators who voted "NO" to the designation of Prince Juan Carlos I of Spain as successor to the head of state.

Manuel Pizarro studied law at the Complutense University of Madrid, graduating in 1973. In 1978, he successfully competed for the position of State Attorney. His first assignment in the Administration was at the Tax and Courts Delegation of Tarragona in 1979, before moving to his hometown.

After moving to Madrid, he held the positions of Deputy Director General of Cooperation with the Autonomous Communities and Technical Secretary General, both in the Ministry of Territorial Administration. Finally, in the Ministry of Economy he became legal advisor to the Secretary of State for Economy and deputy general director of Expropriations of the General Directorate of Patrimony, holding this position during the expropriation of Rumasa.

In 1987 he began working as a stockbroker, leaving the public sector and entering the financial world. He worked at the Madrid Stock Exchange since 1991, being appointed vice-president in December 1995. In November 1995, he was appointed Chairman of Ibercaja, remaining in the position until 2004. Between 1998 and 2002, during his chairmanship of Ibercaja, he was also appointed chairman of the Spanish Confederation of Savings Banks (CECA).
