= Richmond Academy =

Richmond Academy may refer to:

- Academy of Richmond County
- Richmond Academy of Medicine
