= Ruth A. David =

American engineer

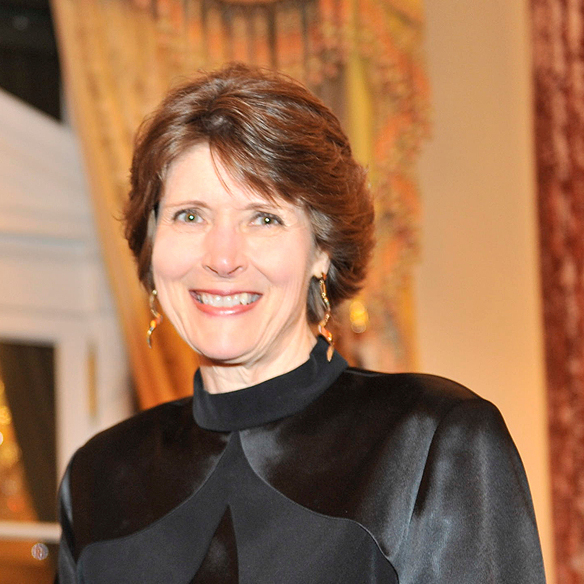
- David in 2014
- Born: May 13, 1953 (age 72); Arkansas City, Kansas
- Occupation: electrical engineer
- Years active: 1975-present
- Known for: reorganizing the CIA intelligence technology system
- Spouse: Stanley E. Dains

Ruth A. David (born 1953) is an American engineer. While at the CIA, David was responsible for encouraging the agency to pursue partnerships with the private sector and designed a proposal to procure technology at the stage of development from the private sector. She has been awarded the CIA Director's Award, the Defense Intelligence Agency Director's Award, the CIA Distinguished Intelligence Medal, the National Reconnaissance Officer's Award for Distinguished Service, and the National Security Agency Distinguished Service Medal.

== Early life ==
Ruth A. David was born on May 13, 1953, in Arkansas City, Kansas. After attaining a BS in electrical engineering from Wichita State University in 1975, she went on to earn a master's in 1976 and PhD in 1981 in electrical engineering from Stanford University.

== Career ==
David began her career in 1975 holding several positions at the Sandia National Laboratories in Albuquerque, New Mexico. She served as an adjunct professor at the University of New Mexico teaching adaptive and digital signal, digital and microprocessor system design, and linear least-squares estimation. In 1986, she was employed as the supervisor of the Data Systems Development Organization, responsible for developing a remote controlled digital system for deployment of underground nuclear tests at the Nevada Test Site. Three years later she transferred to the Federal Aviation Administration managing the Department of Non-Destructive Test, Electromagnetic Test and Optics program on aging aircraft.

Between 1991 and 1994, David was Director of the Development Testing Center, supervising a broad spectrum of engineering test facilities. In 1995, she was appointed Deputy Director for Science and Technology of the Central Intelligence Agency and became responsible for advising the agency on science and technology. In this capacity, she proposed a radical new approach for the agency to deal with the swift growth in information with the internet revolution. Rather than procuring technology after it was developed, David and her deputy, Joanne Isham recognized and pushed for the agency to pursue partnerships within the private sector. As technology was advancing far faster than the government bureaucracy procurement program could secure new innovation, they proposed that technology be obtained at the stage of development from the private sector. She recommended utilizing technology to streamline processes and move away from simply collecting data toward a more analytical and leveraged position of disseminating and exploiting information.

In 1998, when David left the CIA, she was awarded the CIA Director's Award, the Defense Intelligence Agency Director's Award, the CIA Distinguished Intelligence Medal, the National Reconnaissance Officer's Award for Distinguished Service, and the National Security Agency Distinguished Service Medal. That same year, David joined ANSER (formerly Analytic Services, Inc.) as its President and Chief Executive Officer. At ANSER, she provided analysis and research as a public service for national and transnational security issues. In 1999, she developed Homeland Defense Strategic Thrust to focus research into internal and external terrorist entities and hostile nations and expanded the department to the ANSER Institute of Homeland Security in 2001 to provide public awareness and education on national security.

David was elected a member of the National Academy of Engineering in 2002 for pioneering the use of digital information technologies for testing, simulations, information processing, and telecommunications for high-capacity, high-reliability applications.

In 2010, David was inducted into the Women in Technology International Hall of Fame. She was appointed by President Obama as a member of the National Science Board and National Science Foundation in 2012. David retired from ANSER in 2015. Still, Ruth David remains active as a permanent Secretary/Treasurer of International Council of Academies of Engineering and Technological Sciences.
