= Royal National Academy of Pharmacy (Spain) =

Coordinates: 40.4241°N 3.6997°W

- Real Academia Nacional de Farmacia
- Arms of the Royal National Academy of Pharmacy
- Abbreviation: RANF
- Formation: 21 August 1737; 289 years ago
- Type: academy
- Purpose: To research and study of pharmaceutical sciences and its related areas
- Location: Madrid, Spain
- Region served: Spain
- Protector: Felipe VI (as King of Spain)
- President: Antonio Luis Doadrio Villarejo (since 2019)
- Parent organization: Institute of Spain
- Website: ranf.com

The Royal National Academy of Pharmacy (Spanish: Real Academia Nacional de Farmacia) is a learned society located in Madrid, Spain. It is focused on research and study in the sphere of pharmacy, as well as advising national and international authorities. Its headquarters were declared Bien de Interés Cultural in 1997.

The royal academy dates back to 1737, when Felipe V established the "Royal College of Apothecaries of Madrid". The institution was formed from two old brotherhoods of Madrid apothecaries: Nuestra Señora San Lucas and Nuestra Señora de la Purificación, existing since 1589, and Nuestra Señora de los Desamparados, founded in 1654. Its current name dates back to the 1930s and was integrated in the Institute of Spain in 1946, in its first expansion, along with the Royal Academy of Jurisprudence and Legislation.
