= Josefina Gómez Mendoza =

Spanish geographer, writer and teacher

The Most Excellent Josefina Gómez Mendoza
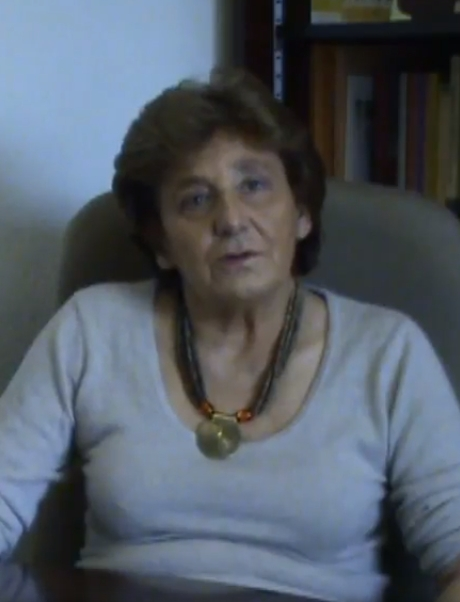
- Gómez Mendoza in 2011
- Born: 1 June 1942 (age 84); Madrid, Spain
- Education: Complutense University of Madrid
- Occupation: Academic
- Organizations: Royal Academy of History; Royal Academy of Engineering
- Awards: Grand Cross of the Civil Order of Alfonso X, the Wise (2002); Gold Medal of Merit in Labour (2008)
- Website: josefinagomezmendoza.com

Josefina Gómez Mendoza (born 1 June 1942) is a Spanish geographer, writer, and professor emerita. From 2001 to 2005, she was Rector of the National University of Distance Education (UNED). She is a member of the Royal Academy of History, Medal No. 7 (elected 8 February 2002, took office 27 April 2003), and the Royal Academy of Engineering, Medal No. 58 (took office 21 March 2006).

== Career ==
Josefina Gómez Mendoza holds a licentiate in Philosophy and Literature from History Department at the Complutense University of Madrid (1974), as well as a Doctorate in Philosophy and Literature from the same university's History and Geography Department.

In 1978, she was assistant professor of geography by examination, and in 1979 she was an associate professor. In 1981 she won the access competition for the Geography Chair of Spain.

From 1985 to 2012, she was Professor of Regional Geographical Analysis at the Autonomous University of Madrid.

In June 2005, she was named Doctor Honoris Causa of the Charles III University of Madrid and invested on 3 February 2006.

In September 2012, she was appointed Chair Emerita at the Autonomous University of Madrid. That October she was also named Professor Emerita of the Autonomous University, and that November she was named Doctor Honoris Causa by the École normale supérieure de Lyon.

Gómez Mendoza was an elective State Councilor from 2003 to 2008 and from 2008 to 2013. She has been a Member of the National Council of National Parks since 2008.

She was President of the Association of Spanish Geographers from 1993 to 1997.

In addition to publishing several books, she has written for some media outlets, including the newspaper El País.

== Books ==
- 1977, Agricultura y expansión urbana: la campiña del bajo Henares en la aglomeración de Madrid, ISBN 9788420621920
- 1982, El pensamiento geográfico: estudio interpretativo y antología de textos
- 1982, Viajeros y paisajes
- 1992, Ciencia y política de los montes españoles (1848–1936)
- 1999, Los paisajes de Madrid (Naturaleza y Medio Rural), ISBN 9788420644882

== Awards and honors ==
- 1998: Gold Medal of the Autonomous University of Madrid
- 2002: Grand Cross of the Civil Order of Alfonso X, the Wise
- 2005: Doctor Honoris Causa of the Charles III University of Madrid
- 2009: Gold Medal for Merit at Work
- 2011: Fernando González Bernáldez Distinction from the González Bernáldez Foundation
- 2012: Doctor Honoris Causa of the École normale supérieure de Lyon
- Diego de Saavedra Fajardo Award for Geography, Economics, Sociology, and Literature
- Ordre des Palmes Académiques
