= Hassan II Academy of Science and Technology =

Organization in Rabat, Morocco

- Formation: 1993
- Type: National academy, Academy of Sciences
- Headquarters: Rabat
- Region served: Morocco
- Permanent secretary: Prof. Omar Fassi-Fehri
- Website: www.academie.hassan2.sciences.ma

The Hassan II Academy of Science and Technology (French: Académie Hassan II des Sciences et Techniques) is a learned society founded in 1993 by the King Hassan II of Morocco.
