= National Academy of Sciences of Argentina =

Science in Argentina

- Academia Nacional de Ciencias
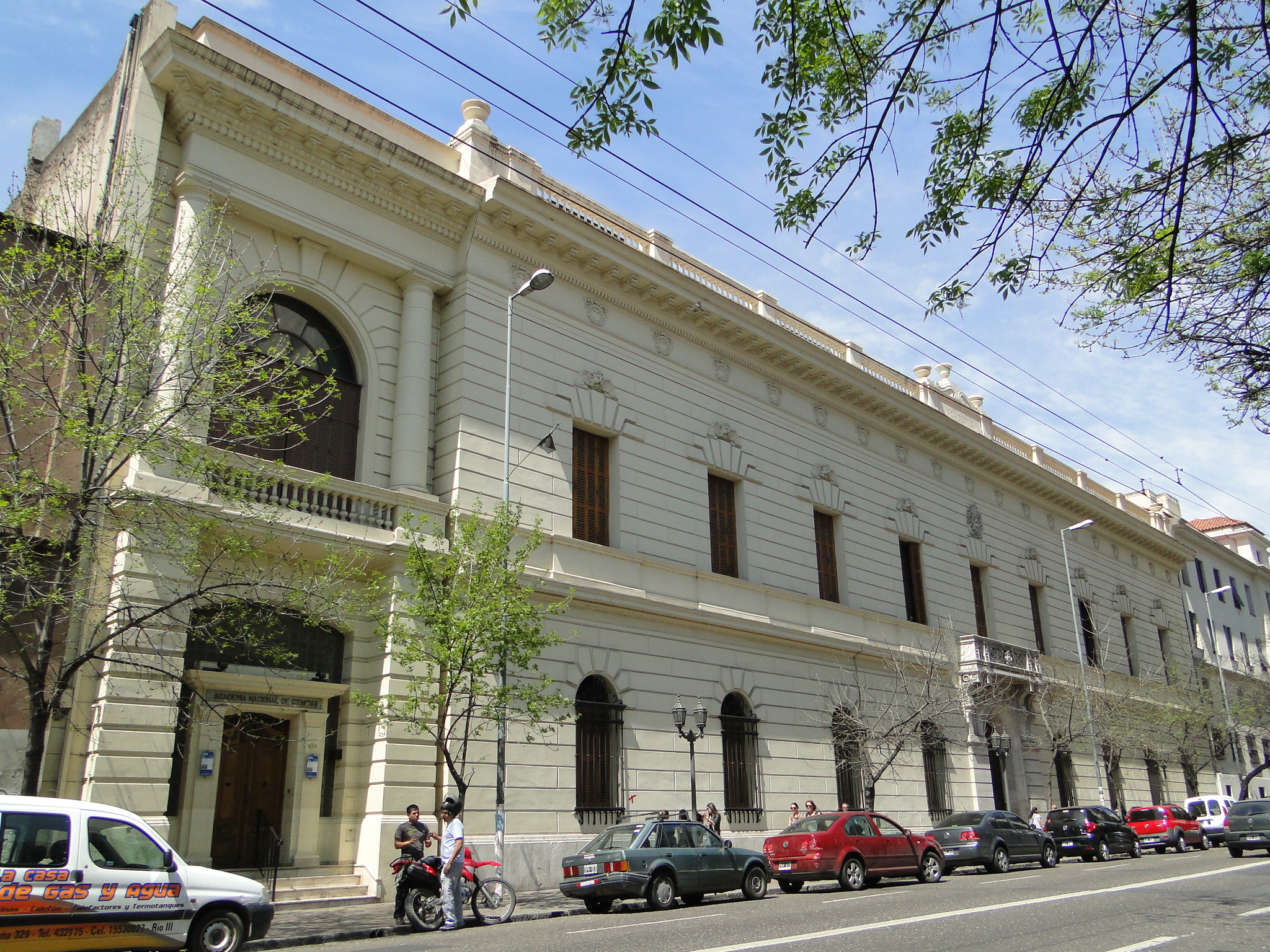
- Main façade of the National Academy of Sciences in Córdoba, Argentina.

Science academy overview
- Formed: 1869; 157 years ago
- Jurisdiction: Government of Argentina
- Headquarters: 31°25′04″S 64°11′16″W
- Science academy executive: Dr. Juan Alfredo Tirao, President
- Website: www.anc-argentina.org.ar

The National Academy of Sciences of Argentina is an organisation tasked with promoting and supporting Argentine scientific and technological policy.

According to its Statute, the academy is led by a Directive Board of sixteen Academy members, who are elected by the vote of all its members residing in the country.

== History ==
National Academy of Sciences of Argentina was created in 1869 by President Domingo Faustino Sarmiento in the city of Cordoba, Argentina, as a scientific corporation supported by the Federal Government. It was the first Academy to be supported by the Federal Government. It was finally consolidated legally in 1878 by presidential decree. Since its inception, the academy has advocated for the development and outreach of exact and natural sciences, the exploration of the Argentine territory and has served as advisor to the National Government, provincial governments and other scientific institutions. The academy also awards prizes, publishes a journal and keeps a library and organizes conferences and other events. The building of the academy was inaugurated in 1897 and was declared a National Historical Monument in 1994.

Many important scientists are or have been members of the academy including: Charles Darwin, Benjamin Gould, Henri Milne-Edwards and, more recently, Argentine Nobel laureates Bernardo Houssay and Luis Leloir.

== See also ==
- National Scientific and Technical Research Council
