= John Lazar (engineer) =

British investor and engineer (born 1959)

Sir John Lazar CBE FREng FBCS
- Education: Wits University (BSc); Oxford University (MSc, DPhil)
- Known for: Engineering, business and investing
- Board member of: Raspberry Pi Foundation

Sir John Wilfred Lazar CBE FREng FBCS (born March 1959) is a British engineer and businessman who is the president of the Royal Academy of Engineering. He spent much of his career at Metaswitch, where he was chairman and CEO, after starting at the company as a software engineer.

Lazar is the chairman for the Raspberry Pi Foundation and co-founder & General Partner at Enza Capital.

== Education and career ==
Lazar graduated in computer science from the University of the Witwatersrand with a BSc in 1982 and a BSc Hons degree in 1983. He then went to Balliol College, Oxford as a Rhodes Scholar where he obtained an MSc in Computation and a DPhil in History.

He began his career in 1987 at Metaswitch, rising through the company and becoming its CEO in 2009, and then chairman in 2015. Metaswitch was an innovator in the Voice over IP and softswitches industries. While its CEO, Metaswitch opened a new technology facility at Cambridge University. Metaswitch built a strong relationship with AT&T as a leader of network virtualization, and also launched the Project Calico, an open source project.

Since leaving his roles at Metaswitch, Lazar has focused heavily on investing in both UK technology companies and also African-based startups through Enza Capital. He also works closely with a number of institutions to support competitions for African startups and engineering innovations. Lazar has also spoken at various summits about the future of engineering. In 2020 he became the chair of the board for the Raspberry Pi Foundation.

== Recognition ==
In 2016, Lazar was appointed a Commander of the Order of the British Empire (CBE) by Queen Elizabeth II in the 2016 Birthday Honours for services to the engineering industry. He was knighted by King Charles III in the 2025 New Year Honours for services to engineering and technology.

In 2010, Lazar was elected a Fellow of the British Computer Society (FBCS). He was elected a Fellow of the Royal Academy of Engineering (FREng) in 2011 and in February 2024 the Academy announced his nomination as its Presidential candidate for election by Fellows at the September 2024 AGM. His appointment was confirmed and he began his five year term in September 2024.
