= Metaswitch =

UK-based technology company

Metaswitch Networks
- Type: Subsidiary
- Industry: Telecommunications
- Founded: 1981; 45 years ago
- Founder: Ian S. Ferguson
- Headquarters: London, United Kingdom
- Number of locations: 11 (2019)
- Key people: Martin Lund (CEO); Tom Cronan (CFO); Ian Maclean (CMO); Roger Heinz (CSO); Alastair Mitchell (EVP Engineering); Dave Reekie (Chief Scientist); Martin Taylor (CTO)
- Products: Virtualized software for service providers, network protocol stacks for equipment manufacturers
- Number of employees: 700 ±50 (2011)
- Parent: Alianza (company) (2025-present)
- Website: www.metaswitch.com

Metaswitch Networks (formerly Data Connection Ltd) is a private UK-based telecommunications software company. It designs, develops, manufactures, and markets telecommunications software to communication service providers, equipment manufacturers, and large enterprises.

After being acquired by Microsoft in July 2020, Metaswitch Networks has been owned by Alianza since March 4, 2025.

== Corporate history ==
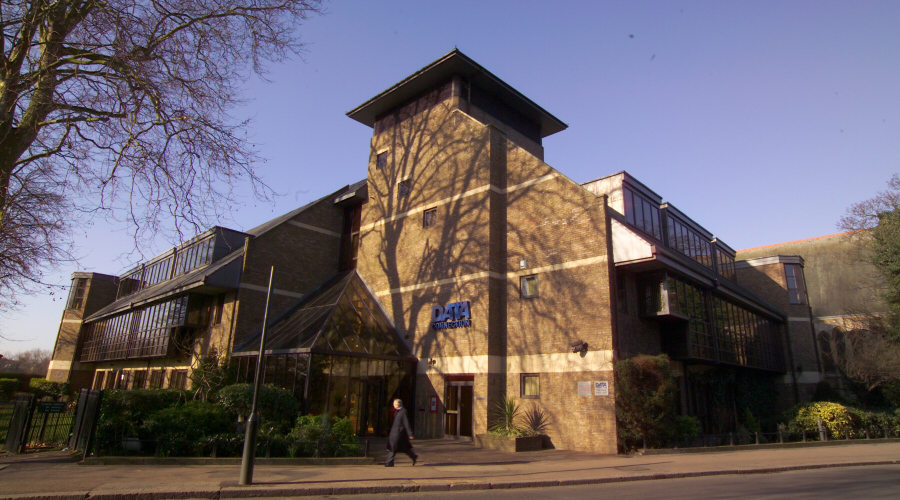
Metaswitch former head office in Enfield, UK

Then known as Data Connection, the firm was founded in 1981 by seven former IBM employees led by Ian Ferguson, who remained on the board of directors until its sale to Microsoft. Their earliest business areas included IBM Systems Network Architecture (SNA) and retail point of sale systems. In the 1990s, the company began developing network protocol software.

In 2000, the company launched the Metaswitch brand, which provided softswitches and network management systems designed to enable telephone service providers to migrate to Voice over IP (VoIP) networks while still supporting legacy telephone technologies. By 2008, the Metaswitch division was responsible for 78% of the company's revenue.

In April 2009, the company announced intentions to consolidate all of its products and business operations under the Metaswitch brand, with two business units: the Carrier Systems Division and Network Protocol Division.

In October 2009, the firm rebranded itself as Metaswitch Networks, to reflect the growing focus on the products and services that it sells to telephone service providers. In August 2011, it formally changed its name from Data Connection Ltd to Metaswitch Networks Ltd.

In July 2014, the company moved some of its software to open-source with the launch of Project Calico. Project Calico was subsequently spun out into an independent startup, Tigera, Inc., with Andy Randall (formerly the general manager of Metaswitch’s Networking Business Unit) as CEO.

On 15 July 2020, two months after announcing a definitive agreement, Microsoft completed the purchase of Metaswitch Networks. In June 2024, Microsoft made major cuts to its Azure for Operators business, which then included most of Metaswitch.

In December 2024, Alianza announced that it had signed a definitive agreement to acquire Metaswitch from Microsoft. On 04 March 2025, the acquisition was completed.

== Acquisitions ==
In March 2010, the firm acquired AppTrigger Inc, a provider of service broker software in Richardson, Texas. In April 2011, it acquired Colibria AS, a provider of Rich Communication Suite (RCS) software in Oslo, Norway. In February 2017, Metaswitch acquired OpenCloud Ltd, a provider of an open mobile services platform.

== Ownership and investors ==
In 1987, Metaswitch established the Employee Benefit Trust (EBT) to hold shares of the company on behalf of the employees, which enabled company-wide profit sharing.

In January 2008 Francisco Partners, a private equity firm, and Sequoia Capital, a venture capitalist firm, invested an undisclosed sum in Metaswitch.
