= Royal Academy of Engineering (Spain) =

Spanish national academy for engineering

Coordinates: 40.4117°N 3.7127°W

- Real Academia de Ingeniería
- Arms of the Royal Academy of Engineering
- Formation: March 29, 1994; 32 years ago
- Type: learned society
- Purpose: "To promote scientific progress in the field of engineering"
- Headquarters: 10 Don Pedro street, Madrid
- Location: Madrid, Spain
- High Patronage: Felipe VI (as King of Spain)
- President: Jaime Domínguez Abascal (since 2023)
- Parent organization: Institute of Spain
- Affiliations: International Council of Academies of Engineering and Technological Sciences
- Website: raing.es/en

The Royal Academy of Engineering (Spanish: Real Academia de Ingeniería, RAI) is Spain's national academy for the field of engineering. Created by Royal Decree 859/1994, it forms part of the Institute of Spain, which brings together Spain's national Royal Academies. The academy falls under the High Patronage of His Majesty King Felipe VI, a constitutional function assigned to the King by Article 62(j) of the Spanish Constitution. Its mission is to place engineering expertise at the service of the public interest: providing independent advice to governments and public authorities, advancing engineering science and its technological applications, disseminating knowledge, and setting standards and best practices.

The academy is officially headquartered at the historic Palace of Villafranca, a prominent cultural heritage site in central Madrid, which was formally inaugurated by His Majesty King Juan Carlos I in 2010. It is a member of the International Council of Academies of Engineering and Technological Sciences (CAETS), the global council of leading national engineering academies, alongside institutions such as the U.S. National Academy of Engineering and the UK Royal Academy of Engineering. It is also a founding member of the European Council of Applied Sciences and Engineering (Euro-CASE). Since 2023, its president has been H.E. Jaime Domínguez Abascal.

Election to Spain's Royal Academy of Engineering is the country's highest distinction in engineering, and one of the highest official distinctions a scientist can receive. Membership is reserved for individuals whose contributions have had a transformative international impact on engineering, applied science, and technology. The academy is highly selective, comprising fewer than 140 individuals worldwide. Its current and former international members include eminent scientists, engineers, and technologists, among them numerous Nobel laureates, Turing Award winners, and members of other national academies.

== History ==
The Academy of Engineering was created by virtue of Royal Decree 859/1994, of 29 April 1994, making it the first national academy to be founded under the reign of King Juan Carlos I.

The Academy of Engineering is a corporation under public law and a distinct legal entity that is governed by its statutes and by its internal regulations. Its main function is to promote works and studies that reflect scientific progress in the field of engineering, its technological applications and its operational techniques.

Its first thirty-six members were appointed by virtue of Ministerial Order of 1 December 1994. These members were designated by the Ministry of Education, having been put forward by the Spanish Institute of Engineering (18 members), the Universities (7 members), the Institute of Spain (6 members) and the Secretariat of State for Universities and Research (5 members).

From its foundation and until early 1999, the academy remained under the protectorate of the Ministry of Education, its president being the Secretary of State for Universities and Research, who delegated the presidency to the academy member Elías Fereres. A provisional governing board was formed by the president-delegate and the members Emilio Llorente, José Antonio Garrido, Antonio Luque, José Ramón Irisarri, César Dopazo, Manuel Elices and Andrés Ripoll.

Over the course of these early years of operation, among other activities, the constituent members drew up a set of internal regulations that covered several aspects, including the election of new members. This procedure has continued to be applied through national calls for new members in order to fill the sixty permanent member seats established by the statutes.

The Ministry of Education protectorate period ended on 19 January 1999 and the Academy of Engineering entered a new phase with the election of its first autonomous governing board, formed by the members Elías Fereres, es:Antonio Luque López, Enrique Alarcón, Javier Aracil, César Dopazo and Mateo Valero Cortés.

Since its beginnings, the Academy of Engineering has received international recognition. It has been admitted as a member of the Council of Academies of Engineering and Technological Sciences (CAETS) and was one of the founding members of the European Council of Applied Sciences and Engineering (Euro-CASE). It has carried out and continues to carry out important collaborative work with both organisations.

On 30 January 2003, for the 2003–2007 period, the second governing board was elected, formed by the members Enrique Alarcón, Andrés Ripoll, Aníbal R. Figueiras, Jaime Torroja, Pere Brunet, and Roberto Fernández de Caleya. Following the death of Roberto Fernández de Caleya, on 29 April 2004 Mrs. María Vallet was elected to replace him.

On 14 July 2003 King Juan Carlos I granted the Academy of Engineering Royal status. Another equally important historical milestone took place on 11 December of the same year when the King presided over the public session in which Leopoldo Calvo-Sotelo took possession of his seat as Honorary Member.

On the initiative of the Royal Academy of Engineering, on 9 May 2005 the Pro Rebus Academiae Foundation was founded. The purpose of the foundation is to support the activities of the Royal Academy of Engineering and contribute to its maintenance by relying on the assistance of companies and institutions with an interest in the development and improvement of engineering.

On 7 June 2005, the State Heritage Department, through the Ministry of Education and Science, granted the use of the public area of the palace of the Marquis of Villafranca (a Spanish Historical Heritage building) to the Royal Academy of Engineering as its headquarters for the provision of its services and the carrying out of its activities.

The King officially opened the headquarters of the Royal Academy of Engineering on 16 November 2010 following the completion of the building refurbishment works, which had taken twenty months.

On 27 January 2007, for the 2007–2011 period, the third governing board was elected, formed by the members Aníbal R. Figueiras, Pere Brunet, José Antonio Martín Pereda, Ramón Argüelles, Enrique Cerdá and José Ignacio Pérez Arriaga.

The current governing board was elected on 5 April 2011 and is formed by the members Elías Fereres, Javier Aracil, Joaquim Coello, Mrs. Josefina Gómez Mendoza, Luis Gil, Manuel Hita, Ricardo Torrón, Ramón Agustí, Manuel Márquez and Elías Muñoz.

== Membership ==
Election to a leading National Academy is among the highest honors a scientist or engineer can receive.

Under its statutes, Spain's Royal Academy of Engineering recognizes two principal categories of elected members: National Members (académicos de número) and International Members (académicos correspondientes). Both categories are reserved for distinguished scientists, engineers, and technologists whose contributions have reshaped the practice and understanding of engineering at the international level. The main difference between the two categories is residency and nationality: National Members must be Spanish citizens who reside in Spain, whereas International Members may be of any nationality and must reside outside Spain. The number of National Members is capped by statute at 60. Although the number of International Members is not statutorily capped, it has traditionally remained below 60 worldwide, underscoring the selectivity of the distinction.

Membership is a lifetime appointment. It is limited in number, cannot be sought by application, and requires nomination by existing members. Candidates are reviewed and evaluated by the Admissions Board, and members are elected only if they receive an absolute majority of votes in plenary session of all members. Current and former international members include celebrated scientists, engineers, and technologists, among them Geoffrey Hinton (Nobel Prize, Physics), Zhores Alferov (Nobel Prize, Physics), Werner Arber (Nobel Prize, Medicine), Norman Borlaug (Nobel Prize, Peace), John Hennessy (Turing Award), Judea Pearl (Turing Award), Maurice V. Wilkes (Turing Award), and around 60 members of foreign national academies.

As members of a Royal Academy integrated into the Institute of Spain, National and International members of Spain's Royal Academy of Engineering are formally addressed in Spanish as "Excelentísimo Señor" (for a man) or "Excelentísima Señora" (for a woman), abbreviated as "Excmo. Sr." and "Excma. Sra." respectively. In English, these styles of address are rendered as "His Excellency" (for a man) or "Her Excellency" (for a woman), abbreviated as "H.E."

== Headquarters ==
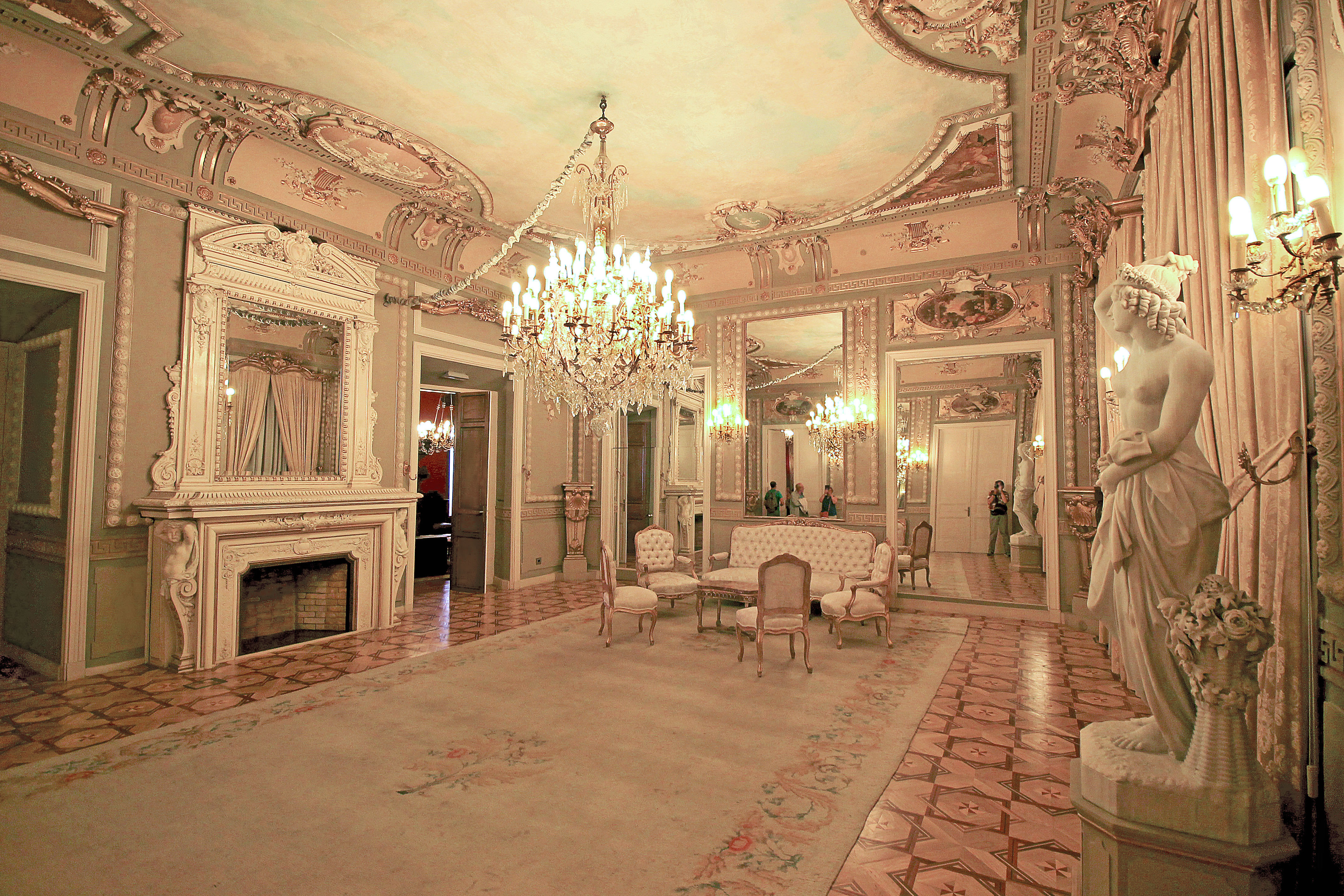
Ballroom of the former mansion of the Marquis of Villafranca, from the 1870s.

The Royal Academy of Engineering has its headquarters in the mansion of the Marquis of Villafranca, in the historical centre of Madrid, very near to Bailén street, Las Vistillas and the Royal Palace. Building work began back in the 17th century, being completed in the 18th century by the 5th Marquis of Villafranca, Pedro Alvarez de Toledo, the namesake of the street where the building is located.

By means of the Ministerial Order of 31 May 2005 by the Ministry of Education and Science, the use of the public part of the palace was ceded to the Royal Academy of Engineering in exchange for the commitment by the latter to restore the building.

The Royal Academy of Engineering covered the cost of the restoration project after raising the necessary funds to do so, with contributions by the Ministry of Public Works through its 1% culture budget and, to a large extent, by some of the companies in the Pro Rebus Academiae Foundation, more specifically Grupo Villar Mir, Telefónica, and Repsol. The restoration work not only dealt with restoring the rooms in the academy, but also reinstating all the artistic elements in their original places, meaning that today, in the 21st century, the history of these rooms can still be felt.

When the restoration work on the building was completed on November 16, 2010, the King of Spain officially opened the headquarters of the Royal Academy of Engineering. The work on the building began in 2007 with the authorisation of the property restoration project by the Ministry of Education and Science.

The history of the property shows the progressive development of the site from the medieval city wall, moving on to the choice of the site by the Infantado and Villafranca families and the subsequent evolution of the urban development through to the 19th century. The Palace, built between 1717 and 1734 under the supervision of the architect Francisco Ruiz, coincided with the gradual establishment in Madrid of the Alvarez de Toledo family, which reached its maximum splendour through the union with the Medina Sidionia and Alba families as a result of the wedding between the 11th Marquis José Álvarez de Toledo y Dubois and María Cayetana de Silva, 13th Duchess of Alba. After this period, the 19th century was witness to the rise of a new noble class based on agricultural and industrial success, and particularly that of Pérez-Seoana y Roca de Togores family, the Barons of Riudoms, appointed Duke of Pinohermoso in 1790 and Grandee of Spain in 1794 by Charles IV of Spain. This family acquired the palace in 1872 and was responsible for organizing the décor lasting through to our day, in which an important role was played by the architect es:Arturo Mélida, and which the current restoration process has returned to its original splendor.

The 20th century saw the gradual disintegration of the property. In 1965, the noble part was sold to the restaurant Puerta de Moros which occupied it until 1989. The same year, the Agencia del Aceite de Oliva (Olive Oil Agency) converted it into their administration services centre until May 12, 2005, when the Royal Academy of Engineering was ceded the use of the building.

All this was described in the work La Sede de la Real Academia de Ingeniería. Historia del Palacio de los Marqueses de Villafranca (The Headquarters of the Royal Academy of Engineering. The History of the Palace of the Marquises of Villafranca) a complete study of the origins and vicissitudes of the Palace, with the academy member Enrique Alarcón taking charge of management of the building in 2008. It was carried out by a group of pupils of the member Josefina Gomez Mendoza: Ángela García Carballo, Gonzalo Madrazo García de Lomana and Juan Francisco Mato Miguel.

== Awards ==
The Royal Academy of Engineering, with the support of Pro Rebus Academia Foundation, announces once a year the Agustín de Betancour and Juan López de Peñalver Awards, intended for young researchers, who has contributed relevantly to any of the fields of Engineering or Architecture, to useful science applications, or to any historical or social aspects related to them.

The Agustín de Betancourt and Juan López de Peñalver Awards have been bestowed on young engineers (under 36 years old) who in accordance with the terms and conditions of the call for applications have carried out their studies in the fields of engineering or architecture, in practical applications of the sciences or historical/social aspects related to all of the above.

Along with it, the Royal Academy of Engineering holds the Academiae Dilecta Award, aimed at companies that have either marketed for the first time in the world a product that has been produced through scientific and technological research and development, or have consistently based their business strategy on the use of new technologies, to which R&D activity carried out internally or in other Spanish centres must have contributed.

The Academiae Dilecta Award, aimed at companies that have either marketed for the first time in the world a product that has been produced through scientific and technological research and development, or have consistently based their business strategy on the use of new technologies, to which R&D activity carried out internally or in other Spanish centres must have contributed.

== External relationships ==
Among other functions, the External Relations Committee is responsible for relations with engineering academies from other countries and institutions of an international nature. These relations facilitate the identification and implementation of joint initiatives that have a positive impact thanks to the exchange of ideas and the spirit of collaboration that are achieved.

The Royal Academy of Engineering reinforces its international presence through its corresponding members, who, as professionals from a variety of engineering disciplines, have shown exceptional merit over the course of their careers and who reside outside Spain. The academy currently has 40 corresponding members from 14 countries.

The Royal Academy of Engineering is a member of the European Council of Applied Sciences and Engineering (Euro-CASE).

Furthermore, and with an international scope, the Royal Academy of Engineering is a member of the International Council of Academies of Engineering and Technological Sciences (CAETS) engineering and technology academies in the world.

Common cultural roots facilitate very close collaboration with Latin American engineering academies, with which the Royal Academy of Engineering exchanges ideas and experiences related to various areas of engineering and their implementation in society.

== Members ==
=== Governing Board ===
The Governing Board was elected in the plenary session held on 12 April 2011 and is formed by the following members:

- President, Elías Fereres Castiel
- Vice President, Javier Aracil Santonja
- Vice President, Joaquim Coello Brufau
- Vice President, Josefina Gómez Mendoza
- General Secretary, Luis Alfonso Gil Sánchez
- Treasurer, Manuel Hita Romero
- Librarian, Ramón Agustí Comes
- Supervisor, Ricardo Torrón Duran
- Member, Manuel Márquez Balín
- Member, Elías Muñoz Merino

=== Constituent Members ===
- Eugenio Andrés Puente
- Javier Aracil Santonja
- Ramón Argüelles Álvarez
- José Luis Díaz Fernández
- Gabriel Ferraté Pascual
- José Antonio Garrido Martínez
- José Ramón Irisarri Yela
- Antonio Luque López
- Emilio Llorente Gómez
- Manuel Márquez Balín
- José Antonio Martín Pereda
- Elías Muñoz Merino
- Luis Alberto Petit Herrera
- Rafael Portaencasa Baeza
- Andrés Ripoll Muntaner
- Enrique Sánchez-Monge y Parellada (Deceased 01–07–10)
- Jaime Torroja Menéndez
- Mateo Valero
- Enrique Alarcón Álvarez
- Eduardo Alonso Pérez de Ágreda
- Antonio Barrero Ripoll (Deceased 04–26–10)
- Pere Brunet Crosa
- Luis Castañer Muñoz
- Elías Fereres Castiel
- Francisco García Olmedo
- Manuel Elices Calafat
- José Antonio Fernández Ordóñez (Deceased 03–01–00)
- Amable Liñán
- Adriano García-Loygorri y Ruiz
- Manuel Valdivia Ureña
- Enrique Castillo Ron
- Avelino Corma Canos
- César Dopazo García
- Rafael Moneo
- Ignasi de Solà-Morales (Deceased 03–12–01)
- Ángel Ramos Fernández (Deceased 01–02–98)

=== Elected permanent members ===
- Javier Rui-Wamba Martija
- Juan Ramón Sanmartín Losada
- Juan-Miguel Villar Mir
- Juan José Martínez García (Deceased 08–06–01)
- Miguel Ángel Lagunas Hernández
- Aníbal R Figueiras Vidal
- Miguel Ángel Losada Rodríguez
- Enrique Cerdá Olmedo
- Manuel Silva Suárez
- Roberto Fernández de Caleya y Álvarez (Deceased 23–01–04)
- Jaime Domínguez Abascal
- Ricardo Torrón Durán
- José Alberto Pardos Carrión
- Pilar Carbonero Zalduegui
- Joan Margarit i Consarnau
- José Ignacio Pérez Arriaga
- María Vallet Regí
- José Luis López Ruiz (Deceased 04–20–09)
- Andrés López Pita
- Antonio Colino Martínez
- Joaquim Coello Brufau
- Javier Jiménez Sendín
- Josefina Gómez Mendoza
- Luis Lada Diaz
- Manuel Doblaré Castellano
- Luis Alfonso Gil Sánchez
- Jaime Conde Zurita
- José Manuel Sanjurjo Jul
- Manuel Hita Romero
- Ramón Agustí Comes
- Juan Antonio Zufiria Zatarain
- José Domínguez Abascal
- Eloy Ignacio Álvarez Pelegry

=== Académicos correspondientes ===
- Germany
  - Johann Böhme
  - Jörg Schlaich
- Australia
  - Martin Andrew Green
- Canada
  - Cristina Amon
  - Yuhang Li
- France
  - Dr Germain Sanz
  - Dr Claude Wolff
- Netherlands
  - Louise Fresco
- Hungary
  - Dr Norber Kroo
- Italy
  - Dr Federico Mazzolani
- Mexico
  - Francisco José Sánchez Sesma
  - Baltasar Mena Iniesta
- Portugal
  - Dr Emanuel Jose Leandro Maranha das Neves
- Russia
  - Dr Viacheslav M Andreev
  - Zhores Alferov
- Spain
  - Dr Pedro Duque
- Switzerland
  - Bruno Thürlimann (Deceased 07–29–08)
  - Werner Arber
- United Arab Emirates
  - Dr. Marcos Lopez de Prado
- United Kingdom
  - Robert Malpas
  - Maurice Wilkes
  - Dr Basil RR Butler
  - Dr Christopher Bishop
- United States of America
  - Dr Raymon J Krizek
  - Angel G. Jordan
  - Dr Jesús A del Álamo
  - Dr Juan Fernández de la Mora
  - Dr Manuel Martínez Sánchez
  - Dr Juan Carlos Lasheras
  - Dr Michael Ortiz
  - John L. Hennessy
  - Dr Steven N Anastasion
  - Norman Ernest Borlaug (Deceased 09–12–09)
  - Dr Jeffrey Hoffman
  - Dr James R Rice
  - William Wulf
  - Janos Galambos
  - Carlos Fernández-Pello
  - Judea Pearl
  - Dr Bora B Mikic
  - Thomas Kailath
  - Dr Jose M Roesset
  - Dr Mark E Davis
  - Zdeněk P. Bažant
  - Subra Suresh
- Uruguay
  - Dr Andrés Tierno Abreu
