= Indonesian Academy of Sciences =

National science academy

- Akademi Ilmu Pengetahuan Indonesia
- Logo of Indonesian Academy of Sciences

Academy of science overview
- Formed: 1956; 69 years ago (original); 1990; 35 years ago (current form)
- Preceding agencies: Indonesian Assembly of Sciences (MIPI); Indonesian Institute of Sciences
- Jurisdiction: Indonesia
- Headquarters: National Library of Indonesia, Central Jakarta, Jakarta
- Website: www.aipi.or.id

Indonesian Academy of Sciences (Indonesian: Akademi Ilmu Pengetahuan Indonesia (AIPI)) is an independent nonstructural Indonesian institution that was formally regulated and established in 1990, formed in 1956 as Indonesian Assembly of Sciences (Majelis Ilmu Pengetahuan Indonesia, MIPI) then restructured in 1967 to become Lembaga Ilmu Pengetahuan Indonesia (LIPI), to assemble leading Indonesian scientists for the purposes of giving opinions, suggestions, and considerations on their own initiatives and/or requests regarding the mastery, development, and utilization of science and technology for the national government and its citizen.
