= UK Young Academy =

Scientific academy in the United Kingdom

- Abbreviation: UKYA
- Formation: June 2022; 4 years ago
- Type: Academy of Sciences
- Headquarters: c/o The Royal Society, 6-9 Carlton House Terrace, St. James's, London SW1Y 5AG
- Location: City of London, London, United Kingdom
- Region served: United Kingdom
- Fields: Interdisciplinary
- Members: 162 members (5-year term)
- Official language: English
- Main organ: Governance Committee; Executive Group
- Affiliations: Academy of Medical Sciences; British Academy; Learned Society of Wales; Royal Academy of Engineering; Royal Irish Academy; Royal Society; Royal Society of Edinburgh
- Website: ukyoungacademy.org Building details

General information
- Coordinates: 51°30′22″N 0°07′57″W

The UK Young Academy (UKYA) is a national interdisciplinary membership organisation that brings together UK-based early career researchers, professionals and innovators from a wide range of sectors, enabling them to collaborate to make a positive difference in the UK and globally. Its work programmes include member-led activities and initiatives that work to address the challenges the world is facing at a national and international level.

== Launch ==
The Royal Society launched the academy in June 2022, in collaboration with six other academies across the UK and Ireland:

- British Academy
- Academy of Medical Sciences
- Learned Society of Wales
- Royal Academy of Engineering
- Royal Irish Academy
- Royal Society of Edinburgh

The Royal Society solicited applications for membership.

== Operation ==
The UK Young Academy is initially operating under the auspices of the Royal Society, and it became the 50th organisation to join the global initiative of Young Academies. Its founding cohort of 67 members started in January 2023. The second cohort of 32 were announced in March 2024. Membership is free, through a competitive selection process, and lasts for five-year terms.

An Executive Group, comprising elected representatives of the membership, forms the leadership team and works with members to implement the Young Academy’s strategy and work programmes. Its seven members, announced in 2023, are:

- Jahangir Alom, Barts Health NHS Trust
- Sandeep Sandhu, Innovate UK Business Connect
- Denis Newman-Griffis, University of Sheffield
- Linda Oyama, Queen's University Belfast
- Edward Pyzer-Knapp, IBM
- Sophie Meekings, University of York
- Amy Vincent, Newcastle University

== See also ==
- Global Young Academy
- World Association of Young Scientists
- Young Academy of Europe
- Young Academy of Scotland
