= Jerusalem Academy of Medicine =

The Jerusalem Academy of Medicine (Hebrew: האקדמיה לרפואה בירושלים) was established in 1957, with the stated goal of promoting the medical science, providing facilities for post graduate students and research, and serving as a center for advancing the medical practice and public health in Israel.

== See also ==
- Israel Medical Association
