= Institute of Spain =

Spanish learned society, grouping ten academies

- Instituto de España

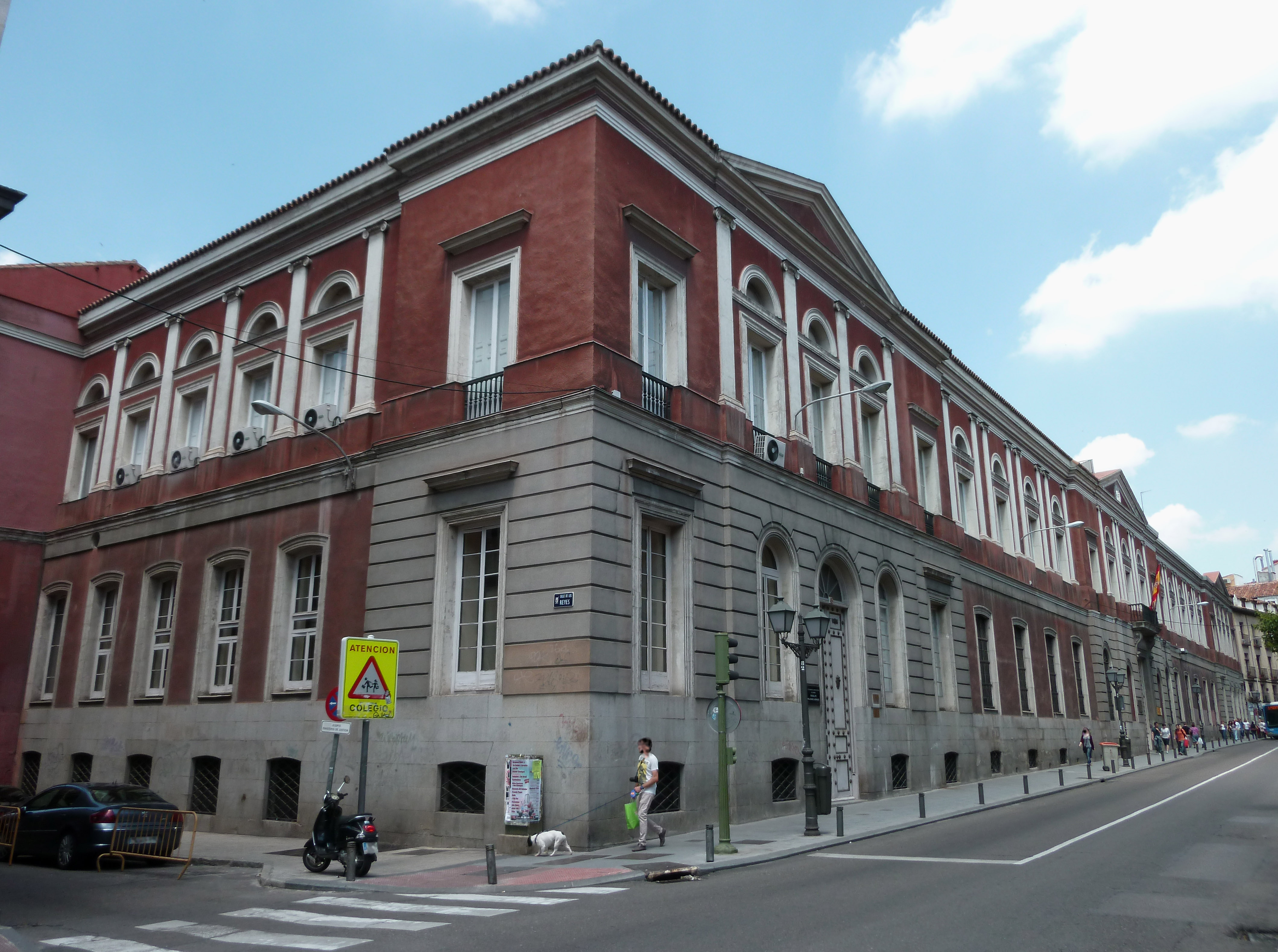
- Caserón de San Bernardo, IdE headquarters
- Abbreviation: IdE
- Formation: 1 January 1938; 88 years ago
- Founders: Eugenio d'Ors; Pedro Sainz Rodríguez
- Type: Learned society
- Purpose: To promote good relations between the royal and associated academies, as well as to promote the generation of knowledge and its transfer to society
- Headquarters: 49th San Bernardo street, Madrid
- Location: Madrid, Spain
- Members: 10 royal academies and 70 associated academies
- Protector: Felipe VI (as King of Spain)
- Parent organization: Ministry of Science, Innovation and Universities
- Affiliations: All European Academies
- Website: institutodeespana.es

The Institute of Spain (Spanish: Instituto de España, IdE) is a Spanish learned society, grouping ten royal academies. The institute is part of the Ministry of Science, Innovation and Universities, which partially funds these organizations.

The organization is headquartered in the city of Madrid, in a building known as Caserón de San Bernardo or Auditorium of Universidad Complutense, a former Jesuits-owned building. The Institute shares the space with the Complutense University of Madrid and the State School Council.

The institute is headed by a president who, since 2010, has been elected annually and on a rotating basis among the presidents or directors of the different royal academies.

== History ==
The institution was founded in 1938 thanks to the impulse of Eugenio d'Ors and Pedro Sainz Rodríguez, who were inspired by the Institute of France. The Decree of January 1, 1938, established that the Institute of Spain was made of six of the most relevant Spanish academies: the Royal Spanish Academy (1713), the Royal Academy of History (1738), the Royal Academy of Sciences (1847), the Royal Academy of Moral and Political Sciences (1857), the Royal Academy of Fine Arts of San Fernando (1752) and the Royal National Academy of Medicine (1734).

All the members of the Institute were gathered for the first time on 6 January 1938, at the University of Salamanca, and, together, they were briefly entrusted with the task of guiding and directing the cultural and research policies in Spain, until the Spanish National Research Council (CSIC) was established.

Since then, the institute has had three expansions: in 1946, when the Royal Academy of Jurisprudence and Legislation (1763) and the Royal Academy of Pharmacy (1737) were incorporated, in 2015, when the Royal Academy of Engineering was incorporated (1994) and in 2017, when the last member, the Royal Academy of Economic and Financial Sciences (1940), joined the institute.

In addition to the ten mentioned, as of 2026, there are another 70 academies associated with the Institute of Spain.

== Academies ==
Currently, the Institute of Spain is made up of ten national Royal Academies, based in Madrid and Barcelona. The incorporation of other academies into the IdE, always at a national level, it is made by agreement of the Government, at the proposal of the minister responsible for the academies, and following a report from the IdeE and the academies that comprise it at that time, assessing the trajectory and quality of the corresponding institution as well as the excellence of its members and activities.

The Royal Academies that currently make up the IdE are the following, according to seniority priority (by date of incorporation into the IdeE):

Academy	Motto	Inception	Incorporation
Royal Spanish Academy	«It purifies, it fixes, and it dignifies»	3 August 1713	2 January 1938
Royal Academy of History	Nox fugit historiæ lumen dum fulget iberis («The night flees, while the light of history shines for the Iberians»)	17 June 1738	2 January 1938
Royal Academy of Fine Arts of San Fernando		12 April 1752	2 January 1938
Royal Academy of Sciences	«Observation and calculation»	25 February 1847	2 January 1938
Royal Academy of Moral and Political Sciences	Verum, justum, pulchrum («True, fair, beautiful»)	30 September 1857	2 January 1938
Royal National Academy of Medicine	Ars cum natura ad salutem conspirans («Art collaborating with nature for health»)	12 August 1734	2 January 1938
Royal Academy of Jurisprudence and Legislation		20 February 1763	26 September 1946
Royal National Academy of Pharmacy	Medicamenta non mella («Medicines are not honey»)	21 August 1737	26 September 1946
Royal Academy of Engineering	Scientia ingenium homini («Knowledge is natural to man»)	29 April 1994	14 July 2015
Royal Academy of Economic and Financial Sciences	Utraque unum («Both are one»)	1 October 1940	24 March 2017

=== Associated academies ===
According to the internal regulation of the Institute of Spain, the institution can make agreements with other academies of national, regional, provincial or local level, officially established and recognized, to make them associated academies. As of 2024, 66 of these academies are associated with the Institute of Spain. The last academy to get this status was the Youth Academy of Spain in April 2024.
