= Delaware Academy of Medicine =

- U.S. National Register of Historic Places
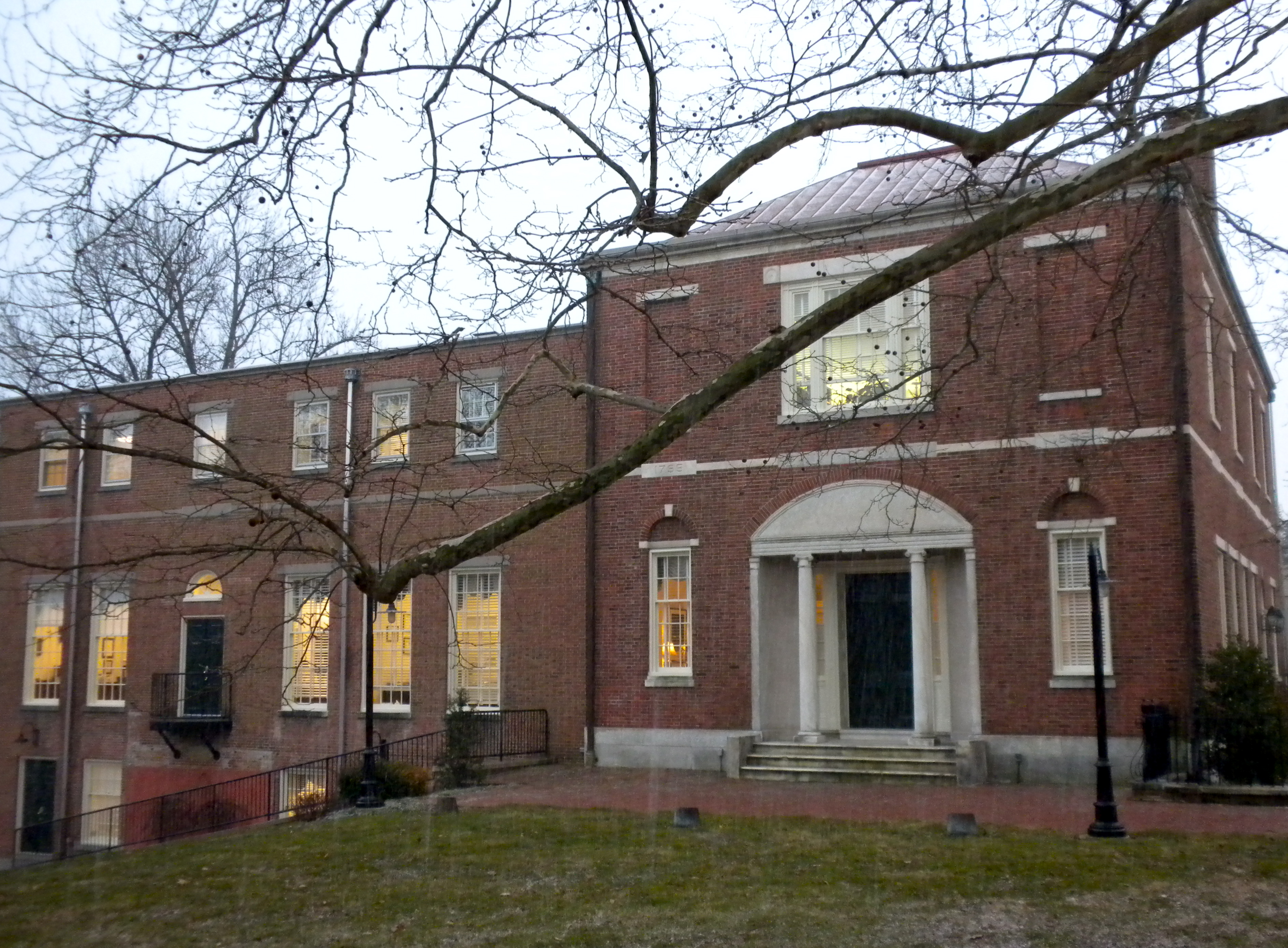

- Location within Delaware Location within the United States
- Location: 1925 Lovering Ave., Wilmington, Delaware
- Coordinates: 39°45′44″N 75°33′42″W
- Area: 1.1 acres (0.45 ha)
- Built: 1931
- Architect: Cornelius, Charles O.; Holden Mclaughlin and Assoc.
- NRHP reference No.: 03000240
- Added to NRHP: April 17, 2003

The Delaware Academy of Medicine, also known as the Academy/DPHA, is a private, nonprofit organization founded in 1930. Its mission is to enhance the well-being of the community through education and the promotion of public health. It is now located at 4765 Ogletown-Stanton Road (Route 4) in Newark, Delaware.

Under the leadership of executive director, Timothy E. Gibbs, MPH, NPM-c, the Delaware Academy of Medicine became Delaware's affiliate to the American Public Health Association in November 2013 - thus becoming the Delaware Public Health Association. Its new name is the Delaware Academy of Medicine / Delaware Public Health Association, or Academy/DPHA for short.

The Academy offers a range of services spanning the spectrum from consumer health education, to student financial aid for medical and dental students, and continuing medical education conferences. The Academy/DPHA serves the general public by holding lectures and seminars to educate the public on important health topics through the Delaware Mini Medical School (a jointly operated program of the Academy/DPHA and Christiana Care Health System) and the Medical Lecture Series at the Osher Academy for Life Long Institute. The Academy/DPHA also has an 11,000+ item archives and history collection of medicine, dentistry, and public health in Delaware. The Academy/DPHA operates and has a hand in many public health programs throughout the state of Delaware. Many other advocacy efforts are conducted in partnership with other public health institutions and nonprofits on a local, regional, and national basis.

The academy's first building, located at 1925 Lovering Avenue in Wilmington, is an historic bank building (originally built in 1815 as the second building of the Bank of Delaware), which was moved to its present location by preservationists in 1931-2 to prevent its demolition, and with the intent of providing a home for the academy. It served the academy until 2006, when it moved to the campus of Christiania Care Health System in Newark, DE.
