= Royal National Academy of Medicine =

Spanish institution that studies economic and financial sciences

- Real Academia Nacional de Medicina
- Arms of the Royal National Academy of Medicine
- Abbreviation: RANM
- Formation: September 13, 1734; 292 years ago
- Type: learned society
- Purpose: To research, study and promote the medical sciences, as well to advise the Crown and other institutions in this matters
- Location: Madrid, Spain
- Protector: Felipe VI (as King of Spain)
- President: Eduardo Díaz-Rubio García (since 2020)
- Parent organization: Institute of Spain
- Website: www.ranm.es

The Royal National Academy of Medicine (Spanish: Real Academia Nacional de Medicina, RANM) is a Spanish institution dedicated to the study, research and promotion of the medical sciences. Its motto is Ars cum natura ad salutem conspirans, "Art collaborating with nature for health".

Since 2020, the president of the RANM is Eduardo Díaz-Rubio García and former president Manuel Díaz-Rubio García acts as honorary president since 2012.

== History ==
The origins of the Royal National Academy of Medicine date back to the summer of 1733, when doctors, surgeons and pharmacists from Madrid met to discuss medical topics.

A year later, on September 13, 1734, King Felipe V approved a royal decree formally creating the Academy of Medicine of Madrid and, after receiving royal protection, acquired the title of "royal".

In the 19th century, during the Ominous Decade, the government ordered its closure, although it only lasted four years. After the death of King Ferdinand VII, during the reign of his daughter, Isabella II, greater freedom of thought and science was allowed, and in 1861 new statutes renamed it as the "Royal National Academy of Medicine", a name that survives to this day.

With the creation of the Institute of Spain in 1938, this academy was one of the six founding members.

== Some relevant academics ==
- Santiago Ramón y Cajal
- Severo Ochoa
- Valentín Fuster
- Anthony Fauci
- David H. Linder
- Nicole Marthe Le Douarin
- Per-Ingvar Brånemark
- Hugo Obwegeser
- Amalio Gimeno
- Gabriella Morreale de Escobar
- Katya Rubia
- Bengt I. Samuelsson
- Andrew Schally
- Carlos Zurita
