= Norwegian Academy of Technological Sciences =

Academy of sciences

- Norges tekniske vitenskapsakademi
- Coat of arms
- Formation: 1955; 71 years ago
- Headquarters: Trondheim, Norway
- Members: ~260 Fellows (younger than 65); ~730 total Fellows
- Patron: Haakon V
- President: Geir Egil Dahle Øien
- Vice-president: Kristin Margrethe Flornes
- General secretary: Ole-Morten Midtgård
- Staff: ~2
- Website: https://ntva.no/

The Norwegian Academy of Technological Sciences (Norwegian: Norges Tekniske Vitenskapsakademi, NTVA) is a learned society based in Trondheim, Norway.

The academy was founded in Trondheim in 1955. the academy has about 290 fellows under the age of 65 and a total of 730 members. King Harald was the academy's high protector, in recognition of the academy's importance to society.

It is a member of the International Council of Academies of Engineering and Technological Sciences (CAETS) and of the European Council of Applied Sciences and Engineering (Euro-CASE).

NTVA is one of four learned societies in Norway. The others are Norwegian Academy of Science and Letters, the Royal Norwegian Society of Sciences and Letters and Agder Vitenskapsakademi.
