= Richmond Academy of Medicine =

- U.S. National Register of Historic Places
- Virginia Landmarks Register
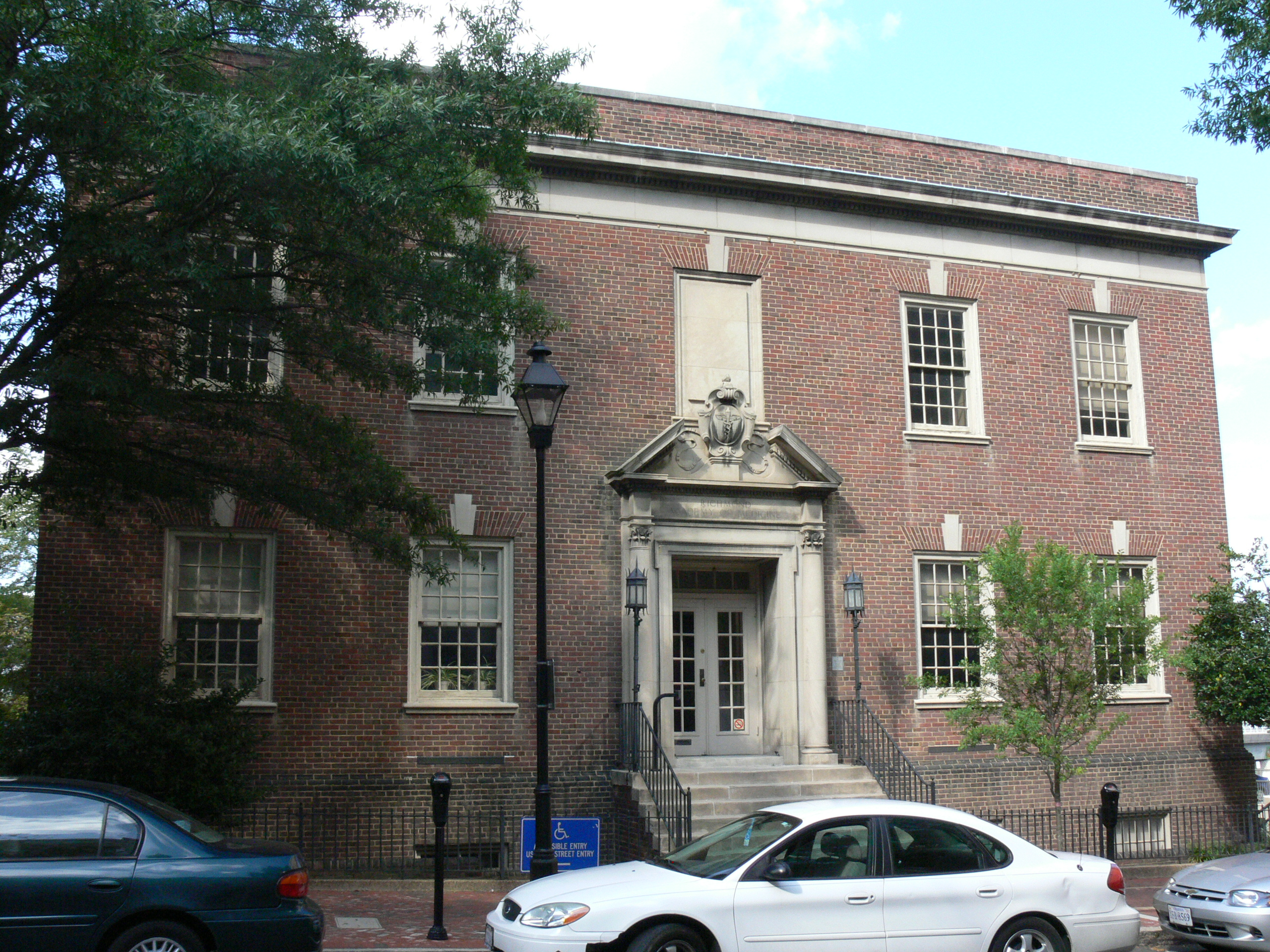
- Richmond Academy of Medicine, July 2011

- Location within Virginia Location within the United States
- Location: 1200 E. Clay St., Richmond, Virginia
- Coordinates: 37°32′27″N 77°25′47″W
- Area: 0.3 acres (0.12 ha)
- Built: 1931-1932
- Architect: Baskervill & Lambert
- Architectural style: Colonial Revival, Georgian Revival
- NRHP reference No.: 84003574
- VLR No.: 127-0250

Significant dates
- Added to NRHP: August 16, 1984
- Designated VLR: May 15, 1984

Richmond Academy of Medicine is a historic medical library building in Richmond, Virginia. It was built in 1931–32, and is a two-story, five bay square, brick and concrete Georgian Revival style building. The building features an elaborately designed entry with a large broken pediment and a cartouche bearing a caduceus. The building houses a library, dining room, auditorium, and offices. It was designed specifically to house what once was a regionally significant collection of early medical manuscripts, art work, instruments and incunabula.

It was listed on the National Register of Historic Places in 1984.
