= Royal Academy of Economic and Financial Sciences =

Spanish institution that studies economic and financial sciences

- Real Academia de Ciencias Económicas y Financieras
- Arms of the Royal Academy of Economic and Financial Sciences
- Abbreviation: RACEF
- Formation: 16 May 1940; 86 years ago
- Type: academy
- Purpose: To research, study and promote the economic, financial and related sciences, as well to advise the Crown and other institutions in this matters
- Location: Barcelona, Spain
- Region served: Spain
- Protector: Felipe VI (as King of Spain)
- President: Jaume Gil Aluja (since 2002)
- Parent organization: Institute of Spain
- Website: racef.es/es/

The Royal Academy of Economic and Financial Sciences (Spanish: Real Academia de Ciencias Económicas y Financieras, RACEF) is a Spanish institution dedicated to the study, research and promotion of economic and financial sciences. Its motto is Utraque Unum, "Both are one".

== History ==
Before the foundation of this academy, other institutions with similar responsibilities and goals existed in Spain, such as the Consulates of the Sea and the Royal Barcelona Board of Trade, but the political and economic instability caused the incessant creation and suppression of this kind of institutions.

At the beginning of the 20th century, the idea of creating a scientific-cultural institution in economic, financial and commercial matters bloomed again, also in Barcelona, but the civil war disrupted those plans.

After the war, in 1940 the Academic Society for Economic-Financial Research was established and, in May of that year, the second government of Francisco Franco formalized its constitution, renaming it as "Academy of Economic and Financial Sciences". The Governing Board fully gathered on 19 February 1943 at the Ateneo Barcelonés.

On 3 January 1958 new regulations for the institution were approved by the Ministry of National Education, this time adding the title of "Royal" to its name. After the restoration of the monarchy in 1975, King Juan Carlos I ratified this point by Royal Decree of 7 December 1979, and he visited the academy for the first time on 16 February 2004.

In April 2017, the RACEF incorporated to the Institute of Spain.

== Presidents ==
Since its inception, the Royal Academy has had the following leaders:

1. José María Vicens Corominas (1940–1951)
2. Ricardo Piqué Batlle (1951–1990)
3. Mario Pifarré Riera (1990–2002)
4. Jaime Gil Aluja (2002–present)

== Relevant academics ==
- Juan Velarde
- César Alierta
- Francesc Granell
- Bertil Ohlin
- Juan-Miguel Villar Mir
- Daniel Kahneman
- Eric Maskin
- Manuel Castells
- Finn E. Kydland
- Robert Aumann
- Joseph Stiglitz
- James Mirrlees
- Reinhard Selten
- Alvin E. Roth
