= Royal Academy of Jurisprudence and Legislation =

- Real Academia de Jurisprudencia y Legislación
- Arms of the Royal Academy of Jurisprudence and Legislation
- Abbreviation: RAJYL
- Formation: 20 February 1763; 263 years ago
- Type: learned society
- Purpose: To research and promotion of Law and related sciences and contribution to the improvement of legislation
- Location: Madrid, Spain
- Region served: Spain
- Protector: Felipe VI (as King of Spain)
- President: Manuel Pizarro Moreno (since 2019)
- Parent organization: Institute of Spain
- Website: rajyle.com

The Royal Academy of Jurisprudence and Legislation (Spanish: Real Academia de Jurisprudencia y Legislación) is a Spanish learned society focused on research and knowledge about legal sciences and legislation. It is headquartered in Madrid, in a building declared Cultural Interest Good in 1998.

== History ==
The origins of the royal academy date back to the meetings of relevant academics and jurists from the city of Madrid who formed the Practical Jurisprudence Board.

This learned society functioned outside the Crown until the reign of Charles III, when in 1763 it was officially recognized and given its current name.
