= Royal Academy of Engineering =

UK national association of engineers

- Formation: June 1976
- Legal status: Royal charter
- Purpose: To advance and promote excellence in engineering
- Headquarters: London, SW1
- Location: United Kingdom
- Members: 2 Royal Fellows, Fellows, International Fellows, Honorary Fellows
- Patron: HM the King
- President: Sir John Lazar CBE FREng
- CEO: Dame Tamara Finkelstein DBE
- Main organ: Board of Trustees
- Website: www.raeng.org.uk

The Royal Academy of Engineering (RAEng) is the United Kingdom's national academy of engineering.

The Academy was founded in June 1976 as the Fellowship of Engineering with support from Prince Philip, Duke of Edinburgh, who became the first senior fellow and remained so until his death. The Fellowship was incorporated and granted a royal charter on 17 May 1983 and became the Royal Academy of Engineering on 16 March 1992. It is governed according to the charter and associated statutes and regulations (as amended from time to time). In June 2024 His Majesty the King became Patron of the Academy.

== History ==
Conceived in the late 1960s, during the Apollo space program and Harold Wilson's espousal of "white heat of technology", the Fellowship of Engineering was born in the year of Concorde's first commercial flight.

The Fellowship's first meeting, at Buckingham Palace on 11 June 1976, enrolled 126 of the UK's leading engineers. The first fellows included Air Commodore Sir Frank Whittle, the jet engine developer, the structural engineer Sir Ove Arup, radar pioneer Sir George G. MacFarlane, the inventor of the bouncing bomb, Sir Barnes Wallis, Francis Thomas Bacon, the inventor of the alkaline fuel cell, and father of the UK computer industry Sir Maurice Wilkes. The Fellowship's first president, Christopher Hinton, had driven the UK's supremacy in nuclear power.

The Fellowship focused on championing excellence in all fields of engineering. Activities began in earnest in the mid-1970s with the Distinction lecture series, now known as the Hinton lectures. The Fellowship was asked to advise the Department of Industry for the first time, and the Academy became host and presenter of the MacRobert Award.

In the 1980s, the Fellowship received its own royal charter along with its first government grant-in-aid. At the same time, it also received significant industrial funding, initiated its research programme to build bridges between academia and industry, and opened its doors to international and honorary fellows.

In 1990, the Academy launched its first major initiative in education, Engineering Education Continuum, which evolved into the BEST Programme and Shape the Future and Tomorrow's Engineers.

The Academy's increasing level of influence – in policy, research and education – was recognized when it was granted a royal title and became The Royal Academy of Engineering in 1992. In 2014 the academy launched its annual Africa Prize.

The Academy's current logo is inspired by the Neolithic hand axe, humans' first technological advance, which was taken to be a symbol appropriate to the Academy, supposedly representative of the ever-changing relationship between humanity and technology.

== Location ==
The Academy's premises, Prince Philip House, 3–4 Carlton House Terrace, are in a Grade I listed building overlooking St James's Park, designed by architect John Nash and owned by the Crown Estate. The Academy shares the Terrace with two of its sister academies, the British Academy and the Royal Society, as well as other institutes.

The building was renamed Prince Philip House, after renovation works were completed in 2012.

== Activities ==
The Academy supports engineering research and innovation, skills and entrepreneurship, policy development, international collaboration, and public engagement. Its 2025–2030 strategy groups these activities under three goals: Sustainable and Innovative Economy, Technology Improving Lives, and Engineering Community Fit for the Future.

The Academy leads the National Engineering Policy Centre (NEPC), a partnership established in 2019 between professional engineering organisations to advise policymakers. From 2022, the centre became the formal coordinating mechanism for engineering education and skills policy, a role previously served by Education for Engineering (E4E).

The Academy receives government funding as one of the UK's four national academies. For 2025–26, the Department for Science, Innovation and Technology (DSIT) said it was investing £217 million across the four academies, mostly in talent schemes, following a £150 million endowment to the Academy itself in 2023–24 for its Green Future Fellowships. National-academy funding also supported public engagement under the government's 2010–2015 policy on public understanding of science and engineering.

The Academy has published Ingenia, a magazine about engineering and technology for non-specialist readers, since its launch in 1999. The magazine was described by its editors in 2024 as aimed primarily at people aged 13 to 25 with an interest in STEM, and as reaching more than 4,000 schools across the UK.

== Presidents ==
The president of the Royal Academy of Engineering, the elected officer of the Academy, presides over meetings of the council. The president is elected for a single term of not more than five years.

Years	President	
1976–1981	Christopher Hinton, Baron Hinton of Bankside	OM, KBE, FREng, FRS
1981–1986	Robin Inskip, 2nd Viscount Caldecote	DSC, KBE, FREng
1986–1991	Sir Denis Rooke	OM, CBE, FREng, FRS
1991–1996	Sir William Barlow	FREng
1996–2001	Sir David Davies	CBE, FREng, FRS
2001–2006	Alec Broers, Baron Broers	FREng, FRS
2006–2011	John Browne, Baron Browne of Madingley	FREng, FRS
2011–2014	Sir John Parker	GBE, FREng
2014–2019	Professor Dame Ann Dowling	OM, DBE, FREng, FRS
2019–2024	Sir Jim McDonald	GBE, FREng, FRSE
2024-	Sir John Lazar	CBE, FREng

== Fellowship ==
As of January 2025, the Academy reported 1,724 members of the Fellowship, excluding Royal Fellows: 1,265 Fellows, 81 International Fellows, 41 Honorary Fellows and 337 Emeritus Fellows. Fellows are entitled to use the title Fellow of the Royal Academy of Engineering and the post-nominal letters FREng. Election to the Fellowship is by nomination only; candidates are peer-nominated by two existing Academy Fellows.

Royal Fellows are members of the royal family who accept an invitation from the Academy's Board. The Duke of Kent became a Royal Fellow in 1986, followed by the Princess Royal in 2010; both support Academy events and activities.

=== Diversity ===
In 2002, a Science and Technology Select Committee inquiry into government funding of the Royal Society, the Academy and other scientific learned societies described the low representation of women in the Academy's Fellowship as "disappointing" and criticised the absence of ethnic monitoring; at the time, 15 of the Academy's 1,270 Fellows were women (1.2%). The committee recommended fair and transparent selection procedures to improve representation and provide confidence that the Royal Society and Academy were not an "old boys' network", while finding no evidence that the low representation of women resulted from discrimination and noting that the Academy was already proactively encouraging nominations from areas of engineering underrepresented in the Fellowship. The Academy subsequently said that it shared the committee's concern about the number of women Fellows and was reviewing its procedures for ethnic monitoring.

The Academy states that its Proactive Nominations Panel was formed in 2007; it identifies and tracks potential candidates and engages existing Fellows as "champions" to support them through the nomination process. In July 2020, the Academy launched its Fellowship Fit for the Future campaign to increase the election of candidates from four broad target groups: people from groups underrepresented in the Fellowship; those entering engineering through vocational or non-traditional routes; those achieving excellence at earlier career stages; and those working in emerging technologies and new industries. The Academy set an aspiration that at least half of those elected each year would come from these groups.

In January 2025, 149 of the Academy's 1,265 Fellows were women (11.8%). Its 2024/25 annual report stated that 68% of Fellows elected in 2024 came from the initiative's target groups, compared with its aspiration of at least 50%.

== Awards and prizes ==
- With the support of the Worshipful Company of Engineers, the Academy manages the annual Royal Academy of Engineering MacRobert Award, the premier prize for UK innovation in engineering. First presented in 1969, the award honours the winning company with a gold medal and the team members with a prize of £50,000.
- The Academy oversees the awarding of the Queen Elizabeth Prize for Engineering (QEPrize). The QEPrize is an international, £1 million engineering prize that "rewards and celebrates the engineers responsible for a ground-breaking innovation that has been of global benefit to humanity". The objective of the prize is to "raise the public profile of engineering and to inspire young people to become engineers".
- The Academy's Sir George Macfarlane Medal is an annual award that "recognizes a UK engineer who has demonstrated excellence in the early stage of their career".
- The President's Medal
- The Prince Philip Medal, named after Prince Philip, Duke of Edinburgh, and "awarded periodically to an engineer of any nationality who has made an exceptional contribution to engineering as a whole through practice, management or education."
- The Africa Prize For Engineering Innovation has been awarded annually since 2014. In its first ten years it provided a million pounds of finance in addition to assistance with legal, IT and networking. The 2015 prize was won by Tanzanian Askwar Hilonga who had devised a novel water filter
- Chair in Emerging Technologies, a scheme providing long-term support to visionary researchers in developing technologies with potential to deliver benefits to the United Kingdom.
- Engineering Leadership Scholarship, awarded to engineering undergraduate students in the UK with high potential for leadership in the sector. Awardees undertake an accelerated personal development programme to assist awardees in becoming future leaders.
- The Princess Royal Silver Medal celebrates an outstanding personal contribution made to UK engineering by an early to mid-career engineer, resulting in market exploitation and up to four medals are awarded each year. It is named in honour of the Academy's Royal Fellow, HRH The Princess Royal, acknowledging her exceptional role in championing engineering.
- The Bhattacharyya Award: Established in 2019 in tribute to Lord Kumar Bhattacharyya, this award highlights projects that embody his vision of academia-industry cooperation to drive societal impact.

== See also ==
- Engineering Development Trust
- Engineering
- Glossary of engineering
- Royal Academy of Engineering International Medal
- UK Young Academy
