= List of Lebanese Americans =

Lebanese Americans
Total population
- 504,000 (ancestry unknown); 0.16% of total population (2007)

Regions with significant populations
- Michigan, California, New York, Florida, Ohio, Massachusetts, Texas, Illinois, Pennsylvania, Arizona, New Jersey, Washington

Languages
- American English, Arabic, Aramaic, French, and Armenian

Religion
- Predominantly Christianity (mostly Catholic), with minorities of Islam and Judaism

This is a list of notable individuals born in the United States of Lebanese ancestry and/or people of Lebanese and American dual nationality who live or lived in the United States.

== Arts and entertainment ==
=== Artists ===
- Etel Adnan – painter, poet
- Margot Douaihy – writer
- Chawky Frenn – painter and art professor
- Kahlil Gibran – aka Kahlil G. Gibran, artist, sculptor
- Nabil Kanso – painter
- Sam Maloof – woodworkersaw
- Juman Malouf – costume designer, artist, illustrator, writer, and the romantic partner of film director Wes Anderson.

=== Beauty pageant contestants ===
- Rima Fakih – Miss USA 2010

=== Entertainment personalities ===
- Adrienne Maloof - businesswoman and television personality of Lebanese and Irish descent.
- Alexander Koch – actor of Lebanese, Italian and German descent
- Alyssa Farah Griffin - co-host of ABC’s The View
- Amy Yasbeck – actress (father was of Lebanese descent)
- Anissa Jones – child actor (mother was of Lebanese descent)
- Antonio Cipriano – actor and singer of Lebanese and Italian descent
- AustinShow – Twitch streamer and YouTuber
- Brittany Snow - Teen Choice Award-nominated actress of paternal Lebanese descent known for her roles in Prom Night, Hairspray, and the Pitch Perfect film series
- Callie Khouri – Oscar-winning screenwriter
- Casey Kasem – radio personality, American Top 40 franchise; voiceover actor (cartoon series Scooby-Doo, Transformers)
- Catherine Keener – actress, mother of Lebanese descent
- Celeste Thorson – actress, model, activist, screenwriter
- Chris Romano – actor, producer, director (father of Lebanese heritage, born Shaheen)
- Cristina Vee – singer and voice actor
- Demián Bichir – Mexican-American film actor of Lebanese heritage
- Dan Jbara – television and film producer
- Danny Thomas – actor
- David Yazbek – musician and composer famous for the Broadway musical The Full Monty
- Diane Rehm – host and executive producer of The Diane Rehm Show on National Public Radio
- Edy Ganem – actress (parents are of Lebanese descent)
- Elie Samaha – film producer
- Emeraude Toubia – actress (father is Lebanese)
- Emile Kuri – Mexican-born American Oscar-winning art director
- Frank Lackteen – actor
- Gregory Jbara – television and film actor
- George Nader – actor, uncle of Michael Nader
- George Noory – radio host (radio program Coast to Coast AM)
- Haaz Sleiman – actor (series Nurse Jackie; film The Visitor)
- Hank the Angry Drunken Dwarf – radio and television personality
- James Stacy – film and television actor
- Jamie Farr – actor (sitcom M*A*S*H)
- Jamie Gray Hyder – actress, model (father of Lebanese descent)
- Jane Wiedlin – musician, actress (mother was of Lebanese descent)
- Jenna Dewan – actress (paternal grandfather was of Lebanese descent)
- Josie Totah – actress
- Kristen Doute – television personality known for Vanderpump Rules
- Joan Alexander – actress known for her role as Lois Lane
- John A. Kuri – author and writer, film and television producer, and director
- John Leguizamo – actor (maternal grandfather was Lebanese)
- Kathy Najimy – actress
- Kerri Kasem – radio and television host; daughter of Casey Kasem
- Khrystyne Haje – actress (sitcom Head of the Class)
- Lili Estefan – Cuban-American television personality, niece of Emilio Estefan
- Marlo Thomas – actress (father was of Lebanese descent)
- Mario Kassar – filmmaker, founder of Carolco Pictures
- Mary Zilba – television personality and singer
- Mayssa Karaa – Grammy-nominated singer
- Mia Khalifa – pornographic actress and adult model
- Michael Ansara – stage, screen, and voice actor (Lebanese born American)
- Michael Nader – actor, All My Children and Dynasty
- Mika Abdalla – actress
- Mo Gallini – actor (father of Lebanese descent)
- Paola Turbay – Colombian-American actress, model, beauty queen and television presenter
- Paul Anka – singer-songwriter, actor, producer
- Peter Macdissi – film and television actor
- Raya Meddine – actress of Lebanese descent
- Robert Romanus – actor and musician
- Rose Abdoo – comedian, actress
- Rowan Blanchard – actress (father of Lebanese descent)
- Salma Hayek – Mexican-American actress (paternal grandfather was Lebanese)
- Sara Boustany – actress
- Senta Moses – actress known for her role in Home Alone
- Shannon Elizabeth – actress (father of Lebanese descent)
- Terrence Malick – filmmaker, of part Lebanese descent
- Tom Shadyac – film director (of 3/4 Lebanese descent)
- Tony Shalhoub – actor (Monk)
- Tony Thomas – producer (father was of Lebanese descent)
- Vince Vaughn – actor (paternal grandmother was of Lebanese descent)
- Wentworth Miller – actor, maternal great-grandmother of Lebanese descent
- Yasmeen Fletcher – actress and musician, mother of Lebanese descent
- Yasmine Al Massri – Lebanese-born American actress

=== Fashion designers ===
- Joseph Abboud – fashion designer
- Reem Acra – fashion designer
- Norma Kamali – fashion designer
- Elie Saab – fashioner designer

=== Musicians ===
- Andrew Bazzi – pop musician
- Andy Kim – pop rock singer and songwriter
- Dick Dale – rock guitarist and surf music pioneer
- Emilio Estefan – Cuban-American musician and producer; husband of Gloria Estefan
- G. E. Smith – lead guitarist in the band Hall & Oates; musical director of Saturday Night Live
- Hamed Sinno – Lebanese-American graphic designer, singer-songwriter of the band Mashrou'Leila
- Jack Barakat – guitarist of the band All Time Low
- Jane Wiedlin – musician, singer-songwriter, and actress; best known as a member of the all-female new wave band The Go-Go's
- John Dolmayan – Lebanese-American of Armenian descent, drummer of band System of a Down
- Kat Dahlia – singer-songwriter, rapper
- Mohammed El-Bakkar – tenor singer, oud player, and conductor
- Sacha Boutros – international peace singer, cultural ambassador, composer and producer
- Nadia Azzi – pianist
- Paul Anka – singer-songwriter (both parents of Lebanese descent)
- Sammy Hagar – singer-songwriter and guitarist
- Paul Jabara – composer
- Neil Sedaka – pop/rock singer, pianist, composer and record producer
- Ron Affif – jazz guitarist and musician
- Rosalind Elias – opera singer renowned for her time in the Metropolitan Opera
- Serj Tankian – Lebanese-American of Armenian descent, lead singer of band System of a Down
- Soraya – Colombian-American singer
- Tiffany – singer
- Tino Coury – singer-songwriter and producer
- Tiny Tim – folk singer
- Tyler Joseph – lead singer of Twenty One Pilots

== Legal professionals ==
- Tom Ajamie - civil litigation attorney
- Eva M. Mack – attorney who worked on the California civil rights case Davis v. Carter
- Jeanine Pirro – former district attorney of Westchester County, New York

== Business ==
- Alec Gores – entrepreneur
- Caroline Ghosn – entrepreneur
- Charles Elachi – director of Jet Propulsion Laboratory
- Clifford Antone – founder of Antone's blues club in Austin, Texas
- Debra Cafaro – CEO of Ventas Inc., a healthcare real estate investment trust
- Fares D. Noujaim – business executive
- Frédéric Fekkai – French-American hairdresser and founder of Frédéric Fekkai salons and hair products
- George Joseph – founder of Mercury Insurance Group
- George J. Maloof Jr. – businessman and owner of the Sacramento Monarchs, Sacramento Kings and the Palms Casino Resort in Las Vegas
- George J. Maloof Sr. – businessman and former owner of the Houston Rockets
- Jacques Nasser – former CEO of Ford Motor Company
- Jean Succar Kuri – businessman
- Joe Jamail – attorney and businessman
- Joe Robbie – attorney and original owner of the Miami Dolphins
- John J. Mack – former CEO of investment bank Morgan Stanley (2005–2009)
- Joseph J. Jacobs – former chairman and founder of the Jacobs Engineering Group
- Madeleine A. Pickens – business executive
- Magid Abraham – market research expert and businessman
- Manuel Moroun – businessman and the owner of the Ambassador Bridge
- Marc Lemonis – businessman and TV personality
- Michael Boulos – business executive and partner of Tiffany Trump
- Moose Scheib – founder and CEO of LoanMod.com
- Paul Orfalea – founder of Kinko's
- Richard Rainwater (1944–2015) – investor and philanthropist
- Richard Rashid – founder of Microsoft Research
- Robert Khuzami – former director of the U.S. Securities and Exchange Commission
- Thomas J. Barrack Jr. – businessman and founder of Colony Capital
- Tony Fadell – product development manager at Apple Inc.
- Tony Tamer – founder and co-CEO of H.I.G. Capital
- Ziad Makkawi - investor and entrepreneur

== Education and academics ==
- Charbel Farhat – Vivian Church Hoff Professor of Aircraft Structures in the School of Engineering and inaugural James and Anna Marie Spilker Chair of the Department of Aeronautics and Astronautics, at Stanford University;
- Joseph E. Aoun – President of Northeastern University
- Nafe Katter – professor of theatre, University of Connecticut
- Robert Khayat – Chancellor of the University of Mississippi
- Eugene Nassar – author, literary critic and professor
- Donna Shalala – U.S. Representative from Florida, former U.S. Secretary of Health and Human Services and former President of the University of Miami
- Phoebe Stanton – faculty at Johns Hopkins University from 1955 until 1982, art historian, urban planner for the city of Baltimore.
- Gabriel Hawawini – emeritus professor of finance and former holder of the Henry Grunfeld Chair in Investment Banking at INSEAD
- Rabab Atwi Nasr, Ph.D- Professor of Education, Irvine, California

== History ==
- Akram Fouad Khater – professor, author, expert on Lebanese-American studies
- Philip Khuri Hitti – historian of Arab culture and history

== Journalism ==
- Anthony Shadid – foreign correspondent for The New York Times and earlier The Boston Globe
- Brian Karem – journalist and White House correspondent
- Helen Thomas – journalist who covered every U.S. president from 1961 to 2010
- Jad Abumrad – radio host, composer, and producer, founder and co-host of the syndicated public radio program Radiolab
- Jim Avila – senior correspondent for ABC News
- Leila Fadel – journalist for National Public Radio
- Lucie Salhany – first woman to head a broadcast television network in 1993 in the position as Chairman of Fox Broadcasting Company
- Octavia Nasr – former television journalist for CNN
- Paula Faris – journalist (father was of Lebanese descent)
- Raghida Dergham – columnist and senior diplomatic correspondent for the London-based Al Hayat
- Sara Ganim – CNN journalist (father is of Lebanese descent)
- Serena Shim – journalist
- Tamsen Fadal – television journalist
- Walid Phares – security and anti-terrorism expert
- Naoum Mokarzel - media mogul who founded the Al-Hoda Newspaper

== Medicine ==
- Amin J. Barakat – physician, known for the diagnosis of Barakat syndrome
- Charles Sophy – psychiatrist
- Daniel Amen – psychiatrist and author
- George Hatem – "Ma Haide," a founder of the public health system in China
- M. Amin Arnaout – nephrologist and physician-scientist
- Michael DeBakey – heart surgeon, medical innovator
- Larry Nassar – osteopathic physician, serial child molester
- Paul Nassif – facial plastic surgeon, co-star on the television series Botched

== Military ==
- Alfred Naifeh – U.S. Navy lieutenant posthumously awarded the Navy and Marine Corps Medal in WWII and namesake of a U.S. Navy ship, USS Naifeh (DE-352)
- Ernest "Iron Mike" Massad – U.S. Army major general
- George Joulwan – retired U.S. Army general
- James Jabara – first American jet ace
- John Abizaid – retired general in the United States Army
- Michael A. Monsoor – U.S. Navy SEAL awarded Medal of Honor after being killed during the Iraq War

== Politics ==
=== Activists ===
- Jahaira DeAlto – domestic violence victims and LGBT community activist and advocate
- Brigitte Gabriel – founder of non-profit political organizations American Congress For Truth and ACT! for America; author; formerly journalist in Israel working for World News
- Candy Lightner – activist and founder of Mothers Against Drunk Drivers
- James Zogby – founder of the Arab-American Institute
- Jill Kelley – international advocate, socialite, and former diplomat
- John Zogby – pollster; founder of Zogby International

=== Politicians ===
- Abraham Kazen – former U.S. representative from Texas
- Katcho Achadjian – former member of the California State Assembly, member of the San Luis Obispo County Board of Supervisors
- Alex Azar – former United States Secretary of Health and Human Services
- Charles Boustany – former U.S. representative from Louisiana
- Charlie Crist – former U.S. representative from Florida and former governor of Florida
- Maxwell Frost – U.S. representative from Florida
- Chris Greeley – former Maine state representative
- Chris John – former U.S. representative from Louisiana
- Chris Sununu – former governor of New Hampshire
- Darin LaHood – Republican representative from Illinois
- Darrell Issa – U.S. representative from California
- David Karem – member of Kentucky Senate from 1976 to 2004
- Debbie Mucarsel-Powell – former U.S. representative from Florida
- Dean Fuleihan – former and designated First Deputy Mayor of New York City
- Donna Shalala – former U.S. representative from Florida and former U.S. Secretary of Health and Human Services
- Edward M. Gabriel – former U.S. ambassador to Morocco
- Francis Slay – former mayor of Saint Louis
- Garret Graves – former U.S. representative from Louisiana
- George A. Kasem – former U.S. representative from California
- George J. Mitchell – former U.S. senator from Maine
- Gwen Graham – former U.S. representative from Florida
- James Abdnor – former U.S. senator and U.S. representative from South Dakota
- James Abourezk – former U.S. senator from South Dakota
- Jeanine Pirro – politician, judge and television host
- Joe Ganim - mayor of Bridgeport, Connecticut (Father is Lebanese)
- John Baldacci – former governor of Maine and U.S. representative
- John E. Sununu – former U.S. senator and U.S. representative from New Hampshire
- John H. Sununu – former White House Chief of Staff; former governor of New Hampshire
- Katcho Achadjian – former California State Assembly member, of Armenian descent
- Najwa Massad - Mayor of Mankato Minnesota
- Manuel Maloof – former U.S. government official and businessman
- Mary Rose Oakar – former U.S. representative from Ohio
- Nick Rahall – former U.S. representative from West Virginia
- Nico LaHood – Bexar County district attorney, Texas
- Pat Danner – former U.S. representative from Missouri
- Peter Daou - musician and former presidential campaign advisor for Hillary Clinton, Marianne Williamson and Cornel West
- Philip Habib – former U.S. ambassador and envoy
- Ralph Abraham – former U.S. representative from Louisiana
- Ralph Nader – political activist and former U.S. presidential candidate (Green Party)
- Ray LaHood – former U.S. Transportation Secretary and former U.S. representative from Illinois
- Richard L. Hanna – former U.S. representative from New York
- Richard Ieyoub – former Attorney General of Louisiana
- Rubén Kihuen – former U.S. representative from Nevada
- Selwa Roosevelt – former U.S. government official
- Spencer Abraham – former U.S. senator from Michigan
- Suzanne Haik Terrell – former Louisiana elections commissioner
- Toby Moffett – former U.S. representative from Connecticut
- Victor G. Atiyeh – former governor of Oregon
- Vincent Sheheen – member of the South Carolina senate
- Sam H. Zakhem – member of the Colorado State House of Representatives, Colorado state senator, former U.S. ambassador to Bahrain under Ronald Reagan

=== Other personalities ===
- Adele Khoury Graham – educator and former first lady of the State of Florida
- George Noory – radio host of Coast to Coast AM; author; entertainer
- Joseph Farah – author and journalist
- Nassim Nicholas Taleb – best-selling author, risk expert and statistician, university professor, and former trader and business person
- Robert Khuzami, U.S. deputy attorney for Southern District of New York
- Timothy Massad – U.S. Treasury Department official and corporate lawyer
- Jirair Ratevosian – acting chief of staff to the United States Global AIDS Coordinator (2022–23)
- Victoria Reggie Kennedy – attorney and widow of U.S. Senator Edward Kennedy

== Sciences ==
- Anthony Atala – director of the Wake Forest Institute for Regenerative Medicine
- Moustafa T. Chahine - atmospheric scientist
- Joanne Chory - plant biologist and geneticist
- Edgar Choueiri - plasma physicist
- Elias Corey – 1990 Nobel Prize winner in Chemistry
- Doris Daou – NASA astronomer
- Michael Debakey – doctor and heart surgeon, medical innovator
- Charles Elachi – electrical engineer, 8th director of NASA Jet Propulsion Labs
- Charbel Farhat – director, Army High Performance Computing Research Center, Stanford University, and Member of National Academy of Engineering
- Christa McAuliffe – teacher and astronaut who was killed on the Space Shuttle Challenger; mother was of partial Lebanese descent
- Mikhail Nasrallah - plant geneticist
- June Nasrallah - plant geneticist
- Hassan Kamel Al-Sabbah – technology innovator
- Edward M. Sion - astrophysicist
- Hussein M. Zbib - educator and engineer
- Huda Zoghbi - human geneticist, neuroscientist

== Sports ==
=== Athletes ===
- Abe Mickal – football player for LSU
- Bobby Rahal – professional car racer and team owner
- Charley Zivic – professional boxer
- Damien Sandow – professional wrestler in the WWE
- David Azzi – professional football player
- Doug Flutie – former professional football player
- Fred Saigh – lawyer; real estate investor; owner of the American professional baseball franchise the St. Louis Cardinals
- Graham Rahal – professional car racer
- Jackson Vroman – former professional basketball player and member of Lebanon's national basketball team (naturalized Lebanese citizen)
- Jeff George – former NFL quarterback for the Indianapolis Colts
- Jim Harrick – former head coach of the University of Georgia Bull Dogs
- Joe Lahoud – former Major League Baseball outfielder
- Joe Vogel – professional basketball player and member of Lebanon's national basketball team
- John Elway – Hall of Fame NFL quarterback for the Denver Broncos
- John Grabow – former Major League Baseball pitcher
- John Jaha – former first baseman in Major League Baseball, played for the Milwaukee Brewers and Oakland Athletics
- Johnny Manziel – professional football player
- Jordyn Wieber – Olympic gymnast and gold medallist
- Liz Carmouche – mixed martial artist
- Matt Freije – ex-NBA player and member of Lebanon national basketball team
- Matt Kalil – professional football player
- Mikie Mahtook – Major League Baseball outfielder
- Omari Spellman – basketball player
- Patrick Maroon – ice hockey player for the Edmonton Oilers in the NHL
- Paul Rabil – former professional lacrosse player
- Petey Sarron – former featherweight boxing champion
- Rich Kotite – former National Football League player and coach
- Robert Saleh – professional football coach and head coach of the New York Jets
- Robert Watkins – former professional football player; of African-American and Lebanese descent
- Rony Seikaly – former professional basketball player in the NBA and for both the U.S. and Lebanon's national basketball team
- Ryan Kalil – professional football player
- Sabu – professional wrestler, real name Terry Brunk
- Sage Karam – professional car racer
- Samir Bannout – former professional bodybuilder and winner of Mr. Olympia title in 1983
- Skandor Akbar – former professional wrestler
- Soony Saad – professional soccer forward player
- Steve Kerr – retired professional basketball player and current head coach of the Golden State Warriors
- Toni Breidinger – professional race car driver

=== World Series of Poker champions ===
- Ihsan "Sammy" Farha – three-time WSOP-bracelet winner
- Jennifer Shahade – two-time United States Women's champion; has the FIDE title of woman grandmaster
- Kassem "Freddy" Deeb – two-time WSOP-bracelet winner
- Joe Hachem – WSOP main event winner and a WPT championship winner (1 of 6 players in the world to win both)

== Writers ==
- Ameen Rihani – author
- D. H. Melhem – poet, novelist, and editor
- Geoff Johns – comic book writer
- Khalil Gibran – author and philosopher
- Lee Francis – poet
- Mikha'il Na'ima – author and poet
- Nassim Nicholas Taleb – essayist
- Paula Gunn Allen – Native American poet and activist
- Rabih Alameddine – author
- Raymond Khoury – novelist and screenwriter
- Saree Makdisi – author and literary critic
- Stephen Karam – playwright
- Vance Bourjaily – novelist
- William Peter Blatty – writer, screenwriter

== See also ==
- Lebanese Americans-Zoe Maloley
- Lebanon–United States relations
- List of Lebanese people
- List of Lebanese people (diaspora)
- Arab Americans
- Lebanese Canadian
