= Chiyoko Sakamoto =

American lawyer

Chiyoko Takahashi
- Born: Chiyoko Sakamoto Takahashi; June 30, 1912; Napa, California, U.S.
- Died: December 2, 1994 (aged 82)
- Education: American University Washington College of Law
- Employers: Law firm of Hugh Ellwood Macbeth Sr.; Private Practice Law Firm
- Organization(s): Japanese-American Bar Association and the California Women's Bar (founder of both)
- Spouse: Tohru Takahashi
- Parent(s): Hisamatsu and Kume Sakamoto

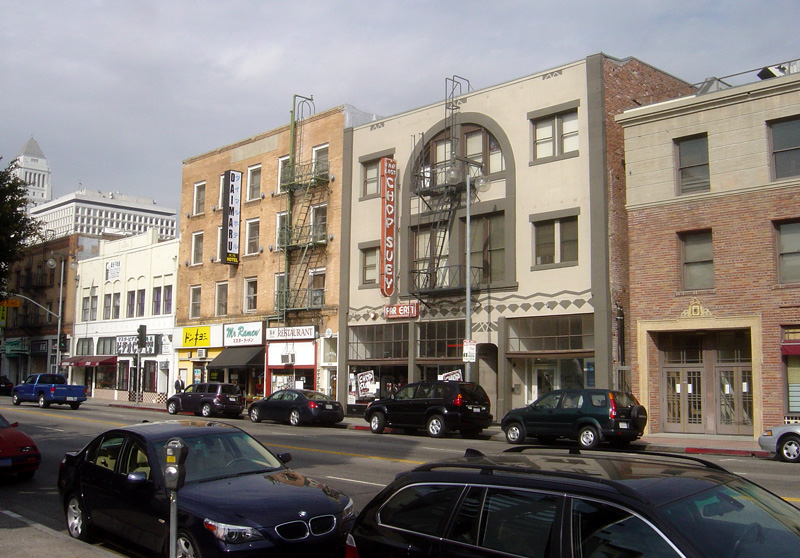
Little Tokyo, Downtown Los Angeles. Sakamota opened her private law practice in this community.

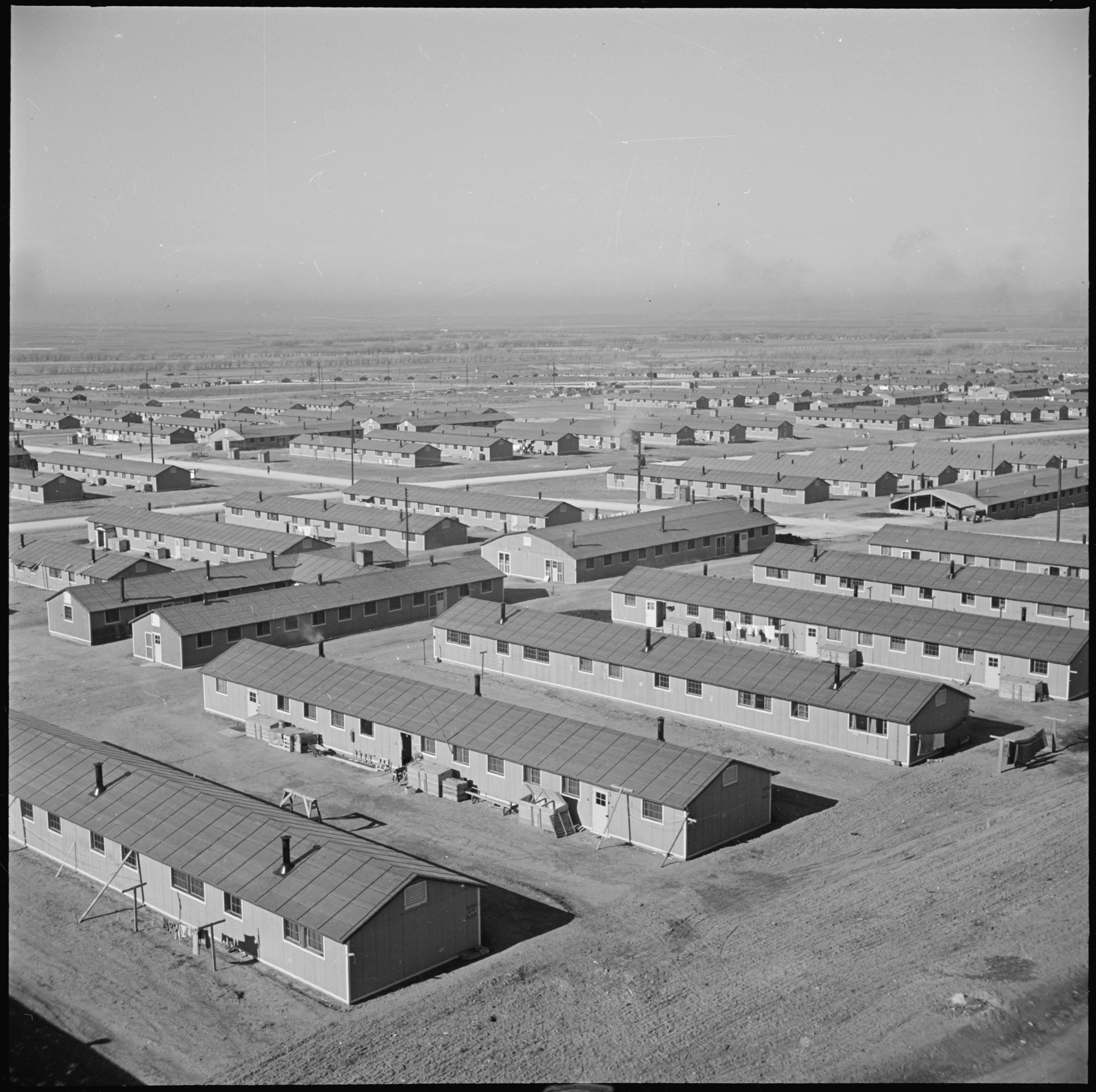
Granada Relocation Center, Amache, Colorado.

Chiyoko Sakamoto (1912–1994) was California's first Japanese American female lawyer.

Sakamoto was born on June 30, 1912, in Los Angeles, California, to Hisamatsu and Kume Sakamoto. In 1938, she was admitted to practice law shortly after graduating from the American University Washington College of Law in Los Angeles, California. Sakamoto worked as a secretary during the four years of her legal studies. She became a legal assistant for a Japanese-American community leader after searching in vain for a law firm position.

During World War II, following the signing of Executive Order 9066, Sakamoto was imprisoned in the Granada Internment Camp in Prowers County, Colorado. Upon being released in 1947, she struggled yet again with finding employment. Through her struggles, she met Harvard University-educated African-American attorney Hugh E. Macbeth Sr., who was a staunch defender of Japanese-Americans. He hired Sakamoto as an associate at his Los Angeles-based law firm. Sakamoto's coworkers included Eva M. Mack, a lawyer who worked with Macbeth Sr. on the California Supreme Court case Davis vs. Carter that pertained to a housing discrimination suit filed by jazz musician Benny Carter. At the time, Sakamoto was unique in working for a non-Nisei law firm.

She eventually opened her own law firm in Little Tokyo, Los Angeles and was one of the founders of the Japanese-American Bar Association and the California Women's Bar. Sakamoto's husband, Tohru Takahashi, was a farmer in New Mexico, and they owned various farms in California (she even managed some of them while simultaneously taking on cases).

Sakamoto died in 1994.

== See also ==
- List of first women lawyers and judges in California
