= Hugh Ellwood Macbeth Sr. =

Civil rights lawyer

- Born: 1884; Charleston, South Carolina, U.S.
- Died: 1956 (aged 71–72)
- Education: Fisk University 1905; Harvard Law School 1908
- Occupation: Civil rights attorney

Hugh Ellwood Macbeth Sr. (1884-1956) was an African American attorney who defended Japanese American wartime legal rights in California during the Second World War.

== Education and early career ==
Hugh Macbeth Sr. was born in 1884 in Charleston, North Carolina. He attended Fisk University (graduating in 1905) and completed his legal education at Harvard Law School in 1908. He practiced law in Maryland until 1912, and became the founding editor of the Baltimore Times during that time. He relocated to Los Angeles, California, during 1912-1913, where he opened a law office with fellow Harvard Law graduate Willis Oliver Tyler (Macbeth Sr.'s brother Gobert Eliot Macbeth later joined the firm). Nevertheless, in 1927, Macbeth Sr. led a group of African American and Jewish lawyers in successfully challenging the exclusion of either group from the California Bar Association. In 1938, he became the executive secretary of the California Race Relations Commission, which was created by then California governor Frank Merriam.

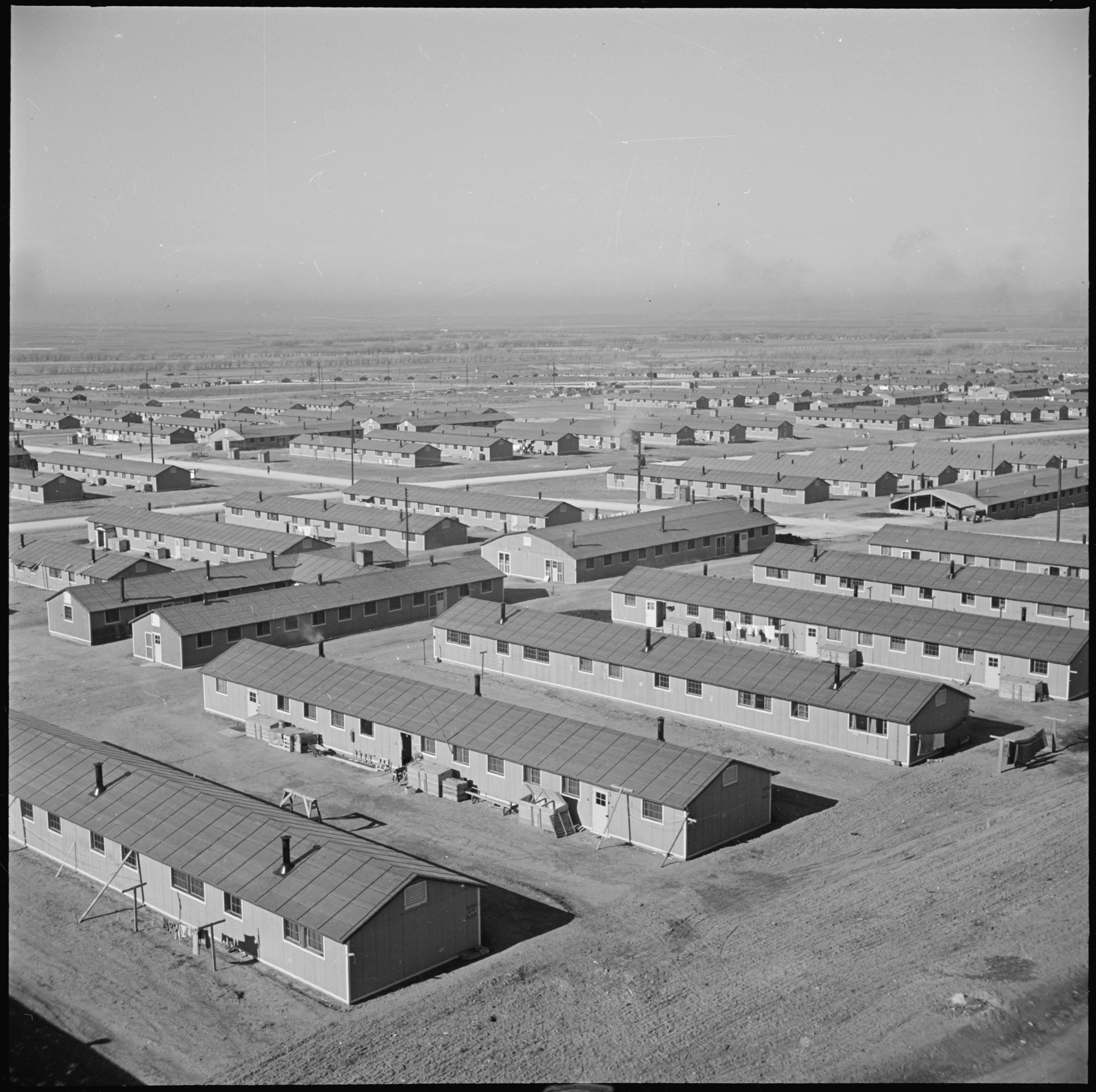
Granada Relocation Center. Many Japanese Americans were interned in camps like this one. Sakamoto, one of key attorneys in MacBeth's law firm, had been imprisoned in this camp in Colorado.

== Representing the legal rights for Japanese Americans during WWII ==
With Executive Order 9066 was issued by the US government, Japanese Americans were ordered into internment camps. Macbeth Sr. represented Japanese Americans before the US government on this issue. In 1943, he joined the legal team of the Japanese American Citizens League (JACL) to work on the Regan v. King case, which was a court case which sought the removal of voting rights for Japanese Americans during wartime. He was on the Korematsu v. United States legal team which challenged Executive Order 9066 which authorized the internment of Japanese Americans. He signed the amicus curiae brief for the case. Unfortunately, the US Supreme Court ruled on this case that the US constitutional allowed for incarceration based on race, although the conviction was later overturned.

In 1945, he was part of the legal team that represented Fred and Kajiro Oyama as they challenged the Alien Land Act in California. The case went all the way to the United States Supreme Court as Oyama v. California. The Supreme Court ruled in 1948 that enforcement of the act must end. This created a key legal precedent for future rulings concerning segregation.

== Post-WWII work as an attorney ==
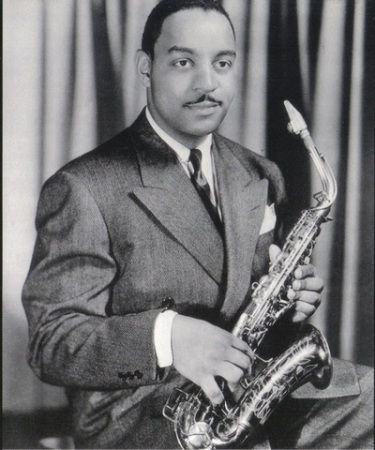
Benny Carter was represented by Hugh Ellwood MacBeth Sr. in Davis v. Carter (1948). Image from a 1943 photo.

After the war, Japanese Americans were released from the internment. By this time, Macbeth Sr.'s son Hugh Macbeth Jr. became a partner in his father's law firm, and worked on the Oyama case. Macbeth hired as an associate California's first Japanese American female lawyer, Chiyoko Sakamoto, who had been released from internment in 1947. Another associate of his law firm was Eva M. Mack, who worked as co-counsel with him on the California Supreme Court case Davis vs. Carter (1948)—a housing discrimination suit filed against jazz musician Benny Carter. Mack, who was an associate at Macbeth Sr.'s firm until his death in 1956, expanded her legal repertoire by becoming an editor for the Women Lawyers Journal (1957-1958) and teaching evening law courses. Sakamoto also opened her own law firm and became a founder of the Japanese American Bar Association and the California Women's Bar. Macbeth's son, Hugh Macbeth Jr., was named as a Commissioner and Superior Court Judge on the Los Angeles County Superior Court in 1975.

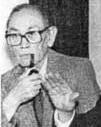
Fred Korematsu (1986)

== Recent legal research ==
For the 60th anniversary of the controversial internment of Japanese Americans during WWII, the Journal of Law and Contemporary Problems published "Korematsu" and Beyond: Japanese Americans and the Origins of Strict Scrutiny, which reviews the work of Macbeth Sr. on the Korematsu v. United States case.
