= Wael Elhalwani =

Lebanese-American businessman (born 1978)

- وائل الحلواني
- Born: January 14, 1978 (age 48); Lebanon
- Occupations: Businessman, Author

Wael Elhalwani (وائل الحلواني; born January 14, 1978) is a Lebanese-American businessman. He is the founder, CEO and director of Starbuzz Tobacco Inc., and several other companies.

== Early life ==
Born in Lebanon, Elhalwani moved to the United States aged 16. He played soccer as a youth, eventually going to university on a soccer scholarship. He has five children.

== Career ==
Elhalwani is the founding director of the companies Starbuzz Tobacco Inc, Starbuzz Entertainment, SBM Mundial, SBIT, and SBLT. He invented a tobacco product, "Starbuzz", as well as several smoking devices. In August 2014, Entrepreneur magazine in the Levant called him the "Don of Hookah."

He is also the author of two books: You Think You Know But You Have No Idea, and Wisdom of the Heart.
