= Kathryn Doi Todd =

American judge

Associate Justice of the California Court of Appeal, Second District, Division Two
- In office August 18, 2000 – January 2013
- Appointed by: Governor Gray Davis
- Preceded by: John Zebrowski

Personal details
- Born: Kathryn Asako Doi; January 14, 1942 (age 84) Los Angeles, California
- Relatives: Mia Doi Todd, daughter
- Education: Stanford University (AB); Loyola Marymount University (JD)

Kathryn Doi Todd (Japanese: 土井 麻子, born January 14, 1942) is a retired associate justice of the California Second District Court of Appeal, Division Two, having been appointed to the post by Governor Gray Davis in 2000.

== Biography ==
Kathryn Asako Doi was born in Los Angeles, California, and is of Japanese descent. She was interned at the Heart Mountain Relocation Center as an infant after President Franklin D. Roosevelt signed Executive Order 9066. After receiving her diploma from Los Angeles High School in 1959, she earned an AB in history from Stanford University in 1963 and a JD from Loyola Law School in 1970, where was Order of the Coif and editor of the Loyola Law Review. From 1971 to 1978, Todd was an attorney in Little Tokyo. She was a founder member of the Japanese American Bar Association (JABA).

In 1978, Governor Jerry Brown appointed her to the Los Angeles County Municipal Court, making her the first female Asian American judge in the United States. In 1981, Brown elevated Todd to the Los Angeles County Superior Court, a position she would hold until when Brown's former chief of staff, Governor Gray Davis, appointed her to the California Second District Court of Appeal, Division Two as of August 18, 2000. Doi retired from the bench in January 2013.

In 2014 she received the Margaret Brent Award from the American Bar Association.

== Personal life ==
On June 16, 1974, Doi married sculptor Michael C. Todd, with whom she has one daughter, Mia, who is a singer and songwriter. The couple divorced while she was on the Superior Court.

== See also ==
- John F. Aiso - first Japanese American judge in the continental U.S. (1957)
- Herbert Choy - first Asian American U.S. federal judge (1971)
- Masaji Marumoto - first Asian American territorial court justice (1956)
- Delbert E. Wong - first Chinese American judge in the continental U.S. (1959)

Legal offices
Preceded by John Zebrowski	Associate Justice of the California Court of Appeal, Second District, Division Two; 2000–2013	Succeeded by
