= Nasrin =

Nesrin
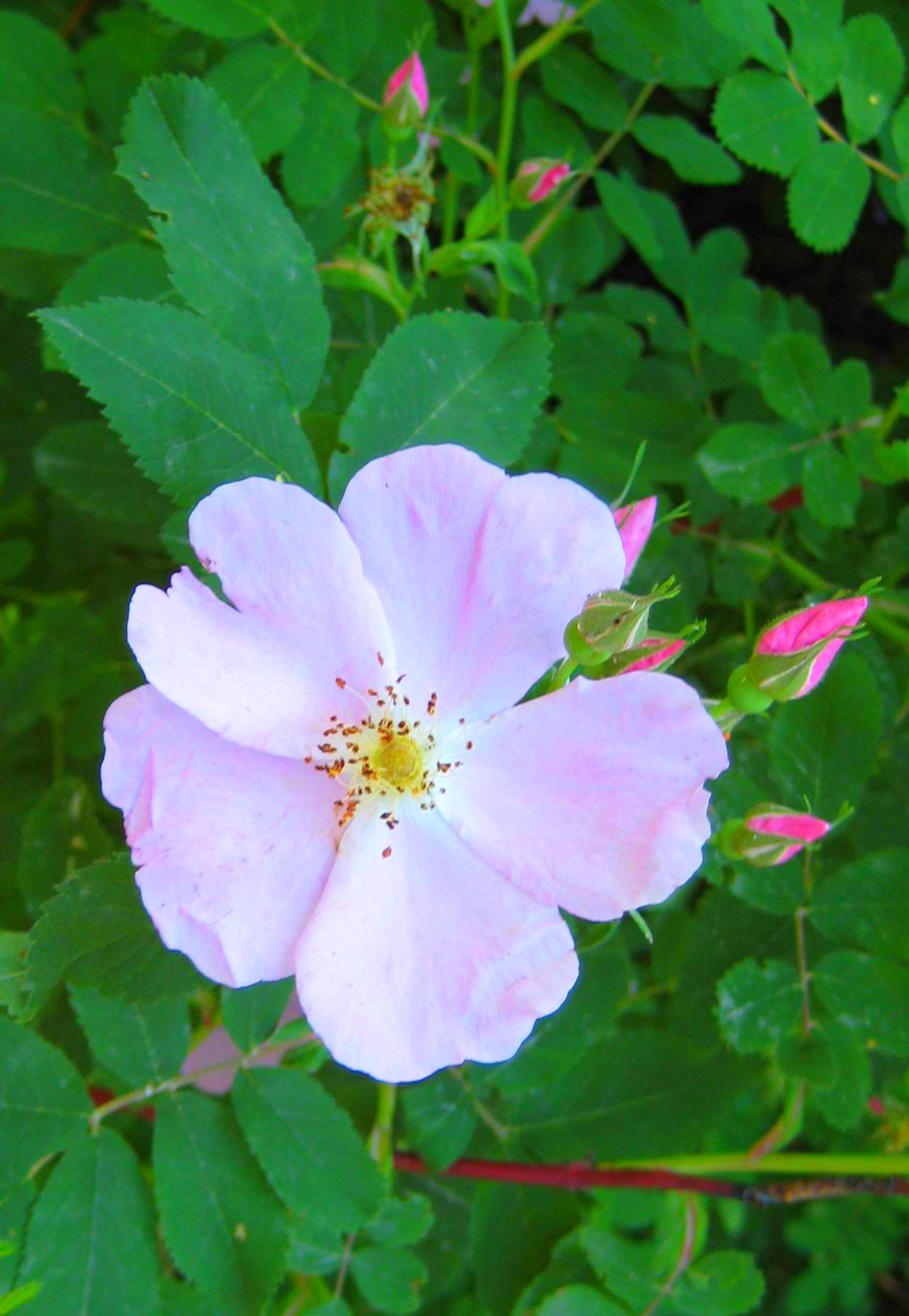
- The name Nasrin means wild rose
- Gender: Female
- Language: Persian

Origin
- Origin: Persian
- Meaning: Wild rose
- Region of origin: Eurasian

Other names
- Alternative spelling: Nasreen, Nesrine
- Variant form: Nisreen

Nasrin (translit. "nisriyn/ nisrīn"; Nesrin, Nesrine, Nazreen, or Nasreen; Persian: نسرين) is a feminine given name in Persian, meaning "wild rose". It is among the most popular names given to girls born in Iran. The name is also popular in South Asia, especially in Pakistan, India and Bangladesh, as well as being a commonly used Turkish and Kurdish and North-African (Morocco, Algeria, Tunisia and Libya) given name.

== Etymology ==
The root of the word ultimately comes from Aramaic נָצוֹרִין.

== People ==
- Nesrin Hanım (1826-1853), Imperial consort of Ottoman Sultan Abdülmejid I
- Nesrin Neşerek Kadın (1848-1876), Imperial consort of Ottoman Sultan Abdülaziz
- Nasreen Mohamedi (1937–1990), Indian artist
- Nasreen Jalil (born 1947), Pakistani politician
- Nasreen Pervin Huq (1958–2006), Bangladeshi women's rights activist
- Nasrin Rahimieh (born 1958), Iranian-American literary critic, editor, and educator
- Nesrin Nas (born 1958), Turkish politician of the Motherland Party
- Taslima Nasrin (born 1962), Bangladeshi feminist and former physician
- Nasrin Soltankhah (born 1963), Iranian politician
- Nasrin Sotoudeh (born 1963), Iranian human rights lawyer
- Nasreen Jahan (born 1966), Bangladeshi novelist
- Nasreen (born 1978), Bangladeshi film actress
- Nesrin Şamdereli (born 1979), Turkish-German screenwriter and film director
- Nesrin Cavadzade (born 1982), Turkish actress
- Nesreen Tafesh (born 1982), Syrian actress of Palestinian and Algerian descent
- Nasreen Qadri (born 1986), Israeli singer
- Naisrín Elsafty (born 1989), Irish-Egyptian singer
- Nasrin Husseini, Afghani refugee advocate, veterinary researcher, and food activist
- Nesrine Malik, Sudanese-born London-based columnist and author
- Nesreen Ghaddar, Lebanese mechanical engineer

== See also ==
- Nasrin Nush, one of seven princesses in the twelfth-century epic poem Haft Peykar by Nizami Ganjavi
- Nasrin, a 2020 documentary about Nasrin Sotoudeh (above)
- Nisreen Elsaim, Sudanese climate activist
- Nasreen, in the novel Ziba by Iranian-American author Afarin Majidi
