= H.I.G. Capital =

American private equity and alternative assets investment firm

H.I.G. Capital, LLC
- Type: Private
- Industry: Private Equity
- Founded: 1993; 33 years ago
- Founder: Sami Mnaymneh; Tony Tamer
- Headquarters: Miami, Florida, United States
- Key people: Sami Mnaymneh (Executive chairman); Tony Tamer (executive chairman); Brian Schwartz (CEO); Rick Rosen (co-president; Doug Berman (co-president)
- Products: Private Equity; Growth Equity; Real Estate; Lending; Infrastructure; Special situation
- AUM: $76 billion
- Website: hig.com

H.I.G. Capital, LLC is an American multinational private capital firm with $76 billion of capital under management. Headquartered in Miami, Florida, H.I.G. specializes in providing both debt and equity capital to middle market companies.

According to the firm’s website, H.I.G. has invested in and managed more than 400 companies, since inception. The firm’s current portfolio includes more than 100 companies with combined sales in excess of $53 billion. H.I.G. currently has over 1000 total employees, including more than 500 investment professionals worldwide.

== History ==
H.I.G. Capital was founded in 1993 by Sami Mnaymneh and Tony Tamer, both of whom previously held senior positions at the Blackstone Group and Bain & Company. The company remains under their directorship. In 2006, the company expanded to its first affiliate office in Europe, which is known as H.I.G. Europe.

In 2021, the company acquired Interpath, a restructuring company spun out of KPMG, for £380 million.

In 2021, HIG agreed to a £25m settlement with the United Kingdom’s pension regulator over allegations that it forced the insolvency of the Silentnight Group in order to buy its business out of administration in 2011 without taking on the company’s defined benefit pension scheme.

In 2025, a lawsuit brought by Dailane Investments Ltd alleged HIG Capital and its founder, Sami Mnaymneh, artificially lowered the price of a portfolio asset to deliver a windfall to HIG, breaching fiduciary duty. The claims relate to the €138.9m sale of SIAT, part of the Maillis Group, to a HIG continuation fund in 2021. As of 2025, the case is ongoing.

In January 2026, H.I.G announced it had sold Interpath to Bridgepoint Group in a deal which valued the company at £800 million. Later in April 2026, co-founder Sami Mnaymneh stepped back from his role as CEO, seeing Brian Schwartz assume the role. Mnaymneh retained his role as executive chairman with the firm.

In November 2026, H.I.G. formed Waveborn, "a platform to acquire creator-economy companies", focusing on brand relationships, content production, and creator monetization. Waveborn's first acquisition was Jake Rosen Entertainment, a creator management firm.

== Products ==
H.I.G.’s equity funds invest in management buyouts, recapitalizations, corporate carve-outs of both profitable as well as underperforming manufacturing and service businesses. The firm's debt funds invest in senior, unitranche, and junior debt financing to companies across the size spectrum, both on a primary (direct origination) and secondary basis, as well as in the secondary markets. Additionally, H.I.G. also manages a publicly traded business development corporation (BDC), WhiteHorse Finance.

H.I.G.’s real estate funds invest in value-added properties, which can benefit from improved asset management practices. Its Infrastructure funds focus on making value-add and core plus investments in the infrastructure sector.

== Offices ==
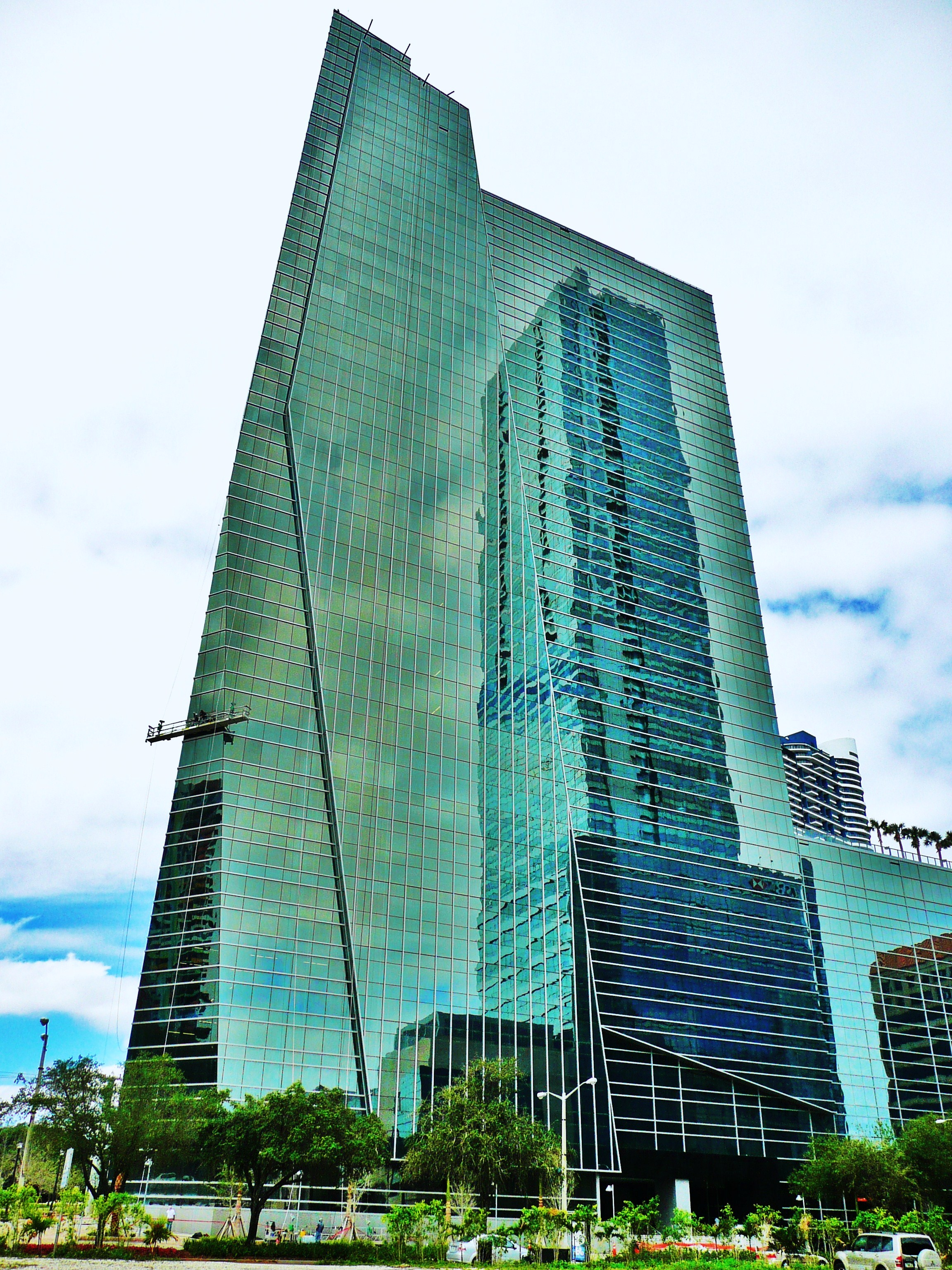
1450 Brickell reflection

The company is headquartered in Miami and has affiliate offices in several major cities across the United States, including New York City, Boston, Chicago, Dallas, Los Angeles, San Francisco, and Atlanta. Additionally, the firm has international offices located in London, Hamburg, Madrid, Milan, Paris, Luxembourg, Bogotá, Rio de Janeiro, São Paulo, Dubai, and Hong Kong.
