= Tony Tamer =

American businessman

- Born: Anthony Aouni Tamer; October 12, 1957 (age 68)
- Education: Rutgers University; Stanford University; Harvard Business School
- Spouse: Sandra Tamer
- Children: 4

Anthony Aouni Tamer (born October 12, 1957), better known as Tony Tamer, is an American billionaire businessman, and the co-founder and executive chairman of H.I.G. Capital, a global private equity and alternative assets investment firm with $75 billion of equity capital under management. The Forbes magazine lists him as the 412th richest person in the world, with a net worth of $9 billion as of October 2026.

== Education ==
Tamer earned an MBA degree from Harvard Business School, and a master's degree in electrical engineering from Stanford University. His undergraduate degree is from Rutgers University.

== Career ==
Tamer began his career at Hewlett-Packard and later at Sprint Corporation in a variety of engineering, marketing and manufacturing positions. Tamer then joined Bain & Company in 1986 where he ultimately became a partner until he left the firm in 1993. At Bain, he developed business unit and operating strategies, implemented productivity improvement initiatives, and led acquisition and divestiture activities for a number of Fortune 500 clients.

In 1993, Tamer co-founded H.I.G. Capital with Sami Mnaymneh, expanding it into a global private equity firm. H.I.G. specializes in providing investment capital to small and mid-sized companies, utilizing a flexible and operationally focused/value-added approach:

- H.I.G.’s equity funds invest in management buyouts, recapitalizations and corporate carve-outs of both profitable as well as underperforming manufacturing and service businesses.
- H.I.G.’s debt funds invest in senior, unitranche and junior debt financing to companies across the size spectrum, both on a primary (direct origination) basis, as well as in the secondary markets, through its WhiteHorse family of vehicles.
- H.I.G.’s real estate funds invest in value-added properties, which can benefit from improved asset management practices.

H.I.G. has invested in and managed more than 400 companies worldwide since inception. The firm's portfolio includes more than 100 companies with combined sales in excess of $53 billion.

== Philanthropy ==
In January 2015, Columbia University announced that Tamer and his wife Sandra made a transformative gift to establish and endow The Tamer Center for Social Enterprise, which expanded the existing Social Enterprise Program at Columbia Business School. The new funding allowed for the launch of a seed investment fund for social ventures, expansion of loan assistance and summer fellowship programs for social enterprise students, and development of the advisory network for Columbia's social entrepreneurs.

In January 2026, the Tamer family donated $50 million to the University of Miami Health System, establishing the Tamer Institute for Women's Health within UHealth and the University of Miami Miller School of Medicine.

Tamer is on the board of The Tamer Center for Social Enterprise at Columbia University and on the Dean's Council of the Harvard Kennedy School. He is a Trustee of the Museum of Modern Art, a Trustee of the Lincoln Center for the Performing Arts, a Trustee of the New York Presbyterian Hospitals, a member of the Board of Advisors of the International Rescue Committee (IRC), and is on the board of directors of Partnership for Miami. Tamer also serves on the advisory board of LIFE (Lebanese International Finance Executives). Tamer helped launch and is the Founding Chairman of COOP Careers, a non-profit which provides underprivileged college graduates with the skills and support to overcome underemployment and gain meaningful careers in the digital economy.

== Personal life ==
Tamer is married and has four daughters. He is of Lebanese descent. His wife Sandra holds a master's degree in Electrical Engineering and Computer Science from Massachusetts Institute of Technology (MIT), and is on the board of directors of Rockefeller University, Action Against Hunger, YoungArts, the RMF Foundation, Pérez Art Museum Miami, and the Tamer Center for Social Enterprise at Columbia University.
