= Edward M. Sion =

American astrophysicist (born 1946)

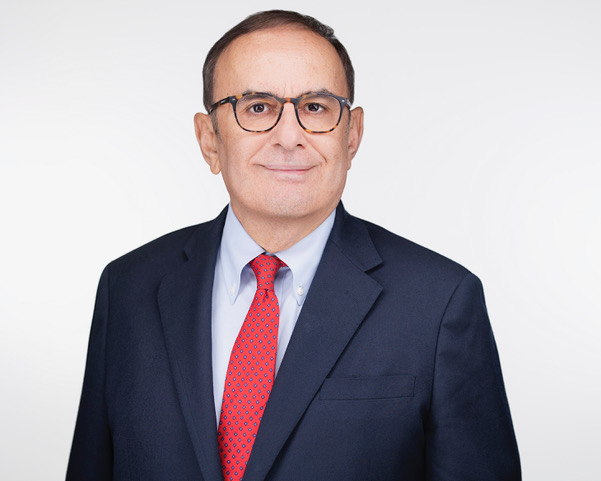
- Born: January 18, 1946 (age 80)
- Citizenship: American
- Education: University of Kansas; University of Pennsylvania
- Known for: Research on white dwarf stars
- Scientific career
- Fields: Astrophysics
- Workplaces: Villanova University

Edward M Sion (born January 18, 1946) is an American astrophysicist and a Professor Emeritus of Astrophysics and Planetary Science in the Department of Astrophysics and Planetary Science at Villanova University. He specializes in the structure and evolution of white dwarf stars and white dwarf stars in explosive binary star systems known as cataclysmic variables.

== Early life ==
Edward M. Sion is a US citizen of Lebanese descent.He was born and raised in Wichita Kansas. His mother and father were born in the USA while his paternal and maternal grandparents immigrated from Lebanon between 1904 and 1908.

Sion received a BA in Astronomy from the University of Kansas in 1968 and an MA in Astronomy from KU in 1969. He received a PhD in Astrophysics at the University of Pennsylvania in 1975.

== Career ==
In 1977, Sion co-authored the Catalogue of Spectroscopically Identified White Dwarf Stars with George P. McCook. The book was converted to an online directory by Villanova University and contains over 20,000 identified white dwarf stars. The catalog introduced the WD-number, which uses the equatorial coordinate system to identify each white dwarf on the sky. The book and database are frequently referenced in journals since its creation.

Sion led a team of collaborators who developed the fundamental classification system of white dwarf stars in 1983. This system is used worldwide, and characterizes both the chemical composition class and surface temperature of each known white dwarf star.

In 1984, Sion uncovered empirical evidence that the hydrogen-rich white dwarfs transform into helium-rich white dwarfs when deepening helium convection, as a white dwarf cools, mixes hydrogen downward.

In 1990, Sion and collaborators first proposed an alternative explanation for the metal abundances observed in some helium-rich white dwarfs, suggesting for the first time that white dwarfs such as GD 40 could be accreting asteroids or planetary bodies, disintegrated by collisions or gravitational tidal force, and polluting the white dwarf's atmosphere.

In the mid-1990s, Sion led a team of collaborators, using the Hubble Space Telescope, to unveil the physical properties of white dwarfs in explosive cataclysmic variables and how they cool and heat in response to the accretion of mass from a sun-like companion star, a process which leads to nova explosions and, for the most massive white dwarfs, supernova explosions.

In 1995, Sion carried out theoretical evolutionary model calculations with time-variable accretion to study the physics of the heating and subsequent cooling of white dwarfs in response to dwarf nova outbursts. The study showed that the dominant source of heating and cooling is due to deep compressional heating caused by the weight of the accreted gas.

From 1996, he served as associate editor of The Astrophysical Journal for six years.

The Lebanese government founded a non-profit in 2007, which would become their national academy of sciences. Sion was invited to be a founding member of the national academy, the Lebanese Academy of Sciences, a clone of the French Academy of Sciences.

Sion's studies of white dwarf stars has led to his publishing over 653 scientific articles of which 270 peer-reviewed articles have appeared in journals such the Astrophysical Journal, Astronomical Journal, Astronomy and Astrophysics (the European Journal), Publications of the Astronomical Society of the Pacific, and the Monthly Notices of the Royal Astronomical Society. Sion also acts as a featured expert on Big Think.

With over 653 scientific publications, 66 of which share authorship with Villanova students, Dr. Sion continues to have a strong impact on the field and has been ranked in the top 2% of researchers globally by Stanford University in 2019.

Sion has also been quoted in Forbes articles on white dwarf systems and the potential for surviving or disrupted planetary systems, drawing on both observational findings and theoretical models in exoplanet research.

== Books ==
- Sion, Edward M.; Tovmassian, Gaghik (2004). IAU Colloquium 194: Compact Binaries in the Galaxy and Beyond : La Paz, B.C. Sur, México, Noviembre 17-22, 2003. Vol. 20. Instituto de Astronomía. ISBN 978-9703211586.
- Sion, Edward M. (2008). Through Blue Skies to Hell: America's 'bloody 100th' in the Air War Over Germany (reprint ed.). Casemate Publishers. ISBN 978-1935149965.
- Sion, Edward M.; Vennes, Stephane; Shipman, Harry L., eds. (2005). White Dwarfs: Cosmological and Galactic Probes. Vol. 332 (Illustrated ed.). Springer Science & Business Media. ISBN 978-1402036934.
- Sion, Edward M.; Vauclair, G, eds. (2012). White Dwarfs. Vol. 366 (illustrated ed.). Springer Science & Business Media. ISBN 978-9401132305.
- Sion, Edward M. (2023). Accreting White Dwarfs: From Exoplanetary Probes to Classical Novae and Type 1a Supernovae. Institute of Physics Publishing Company, UK (AAS-IOP). ISBN 978-0750320412.

== Appointments and awards ==
- 1989 - Outstanding Faculty Research Prize - Villanova University.
- 2007 - Founding member of the Lebanese Academy of Sciences.
- 2010 - University of Kansas Associate Member, Alumni Advisory Board.
- 2014 - Co-chairman of The Third Middle East and Africa Regional IAU Meeting (MEARIM III) Beirut-Lebanon.
- 2021 - Outstanding Faculty Research Mentor Award at Villanova University.
- Elected to the Franklin Institute, Philadelphia, Science and the Arts committee (founded 1824), which confers Benjamin Franklin Medals in physics, chemistry, life sciences, and engineering.

Sion has served sabbatical appointments at Arizona State University, Centre Nationale de la Recherche Scientifique, University of Toulouse and the Hubble Space Telescope Science Institute.
