= Kamal Badr =

Lebanese-American physician and professor

Dr. Kamal Badr is a Lebanese-American physician and scientist who has been Professor of Medicine and Chair of the Department of Internal Medicine at the American University of Beirut from July 2000 to late 2006. He then was named Founding Dean of the Lebanese American University’s new medical school, a position he held until September 1, 2010. He returned to the American University of Beirut in October 2010, where he is Associate Dean for Medical Education.

== Life ==
Kamal Badr was born at The American University of Beirut Hospital on January 1,1954. He lived in Lebanon till the age of 27, after which he left for the United States, becoming a citizen in 1987.

Dr. Badr received his MD from the American University of Beirut in 1980 and completed residency training at the AUB-Medical Center followed by a 4-year fellowship in nephrology at the Brigham and Women’s and Children’s Hospitals, Harvard Medical School.

== Career ==
He joined the faculty at Vanderbilt University as Assistant and then Associate Professor (1986 to 1992), and then Emory University as Professor of Medicine, nephrology section chief at the Atlanta VA Hospital, and Director of the Center for Glomerulonephritis (1992 to 2000).

He chaired the Department of Internal Medicine at the American University of Beirut (AUB) from July 2000 until December 2006, when he was named Founding Dean of the new medical school at Lebanese American University.

In 2010, he returned to AUB as Professor of Medicine, Associate Dean for Medical Education, and Director of the Vascular Medicine Program.

== Honors and awards ==
He was elected to the American Society for Clinical Investigation in 1991, the Association of American Physicians in 2001, the Lebanese Academy of Sciences in 2009, and the Royal College of Physicians, London in 2019. He is also a member of Alpha Omega Alpha Honor Medical Society. Dr. Badr received NIH and other grant support from 1986 to 2000. His main interests are in renal microcirculatory physiology, the biology of inflammation, hypertension, and vascular disease. His research on glomerulonephritis and the regulation of inflammation has resulted in over 140 original publications in leading international journals, several discovery patents, and more than 30 chapters in Nephrology textbooks and several editions of Harrison’s Principles of Internal Medicine.

Dr. Badr has trained and mentored students, post-graduate trainees, and junior faculty members. He has lectured around the world and received awards and honors, including an Honorary Professorship at University College, London and Adjunct Professorship at Johns Hopkins University.
