= Lebanese Academy of Sciences =

Académie des Sciences du Liban (ASL) (Lebanese Academy of Sciences)
- Abbreviation: ASL
- Formation: 31 August 2007; 19 years ago
- Type: National Academy
- Headquarters: Académie des Sciences du Liban University of Balamand- Main Campus P.O. Box 33, Amioun -Al-Kurah, Lebanon
- Location: Koura District,
- Coordinates: 34°21′53″N 35°46′57″E
- Region served: Lebanon
- President: June Nasrallah
- Website: asduliban.org

The Lebanese Academy of Sciences, known officially by its French name Académie des Sciences du Liban (ASL), is a learned society dedicated to promoting the growth, invigoration, and dissemination of the sciences in Lebanon, and to fostering a world-class scientific culture in the country. The ASL was recognized by a decree of the Government of the Republic of Lebanon in August 2007.

== Mission ==
According to its charter, the ASL aims to

- Provide independent advice and guidance to governmental and private institutions on matters of scientific research and education.
- Encourage, initiate and aid research and educational programs in the sciences.
- Help the dissemination and promulgation of the results of scientific research.
- Facilitate the exchange of ideas and results with similar institutions around the world.
- Bestow awards and honors on distinguished scientists.
- Exhort young Lebanese men and women to consider careers in the sciences.
- Strengthen the links between the sciences and society by addressing the needs of the population, public health, the economy and the environment.

== History ==
The formation of the ASL was shepherded by the French Academy of Sciences, which also hosted the first meeting of the ASL in Paris on June 27, 2008. The first meeting of the ASL's Executive Committee was held in Beirut, Lebanon on October 29–31, 2008. The ASL is broadly fashioned after the French Academy of Sciences.

== Members ==
The members of the ASL are Lebanese scientists working inside and outside of Lebanon, as well as distinguished foreign scientists, including some who are of Lebanese origin, or who are keen to contribute to the growth of the sciences in Lebanon. All ASL academicians provide their services pro bono, i.e. voluntarily and without payment, as a public service.

ASL Members:

- Sir Michael Atiyah* (deceased 2019)
- Kamal Badr
- Edgar Choueiri (Founding President, 2007-2014)*
- Charles Elachi
- Charbel Farhat
- Nesreen Ghaddar (Vice-President)
- Makhluf Haddadin
- June Nasrallah * (President, 2018--)
- Mona Nemer*
- Hussein M. Zbib
- Huda Zoghbi

asterisk (*) denotes founding member
