= Charley Zivic =

American boxer

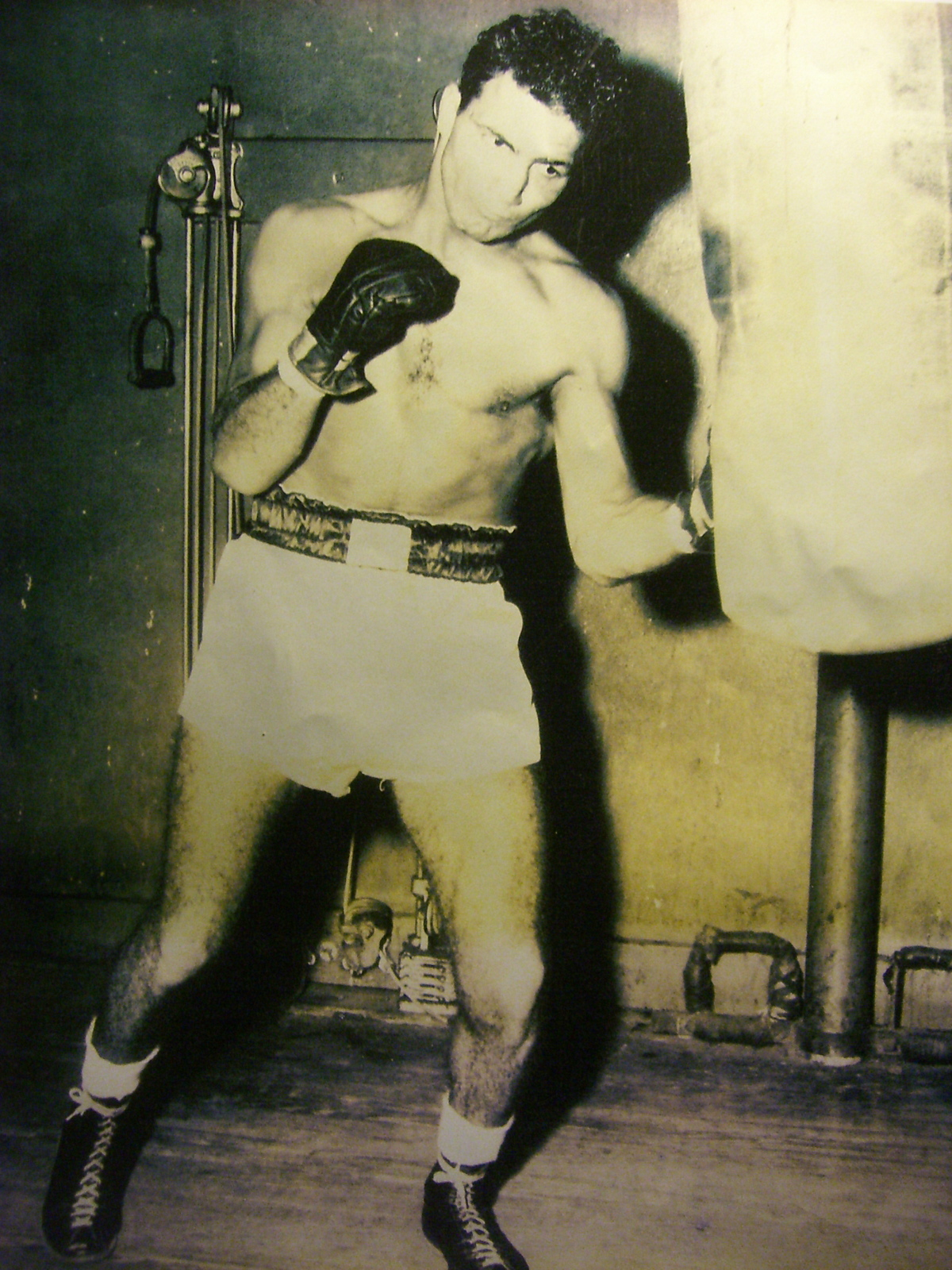

Personal information
- Nickname: Chink
- Nationality: American
- Born: January 31, 1925 Pittsburgh, Pennsylvania
- Died: November 27, 1984 (aged 59) Pittsburgh, Pennsylvania
- Height: 5 ft 9 in (1.75 m)
- Weight: Welterweight; Middleweight

Boxing career
- Stance: Orthodox

Boxing record
- Total fights: 59
- Wins: 42
- Win by KO: 14
- Losses: 13
- Draws: 4

Charley Zivic (January 31, 1925 – November 27, 1984) was a Lebanese American professional boxer from 1944 through 1951, with 42 wins, 13 losses, and 4 draws. Notably, he fought through his entire career with a metal plate in his right arm – limiting his range of motion to 5 to 7 inches – an injury he sustained when, as a ten-year-old boy, he dove off a two-story shanty roof in his Lower Hill District neighborhood - and a dead or dying right kidney.

== Career ==
In April 1950, at Duquesne Gardens in Pittsburgh, Zivic was ahead in a fight with Laurent Dauthuille, in the elimination bout for a title shot with Jake LaMotta. After getting knocked down in the ninth round, Zivic was on his feet taking the mandatory standing eight count, when Dauthuille moved out of his neutral corner and pounced on him for the kill at 1:15.

Zivic went into the ring four more times after this loss, winning two and losing two, his last loss to Gene Hairston. He'd signed to meet Bobby Dykes and was back in training at the Pittsburgh Lyceum, when he complained of an unusual weariness. He was taken to the nearby Mercy Hospital where X-rays revealed that he had a dead right kidney that dated back to 1944, the same year that he began his boxing career. Doctors explained it as not a boxing injury at all, but an old football injury from his years as a semi-professional running back.

=== Ownership and Name Change ===
For the first part of Zivic career he was owned and managed by fellow Pittsburgher and ex-Welterweight Champion of the World, Fritzie Zivic, who was not only still active in the ring himself, but also owned a growing stable of other professional prizefighters. When Fritzie lacked the adequate time to devote to Zivic's career, he sold his contract to Billy Sarkis and Hymie Schwartz, also of Pittsburgh.
