= June Nasrallah =

Lebanese-American plant scientist

June Nasrallah is Barbara McClintock Professor in the Plant Biology Section of the School of Integrative Plant Science at Cornell University. Her research focuses on plant reproductive biology and the cell-cell interactions that underlie self-incompatibility in plants belonging to the mustard (Brassicaceae) family. She was elected to the US National Academy of Sciences in 2003 for this work and her contributions generally to our understanding of receptor-based signaling in plants.

== Early life and education ==
Nasrallah was born and raised in Beirut, Lebanon. She studied at Collège Protestant Français and at the French Language Section of International College, Beirut, graduating with a Lebanese and a French Baccalauréat.

Nasrallah received a B.Sc. degree in Biology from the American University of Beirut and her Ph.D. in Genetics from Cornell University, where her doctoral research focused on the characterization of Neurospora genes involved in fungal reproduction.

== Career and research ==
Nasrallah, in collaboration with Mikhail Nasrallah, also a member of the faculty at Cornell University, initiated a research program in plant reproduction aimed at understanding the highly specific cell-cell interactions between pollen and pistil (the female reproductive structure) that ultimately lead either to successful pollination and seed production or to inhibition of pollen tube growth and failure to set seed. The focus of their research is self-incompatibility, a general term that encompasses several independently-evolved pre-zygotic genetic mechanisms that prevent self-fertilization when a pollination involves pistil and pollen that express the same variant of one or more self-incompatibility loci. Self-incompatibility is manifested by the lack of seed set resulting from disruption of germination of pollen grains or growth of pollen tubes within the pistil as they proceed from the stigma towards the ovules. In essence, self-incompatibility mechanisms are highly specific self/nonself mate recognition systems which confer on cells of the pistil the ability to discriminate between pollen grains that are defined as "self" and "nonself" on the basis of genetic identity at self-incompatibility loci, resulting in specific inhibition of "self" pollen.

The existence of self-incompatibility was appreciated by early scientists, including Charles Darwin, who recognized it as a natural system that serves to promote hybrid vigor in several plant species and as a major driver of plant evolution. The genetics and cytological manifestations of self-incompatibility were well worked out for several plant families by the middle of the twentieth century. However, a mechanistic understanding of self-incompatibility had to await the advent of molecular approaches in the 1980s. The Nasrallah laboratory applied these approaches to investigate the self-incompatibility system of the Brassicaceae. It had been shown that specificity of the self-incompatibility response in this family is controlled by a single locus called the S locus and that "self" pollen is arrested at the surface of stigma epidermal cells resulting in the failure of pollen germination and pollen tube growth into the pistil. By analyzing self-incompatibility in Brassica species and building on the immunochemical identification of stigma proteins that segregated with the S locus, the Nasrallah group demonstrated that the recognition of "self" pollen is based on the activity of two highly polymorphic, co-adapted, and tightly-linked genes contained within the S locus. One gene encodes the S-locus receptor kinase (SRK), a transmembrane protein expressed in stigma epidermal cells, and the second gene encodes the S-locus cystine-rich (SCR), a small diffusible peptide component of the outer pollen coating. Thus, the S locus was shown to be a complex locus and its variants, which had been called S alleles, are now more appropriately referred to as S haplotypes.

Subsequent biochemical experiments demonstrated that SCR is the ligand for the SRK receptor and that the SRK-SCR interaction is S-haplotype specific (i.e. it only occurs when the SRK and SCR proteins are encoded in the same S haplotype). Consequently, it is only when the stigma is pollinated with "self" pollen that SCR can bind and activate its cognate SRK, thus triggering a signaling cascade within stigma epidermal cells that ultimately leads to arrest of pollen germination and tube growth.

An important development in the study of self-incompatibility in the Brassicaceae was the successful transfer of the SI trait into the normally self-fertile model plant Arabidopsis thaliana by transformation with SRK-SCR gene pairs from self-incompatible A. lyrata and Capsella grandiflora. Not only did this successful experiment provide proof that the SRK and SCR genes are the sole determinants of self-incompatibility specificity, but it also opened novel avenues of research. The introduction of several SI specificities into A. thaliana allowed in planta functional analysis of in vitro-generated receptor and ligand variants and identification of the specific amino-acid residues responsible for productive SRK-SCR interactions, results that were confirmed by high-resolution structural analysis of the SRK-SCR complex in Jijie Chai's laboratory. Additionally, analysis of SRK-SCR transformants of various Arabidopsis thaliana accessions identified the genetic basis of some of the processes responsible for transitions from out-crossing to self-fertilizing modes of mating in Arabidopsis thaliana and more generally in the Brassicaceae family.

== Honors and awards ==
- Elected member of the US National Academy of Sciences (2003)
- Recipient of the Martin Gibbs Medal from the American Society of Plant Biologists (2003)
- Awarded an Honorary Doctorate in Humane Letters from the American University of Beirut (2023) for her significant contribution to the study of plant self-incompatibility and evolutionary transitions to self-fertility in the Brassicaceae
- President and Founding Member of the Lebanese Academy of Sciences
