= USS Naifeh =

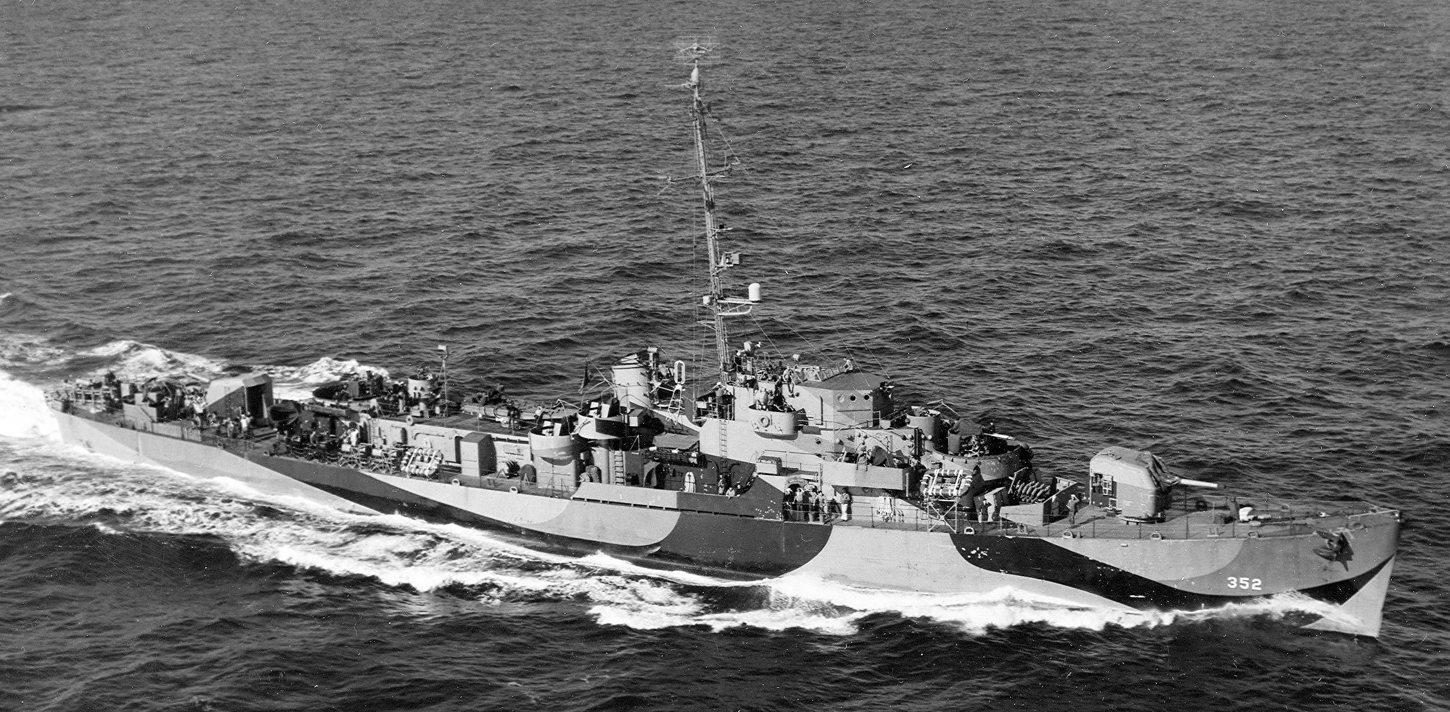
- USS Naifeh underway in August 1944

History

United States
- Name: Naifeh
- Namesake: Alfred Naifeh
- Builder: Consolidated Steel Corporation, Orange, Texas
- Laid down: 29 December 1943
- Launched: 29 February 1944
- Commissioned: 4 July 1944
- Decommissioned: 17 June 1960
- Stricken: 1 January 1966
- Fate: Sunk as a target 11 July 1966

General characteristics
- Class & type: John C. Butler-class destroyer escort
- Displacement: 1,350 long tons (1,372 t)
- Length: 306 ft (93 m)
- Beam: 36 ft 8 in (11.18 m)
- Draft: 9 ft 5 in (2.87 m)
- Propulsion: 2 boilers, 2 geared turbine engines, 12,000 shp (8,900 kW); 2 propellers
- Speed: 24 knots (44 km/h; 28 mph)
- Range: 6,000 nmi (11,000 km; 6,900 mi) at 12 kn (22 km/h; 14 mph)
- Complement: 14 officers, 201 enlisted
- Armament: 2 × single 5 in (127 mm) guns; 2 × twin 40 mm (1.6 in) AA guns; 10 × single 20 mm (0.79 in) AA guns; 1 × triple 21 in (533 mm) torpedo tubes; 8 × depth charge throwers; 1 × Hedgehog ASW mortar; 2 × depth charge racks

USS Naifeh (DE-352) was a John C. Butler-class destroyer escort in service with the United States Navy from 1944 to 1960. She was sunk as a target in 1966.

== History ==
USS Naifeh was named for Navy Lieutenant (Junior Grade) Alfred Naifeh (5 January 1915 – 16 October 1942) who died when the destroyer USS Meredith sank during the Solomon Islands campaign of World War II. Lt. (j.g.) Naifeh was posthumously awarded the Navy and Marine Corps Medal. Naifeh's keel was laid down on 29 December 1943 at the Consolidated Steel Corporation shipyard in Orange, Texas. The vessel was launched on 29 February 1944, sponsored by Mrs. Rathia Naifeh, mother of Lt. (j.g.) Naifeh; and commissioned on 4 July 1944.

=== World War II ===
After commissioning, Naifeh trained and conducted shakedown off Bermuda, then had training ship duty out of Norfolk, Virginia. The ship departed Brooklyn, New York, on 6 October 1944 on the first of 2 voyages escorting convoys to Europe and North Africa. Naifeh departed New York on 13 January 1945 and steamed via the Panama Canal to the Pacific, arriving at Manus Island, Admiralty Islands on 20 February.

The destroyer escort was assigned to the Philippine Sea Frontier, and was based at Leyte Gulf. She was primarily occupied in convoy duty until the end of the war, escorting tankers and other auxiliaries to New Guinea, Ulithi, Palau, Guam, Manila, and Okinawa. Naifeh performed other duties such as weather ship, search and rescue work, and carrying mail. Once she displayed the three star flag of Commander Philippine Sea Frontier as Vice Admiral Kauffman was embarked on an inspection tour of the islands. She rescued the crew of SS Glenns Ferry on 10 October 1945 after the merchantman had grounded near Batag Island, Philippines. Naifeh stood by with a watch set on the grounded ship until a salvage crew arrived from Manila.

She was detached from the Philippine Sea Frontier on 27 November 1945 and proceeded to San Diego, California, arriving there on 17 December. She decommissioned on 27 June 1946 and entered the Pacific Reserve Fleet at San Diego.

=== Korean War ===
With the start of the Korean War, she recommissioned on 26 January 1951. Naifeh left San Diego on 16 April, assigned to the United Nations Escort and Blockade Force. She took station off Songjin Harbor, North Korea, on 28 June. The next months were occupied in shelling Communist military and logistics facilities, along with patrol action to clear the area of floating mines, junks, and possible submarines. She then screened escort carrier USS Sicily and HMS Glory off the west coast of Korea.

Naifeh returned to San Francisco in November 1951. From early March 1952 to July, she was engaged in training exercises off the West Coast. In early July, the destroyer escort sailed from San Diego for Korea to rejoin Task Force 95, Blockade and Escort Group. Naifeh was assigned to the northeast coast of Korea in the Songjin-Chongjin area. Here she fired on enemy shore positions, railroads, and industrial targets.

Once bracketed by enemy shore fire, she successfully maneuvered out of range. With other assignments, she aided Republic of Korea Navy torpedo boats in interdiction missions against enemy supply lines. In late fall, Naifeh was flagship of the Wonsan Element Commander, protecting United States and Korean minesweepers and firing on shore targets. When USS Lewis was hit by artillery fire, Naifeh provided protective counter-battery fire as she laid a smokescreen to cover her withdrawal. In addition to blockade duty, the destroyer escort fired on North Korean supply movements in the Wonsan area. She returned to San Diego in December 1952.

=== Cold War ===
Naifeh again deployed to WestPac in mid-November 1953, operating off Japan, Okinawa, and Taiwan. May 1954 was spent with Marines conducting landing exercises off Pusan, Korea. She left Sasebo on 7 June 1954, arriving at San Diego on 26 June for a summer in operational training off the West Coast, highlighted by PACTRAEX and a visit to Seattle, Washington. Naifeh left San Diego on 21 November, arriving at Yokosuka on 9 December for patrol duty off the eastern coast of Korea and anti-submarine training. She assisted in the evacuation of the Tachen Islands in late January and February 1955, and returned to San Diego on 1 June.

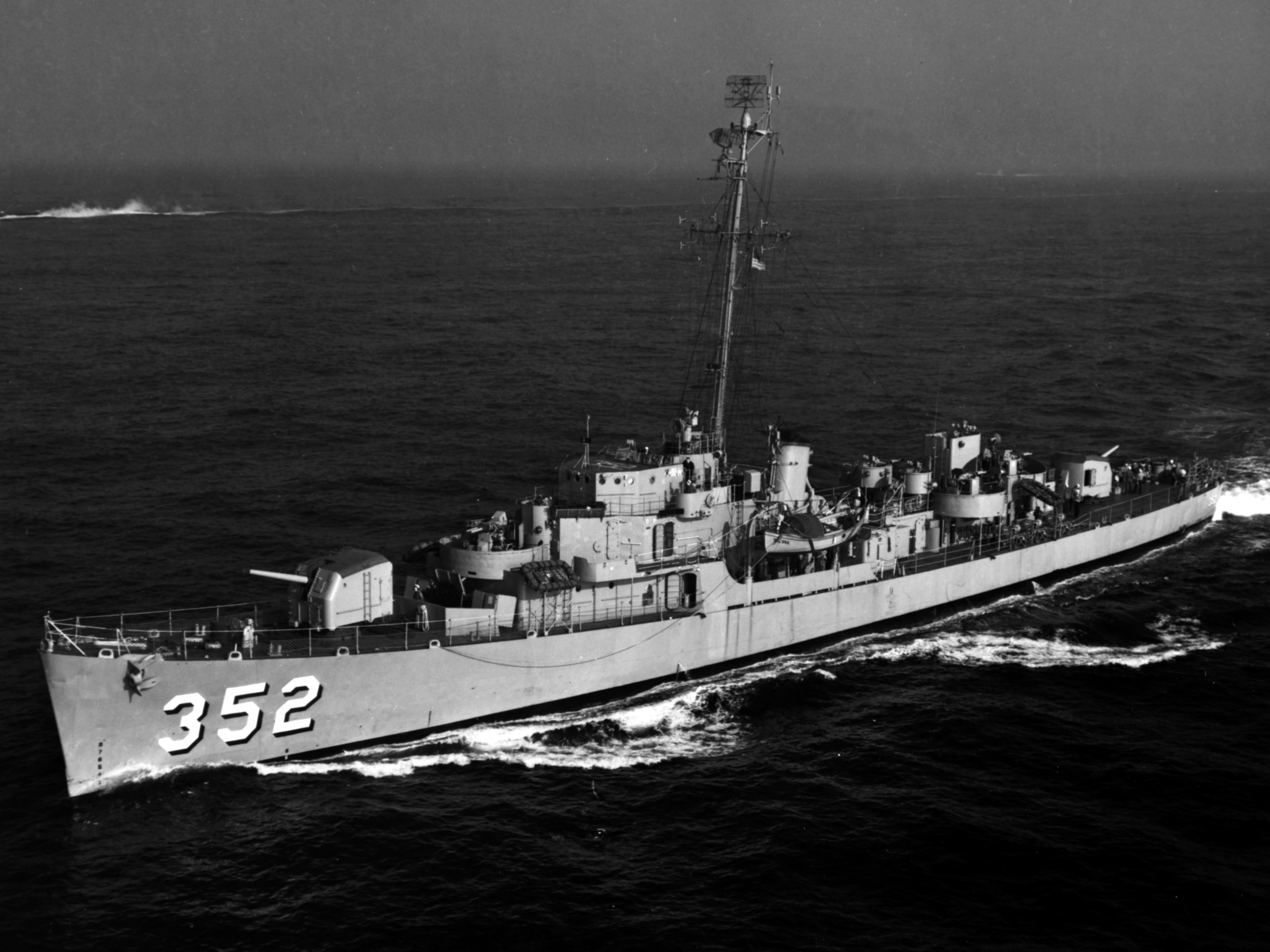
Naifeh in 1956.

In early March 1956, the ship sailed for her fourth WestPac deployment. Based at Guam, the ship acted as a search and rescue ready duty ship and participated in five surveillance patrols of the Northern Marianas, Bonin, and Caroline Islands before returning to Long Beach on 24 August. The remainder of 1956 and early 1957 were occupied with training operations off the California coast.

Leaving Long Beach, the destroyer escort once again deployed to the western Pacific, arriving at Guam on 30 April. In the first part of May, Naifeh made a patrol in the Bonin Islands. She departed Guam on 18 May and sailed for Sasebo, where she arrived on 23 May. She operated out of Sasebo and Subic Bay on patrol duties for the rest of her deployment until 12 July, when she departed Yokosuka and sailed to San Diego, arriving there on 28 July.

Naifeh then engaged in coastal operations off the West Coast until 17 June 1960, when she decommissioned at San Francisco. Berthed at Mare Island until 1 January 1966, when she was struck from the Naval Vessel Register, she was towed to San Diego in early 1966 for stripping prior to being used as a target to destruction. In July, Naifeh was sunk as a target off San Clemente Island by a combination of naval gunfire and aircraft.

== Honors ==
Naifeh received three battle stars for Korean War service.

=== Awards, citations and campaign ribbons ===
Combat Action Ribbon (retroactive)
American Campaign Medal
Asiatic-Pacific Campaign Medal
World War II Victory Medal
National Defense Service Medal (with one service star)
Korean Service Medal (with three service stars)
Philippine Liberation Medal
United Nations Korea Medal
Republic of Korea War Service Medal
