= Moustafa T. Chahine =

Moustafa Chahine
- Born: January 1, 1935; Beirut, Lebanon
- Died: March 23, 2011 (aged 76); La Canada-Flintridge, United States
- Education: University of Washington; University of California at Berkeley
- Known for: Atmospheric sounding AIRS Team Leader; GEWEX SSG Chairman
- Spouse: Marina
- Children: 2
- Scientific career
- Fields: Atmospheric Remote Sensing
- Institutions: Jet Propulsion Laboratory, California Institute of Technology

Moustafa T. Chahine (1 January 1935 - 23 March 2011) was an atmospheric scientist and an international leader in atmospheric remote sensing using satellite observations. He was the Science Team Leader for the Atmospheric Infrared Sounder on NASA's Earth Observing System Aqua satellite, and the Chairman of the Global Energy and Water Exchanges (GEWEX) Science Steering Group of the World Climate Research Program (WCRP).

== Education ==
Chahine was born in Beirut, Lebanon. He moved to the U.S. in 1954 and attended the University of Washington, receiving the B.S. and M.S. degrees in aeronautical engineering in 1956 and 1957, respectively. He received the Ph.D. in mechanical engineering from the University of California at Berkeley in 1960, before moving to start his career at the Jet Propulsion Laboratory (JPL) of the California Institute of Technology.

== Career ==
At JPL, Chahine initially studied shock waves generated by space capsules reentering the Earth atmosphere. He then worked on methods to derive atmospheric temperature and composition information from radiation received remotely from instruments in space. He developed a relaxation method for exact inverse solution of the radiative transfer equation, and applied it successfully to derive Earth atmospheric temperature and water vapor profiles. He also used the method to derive atmospheric temperature and composition profiles for the atmospheres of Venus, Mars and Jupiter. Chahine and colleagues extended his method to include complementary information from Earth-orbiting infrared and microwave sounder instruments, accounting for the presence of clouds, to produce the first maps of global surface temperature from space.

Chahine was the Science Team Leader for the Atmospheric Infrared Sounder (AIRS), an instrument designed to measure atmospheric and surface temperature, water vapor and cloud properties, as well as trace greenhouse gases such as ozone, carbon monoxide, carbon dioxide, and methane, which he successfully proposed for development starting in 1978. He became a member of the Earth System Science Committee (ESSC) of the National Academy of Sciences, chaired by Francis Bretherton, which formulated the science rationale for a NASA multidecadal Earth Observing System (EOS). The AIRS instrument was formally selected as part of the Earth Observing System (EOS) in 1988, and was launched on the second EOS platform, the Aqua satellite, in 2002.

A major advance using AIRS data was Chahine's derivation of atmospheric carbon dioxide (CO_{2}) in the mid-troposphere. Chahine produced the first satellite-derived global map of atmospheric CO_{2}, while animations of several years of data displayed the global distributions of both the seasonal cycle and the long-term upward trend in atmospheric CO_{2}.

The science data products from AIRS were widely praised. In 2006, a study by scientists at the National Oceanic and Atmospheric Administration demonstrated that use of AIRS data in weather forecasting models significantly improved forecast "skill". The current generation of European meteorological satellites now host an AIRS-like sounder, the Infrared Atmospheric Sounding Interferometer; while a similar instrument, the Cross-track Infrared Sounder, was launched in 2011 aboard NASA's new Suomi NPP satellite, the forerunner of the next-generation of U.S. weather satellites.

In 1989 Chahine became the first chairman of the Science Steering Group of the World Climate Research Program's Global Energy and Water Cycle Experiment (GEWEX). He served in this role until 1999, during which time the steering group established important connections amongst the international GEWEX community, bringing together satellite-based data collection and climate modeling.

== Honors ==
- Member of U.S. National Academy of Engineering
- NASA Exceptional Scientific Achievement Medal, 1969
- NASA Outstanding Leadership Medal, 1984
- William T. Pecora Award, 1989
- AMS Jule G. Charney Award, 1991
- AIAA Losey Atmospheric Sciences Award, 1993
- COSPAR William Nordberg Medal, 2002
- NASA Exceptional Scientific Achievement, 2007
- SPIE George W. Goddard Award, 2010.

== Selected publications ==
- Chahine M. (1992): The hydrological cycle and its influence on climate. Chahine, M. (1992). "The hydrological cycle and its influence on climate". Nature. 359 (6394): 373–380. Bibcode:1992Natur.359..373C. doi:10.1038/359373a0. S2CID 4243240.

== Lectures ==
- 1991 - Imaging science in remote sensing Lecture sponsored by the Dept. of Electrical and Computer engineering, University of California, San Diego. Electrical and Computer Engineering Distinguished Lecture Series. Digital object made available by UC San Diego Library.
