= Alfred Naifeh =

Namesake of the USS Naifeh

Alfred Naifeh (January 5, 1915 – October 16, 1942) was a law clerk, United States Navy hero during World War II, and the namesake of the USS Naifeh.

== Early life ==
Alfred Naifeh was born on January 5, 1915, in Covington, Tennessee, to a Lebanese immigrant family from Jdeidet Marjeyoun, Lebanon. He was raised in Norman, Oklahoma.

He graduated from the University of Oklahoma in 1937 with a BA and a LL.B. in 1940. Naifeh was awarded a Cook Fellowship at the University of Michigan Law School and received an LLM degree in 1941. He was a member of Phi Beta Kappa and Order of the Coif, a legal honor society.

== Career ==
Following graduation, he was admitted to the Oklahoma Bar Association and became a member of the American Bar Association. He served as a law clerk in Oklahoma City for Alfred P. Murrah, judge of the U.S. Circuit Court of Appeals of the 10th Judicial District.

== Navy and death ==
Naifeh was a member of the United States Navy Reserves Officer Training Corps and was called to active duty for World War II. On July 5, 1941, he received a commission as an ensign in the Navy Supply Corps. On February 27, 1942, Naifeh was assigned to the USS Meredith (DD-434) as destroyer division disbursing officer. On October 1, 1942, he was promoted to lieutenant (junior grade).

During the Battle of the Solomons Islands, the USS Meredith, was struck by a Japanese air raid and rapidly sank on October 16, 1942, near Guadalcanal. Naifeh worked for two days and nights to locate and tend to his wounded shipmates, taking survivors to life rafts. On the third day, he fought off sharks that were attacking his shipmates. As a result of his continuing efforts to save his shipmates, he was overcome by exhaustion and died on October 16, 1942. Of the 400 crewmen of the USS Meredith, only seventy survived.

== Honors ==
Naifeh was posthumously awarded the Navy and Marine Corps Medal and the Purple Heart. At the ceremony for the former, the citation read:

The President of the United States of America takes pride in presenting the Navy and Marine Corps Medal (Posthumously) to Lieutenant, Junior Grade Alfred Naifeh (NSN: 0-111192), United States Navy, for heroic conduct on 15 October 1942. After the sinking of the U.S.S. MEREDITH (DD-434), Lieutenant, Junior Grade Naifeh persisted in swimming back and forth among the life rafts on which the survivors were clinging, rendering invaluable aid to the men who were wounded or exhausted. He finally was overcome by exhaustion, which resulted in his death.

In 1944, The United States Navy named a John C. Butler-class destroyer escort ship the USS Naifeh (DE-352) after him. His mother, Rathia Naifeh, christened the ship at Orange, Texas on February 29, 1944. The ship was commissioned on July 4, 1944. On June 27, 1946, the ship was decommissioned and became part of the Pacific Reserve Fleet in San Diego. In January 1951, the USS Naifeh was reinstated to assist in the Korean War and was used in the Pacific until her final decommissioning on June 17, 1960.

=== Decorations ===
- Purple Heart
- Navy and Marine Corps Medal
