= Ziad Makkawi =

- Born: December 25, 1961 (age 64); New York City, United States
- Education: Columbia University, New York University Stern School of Business, and Rice University
- Occupations: Entrepreneur and investor
- Spouse: Amel Mekkawi
- Children: 3

Ziad Makkawi (December 25, 1961) is a French/Lebanese entrepreneur and investor, born in New York City to Lebanese parents.

== Early life and education ==
He was born in 1961 and spent his childhood in New York City, Washington, D.C., Beirut, Berlin, and London. Makkawi obtained a master's in international affairs from Columbia University in New York, an MBA in finance from New York University’s Stern School, and a BA in economics from Rice University in Houston.

== Career ==
Makkawi is the founder and CEO of Equiam, a San Francisco-based investment manager disrupting the traditional venture capital and private growth equity investment model by applying a more rules-based, systematic and data driven investment strategy. Prior to Equiam, Makkawi worked in emerging markets the investment banking, asset management and private equity activities. He has served as chief investment officer; chief executive officer; board member and chairman at numerous organizations globally.

Makkawi began his career with JP Morgan on Wall Street in 1986. He later joined Elf Aquitaine in Geneva before moving to the Middle East to co-found Lebanon Invest, which was later sold to Bank Audi, and then Middle East Capital Group as managing director responsible for capital markets.

In 2000, Makkawi moved to Dubai to build and run Shuaa Capital’s financial Services business, including asset management, proprietary trading, capital markets, research and brokerage activities. In 2004 he was appointed CEO of Dubai Bank and in 2006 he founded and ran as chairman and CEO Algebra Capital, a MENA-focused asset management firm he later sold to global asset manager Franklin Templeton in 2010.

In 2013 he was appointed CEO of Istithmar World the PE investment arm of Dubai World, a multi-billion global portfolio across multiple sectors, including hospitality, financial services, retail, logistics, wellness, and real estate.

Makkawi sat on the advisory board of Crypto1, a Nasdaq-listed $230MM SPAC, and was an advisor/investment committee member on the Dubai Future District Fund, an AED 1 billion Fund targeting the growth of fintech and the future economy. Makkawi previously served as director on numerous boards, including MECG (Beirut); National Bonds (UAE); Amwal (Qatar); Franklin Templeton International ME (UAE); Jadara Capital (UAE); International Hotel Resorts (Malta); Gulf Africa Bank (Kenya); Blue Gate Capital Partners (BVI); Pension Insurance Corporation (UK); Istithmar P&O Estates (UK); Art Sawa (UAE); Algebra Capital (UAE); Capital Management House (Bahrain); Tigris Enterprises (Iraq). He also oversaw Istithmar’s investments on the boards of Barneys (NYC); Cirque du Soleil (Canada), as well as dozens of funds.

== Recognition and other interests ==
Makkawi has been a frequent speaker at events and conferences. He served on and acted as chairman of the Young President Organization's emirates chapter and chaired the YPO Global Art Network Committee.

Makkawi has promoted and invested in young entrepreneurs in the digital space in the MENA region. Makkawi has been a promoter and collector of Arab Contemporary Art and sponsored Art Sawa one of the region’s art galleries promoting talent from the Middle East.

== Personal life ==
Makkawi is married with three children. He speaks five languages.
