= Hussein M. Zbib =

American engineer (1958–2020)

Hussein M. Zbib (November 26, 1958 – February 10, 2020) was a Lebanese-born American engineer. He was a professor in School of Mechanical and Materials Engineering at Washington State University, where he has also served as director of the School of Mechanical and Materials Engineering and director of the Computational Mechanics and Materials Laboratory. His research expertise was in the area of thermo-mechanical behavior and properties of solids. Zbib was recognized for his work on the theory of 3D dislocation dynamics and defects in metals, multi-scale modeling of metal plasticity, and strain gradient plasticity theory.

Zbib was affiliated with Materials Science and Engineering program and Center of Materials Research at Washington State University. He held joint appointment as Lab Fellow at Pacific Northwest National Laboratory. He was a member of the Advisory Board of the International Journal of Plasticity; Member of the Board of Review of Metallurgical and Materials Transactions A; Member of the International Advisory Board: Materials Science Research International, Japan. He was the chair of the joint ASME MD-AMD committee on constitutive equations and serves on the ASME-MD Executive Committee. Zbib received 1994 Research Excellence Award from the College of Engineering at WSU, the 1994, 2000, and 2015 Research award from MME at WSU. He received the NSF Research Initiation Award, was nominated for the ASEE Dow Young Faculty Award, and received a NATO Fellowship.

Zbib died on February 10, 2020, at his home in Pullman. A memorial service was held on March 6, 2020, at Washington State University.

== Honors ==
- Fellow of the American Society of Mechanical Engineers (2002)
- Computational Mechanics Achievement Award – Hussein M. Zbib (2003)
- Member of the Academy of Mechanical Engineering and Engineering Mechanics (2004)
- Founding Member of the Lebanese Academy of Sciences (2006)
- Khan International Award for Outstanding Lifelong Contribution to the field of Plasticity (2010)
- Fellow of American Academy of Advancement of Science (2011)
- Regent Professor at Washington State University (2018)
