= Edgar Choueiri =

Lebanese American plasma physicist (born 1961)

Edgar Y. Choueiri
- Born: 1961 (age 64–65); Lebanon
- Scientific career
- Fields: Plasma Physics, Aerospace Engineering
- Institutions: Princeton University

Edgar Y. Choueiri (born 1961 in Lebanon) is a Lebanese American plasma physicist and previously president of the Lebanese Academy of Sciences. He is best known for clarifying the role of plasma instabilities in spacecraft electric thrusters (see plasma propulsion), for conceiving and developing new spacecraft propulsion concepts and, more recently, for his work on 3D audio.

== Career ==
Choueiri is professor of applied physics and aerospace engineering at Princeton University. At Princeton, he also serves as director of the electric propulsion and plasma dynamics laboratory, director of Princeton's engineering physics program, and the principal investigator of Princeton University's 3D audio and applied acoustics lab (3D3A). He is Fellow of the American Institute of Aeronautics and Astronautics (AIAA) and previously president of the Electric Rocket Propulsion Society.

In 2004, Choueiri was knighted (Medal of the Order of the Cedars, Rank of Knight) for his work in astronautics by the president of the Republic of Lebanon.
