= Japanese American Bar Association =

American legal organization, founded 1976

- Abbreviation: JABA
- Formation: 1976
- Headquarters: Los Angeles, California
- President: Harumi Hata
- President-Elect: Colin M. Kawaguchi
- Vice President: Emily T. Kuwahara
- Vice President: Gary Tokumori
- Website: https://www.jabaonline.org/

The Japanese American Bar Association (JABA) is an American legal organization offering Japanese American legal professionals a forum to discuss issues and network. It has been on the forefront of advocacy on many issues affecting Japanese Americans. It is based in Los Angeles, California and was founded in 1976.

The organization holds an annual gala where it honors members of the community for impactful work on behalf of the community. The gala is also where new members of the organization's board of governors get sworn in.

The organization has a number of regional chapters as well as a number of working groups.

In 2017, JABA led the successful effort urging the Supreme Court of California to grant Japanese-American Sei Fujii honorary membership in the State Bar of California. JABA has been active in providing legal support to survivors of the incarceration of Japanese Americans in appealing incorrect redress denials since the passage of the Civil Liberties Act of 1988.
