= Lebanese Americans =

Americans of Lebanese descent

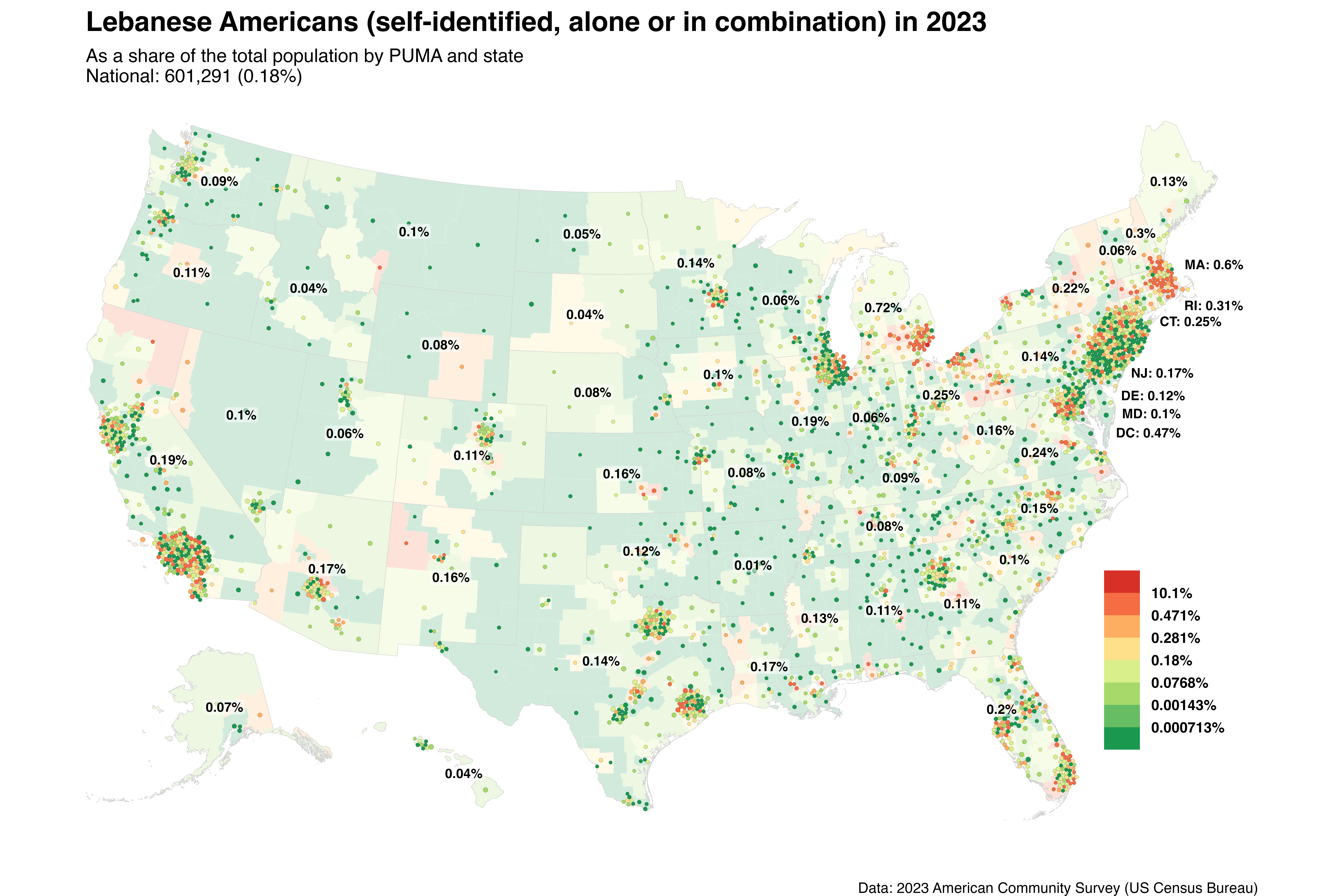

Total population
- Estimates vary. US Census estimates 685,672, while the Arab American Institute has stated that there are 1.4 million Lebanese Americans.

Regions with significant populations
- Michigan (Dearborn), California, New York, Florida, Ohio, Massachusetts, Texas, Oklahoma, Louisiana, Illinois, Pennsylvania, Arizona, New Jersey

Languages
- American English, Lebanese Arabic, French, Spanish

Religion
- Majority: Christianity (Maronite Catholic, Orthodox, Melkite Catholic, Protestantism); Minorities: Shias, Sunni Muslims, and Druze.

Related ethnic groups
- Other Lebanese people · Syrian Americans · Palestinian Americans · Middle Eastern Americans ·

Lebanese Americans (Arabic: أميركيون لبنانيون, romanized: Amrīkiyyūn Lubnāniyyūn) are Americans of Lebanese descent. This includes both native-born Americans and immigrants from Lebanon.

Lebanese Americans comprise 0.79% of the American population, as of the American Community Survey estimations for year 2007, and 32.4% of all Americans who originate from the Middle East. Lebanese Americans have had significant participation in American politics and involvement in both social and political activism. The diversity within the region sprouted from the diaspora of the surrounding countries. There are more Lebanese outside Lebanon today than within.

== History ==
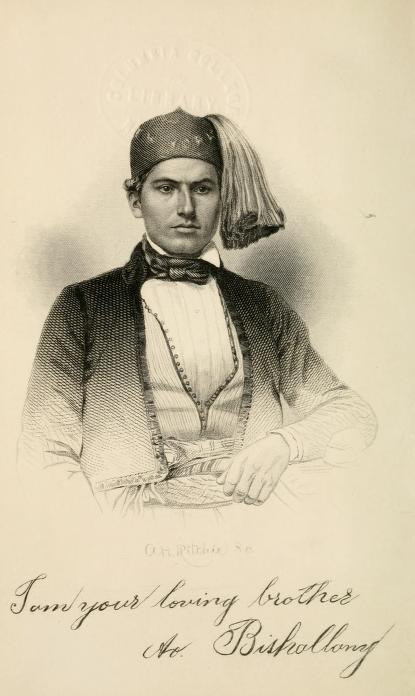
Sketch of Antonio Bishallany

The first known Lebanese immigrant to the United States was Antonio Bishallany, a Maronite Christian, who arrived in Boston Harbor in 1854. He died in Brooklyn, New York in 1856 on his 29th birthday. Large scale-Lebanese immigration began in the late 19th century. These newcomers settled mainly in Brooklyn and Boston, Massachusetts. They were identified as Syrians and almost all were Christians. Upon arrival in America, many worked as peddlers. The first wave of immigration continued until the 1920s.

Many of the Lebanese immigrants settled in northern New Jersey, in towns such as Bloomfield, Paterson, Newark, and Orange. Some set out west, settling in Detroit, Cleveland, Toledo, and Peoria. Others bought farms in Texas, South Dakota, and Iowa. Many traveled via the United Kingdom, including a large number on the ill-fated liner RMS Titanic.

The second wave of Lebanese immigration began in the late 1940s and continued through the early 1990s, when Lebanese citizens began to seek refuge from the Lebanese Civil War. Between 1948 and 1990, over 60,000 Lebanese entered the United States. Since then, the figures have risen to an estimated 5,000 immigrants a year. Those arriving in recent years are predominantly Muslim, although a majority of the Lebanese in America are Christian.

== Religion ==
Most of the Lebanese immigrants during the first and the early part of the second waves were Christians, with an increase in Muslims beginning in the late 1960s. These include Lebanese Shia Muslims and Lebanese Sunni Muslims. A number of Jews also fled Lebanon for the United States due to fears of persecution. Much of this data comes from the Arab American Institute and the United States census team.

The United States is the second largest home of Druze communities outside the Middle East after Venezuela (60,000). According to some estimates there are about 30,000 to 50,000 Druzes in the United States, with the largest concentration in Southern California. Most hail from Lebanon and Syria.

== Demographics ==
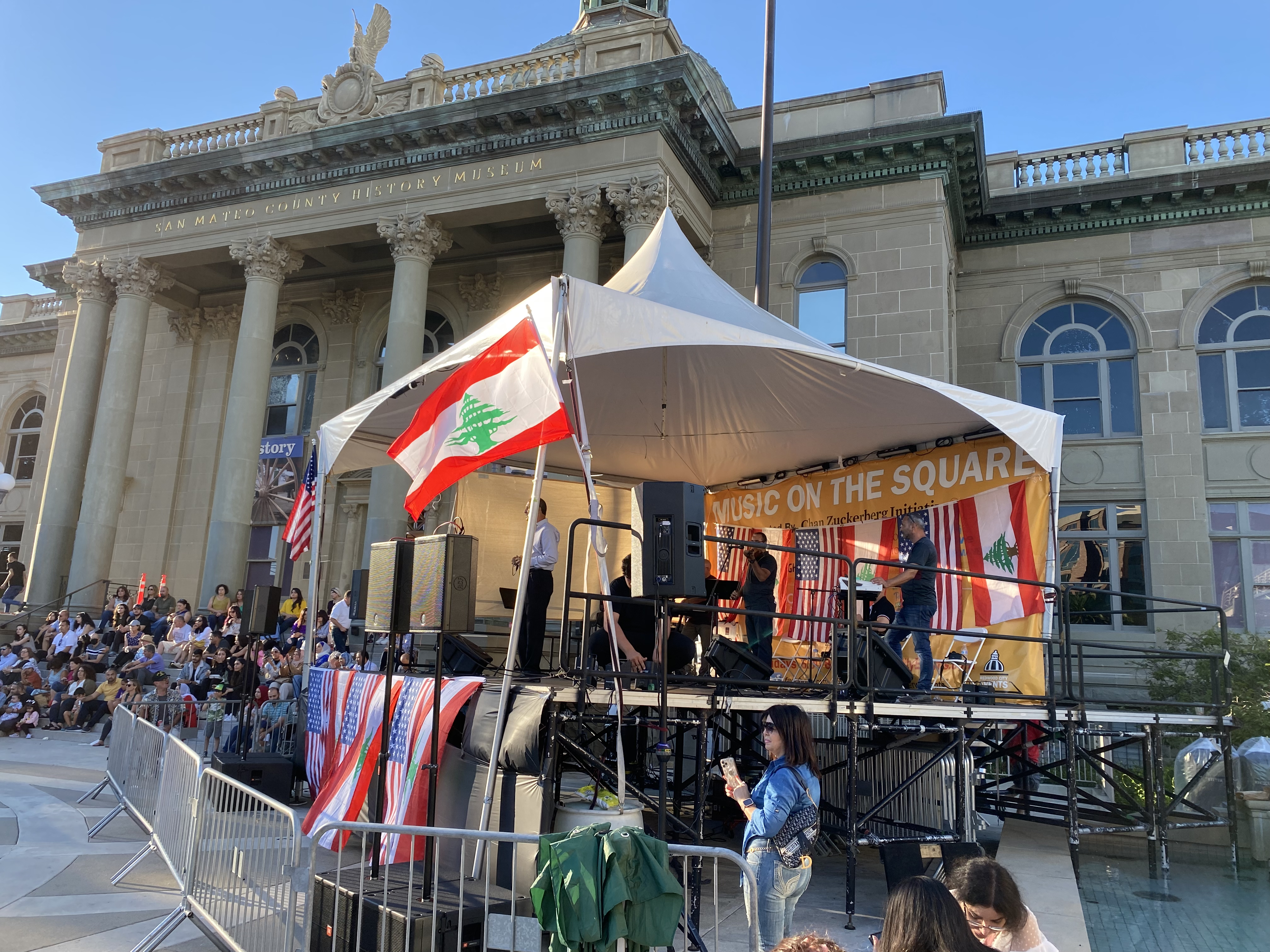
2022 Bay Area Lebanese Festival in Redwood City, California

Dearborn, Michigan has the highest concentration of Arab Americans in the United States, at over 40%. The rest of Metro Detroit has an even larger population of Lebanese residents. Brooklyn, New York has one of the oldest Lebanese populations in America, dating over 125 years; one large center is in the Bay Ridge section. Once predominantly Christian, the Lebanese in Bay Ridge are today equally split between Muslims and Christians. South Paterson, New Jersey historically had a large Lebanese Christian population dating back to the 1890s, but only a few remain, and the neighborhood has largely been replaced by Palestinian immigrants. Brooklyn holds a significant Lebanese community, with a Maronite Cathedral the center of one of two eparchies for Maronite Lebanese in the United States, the other being in Los Angeles. Lebanese Americans are categorized as White for census purposes.

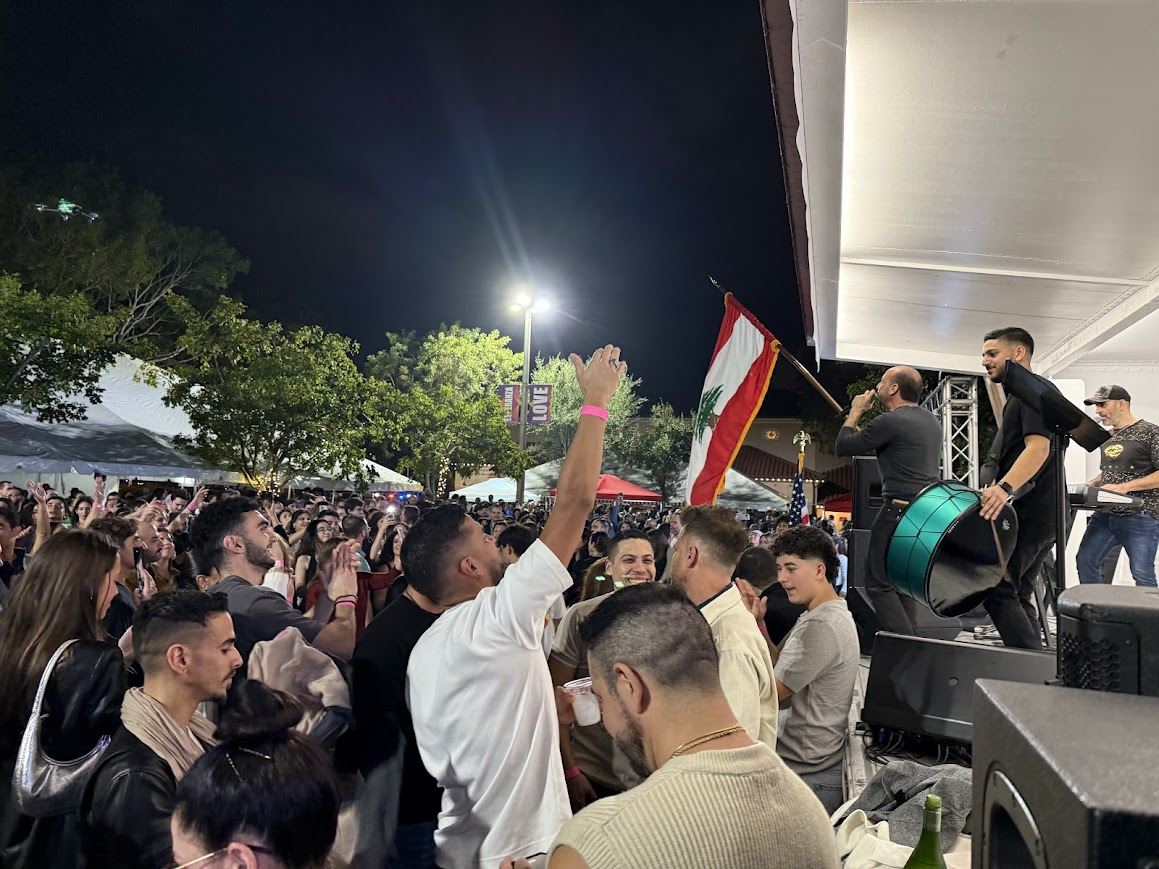
2024 Miami Lebanese Festival

The Arab American Institute reports the top five states where Lebanese Americans reside are: Michigan (11%), California (9%), Ohio (6%), Florida (6%), and Massachusetts (5%).

As the oldest and most well-established immigrant community among Arab Americans, Lebanese Americans represent a sizable majority of Middle Eastern Americans, counting at roughly 35% of all Middle Eastern Americans in the 2020 census. Despite this, the rapid growth of other Arab communities has displaced them as the largest Middle Easterner community in most urban areas (with notable exceptions such as Phoenix, Miami, and Detroit), and they now represent the majority of (and sometimes the only) Arab communities in most of rural and suburban America instead, also making them the least dense Arab community in the United States.

== Notable people ==
- Ralph Nader - lawyer and political activist, born in the USA.
- Jacques Nasser - former CEO of Ford Motor Company, moved to the USA in 1973.
- John Baldacci - former Democratic governor of Maine, born in the USA
- Spencer Abraham - former senator for Michigan, born in the USA

== See also ==
- List of Lebanese Americans
- Lebanon–United States relations
