= Nesreen Ghaddar =

Nesreen Ghaddar is a professor of mechanical engineering at the American University of Beirut. She is Qatar Chair of Energy Studies and the Director of the Munib, and Angela Institute of Energy and Natural Resources at AUB. She obtained her Bachelor in Engineering in 1980 and her Master in 1982 from Kuwait University and her PhD in 1985 from Massachusetts Institute of Technology.

She is an editor of the Journal of Applied Mechanics and a fellow of Islamic World Academy of Sciences.
