= Unitranche debt =

Unitranche debt is a form of flexible financing, typically used to fund mid-size buyouts and acquisitions. Unitranche financing is structured differently from other loan types since there is only one tranche, rather than more traditional loans which may prioritize senior debt over subordinated debt.

== Overview ==
Unitranches are private and often tailored to specific borrowers, but they share many features in common. Unitranche facilities are typically covered under a single-loan agreement, and are typically used to finance acquisitions. Unitranche loans have only one set of documents between the borrower and the lenders, who enter an Agreement Among Lenders between themselves.

Security is achieved through these inter-lender agreements, and the borrower may not be aware of what agreements exist between the different lenders involved. Unitranche loans combine senior and junior or subordinate loans into one package, and therefore often include more capital than the borrower would be able to obtain under either loan type.

== History ==
From the mid 2010s to 2021, a growing number of large private debt fundraisers and credit funds have led to an increasing number of unitranche loans used to finance large scale acquisitions. The creation of larger private debt funds in 2015, including BlueBay’s €2.1 billion direct lending fund and ICG’s €3 billion senior lending fund, made larger private credit sources available for unitranche loans. In 2016, Ares Management led the first $1 billion unitranche loan to underwrite the acquisition of Qlik by Thoma Bravo. This precipitated a wave of unitranches over $1 billion over the next five years.

Due to the growth of unitranche financing, it has become more common for private equity firms to act as lenders for large corporations, in lieu of traditional banks. According to Bloomberg, the volume of unitranche financing was roughly $3 billion in 2016, and had increased to $21.6 billion in the first half of 2021.

Direct lending has become an increasingly common source of financing for mid-market deals, despite shrinkage during the COVID-19 pandemic. They may still be less popular in Europe than in the United States. A 2020 survey of the leading European private equity firms by ARCOS Capital found that 78% of firms preferred senior bank financing, compared to only 22% who preferred unitranche financing. Many European banks also began partnering with alternative lenders to provide PIK loans, which have been considered "unitranche killers".
