= Eva M. Mack =

American lawyer and editor for Women Lawyers' Journal

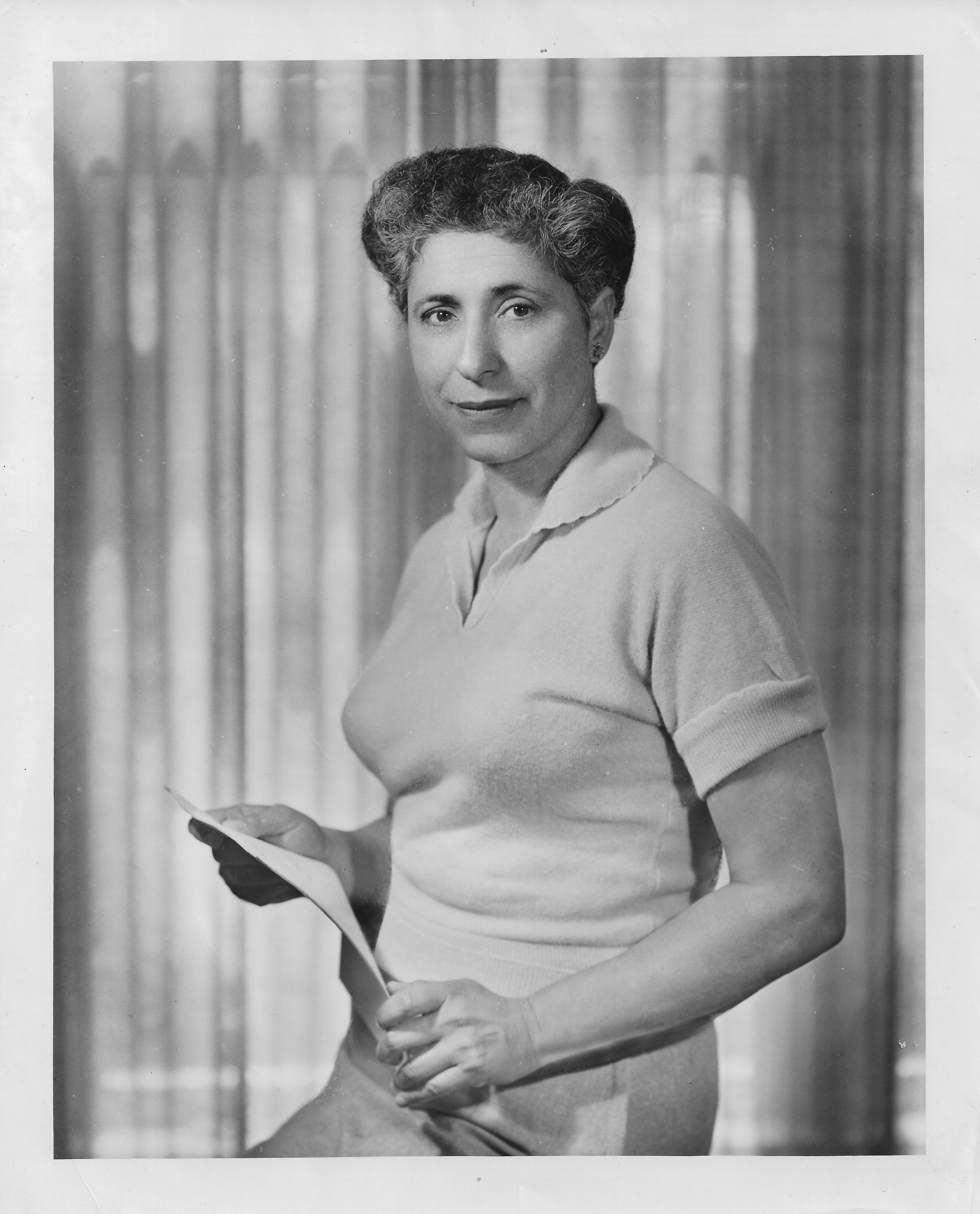
- Born: May 10, 1913
- Died: August 18, 1977 (aged 64)
- Occupations: Attorney, Editor, Educator
- Employers: Law firm of Hugh Ellwood Macbeth Sr.; Private law practice; Women Lawyers' Journal (1957-1958); Washington Adult School in Los Angeles
- Notable work: The Function of Women in Promoting International Relations
- Television: Divorce Court.; She was featured as an attorney in several episodes from 1957 to 1964)
- Spouse: Dr. Siegfried Ringwald
- Children: 3

Eva M. Mack (May 10, 1913 – August 18, 1977), also known as Eva Mack and Eva Mack Ringwald, was an American lawyer based in Los Angeles, California who joined the law firm of Hugh Ellwood Macbeth Sr., in the 1940s before opening her own law office in 1956.

Mack was born in Rhode Island and relocated with her family to California during the 1920s. She was mentored by her English teacher Ava Carr at Fremont High School in Los Angeles and encouraged to be independent and study law. She was one of six women in 1938 to be admitted into the California State Bar.

== Career ==
Harvard educated Hugh Ellwood Macbeth Sr. had one of the only law firms in Los Angeles during the 1940s that would include women lawyers in his firm. Chiyoko Sakamoto, the first Japanese American woman attorney, also became an associate.

Mack worked as co-counsel with Macbeth Sr. on the California Supreme Court case Davis v. Carter (1948), defending jazz musician Benny Carter against a racial housing covenant case brought by Edythe Davis. Benny Carter, who had been successful in composing and arranging music for Hollywood films, purchased a property in violation of restrictions on the deed that prevented those who were not of the Caucasian race from owning property.

When the case went on appeal to the California Supreme Court, Macbeth Sr. selected Eve Mack to represent Carter in Sacramento. The arguments to support Carter, carefully researched by Mack and Macbeth Sr. also included Mack's compassionate plea to the court to honor the equality of all human beings (Brilliant, pg. 100).

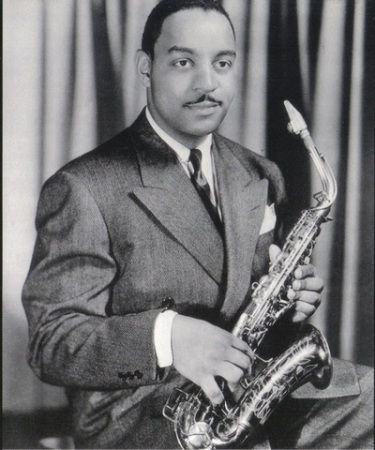
Benny Carter (1943). Eva M. Mack represented the musician and composer and prevailed on May 18, 1948 in the California Supreme Court in the landmark civil rights case Davis vs. Carter.

Ultimately, citing the U.S. Supreme Court cases Shelley v. Kraemer (1948) and Hurd v. Hodge (1948) as authorities, the higher court in California also ruled that “the judgment in the trial court refusing to enforce the restrictions is in each case affirmed”. Thus the deed that restricted Benny Carter from purchasing a property could not be enforced.

The 1957 film No Down Payment, based on the novel by John McPartland, touched on some of the discriminatory racial covenant issues referenced in Davis v. Carter (1948) in a scene in the film where Asian buyers were discouraged from purchasing a home in the new housing tract by obsolete racial restrictions in the subdivision property deeds that were no longer enforceable. At an opening event for the film, Eva M. Mack was acknowledged for her work on the landmark civil rights case.

After WWII, Mack worked with Macbeth Sr. for a court order to restore property that had been confiscated from Japanese Americans during their internment during the war. Sakamoto joined the firm after being released from an internment camp and became Eva Mack's close associate, colleague, and friend.

Mack was also involved in other California appellate court cases with Hugh E. Macbeth Sr. and stayed with the firm until his death in 1956.

In the mid-1950s, it was still difficult for a woman to be hired as a lawyer in a Los Angeles law firm when women attorneys were only allowed to serve as secretaries. Mack overcame the obstacle by building her own office in South Central Los Angeles at 8200 S. Broadway and developing clientele by teaching 'Business and Family Law' in the evening at Washington Adult School. Her classes were so successful that the Principal, Roy Stone moved the class to the auditorium to accommodate the over one hundred students that enrolled.

Eva Mack was also an advocate for women's rights and focused her independent law practice on domestic relations, business law and estates.

Women Lawyers Journal. Eva M. Mack was the editor from 1957-1958.

She was the editor for Women Lawyers' Journal from 1957-1958 and was a speaker at the International Conference of Lawyers in London, England in 1958 under the auspices of the American Bar Association. In 1959, she was among the female attorneys on a panel moderated by Judge S. Thomas Bucciarelli discussing court probate procedures.

Mack's appearances as an attorney on the reality television series Divorce Court from 1957 to 1964 contributed to a greater public acceptance of women attorneys.

She was a listed participant in the publications Foreign Aspects of U.S. National Security Conference Report and Proceedings (1958) and National Leadership and Foreign Policy: A Case Study in the Mobilization of Public Support (1963).

She was married twice and raised a family at a time when many women attorneys remained single as spinsters, dedicated only to their careers. Her son from her first marriage, Les Spencer, was an Air Force officer and pilot. She had two daughters with her second husband, college President and attorney Dr. Siegfried Ringwald, each with careers in real estate, education and art.

== Editor for Women Lawyers' Journal ==
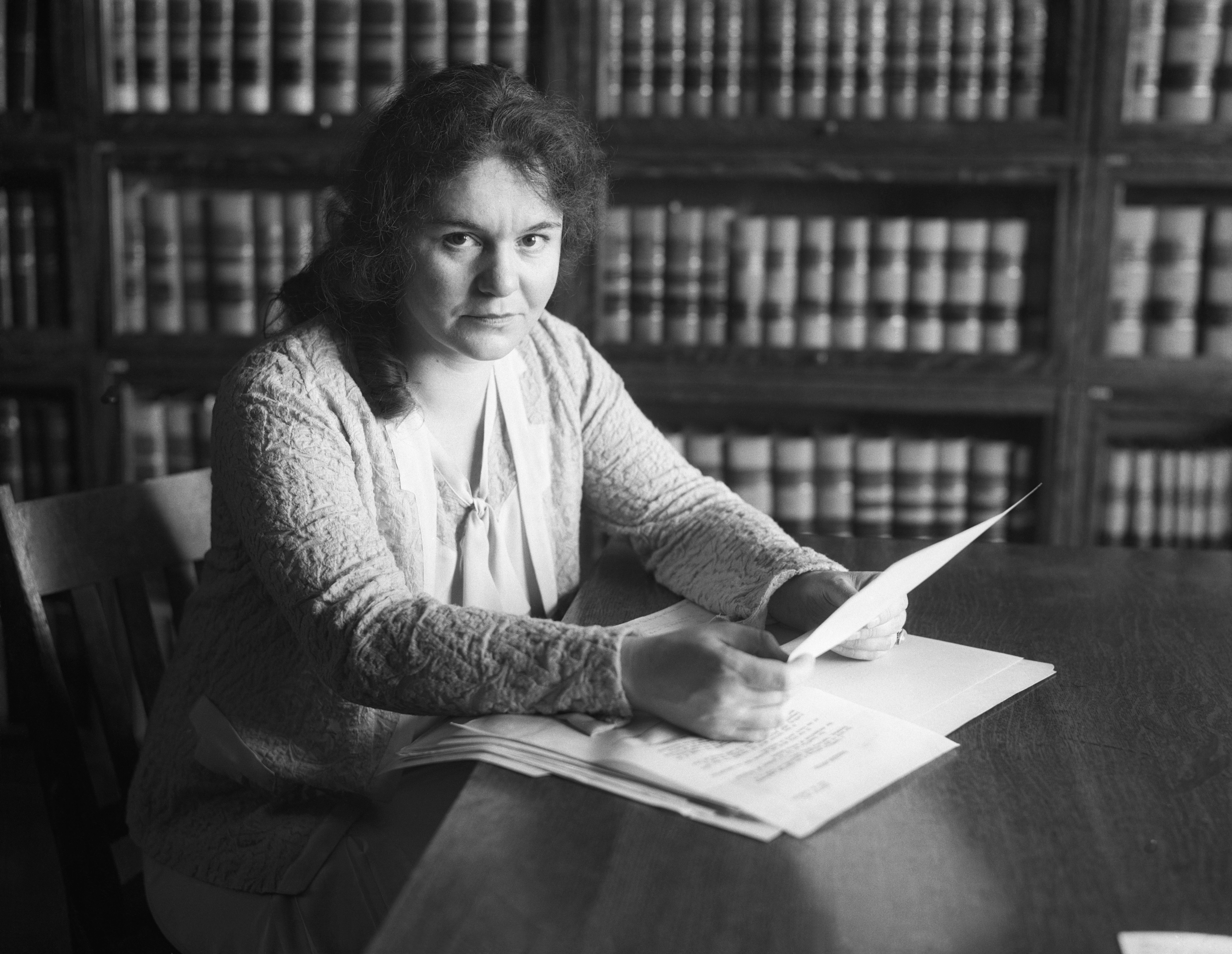
Rosalind Goodrich Bates (1931).

Mack was the editor for the Women Lawyers Journal (1957-1958) of the National Association of Women Lawyers (NAWL).

In that role, she collaborated with Rosalind Goodrich Bates, the founder of the International Federation of Women Lawyers (IAFL), on the coverage of 1957 NAWL/ American Bar Association (ABA) historic New York City/London Convention for the October issue of Women Lawyers' Journal.
