= List of Iranian Americans =

This is a list of notable Iranian-Americans of all Iranian ethnic backgrounds, including both original immigrants who obtained American citizenship and their American descendants.

To be included in this list, the person must have a Wikipedia article showing they are Iranian-American or must have references showing they are Iranian American.

== Academia and science ==
- Behnaam Aazhang, J.S. Abercrombie Professor in Electrical and Computer Engineering at Rice University
- Kamyar Abdi, archaeologist, former assistant professor in the Department of Anthropology, Dartmouth College
- Alexander Abian, mathematician, Iowa State University
- Mohammad Javad Abdolmohammadi, John E. Rhodes Professor of Accounting at Bentley University since 1988.
- Mahyar Amouzegar, President of New Mexico Tech, author
- Ervand Abrahamian, historian of Middle Eastern (particularly Iranian) history at City University of New York
- Janet Afary, author, feminist activist, and professor of Religious Studies at the University of California, Santa Barbara.
- Gholam Reza Afkhami, senior scholar and director of Social Science Research and International Studies at the Foundation for Iranian Studies
- Iraj Ershaghi, petroleum engineer; professor of Petroleum Engineering at the University of Southern California
- Shahriar Afshar, physicist and inventor who is the namesake of the Afshar experiment
- Ehsan Afshari, professor of electrical engineering and computer science at the University of Michigan, co-founder of LassenPeak and AirVine.
- Newsha Ajami, hydrologist specializing in urban water policy and sustainable water management; professor and director of urban water policy program at Stanford University
- Abass Alavi, professor of radiology, nuclear medicine and neurology at the University of Pennsylvania
- Leonardo Alishan, professor of Persian and comparative literature at the University of Utah (1978–1997)
- Abbas Alizadeh, archeologist of ancient Iran; former Senior Research Associate and director of the Iranian Prehistoric Project at the University of Chicago
- Abbas Amanat, William Graham Sumner Professor of History & International Studies at Yale University and director of Yale Program In Iranian Studies.
- Amir Amini, Professor of Electrical and Computer Engineering and Endowed Chair in Bioimaging at University of Louisville.
- Hooshang Amirahmadi, academic and political analyst. Professor of the Edward J. Bloustein School of Planning and Public Policy at Rutgers University
- Nahid Angha, Sufi scholar, Co-director and co-founder of the International Association of Sufism (IAS), founder of the International Sufi Women Organization, and executive editor of the journal Sufism: An Inquiry
- Anousheh Ansari, first Iranian in space and the first female space tourist;
- Nima Arkani-Hamed, theoretical physicist and professor at the Institute for Advanced Study in Princeton, New Jersey
- Abbas Ardehali, surgical director of UCLA's Heart and Lung Transplant program
- Saïd Amir Arjomand, professor of sociology at Stony Brook University, and director of the Stony Brook Institute of Global Studies. Founding editor of the Journal of Persianate Studies
- Yahya Armajani, professor of history and soccer coach at Macalester College
- Reza Aslan, scholar of religious studies, television host, and author of No God but God: The Origins, Evolution, and Future of Islam and Zealot: The Life and Times of Jesus of Nazareth. Currently a professor of creative writing at University of California, Riverside. Board member of the National Iranian American Council (NIAC)
- Abolhassan Astaneh-Asl, structural engineer and professor at University of California, Berkeley; investigated the collapse of the World Trade Center towers due to the September 11 attacks
- Fakhreddin Azimi, professor of history at the University of Connecticut
- Elham Azizi, associate professor of biomedical engineering and cancer data research at Columbia University
- Babak Azizzadeh, facial plastic and reconstructive surgeon, Keck School of Medicine of USC
- Sussan Babaie, art historian and curator, specialist in Persian art and Islamic art of the early modern period.especially the Safavid dynasty
- Shaul Bakhash, historian, expert in Iranian studies, George Mason University, Clarence J. Robinson Professor of History
- Laleh Bakhtiar, author and translator of 25 books about Islam, many of which deal with Sufism. She was best known for her 2007 translation of the Qur'an, known as The Sublime Quran,
- Mehrsa Baradaran, law professor specializing in banking law at University of Georgia
- Iraj Bashiri, professor of history at the University of Minnesota specialist in the fields of Central Asian studies and Iranian studies
- Asef Bayat, professor of sociology and Middle Eastern studies at the University of Illinois at Urbana–Champaign
- Manuel Berberian, earth scientist, specializing in earthquake seismology, geophysics, archaeoseismology, and environmental geoscience
- Mina Bissell, scientist and biologist known for research on breast cancer; former head of life science at the Lawrence Berkeley National Laboratory
- George Bournoutian, historian, professor of History at Iona College, and author of over 30 books on the history of Armenia, Iran, and the Caucasus
- Jennifer Tour Chayes, mathematical physicist & theoretical computer scientist, and world renowned leading expert on the modeling & analysis of dynamically growing graphs. Founder, Technical Fellow, & Managing Director of Microsoft Research New England & Microsoft Research New York
- Houchang Chehabi, historian, expert in Iranian studies at the Frederick S. Pardee School of Global Studies, Boston University, where he is professor of international relations and history
- Aaron Cohen-Gadol, internationally renowned neurosurgeon specializing in surgical treatment of brain tumors and aneurysms
- Hamid Dabashi, professor of Iranian studies and comparative literature at Columbia University in New York City
- Richard Danielpour, professor of composition, Manhattan School of Music
- Touraj Daryaee, Iranologist and historian at the University of California, Irvine
- Armen Der Kiureghian, professor of civil engineering at University of California, Berkeley, member of U.S. National Academy of Engineering, current president of the American University of Armenia
- Azita Emami, Andrew and Peggy Cherng Professor of Electrical Engineering and Medical Engineering at Caltech; Executive Officer of the Department of Electrical Engineering at Caltech
- Nader Engheta, H. Nedwill Ramsey Professor of Electrical and Systems Engineering at the University of Pennsylvania. He has made pioneering contributions to the fields of metamaterials, transformation and plasmonic optics, nano- and graphene photonics, nano- and miniature antennas, and bio-inspired optical imaging, among many others
- Dara Entekhabi, Bacardi and Stockholm Water Foundations Professor in the Department of Civil & Environmental Engineering and the Department of Earth, Atmospheric & Planetary Sciences at MIT. His main expertise is in the field of hydrology.
- Haleh Esfandiari, Middle East scholar and former director of the Middle East Program at the Woodrow Wilson International Center for Scholars. She is an expert on contemporary Iranian intellectual currents and politics, as well as women's issues and democratic developments in the Middle East. She was one of the four Iranian-Americans falsely convicted and detained by the Iranian government in May 2007.
- Fariba Fahroo, mathematician, program manager at the Air Force Office of Scientific Research. Along with I. M. Ross, she has published papers in pseudospectral optimal control theory. The Ross–Fahroo lemma and the Ross–Fahroo pseudospectral method are named after her
- Fereydoon Family, physicist in the field of nanotechnology and solid-state physics. He is the Samuel Candler Dobbs Professor of Physics at Emory University
- Allah Verdi Mirza Farman Farmaian, professor and head of Biology department at Rutgers University
- Sattareh Farmanfarmaian, founder and director of the Tehran School of Social Work. Co-founder of the Family Planning Association of Iran, and former vice-president of the International Planned Parenthood Federation
- Alimorad Farshchian, medical doctor, medical author, and founder and director of The Center of Regenerative Medicine in Miami, Florida
- Nariman Farvardin, president of Stevens Institute of Technology, and former provost of University of Maryland
- Bobak Ferdowsi, systems engineer at NASA's Jet Propulsion Laboratory; served on the Cassini–Huygens and Mars Science Laboratory Curiosity mission.
- Alexander L. George (born Alexander L. Givargis), behavioral scientist specialist in the psychological effects of nuclear crisis management, Graham H. Stuart Professor of Political Science Emeritus at Stanford University
- Mohammadreza Ghadiri, chemist and professor of chemistry at The Scripps Research Institute. Awarded the Feynman Prize in Nanotechnology in 1998
- S. Nassir Ghaemi, professor of psychiatry at Tufts University School of Medicine
- Roozbeh Ghaffari, inventor, bioelectronics entrepreneur, biomedical engineering research faculty at Northwestern University
- Kambiz GhaneaBassiri, professor of religion at Reed College, and author of A History of Islam in America and Competing Visions of Islam in the United States.
- M.R. Ghanoonparvar, professor emeritus of Persian and comparative literature at the faculty of Middle Eastern studies at the University of Texas, Austin
- Morteza Gharib, Hans W. Liepmann Professor of Aeronautics and Bio-Inspired Engineering at Caltech.
- Jamshid Gharajedaghi, organizational theorist, management consultant, & adjunct professor of Systems thinking at Villanova University.
- John Ghazvinian, author, historian and former journalist. Associate Director of the Middle East Center at the University of Pennsylvania.
- Doreen Granpeesheh, clinical psychologist, producer of the documentary Recovered: Journeys Through the Autism Spectrum and Back.
- Vartan Gregorian, president of The Carnegie Corporation of New York and former president of Brown University
- Mohammad Hajiaghayi, computer scientist known for his work in algorithms, game theory, network design, and big data. Jack and Rita G. Minker professor at the University of Maryland Dept. of Computer Science.
- Ali Hajimiri, inventor, technologist, and Thomas G. Myers Professor of Electrical Engineering at Caltech. Fellow of the National Academy of Inventors (NAI)
- Reza Hamzaee, economist and BOG-Distinguished Professor of Economics at Missouri Western State University. Specialist in banking and managerial economics
- Babak Hassibi, electrical engineer, the inaugural Mose and Lillian S. Bohn Professor of Electrical Engineering. Specialist in communications, signal processing and control.
- Payam Heydari, Professor of Electrical Engineering and Computer Science, University of California, Irvine
- Shireen Hunter, Research Professor at the Center for Muslim-Christian Understanding at Georgetown University.
- Ali Jadbabaie, systems theorist, network scientist, and the JR East Professor of Engineering at Massachusetts Institute of Technology
- Ali Jafari, professor of Computer and Information Technology at Purdue University, director of the CyberLab at Indiana University-Purdue University Indianapolis (IUPUI)
- Hamid Jafarkhani, leading communication theorist and chancellor's professor of electrical engineering and computer science at the University of California, Irvine
- Eiman Jahangir, cardiologist at Vanderbilt University; first Iranian male astronaut
- Farnam Jahanian, computer scientist and the 10th president of Carnegie Mellon University
- Ali Javan, physicist, inventor of gas laser; Professor Emeritus of Physics at MIT
- Hassan Jawahery, physicist, former spokesman of the BaBar Collaboration, and professor of physics at the University of Maryland
- Majd Kamalmaz, psychotherapist who has been illegally detained in Syria since 2017
- Sepandar Kamvar, computer scientist, Stanford University
- Mehran Kardar, physicist and professor of physics at MIT, and co-faculty at the New England Complex Systems Institute
- Morvarid Karimi, neurologist and medical researcher, specialist in neuroimaging of the pathophysiology of movement disorders. She was an assistant professor of Neurology in the Movement Disorders Section at Washington University School of Medicine in St. Louis, Missouri
- Ahmad Karimi-Hakkak, Iranist, scholar of modern Persian literature, and professor and founding director of the Roshan Center for Persian Studies at the University of Maryland
- Elham Kazemi, mathematics educator and educational psychologist; Geda and Phil Condit Professor in Math and Science Education in the College of Education of the University of Washington
- Firuz Kazemzadeh, historian of Russian and Iranian history, and professor emeritus of history at Yale University.
- Homayoon Kazerooni, roboticist & professor of mechanical engineering at the University of California, Berkeley; director of the Berkeley Robotics and Human Engineering Laboratory
- Fatemeh Keshavarz, scholar of Rumi and Farsi language & poetry, and poet in Persian and English; Director & Chair of Roshan Institute for Persian Studies at the University of Maryland. Previously, was a professor of Persian Language and Comparative Literature at Washington University in St. Louis
- Ali Khademhosseini, Levi Knight Endowed Professor at the University of California-Los Angeles. Holds a professorship in bioengineering, radiology, chemical, and biomolecular engineering.
- Laleh Khalili, professor of Middle Eastern Politics at the School of Oriental and African Studies at the University of London. She also writes regularly for Iranian.com
- Farid Khavari, economist, specialist in economics, environment, oil, healthcare, & the Middle East.
- Samira Kiani, Health Systems Engineer at Arizona State University. Her work combines CRISPR technology with synthetic biology. A 2019 AAAS Leshner Fellow.
- Alexander Kostellow, teacher, industrial designer, who developed the industrial design academic programs of Carnegie Institute of Technology and Pratt Institute
- Farinaz Koushanfar, professor and Henry Booker Faculty Scholar of Electrical and Computer Engineering at the University of California, San Diego
- Habib Levy, historian, specialist in the history of Jews in Iran; author of Comprehensive History of the Jews of Iran: The Outset of the Diaspora.
- Esfandiar Maasoumi, econometrician and economist. Distinguished Professor at Emory University and a fellow of the Royal Statistical Society
- Ladan Eshkevari, PhD, CRNA, L.Ac., healthcare professional and academic. Co-CEO and Founder of Avesta Ketamine and Wellness
- Mohammad Jafar Mahjoub, prominent Iranian scholar of Persian literature, essayist, translator, and professor. Moved to the U.S. in 1991 and taught at the University of California, Berkeley
- G. A. Mansoori, professor of chemical engineering at University of Illinois at Chicago
- Bahram Mashhoon, general relativity physicist and professor of physics at the University of Missouri. Through his research works, he has given important contributions to general relativity, particularly to the gravitomagnetic clock effect. He is also active in the field of non-local gravity
- Rashid Massumi, cardiologist and clinical professor, best known for his pioneering research in the field of electrophysiology. He was also known for bringing modern cardiology to Iran, and for being the cardiologist to the last Shah of Iran and, until 1980, Ayatollah Khomeini
- Noah McKay (born Nasser Talebzadeh Ordoubadi), physician and author of Wellness at Warp Speed
- Robert Mehrabian, material scientist, former president of Carnegie Mellon University, and Chair, President, and CEO of Teledyne Technologies
- Houra Merrikh, microbiologist and a full professor at Vanderbilt University
- Abbas Milani, director of Iranian Studies Program at Stanford University; research fellow & co-director of the "Iran Democracy Project" at Stanford's Hoover Institution
- Farzaneh Milani, professor of Persian Literature and Women's Studies at the University of Virginia, and the Chair of the Department of Middle Eastern and South Asian Languages & Cultures.
- Mohsen Milani, foreign policy analyst, Director of the Center for Strategic and Diplomatic Studies and professor of politics at the University of South Florida
- Abbas Mirakhor, economist; former executive director and dean of board of the International Monetary Fund (INF); distinguished scholar and chair in Islamic finance at Malaysia's INCEIF (International Centre for Education in Islamic Finance)
- Maryam Mirzakhani, Stanford University Professor; first female winner of the Fields Medal
- Bita Moghaddam, Neuroscientist, author of KETAMINE and 150 scientific papers, Professor of Behavioral Neuroscience at Oregon Health and Science University
- Mahta Moghaddam, Inventor, Professor of electrical engineering University of Southern California
- Afshin Molavi, author and expert on global geo-political risk and geo-economics, particularly the Middle East and Asia.
- Jasmin Moghbeli, NASA astronaut candidate of the class of 2017
- Mehryar Mohri, professor of computer science at the Courant Institute of Mathematical Sciences at New York University. Specialist in machine learning, automata theory and algorithms, speech recognition and natural language processing
- Parviz Moin, fluid dynamicist, professor of mechanical engineering at Stanford University. 2011 inductee to the United States National Academy of Sciences
- Mohsen Mostafavi, architect and educator, Dean and Alexander and Victoria Wiley Professor at the Harvard Graduate School of Design
- Farzad Mostashari, internal medicine physician, former national coordinator for health information technology at U.S. Department of Health and Human Services
- Hossein Khan Motamed, surgeon, founder of the Motamed Hospital in Tehran, Iran, and personal physician of Mohammad Reza Shah.
- Negar Mottahedeh, cultural critic and film theorist
- Roy Mottahedeh, Gurney Professor of History, Emeritus at Harvard University, specialist in pre-modern social and intellectual history of the Islamic Middle East. Former director of Harvard's Center for Middle Eastern Studies (1987–1990), and inaugural director of Harvard's Prince Alwaleed Bin Talal Islamic Studies Program (2005–2011)
- Hamid Mowlana, professor emeritus of international relations and founding director of the Division of International Communication at the School of International Service at American University. In 2003, he was honored as an "Chehrehaye Mandegar" (Eternal One) by Iranian universities and academies.
- Eden Naby, Iranian-Assyrian cultural historian of Central Asia and the Middle East, who is notable for her publications, research, and preservation work on Assyrian culture and history
- Firouz Naderi, former NASA director of Mars project. Has also served in other various technical and executive positions at NASA's Jet Propulsion Laboratory.
- Hamid Naficy, cholar of cultural studies of diaspora, exile, & postcolonial cinemas and media, and of Iranian & Middle Eastern cinemas. Hamad Bin Khalifa Al-Thani Professor in Communication at Northwestern University .
- Paul M. Naghdi, professor of mechanical engineering at the University of California, Berkeley. Specialist in continuum mechanics
- Majid M. Naini (مجید ناینی), Rumi scholar, computer scientist, former professor at University of Pennsylvania, writer on poetry, science, technology, and mysticism
- Kayvan Najarian, associate professor of computer science, Virginia Commonwealth University
- Seyyed Hossein Nasr, professor of Islamic studies at George Washington University; prominent Islamic philosopher
- Vali Reza Nasr, author and scholar on the Middle East and Islamic world; Served as Dean of the Johns Hopkins School of Advanced International Studies (SAIS) in Washington D.C.
- Angella Nazarian (née Angella Maddahi), former professor of psychology at Mount St. Mary's University, California State University, Long Beach & the Los Angeles Valley College. Co-founder of Looking Beyond
- Sharon Nazarian, founder of the Younes and Soraya Israel Studies Center at the University of California, Los Angeles
- Camran Nezhat, laparoscopic surgeon and director of Stanford Endoscopy Center for Training & Technology, Stanford University
- Kathy Niakan, human developmental and stem cell biologist. In 2016, she became the first scientist in the world to gain regulatory approval to edit the genomes of human embryos for research.
- Reza Olfati-Saber, roboticist and assistant professor of engineering at Dartmouth College
- Kaveh Pahlavan, professor of computer and electrical engineering, professor of computer science, and director of the Center for Wireless Information Network Studies (CWINS) at the Worcester Polytechnic Institute
- Firouz Partovi, physicist; founder and former chairman of the Faculty of Physics at the Sharif University of Technology. Has also taught at MIT and Harvard University.
- Massoud Pedram, computer engineer known for his research in green computing, power optimization (EDA), low power electronics and design, and electronic design automation.
- Gholam A. Peyman, ophthalmologist, retina surgeon, and inventor of LASIK eye surgery
- Nader Pourmand, professor of biomolecular engineering at the Baskin School of Engineering
- Ali R. Rabi, scholar at the Center for International Development and Conflict Management at University of Maryland, College Park; founding chair of the Middle Eastern Citizens Assembly; Initiated the International University of Iran in 2001.
- Samuel Rahbar, biomedical scientist, discovered the linkage between HbA1C and diabetes
- Hazhir Rahmandad, engineer and expert in dynamic modeling and system dynamics. Associate Professor in the System Dynamics group at the MIT Sloan School of Management.
- Yahya Rahmat-Samii, professor and the Northrop Grumman Chair in Electromagnetics at Electrical Engineering Department at UCLA
- Behzad Razavi, professor of electrical engineering and director of the Communications Circuit Laboratory at the University of California, Los Angeles. y
- Manijeh Razeghi, Walter P. Murphy Professor & Director of the Center for Quantum Devices at Northwestern University, pioneer in semiconductors and optoelectronic devices.
- Zabihollah Rezaee, accountant, Thompson-Hill Chair of Excellence and professor of accounting at the University of Memphis
- Sakineh (Simin) M. Redjali, psychologist and author; first female professor at the National University of Iran
- Darius Rejali, professor of political science at Reed College and scholar specialized in the study of torture; has served on the board of the Human Rights Review since 2000.
- Nouriel Roubini, economist; economics professor at the Stern School of Business, New York University
- Pardis Sabeti, computational geneticist, Assistant Professor, Center for Systems Biology and Department of Organismic and Evolutionary Biology, Harvard University
- Ahmad Sadri, sociologist and professor of sociology and anthropology at Lake Forest College, and the James P. Gorter Professor of Islamic World Studies since 2007. Active in the reform movement in Iran.
- Mahmoud Sadri, professor of sociology at the Federation of North Texas Area Universities. His major interests are in religious, cultural & theoretical sociology, reform Islam and interfaith dialogue.
- Omid Safi, professor of Asian and Middle Eastern studies at Duke University, director of the Duke Islamic Studies Center, and columnist for On Being. Scholar of Islamic mysticism (Sufism)
- Mehran Sahami, professor and the Associate Chair for Education in the Computer Science department at Stanford University. Robert and Ruth Halperin University Fellow in Undergraduate Education at Stanford.
- Muhammad Sahimi, Professor of Chemical Engineering and Materials Science and current NIOC chair in petroleum engineering at USC
- Djavad Salehi-Isfahani, professor of Economics at Virginia Tech, and visiting fellow at the Middle East Youth Initiative at the Wolfensohn Center for Development at the Brookings Institution. His expertise is on demographic & energy economics and the economics of Iran & the larger Middle East
- David B. Samadi, vice chairman of the Department of Urology and Chief of Robotics and Minimally Invasive Surgery at the Icahn School of Medicine at Mount Sinai
- Eliz Sanasarian, professor of political science at the University of Southern California. Specialist ethnic politics and feminism, particularly regarding the Middle East and Iran
- Kamal Sarabandi, professor of Engineering at the University of Michigan
- Homayoun Seraji, Senior Research Scientist at NASA's Jet Propulsion Laboratory and Caltech, former professor at Sharif University of Technology. Works in the field of robotics and space exploration.
- Cyrus Shahabi, chair of the Computer Science Department, University of Southern California
- Mohammad Shahidehpour, Carl Bodine Distinguished Professor and chairman in the Electrical and Computer Engineering Department at Illinois Institute of Technology
- Ghavam Shahidi, electrical engineer and IBM Fellow, Director of Silicon Technology at IBM's Watson's Laboratory
- Alireza Shapour Shahbazi, lecturer in Achaemenid archeology and Iranology at Harvard University, full professor of history in Eastern Oregon University
- Manuchehr Shahrokhi, professor of Global Business-Finance at California State University; Founding Editor of Global Finance Journal; Executive Director of Global Finance Association
- Fatemeh Shams, contemporary Persian poet, and assistant professor of Persian literature at the University of Pennsylvania
- Shahrokh Shariat, urologist; professor & chairman of the Department of Urology of the Medical University of Vienna, Vienna, Austria; adjunct professor of urology & medical oncology at Weill Cornell Medical Center & at the University of Texas Southwestern Medical Center.
- Nasser Sharify, distinguished professor and dean emeritus of the School of Information and Library Science at Pratt Institute
- M. Rahim Shayegan, Professor of Iranian at UCLA
- Siamack A. Shirazi, scientist, professor and graduate coordinator of the Mechanical Engineering department at the University of Tulsa.
- Hamid Shirvani, Distinguished University Professor Emeritus of architecture and Urban Design, Internationally renowned scholar, former president of California State University, former chancellor of North Dakota University System
- Rahmat Shoureshi, former president of Portland State University; former president, Provost & professor at New York Institute of Technology
- Sam Sofer, scientist who specializes in biological processes and bioreactor design
- Saba Soomekh, professor of religious studies, women's studies, and Middle Eastern history at UCLA and Loyola Marymount University. Author of books and articles on contemporary and historical Iranian Jewish culture
- Shahrbanou Tadjbakhsh, university lecturer at Sciences Po, researcher, and United Nations consultant in peacekeeping, conflict resolution, counter-terrorism and radicalization. Best known for her work in "Human Security"
- Kian Tajbakhsh, social scientist, urban planner, and professor of urban planning at Columbia University. One of the four Iranian-Americans falsely convicted and detained by the Iranian government in May 2007
- Ray Takeyh, Middle East scholar and Senior Fellow at the Council on Foreign Relations
- Kamran Talattof, Persian literature and Iranian culture; director of Persian Program University of Arizona
- Vahid Tarokh, professor of electrical and computer engineering, Bass Connections Professor, a professor of mathematics (secondary), and computer science (secondary) at Duke University
- Nader Tehrani, designer, Dean of the Irwin S. Chanin School of Architecture at Cooper Union, and former professor of architecture and department chair at the MIT School of Architecture and Planning.
- Cumrun Vafa, string theorist and Donner Professor of Science at Harvard University. Recipient of the 2008 Dirac Medal and the 2016 Breakthrough Prize in Fundamental Physics.
- Saba Valadkhan, biomedical scientist, assistant professor and RNA researcher at Case Western Reserve University, recipient of Young Scientist Award in 2005 for the mechanism of spliceosomes
- Roxanne Varzi, associate professor of anthropology and film and media studies at the University of California, Irvine, documentary filmmaker, and writer
- Ehsan Yarshater, founder and editor in chief of Encyclopaedia Iranica, first full-time professor at a U.S. university since World War II; Hagop Kevorkian Professor Emeritus of Iranian Studies; director of the Center for Iranian Studies, Columbia University;
- Hajar Yazdiha, assistant professor of sociology at the University of Southern California
- Mohammad Yeganeh, economist, former Governor of the Central Bank of Iran (1973–1975), a professor of economics at Columbia University (1980–1985)
- Houman Younessi, researcher and educator in informatics, computer science, and molecular biology. Former research professor at the University of Connecticut
- Lotfi A. Zadeh, mathematician, computer scientist, and a professor emeritus of computer science at the University of California, Berkeley; father of fuzzy logic and fuzzy sets
- Norm Zada, former adjunct mathematics professor, and founder of Perfect 10; son of Lotfi A. Zadeh
- Reza Zadeh, computer scientist at Stanford University
- Iraj Zandi, emeritus professor of systems, University of Pennsylvania
- Mark Zandi, chief economist of Moody's Analytics,
- Esmail Zanjani, department chair of Department of Animal Biotechnology at University of Nevada, Reno. President of the International Society for Experimental Hematology

== Arts and entertainment ==
- Omid Abtahi, actor
- Reza Abdoh, director and playwright known for large-scale, experimental theatrical productions
- Hessam Abrishami, artist whose works have been exhibited internationally
- Golnar Adili, multidisciplinary artist based in Brooklyn, New York. Much of her works are influenced by her childhood growing up in post-revolutionary Tehran and issues of displacement
- Desiree Akhavan, film director, producer, screenwriter and actress
- Ray Aghayan, fashion designer and costume designer for the American film industry
- Shohreh Aghdashloo, film and television actress; one of Iran's leading actresses prior to the 1979 revolution. known in the United States for her role in House of Sand and Fog (2003).
- Dan Ahdoot, stand-up comedian and actor
- Jonathan Ahdout, actor best known for his role in House of Sand and Fog (2003)
- Shiva Ahmadi, multidisciplinary artist whose works borrow from Persian artistic traditions to critically examine contemporary political tensions and social issues
- Mohammad Alavi, video-game developer, best known for his work on the Call of Duty series
- Khalik Allah, filmmaker, photographer, and author. (Iranian father.)
- Morehshin Allahyari, media artist, activist, and educator. Her work questions current political, socio-cultural, and gender norms while exploring the relationship between technology and art activism. Best known for her work Material Speculation: ISIS (2016), which is a series of 3D-printed sculptural reconstructions of ancient artifacts destroyed by ISIS
- Mark Amin, film producer, distributor, writer, and businessman. Founder of Trimark Pictures (formerly Vidmark Entertainment)
- Max Amini, standup comedian and actor
- Ana Lily Amirpour, film director, screenwriter, producer, and actor
- Mahyar Amouzegar, author
- Pegah Anvarian, fashion designer and creative director of Three Dots
- Ali Ardekani, also known as Baba Ali; game developer, film developer, and Islamic comedian
- Siah Armajani, architect and sculptor known for his public art
- Tala Ashe, actress
- Kami Asgar, supervising sound editor for films and television
- Aram Avakian, director, film editor
- Rasoul Azadani, animator, lighting designer, and layout artist. Best known for his work at Walt Disney Animation Studios.
- Shoja Azari, visual artist and filmmaker based in New York City. Best known for films such as Women Without Men (2009), Windows (2006), and K (2002)
- Ashurbanipal Babilla, actor, theatre director, playwright and visual artist
- Ramin Bahrani, film director and screenwriter, most notable for his film Chop Shop. Professor of film directing at Columbia University's Graduate Film Program
- Mercedes Bass, socialite and arts philanthropist. On the executive boards of the Carnegie Hall Corporation, the Metropolitan Opera in New York City, the Aspen School of Music and Aspen Institute in Aspen, Colorado, the Fort Worth Symphony Orchestra, and the American Academy in Rome
- Zal Batmanglij, film director and screenwriter. Creator and showrunner of the Netflix series The OA
- Ali Banisadr, artist
- Reza Badiyi, film and television director
- Catherine Bell, actress
- Le Roy Benjamin, sculptor, and marionette puppeteer and voice impersonator for the vaudeville and television act Le Roy Brothers Marionettes (1939–1955), one of the most celebrated and requested vaudeville acts in America at the time. Father is Iranian.
- Issa Benyamin, Iranian-Assyrian calligrapher and educator
- Bahram Beyzai, filmmaker, playwright, theater director, screenwriter, and Ostād (Grandmaster) of Persian letters, arts and Iranian studies. Considered the pioneer of the Iranian New Wave of cinema.
- Bijan, designer of menswear and fragrances. His exclusive boutique on Rodeo Drive in Beverly Hills has been described as "the most expensive store in the world"
- Nadia Bjorlin, TV and soap opera actress, singer, and model
- Buket, prominent Los Angeles graffiti artist
- Henri Charr, Iranian-Assyrian filmmaker
- Shaghayegh Cyrous, artist and curator based in San Francisco. Known for social practice art, video installations and street art.
- Dar Dash, actor, voice actor
- David Dastmalchian, film and theater actor, best known for his role as Kurt in the Marvel Cinematic Universe films Ant-Man (2015) and Ant-Man and the Wasp (2018)
- Sumbat Der Kiureghian, 20th century watercolor artist
- David Diaan, actor, screenwriter, producer, and entrepreneur
- Lucas and Marcus Dobre-Mofid, also known as The Dobre Twins. Dancing duo and YouTube personalities who rose to prominence on the now-defunct Vine video app
- Ala Ebtekar, contemporary visual artist
- Melody Ehsani, fashion designer
- Robert Ekhart, film actor, film director, and editor-in-chief of former Iran-based Setare Cinema magazine
- Nabil Elderkin, also known by Nabil; film and music video director and photographer, who has directed music videos for Kanye West, Frank Ocean, John Legend, and Foals
- Dayyan Eng, award-winning feature film writer, director, and producer.
- Eman Esfandi, actor
- Tanaz Eshaghian, documentary filmmaker
- Ali Farahnakian, actor, writer, and improv comedian. Founder of The Peoples Improv Theater (The Pit) in New York City and co-starred the Adult Swim comedy series Delocated
- Monir Shahroudy Farmanfarmaian, artist and collector of traditional folk art. The Monir Museum in Tehran was opened in her honor in 2017.
- Parisa Fakhri, actress and voice actress, most notable for her role as Arisa Uotani in Fruits Basket
- Behnaz Farahi, architect best known for her designs of interactive wearables and installations
- Negin Farsad, comedian, actress, filmmaker, and writer
- Hossein Fatemi, photojournalist
- Mimi Fayazi, fashion designer
- Reza Fazeli, actor, film director, and opposition figure against the government of the Islamic Republic of Iran
- Tatyana Fazlalizadeh, artist, activist, and freelance illustrator. She is best known for her poster campaign "Stop Telling Women to Smile,"
- JoJo Fletcher, contestant on the twentieth season of ABC's The Bachelor and as the lead on the twelfth season of The Bachelorette. Iranian mother.
- Hamid Gabbay, architect. Prior to the 1979 revolution, he was a prolific architect throughout Iran. Since his immigration to the United States, has worked in Beverly Hills, California
- Troy Gentile (born Troy Francis Farshi), actor, best known for his role as Mark in Hotel for Dogs and Barry Goldberg in the sitcom The Goldbergs
- Siamak Ghahremani, founder of Noor Iranian Film Festival, radio host
- Vida Ghahremani, actress, proprietor of Monde Cafe and Cuccini Dance Club in L.A. along with her husband, David Yeghiazarian.
- Tina Gharavi, BAFTA-nominated film/TV director and screenwriter
- Tehran Von Ghasri, best known by his stage name Tehran; standup comedian and actor
- Gabriel Guevrekian, architect of buildings, interiors and gardens. Taught architecture at the University of Illinois, Urbana-Champaign
- Nahid Hagigat, illustrator and painter
- Taraneh Hemami, visual artist and arts educator. Utilizes multidisciplinary projects to address complex cultural politics of the exile of the Iranian diaspora.
- Kambiz Hosseini, actor, political satirist, and television/radio host. Host of Poletik, a satirical news program that airs on Radio Farda. Created and hosted Parazit on Voice of America - Persian (2009–2012).
- Sheree Hovsepian, photographer and collage artist.
- Albert and Allen Hughes (twins), film directors and producers. Most notable for Menace II Society and The Book of Eli. Iranian mother
- Reza Beyk Imanverdi, actor and director popular during the 1960s and 1970s in Iran
- Pouran Jinchi, contemporary artist known for her abstract, calligraphy-based visual art
- Maz Jobrani, standup comedian and actor
- JonTron (Jonathan "Jon" Aryan Jafari), comedian, YouTuber, video game critic
- Joone, photographer, director, and producer of adult films
- Pirooz Kalayeh, film director, screenwriter, and writer
- Y.Z. Kami, artist, known for creating large-scaled oil-based paintings
- Martik Kanian, singer and songwriter
- Cyrus Kar, film director
- Bavand Karim, multi-media artist and filmmaker
- Reza Karimi, painter, whose oil-based paintings reflect the political turbulence of Iran, such as the trial of Mossadegh and the treatment of women in Iran
- Saman Kesh, filmmaker and music video director and producer. He is best known for his music videos for Calvin Harris, Ed Sheeran, Deus, Basement Jaxx, and !!!, among many others
- Maryam Keshavarz, filmmaker best known for her 2011 film Circumstance
- Mehran Khaghani, standup comedian, comedy director and comedy event producer based in Boston, Massachusetts
- Marco Khanlian, film and television actor, stunt performer
- Nahnatchka Khan, screenwriter and producer. Creator and showrunner of ABC's Fresh Off the Boat
- Kamran Khavarani, award-winning architect and painter. Pioneer of the "Abstract Romanticism" painting style;
- Kathreen Khavari, actress, writer, and producer
- Avish Khebrehzadeh, painter, installation artist, photographer
- Mohammad Khordadian, choreographer, dancer, and entertainer. Known for his dance instruction tapes of Persian and Arabic dance
- Kamshad Kooshan, screenwriter, film director, and film producer
- Sarah R. Lotfi, filmmaker, known for her World War II epic The Last Bogatyr (2009)
- Rosie Malek-Yonan, actress, author, director, public figure and activist
- Tala Madani, painter, known for her use of cartoonish and exaggerated sexual imageries
- Terrence Malick, film director, screenwriter, and producer. Notable for Badlands (1973), Days of Heaven (1978), The Thin Red Line (1998), and The Tree of Life (2011). He is of Iranian-Assyrian descent
- Arefeh Mansouri, inventor, designer
- Marshall Manesh, actor
- Mozhan Marnò, film and television actress, best known for her roles in The Blacklist and House of Cards
- Jamie Masada, comedian and businessman. Founder of the Laugh Factory, a chain of comedy clubs in several states.
- Mercedes Mason, actress
- Sanaz Mazinani, multidisciplinary visual artist, curator and educator, known for her photography and installation art
- Laleh Mehran, contemporary artist, and professor and graduate director of Emergent Digital Practices at the University of Denver
- Stacy Mehrfar, contemporary artist
- Peyman Moaadi, actor, screenwriter, director; best known for his role in A Separation (2011)
- Arian Moayed, actor, Emmy-nominated writer/director, art educator, and co-founder of Waterwell
- Emud Mokhberi, film director and animator. In 2009, he was nominated for an Academy Award for Best Animated Short Film for Oktapodi
- Amir Mokri, cinematographer, known for his works on Bad Boys II, Fast & Furious, Man of Steel, and The Joy Luck Club
- Soudabeh Moradian, award-winning independent filmmaker
- Neda Moridpour, feminist artist, educator, and co-founder of the artist-activist collectives LOUDER THAN WORDS and [P]Art Collective. Currently a professor of the Practice in the Media Arts department at the School of the Museum of Fine Arts at Tufts University
- Amir Naderi, film director, screenwriter, photographer. One of the major figures in Iranian cinema before and after the 1979 revolution. Best known for The Runner and Vegas: Based on a True Story. Immigrated to the U.S. in the 1990s.
- Arsi Nami actor, musician, singer-songwriter, music therapist, and philanthropist
- Navid Negahban, actor, appeared on Homeland and Mistresses. Also noted for his role as The Sultan in the live-action remake of Aladdin.
- Shirin Neshat, visual artist known for her work in film, video, and photography
- Ali Nejad, television personality and host
- Nicky Nodjoumi, fine-arts painter, whose works address Iranian politics, history, power, and corruption
- Zahra Noorbakhsh, comedian, writer, actor and co-host of the #GoodMuslimBadMuslim podcast
- Sareh Nouri, fashion designer known for couture wedding gowns and bridal sashes
- Cyrus Nowrasteh, screenwriter and director
- Younan Nowzaradan, surgeon specializing in vascular surgery and bariatric surgery. Known for helping morbidly obese patients lose weight on the TLC-reality TV show My 600-lb Life (2012–present)
- Bijan Olia, film composer and songwriter
- Zhubin Parang, improv comedian and writer for The Daily Show
- Eric Parnes, multidisciplinary contemporary artist based in New York City.
- Khosrow Parvizi, director
- Adrian Pasdar, actor and voice actor
- Artemis Pebdani, actress, best known for her roles on television
- Nasim Pedrad, comedian, actress, best known for her five seasons as a cast member on Saturday Night Live
- Vahik Pirhamzei, actor, producer, director, and writer. Best known for his film My Uncle Rafael
- Tala Raassi, fashion designer, known for her swimsuit line, Dar Be Dar
- Babak Rafei, video game art director, character animator and concept artist. Co-founder and CEO of Big Red Button Entertainment
- Sara Rahbar, contemporary artist based in New York City
- Medalion Rahimi, actress
- Hamid Rahmanian, New York–based Iranian multi-disciplinary artist working in cinema, graphic art, and shadow theater
- Dominic Rains (born Amin Nazemzadeh), actor, known for his portrayal in The Taqwacores (2010), A Girl Walks Home Alone at Night (2014), and his role as Kasius in Agents of S.H.I.E.L.D.
- Ethan Rains (born Iman Nazemzadeh), soap opera actor
- Shiva Rose, actress, activist, and blogger.
- Sabzi, artist known for his abstract impressionist paintings.
- Mehdi Saeedi, artist and graphic designer, best known for his typography & calligraphy y
- Farhad Safinia, screenwriter, film/television producer, and director
- Reza Sixo Safai, director, actor, and producer
- Ely Sakhai, art engineer and civil engineer, owner of art galleries in New York City and Great Neck, New York
- Behnaz Sarafpour, fashion designer
- Louisa Shafia, chef and cookbook author
- Hadieh Shafie, visual artist, uses tightly coiled strips of brightly colored paper bearing calligraphy & arranged in patterns
- Philip Shahbaz, actor, known for his voice acting for the role of Altaïr in the Ubisoft video game Assassin's Creed
- Sarah Shahi, television actress; Iranian father, Iranian/Spanish Mother
- Sayeed Shahidi, child actor and model. Younger brother of Yara
- Yara Shahidi, actress, best known for her role as Zoey Johnson in the sitcom Black-ish (2014–present) and its spin-off series Grown-ish (2018–present).
- Amir Shervan, film director, producer, actor and screenwriter. Best known for his career in cinema in Iran prior to his immigration to the U.S. in 1987
- Shahram Shiva, performance poet
- Daryush Shokof, Artist-Filmmaker, philosopher
- Arash Sobhani, musician and television host
- Sheida Soleimani, multimedia artist, photographer, and professor of studio art at Brandeis University. Known for her work on Iranian human-rights violation victims, and her outspoken comments on the Iranian regime.
- Bahar Soomekh, actress
- Aramazd Stepanian, actor, producer, playwright. Owner, artistic director, and producer of the Luna Playhouse
- Tami Stronach, actress, dancer, choreographer
- Massy Tadjedin, screenwriter and director
- Elie Tahari, fashion designer
- Nader Talebzadeh, documentary filmmaker and researcher. Known for his TV series The Messiah
- Taravat Talepasand, contemporary artist addressing cultural taboos, juxtapose cultural stereotypes and express female empowerment. Chair of the Painting Department at the San Francisco Art Institute
- Shaun Toub, actor, best known internationally for playing Ho Yinsen in the Marvel Cinematic Universe films Iron Man (2008) and Iron Man 3 (2013)
- Pej Vahdat, actor, best known for his role of Arastoo Vaziri in Bones
- Sheila Vand, actress and performance artist
- Behrouz Vossoughi, actor and TV host.
- Elham Yaghoubian, writer, designer, political activist
- Bob Yari, film producer
- Manoucher Yektai, abstract expressionist artist who belongs to the New York School
- Suzi Yoonessi, filmmaker, best known for her award-winning feature film Dear Lemon Lima
- Necar Zadegan, film and television actress, best known for her recurrent role as First Lady (and then president) Dalia Hassan on 24, and Delia Banai on Girlfriends' Guide to Divorce
- Caveh Zahedi, film director and actor
- Firooz Zahedi, photographer, whose work has appeared in journalistic publications internationally, and as the movie posters for films such as Pulp Fiction, Edward Scissorhands, and The Addams Family
- Maryam Zahirimehr, screenwriter and film director
- Roxana Zal, actress
- Sara Zandieh, filmmaker and Fulbright Scholar at Columbia University
- Habib Zargarpour, art director, also active in visual effects in Hollywood
- Tony Zarrindast, film producer, film director, and actor
- Rayka Zehtabchi, filmmaker, 2018 Academy Award-winning documentary short Period. End of Sentence—first Iranian-American woman to win an Academy Award.

== Business and technology ==
- Sarkis Acopian, inventor, industrialist, environmentalist; founded the Acopian Technical Company in 1957, where he designed and manufactured the first solar radio.
- Vahe Aghabegians, entrepreneur, founding member and executive director of UniPrint, Inc. (a printing house), and was the former president of The Romney Group, Inc.
- Vahid Alaghband, founder and Chairman Balli Group PLC
- Siavash Alamouti, president and CEO of edge cloud software company mimic, former CTO Broad Band and INTEL fellow, inventor of Alamouti Code, code-communication engineer
- Mike Amiri, founder and Creative Director of AMIRI fashion line
- Amir Ansari, co-founder and CTO of Prodea Systems, co-founder and former CTO of Telecom Technologies, Inc. (TTI)
- Anousheh Ansari, the world's first female space tourist, first Iranian in space, co-founder and chairman of Prodea Systems, Inc., co-founder and former CEO of Telecom Technologies, Inc. (TTI)
- Cyrus A. Ansary, businessman, President of Investment Services International Co., founder and current chairman of Fort Knox National Company, and chairman emeritus of American University
- Emik Avakian, inventor, owner of numerous patents including a breath-operated computer, mechanism that facilitates putting wheelchairs on automobiles, and a self-operating robotic wheel
- Farhad Azima, airline operator and entrepreneur; founder of Global International Airways, and owner of the Aviation Leasing Group and HeavyLift International
- Sardar Biglari, founder, CEO and chairman of Biglari Holdings
- Nariman Behravesh, chief economist at the consulting firm IHS Markit, and formerly the chief economist and executive vice president of Global Insight, Inc
- Michael Benjamin (born Michael Benjamin Bonheur), private investor focusing on internet companies, Republican candidate for the United States Senate in 2004
- Afsaneh Mashayekhi Beschloss, businesswoman, entrepreneur and economist. Founder and CEO of the hedge-fund Rock Creek Group, former treasurer and chief investment officer of the World Bank
- J. Darius Bikoff, CEO and founder of Energy Brands, which manufactures VitaminWater
- Shahram Dabiri, video game producer, lead producer of World of Warcraft
- Jaleh Daie, Senior Managing Partner at Aurora Equity; former professor of biology at the University of Wisconsin-Madison and Rutgers University. First woman to serve on the U.S. Space Foundation board of directors.
- Perry Daneshgari, entrepreneur, civil and mechanical engineer, and author. He is the founder of MCA and specializes in agile construction
- Nader Darehshori, co-founder, chairman, president, and CEO of Aptius Education, director of State Street Corporation, former director of Aviva USA Corporation
- Bita Daryabari, philanthropist, entrepreneur and computer scientist
- Farzad Dibachi, serial entrepreneur and business executive. Co-founder and CEO of Inception.
- Avid Larizadeh Duggan, entrepreneur and venture capitalist
- Behdad Eghbali, co-founder of the investment firm Clearlake Capital.
- Kamran Elahian, founder and Chairman Global Catalyst Partners
- Henry Elghanayan, NYC real estate developer, co-founder and chairman of Rockrose Development Corporation
- Hossein Eslambolchi, former president and CEO of AT&T Labs and AT&T Global Network Operations
- Arash Ferdowsi, co-founder and CTO of Dropbox
- Nasir Gebelli, video game programmer for the Apple II, then Final Fantasy I, Final Fantasy II, Secret of Mana, and Rad Racer.
- Arthur T. Gregorian, oriental rug dealer based in Greater Boston, and author of books on oriental rugs.
- Victor Haghani, financier, one of the founding partners of Long Term Capital Management. He has also founded Elm Partners, an active index investment fund, in 2011.
- Albert Hakim, businessman and a figure in the Iran–Contra affair. Co-founder of the Stanford Technology Trading Group International (STTGI)
- Kamran Hakim, New York City-based landlord, real estate developer and founder of the Hakim Organization.
- Babak Hodjat, technologist and computer scientist.
- Neil Kadisha, CEO of Omninet Capital, LLC.
- Samy Kamkar, entrepreneur, computer hacker, and privacy & security researcher on mobile phone tracking. Creator of the SkyJack hacking drone, the Evercookie, and the MySpace super-virus "Samy" worm.
- Darius Kazemi, computer programmer, social activist, and artist. Co-founder of the worker-owned technology collective Feel Train.
- Sam Kazemian, software programmer; co-founder and president of Everipedia.
- Salar Kamangar, former CEO of YouTube, senior executive at Google.
- Kayvan Khalatbari, serial entrepreneur based in Denver, Colorado . Founding partner of the Sexy Pizza restaurant chain, Birdy Magazine, Sexpot Comedy, Denver Relief Consulting, and Denver Relief, the longest continually operated cannabis company in Denver.
- Nader Khalili, architect. Inventor of the Superadobe and Ceramic houses construction techniques. Founder of the California Institute of Earth Art and Architecture (Cal-Earth).
- Shaygan Kheradpir, businessman and technology executive. Former CIO of Verizon, former COO of Barclays Bank, and former CEO of Juniper Networks and Coriant.
- Dara Khosrowshahi, CEO of Uber; former CEO of Expedia; on board of directors of The New York Times Company.
- Mike Kohan, founder & owner of the Kohan Retail Investment Group based in Great Neck, New York, which owns 27 shopping malls as of late 2018.
- Omid Kordestani, executive chairman of Twitter, former senior vice president, chief business officer, and special advisor at Google.
- Isaac Larian, founder and CEO of MGA Entertainment; manufacturer of Bratz dolls.
- Hamid Moghadam, chairman and CEO of Prologis, board member of Stanford Management Company.
- Mahbod Moghadam, internet entrepreneur; co-founder and former Chief Community Officer of Everipedia, co-founder of Rap Genius (now Genius).
- Moj Mahdara, CEO of Beautycon Media, is an entrepreneur in the entertainment, digital, and emerging technology spaces.
- Milton Malek-Yonan, Iranian-Assyrian entrepreneur and inventor of Malekized Rice.
- Amir, Eskandar and Fraydun Manocherian, NYC-based real estate investors, founders of Manocherian Brothers and Pan Am Equities.
- David A. Marcus, former president of PayPal, and current vice president of messaging products at Facebook, where he heads the Facebook Messenger unit. Sits on the Coinbase board of directors. Iranian mother.
- Fariborz Maseeh, pioneer of micro-electro mechanical systems (MEMS), founder of IntelliSense, founder of Orlander LLC, and founder of Orbitron LP.
- Manny Mashouf, founder and former chairman of Bebe Stores.
- Saul Maslavi, president and CEO of Jovani Fashion.
- Cyrus Massoumi, co-founder of the investment fund "humbition." Founder and former CEO of Zocdoc.
- Justin Mateen, co-founder and former CMO of Tinder.
- David Merage, co-founder of Chef America Inc., manufacturer of Hot Pockets microwavable meals. Brother of Paul.
- Paul Merage, co-founder of Chef America Inc., manufacturer of Hot Pockets microwavable meals. Brother of David.
- Bob Miner, co-founder of Oracle Corporation and the producer of its relational database management system.
- Mohsen Moazami, entrepreneur; founder of Stanford Business Systems, Columbus Nova Technology Partners, and Seif Capital. He is also a member of Cisco Systems executive staff.
- Afshin Mohebbi, former president and COO of Qwest Communications International, Inc.
- Joseph Moinian, New York City real estate developer, founder of The Moinian Group.
- Jeff Moorad, businessman. Former general partner and CEO of MLB's Arizona Diamondbacks, and former vice-chairman and CEO of MLB's San Diego Padres.
- Jahm Najafi, founder and CEO of Najafi Companies, a private equity firm. Vice Chairman and co-owner of the Phoenix Suns NBA team.
- Ron Najafi, founder and CEO of Emery Pharma, and founder and former CEO of NovaBay Pharmaceuticals.
- Mohammad Namazi, founder of the Namazi Hospital in Shiraz, and was a resident in America for over 30 years.
- Ezri Namvar, founder of Namco Capital Group and former owner of the Security Pacific Bank.
- David Nazarian, businessman, investor, and philanthropist. Founder and CEO of Nimes Capital.
- Izak Parviz Nazarian, businessman, managing partner at Omninet Capital.
- Sam Nazarian, founder and CEO of the SBE Entertainment Group.
- Younes Nazarian, businessman. Early investor in Qualcomm and Chairman of Nazarian Enterprises.
- Farzad Nazem, former CTO and executive vice president of Yahoo!
- Fred Ohebshalom, New York City real estate developer and founder of Empire Management.
- Pierre Omidyar, founder of eBay.
- Joseph Parnes, investment advisor, founder and CEO of Technomart Investment Advisors.
- Ali Partovi, entrepreneur and angel investor. Best known as co-founder of Code.org, iLike, LinkExchange, and an early advisor of Dropbox.
- Shervin Pishevar, entrepreneur, co-founder and former executive chairman of Hyperloop One, co-founder and managing director of Sherpa Capital.
- Kamran Pourzanjani, early angel investor based in Los Angeles, California
- Sean Rad, co-founder, chairman and former CEO of Tinder
- Hooman Radfar, co-founder and CEO of Collective; co-founder and former CEO of AddThis; Venture Partner at Expa
- Mazdack Rassi, real estate and creative entrepreneur; co-founder of Milk Studios, Milk Makeup, and Camp David in New York City
- Mostafa Ronaghi, CTO and senior vice president at Illumina. He is also a molecular biologist specializing in DNA sequencing technology
- Ali Rowghani, COO of Twitter, and managing partner at Y Combinator
- Arman Sadeghi, entrepreneur and speaker
- Joel Simkhai, founder & former CEO of Grindr dating app
- Shahin (Shawn) Shadfar, founder and president of omNovia Technologies; co-founder and CEO of Xerzees Technologies, the company behind the mobile app Zurf
- John Shahidi, businessman, software developer, entertainment manager and podcast producer. CEO of Shots Podcast Network
- Sam Shahidi, businessman, software developer, entertainment manager and podcast producer. CCO and CPO of Shots Podcast Network
- Ben Shaoul, co-founder of Magnum Real Estate Group
- Henry D. Sahakian, founder and owner of Uni-Mart
- Rob Sobhani, chairman and CEO of Caspian Group, and founder and CEO of Faro Corporation; author and lecturer on energy issues, U.S. immigration policies, and U.S. policy towards the Middle East
- Parisa Tabriz, director of engineering at Google and computer security expert, nicknamed Google's "Security Princess." Co-founder of the Our Security Advocates conference
- Sina Tamaddon, senior vice president of Applications for Apple Computer
- Sohrab Vossoughi, product designer, and founder of Ziba Design, a design and innovation consultancy based in Portland, Oregon
- Roxanne Varza, director of Station F in Paris, France, and former head of start-up activities for Microsoft in France. Co-founder of Girls in Tech Paris and Girls in Tech London, which organize computer code writing courses for women
- Rouzbeh Yassini, Early contributor to cable modem development, executive director of the University of New Hampshire Broadband Center Of Excellence and Founder of YAS Foundation.
- Joe Youssefi, aerospace engineer and philatelist
- Bobby Yazdani, founder and former CEO of Saba Software
- Shayan Zadeh, founder of Zoosk
- Eli Zelkha, entrepreneur, and professor. He was the inventor of ambient intelligence

== Law administrators, lawyers, and judges ==
- Parry Aftab, Internet privacy and security lawyer, considered one of the founders of cyberlaw Founder of the cybersafety organizations WiredSafety, StopCyberbullying and the consulting firm, WiredTrust
- Zahra Karinshak (née Zahra Sheikholeslam), attorney, politician, and military veteran. Graduate from U.S. Air Force Academy (10th class of women), legal counsel to the Governor of Georgia, Assistant U.S. Attorney for the Northern District of Georgia (U.S. Department of Justice), named a "Best Lawyer in America" and "Super Lawyer" (top 100), first Iranian-American elected to the Georgia Legislature
- Yasmine Pahlavi, lawyer and wife of Reza Pahlavi, Crown Prince of Iran. Co-founder and former director of the Foundation for the Children of Iran. Resides in Bethesda, Maryland
- Shahla S. Sabet (born 1946), Iranian and American judge, lawyer; the first Iranian American judge in the State of California

== Literature ==
- Colet Abedi, young adult novelist and television producer
- Salar Abdoh, novelist and essayist. Current director of the graduate program in creative writing at the City College of New York.
- Kaveh Akbar, poet, scholar and novelist
- Lailee Bakhtiar, poet and author
- Fereydoon Batmanghelidj, writer of books on health and wellness.
- Najmieh Batmanglij, acclaimed chef and cookbook author
- William D. S. Daniel, Iranian-Assyrian author, poet, and musician
- Parvin Darabi, writer and women's rights activist. Best known for book Rage Against the Veil
- Jasmin Darznik, memoirist, novelist
- Firoozeh Dumas, author of Funny in Farsi: A Memoir of Growing Up Iranian in America
- Mohsen Emadi, poet, scholar and literary translator
- Sara Farizan, writer of young adult literature. Best known for novel, If You Could Be Mine (2013)
- FM-2030, author, teacher, transhumanist philosopher, futurist
- Marzieh Gail, Bahá'i writer, translator
- Ezzat Goushegir, fiction writer & playwright
- Roya Hakakian, writer, poet, and journalist
- Hakob Karapents, novelist and short story writer
- Persis Karim, poet, writer, educator
- Laleh Khadivi, novelist and documentary filmmaker
- Porochista Khakpour, novelist, essayist, and writer
- Tahereh Mafi, young adult fiction writer
- Mahtob Mahmoody, writer
- Faranak Margolese, writer
- Marsha Mehran, novelist
- Shokooh Mirzadegi, novelist and poet
- Azadeh Moaveni, author of Lipstick Jihad and co-author of Iran Awakening with Shirin Ebadi, and reporter for Time magazine on Iran and the Middle East
- Melody Moezzi, writer, attorney, and nonfiction writer
- Ottessa Moshfegh, novelist
- Farnoosh Moshiri, novelist, playwright, and librettist
- Dora Levy Mossanen, author of historical fiction
- Azar Nafisi, writer, best known for Reading Lolita in Tehran: A Memoir in Books
- Gina Nahai, novelist
- Dina Nayeri, novelist, essayist, and short story writer.
- Abdi Nazemian, author and screenwriter.
- Ghazal Omid, nonfiction political writer, nonfiction children's book writer, speaker, NGO executive
- Shahrnoosh Parsipour, writer, best known for "Women Without Men"
- Susan Atefat Peckham, poet
- Saïd Sayrafiezadeh, memoirist, playwright, and fiction writer
- Dalia Sofer, writer, best known for The Septembers of Shiraz
- Mahbod Seraji, novelist
- Mahmoud Seraji, a.k.a. "M.S. Shahed," poet
- Solmaz Sharif, poet,
- Niloufar Talebi, writer, literary translator, multidisciplinary creator, opera and classical music librettist, producer.
- Goli Taraghi, novelist
- Andrew David Urshan, evangelist and author.
- Sholeh Wolpe, poet, literary translator, playwright and librettist

== Medicine ==
- Syed Bozorg Mahmoody

== Media and journalism ==
- Mahtob Mahmoody journalism graduate and author of My Name is Mahtob
- Sohrab Ahmari, journalist, current op-ed editor at the New York Post and a contributing editor at the Catholic Herald. Former columnist and editor at The Wall Street Journal
- Yashar Ali, journalist who has contributed to HuffPost, NBC News, and New York magazine
- Masih Alinejad, journalist and author; presenter/producer for Voice of America - Persian, correspondent on Radio Farda, and frequent contributor to Manoto television
- Christiane Amanpour, journalist and television host; Chief International Anchor for CNN. Host of CNN International's nightly interview program Amanpour and of Amanpour & Company on PBS
- Nina Ansary, historian, author and media correspondent known for her work on women's equity in Iran.
- Saman Arbabi, journalist, cartoonist, and host, creator and executive producer of Voice of America - Persian's satirical television shows Parazit and OnTen
- Davar Ardalan, NPR producer of Tell Me More, Laleh Bakhtiar's daughter, Lailee's cousin
- Rudi Bakhtiar, producer for Reuters, best known for appearances on CNN; former Voice of America - Persian employee, former director of public relations for the Public Affairs Alliance of Iranian Americans (PAAIA)
- John Batchelor, author and host of the nationally syndicated The John Batchelor Show on AM 770 WABC radio
- Andy Baraghani, chef and writer; senior food editor of Bon Appétit from 2015 to 2021
- Shmuley Boteach, rabbi, radio and television host, author
- Ariana Bundy, chef, writer, and television personality. Best known for her cookery of Persian cuisine and travel series Ariana's Persian Kitchen which airs on Nat Geo People
- Lisa Daftari, journalist, TV commentator; founder of The Foreign Desk
- Borzou Daragahi, print and radio journalist; International Correspondent for The Independent, and former Baghdad bureau chief for the Los Angeles Times
- Holly Dagres, analyst and commentator on the Middle East with a focus on Iran. Curator for the weekly newsletter, The Iranist, .
- Sibel Edmonds, founder and editor-in-chief of independent news website NewsBud, founder and publisher of Boiling Frogs Post, and former contract translator for the Federal Bureau of Investigation (FBI)
- Azadeh Ensha, journalist, The New York Times
- Mahtab Farid, journalist for Voice of America - Persian, Radio Farda and Fox News, public diplomacy strategist, and Boren Scholar.
- Farnaz Fassihi, journalist, Wall Street Journal
- Caroline Framke, regular author and culture commentator at Vox, and has contributed to The Atlantic, The A.V. Club, Vulture, Salon and NPR. Iranian mother.
- Ramin Ganeshram, chef, cookbook author, and food columnist for The New York Times and Newsday
- Susie Gharib, award-winning business news journalist. Senior Special Correspondent for Fortune magazine, and former anchor of Nightly Business Report produced by CNBC
- Iraj Gorgin, prominent radio and television broadcaster and journalist in Iran prior to the 1979 Revolution. Former director of Radio Iran, and host of a program on contemporary Persian poetry at National Iranian Radio and Television
- Laci Green, YouTuber whose content focuses on sex education. Iranian father.
- Saba Hamedy, news editor at Huffington Post, and former breaking news reporter at CNN
- Seyed Mohammad Hosseini, former television host on the Islamic Republic of Iran Broadcasting (IRIB) until his exile to the U.S. in 2011. Advocate of the Islamic Republic of Iran through his political opposition group "Restart"
- Alireza Jafarzadeh, media commentator and US representative of the People's Mujahedin of Iran
- Pedram Javaheri, meteorologist for CNN International
- Kim Khazei, news anchor for 7News Boston WHDH-TV and its sister station WLVI-TV
- Hooman Majd, journalist, author, and commentator who writes on Iranian affairs
- Arash Markazi, sports journalist, currently writing for the Los Angeles Times and formerly for Sports Illustrated
- Leandra Medine, author, blogger, and humor writer best known for Man Repeller, an independent fashion and lifestyle website
- Shereen Marisol Meraji, co-host of Code Switch on NPR, a critically acclaimed podcast covering race, culture, and diversity issues
- Negar Mortazavi, journalist who covers Iran in both English and Farsi . Former host of an interactive current affairs show at Voice of America - Persian.
- Sina Najafi, founder and editor-in-chief of New York-based Cabinet Magazine.
- Soraya Sarhaddi Nelson, journalist and reporter for the National Public Radio (NPR), most notably for Morning Edition, All Things Considered, and Weekend Edition. Currently, director of the NPR bureau in Berlin.
- Samin Nosrat, chef, regular food columnist for The New York Times Magazine, and showrunner of the Netflix docu-series Salt, Fat, Acid, Heat based on her cookbook of the same name.
- Dari Nowkhah, lead anchor of the SEC Network, an American sports television network.
- Azi Paybarah, New York-based journalist who focuses on local politics, and has worked as a reporter for many local journalistic outlets of New York City such as the New York Press, the New York Observer, and WNYC, among several others.
- Shabnam Rezaei, co-founder of Big Bad Boo studios (originally named Norooz productions) and Oznoz. Creator & producer of the animated TV series 16 Hudson, 1001 Nights (the first animated television adaptation of the One Thousand and One Nights folks tales), and Mixed Nutz (a TV spinoff of her film Babak and Friends – A First Norooz).
- Jason Rezaian, journalist, served as Tehran bureau chief for The Washington Post. He was convicted of false espionage charges by the Iranian government in 2015, later released in 2016.
- Roosh V (Daryush Valizadeh), blogger, pickup artist and writer.
- Maer Roshan, editor-in-chief of Los Angeles Magazine, serial entrepreneur of several prominent magazines and websites, and former editor of New York (magazine), Talk (magazine), and Interview (magazine).
- Atoosa Rubenstein (Atoosa Behnegar), former Seventeen and CosmoGIRL! editor-in-chief.
- Roxana Saberi, photojournalist whose 2009 arrest in Iran became a cause celebre.
- Jahan Salehi, President of Agence Global, Inc. syndicate.
- Homa Sarshar, journalist, author, feminist activist. Columnist for Zan-e-Ruz magazine Kayhan daily newspaper (1964–1973).
- Anand Lal Shimpi, founder and former CEO of the technology journalism website, AnandTech.
- Elina Shirazi, journalist and Miami-based correspondent for the Fox News Channel.
- Ali Akbar Tabatabaei, former press attache to the Iranian Embassy in the United States during the reign of Shah Mohammad Reza Pahlavi. After his exile to the U.S. after the Iranian Revolution, he became president of the Iran Freedom Foundation in Bethesda, Maryland.
- Farnoosh Torabi, journalist, author, television personality, and personal finance expert. Host of CNBC Primetime series Follow The Leader and host of award-winning podcast So Money.
- Vahid Online, a pseudonym of an Iranian blogger and Internet activist, known for his coverage of the 2009 Iranian presidential election protests through social media.
- Ebrahim Victory, creator and host of the Channel One TV science program "The Wonders of the Universe" which discusses astronomy and cosmology to Farsi-speaking audiences.
- Cyma Zarghami, former president of Nickelodeon and Viacom Media Networks Kids & Family Group.
- Mohammad Kheirkhah Zoyari, photographer, has worked for United Press International and BBC and has covered events in the Middle East (especially in Iran during the 2009 Iranian presidential election protests), Europe and the United States.

== Music ==
- Evin Agassi, Iranian-Assyrian singer
- Elton Ahi, music producer and owner of Rusk Studios in Los Angeles, California, which has recorded artists such as Donna Summer, Elton John, and Laura Branigan, among many others.
- Azam Ali, singer and santour player. Member of the "alternative world" band VAS and the Iranian acoustic electronic group Niyaz.
- Sahba Aminikia, contemporary music composer, performer, and educator
- Andy, popular Iranian pop singer-songwriter and actor
- Aref Arefkia, Iranian pop singer and actor, known as "the king of Hearts" and "the legend of pop"
- Faramarz Aslani, Iranian pop and folk singer, guitarist
- Axiom of Choice, world music group who perform a modernized fusion style rooted in Persian classical music.
- Morteza Barjesteh, best known by stage name Morteza; Iranian pop singer-songwriter and composer who grew fame in Iran in 1980's.
- Tannoz Bahremand Foruzanfar, first Iranian woman to be ordained as a Jewish cantor in the United States in 2009
- Yak Ballz (stage name of Yashar Zadeh), independent hip hop artist and one of the original members of The Weathermen
- Rostam Batmanglij, composer, multi-instrumentalist, and music producer. Former keyboard player of indie rock band Vampire Weekend, and currently part of the electro-soul group Discovery
- Em Beihold, pop singer-songwriter
- Leila Bela, avant-garde musician, actress, playwright, photographer, and former member of Pigface
- Cyrus Bolooki, drummer of New Found Glory
- George Chaharbakhshi, Iranian-Assyrian singer active in the United States.
- Vigen Derderian, best known as Vigen. prominent Iranian pop music singer and actor; known as the "King of Iranian Pop" and the "Sultan of Jazz"
- Amir Derakh, guitarist and synthesizer player for Julien-K, guitarist of the band Dead by Sunrise, former guitar synthesizer player for Orgy, and former guitarist of Rough Cutt
- Deep Dish, electronic music group
- Dubfire (Ali Shirazinia), house and techno DJ and producer; formerly a member of Deep Dish
- Wafah Dufour, singer-songwriter, socialite, model
- Eden xo (stage name of Jessica Eden Malakouti), singer, songwriter, and actress
- Mahan Esfahani, harpsichordist
- Kristina Esfandiari, singer-songwriter who is best known as the lead vocalist of the doom metal band "King Woman" (signed to Sargent House) and her solo moniker "Miserable"
- Ardeshir Farah, musician and guitarist, makes up one half of duo Strunz & Farah
- Rana Farhan, musician and singer of jazz and blues. Known to combine classic Persian poetry with modern jazz and blues.
- Cyrus Forough, concert violinist. He is a professor of violin and chamber music at Carnegie Mellon University
- Leila Forouhar, Iranian pop and classical singer, model, and actress
- Shahyar Ghanbari, Iranian pop singer and songwriter, poet, film director, and radio/TV producer.
- Aram Gharabekian, conductor, former Artistic Director and Principal Conductor of the National Chamber Orchestra of Armenia. Founder, and until 1996, directed and conducted the Boston SinfoNova Orchestra
- Googoosh, Iranian pop singer, actress and superstar, female pop singer in the Persian speaking world
- Haale (stage name of Haale Gafori), singer, composer, and poet. Sings in both English and Farsi, and has recorded music albums with both her own poetry and those of Rumi, Attar, and Forough Farrokhzad
- Pejman Hadadi, internationally acclaimed tonbak player and Persian classical musician. Member of Axiom of Choice and the Dastan Ensemble
- Hayedeh, singer of Persian classical, folk, and pop music. Considered one of the most popular singers of 20th century Iran. Immigrated to the U.S. in 1982
- Mohammad Heydari, prominent santur player and songwriter
- Mehrdad Asemani, Iranian pop singer and songwriter,
- K-Salaam (stage name of Kayvon Sarfehjooy), DJ and music producer
- Kayhan Kalhor, kamancheh player, composer and master of classical Kurdish and Persian traditional music
- Tara Kamangar, pianist and composer
- Shahrum Kashani, better known as Shahrum K or K; Iranian pop singer
- Leila Kasra, better known as Hedieh; Iranian contemporary poet and lyricist. Best known for writing 30 songs for Hayedeh.
- Mamak Khadem, world trance music singer; former lead singer of Axiom of Choice
- Anousheh Khalili, singer-songwriter and electronic musician, who has collaborated as a vocalist with Deep Dish and Sharam
- Bahador Kharazmi, singer, songwriter, producer
- Locksmith (stage name of Davood Ali Asgari), rapper and one half of the former underground duo The Frontline, which pioneered the "New Bay" resurgence movement in the Bay Area in the 2000s.
- Mahasti, singer of Persian classical, folk, and Persian pop. Younger sister of Hayedeh. Immigrated to the U.S. in 1981.
- Foad Manshadi, also known as Foad; musician who utilizes his style of world music-inspired rap to bring light to social justice issues
- Mansour, Iranian pop singer and songwriter based in Southern California
- Rana Mansour, pop and jazz singer
- Lotfi Mansouri, opera director and manager; former General Director of the San Francisco Opera (1988–2001)
- Soheil Nasseri, concert pianist
- Sadegh Nojouki, pop and classical composer, conductor, songwriter, arranger, and pianist. Introduced the combined music style of Persian traditional music with classical and pop music.
- Nostalghia, singer-songwriter, post-industrial musician, and poet. Iranian mother.
- Ahmad Pejman, classical composer, notable for both operatic and symphonic works
- Tony Petrossian, music video director
- Pouya Jalili Pour, Iranian pop singer famous for his "Safar" (Journey) song released in 2000. Currently resides in Los Angeles, California
- Pouya, rapper
- Armen Ra, thereminist, performer, artist, director and production designer
- Behzad Ranjbaran, composer
- Kaveh Rastegar, Grammy-nominated bass guitarist and composer. Founder of Kneebody and Dakah. He has collaborated with CeeLo Green, Bruno Mars, and De La Soul
- Gity Razaz, composer
- Susan Roshan, singer-songwriter
- Shahrdad Rouhani, composer, violinist/pianist, and conductor
- Sacha Sacket, pop singer-songwriter. Iranian father
- Kamran Sadeghi, electronic musician, producer, and mix-engineer
- Manoochehr Sadeghi, Ostād (Grandmaster) of the santur. Recipient of a 2003 National Heritage Fellowship of the National Endowment of the Art
- Ilya Salmanzadeh, music producer
- Bijan Samandar, prominent contemporary poet, lyricist, and Tar player. He has written lyrics for notable artists such as Ebi, Vigen, Moein, Dariush, and many more
- Hassan Sattar, best known by Sattar, singer of Iranian pop and classical music popular during pre-revolutionary Iran. Immigrated to the U.S. in 1978.
- Shahrzad Sepanlou, Iranian pop singer. Her songs reflect subjects such as revolution, war, and repression.
- Shahram Shabpareh, Iranian pop singer and songwriter
- Kouros Shahmiri, Persian pop singer, best known for being part of the pop duo Andy & Kouros with Andy
- Saeed Shahram, composer of film and television scores. He has over 40 film soundtracks to his credit since 1983.
- Sharam (Sharam Tayebi), techno and house DJ and producer
- Jamshied Sharifi, film composer, musician, and producer
- Ziba Shirazi, singer and poet. Her music blends Persian melodies with world music and jazz.
- Susan, Persian pop singer popular in Iran during the 1960s and 1970s. She immigrated to the U.S. after the 1979 revolution
- Ali Tabatabaee, one of the lead singers of Orange County, California-based pop-punk band Zebrahead
- Loga Ramin Torkian, musician, composer, and co-founder of the bands Axiom of Choice and Niyaz. Plays the Iranian tar, the Turkish saz, and the GuitarViol
- Shamiram Urshan, singer of Assyrian folk music and entertainer who gained popularity in the 1980s in Iran
- Reza Vali, musician and composer. Currently on faculty at Carnegie Mellon University
- Omid Walizadeh, also known as Omid or OD; hip hop producer
- The Yellow Dogs, indie rock and post-punk revival group; formed in Tehran, now based in Brooklyn, New York
- Azita Youssefi, experimental musician, artist, and music teacher involved in the Chicago no wave scene in the 1990s, playing in Scissor Girls, Miss High-Heel (with Weasel Walter and Jim O'Rourke) and Bride of No No
- Kayvon Zand, New York City-based nightlife personality and musician who creates 80's inspired electronic dance music. H
- Kourosh Zolani, composer, soloist and inventor; designed and plays the world's only playable Chromatic Santour

== Politics ==
- Raumesh Akbari, member of the Tennessee Senate
- Roozbeh Aliabadi, advisor and commentator on geopolitical risk and geoeconomics. Current partner at global affair practice at GGA in New York City, former Senior Advisor to the Department of Strategic Initiatives, Ministry of Foreign Affairs in Iran
- Mahnaz Afkhami, women's rights activist who served in the Cabinet of Iran from 1976 to 1978; Executive Director of the Washington-based Foundation for Iranian Studies, and the founder and president of the Women's Learning Partnership (WLP)
- Goli Ameri, former Under Secretary General for Humanitarian Values and Diplomacy for the International Federation of Red Cross and Red Crescent Societies, former U.S. Assistant Secretary of State for Educational and Cultural Affairs, former U.S. public delegate to the United Nations General Assembly, and former Republican candidate for the United States House of Representatives from the 1st district of Oregon.
- Cyrus Amir-Mokri, former Assistant Secretary of the Treasury for Financial Institutions at the U.S. Treasury Department
- Jamshid Amouzegar, economist and politician who served as Prime Minister of Iran (1977–1978). Immigrated to U.S. in 1978
- Yassamin Ansari, US Representative (2024- ), Democrat U.S. House from 3rd District of Arizona
- Hushang Ansary, former Iranian Minister of Economic Affairs and Finance, former Ambassador of Iran to the United States (1967–1969) and chairman of National Finance Committee of Bush-Cheney 2004 campaign.
- Gholam Reza Azhari, military leader and Prime Minister of Iran (1978–1979). Immigrated to the U.S. in 1979
- Pantea Beigi, human rights advocate, known for her media appearances commenting on the human rights conditions in Iran in the wake of the 2009 Iranian presidential election protests. She has served as an AmeriCorps member for the PeaceJam foundation, notably working with Dr. Shirin Ebadi in her efforts to address social and economic injustices of the youth in Iran
- Stephanie Bice, US Representative (2020- ), Republican U.S. House from 5th District of Oklahoma
- Makan Delrahim, United States Assistant Attorney General for the United States Department of Justice Antitrust Division under the Trump Administration
- Jimmy Delshad, former mayor of Beverly Hills, California (2007–2008, 2010–2011), first Iranian-born mayor of an American city
- Eugene Dooman, counselor at the United States Embassy in Tokyo during the period of critical negotiations between the U.S. and Japan before World War II
- Abdullah Entezam, Iranian diplomat, Iranian ambassador to France (1927) and to West Germany, secretary of the Iranian embassy in the United States. Father of Hume Horan
- Anna Eshoo, U.S. Representative of California's 18th congressional district
- Anna Eskamani, member of the Florida House of Representatives.
- Abbas Farzanegan, former governor of the state of Esfahan, communications minister and diplomat during Mohammad Reza Pahlavi's reign. Key figure in facilitation of the 1953 Iranian coup d'état. Immigrated to the U.S. in 1975
- Rey Garofano, member of the Vermont House of Representatives Council
- Shireen Ghorbani, at-large member of the Salt Lake County Council, representing 1.1 million residents
- Rostam Giv, 3rd representative of Iranian Zoroastrians in Iranian parliament, senator of the Iranian Senate, and philanthropist to the Zoroastrian community in Iran, then United States, and the world. Immigrated to the U.S. in 1978.
- Ferial Govashiri, served as the Personal Secretary to U.S. President Barack Obama at the White House (2014–2017). Currently is the chief of staff to the chief content officer of Netflix
- Cyrus Habib, 16th Lieutenant Governor of Washington, and president of the Washington State Senate. First and so far only Iranian-American elected to state office
- Kamal Habibollahi, last commander of the Imperian Iranian Navy until the Iranian Revolution and the last CNO commander of the Pahlavi dynasty. Also held several minister positions under the military government of Gholam Reza Azhari in 1978. Immigrated to the U.S. after the Iranian Revolution
- Shamsi Hekmat, women's rights activist who pioneered reforms in women's status in Iran. Founded the first Iranian Jewish women's organization (Sazman Banovan Yahud i Iran) in 1947. After immigrating to the U.S., she established the Iranian Jewish Women's Organization of Southern California.
- Shahram Homayoun, political dissident of the government of the Islamic Republic of Iran, and owner of "Channel One," a Persian satellite TV station based in Los Angeles that broadcasts into Iran daily
- Hume Horan, diplomat and former U.S. ambassador to Cameroon, Equatorial Guinea, Sudan, Saudi Arabia, and the Ivory Coast. Son of Abdullah Entezam
- Fereydoon Hoveyda, former Iranian ambassador to the United Nations (1971–1979). Since his exile to the U.S., senior fellow and member of the executive committee of the National Committee on American Foreign Policy (NCAFP)
- Shaban Jafari, political figure, practitioner of Pahlevani and zoorkhaneh rituals. Key figure in the facilitation of the 1953 Iranian coup d'état. Exiled to the United States soon after the 1979 revolution
- Cyrus Javadi, Oregon state representative
- Anna Kaplan (née Anna Monahemi), first Iranian-American elected to New York State Senate
- Mehdi Khalaji, political analyst, writer, and scholar of Shia Islamic studies. Senior research fellow at the Washington Institute for Near East Policy, a D.C.-based foreign policy think tank. He has frequently contributed to journalistic outlets such as BBC, The Guardian, The Washington Post, and The New York Times
- Alan Khazei, social entrepreneur; founder and CEO of "Be The Change, Inc", dedicated to building coalitions among non-profit organizations and citizen . Co-founder and former CEO of City Year, an AmeriCorps national service program
- Bijan Kian, businessman, member of the board of directors of the Export–Import Bank of the United States, Partner of Michael Flynn in the Flynn Intel Group, and worked with the first Trump administration transition team in regards to the Office of the Director of National Intelligence
- Paul Larudee, political activist and a major figure in the pro-Palestinian movement. He is involved in the International Solidarity Movement and the founder of the Free Gaza Movement and the Free Palestine Movement
- Ahmad Madani, former commander of the Imperial Iranian Navy (1979), governor of the Khuzestan province, and candidate of the first Iranian presidential election. After his exile to the United States in 1980, he was the chairman of the National Front outside of Iran.
- Cyrus Mehri, attorney and partner at Mehri & Skalet. Best known for helping establish the National Football League's (NFL) Rooney Rule
- Mariam Memarsadeghi, democracy and human rights advocate
- Ross Mirkarimi, former member of San Francisco City Council and former San Francisco Sheriff. Co-founder of the Green Party of California
- Shayan Modarres, civil right activist known for his representation of the family of Trayvon Martin, and a 2014 Democratic primary candidate for the U.S. House from the 10th district of Florida
- Valentine Moghadam, feminist scholar, sociologist, activist, and author
- Esha Momeni, women's rights activist and a member of the One Million Signatures campaign
- David Nahai, environmental attorney, political activist, former head of the Los Angeles Department of Water and Power
- Adrin Nazarian, Member of the Los Angeles City Council from the 2nd district. Former member of the California State Assembly from the 46th district. First Iranian-American elected to the California State Legislature
- John J. Nimrod, minority rights activist and Illinois state senator of District 4 (1973–1983) of Iranian-Assyrian descent; notable for his promotion of Assyrian causes and for the rights of other under-represented minority groups throughout the world, such as Uyghurs and Tibetans
- Alex Nowrasteh, immigration policy analyst currently at the Center for Global Liberty and Prosperity at the Cato Institute, and previously at the Competitive Enterprise Institute. He is a national expert on immigration policy
- Prince Abdul Reza Pahlavi, son of Reza Shah and half-brother of Mohammad Reza Pahlavi. Immigrated to the U.S. with other relatives immediately prior to the Islamic revolution of 1979
- Prince Ali-Reza Pahlavi, younger son of Mohammad Reza Pahlavi and Farah Pahlavi. He was second in the order of succession to the Iranian throne prior to the Iranian revolution.
- Princess Ashraf Pahlavi, twin sister of Mohammad Reza Pahlavi. Considered to be the "power behind her brother" and instrumental in the 1953 coup d'état which led him taking the throne. Served her brother as a Palace advisor and a strong advocate for women's rights.
- Farah Pahlavi, widow of Mohammad Reza Shah and former shahbanu (empress) of Iran
- Princess Farahnaz Pahlavi, eldest daughter of Mohammad Reza Pahlavi and Farah Pahlavi. Currently resides in New York City
- Reza Pahlavi, Crown Prince of Iran, last heir apparent of the Imperial State of Iran and current head of the exiled House of Pahlavi. Oldest son of Mohammad Reza Pahlavi and Farah Pahlavi. Founder and former leader of the National Council of Iran. Currently resides in Bethesda, Maryland.
- Shams Pahlavi, elder sister of Mohammad Reza Pahlavi. Former president of the Red Lion and Sun Society. Exiled to the United States after the 1979 revolution
- Mehrdad Pahlbod, Iranian royal and first culture minister of Iran (1964–1968). He was the second husband of Princess Shams Pahlavi. Immigrated to the U.S. and resided in Los Angeles after the 1979 revolution
- Trita Parsi, founder and current president of the National Iranian American Council. He regularly writes articles and appears on TV to comment on foreign policy
- Noraladin Pirmoazzen, Iranian politician who served as a member of the 6th and 7th Islamic Consultative Assembly from the electorate of Ardabil, Nir, Namin and Sareyn. Immigrated to the U.S. in 2008.
- Azita Raji, former United States Ambassador to Sweden appointed by Barack Obama
- Farajollah Rasaei, Commander of the Imperial Iranian Navy (1961–1972), the most Senior Naval Commander of the Iranian Navy. Exiled to the U.S. after the 1979 revolution
- Parviz Sabeti, former SAVAK deputy under the regime of Mohammad Reza Shah. One of the most powerful men in the last two decades of the Pahlavi regime. Exiled to the U.S. in 1979.
- Ahsha Safaí, elected member of the San Francisco Board of Supervisors representing Supervisorial District 11
- David Safavian, disgraced former chief of staff of the United States General Services Administration
- Karim Sanjabi, Iranian politician of the National Front of Iran. Settled in the U.S. after the 1979 revolution
- Hajj Sayyah, famous world traveler and political activist. He is the first Iranian to obtain an American citizenship. Played a major role in the Persian Constitutional Revolution of 1906.
- Mohsen Sazegara, pro-democracy political activist and journalist. He held several offices in the government of Mir-Hossein Mousavi. His reformist policies clashed with the Supreme Leader Ali Khamenei, eventually resulting in his arrest and later exile. He currently resides in the U.S.
- Farhad Sepahbody, former ambassador of Iran to Morocco (1976–1979). Exiled to the U.S. after the Iranian Revolution
- Soraya Serajeddini, Iranian-Kurdish human rights activist. Former executive vice president of the Kurdish National Congress of North America.
- Mehdi Shahbazi, political activist and businessman. He was known for protest against major oil companies at the grounds of his Shell Oil gas station franchises
- Azadeh N. Shahshahani, human rights attorney
- Ali Shakeri, activist and businessman. Serves on the Community Advisory Board of the Center for Citizen Peacebuilding at the University of California, Irvine, and is the founder and active member of Ettehade Jomhourikhahan-e Iran (EJI), which advocates for a democratic and secular republic in Iran. He was one of the four Iranian-Americans detained by the Iranian government in May 2007.
- Jafar Sharif-Emami, former prime minister of Iran (1960–1961, 1978–1979), former president of the Iranian Senate (1964–1978), and former Minister of Foreign Affairs of Iran (1960). Exiled to the U.S. in the wake of the Iranian Revolution
- Faryar Shirzad, former Deputy National Security Advisor and White House Deputy Assistant for International Economic Affairs to President George W. Bush
- Ramin Toloui, current professor of practice at Stanford University. Former Assistant Secretary for International Finance, United States Department of the Treasury
- Roozbeh Farahanipour, Iranian Americans Activist, business owners, West Los Angeles Chamber of Commerce CEO, Politicians
- Bob Yousefian, former mayor of Glendale, California
- Larry Zarian, former mayor of Glendale, California

== Sports ==
- Ali Abdo, boxer and founder of Persepolis Athletic and Cultural Club
- Salman Agah, professional skateboarder
- Alex Agase, American football guard and linebacker who played with the Cleveland Browns before becoming head football coach at Northwestern University and Purdue University
- Andre Agassi, professional tennis player
- Emmanuel Agassi, former boxer and the father and former coach of Andre Agassi
- Daniel Alaei, professional poker player
- Kambiz Atabay, former president of the Asian Football Confederation (1976–1978), former president of the Football Federation of Iran (1972–1979).
- Esfandiar Baharmast, World Cup soccer referee, FIFA Instructor, known as Esse Baharmast, officiated in 1998 World Cup Soccer, 1996 Olympics in Atlanta, recipient of MLS Golden Whistle Award, NASO Golden Whistle Award and US Soccer 2020 Award
- David Bakhtiari, football offensive tackle for the Green Bay Packers of the National Football League (NFL), father is Iranian
- Jim Bakhtiar, fullback and placekicker for the Virginia Cavaliers football team (1955–1957). After attaining his medical degree in 1963, he moved to Iran and established the country's first psychiatric unit
- Eric Bakhtiari, linebacker in the NFL, most recently for the San Francisco 49ers. father is Iranian
- Steven Beitashour, Iranian-American soccer player, plays for Los Angeles FC and previously for the Iranian national football team
- Farzad Bonyadi, world poker champion; he has won 3 World Series of Poker bracelets
- Hassan Chitsaz, world's oldest active and licensed professional boxer mixed martial artist.
- Ariya Daivari, professional wrestler signed to AEW
- Shawn Daivari, professional wrestler and manager, better known by his stage names of Sheik Abdul Bashir, Khosrow Daivari, or simply Daivari
- Beneil Dariush, professional mixed martial artist competing in the Lightweight division of the UFC.
- Hamid Dastmalchi, world champion of poker, who has won 3 World Series of Poker bracelets
- Dorsa Derakhshani, chess player, Woman Grandmaster and International Master. Currently playing for the Saint Louis University Chess Team
- Antonio Esfandiari, champion poker player, and former professional magician
- Mori Eskandani, champion poker player and producer of American poker television programs Poker After Dark, High Stakes Poker, and the National Heads-Up Poker Championship
- Alecko Eskandarian, American soccer player. Played as defender for the F.C. Ararat Tehran, Taj SC and the New York Cosmos of the North American Soccer League
- Andranik Eskandarian, former soccer player
- Ali Eslami, high-stakes poker player. One of the first two people to win the Man-Machine Poker Competition against Polaris. Member of the U.S. poker team in the inaugural International Federation of Poker's Poker Nation's Cup
- Ali Farokhmanesh, former professional basketball player and current assistant coach for the Colorado State Rams men's basketball team.
- Matt Ghaffari, Olympic silver medal-winning wrestler, and MMA fighter
- Afshin Ghotbi, soccer coach, former assistant coach of Korea Republic national football team, Los Angeles Galaxy and Iran national team
- Hamed Haddadi, professional basketball player
- Andre Heidari, American football placekicker, played college football for the USC Trojans
- Ali Haji-Sheikh, American football placekicker who played for the Atlanta Falcons, Washington Redskins, and the New York Giants
- Cyrus Hobbi, American football offensive lineman for the USC Trojans
- T. J. Houshmandzadeh, former NFL wide receiver who played for the Oakland Raiders, Baltimore Ravens, and the Seattle Seahawks
- The Iron Sheik (Khosrow Vaziri), retired professional wrestler
- Saeed Kadkhodaian, retired professional soccer player and current president of Azad, Inc. Soccer USA and Doostan, Inc. Soccer USA. Previously owned, coached and played for the Austin Sockadillos and owned the Minnesota Thunder (2005–2007). 2006 inductee to the United Soccer Leagues Hall of Fame
- King Kamali (Shahriar Kamali), IFBB professional bodybuilder
- Danny Karbassiyoon, professional soccer player, played for Arsenal, Ipswich Town and Burnley
- Ali Kazemaini, soccer forward and former men's head coach at Cleveland State University.
- Arsalan Kazemi, former basketball player for the Washington Wizards and the first Iranian to ever be drafted into the NBA. Currently plays for Petrochimi Bandar Imam of the Iranian Basketball Super League
- Kamy Keshmiri, retired discus thrower, winner of the gold medal in the men's discus throw event at the 1989 Summer Universiade
- Ameen Khosravian, professional basketball player, and founder & CEO of the international clothing/apparel brand Pirouzi Athletics
- Armin Mahbanoozadeh, figure skater
- Ben Mahdavi, American football linebacker and long snapper. He has played for the Atlanta Falcons, Indianapolis Colts, and the Amsterdam Admirals
- George Malek-Yonan, Iran's "Champion of Champions" in track & field and pentathlon
- Sanaz Marand, tennis player
- Adam Mazarei, basketball coach, currently the assistant coach for the Vanderbilt Commodores of the Southeastern Conference
- Fred McNair, former professional tennis player, Lailee's brother, Laleh Bakhtiar's nephew
- Garnik Mehrabian, soccer player and coach
- Vahid Mirzadeh, tennis player
- Omid Namazi, renowned soccer coach & retired professional soccer defender. Currently the assistant manager of United States U20
- Cha Cha Namdar, soccer player who played in the Major Indoor Soccer League, North American Soccer League and Continental Indoor Soccer League.
- Petros Nazarbegian, boxer, competed in the 1952 Summer Olympics as a member of the Iran senior national Boxing team. Head coach of Iranian national boxing team (1954–1963). Immigrated to the U.S. after the 1979 revolution
- Amin Abraham Paul Nikfar, shot put for the Iranian National Team and finished 1st in the Asian Indoor Championships in Iran in 2004
- Arash Noamouz, soccer left midfielder, who played for the Los Angeles Galaxy, the Iran national football team, Poora, Pas, and Bahman
- Shar Pourdanesh, American football offensive lineman who had played in the National Football League for the Washington Redskins, Pittsburgh Steelers, and Oakland Raiders from 1996 to 2001. He is distinguished as the first Iranian to play in the National Football League
- Farrukh Quraishi, soccer player, who spent six seasons in the North American Soccer League playing for the Tampa Bay Rowdies and Calgary Boomers. President and general manager of the Tampa Bay Rowdies (2014–2015)
- Jahon Rad, professional soccer player who plays for the Swope Park Rangers in the USL Championship. Twin brother of Kaveh
- Kaveh Rad, professional soccer player who plays for the Swope Park Rangers in the USL Championship. Twin brother of Jahon
- Rhett Rakhshani, ice hockey forward
- Mike Rostampour, professional basketball player, plays for the Iranian national basketball team
- Amir Sadollah, professional mixed martial artist and winner of The Ultimate Fighter 7
- Nima Saghafi, soccer referee in Major League Soccer
- Behdad Sami, first professional Iranian basketball player in American history
- Steve Sarkisian, American football coach and former player; current offensive coordinator for the Alabama Crimson Tide, and former offensive coordinator for the Atlanta Falcons of the National Football League
- Michael Shabaz, tennis player, 2005 Wimbledon boys' doubles championship
- Kamal Shalorus, mixed martial artist, formerly competing in the UFC and the WEC. Currently competing in ONE FC
- Kamran Shirazi, International Master of chess
- Yasmin Siraj, figure skater and the 2010 U.S. junior silver medalist
- Amir Vahedi, professional poker player
- Leila Vaziri, competitive swimmer, gold medalist at the 2007 World Aquatics Championships, and former world record holder of the 50m women's backstroke
- Hooman Tavakolian, sport diplomat and lobbyist, Hall of Fame, wrestler
- Kia Zolgharnain, retired soccer forward, led the American Indoor Soccer Association in scoring during 1986–1987 season

== Religion ==
- Shua'u'llah Behai, known in the Baháʼí tradition as "Mirza Shua'u’llah". Eldest grandson of Bahá'u'lláh, the founder-prophet of the Baháʼí Faith, and son of Mírzá Muhammad `Alí. Only known descendant of the Baháʼí prophet to have become an American citizen
- Jacob David, pastor and relief worker
- David Shofet, founder and chief rabbi of the Nessah Synagogue in Beverly Hills, California. Son of former chief rabbi of Iran Yedidia Shofet and current recognized spiritual leader of Persian Jewry
- Yedidia Shofet, former chief rabbi of Iran and spiritual leader of worldwide Persian Jewry
- Ahmad Sohrab, Baháʼí, author who served as Abdu'l-Bahá's secretary and interpreter (1912–1919). Co-founder of the New History Society and Caravan of East and West in New York City, which aimed to spread the teachings of the Baháʼí Faith through international correspondence and education. Ex-communicated from the Baháʼí Faith by Shoghi Effendi in 1939.
- Daniel Haqiqatjou, Islamic philosopher and Da'i

== See also ==
- Betty Mahmoody
- Modern Iranian scientists and engineers
- US-Iran relations
- List of British Iranians
- List of Iranian artists
- List of Iranian women artists
- List of Iranians
- Not Without My Daughter
