= Shafie =

Shafie is a name. People with this name include:

- Abdel Aziz Abdel Shafie (born 1952), Egyptian football manager
- Ghazali Shafie (1922-2010), Malaysian politician
- Hadieh Shafie (born 1969), Iranian-American visual artist
- Majed el-Shafie, campaigner based in Canada
- Mohd Shafie Zahari (born 1993), Malaysian footballer
- Shafie Apdal (born 1956), Malaysian politician
- Shafie Effendy (born 1995), Bruneian footballer
- Shafie Salleh (born 1946), Malaysian politician
