= Abbas Ardehali =

Iranian-American cardiothoracic surgeon

Abbas Ardehali is an Iranian-American cardiothoracic surgeon at the David Geffen School of Medicine at UCLA. Dr. Ardehali holds the William E. Connor Endowed Chair in Cardiothoracic Transplantation at UCLA. He is the Director of UCLA's Heart, Lung, and Heart-Lung Transplant programs, ranked by United Network Organ Sharing (UNOS) as the largest program in the United States.

He is a pioneer in the field of heart and lung transplantation, constantly pushing the boundaries of what is possible in organ transplantation. Dr. Ardehali was the principal investigator behind technology that allows for the transportation of a breathing human heart or lung for an extended period of time. In 2023, he gave a TED Talk on the miracle of organ donation and cutting-edge medical advances in machine perfusion — a portable platform that keeps organs alive outside of the body — that could help put time back on the patient's side.

== Early life and education ==
Abbas Ardehali was born in Tehran, Iran and moved to the United States at age sixteen. After completing school, he attended Rutgers University, where he received his Bachelors of Science Degree. He then went on to complete his MD at Emory University School of Medicine in 1986. Originally pursuing a career in Cardiology, he completed his Internal Medicine internship (1986-1987) and residency (1987-1989) at the UC San Francisco School of Medicine. He additionally completed 1 year of a Cardiology fellowship at the UC San Francisco School of Medicine in 1990 before changing career paths.

== Career ==
Ardehali completed his surgical internship (1990-1991), surgical residency (1991-1995), and thoracic surgical residency (1995-1997) at UCLA School of Medicine.

Dr. Ardehali has been a faculty member at UCLA since 1997. He served as Chief of Cardiothoracic Surgery at West Los Angeles Veterans Hospital from 1998 to 2012. Now, Dr. Ardehali serves as the surgical director of UCLA's Heart and Lung Transplant program. He is the William E. Connor Chair in Cardiothoracic Transplantation, and a Professor of Surgery and Medicine at UCLA School of Medicine, Division of Cardiothoracic surgery. The program has been one of the largest lung transplant programs on the west coast.

Dr. Ardehali was involved in developing technology that allows for transporting a breathing human heart or lung for an extended period of time and was the first surgeon in the United States to perform a 'breathing lung' transplant in 2011.

He has served as a volunteer on several committees for UNOS and several scientific organizations, with leadership positions in the International Society of Heart and Lung Transplantation, American Society of Transplant Surgeons, American Association of Thoracic Surgery, and Society of Thoracic Surgeons.

Ardehali has been interviewed by ABC News, the Associated Press, CNN, Fox News, NBC News, CBS News, "The Doctor's Show", and Al Jazeera America, and a 2023 TED talk on "Future of Organ Transplantation". He has been invited to lecture 100+ times, and he has been the recipient of Ellis Island Medal of Honor in 2017.

== Awards ==
- 2017, Ellis Island Medal of Honor by the National Ethnic Coalition of Organizations
- 2013, Breath of Life Innovation Award from the Cystic Fibrosis Foundation
- 2012, Resolution of Commendation by the California State Assembly
- 2011–Present, Castle Connolly Medical Ltd. Top Doctor
- 2010-13 Guide to America's Top Surgeons
- 2008-2013, Vitals Patient's Choice Award
- 2007–Present, Best Doctors in America
- 2007–Present, Los Angeles & Southern California Super Doctors
- 2005, Scleroderma Foundation Spirit of Leadership Award, Los Angeles

== Personal life ==
He and his wife live with their two daughters in Los Angeles, California. Abbas Ardehali served as a Trustee of the Brentwood School from 2013 to 2015.

== Selected publications ==
Dr. Abbas Ardehali has authored numerous book chapters, published more than 180+ peer-reviewed publications and 350+ abstracts, and currently holds numerous patents that are issued or filed.

- 2016, Co-authored a textbook, "Khonsari's Cardiac Surgery: Safeguards and Pitfalls in Operative Technique"
- Wickii Vigneswaran, Edward Garrity and John Odell, Lung Transplantation: Principles and Practice, 2016; Chapter 25: Lung Transplantation for Connective Tissue Disorders
- Parsons P, Wiener-Kronish, J, Ardehali A. Critical Care Secrets, Fifth Edition, 2012.
- Kobashigawa JA, Patel JK, Kittleson MM, Kawano MA, Kiyosaki KK, Davis SN, Moriguchi JD, Reed EF, Ardehali AA. The long-term outcome of treated sensitized patients who undergo heart transplantation. Clin Transplant. 2011 Jan-Feb;25(1):E61-7.
- Kobashigawa JA, Laks H, Wu G, Patel J, Moriguchi J, Ha milton M, Fonarow G, Fishbein M, Ardehali A. The University of California at Los Angeles heart transplantation experience. Clinical Transplant 2005;173-85.
- Whiting D, Ardehali, A. Animal Models for Xenotransplantation. Handbook of Laboratory Animal Science, Second Edition: Animal Models, Volume II, 2003
- Ardehali A, Laks H, Fyfe AI. Gene transfer and intrathoracic transplantation, in Cooper DKC (ed): Transplantation and Replacement of Thoracic Organs, Second Edition, 1996

== See also ==
- List of Iranian Americans
