= Saba Hamedy =

American journalist

- Occupation: National news desk editor at CNN

Saba Hamedy (Persian: صبا حامدی) is the Trending News Editor for NBC News Digital. She previously worked as a national news editor for CNN Digital and co-author of The Point newsletter and as a breaking news reporter for CNN Politics.

She also worked at HuffPost as a news assignment editor based out of Los Angeles, and at Mashable as an entertainment reporter. Her first job was at the Los Angeles Times, where she wrote about the Iranian community, national news, and the business of Hollywood and digital entertainment, including TV and the box office. She is an avid TV and movie watcher.

She was editor-in-chief of “The Daily Free Press” while at Boston University. She had also been editorial intern for the Christian Science Monitor and The Arizona Republic.

== Education ==
- Santa Monica High School, Santa Monica High School, diploma, 2009
- Boston University, Boston, Massachusetts, B.S. in journalism and B.A. in political science, 2013
