= Hajar Yazdiha =

American sociologist

- Born: 1983 (age 42–43); Berlin, Germany
- Education: University of Virginia; Brooklyn College; University of North Carolina at Chapel Hill
- Occupation: Sociologist
- Employer: University of Southern California
- Notable work: The Struggle for the People's King
- Website: hajaryazdiha.com

Hajar Yazdiha (born 1983) is an American sociologist focusing on the politics of inclusion and exclusion with regard to ethno-racial identities. She is the author of the 2023 book, The Struggle for the People's King: How Politics Transforms the Memory of the Civil Rights Movement.

== Early life and education ==
Yazdiha was born in Berlin to refugees from Iran. She grew up in Northern Virginia. She was inspired by a high school AP English teacher who wrote her a note saying, "You are one of a handful of true academics. Speak up and use your voice."

Yazdiha enrolled in the University of Virginia, graduating with a bachelor's degree in English in 2005. She was particularly interested in the work of Black writers, including W.E.B. du Bois, James Baldwin, and Audre Lorde.

After spending six years in New York City, Yazdiha graduated from Brooklyn College with a master's degree in sociology. She continued to study sociology at the University of North Carolina at Chapel Hill, earning a master's degree in 2013 and a doctorate in 2017.

== Career ==
Yazdiha is assistant professor of sociology at the University of Southern California. She is affiliated with the school's Equity Research Institute.

In May 2023, Yazdiha published her first book, The Struggle for the People's King: How Politics Transforms the Memory of the Civil Rights Movement, which explores how the words of Martin Luther King Jr. have been co-opted and sanitized. She was first inspired to write the book when reading coverage of the Abigail Fisher case against the University of Texas at Austin, in which she saw the words of King "were being misappropriated to claim affirmative action was anti-white racism."

In addition to her articles in academic journals, Yazdiha has written editorials about King, civil rights, and related subjects for a number of publications, including The Conversation, The Hill, the Los Angeles Times, and Time.

== Selected publications ==
- Yazdiha, Hajar (2023). The Struggle for the People's King: How Politics Transforms the Memory of the Civil Rights Movement. Princeton University Press. ISBN 9780691246475.
- Yazdiha, Hajar (2023). "The relational dynamics of racialised policing: community policing for counterterrorism, suspect communities, and Muslim Americans' provisional belonging". Journal of Ethnic and Migration Studies. 49 (11): 2676–2697. doi:10.1080/1369183X.2023.2193674.
- Yazdiha, Hajar (2022). "Racialized Organizations in Racialized Space: How Socio-spatial Divisions Activate Symbolic Boundaries in a Charter School and a Public School". Sociology of Race and Ethnicity. 8 (4): 468–482. doi:10.1177/23326492221114811.
- Yazdiha, Hajar; Boen, Courtney (2022). "It's a stomachache filled with stress": Tracing the Uneven Spillover Effects of Racialized Police Violence Using Twitter Data". Currents: Journal of Diversity Scholarship for Social Change. 2 (1): 81–87. doi:10.3998/ncidcurrents.1780. PMC 9133729. PMID 35647582.
- Yazdiha, Hajar (2021). "Toward a Du Boisian Framework of Immigrant Incorporation: Racialized Contexts, Relational Identities, and Muslim American Collective Action". Social Problems. 68 (2): 300–320. doi:10.1093/socpro/spaa058.
- Yazdiha, Hajar (2020). "All the Muslims Fit to Print: Racial Frames as Mechanisms of Muslim Ethnoracial Formation in the New York Times from 1992 to 2010". Sociology of Race and Ethnicity. 6 (4): 501–516. doi:10.1177/2332649220903747.
- Kurzman, Charles; Kamal, Ahsan; Yazdiha, Hajar (2017). "Ideology and Threat Assessment: Law Enforcement Evaluation of Muslim and Right-Wing Extremism". Socius. 3. doi:10.1177/2378023117704771.

== Selected honors and recognition ==
- 2023 — CIFAR Azrieli Global Scholar
- 2022 — Louis Wirth Best Article Award, Section on International Migration, American Sociological Association
- 2022 — Ford Foundation postdoctoral fellowship
