= Joe Youssefi =

Iranian-American aerospace engineer and philatelist (1943-2018)

Joe Youssefi in 2016

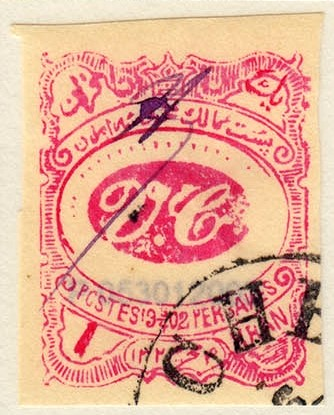
A 1902 Meched postmaster provisional stamp from Youssefi's collection

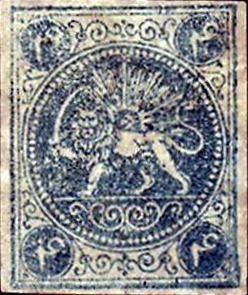
1868 4 shahis "Lion" stamp of Persia (not from Youssefi's collection)

Khosrow "Joe" Hadi Youssefi (July 28, 1943 – August 27, 2018) was an Iranian-American aerospace engineer and philatelist. He left Iran at the age of 17 to study and subsequently acquired two degrees in engineering from the University of Nebraska. He spent the rest of his life in the United States working at Sperry Flight Systems (later Honeywell) until his retirement in 2001. His hobby was philately in which he formed award-winning collections of the stamps of Persia and Iran.

== Early life and family ==
Youssefi was born in Tehran, Iran, on July 28, 1943. He traveled to the United States in 1960 to attend the University of Nebraska from where he graduated with bachelor's and master's degrees in electrical engineering. It was at university that Youssefi met his future wife Carol Sue Hall whom he married in 1964. They had children David and Sarah.

== Career ==
In 1965, Youssefi moved to Phoenix, Arizona, to work for Sperry Flight Systems, later Honeywell Flight Systems, where he stayed until his retirement in 2001. He had an interest in wind shear science, attending and contributing to conferences on the subject hosted by NASA and the Federal Aviation Administration.

== Philately ==
Youssefi formed leading collections of the stamps of Persia and Iran which earned him a gold medal and the Collector's Club of Chicago Award at Chicagopex 2015, and a posthumous gold medal for his display of "Classic Persia" at the World Stamp Exhibition at Bangkok, Thailand, in 2018. He specialised in the 1902 Meched postmaster provisional issue of Persia created by Victor Castaigne when there was a shortage of official stamps, before moving on to the "Lion" issues. Part of Youssefi's collection of the Meched issues may be viewed at the Museum of Philately.

== Death ==
Youssefi died at Show Low, Arizona, on August 27, 2018. His stamps were sold by David Feldman SA in a series of auctions beginning in 2019.
