= Hassan Chitsaz =

Iranian boxer (born 1957)

Hassan Chitsaz (born November 28, 1957, in Tehran, Iran) is an Iranian-American who is the world's oldest active and licensed professional boxer mixed martial artist. Nicknamed 'The Iranian Assassin', Chitsaz, a bodyguard to celebrities, was trained in boxing by former World Heavyweight champion Ken Norton in Los Angeles, California.

== First and second careers in boxing ==
Chitsaz, the oldest of six brothers and sisters, and the Iranian amateur middleweight boxing champion, came to the United States after the Iranian Revolution in 1979 as a foreign student at Clark College in Vancouver, Washington, and never returned to Iran, never realizing his dream of competing for Iran with the chance of winning an Olympic medal in boxing. After becoming an American citizen, in 1993 at age 36 Chitsaz turned professional at heavyweight and won three fights, including one on a Tommy Morrison card before retiring in the same year. Chitsaz returned to the ring in 2008 at age 49 and has won 24 of 25 fights since, with an overall record of 27 wins and one loss, with all 27 of his wins coming by way of knockout. Chitsaz has held the WBC Latino, WBC Mundo Hispano, WBA NABA and WBA Fedecaribe heavyweight regional belts. Chitsaz also served as a sparring partner for heavyweight Lionel Butler. Chitsaz remains licensed in pro boxing and MMA in the state of California and in Mexico. In 2008, he was named an ambassador by the World Boxing Hall of Fame.

== Life as a bodyguard of the stars ==
A graduate of Newport University in Physical Education, and Irvine Valley College with a degree in business management, Chitsaz works as a professional bodyguard to the stars, protecting such high-profile clients as Michael Jackson who he knew, Frank Sinatra, Stevie Wonder, Jerry Lewis, Patrice Rushen, Jon Gibson, Sheena Easton, and Danny Glover.
