= G. A. Mansoori =

Iranian-American Scientist

G.Ali Mansoori
- Born: October 8, 1940 (age 86); Naragh
- Citizenship: American-Iranian
- Education: University of Oklahoma
- Known for: Research within thermodynamics, Statistical mechanics, energy and nanotechnology
- Scientific career
- Workplaces: University of Illinois at Chicago
- Doctoral advisor: Prof. Frank Canfield

Gholam-Ali Mansoori (born in 1940), G. Ali Mansoori also known as "GA Mansoori" is an Iranian-American scientist known for his research within energy, nanoscience, nanotechnology, statistical mechanics and thermodynamics. He is a professor-emeritus at the Departments of Bioengineering, Chemical Engineering and also Physics at University of Illinois at Chicago.

== Life and education ==
Mansoori completed his BSc at the University of Tehran (summa cum laude) in 1963; MSc at the University of Minnesota in 1966; PhD at the University of Oklahoma in 1969 with a dissertation on "A Variational Approach to the Equilibrium Thermodynamic Properties of Simple Liquids and Phase Transitions". Mansoori did post-doctoral work at Rice University under supervision of Thomas W. Leland Jr., all degrees in chemical engineering

== Career ==
Mansoori contributed to over 600 publications including ten books, some of which became text-book references in energy, nanotechnology, statistical echanics and thermodynamics. The most cited work he has co-authored is "Equilibrium thermodynamic properties of the mixture of hard spheres" in The Journal of Chemical Physics in 1971 with about 3000 citations as of January 2024.
