= Neda Moridpour =

Kurdish-Iranian artist

Neda Moridpour is an artist, educator and organizer who is the co-founder of two artist-activist collaboratives, Louder Than Words (with S.A. Bachman) and [P]Art Collective (with Pouya Afshar.)

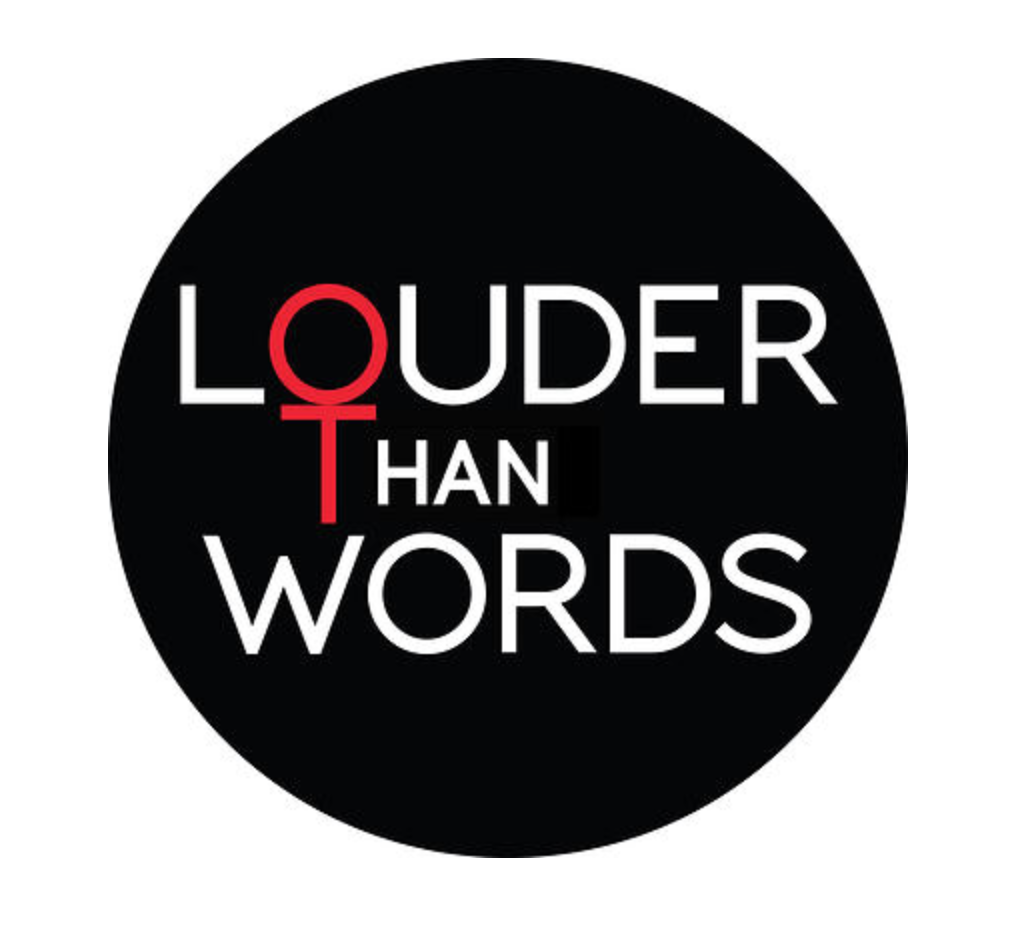
LOUDER THAN WORDS (S.A. Bachman+Neda Moridpour)

Moridpour's work investigates cycles of violence that leads to dislocation, gender, and racial inequity while establishing dialogue and attempting to mobilize communities.

"Louder Than Words" received the 2014 Women's Caucus for Art International Honor Roll award. [P]Art Collective won the 1st prize in the Farhang Foundation Short Film Festival. Her work has been exhibited in the U.S., Iran, and China and is in the collection of the Los Angeles County Museum of Art, The Center for the Study of Political Graphics, and was recently exhibited in the Islamic Art Now II: Contemporary Art of the Middle East at the L.A. County Museum of Art (LACMA.)

Moridpour holds an MFA in Public Practice from Otis College of Art and Design

== Career ==
- Professor of the Practice, Media Arts Department, School of the Museum of Fine Arts at Tufts University, 2018–present
- Visiting Full-Time Faculty, Print, Paper and Graphic Arts Department, School of the Museum of Fine Arts at Tufts University 2015-2018
- Part-Time Faculty, Department of Art and Design, UMASS Lowell, MA, USA, 2015

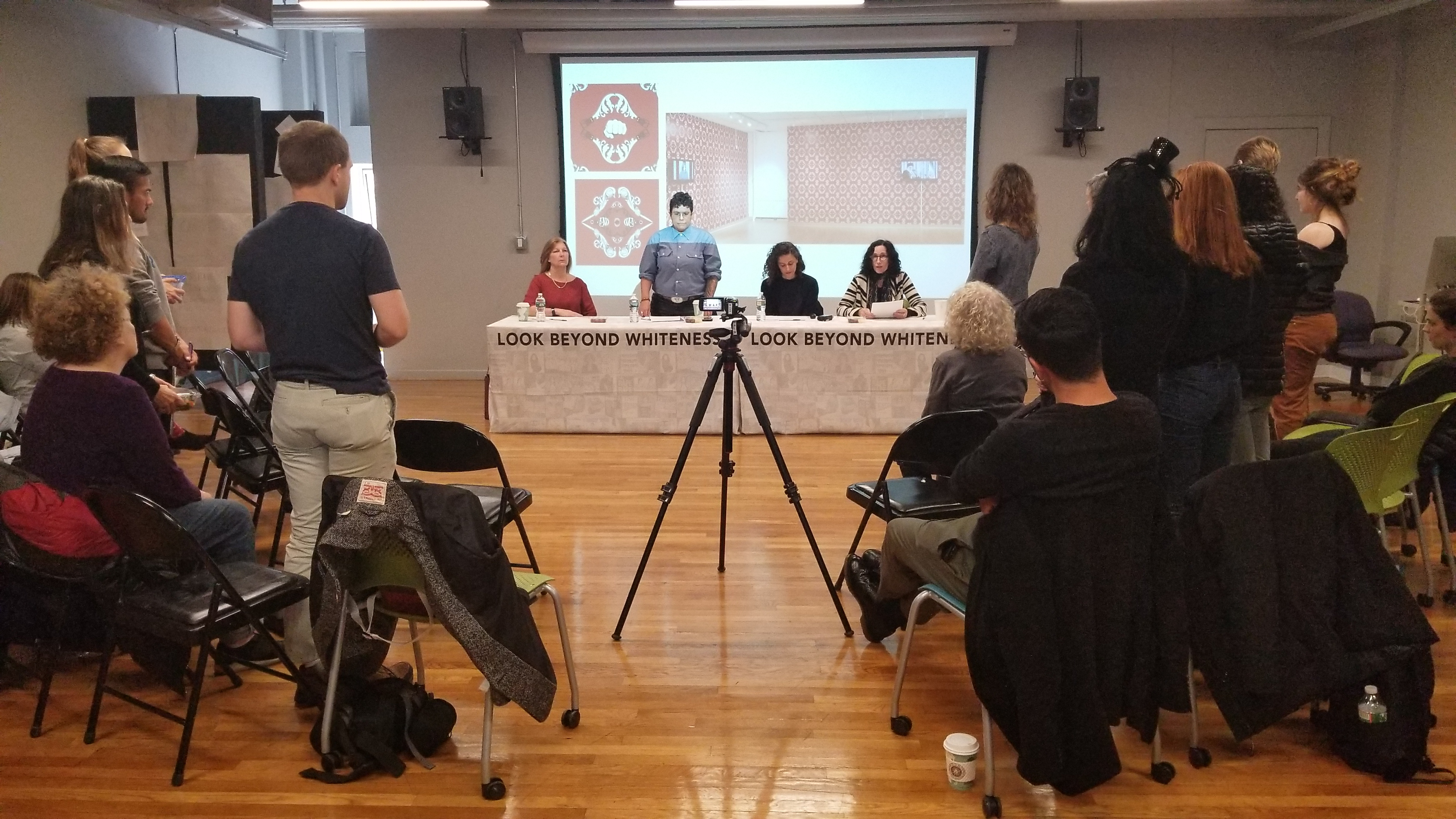
For Freedoms Town Hall: #MeToo and Substantive Structural Change
