= Le Roy Benjamin =

Le Roy Benjamin (1917–1997) was the sculptor and manipulator of the marionettes as well as the voice impersonator for a vaudeville and television act called the Le Roy Brothers Marionettes.

== Early life ==
Le Roy was born in Chicago to father Solomon and mother Minnie or "Mae". His father was of Iranian descent and his mother of Polish descent. Etta Benjamin (1924–2009) was his wife, his business partner, his stage audio and lighting expert, and a fellow accomplished modern artist. She was born in St. Louis to Ida and Nat Perkins who come from Polish/Russian descent.

At fourteen years old, Le Roy began working at an ice cream shop during the Depression to help his family. He always liked to work with hands. He began performing his own puppet shows for children in a Chicago candy shop. His first stage act experience began in 1939 at the New York World's Fair when he helped a marionette act. Then he went on the road with his own marionette act.

== Le Roy Brothers Marionettes ==
His Le Roy Brothers Marionette act required two people on the stage to manipulate the marionettes, initially included his brother, Melvin Benjamin, as the other marionettist and later his brother in-law, Earl Perkins, who replaced Melvin. He married his wife, Etta Perkins in 1946, who managed the behind-the-scenes audio and lights production.

The Le Roy Brothers Marionettes (1939–1955) was one of the most celebrated and requested vaudeville acts in America, showcasing the top vaudeville stars. The marionettes which astounded audiences in disbelief included lifelike comedians and actors: humorous Danny Thomas, Jimmy Durante performing with piano, Dean Martin & Jerry Lewis, and drummer Gene Krupa whose drums would explode from being played with .38 caliber blanks going off. Amongst other beloved characters were the original woman on the moon, breakaway detaching fluorescent skeletons and jitterbug dancers, and a clown blowing up balloons. They would often break the "third wall" and bring the marionettes into the audience as part of their unique routine.

The Le Roy Brothers Marionettes performed at all of the popular state of the art theatres of their time including Chez Paree, 5100 Club, Club Royale, Club Carnival, Roxy Theatre New York, RKO Palace Theatre, the Olympia, and The Normandie Roof. Their act opened for Danny Thomas, Rosemary Clooney, amongst others; while Joan Blondell occasionally participated with the marionette routine. Not very many vaudeville acts made the transition from live stage to television. The Le Roy Brothers Marionettes was one of the acts that did from television's "The Toast of the Town" (aka: The Ed Sullivan Show) Season 2 Episode 47 aired on August 6, 1950, had their own network TV show "Sandy Strong" sponsored by Ovaltine, and was on "The Mickey Mouse Club" Season 1 in 1955 With the transition to TV, some vaudeville performers became even more popular to become household names and segue onward to film. Those performers include Danny Thomas, Jimmy Durante, Rosemary Clooney, Dean Martin & Jerry Lewis; the very same people who were perhaps first immortalized by the Le Roy Brothers Marionettes.

Danny Thomas and Le Roy created the closest relationship. In the early years, when Danny was in vaudeville as a stand-up comedian, Danny would always ask Le Roy to be his opening act. Le Roy opened for Danny for two years in a row at the Chez Paree in Chicago. Then Danny went on to be a famous television actor/producer. Later, he founded the St. Jude Children's Research Hospital. Every time at the hospital's annual fundraising event, Danny would immediately seek out Le Roy in the audience as a true testament to their enduring friendship that lasted decades. Danny wrote a musical interlude about Le Roy's act singing "I'm just a marionette tied to the strings of your heart". Le Roy also fostered close friendships with Broadway/TV actor Jack Soo and singer Nat King Cole and amongst others.

The most respectable agent would often reach out to Le Roy to pitch new projects. Reporters of that time stated the Le Roy Brother Marionettes performance was "the best marionette act in show business".

== Later life ==
After vaudeville, LeRoy and Etta, along with her brother Earl L. Perkins continued their creative entrepreneurial success as a framing and fine art business called the Hillside House of Originals, and then they leased out their production space to BET (Black Entertainment Television) for several years.
