= Soraya Serajeddini =

Kurdish-Iranian human rights activist

- Born: March 23, 1960; Tehran, Imperial State of Iran
- Died: July 24, 2006 (aged 46); Millersville, Maryland
- Education: San Francisco State University; Northeastern University, Boston

Soraya Serajeddini (March 23, 1960 – July 24, 2006), was a Kurdish-Iranian human rights activist. She was born in Tehran to a respected family of Naqshbandi Sufis. Her family fled Iran in 1980 and sought refuge in Sulaimaniya and Baghdad for two years, and then moved to the United States in 1982. She attended San Francisco State University and Northeastern University, and received her BS degree in electrical engineering in 1987.

== Life ==
She joined the Kurdish National Congress (KNC) in 1991 and was instrumental in publicizing Kurdish issues in the United States. Her last post was the Executive Vice President of the Kurdish National Congress of North America.

She organized a conference on the independence of Kurdistan in November 2005 in Iraqi Kurdistan. In March 2005, she and her husband (Thomas Ver Ploeg) were elected to the board of directors of KNC. In January 2006, she chaired the committee on Democracy and Freedom for All Iranians and Kurdish Human & National Rights and through her efforts the first conference of the committee was held in the US Senate building. She was also a moderator of a conference organized by The Kurdish Front for Promoting Democracy and Freedom in Syria in Washington in 2006. She died due to an asthma attack on July 24, 2006, in Millersville, Maryland. She is survived by her husband Tom Ver Ploeg and two sons, Aveen and Daryan.

== Early life ==
Soraya was born on March 23, 1960, in Tehran, Iran to parents Abed Serajeddini and Zayneb Setoodeh. Dr. Abed Serajeddini was a well-respected political, artistic, and intellectual figure in Iran, while Zayneb was a member of the prominent Setoodeh family from the city of Senendaj.

She grew up spending nine months per year in Tehran, and then spending summers in rural Kurdistan. This mix of urban and rural upbringing meant that she developed an early understanding of the rural and mountainous life that many Kurds live. This stood in stark contrast to the situations presented to her by her close relationship with her father, whose many dealings with important officials meant that Soraya had the opportunity to meet foreign dignitaries, government officials, and artists from a very early age.

Her parents were also considered to be liberal for their time and culture. They would encourage philosophical and intellectual discussion at the dinner table, and Soraya in particular loved these conversations. Soraya was always close to her father, and was the only child who would go up into his private study to read books and satisfy her love for learning. According to her sister Shawnem, she always expressed strong willpower and an urge to inform herself on all issues.

Both parents were very supportive and passionate about the education of their children. They decided to send Soraya and her siblings to an Armenian Christian school so that they could receive a more secular education, which at the time was a controversial act among their extended family. Dr. Abed was religious, but never imposed his faith upon anyone that he encountered. Both parents together, through exposure to both high political and artistic culture as well as rural summers in farming communities, strived to make sure that their children were graceful and confident in their interaction with any type of person. Soraya's mother once said, after hearing Soraya excitedly describe her meeting the daughter of a sheikh, that she should “be in awe of no one” because every person deserves respect equally, herself included.

With this background and education, Soraya became politically active as a 17 year old in Tehran where she was involved in anti-shah movements as part of a quickly destabilizing Iran. Her parents were worried about this political affiliation, since protesting the government at this time was considered dangerous. It soon became clear that the government was building a case on Soraya.

In the coming years, the situation would turn dangerous for the Nakshbandis, and for Soraya's family in particular. In 1977 the Iranian prime minister, fearing the inevitable revolution, warned the Serajeddinis that the new government, led by Ayatollah Khomeini, was watching them, and that protection was not guaranteed to their family in the case of revolution. Soraya and her family, faced with the possibility of persecution or worse as enemies of a new, oppressive state, began their plans for a stealthy exit from Iran.

Soraya fled Iran in 1980 traveling overland to Sulaymaniyah, Iraq. She spent the next two years in various parts of Iraq, including Baghdad and Sulaymaniyah. During this time, Soraya began to understand the reality of the Kurdish condition in Iran, Iraq, Syria, and Turkey. This perspective, combined with the ambition and intelligence nurtured in her childhood, would become the foundation for her later career as an advocate for the Kurdish people.

== Arrival to the USA ==
Soraya was the first of her immediate family to leave Iraq and pursue an education in the West. She decided to move to San Francisco due to the amount of her extended family that was already living there. She moved there in 1982 to attend San Francisco State University where she lived for two years before transferring to Northeastern University of Boston in 1984, where in 1987 she graduated with a BS in electrical engineering. Her mother is quoted as saying, upon Soraya's graduation, that “now that you have a trade, you can begin your education”.

During her time in San Francisco, she met Thomas Ver Ploeg. The two of them moved to Boston together, and were married in September 1987. Both of Soraya's parents insisted that she finish her education regardless of marital status, and also urged Thomas to travel to Istanbul to seek a blessing for the marriage from Sheikh Osman, which he did by himself shortly before their wedding.

Once married, Thomas and Soraya spent several years in Boston before moving back to California in 1990, this time to the city of San Jose. Their first son, Aveen, was born on October 12, 1994. Their second son, Daryan, was born on July 11, 1996. The family lived in San Jose until 2004 when they moved to a home in Maryland, close to Washington, D.C., for political proximity.

== Political Career and the KNC ==
Since she was 17, Soraya had been involved in political movements whenever they defended human rights. After experiencing the trauma of her family escaping prosecution in Iran, she began to understand the need for advocacy on behalf of the Kurds. In 1988, Saddam Hussein massacred the Kurdish village of Halabja, using chemical weapons to kill more than 5,000 civilians, including at least 30 of Soraya's relatives. Their only crime, according to Soraya, was “being born with the curse of Kurdish identity”. Having spent her entire life watching the persecution and marginalization of her people, Soraya and Thomas began their lives as advocates by attending the Kurdish National Congress beginning in 1990.

Initially, both of them held relatively low-profile positions within the KNC, as Soraya did not want to draw unnecessary (and possibly dangerous) attention to herself or her family. However, both Thomas and Soraya began to become more involved in the early 2000s and by the time of her death Soraya served as the Executive Vice President of the organization.

During this period of time, Soraya also became a more vocal advocate for her cause, often appearing on television news and other outlets as a speaker. By 2002, she was frequently meeting with various media sources to discuss Kurdish matters. She was known as an extremely eloquent speaker who would leave an impression on any audience, and so was often picked as a spokesperson for various KNC functions.

In November 2005, Soraya traveled to Kurdistan of Iraq in order to chair a conference on the topic of Kurdish independence. She served as vice chair for the 4 day conference in which the North American KNC met with local politicians to discuss prospects for an independent Kurdistan. Then, in January 2006, she contributed to the creation of a committee entitled “Democracy and Freedom for All Iranian and Kurdish Human and National Rights”. Due to her efforts, this committee was able to hold its first meeting in the US Congress building. In March 2006, she was instrumental in organizing a conference entitled “Democracy and Freedom in Syria and Syrian Kurdish Human and National Rights”.

== Legacy ==
On the 24th of July 2006, Soraya died suddenly of a severe asthma attack. At the time, the only one present was her sister Shawnem. On the 29th of July both a private, traditionally Islamic service in Falls Church, Virginia, and a memorial service in Millersville, Maryland were held. These services were attended by friends and family from all levels of society, and the procession included taxi drivers alongside presidential families. The funeral was accompanied by worldwide memorials, internet traffic, and Kurdish news coverage while constant phone calls from around the world rang at their Maryland home with messages of sympathy and condolences.

In the words of a colleague of Soraya's, Professor Asad Khalainy, “the departure of Soraya is not only a great loss for her family, KNC, and Kurdish people but also for all peace-loving people, and all those seeking equal rights for women and justice, democracy, human rights, and national rights for all”.

In a biography written by Thomas's sister, she writes that “Soraya’s greatest legacy is found in the love she leaves in the hearts of those whom she loved the most: her friends and her family. Soraya’s quiet generosity to countless persons in countless ways will never be forgotten”.
