= Siamack A. Shirazi =

Siamack A. Shirazi (born in Iran) is an Iranian-American scientist. He is professor and graduate coordinator of mechanical engineering department at the University of Tulsa, OK, USA. He is fellow of ASME and NACE and currently the Director of Erosion/Corrosion Research Center at University of Tulsa, OK, USA.

Dr. Siamack A. Shirazi is very well known in fluid mechanics integrity management worldwide for SPPS software developed by E/CRC at Tulsa University for particle erosion rate prediction. SPPS has been used widely in erosion threat assessment. He has also published more than hundred peer reviewed journal and conference papers. Siamack received his B.S., M.S. and Ph.D. from the University of New Mexico.
