= Manuchehr Shahrokhi =

Manuchehr Shahrokhi is a professor of Global Business-Finance at California State University, Fresno, founding editor of the Global Finance Journal and executive director of the Global Finance Association/Conference. He has authored over 80 published journal articles, proceedings, books, and manuals on finance topics. He was a visiting professor at Harvard University from 1993 to 1999.

Shahrokhi's research interests include international finance, global business strategy, technology transfer, and financial engineering. His book Reverse Licensing: International Technology Transfer to the United States (1987) explores reverse licensing as a strategy for U.S. manufacturing firms.

He has published in major journals including Global Finance Journal, Journal of International Business Studies, Journal of Financial Research, and Journal of Managerial Finance. For example, his article “The evolution and future of the BRICS: Unbundling politics from economics” was published in the GFJ in 2017.

== Selected works ==
- Reverse Licensing: International Technology Transfer to the United States (ISBN 0-275-92258-8)
