= Kamran Sadeghi =

American electronic musician, producer, mix engineer

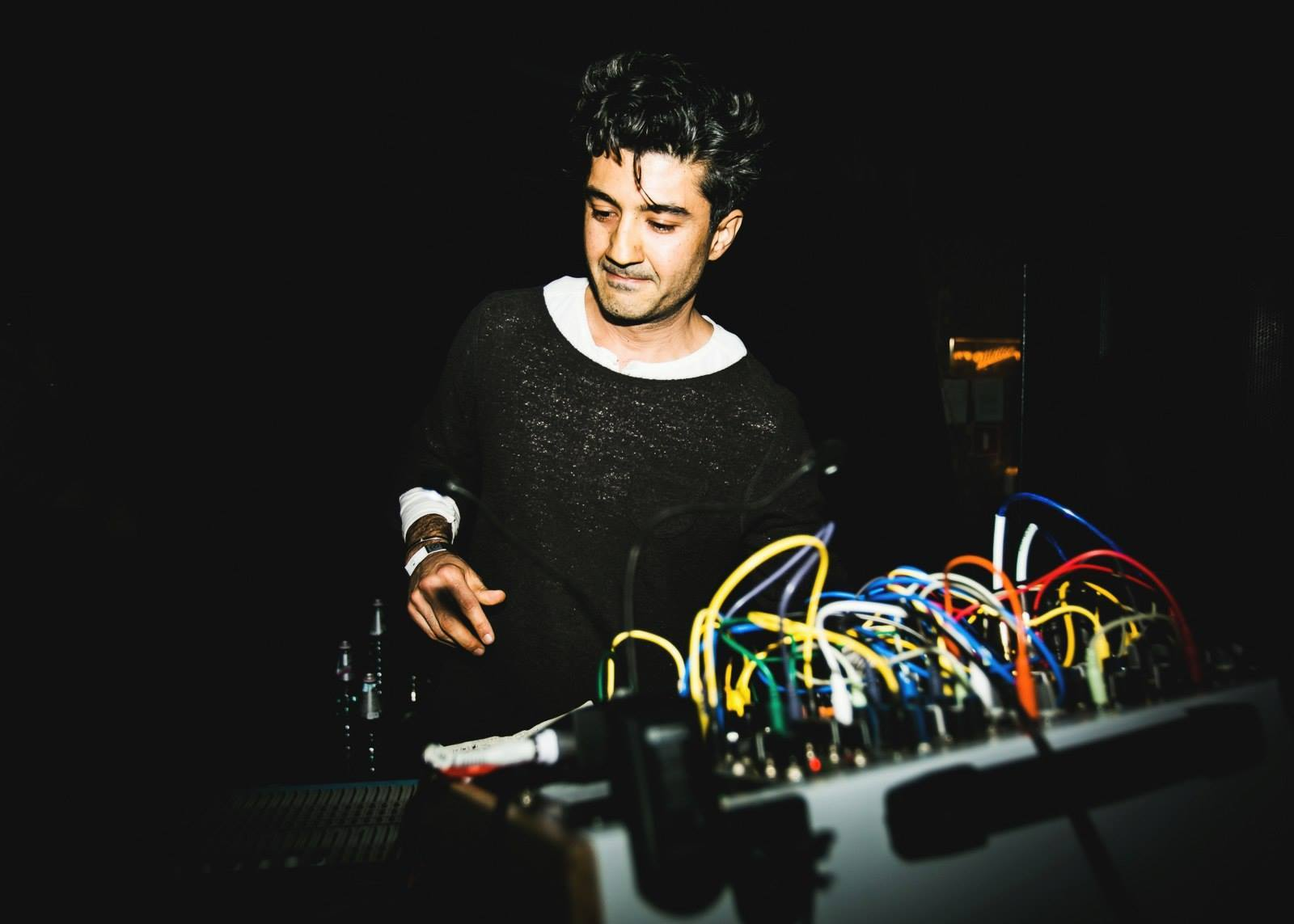
- Kamran Sadeghi performing live in Moscow, Russia

Background information
- Also known as: Son Of Rose
- Born: Kamran Sadeghi
- Genres: Electronica, Electroacoustic, Modern Classical, Ambient, Techno
- Occupations: Music Producer, Musician, Composer
- Instruments: Recording Studio, Modular Synthesizer
- Years active: 2005–present
- Labels: LINE, The Vinyl Factory, Cocoon Recordings, Meander Music, Apollo Records, All Inn Records, Dragon's Eye Recordings, Bella Union, Sacred Bones,
- Website: kamransadeghi.com

Kamran Sadeghi is an Iranian born American electronic musician, producer, mix engineer and composer based in New York City.

== Career ==
Kamran Sadeghi first emerged in 2005 under the alias Son Of Rose, particularly with the 2007 album Divisions In Parallel . In 2020 Kamran worked with artist Zimoun on the album 42:41. He premiered his video art piece Loss Less at the Louvre. Sadeghi's album Loss Less, recorded inside the nuclear cooling tower Satsop, was his debut on the record label LINE, curated by Richard Chartier. He is credited for performing live, producing and mixing the album Killer Road, featuring Patti Smith in 2016 on Sacred Bones Records. Sadeghi is also credited for mixing, co-producing and co-composing What We Leave Behind featuring Jean-Luc Godard Archives released on The Vinyl Factory.
