= Sabzi (artist) =

- Born: Ahvaz, Iran
- Known for: Painter, sculptor
- Movement: Abstract impressionism

Mahmood Sabzi, professionally known as Sabzi, is an Iranian artist known for his abstract impressionist paintings.

Sabzi was born in Ahvaz, Iran. He began painting when he was twelve years old, but eventually earned a bachelor's degree in agricultural engineering at the University of Jundi Shapur.

Initially, Sabzi made realistic paintings inspired by his country's history and culture. He went to exile during the regime of Ruhollah Khomeini, settling in Germany and the United States. During this period, he experimented with figurative and abstract styles. He eventually settled in southern California. Each of his moves was reflected in changes in his style to reflect changes in his environment.

== Inspiration ==
According to Sabzi, he draws inspiration from the Persian rugs created by his mother.

My artistic inspiration, the very basis of form and color for my work, comes from my childhood memories of Persian rugs designed and weaned by my mother. As I watched her for hours creating gorgeous patterns, hues and textures, her fingers dancing across the loom, the designs and shapes of my current work took form. My creations flow from the same source of energy and creativity that inspired my mother.

Sabzi's painting style is influenced by the Modernist works of Paul Cézanne and Henri Matisse, as well as by the poet Rumi. Majority of his works feature women in various moods and poses, implying internal conflict.
