= Ladan Eshkevari =

Iranian-American educator

- Born: Iran
- Education: University of Maryland, Baltimore (BS (Honors) in Nursing) (1990); Columbia University School of Nursing (MS, Anesthesia) (1995); Georgetown University (PhD, Physiology and Biophysics) (2009)
- Occupations: Businesswoman; Academic
- Years active: 1985–present
- Organization: Georgetown University (Professor Emerita)

Ladan Eshkevari is an Iranian-American businesswoman and academic. She is the co-CEO and founder of Avesta Ketamine and Wellness, a clinic specializing in ketamine therapy for mental health and chronic pain.

Eshkevari is a member of the American Association of Nurse Anesthesiology (AANA) and also served as the Editor-In-Chief of its peer-reviewed, bimonthly academic journal, Journal of the American Association of Nurse Anesthesiology. She is a professor emerita at Georgetown University.

== Early life and education ==
Ladan Eshkevari was born in Iran and lived in India during her formative years, attending the British School till the age of 15. She moved to the United States with her family as a teenager.

She holds a BS (Hons.) in Nursing degree from the University of Maryland, Baltimore, an MS in Anesthesia degree from the Columbia University School of Nursing, a PhD in Physiology and Biophysics from Georgetown University, has a Diplomate degree in Traditional Chinese Medicine and Acupuncture from Maryland Institute of Traditional Chinese Medicine and a Certification in Corporate Executive Leadership from Georgetown University.

== Career ==
Eshkevari started her career as a nurse during the AIDS epidemic in the United States.

Since 1995, she has been a member of the American Association of Nurse Anesthesiology (AANA) and was the Editor-In-Chief of its peer-reviewed, bimonthly academic journal, Journal of the American Association of Nurse Anesthesiology (AANA Journal) from 2023 till 2024.

Eshkevari is a professor emerita at Georgetown University and between 1997 and 2022, she has held various positions at Georgetown University, such as a Nurse Anesthetist (1997–2010), an Associate Professor (1997–2022), Professor (2022) and the Program Director of the university's Doctor of Nurse Anesthesia Practice program (2017–2022).

She serves on various national boards in the United States such as the Medicare Evidence Development and Coverage Advisory Committee. She has also served as the President of the District of Columbia Association of Nurse Anesthetists, was co-chair of the Education Committee of the Board of Nursing in the District appointed by Mayor Anthony A. Williams in 2005, and continues to serve on its Advance Practice Advisory Panel. She is a former chair of the American Association of Nurse Anesthesiology Foundation Board of Trustees. Since 2018, Eshkevari has been the Founder and Co-CEO of Avesta Ketamine and Wellness, a group of clinics providing ketamine infusion therapy for conditions such as depression, anxiety, and chronic pain in the Washington metropolitan area. In 2020, Avesta Ketamine and Wellness opened its first standalone clinic in McLean, Virginia. The same year, the company began offering Spravato for its patients at its clinics.

== Research ==
Eshkevari's areas of research include identifying physiologic markers for chronic stress and pain that are modulated by acupuncture, research on different anesthesia-related topics, and clinical research on ketamine's effects as an antidepressant.

Her work on rat models, investigated the effects of acupuncture on the hypothalamic–pituitary–adrenal axis (HPA axis) hormones as markers for chronic stress.

She has also published clinical research on the effectiveness of ketamine as an antidepressant, including the use of adjunct treatments like intravenous glutathione.

== Selected publications ==
=== Journal articles ===
- Acupuncture and pain: a review of the literature (2003)
- Use of acupuncture for chronic pain: Optimizing clinical practice (2005)
- Occurrence and removal of a knotted pulmonary artery catheter: a case report (2007)
- Acupuncture at ST36 prevents chronic stress-induced increases in neuropeptide Y in rat (2012)
- Propofol and Ketamine for Targeted Muscle Reinnervation after Limb Amputation (2013)
- Acupuncture blocks cold stress-induced increases in the hypothalamus pituitary adrenal axis (HPA) in the rat (2013)
- Management of Postpartum Pain (2013)
- Effects of acupuncture, RU-486 on the hypothalamic-pituitary-adrenal axis in chronically stressed adult male rats (2015)
- Impact of COVID-19 Pandemic on Certified Registered Nurse Anesthetist Practice (2021)
- Efficacy of addition of the anti-inflammatory, IV glutathione to standard ketamine IV therapy in major depressive disorder (2024)

=== Books ===
- Pharmacokinetics in Nurse Anesthesia (2005)
- Chapter:Pain management in the parturient published in the book Varney's Midwifery (2013)

== Honors and recognition ==
- Researcher of the Year (2013) – Sigma Theta Tau International Honor Society of Nursing
- John Garde Researcher of the Year award (2014) – American Association of Nurse Anesthesiology (AANA)
- Star Nurse (2020) – Washington Post
- Program Director of the Year Award (2022) – American Association of Nurse Anesthesiology (AANA)
- Fellow – American Academy of Nursing
