= Morvarid Karimi =

Iranian-American medical researcher

- Persian: مروارید کریمی
- Born: September 25, 1971; Isfahan, Imperial State of Iran
- Died: 21 May 2016 (aged 44); Saint Louis, Missouri, US
- Education: University of Münster (MD)
- Spouse(s): Eric Johnson, MD
- Children: 2

Morvarid Karimi (Persian: مروارید کریمی, 25 September 1971 – 21 May 2016) was an Iranian-American medical researcher and clinician. She was an assistant professor of Neurology in the Movement Disorders Section at Washington University School of Medicine in St. Louis, Missouri, USA. Karimi focused her research on neuroimaging of the pathophysiology of movement disorders including Parkinson's disease and dystonia.
