= Pantea Beigi =

Iranian-American Human Rights Advocate

- Born: Tehran, Iran
- Education: University of Queensland
- Occupation: Human rights advocate
- Organizations: PeaceJam Foundation
- Known for: Advocacy for Iranian citizens’ rights; work with Nobel Peace Laureates
- Notable work: Collaboration with Dr. Shirin Ebadi; media updates on the 2009 Green Movement
- Awards: Rotary Peace Fellowship

Pantea Beigi is an Iranian-American human rights advocate, born in Tehran in the aftermath of the 1979 Iranian Revolution and during the 1980s Iran–Iraq War. Beigi has served as an AmeriCorps member for the PeaceJam Foundation, where she worked with a number of Nobel Peace Laureates to address conditions of social and economic injustice faced by underprivileged youth populations across the globe. She assists 2003 Nobel Peace Laureate, Dr. Shirin Ebadi in her efforts on behalf of the Iranian citizens and helped protect Ebadi and her clients during December 2008's attacks on human rights workers in Iran. In June 2009 shortly after the controversial elections in Iran, Beigi conducted routine interviews on CNN , MSNBC, BBC, NPR, KIRN and other news outlets providing human rights updates regarding what later became known as the "Green Movement" in Iran.

== Early life ==
Beigi holds a bachelor's degree in speech communication with a journalism minor and was a Rotary Peace Fellow at the University of Queensland, Australia, where she obtained her Master of International Studies in Peace and Conflict Resolution.

== See also ==
- Defenders of Human Rights Center
