= Asian Indoor Championships =

Asian Indoor Championships may refer to:

- Asian Indoor Athletics Championships
- Asian Indoor and Martial Arts Games
