= Mehdi Shahbazi =

Mehdi Shahbazi (1942, Kermanshah, Imperial State of Iran – November, 2007, California, USA) was a self-made American business man who emigrated to United States in the 1960s from his native Iran. Over the years, Mr. Shahbazi embraced the American dream and work ethics, and made it a reality in his life, coming to own and operate a few gas station franchises in California.

After having become convinced over the years, especially after the debacle that followed hurricane Katrina, that the major oil companies were in effect conspiring to gouge consumers and artificially raise prices at the pumps, Mr. Shahbazi began a controversial, and ultimately fatal, public protest of the oil majors from his Shell Oil franchise. His method included the prominent posting of signs on his station's grounds that openly declared his views and directed interested customers to "see the cashier" for further information, which included 2 page fliers detailing his views, complaints, and ultimately his concern both for the consumer, and the societal order (which he felt would not withstand the $5 per gallon price that he insisted was the predetermined price set for gas by the majors).

His protest consequently resulted in legal battles with the Shell Oil Company (US), and ultimately his death, at the age of 65, due to the liver failure that apparently resulted from his 4 month liquid fast. He had previously lost his home, and started fasting during the later stages of his battles in the courtroom before losing his business.

"At his former Marina station - where two years ago he posted a sign that read "Consumers' pain is Big Oil's unearned profit!" - customers have erected a memorial of flowers, cards and signs proclaiming love and appreciation. "He was kind, wise and generous beyond imagination," said Jeffrey Cohen, a Salinas physician who met Shahbazi as a patient and remained a friend for 32 years. "I want people to know that he wasn't crazy. He used what he felt was the last non-violent method of protest that he could muster. He was expressing what we all feel."

== Sources ==
- https://www.mercurynews.com/centralcoast/ci_7497707
