= Not Without My Daughter =

Not Without My Daughter may refer to:

- Not Without My Daughter (book), a 1987 book by Betty Mahmoody
- Not Without My Daughter (film), a 1991 adaptation of the book, directed by Brian Gilbert
- "Not Without My Daughter" (Arrested Development), a 2004 television episode
- "Not Without My Daughter" (Related), a 2006 television episode
- "Not Without My Daughter" (The Sarah Silverman Program), a 2007 television episode
