= Mahtab Farid =

- Born: Tehran, Iran
- Occupations: Author, Analyst, Journalist, Global Cultural Fellow, Boren Scholar
- Website: https://servingwithoutauniform.com

Mahtab Farid (Persian: مهتاب فرید; born March 26) is an author, journalist, analyst, public diplomacy strategist and Boren Scholar. Farid is also a 2017–2018 Global Cultural Fellow with Institute of International Cultural Relations. She has over a decade experience working for major international news outlets Fox News Channel, VOA and Radio Free Europe. The U.S. State Department honored Mahtab Farid with "Expeditionary Service Award" for her efforts in public diplomacy in Afghanistan. The award was handed over to Mahtab by Under Secretary Patrick Kennedy on behalf of Secretary Hillary R. Clinton on Tuesday, November 29, 2011 in an official ceremony at the State Department in Washington, DC. The award, signed by Secretary of State Clinton, reads: “In grateful recognition for your committed service in extraordinary and arduous conditions during your field assignment in Afghanistan. In spite of constant danger and difficulty your contributions to reconstruction, stability, and peace reflect great credit on yourself and on the Department of State.”

== Education and career ==
Mahtab Farid was a journalist at Voice of America and Radio Farda. She led training and professional capacity building courses for more than 100 journalists, including females, in eastern and central Afghanistan. Farid told to AFJC she was fortunate to share the American values with Afghans and build a bridge through personal and public diplomacy. “ I owe my service to many of our military colleagues who kept me safe and protected me like an ambassador and my service wouldn't have been possible without the friendship and support of our Afghan friends.” She added.

December 7, 2010: The "US State Department Meritorious Award" for Mahtab Farid from the hand of Karl Eikenberry, US ambassador to Afghanistan for my contributions in public diplomacy. The letter attached to Mahtab Farid's award said, "Her energy and dedication has led to the completion of a series of highly successful projects that have told the Regional Command East story, developed capacity in the Afghan media and fostered civilian- military (Civ-Mil) integration."

Book: Mahtab Farid is the author of Serving Without A Uniform: Reporting Truth in Defense of Freedom

== Awards ==
- November 29, 2011: The US State Department Expeditionary Service Award for Mahtab Farid's efforts in public diplomacy in Afghanistan. She was honored by Under Secretary Patrick Kennedy on behalf of Secretary Hillary R. Clinton in an official ceremony at the State Department.
- December 7, 2010: The US State Department Meritorious Award was presented to Mahtab Farid by U.S. Ambassador to Afghanistan Karl Eikenberry, for contributions to public diplomacy.
