= Foad Manshadi =

American rapper

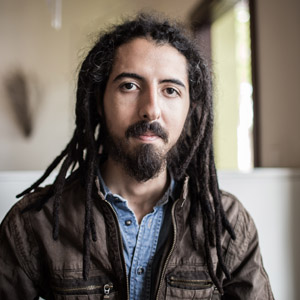
- Born: June 3, 1987 (age 38); Tonekabon, Iran
- Other name: Foad Manshadi
- Years active: 2005–present

Foad Manshadi (born June 3, 1987) or simply Foad, is an American entrepreneur, recording artist, musician, blogger, and social activist residing in Los Angeles. Foad uses his music as a forum for bringing light to social justice issues, including poverty, sexism, homophobia, and theocracy. His music serves as a forum for his feelings and ideas and is inspired by world music. Foad has practiced vegetarianism since his youth.

== Early life ==
Foad was born on June 3, 1987, in Tonekabon, Iran to a Baha'i family. Because of his family's faith, he was discriminated against and expelled from school in his town. At the age of 16, he fled Iran to Turkey and then the United States in response to governmental oppression. His experiences with religious oppression in Iran have inspired his passion towards promotion of truth, justice, and freedom. Now he resides in California, United States.

== Music career ==
Foad began his journey with music by learning to play the Setar, despite the fact that learning an instrument was very difficult due to the prohibition of carrying musical instruments in small towns. Nevertheless, Foad persevered in learning. After migrating to the US, Foad began writing rap songs in Persian about his experiences with oppression, religion, and politics. His first rap song, "Matrood" (Rejected) which is also known as "Mazhab" (Religion), was released in 2006; later he released his first hip-hop album entitled "Enghelab Fekri" (Intellectual Revolution) in May 2008. Since the release of Enghelab Fekri, Foad has continued to produce and release many singles and feature tracks. His music has gained popularity and exposure through many popular sites worldwide, including Mideastunes and NPR. Also Foad was featured for the soundtrack of FX TV drama Sons of Anarchy.

== Social Activities ==
Foad is an outspoken advocate for the freedom of prisoners of consciousness in Iran and champions both religious and political freedom as well as freedom of speech. Foad is also against capital punishment and pro-women's rights; his song "Sangsar" (Stoning) deals with both issues.
