= Zabihollah Rezaee =

Iranian academic

- Born: 1954 (age 71–72); Shahreza, Isfahan, Iran
- Education: Tarleton State University and the University of Mississippi
- Scientific career
- Fields: Accountancy, Auditing, Corporate Governance, Ethics, Fraud
- Workplaces: The Thompson-Hill Chair of Excellence and Professor of Accountancy at the University of Memphis

Zabihollah Rezaee (Persian: ذبیح الله رضایی) (born 1954) is an Iranian-born/American accountant, the Thompson-Hill Chair of Excellence and Professor of Accounting at the University of Memphis, USA.

== Life and work ==
Rezaee obtained his BS in accounting at the N.I.O.C. School of Accounting and Finance in Iran, his MBA from Tarleton State University and his Ph.D. in accounting at the University of Mississippi.

He served two years on the Standing Advisory Group of the Public Company Accounting Oversight Board.

== Selected publications ==
- Financial Institutions, Valuations, Mergers, and Acquisitions: The Fair Value Approach
- Financial Statement Fraud: Prevention and Detection
- U.S. Master Auditing Guide (3rd edition)
- Audit Committee Oversight Effectiveness Post-Sarbanes-Oxley Act;
- Corporate Governance Post-Sarbanes-Oxley: Regulations, Requirements, and Integrated Processes
- Corporate Governance and Business Ethics
- Financial Services Firms: Governance, regulations, Valuations, Mergers and Acquisitions
- Corporate Sustainability: Integrating Performance and Reporting
- "Chapter 2: IRAN" (Gholam Hossein Davani and Zabihollah Rezaee) in A Global History of Accounting, Financial Reporting and Public Policy, edited by Gary John Previts, Peter J. Walton, P. W. Wolnizer, Emerald Group Publishing Limited (July 17, 2012)

== Controversy ==
Rezaee was investigated and found guilty of plagiarizing a colleague during his employment at Middle Tennessee State University.
