= Hadieh Shafie =

Iranian-American visual artist

- Born: 1969 (age 56–57); Tehran, Iran
- Education: Pratt Institute; University of Maryland, Baltimore County; University of Maryland, College Park

Hadieh Shafie (born 1969) is an Iranian-American visual artist based in Brooklyn, New York.

== Biography ==
She was born in Tehran, Iran, and migrated to the United States in 1983. She has a BA in Painting from University of Maryland, College Park (1993), an MFA in painting from the Pratt Institute (1999) and an MFA in Imaging and Digital Art from the University of Maryland, Baltimore County (2004).

Many of her works comprise tightly coiled strips of brightly coloured paper, bearing calligraphy, arranged in patterns: she has described them as "part sculpture, part drawing, part artist’s book".

Her works are held, among others, by the British Museum, Metropolitan Museum of Art, Victoria and Albert Museum, Los Angeles County Museum of Art (LACMA) Sheldon Museum of Art and the United States State Department.

Shafie held a solo exhibition, "Surfaced", in New York's Leila Heller Gallery in March and April 2015.
