= Armen Der Kiureghian =

Iranian engineer and university administrator

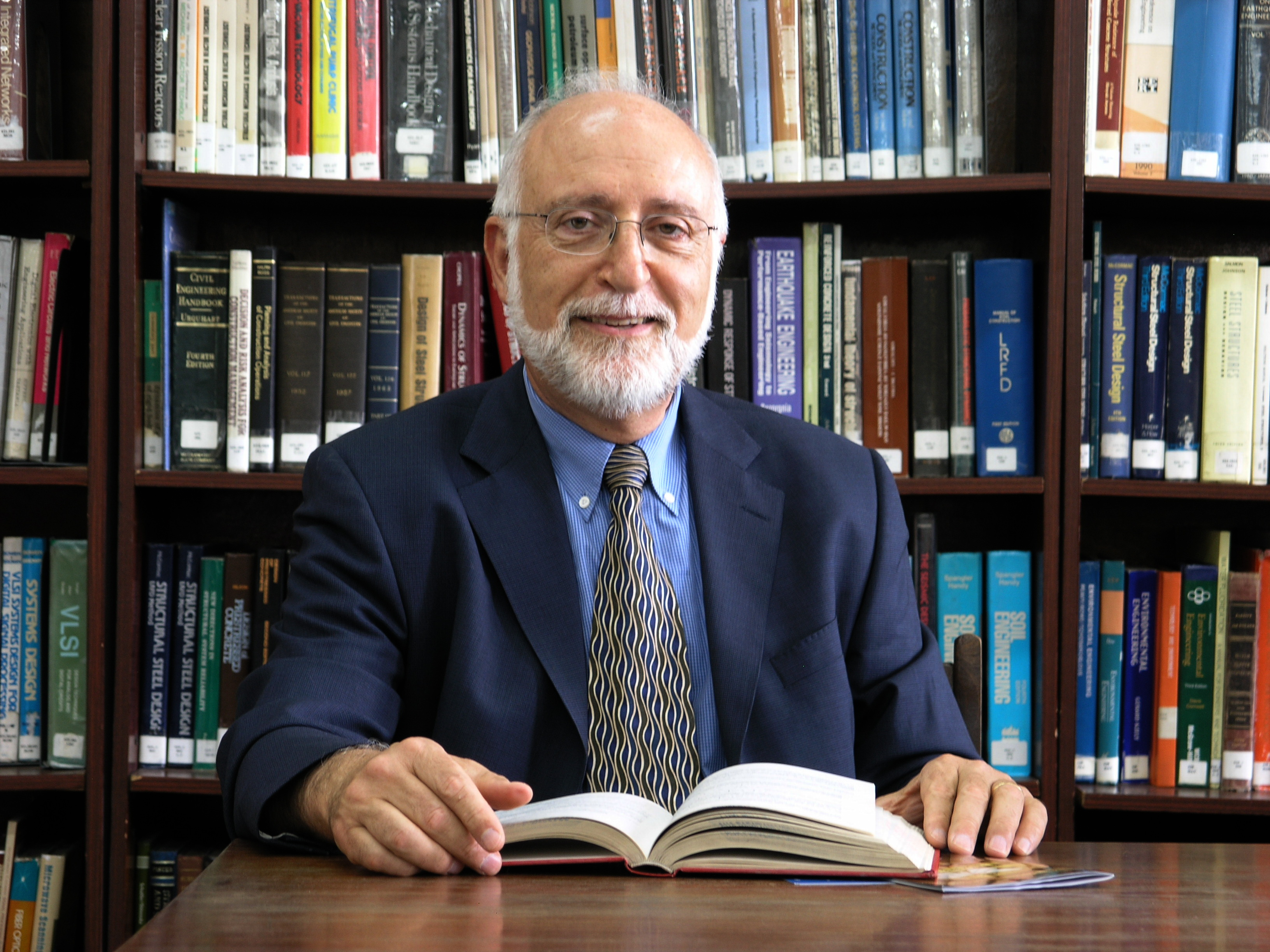
- Born: October 4, 1947 (age 78); Isfahan, Iran
- Education: University of Tehran; University of Illinois at Urbana-Champaign
- Known for: Structural and system reliability, risk analysis, stochastic structural dynamics, earthquake engineering
- Spouse: Nelly Ouzounian (m. 1983)
- Children: Naira, Sebouh
- Scientific career
- Workplaces: University of California AUA president (2014)
- Website: Official page

Armen Der Kiureghian (Armenian: Արմէն Տէր-Կիւրեղեան, born October 4, 1947) is an Iranian-born Armenian-American academic, one of the founders of the American University of Armenia, where he served as the president from 2014 to 2019.

He is the professor of civil engineering at the University of California.

Der Kiureghian was elected a member of the US National Academy of Engineering in 2011 for contributions to risk and reliability and earthquake engineering to advance the practice of civil and structural engineering. He is also a Foreign Member of the National Academy of Sciences of Armenia.

== Biography ==
Der Kiureghian was born in Isfahan in the family of a prominent Armenian painter Sumbat Der Kiureghian. He received his BS and MS in civil engineering from the University of Tehran, Iran, and his PhD in structural engineering from the University of Illinois at Urbana-Champaign in 1975. In 1978 he joined the faculty at the University of California at Berkeley, where in 1978–1981 he was as an assistant professor and continued to be an associate professor (1981–1985), professor (1985), vice chair (1990–1993) and chair (1997–2001) of the structural engineering, mechanics and materials program and as vice-chair for instruction in the Department of Civil and Environmental Engineering. Since July 1999, he has held the Taisei Chair in Civil Engineering in the College of Engineering at UC Berkeley.

After the Spitak earthquake of 1988 in Armenia, Der Kiureghian played a leading role in establishing the American University of Armenia in Yerevan as an affiliate of the University of California. He served concurrently as the founding dean of the College of Engineering (1991–2007) and as interim provost (2011–2012) of AUA with his position at Berkeley. He has also served as the founding director of the Engineering Research Center of AUA (1991–2004), a has been a founding member of the board of trustees of AUA. He served as interim university president since President Bruce Boghosian's departure in July 2014. In January, Der Kiureghian has accepted the position of president of AUA. In May 2019, he passed the baton to Dr. Karin Markides.

Armen Der Kiureghian's teaching and research interests are in the areas of structural reliability, risk analysis, random vibrations and earthquake engineering. He has pioneered methods for the safety and reliability assessment of complex structures and for stochastic seismic analysis of buildings, bridges, and critical equipment. He has over 300 publications, including 110 in archival journals and book chapters.

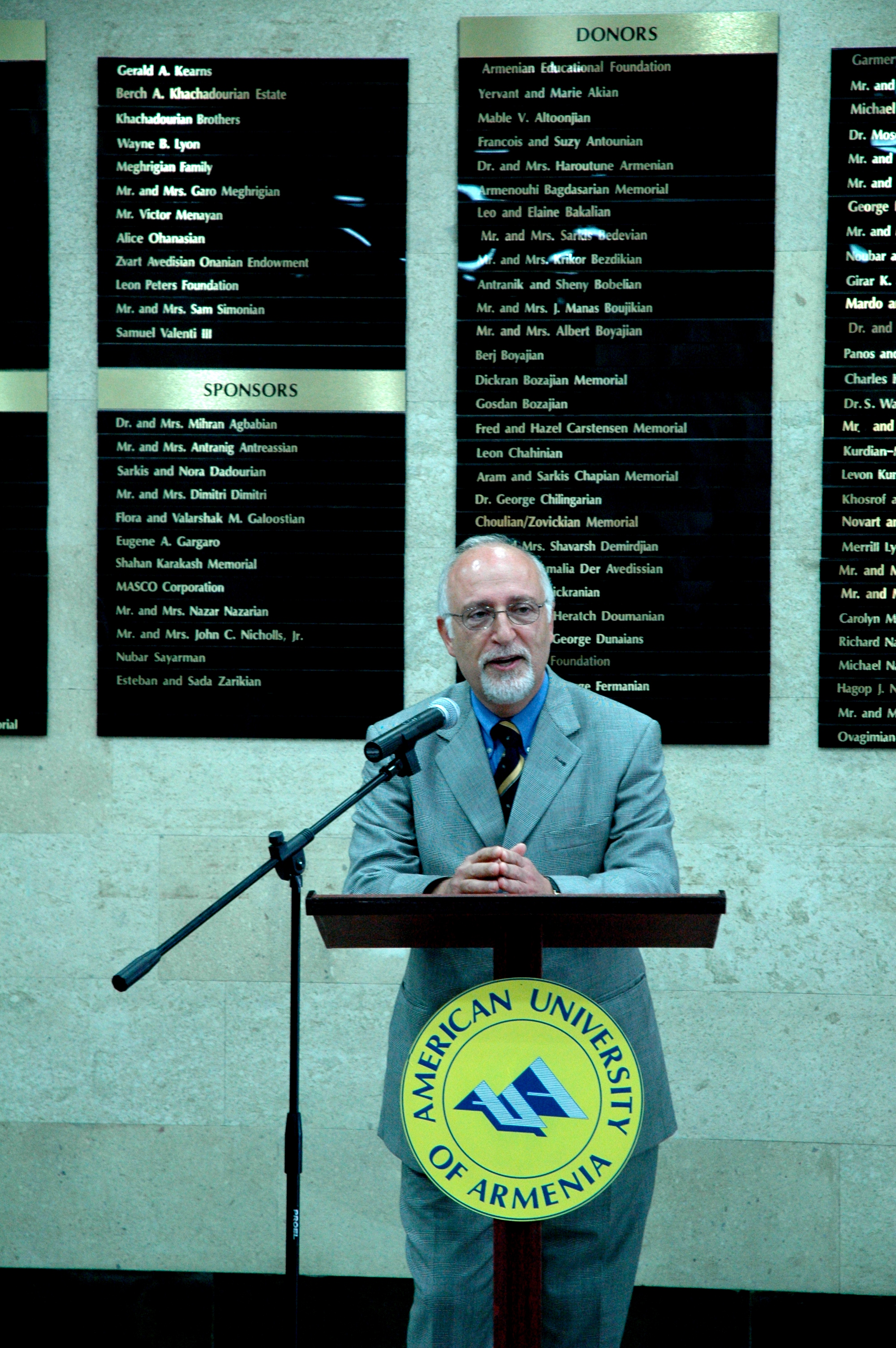
Der Kiureghian at AUA

Armen Der Kiureghian is a member of several societies and associations, including:

- Elected Member of the US National Academy of Engineering
- Elected Foreign Member of the National Academy of Engineering of Armenia, 1994
- Elected Foreign Member of the National Academy of Sciences of Armenia, 1998
- Alfred M. Freudenthal Medal from the Engineering Mechanics Division of ASCE
- George Winter Medal from the Structural Engineering Institute of ASCE
- Distinguished Alumnus of the Department of Civil and Environmental Engineering at University of Illinois at Urbana-Champaign, 2006
- Distinguished Alumnus, Faculty of Engineering, Tehran University, Iran, 2004
- Fulbright Distinguished Professor, University of Ljubljana, Slovenia, 1989
- Mitsubishi Chair Visiting Professor, Tokyo University, Japan, 1989

== Awards ==
- Walter L. Huber Civil Engineering Research Prize, ASCE, 1989
- CERRA Award, Civil Engineering Risk and Reliability Association, 1999
- Movses Khorenatsi Medal, Government of Armenia, 2001
- Alfred M. Freudenthal Medal, Engineering Mechanics Division, ASCE, 2006
- Thomas A. Middlebrooks Award, Goe-Institute, ASCE, 2006
- 2007 Best Paper Award, Journal of Computing in Civil Engineering, ASCE, 2008
- Distinguished Research Award, International Association for Structural Safety and Reliability, 2013
- George Winter Medal, Structural Engineering Institute, ASCE, 2014

== Personal life ==
Der Kiureghian has two children, Naira and Sebouh. He has been married to Nelly Ouzounian since 1983.

== Painting as a hobby ==
Der Kiureghian's main hobby is painting watercolors which he learned from his father, Sumbat, who was a professional artist and watercolorist. He paints landscapes and still life.

== Books ==
- Der Kiureghian, A. (2009). The life and art of Sumbat. ADK & Associates Publishers, San Francisco, CA. 172 pages.
