= Okinawa Institute of Science and Technology =

Private university in Onna, Japan

Coordinates: 26°27′43.01″N 127°49′51.8″E

- 沖縄科学技術大学院大学
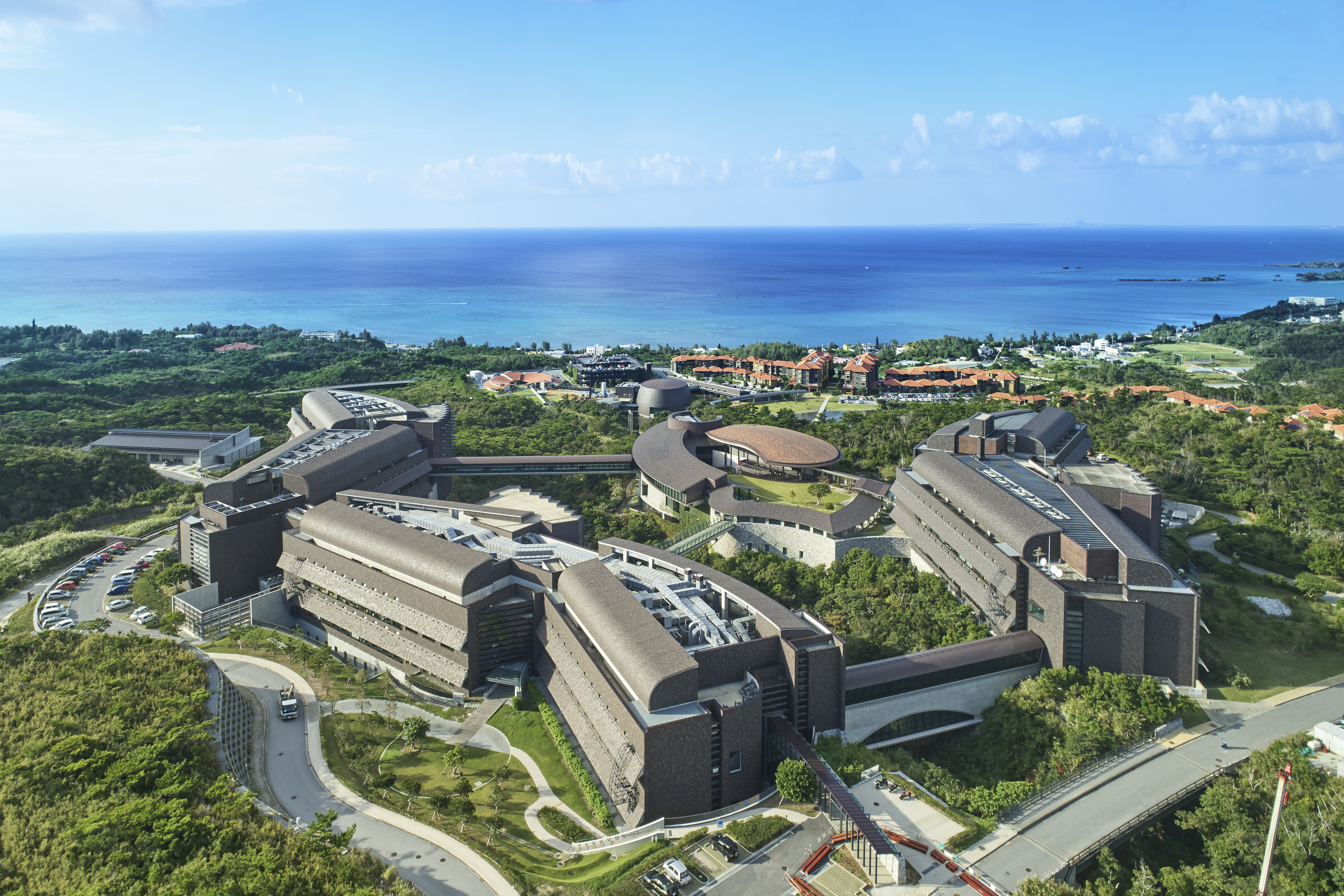
- Aerial view of the main campus
- Type: Private
- Established: 1 November 2011; 14 years ago
- Budget: ¥22 billion
- President: Karin Markides
- Provost: Amy Q. Shen
- Faculty: 98
- Administrative staff: 490
- Total staff: 1,159
- Doctoral students: 303
- Location: Onna, Okinawa, Onna-son, Okinawa, Japan
- Campus: 500 acres; Suburban
- Website: oist.jp

Okinawa Institute of Science and Technology (Japanese: 沖縄科学技術大学院大学, Hepburn: Okinawa Kagaku Gijutsu Daigakuin Daigaku; OIST) is a private, interdisciplinary graduate school located in Onna, Okinawa Prefecture, Japan.

== Overviews ==
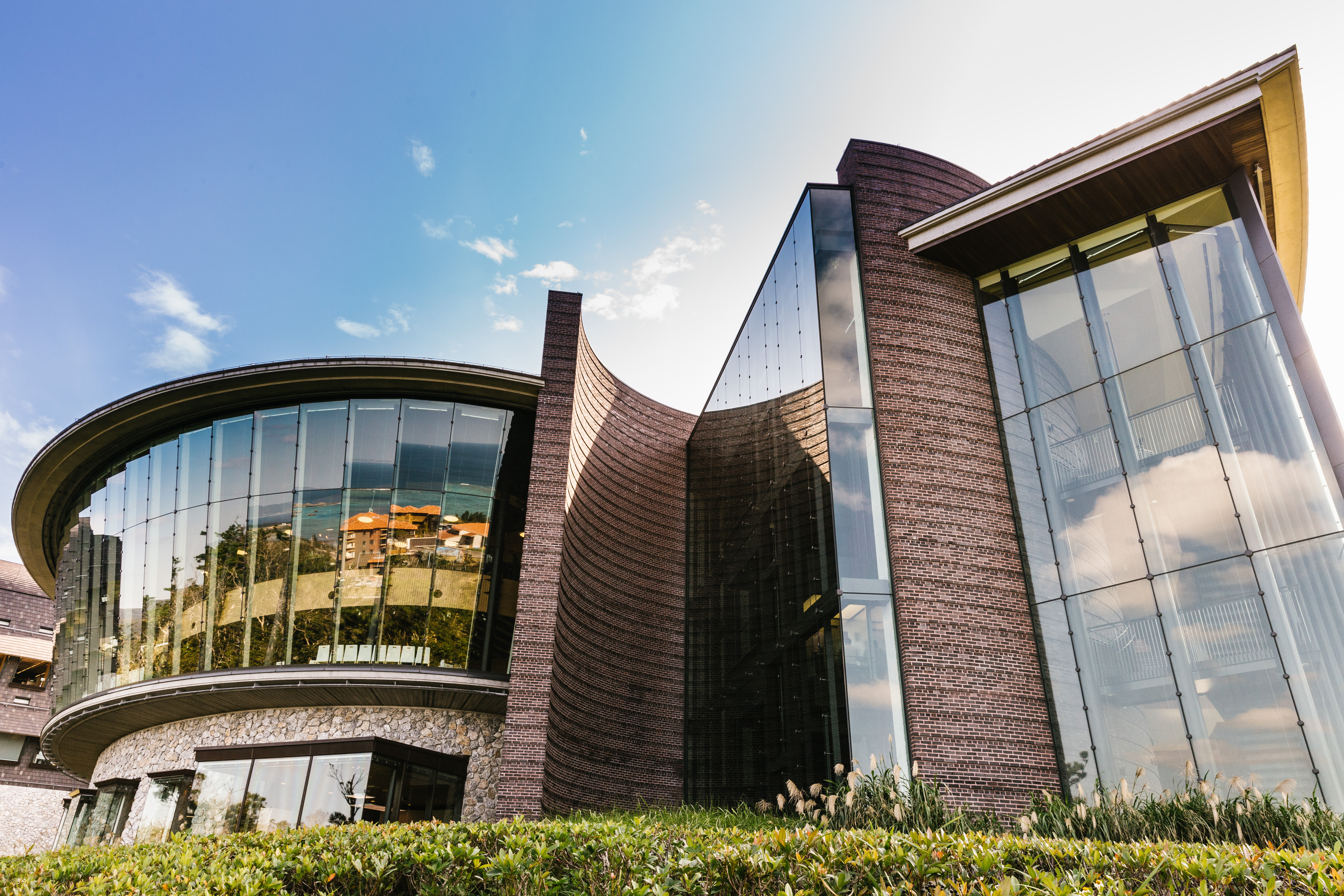
Center building

The school offers a 5-year PhD program in science. Over half of the faculty and students are recruited from outside Japan, and all education and research are conducted in English.

OIST relies on public subsidies paid by the Japanese government. The government subsidy for OIST comes in two areas: a subsidy for operations and a subsidy for facilities.

== History ==
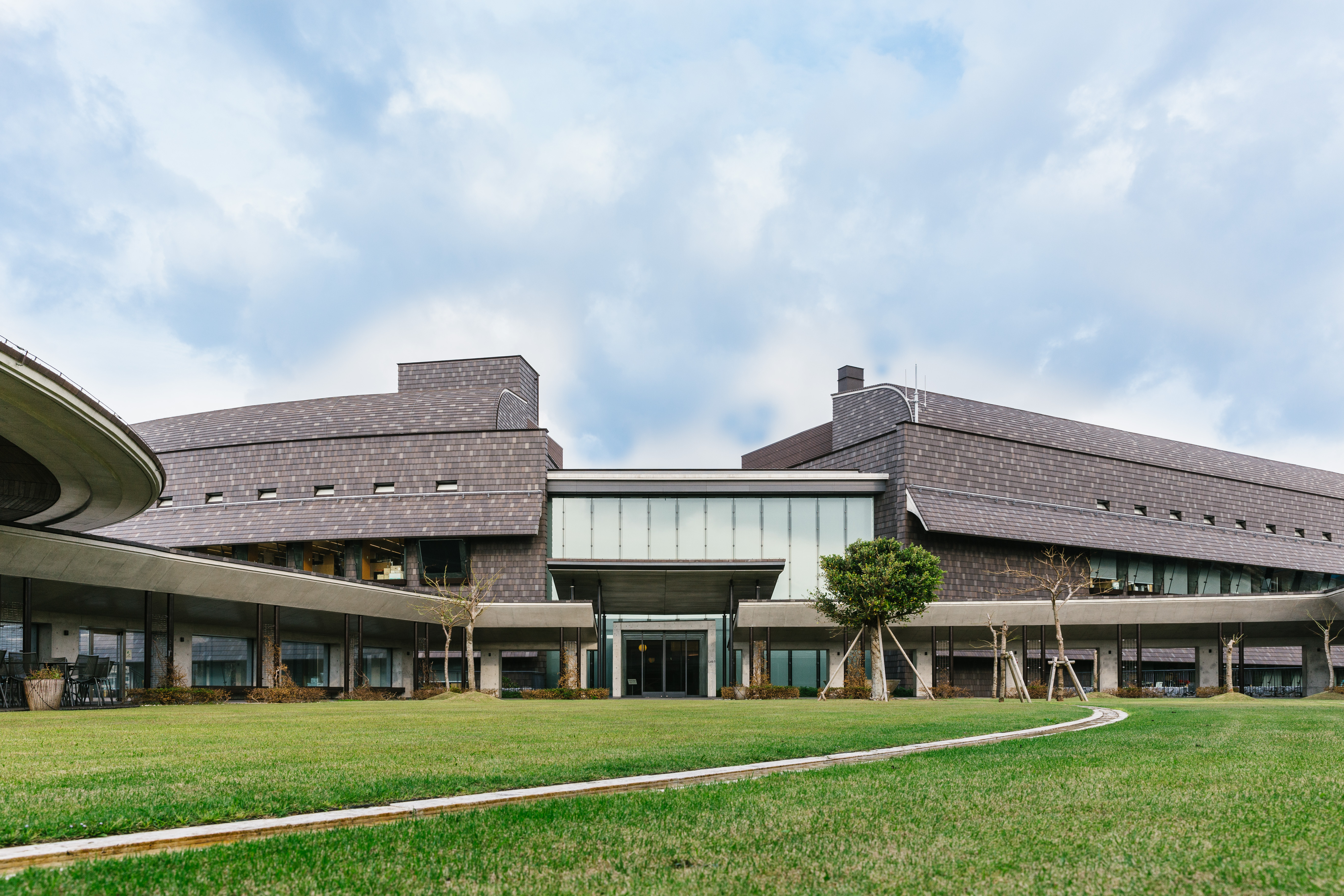
Center court

In June 2001, Kōji Omi, former Minister of State for Okinawa and Northern Territories Affairs and former Minister of State for Science and Technology Policy, announced plans to establish a new graduate university in Okinawa. A Board of Governors was appointed in 2004 and the following year, the Diet recognized OIST as an "Independent Administrative Institution." The first class of students were welcomed in September 2012 after receiving approval.

== Campus ==
OIST has four campus: Main Campus, Seaside Campus, Seragaki Campus, and a Tokyo Office.

OIST's main campus is located in Tancha, Onna-son in Okinawa. As of 2025, this campus has 5 labs, and embodies the majority of the research body.

== Architecture & Design ==
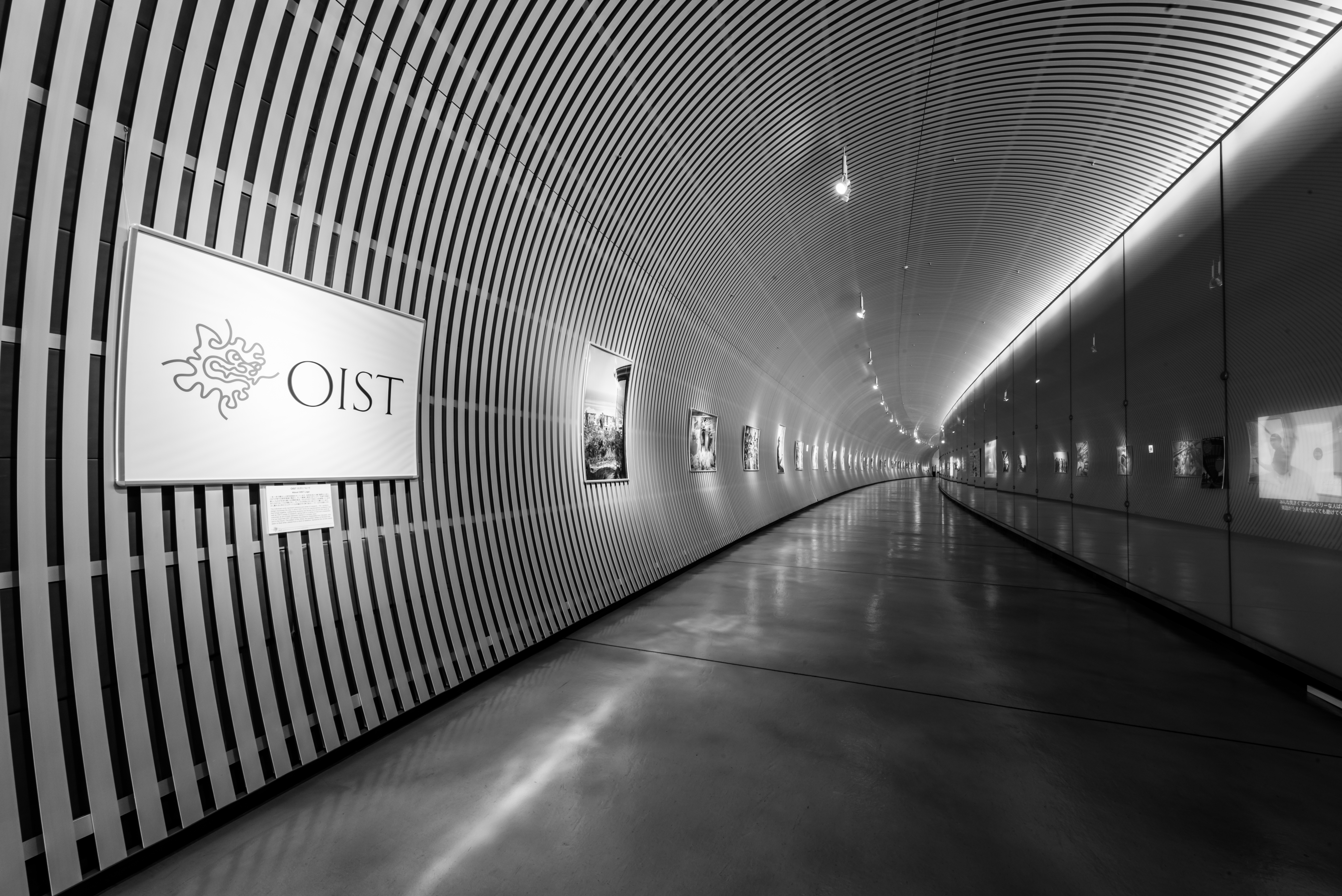
Tunnel gallery

The campus architecture is intentionally designed to foster interdisciplinary interaction, with shared research spaces, open corridors, skywalks, and interstitial common areas.

There is a notable “Tunnel Gallery”: the main entrance gallery, which connects to a glass elevator and then spreads into different parts of the campus.

The Tunnel Gallery is also used for science/art exhibitions and events.

=== Research Buildings ===
- Lab 1: The first lab building. Contains both wet and dry labs, faculty offices, major shared resources: Electron Microscope Suite, DNA Sequencing Center, and a Supercomputing Center.
- Lab 2: Connected to the Center Building via a suspended “Skywalk” bridge over a valley. Houses dry and wet labs (~20 research units), laser labs, clean rooms. Lab 2 earned LEED Silver certification.
- Lab 3: Attached to Lab 2, connected to Lab 1 and Center Court via skywalks or corridors. Houses ~20 labs/offices, the Graduate School, and the Technology Development and Innovation Center (TDIC) for industrial and IP partnerships.
- Lab 4: The largest lab building, on higher ground. Contains administrative offices (President, Provost, etc.), ~20 wet/dry labs, and a Children’s Research Center dedicated to research on ADHD in children.
- Lab 5: (In development / recently completed) — planned to include 7 dry labs, 13 wet labs, and an animal vivarium.
- Marine Science Station (MSS): Located in Seragaki, ~8 km from the main campus. Built for marine science research: has indoor/outdoor seawater tanks, wet labs, offices, with seawater directly pumped from the sea.
- Innovation Square / Incubator: A 500 m^{2} mixed-use facility (wet labs, dry labs, computational R&D) used by startup companies and for collaborative research.

== Academics ==
=== Graduate school ===
The PhD program is taught entirely in English and is individually tailored to each student. Students are encouraged to focus their research on cross-disciplinary areas of studies. Students are recruited through much higher levels of competition than that of the entrance examination for graduate schools of top national universities in Japan. As of May 2022, there were 242 enrolled PhD students from 50 countries. Of these students, 81% were international and 40% identified as women.

=== Faculty ===
As of Nov 2025, the 98 faculty at OIST—consisting of assistant, associate, and tenured professors—have been recruited globally.

=== Research ===
The research community consists of faculty and researchers divided into units based on area of study. The university has no departments—OIST researchers conduct multi-disciplinary research in neuroscience, physics, chemistry, mathematical and computational sciences, molecular, cellular, and developmental biology, environmental and ecological sciences and marine science.

=== Ranking and Reputation ===
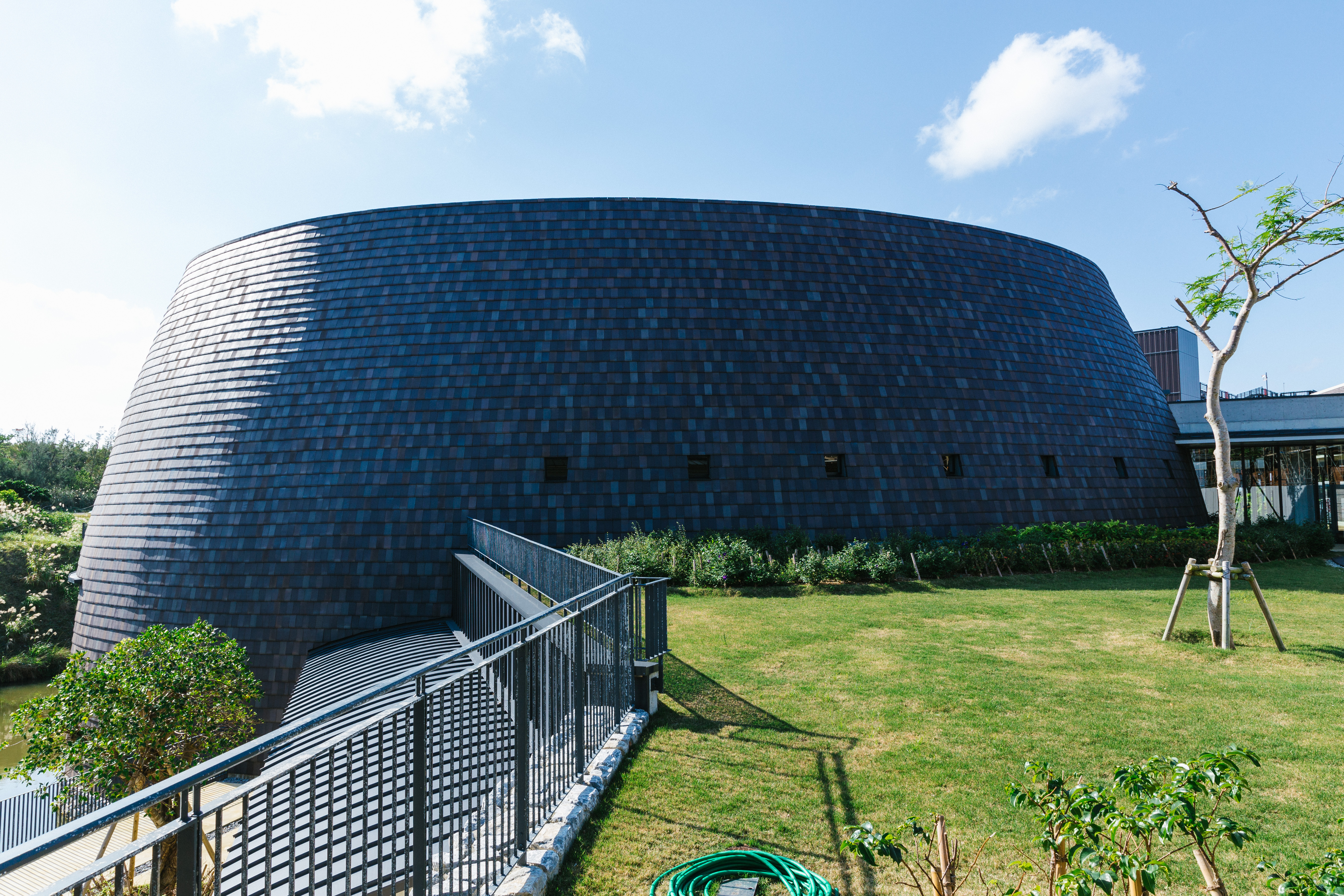
Auditorium

According to a 2015 report, completed by an external peer review panel, OIST is on a par with the 25 universities ranked highest by Times Higher Education, QS or Jiaotong World University Rankings in terms of physical campus infrastructure, management structure and management processes, academic program and recruitment of faculty, graduate program, instrumentation, course to research outcome, technology transfer and welfare, social, and cultural support programs.

In 2019 OIST was ranked 1st in Japan and 9th in the world by the Nature Index for the proportion of its research that is published in high-quality science journals when normalised by size (360 unnormalised ranked). In the 2022 Nature Index, without normalisation for size, OIST ranked 14th in Japan and 372nd in the world.

== Campus Life and Community Facilities ==
The campus entrance is marked by the Tunnel Gallery, an architectural feature that also serves as an exhibition space for art and science displays. A glass elevator connects the gallery to the Center Building, which contains administrative and academic spaces. OIST maintains a university library, a large auditorium that seats approximately five hundred people, and numerous seminar rooms and meeting facilities. Dining options include a campus café and a full-service restaurant.

=== Wellbeing, Healthcare and amenities ===
The university provides extensive support services to its community. The Ganjuu Wellbeing Service offers psychological counseling for students, staff, and their families, while the Health Center in Lab 4 provides routine medical care, vaccinations, and emergency assistance. Other daily-life services include a community gym, laundry facilities, dry-cleaning services, a shuttle bus, and several shared vehicles for campus members.

=== Childcare / Education ===
The children's center provides bilingual (English/Japanese) early education, art, and sports.

==== Child Development Center (CDC) ====
A childcare facility for children aged from ~2 months to preschool (up to 6 years).

==== School-Aged Program (SAP) ====
For children in grades K–6 (ages ~5–14), with after-school and holiday programs. SAP is located at Seaside House.

== Housing ==
OIST offers a wide range of housing options for students, staff, visiting researchers, and faculty. The Village Center combines residential apartments with shared community facilities on the ground floor. West Court provides apartments with landscaped communal areas and private outdoor spaces, while East Court contains one-, two-, and three-bedroom units for families and individuals. South Hill offers smaller one-bedroom apartments intended primarily for students and researchers, and the Gardens complex provides shared housing options for members of the community.

Short-term furnished apartments are available for visiting scientists and participants in conferences and workshops. Faculty members may reside in the Hillside Faculty Houses located near the main campus or in the Seaside Faculty Houses, which overlook the ocean and are designed for larger families.

== Community and Services ==
The OIST Resource Center supports residents by offering assistance with daily life in Okinawa, including navigating local schools, hospitals, and government services. The campus provides a gym, laundry facilities, and transportation options, including shuttle buses and shared cars. As an international community, OIST offers most services in both English and Japanese, supporting a diverse population of researchers, students, and families.

== Sustainability and Design ==
Sustainability is incorporated throughout the campus design. Lab 2's LEED Silver certification reflects the university's emphasis on environmentally conscious construction. Energy-efficient lighting and mechanical systems are used extensively, including LED lighting in nearly all laboratory spaces. The overall campus architecture also takes into account Okinawa's climate, with attention to typhoon resilience, natural ventilation, and ecological preservation around the site.

== See also ==
- King Abdullah University of Science and Technology
