= Haroutune Armenian =

Armenian-American academic (1942–2025)

- Հարություն Արմենյան هاروتیون آرمنیان
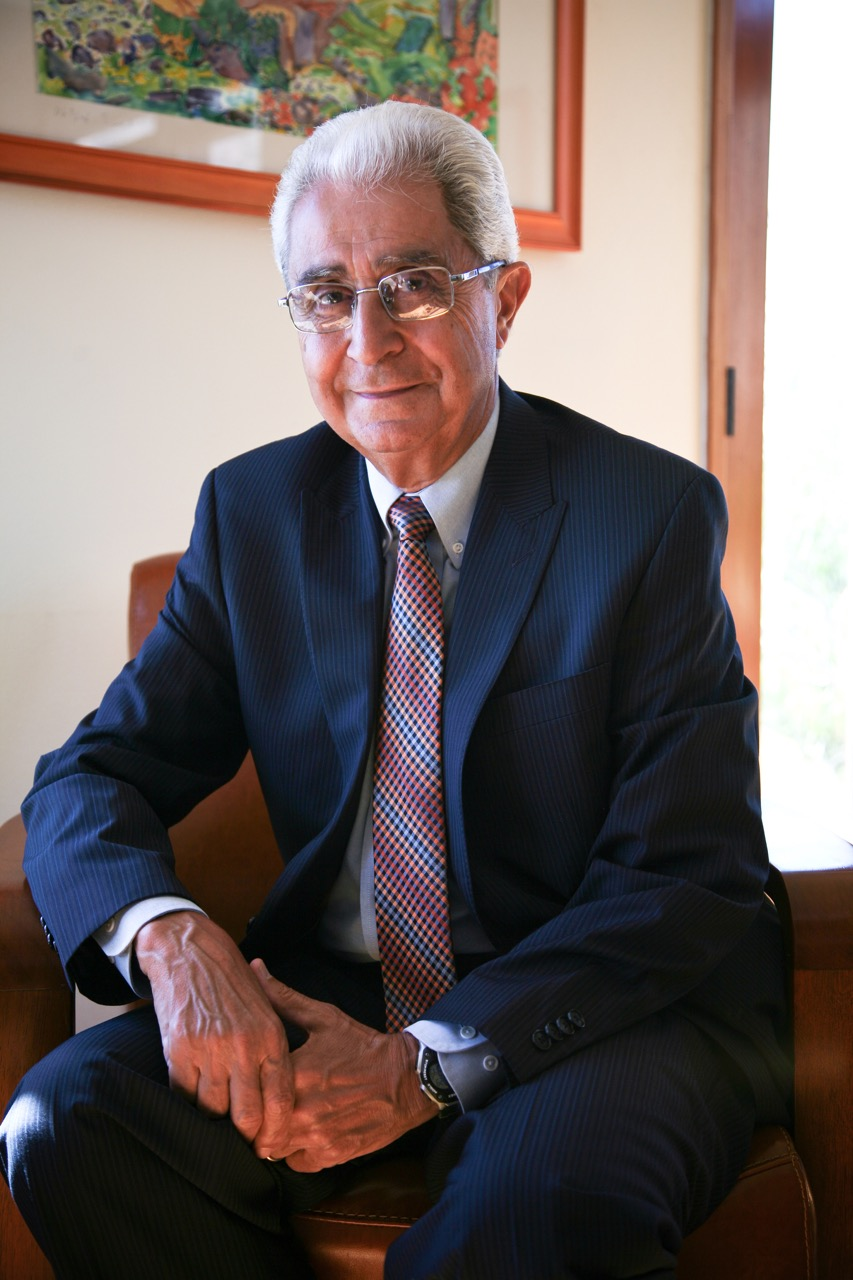
- Born: 18 June 1942; Beirut, Lebanon
- Died: 15 July 2025 (aged 83); Los Angeles, California, U.S.
- Education: American University of Beirut
- Known for: Epidemiology of Disasters and Wars, Familial Mediterranean Fever, International Health

Haroutune Armenian (Armenian: Հարություն Արմենյան, 18 June 1942 – 15 July 2025), was a Lebanese-born Armenian-American academic and physician who was President of the American University of Armenia (1997–2009), President Emeritus, American University of Armenia, and also Professor in Residence, UCLA, Fielding School of Public Health.

== Biography ==
Doctor Armenian was a professor in Residence at the University of California in Los Angeles, President Emeritus of the American University of Armenia, and Professor Emeritus at Johns Hopkins University.

=== Education ===
- American University of Beirut, 1961–1964, B.S. School of Arts and Sciences
- American University of Beirut, 1964–1968, M.D. School of Medicine
- Johns Hopkins University, 1971–1974, M.P.H. (1972)
- Johns Hopkins School Hygiene & Public Health, Dr.P.H. (1974)

=== Post-graduate training ===
- American University Medical Center, 1967–1968, Rotating Intern
- Beirut, Lebanon, 1968–1971, Resident in Internal Medicine
- Johns Hopkins University, 1971–1974, Commonwealth School of Hygiene & Public Health Fund Exchange, Department of Epidemiology Program

=== Certification ===
- E.C.F.M.G. Certificate 1967
- Republic of Lebanon 1968 License to Practice Medicine
- American University of Beirut 1971 Certificate of Specialty Training:Department of Internal Medicine
- Ministry of Health, Lebanon 1984 Internal Medicine
- Registered Medical Specialties and Public Health

=== Professional experience ===
- Advisory Committee for Research, WHO/EMR0 2015 -Associate Dean Academic Programs Fielding School of Public Health, University of California Los Angeles 2011-2014
- Visiting professor, Supervisor Research Chair Epidemiology, Public Health and Environment 2009 - 2013, King Saud University, Riyadh
- Professor in Residence, Department of Epidemiology 2008 – 20??, University of California, Los Angeles
- President, American University of Armenia 1997-2010
- Director of the Master of Public Health Program 1989 – 1996, Johns Hopkins University, School of Hygiene and Public Health, Department of Epidemiology
  - Professor Emeritus 2008 – Present
  - Professor of Epidemiology 1988 – 2007
- Acting Chairman Jan-June 1991 Nov 1993-July 1994
- Deputy Chairman 1988 – 1993
- Visiting professor of Epidemiology 1986 – 1987
- Professor of Epidemiology 1984 – 1988
- American University of Beirut Coordinator, Interfaculty Research Project for the Study 1984-1986 of the Status of Children in Lebanon
- Dean, Faculty of Health Sciences, 1983 – 1988 American University of Beirut
- Coordinator, A Health Surveillance and Monitoring 1983 – 1984
- Program. Ministry of Health, Lebanon
- Acting Dean, Faculty of Health Sciences, A.U.B. 1981 – 1983
- Coordinator, In-Service Program Development, Ministry of Public Health, State of Qatar 1981 – 1983
- Senior Associate, Department of Epidemiology Johns Hopkins University 1980 – 1986
- Associate Professor of Epidemiology Faculty of Health Sciences, A.U.B. 1979 – 1984
- Planning Coordinator, Family Practice Residency Programs; Ministry of Health, State of Bahrain and American University of Beirut 1978 – 1979
- Coordinator, Office of Professional Standards and Systems Analysis; Ministry of Health State of Bahrain 1976 – 1981
- Manager, Health Services Research and Development A.U.B. Services Corporation 1976–1979
- Commissioning Officer, Health Centers, Ministry of Health, State of Bahrain 1976–1978
- Assistant Professor of Epidemiology, School of Public Health, American University of Beirut 1974 – 1979

=== Societies and honors ===
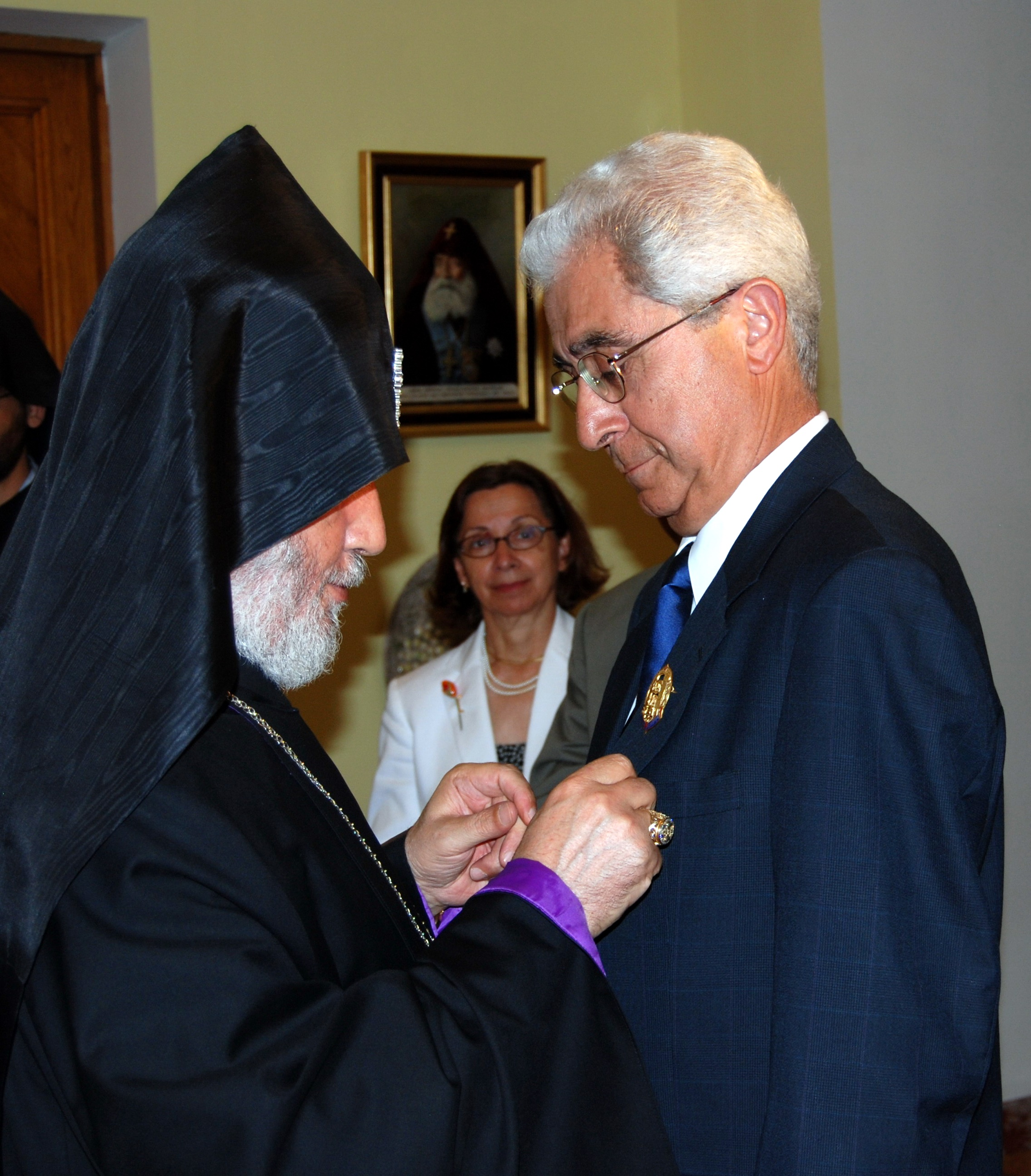
Haroutune Armenian receiving St Sahak St Mashtots Medal

- Order of St. Sahak – St. Mesrop Catholicos of All Armenians, Armenia, 2007
- Advising, Teaching and Mentoring Award Johns Hopkins Bloomberg School Student Assembly 2005 & 1999
- Presidential Medal of the Order of Cedars, Lebanon 2004
- Golden Apple Award for Excellence in Teaching Johns Hopkins Bloomberg School of Public Health 2002
- Movses Khorenatsi Presidential Medal of Service and Accomplishment, Armenia, 2001
- Fellow, Royal College of Physicians, London, 2001
- Honorary Diploma of Appreciation, Ministry of Health, Lebanon 1997
- Secretary, International Epidemiological Association Executive Council 1996–2002
- Ernest Lyman Stebbins Medal, Excellence in Education School of Hygiene and Public Health, Johns Hopkins University 1995
- Honorary President, Armenian Public Health Association 1995
- Member, Scientific Advisory Board, National Institutes of Health of Armenia 1993
- Search Committee, Director, Centers for Disease Control and Prevention, U.S.A. 1993
- Certificate of Recognition of Excellence 1992

==== Armenian Behavioral Science Association ====
- American Epidemiological Society 1989
- Society for Epidemiologic Research 1989
- Secretary, International Board of Advisors 1988

==== Armenian Genealogical Society ====
- Society of Scholars, Johns Hopkins University 1986
- Who's Who in Science 1985
- Who's Who in Lebanon 1985
- Delta Omega, National Honorary Public Health Society 1985
- Central Executive Committee, Hamazkaine 1981

==== Cultural associations ====
- Member, International Epidemiological Association 1981-
- Member, American College of Preventive Medicine 1981
- Executive Board Member, Association of Lebanese 1980 -1982

==== Armenian Physicians ====
- Fellow, American College of Epidemiology 1980
- Member, American Public Health Association 1980 -
- Alpha Omega Alpha honor society 1979
- Board Member, Karageuzian Foundation, Beirut 1978 -1987
- Lebanese Public Health Association 1975
- Lebanese Order of Physicians 1968

=== Painting ===
Armenian started painting in Beirut in 1976 during the civil war in Lebanon. His works have been exhibited in Beirut, Los Angeles and Yerevan.

=== Death ===
Armenian died on 15 July 2025, at the age of 83.

== Publications ==
=== Books ===
- Editor with H. Zurayk and Author of a Chapter: Beirut 1984. A Population & Health Profile. American University Press, 1985.
- Editor with J. Bryce and author of three chapters; In Wartime: The State of Children in Lebanon. American University of Beirut, 1986.
- Armenian HK, Gordis L, Gregg MB and Levine MM (eds): Epidemiologic Reviews, Volume 11, Johns Hopkins University, 1989.
- Armenian HK, Gordis L, Levine MM, Thacker SB (eds): Epidemiologic Reviews, Volume 12, Johns Hopkins University, Baltimore, 1990.
- Armenian HK, Gordis L, Levine MM, Thacker SB (eds): Epidemiologic Reviews, Volume 13, Johns Hopkins University, Baltimore, 1991.
- Armenian HK, Gordis L, Levine MM, Thacker SB (eds): Epidemiologic Reviews, Volume 14, Johns Hopkins University, Baltimore, 1992.
- Armenian HK, Gordis L, Levine MM, Thacker SB (eds): Epidemiologic Reviews, Volume 15, Johns Hopkins University, Baltimore, 1993.
- Armenian HK, (ed). Epidemiologic Reviews, Applications of the Case-Control Method, Volume 16(1), Johns Hopkins University, Baltimore, 1994.
- Armenian HK, Gordis L, Kelsey J, Levine MM, Thacker SB (eds): Epidemiologic Reviews, Volume 16(2), Johns Hopkins University. Baltimore, 1994.
- Armenian HK, Kelsey J, Levine MM, Samet J, Thacker SB (eds): Epidemiologic Reviews, Volume 17(2). Johns Hopkins University, Baltimore, 1995.
- Armenian HK, Kelsey J, Levine MM, Samet J, Thacker SB (eds): Epidemiologic Reviews, Volume 18(2), Johns Hopkins University, Baltimore, 1996.
- Armenian HK, Kelsey J, Levine MM, Samet J. Thacker SB (eds). Epidemiologic Reviews, Volume 19(2), Johns Hopkins University, Baltimore 1997.
- Armenian HK, Shapiro S (eds). Epidemiology and Health Services. Oxford University Press, New York, 1998.
- Armenian HK, Kelsey J, Monto AS, Samet J, Thacker SB (eds). Epidemiologic Reviews, Volume 20 (2), Johns Hopkins University, Baltimore, 1998.
- Armenian HK, Kelsey J, Monto AS, Samet J, Thacker SB (eds). Epidemiologic Reviews, Volume 21(2), Johns Hopkins University, Baltimore, 1999.
- Armenian HK, Samet JM (eds). Epidemiologic Reviews, Volume 22(1), Epidemiology in the Year 2000 and Beyond, Johns Hopkins University. Baltimore, 2000.
- Armenian HK, Kelsey J, Monto AS, Samet J, Thacker SB (eds). Epidemiologic Reviews, Volume 22(2), Oxford University Press for the Johns Hopkins University School of Hygiene and Public Health, Baltimore, 2000.
- Hsing AW, Nomura AM, Isaacs WB, Armenian HK (eds). Epidemiologic Reviews, Volume 23(1), Prostate Cancer, Oxford University Press for the Johns Hopkins University School of Hygiene and Public Health, Baltimore, 2001.
- Armenian HK, Kelsey J, Monto AS, Samet J, Thacker SB (eds). Epidemiologic Reviews, Volume 23(2), Oxford University Press for the Johns Hopkins University School of Hygiene and Public Health, Baltimore, 2002.
- Armenian, HK. Colors and Words from Armenia and Beyond (watercolors and prose-poetry) 2002 in Armenian and 2004 in English, Print info, Yerevan.
- Armenian, HK. Past Does not Melt Here (watercolors & prose poetry) 2007 in Armenian.
- Armenian, HK. Case Control Studies: Design and Applications, Oxford University Press, New York, 2009.
- Armenian, HK. Life With Watercolors. Noah's Ark, Beirut, 2014.

=== Publications-Journals ===
- Armenian HK: Bone and Marrow Needle Biopsy. Leb Med J. 24:245 51;1971.
- Baghdassarian SA, Armenian HK, Khachadurian AK: Absence of Ophthalmoscopic Changes in Familial Paroxysmal Polyserositis. Archives Ophthalmology, 88:607 08;1972.
- Khachadurian AK, Armenian HK: Familial Paroxysmal Polyserositis (FPP): A Report of 120 Cases from Lebanon. Pediatric Research, 6:362-702;1972.
- Khachadurian AK, Armenian HK: The Management of Familial Paroxysmal Polyserositis (Familial Mediterranean Fever). Experience with Low Fat Diets and Clofibrate. Lebanese Medical Journal, 25:495 502;1972.
- Armenian HK, Khachadurian AK: Familial Paroxysmal Polyserositis, Clinical and Laboratory Findings in 120 Cases. Lebanese Medical Journal, 26:605 14; 1973.
- Armenian HK, Lilienfeld AM: The Distribution of Incubation Periods of Neoplastic Diseases. American Journal of Epidemiology, 99:92 100;1974.
- Khachadurian AK, Armenian HK: Familial Paroxysmal Polyserositis. Mode of Inheritance and Incidence of Amyloidosis. Proceedings of the Fifth Conference on the Clinical Delineation of Birth Defects, Baltimore, Maryland. Birth Defects: Original Article Series, 10:62 6;1974.
- Armenian HK, Lilienfeld AM, Diamond EL, Bross IDJ: Relation Between Benign Prostatic Hyperplasia to Cancer of the Prostate. A Prospective and Retrospective Study. Lancet, 2:115 17;1974.
- Armenian HK, Lilienfeld AM, Diamond EL, Bross IDJ: Epidemiologic Characteristics of Patients with Prostatic Neoplasms, American Journal of Epidemiology, 102:47 54;1975.
- Armenian HK, Uthman SM: Familial Paroxysmal Polyserositis. Lebanese Medical Journal. 28:439 42;1975.
- Armenian H K: Medicine and the Nomads. Modern Medicine Middle East, 1:8 11;1975.
- Kabakian HA, Armenian HK, Deeb ZL, Rizk GK: Asymmetry of the Pelvic Ureters in Normal Females. American Journal of Roentgenology, 127(5):723 7;1976.
- Armenian HK: Developing A Quality Assurance Program in the State of Bahrain. Quality Review Bulletin, J.C.A.H. 4:9 11;1978.
- Sawaya J, Atweh G, Armenian HK: Coronary Care Experience in a University Hospital. Middle East Journal of Anesthesiology 5:249 67;1979.
- Sawaya JI, Mujais SK, Armenian HK: Early Diagnosis of Pericarditis in Acute Myocardial Infarction. American Heart Journal, 100:144 51;1980.
- Armenian HK: Evaluation and Projections for the Primary Health Care System in Bahrain. Bahrain Medical Bulletin, 2:71 5;1980.
- Hamadeh RR, Armenian HK, Zurayk HC: Clustering of Cases of Leukemia, Hodgkin's Disease and Other Lymphomas in Bahrain. Tropical and Geographical Medicine, 33:42 9;1981.
- Armenian HK, Dajani AW, Fakhro AM: Impact of Peer Review and Itemized Medical Record Forms on Medical Care in a Health Center in Bahrain. Quality Review Bulletin, 7:6 11;1981.
- Armenian HK, Khuri M: Age at Onset of Genetic Diseases. An Application for Sartwell's Model of the Distribution of Incubation Periods. M.E.J. Anesthesiologyl, 113:596 605;1981.
- Armenian HK, Chamieh MA, Baraka A: Influence of Wartime Stress and Psychosocial Factors in Lebanon on Analgesic Requirements for Post Operative Pain. Social Science and Medicine, 15E:63 6;1981.
- Kimball A, Hamadeh RR, Mahmood RAH, Khalfan S, Muhsin A, Ghabrial F, Armenian HK: Gynecomastia Among Children in Bahrain. Lancet, February 28, 1981.
- Armenian HK: Genetic and Environmental Factors in the Etiology of Familial Paroxysmal Polyserositis. Tropical and Geographical Medicine. 34:183 87;1982.
- Khachadurian AK, Uthman S, Armenian HK: Association of Tendon Xanthomas and Corneal Arcus with Coronary Heart Disease in Heterozygous Familial Hypercholesterolemia. World Congress of Cardiology, June, 1982.
- Armenian HK: Enrollment Bias and Variation in Clinical Manifestations: A Review of Consecutive Cases of Familial Paroxysmal Polyserositis. Journal of Chronic Disease, 36:209 12;1983.
- Armenian HK, Lilienfeld AM: Incubation Period of Disease, Epidemiology Reviews, 5:1 15;1983.
- Yazigi A, Zahr L, Armenian HK: Patient Compliance in a Well Baby Clinic. Effect of Two Modes of Intervention. Tropical and Geographical Medicine, 38(2):104 09;1986
- Armenian HK: In Wartime: Options for Epidemiology. American Journal of Epidemiology, 124:28 32;1986.
- Armenian HK, Sha'ar KH: Epidemiologic Observations in Familial Paroxysmal Polyserositis. Epidemiology Reviews, 8:106 16;1986.
- Armenian HK, Zurayk HC, Kazandjian VA: The Epidemiology of Infant Deaths in the Armenian Parish Records of Lebanon. International Journal of Epidemiology, 15:372 77;1986.
- Lockwood Hourani L, Armenian H, Zurayk H, Afifi L: A Population Based Survey of Loss and Psychological Distress During War. Social Science and Medicine. 23:269 75;1986.
- Armenian HK, Issa JP, Sahakian V, Tawa C, Ariss L, Dona F, Saliba K: Snoring and hypertension in a study sample from Lebanon. Lebanese Medical Journal, 36:25 7;1986.
- Obermeyer CM, Armenian HK, Azoury R: Endometriosis in Lebanon. A Case Control Study. American Journal of Epidemiology, 124:762 7;1986.
- Armenian HK, Saadeh FM, Armenian SL: Widowhood and Mortality in an Armenian Church Parish in Lebanon. American Journal of Epidemiology, 125:127 32;1987.
- Darwish MJ, Armenian HK: A Case Control Study of Rheumatoid Arthritis in Lebanon. International Journal of Epidemiology, 16:420 24;1987.
- Armenian HK: Incubation Periods of Cancer: Old and New. Journal of Chronic Diseases, 40:95 155;1987.
- Armenian HK, Lakkis NG, Sibai AM, Halabi SS: Hospital Visitors as Controls. American Journal of Epidemiology, 127:404 06;1988.
- Armenian HK, Acra A. From the missionaries to the endemic war: Public health action and research at the American University of Beirut. Journal of Public Health Policy, 9:261 72;1988.
- Armenian HK, Chamieh MA, Darwish MJ: The use of the lognormal distribution to study the time of occurrence of drug induced diseases. Journal of Clinical Research & Drug Development, 2:101 13;1988.
- Armenian HK, Hamadeh RR, Chamieh MA, Rumaihi N: Seasonal variation of hospital deaths in some Middle Eastern countries. Lebanese Science Bulletin, 4(2):55 64;1988.
- Armenian HK. Perceptions from epidemiologic research in an endemic war. Social Science and Medicine, 28:643 47;1989.
- Armenian HK, Halabi SS, Khlat M. Epidemiology of primary health problems in Beirut. Journal of Epidemiology and Community Health, 43:315-318;1989.
- Armenian HK, McCarthy JF, Balabanian SG. Patterns of mortality in Armenian parish records from eleven countries. American Journal of Epidemiology, 130(6):1227-1235;1989.
- Noji EK, Kelen GD, Armenian HK et al. The 1988 earthquake in Soviet Armenia: A case study. Annals of Emergency Medicine 19:891-97;1990.
- Sibai AM, Armenian HK, Alam S. Wartime determinants of arteriographically confirmed coronary artery disease in Beirut. Middle East Journal of Anesthesiology. 1991 Feb; 11(1): 25–38.
- Pereira Fonseca MG, Armenian HK. Use of the Case-Control Method in Outbreak Investigations. American Journal of Epidemiology, 133(7):748-752;April 1991.
- Armenian HK. Case investigation in epidemiology. American Journal of Epidemiology, 134 (10):1067-1072;1991.
- Armenian HK, Noji EK, Oganesian AP. A case-control study of injuries due to the earthquake in Armenia. Bulletin of the World Health Organization, 70(2):251-257;1992.
- Palenicek J, Fox R, Margolick J, Farzadegan H, Hoover D, Odaka N, Rubb S, Armenian H, Harris J, Saah A. Longitudinal Study of Homosexual Couples Discordant for HIV-1 Antibodies in the Baltimore MACS. Journal of Acquired Immune Deficiency Syndrome, 5:1204-1211;1992.
- Armenian HK, McCarthy JF, Balbanian SG. Patterns of Infant Mortality from Armenian Parish Records: A Study from Ten Countries of the Diaspora between 1737 and 1982. International Journal of Epidemiology, 22(3):457-462;1993.
- Batieha AM, Armenian HK, Norkus EP, Morris JS, Spate VE, Comstock GW. Serum Micronutrients and the Subsequent Risk of Cervical Cancer in a Population Based Nested Case-Control Study. Cancer Epidemiology Biomarkers and Prevention 2:335-339; July/August 1993.
- Armenian HK, Hoover DR, Rubb S, Metz S, Kaslow R, Visscher B, Chmiel J, Kingsley L, Saah A. A Composite Risk Score for Kaposi's Sarcoma Based on a Case-Control and Longitudinal Study in the MACS Population. American Journal of Epidemiology, 138(4):256-265;1993
- Hoover DR, Black C, Jacobson LP, Martinez-Maza, O, Seminara D, Saah A, Von Roenn J, Anderson R, Armenian HK. An Epidemiological Analysis of Kaposi's Sarcoma as an Early and Late AIDS Outcome in Gay Men. American Journal of Epidemiology, 138(4):266-278;1993.
- Noji EK, Armenian HK, Oganessian A. Issues of rescue and medical care following the 1988 Armenian earthquake. International Journal of Epidemiology. 1993 Dec; 22(6): 1070–6.
- Armenian HK, Lilienfeld DE. Applications of the case-control method. Overview and Historical Perspective. Epidemiology Reviews 16(1):1-5;1994.
- Dwyer DM, Strickler H, Goodman RA, Armenian HK. Use of Case-Control Studies in Outbreak Investigations. Epidemiology Reviews 16(1):109-123;1994.
- Armenian HK, Gordis L. Future Perspectives on the Case-Control Method. Epidemiology Reviews 16(1):163-164;1994.
- Armenian HK, Invited Commentary on The Distribution of Incubation Periods of Infectious Disease, American Journal of Epidemiology 141(5):385; March 1, 1995.
- Jacobson LP and Armenian HK. Epidemiology of Kaposi's Sarcoma: An Integrated Approach. Current Opinion in Oncology,7:450-455;1995.
- Armenian HK, Szklo M. Morton Levin (1904-1995): history in the making. American Journal of Epidemiology. 143(6):648-9.
- Armenian HK, Hoover DR, Rubb S, Metz S, Martinez-Maza O, Chmiel J, Kingsley L, Saah A. Risk Factors for Non-Hodgkin's Lymphomas in Acquired Immunodeficiency Syndrome (AIDS), American Journal of Epidemiology, 143(4):374-9;1996.
- Pratt LA, Ford DE, Crum R, Armenian HK, Gallo JJ, Eaton WW. Depression, Psychotropic Medication and Risk of Myocardial Infarction. Circulation 94(12):3123-3129, December 15, 1996.
- Eaton WW, Armenian HK, Gallo JJ, Pratt L & Ford DE. Depression and Risk for Onset of Type II Diabetes: A prospective population-based study, Diabetes Care, 19(10):1097-1101, 1996.
- Armenian HK, From Disasters to Inner City Environment: Psychological Determinants of Physical Illness, Journal of Epidemiology 6(4 Suppl):S49-S52, 1997.
- Armenian HK, Melkonian A, Noji EK, Hovanesian AP: Deaths and Injuries due to the Earthquake in Armenia: A Cohort Approach, International Journal of Epidemiology, 26(4):806-13, 1997.
- Hisada M, Mueller NE, Welles SL, Okayama A, Armenian HK, Hoover DR, Rubb S, Metza S., Saah A., Chmiel J. Risk factors for non-Hodgkin's lymphomas in acquired immunodeficiency syndrome (AIDS). American Journal of Epidemiology 147(8):681-2.
- Harty L, Caporaso N, Hayes R, Winn D, Terry B, Blot W, Kleinman D, Brown L, Armenian HK, Fraumeni J, Shields P. Alcohol Dehydrogenase 3 Genotype and Risk of Oral Cavity and Pharyngeal Cancer, Journal of the National Cancer Institute 89(22):1698-705, 1997.
- Vlahov D, Junge B, Brookmeyer R, Cohn S, Riley E, Armenian H, Beilenson P. Reductions in High Risk Drug Use Behaviors Among Participants in the Baltimore Needle Exchange Program, Journal of Acquired Immune Deficiency Syndromes and Human Retrovirology, 16(5):400-406, 1997.
- Armenian HK, Pratt, LA, Gallo J, Eaton WW. Psychopathology as a Predictor of Disability: a Population Based Follow-Up Study in Baltimore. American Journal of Epidemiology, 148(3):269-75;1998.
- Armenian HK, Melkonian AK, Hovanesian AP. Long Term Mortality and Morbidity Related to Degree of Damage Following the 1988 Earthquake in Armenia, American Journal of Epidemiology, 148(11):1077-1084;1998.
- Wang SS, O'Neill JP, Qian GS, Zhu YR, Wang JB, Armenian H, Zarba A, Wang JS Kensler TW, Cariello NF, Groopman JD, Swenberg JA. Elevated HPRT mutation frequencies in aflatoxin-exposed residents of Daxin Qidong County, People's Republic of China. Carcinogenesis, 20(11):979-84; 1999.
- Bovasso G, Eaton W, Armenian H. The long-term outcomes of mental health treatment in a population-based study, Journal of Consulting and Clinical Psychology, 67:529-38; 1999.
- Schroeder JR, Saah AJ, Hoover DR, Margolick JB, Ambinder RF, Martinez-Maza O, Crabb Breen E, Jacobson LP, Variakojis D, Rowe DT, Armenian HK. Serum Soluble CD23 Level Correlates with Subsequent Development of AIDS-Related Non-Hodgkin's Lymphoma. Cancer Epidemiology Biomarkers and Prevention. November 1999.
- Blanchard JF, Armenian HK, Paoulter Friesen P. Risk factors for abdominal aortic aneurysms: a case-control study. American Journal of Epidemiology 151(6): 575–83; 2000.
- Blanchard JF, Armenian HK, Peeling R, Poulter Friesen P, Shen C, Burnham RC. The relation between Chlamydia Pneumoniae infection and abdominal aortic aneurysm: A case-control study. Clinical Infectious Disease 2000;30(6):946-47
- Jacobson LP, Jenkins FJ, Springer G, Munoz A, Shah KV, Phair J, Zhang ZF and Armenian H. Interaction of HIV-1 and HHV-8 Infections and the Incidence of Kaposi's Sarcoma. Journal of Infectious Diseases 2000; 181:1940-9.
- Gallo JJ, Armenian HK, Ford DE, Eaton WW, Khachatruian AS. Major Depression and cancer: the 13 year follow-up of the Baltimore Epidemiologic Catchment Area sample (United States). Cancer Causes and Control 11:751-58, 2000.
- Armenian HK, Masahiro M, Melkonian AK, Hovanesian AP, Haroutunian N, Saigh PA, Akiskal K, Akiskal HS. Loss as a determinant of PTSD in a cohort of adult survivors of the 1988 earthquake in Armenia; implications for policy. Acta Psychiatrica Scandinavica 2000:102(1):58-64.
- Swartz KL, Pratt LA, Armenian HK, Lee LC, Eaton WW. Mental Disorders and the Incidence of Migraine Headaches in the Community Sample: Results from the Baltimore ECA Follow-up Study. Archives in General Psychiatry, October 2000.
- Sibai AM, Fletcher A, Armenian HK. Variations in the Impact of Long-term Wartime Stressors on Mortality among Middle-aged and Older Populations in Beirut, 1983–93. American Journal of Epidemiology 154(2):128-137;2001.
- Gregory, PC; Gallo, JJ; Armenian, H. Occupational physical activity and the development of impaired mobility - The 12-year follow-up of the Baltimore epidemiologic catchment area sample. American Journal of Physical Medicine and Rehabilitation, 80(4)270-75 April 2001.
- Hsing AW, Chang L, Nomura AM, Isaacs WB, Armenian HK. A glimpse into the future. Epidemiology Review 2001; 23(1):2.
- Bogner HR, Sammel MD, Ford DE, Armenian HK, Eaton WW. Urinary Incontinence and Psychological Distress Among Community-Dwelling Older Adults. Journal of the American Geriatric Society 50:1-7, 2002.
- Armenian HK, Morikawa M, Melkonian AK, Hovanesian A, Akiskal K, Akiskal HS. Risk Factors for Depression in the Survivors of the 1988 Earthquake in Armenia. Journal of Urban Health: Bull of the New York Academy of Medicine, 79(3): 373–82, September 2002.
- Babayan ZV, McNamara RL, Nagajothi N, Kasper EK, Armenian HK, Powe NR, Baughman, KL. Lima JAC. Predictors of Cause-Specific Hospital Readmissions in Patients with Congestive Heart Failure. Clinical Cardiology, 26, 411–418, 2003.
- Bernstein KT, Jacobson LP, Jenkins FJ, Vlahov D, Armenian HK. Factors associated with human herpesvirus type 8 infection in an injecting drug user cohort. Sexually Transmitted Diseases. 2003 March; 30 (3): 199–204.
- Meyer CM, Armenian HK, Eaton WW, Ford DE. Incident hypertension associated with depression in the Baltimore Epidemiologic Catchment area follow-up study. Journal of Affective Disorders. 2004 December; 83(2-3):127-133.
- Schneider MF, Gange SJ, Margolick JB, Detels R, Chmiel JS, Rinaldo C, Armenian HK. Application of Case-Crossover and Case-time-control study designs in analyses of time-varying predictors of T-cell homeostasis failure. Annals of Epidemiology 15(2):137-144; February 2005.
- Lucas KE, Armenian HK, Debusk K, Calkins HG, Rowe PC. Characterizing Gulf War Illnesses: Neurally mediated hypotension and postural tachycardia syndrome. American Journal of Medicine. 118, 1421-27:2005.
- Mehio-Sibai A, Feinleib M, Sibai TA and Armenian HK. A positive or a negative confounding variable? A simple teaching aid for clinicians and students. Annals of Epidemiology 15 (6):421-3: July 2005.
- Srapyan Z, Armenian HK, Petrosyan V. Health-related quality of life and depression among older people in Yerevan, Armenia: a comparative survey of retirement home and household residents aged 65 years old and over. Age and Ageing, Advance Access, vol 35(2): 190–193, published Oxford University Press on behalf of the British Geriatrics Society: January 2006.
- Lucas KE, Armenian HK, Petersen GM, Rowe PC. Familial aggregation of fainting in a case-control study of neurally mediated hypotension patients who present with unexplained chronic fatigue. Europace 2006 October; 8(10): 846–851. Epub 2006 Aug 18.
- Sahakyan A, Armenian H, Breitscheidel L., Thompson M, Yenokyan G. Feeding practices of babies and the development of atopic dermatitis in children after 12 months of age in Armenia: is there a signal?" European Journal of Epidemiology, 2006; 21(9): 723–725. Epub 2007 April 5.
- Armenian, HA, Armenian Medical Roots, Public Health: An Armenian Perspective. Armenian Medical Review, pp. 22–25. (September, 2006).
- Lucas KE, Rowe PC, Armenian HK. Latency and exposure-health associations in Gulf War veterans with early fatigue onsets: a case-control study. Annals of Epidemiology. 2007 Oct;17(10):799-806. Epub 2007 Jul 26.
- Mussolino ME, Armenian HK. Low bone mineral density, coronary heart disease, and stroke mortality in men and women: the Third National Health and Nutrition Examination Survey. Annals of Epidemiology. 2007 Nov;17(11):841-6. Epub 2007 Aug 28.
- Shiels MS, Cole SR, Wegner S, Armenian H, Chmiel JS, Ganesan A, Marconi VC, Martinez-Maza O, Martinson J, Weintrob A, Jacobson LP, Crum-Cianflone NF. Effect of HAART on incident cancer and noncancer AIDS events among male HIV seroconverters. Journal of Acquire Immune Deficiency Syndrom. 2008 Aug 1;48(4):485-90.
- Armenian, HK. Quality Assurance Parallels in Health Care Evaluation and Educational Assessment: The American University of Armenia Experience. Education for Health Journal, Epub. July 2009.
- Armenian, HK. Epidemiology: a problem-solving journey. American Journal of Epidemiology. 2009 Jan 15; 169 (2): 127–31. Epub 2008 Nov 12.
- Sevoyan MK, Sarkisian TF, Belaryan AA, Shahsuvaryan GR, Armenian HK. Prevention of Amyloidosis in Familial Mediterranean Fever with Colchicine. A Case-Control Study in Armenia. Medical Principles and Practice 115, 2009
- Armenian HK, Khatib R. Developing an Instrument of Measuring Human Dignity and Its Relationship to Health in Palestinian Refugees. World Medical & Health Policy, Vol. 2: Iss. 2, Article 3, 2010.
- Petrosyan D, Armenian HK. Interaction of maternal age and mode of delivery in the development of postpartum depression in Yerevan, Armenia. Journal of Affective Disorders, Vol. 135, Issues 1–3, Pages 77–81, December 2011
- Yenokyan G, Armenian HK. Triggers for Attacks in Familial Mediterranean Fever: application of the Case-Crossover Design. American Journal of Epidemiology. American Journal of Epidemiology, volume 175, issue 10, 2012
- Khachadourian V, Armenian HK, Demirchyan A, Goenjian A. Loss and Psycho-social Factors as Determinants of Quality of Life in a Cohort of Earthquake Survivors. Health and Quality of Life Outcomes. Health and Quality of Life Outcomes. 2015, Feb 13:13.
- Anahit Demirchyan, Vahe Khachadourian, Haroutune K Armenian, Varduhi Petrosyan. Short and Long Term Determinants of Incident Multimorbidity in a Cohort of 1988 Earthquake Survivors in Armenia. International Journal for Equity in Health. August 20, 2013.
- Harutyunyan A, Armenian H and Petrosyan V. Interbirth interval and history of previous preeclampsia: a case–control study among multiparous women. BMC Pregnancy and Childbirth. December 27, 2013
- Demirchyan A, Petrosyan, D, Armenian, HK. Rate and predictors of postpartum depression in a 22-year follow-up of a cohort of earthquake survivors in Armenia. Archives of Women's Mental Health. 2014 Jun 17(3): 229-37
- Demirchyan A, Petrosyan V, Armenian HK, Khachadourian V. Prospective study of predictors of poor self-rated health in a 23-year cohort of earthquake survivors in Armenia. Journal of Epidemiology and Global Health. 2015, Feb. doi:10.1016/j.jegh.2014.12.006
- Khachadourian V, Armenian HK, Demirchyan A, Melkonian A, Hovanesian A. Post Earthquake Psychopathological Investigation in Armenia: research methodology, summary of previous findings and recent follow-up. Disasters. Europe PMC. 16 Nov 2015, 40(3):518-533.DOI: 10.1111/disa.12166 PMID 26578424

=== Book reviews, letters to the editor and other ===
- Sunlight and Breast Cancer Incidence in the USSR. International Journal of Epidemiology 20(4);1145-1146, 1991.
- Lives at Risk: Public Health in the Nineteenth-Century Egypt by LaVerne Kuhnke, University of California Press, Berkeley, 1990,243pp. Egypt's Other Wars: Epidemics and the Politics of Public Health by Nancy Elizabeth Gallagher, Syracuse University Press, Syracuse, New York 1990, 256pp. American Journal of Epidemiology 136(6):761-762, 1992.
- Manual of Epidemiology for District Health Management Edited by J.P. Vaughan and R.H. Morrow, World Health Organization, Geneva, 1989, 198pp. American Journal of Epidemiology 133(9):956-957, 1992.
- History of Epidemiology: Proceedings of the 13th International Symposium on the Comparative History of Medicine—East and West Edited by K. Yosio, S. Shizu
- O. Yasuo, Ishiyaku EuroAmerica, Inc. Tokyo, Japan, 1993, 224pp. American Journal of Epidemiology 139(1), 1994:110-111.
- The Cambridge World History of Human Disease Edited by K.F. Kiple, Cambridge University Press, Cambridge England, 1993, 1176pp.
- The Public Health Consequences of Disasters by Eric Noji(ed), Oxford University Press, American Journal of Epidemiology 146(2):205-206, 1997.
- Risk Factors for Non-Hodgkin's Lymphomas in Acquired Immunodeficiency Syndrome (AIDS), American Journal of Epidemiology 146(8):681-682, 1997.
- Sibai, AM; Armenian, HK. Long-term psychological stress and heart disease. Int J Epidemiol, 29(5):948-948 October 2000.
- Archie Cochrane: Back to the Front by F Xavier Bosch and R Molas (eds), published privately, Barcelona, Spain, 2003, pp. 234. American Journal of Epidemiology 2005;162:917-918.
- Psychological distress among adolescents in Chengdu, Sichuan at one month after the 5.12.2008 earthquake – by professor Joseph TF Lau. Journal of Urban Health.

=== Thesis for the Degree of Doctor of Public Health ===
- Armenian HK: The Relationship of Benign Prostatic Hyperplasia to Cancer of the Prostate. An Epidemiological Study. Johns Hopkins University, School of Hygiene and Public Health, Baltimore, Maryland, 1974.
