= Bruce M. Boghosian =

American mathematician

Prof. Bruce Michael Boghosian is the sixth president of the American University of Armenia (AUA) in Yerevan, Armenia, having assumed that position in September 2023. He also served as that institution’s third president from 2010 to 2014, during which time he oversaw the creation, accreditation and inauguration of AUA’s undergraduate program – the first American-accredited bachelor program in the former Soviet Union.

Prof. Boghosian is an American mathematician of Armenian ancestry. He has been a professor of mathematics at Tufts University since 2000, and was chair of the mathematics department from 2006 to 2010. He also holds adjunct positions in the Tufts University Departments of Physics and Computer Science.

== Biography ==
Boghosian received his bachelor's degree in physics and master's degree in nuclear engineering from the Massachusetts Institute of Technology. He earned his PhD from the Department of Applied Science at the University of California, Davis.

From 1978 to 1986, he was a physicist in the Plasma Theory Group at the Lawrence Livermore National Laboratory in California.

From 1986 through 1994, he was a Senior Scientist in the Mathematical Research Group at Thinking Machines Corporation in Cambridge, Massachusetts.

From 1994 through 2000, prior to coming to Tufts University, Boghosian held the position of Research Associate Professor at the Center for Computational Science and Department of Physics at Boston University.

From 2010 to 2014, while on leave from Tufts University, Boghosian served as the third president of the American University of Armenia in Yerevan, Armenia.

Boghosian has held visiting academic positions at the Département de Mathématiques, Paris-Sud University in Orsay, France; the École normale supérieure in Paris; Peking University in Beijing; University College London; the University of California, Berkeley; the International Centre for Theoretical Physics in Trieste, Italy; the Schlumberger Cambridge Research Centre in Cambridge, United Kingdom; and the Massachusetts Institute of Technology.

== Fellowships and publications ==
Boghosian has been a fellow of the American Physical Society since 2000, and a foreign member of the Armenian National Academy of Sciences since 2008. He is a recipient of Tufts University's Distinguished Scholar Award in 2010, and its Undergraduate Initiative in Teaching (UNITE) award in 2002. In 2014 he received the "Order of the Republic of Armenia" from the Armenian Prime Minister, and the "Gold Medal" from the Armenian Ministry of Education and Science. His 2019 article "The Inescapable Casino" was published in six languages, and included in the volume "The Best Writing on Mathematics 2020".

Boghosian has over 110 publications, has given over 220 invited talks, and has one patent.

He is a member of the editorial boards of the Journal of Computational Science, Physica A, and International Journal of Modern Physics C – Physics and Computers.

== Research interests ==
Boghosian's research interests center on applied dynamical systems and applied probability theory, with an emphasis on kinetic theory, as it applies to fluids, soft condensed matter, and agent-based models in the social sciences. From 2014 to the present, his work has centered on kinetic-theoretical models of wealth distribution.
