= American University of Armenia =

University in Yerevan, Armenia

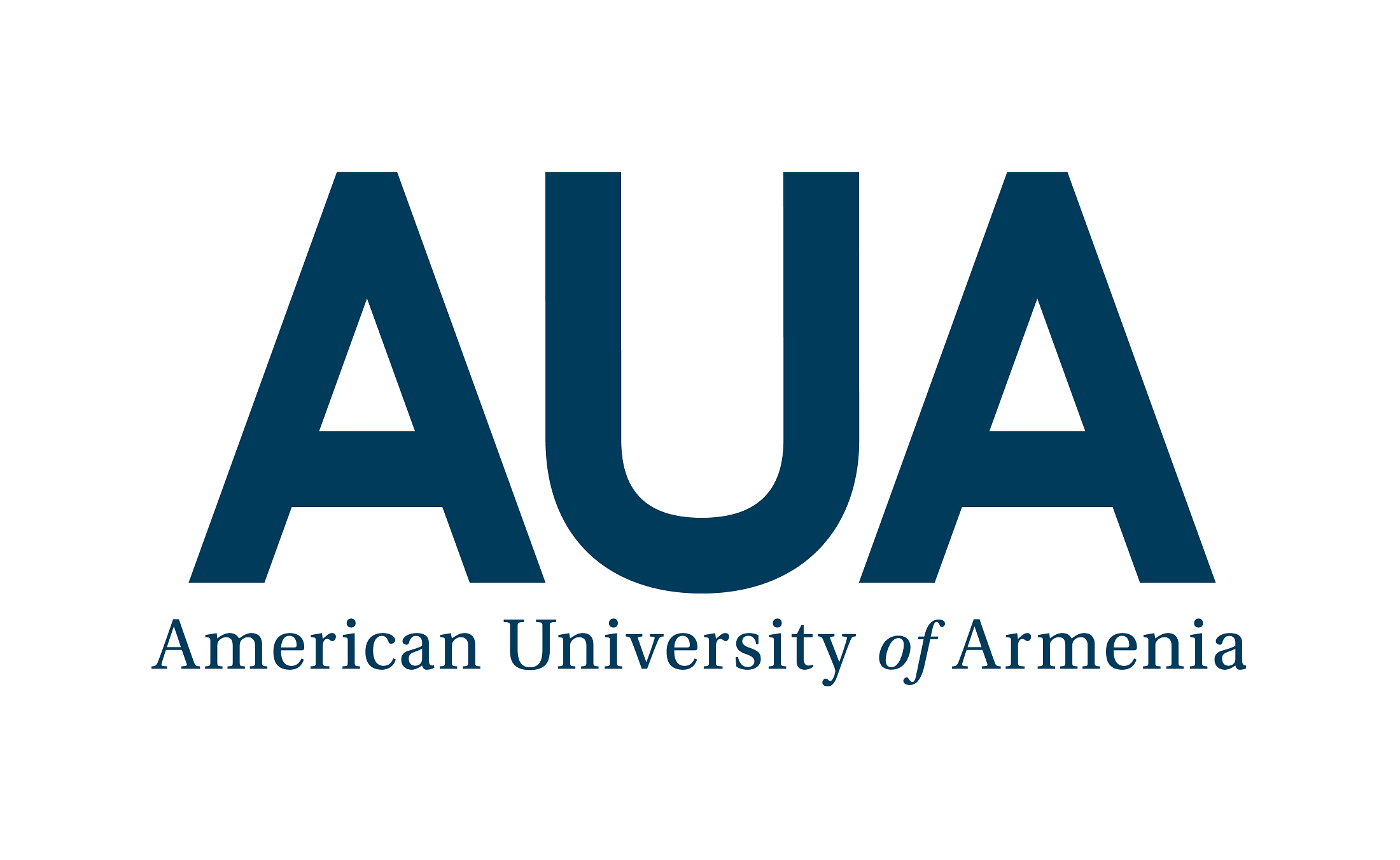
- AUA visual identifier
- Motto: Aspire, Inspire, Achieve
- Type: Private
- Established: September 21, 1991; 35 years ago
- Accreditation: WSCUC
- Affiliations: University of California
- Endowment: $118 million (2024)
- President: Bruce M. Boghosian
- Academic staff: 350 (fall 2024)
- Administrative staff: 218 (fall 2024)
- Students: 2,823
- Undergraduates: 2,272 (fall 2025)
- Postgraduates: 551 (fall 2025)
- Location: Yerevan, Armenia; 40°11′35.85″N 44°30′16.26″E
- Campus: Urban
- Colours
- Website: aua.am

University rankings

Regional – Overall
- QS Emerging Europe and Central Asia: 301-350 (2022)

The American University of Armenia (AUA) (Armenian: Հայաստանի ամերիկյան համալսարան, ՀԱՀ; Hayastani amerikyan hamalsaran, HAH) is a private, independent university in Yerevan, Armenia that is accredited by the Western Association of Schools and Colleges Senior College and University Commission. It is the first U.S.-accredited institution in the former Soviet Union that provides undergraduate and graduate education.

It was founded in 1991, the first year of Armenia's independence, by the Armenian General Benevolent Union (AGBU), the University of California (UC), and the Armenian government. The university is the country's first institution modeled on Western-style higher education. Committed to teaching, research, and service, it offers 12 master's and 9 bachelor's degrees.

== History ==
=== Origins ===
The idea of opening an American-style institution of higher education in Armenia originated in the late 1980s. When Armenia was struck by a devastating earthquake in 1988 the country, then still part of the Soviet Union, was opened to unprecedented international humanitarian and technical assistance. A number of earthquake engineers from the West helped in the reconstruction of the disaster zone. In 1989, Yuri Sarkissian, then rector of the Yerevan Polytechnic Institute, proposed to Armen Der Kiureghian, Professor of Civil Engineering at the University of California, Berkeley, the establishment of a Western-style Armenian technical university to advance higher education in Armenia. Der Kiureghian and another earthquake engineer, Mihran Agbabian, Professor Emeritus at the University of Southern California, set out to realize that goal. A number of American and Armenian academics supported the concept of the university. Der Kiureghian and Agbabian, along with the late Stepan Karamardian, formerly Dean of the A. Gary Anderson Graduate School of Management at the University of California, Riverside, presented their proposal to the Armenian government. Agbabian became the founding president in 1991 and served until 1997.

The Armenian General Benevolent Union (AGBU) and the University of California (UC) helped realize AUA. The Armenian government—in particular the Ministry of Higher Education and Sciences (now the Ministry of Education and Science)—offered financial and logistical support for the university despite the turbulent political and economic circumstances in Armenia between 1989 and 1991. The AGBU underwrote a significant portion of the operational funding; when UC was asked for its assistance in founding the university, its president David P. Gardner appointed a task force led by Senior Vice President for Academic Affairs William R. Frazer to evaluate the possibility of an affiliation between AUA and UC. After the task force's visit to Armenia in July 1990, the Regents of the University of California voted unanimously in favor of an affiliation, through which UC provides technical support and experience for the growth of AUA and collaborates with AUA in preparing its faculty.

=== First years ===
The university was formally established on September 21, 1991, the day Armenia held an independence referendum, and opened two days later. AUA began instruction with 101 students, who were enrolled in an intensive English-language program, which later grew into three graduate degree programs. In 1993, AUA's first commencement took place when 38 students received graduate degrees in Business and Management, Industrial Engineering, and Earthquake Engineering. AUA Extension, a program offering short courses and training programs, was established in 1992.

=== Expansion ===
The university introduced an undergraduate program in 2013, accepting some 300 students in the initial cohort.

== Campus and estate ==
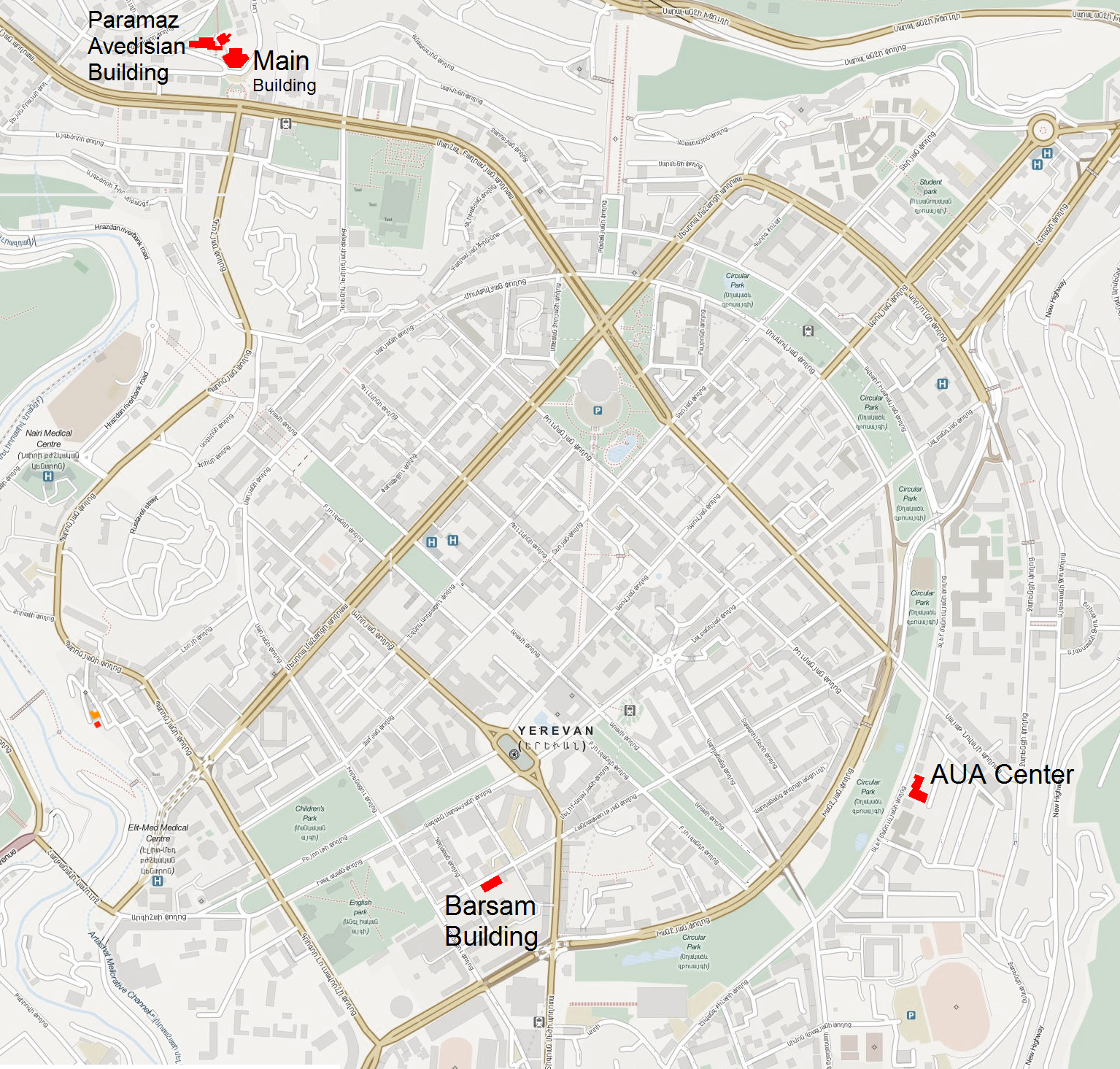
Locations of AUA buildings in central Yerevan

The university's two central buildings, the Main Building and the Paramaz Avedisian Building, are located at 40 Marshal Baghramyan Avenue in central Yerevan.

=== Main building ===
The university's main building, informally known as the "old building" (հին մասնաշենք), housed the Political Enlightenment House of the Central Committee of the Armenian Communist Party during the Soviet period. It was granted to the AUA on September 21, 1991, by the government. The six-story building comprises lecture halls, auditoriums, laboratories, library facilities, classrooms, and administrative offices. The main building is equipped with rooftop solar panels with a capacity of approximately 50 kWh and a photoelectric output of 5 kWh.

=== Paramaz Avedisian Building ===
Construction on the Paramaz Avedisian Building (PAB) began in 2005. It was designed by Gagik Galstyan and opened its doors on November 1, 2008. Located next to the main building, it encompasses 100,000 sq ft (9,300 square metres) of space, housing classrooms, seminar rooms, laboratories, research centers, and faculty offices. Built in 2018, AUA's Student Union adjoins the Paramaz Avedisian Building (PAB).

=== AUA Center ===
AUA Center is located at 9 Alex Manoogian Street in central Yerevan. It is a multiple-use rental facility suitable for business or not-for-profit organizations. It has two conference and meeting rooms and a large auditorium. The center was established in 1999 through the financial support of the U.S. government.

=== AUA Vartkes and Hasmig Barsam Building ===
In 2005, AUA acquired the Hye Business Suites Hotel at 8 Mher Mkrtchyan Street in central Yerevan through a donation by Vartkes Barsam. The hotel accommodates visiting faculty and students while generating additional income for the university. The United States Agency for International Development (USAID) awarded $300,000 to renovate and upgrade the building.

=== Dzoragyugh Buildings ===
Two buildings were donated by philanthropists K. George and Dr. Carolann Najarian in 2016. Following the completion of AUA's Student Residence, construction began on the Najarian Center for Social Entrepreneurship in 2021. Many of the university's journalism and writing courses are taught there.

=== AGBU Papazian Library ===
Founded alongside AUA in 1991, the AGBU Papazian Library bears the name of the Papazian family in recognition of their generous support to the university. As of June 2024 the library held 30,676 printed books, 672,058 digital resources, and various media formats including CDs, DVDs, and cassettes. The library has received significant donations from notable Armenian Americans, including historian Richard G. Hovannisian who donated 1,338 books, and scholar Vartan Gregorian, who donated over 600 primarily English-language titles in 2014.

=== Triangle Garden ===
In June 2026, the university inaugurated the Triangle Garden, marking the completion of a six-year landscape project. The park, planted with more than 120 trees and green spaces, was designed to provide a sustainable, climate-resilient environment for students, local residents, and the broader Yerevan community. Among those attending the inauguration was Dutch landscape architect Ruud Dubbeld of MTD Landscapers, who led the park's award-winning design.

== Accreditation ==
The AUA was accredited by the Western Association of Schools and Colleges (WASC) Senior College and University Commission in 2006. It received candidacy status for accreditation in 2002, becoming the first university in the former Soviet Union to be accredited by a U.S. educational institution. Accreditation means degrees issued by the AUA have a status equal to those issued in the U.S. By 2013, the university had received accreditation from WASC and a license from the Armenian Ministry of Education and Science to offer four-year education.

== Notable alumni ==
- David Akopyan, the United Nations Development Programme (UNDP) Resident Representative a.i. in Syria, graduated from Master of Business Administration (MBA) program in 1993
- Emil Babayan, Deputy Prosecutor General (since 2013) who holds a degree of Master of Laws from 2001
- Sedrak Barseghyan, Adviser to the Minister-Chief of Government Staff of Armenia (since 2013). Class of 2009.
- Lilit Galstian, a member of parliament from the Armenian Revolutionary Federation (2007–2012) who graduated from the faculty of Political Sciences and International Relations in 1996
- Tevan Poghosyan, a member of parliament from the Heritage party (since 2012) who graduated from the faculty of Political Sciences and International Relations in 1996
- Hovhannes Avoyan, chief executive officer and Founder of Picsart, who graduated as a Master of Political Sciences and International Relations in 1995.
- Artashes Emin, translator, former Honorary Consul of Canada. Graduated as a Master of Law in 1999.
- Anahit Avanesian, Armenian Minister of Health
- Anna Simonyan, Federal MP Candidate for Bloc Quebecois & Commission Members and founder of Clove a start up with offices in Yerevan, Montreal and San Francisco. Graduated with an MBA in 2001.
- Dalita Avanesian, Armenian singer and actor.

== Colleges and schools ==
- Zaven & Sonia Akian College of Science & Engineering
- Manoogian Simone College of Business & Economics
- College of Humanities & Social Sciences
- Gerald & Patricia Turpanjian School of Public Health

=== Undergraduate programs ===
- Bachelor of Arts in Business
- Bachelor of Arts in English and Communications
- Bachelor of Arts in Politics and Governance
- Bachelor of Science in Computer Science
- Bachelor of Science in Engineering Sciences
- Bachelor of Science in Data Science
- Bachelor of Science in Nursing
- Bachelor of Science in Environmental and Sustainability Science
- Bachelor of Science in Economics

=== Graduate programs ===
- Master of Business Administration
- Master of Science in Economics
- Master of Science in Management
- Master of Engineering in Industrial Engineering and Systems Management
- Master of Science in Computer and Information Science
- Master of Political Science and International Affairs
- Master of Arts in Teaching English as a Foreign Language
- Master of Laws
- Master of Public Health
- Master of Arts in Human Rights and Social Justice
- Master of Arts in Multiplatform Journalism

=== Certificate Programs ===
- Graduate Certificate in Teaching English as a Foreign Language
- Graduate Certificate in Translation
- Graduate Certificate in Finance
- Graduate Certificate in Data Analytics
- Certificate in Hotel and Hospitality Management
- Executive Certificate in Management

== Presidents ==
1. Mihran Agbabian (1991–1997)
2. Haroutune Armenian (1997–2009)
3. Bruce M. Boghosian (2009–2014)
4. Armen Der Kiureghian (2015–2019)
5. Karin Markides (2019–2022)
6. Armen Der Kiureghian (interim, 2022–2023)
7. Bruce M. Boghosian (2023–present)

== Rankings and reputation ==
The American University of Armenia is widely considered as one of the top universities in Armenia. It has been described as such by former Education Minister Armen Ashotyan (2009–2016), the U.S. Embassy in Armenia, Armenian Weekly, the Armenian service of Radio Free Europe/Radio Liberty, independent news agency CivilNet, and other media outlets. AUA is the top private university nationally, ranked #2 after Yerevan State University, and #39 in Europe University Rankings and Western Asia in 2025.

Year	Source	Rank nationally	Rank globally
2014	Armenian government	2	—
2015	Webometrics Ranking of World Universities	2	3887

According to a 2009 business report by Michigan State University, "the only reputable MBA program in Armenia is offered at the American University of Armenia". A report titled "Corruption Levies Heavy Toll on Armenian Universities" by the Embassy of the United States to Armenia, notes that AUA is seen by its alumni as the only "clean", non-corrupt university where "student assessment is performance based". As of 2004, the AUA was one of four universities in Armenia teaching public administration.

At his 2015 AUA Commencement Speech, U.S. Ambassador Richard Mills said: "AUA is like no other university in Armenia. At no other school are you challenged to think critically like you are here. As an extension of our well-regarded University of California system, AUA has planted and nurtured informed critical thinking skills that will stand you in good stead throughout the rest of your lives."

At a June 1994 fundraising banquet for the AUA, U.S. Ambassador to Armenia Harry Gilmore stated that the university was one of the "islands of light" in an Armenia caught in war and economic hardship, where people had been living without heat and light for several years. Gilmore praised the university as follows:

To me, the American University of Armenia exemplifies what is best about Armenian education. When you walk in the doors of the American University, you feel a sense of energy, of purpose. When you look in the computer lab, and see the students at work stations, you could be in any American University. But I think there are very few universities in the United States where the students work with such dedication and enthusiasm. There is another difference--when you talk to the students, you learn they are not there just for themselves, they are there because they want to make Armenia a better place to live for future generations.

== Notable visitors and speakers ==
Notable individuals who have visited the university and/or have given lectures include:

- Chairman of the House Foreign Affairs Committee Ed Royce (April 2014);
- Rock singer Serj Tankian (April 2015);
- Third President of Armenia Serzh Sargsyan (July 2015);
- Former Governor of Massachusetts and the 1988 Democratic nominee for President Michael Dukakis (April 2016);
- Democratic Representative from California Jim Costa (July 2016);
- Russian nuclear physicist Yuri Oganessian (September 2016);
- American-Armenian Nobel Laureate Ardem Patapoutian (June 2022);
- Nobel Laureate Emmanuelle Charpentier (September 2022);
- NASA Engineer Nagin Cox (September 2022);
- International Legal Expert Lyal S. Sunga (October 2023);
- Environmental activist Greta Thunberg (November 2024);
- Turkish-German historian and sociologist Taner Akçam (April 2025);

== Politics ==
Several months after the violent crackdown of opposition protests on March 1, 2008, AUA, among other prominent institutions, refused to rent meeting space to opposition groups and democracy advocates under government pressure, according to Joseph Pennington, Deputy Chief of Mission at the U.S. Embassy in Yerevan.

On May 2, 2018, during the Velvet Revolution, a long list of AUA faculty members signed an open letter "unequivocally support[ing] the Armenian people's peaceful movement to restore social democratic values and fair, transparent elections." The letter added: "We support the students, workers, and other citizens of Armenia who are collectively saying no to oligarchic rule, corruption, a biased judiciary, and other socio-economic injustices."

== Gallery ==
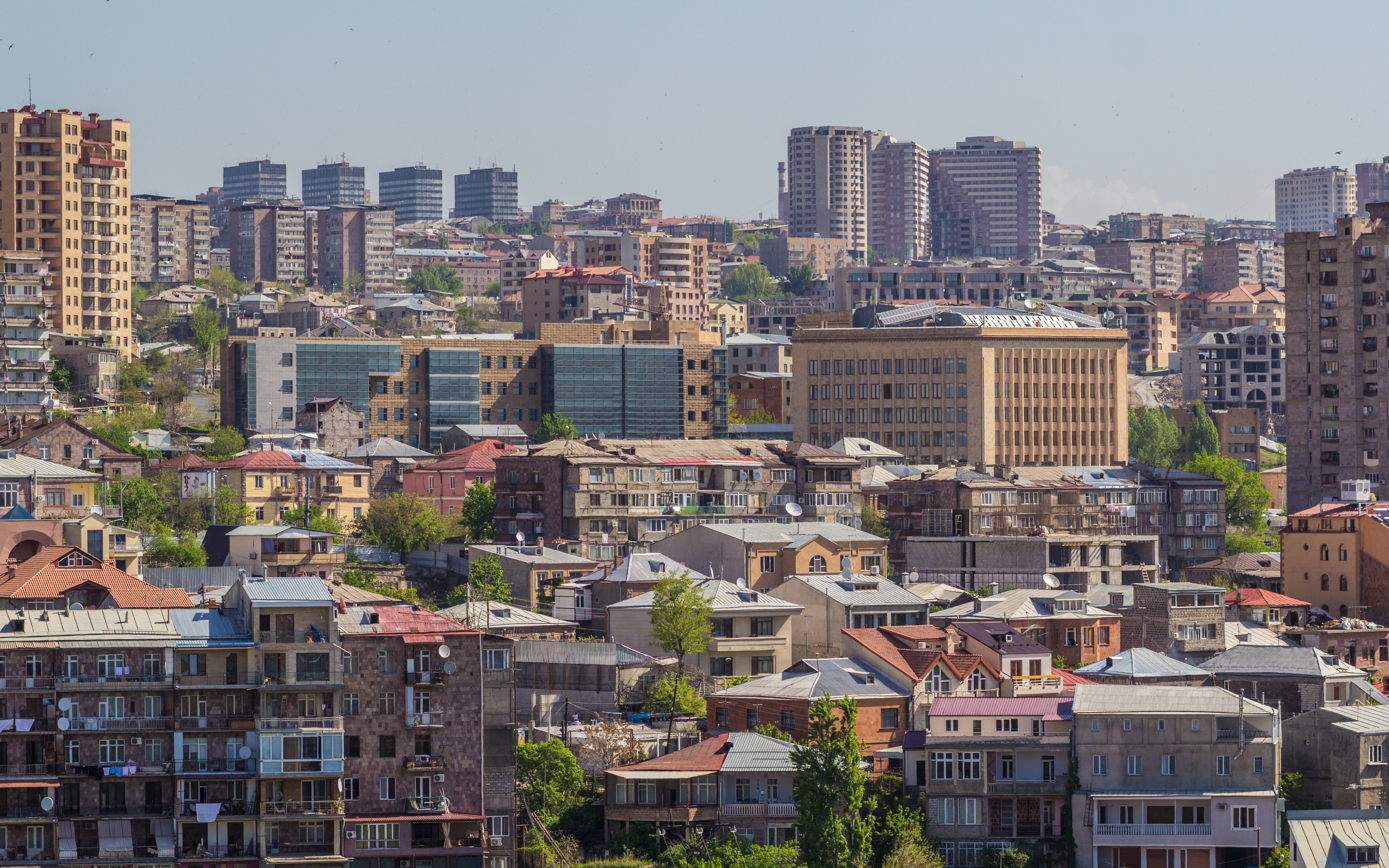
The AUA buildings and the surrounding neighborhood

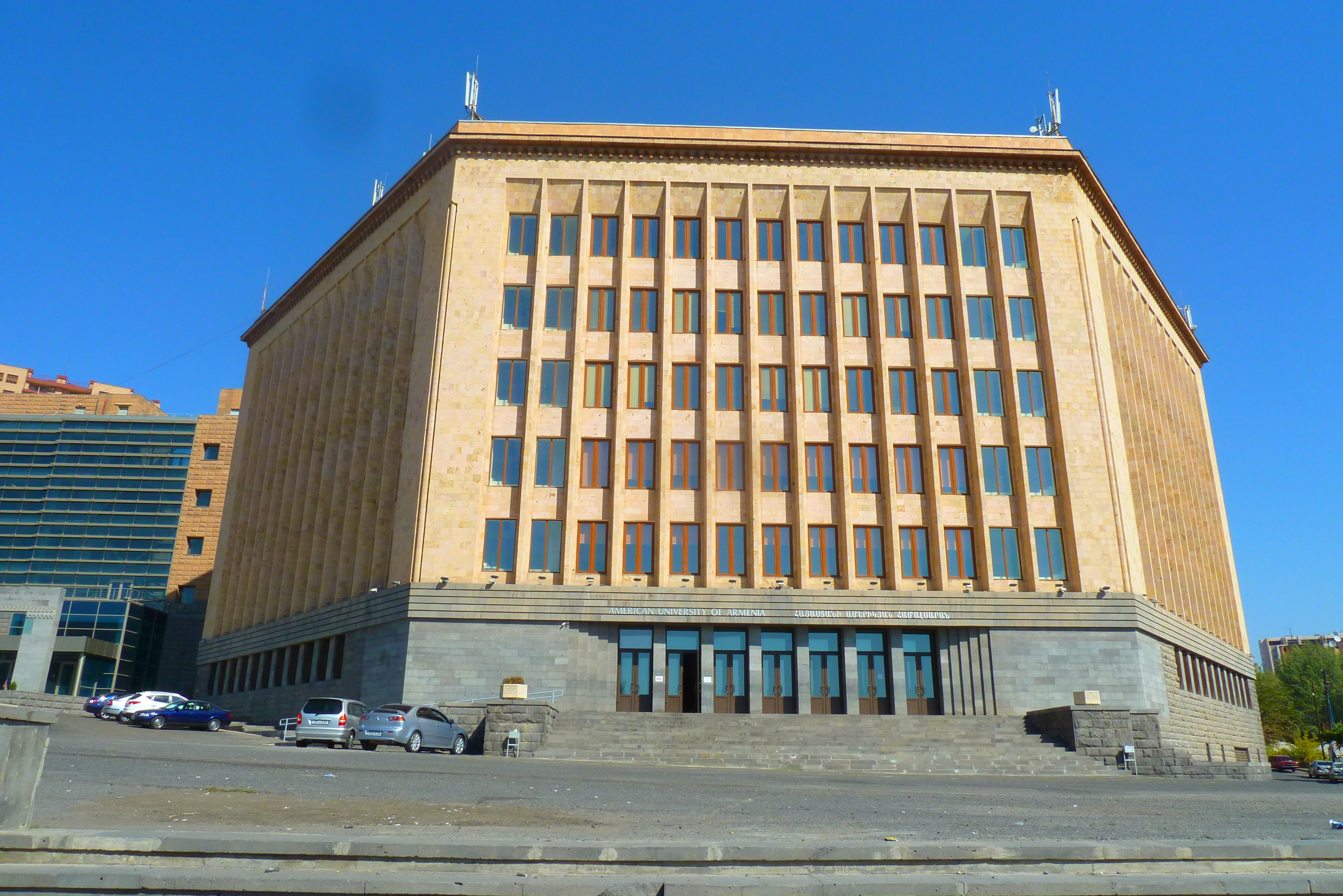
Main Building

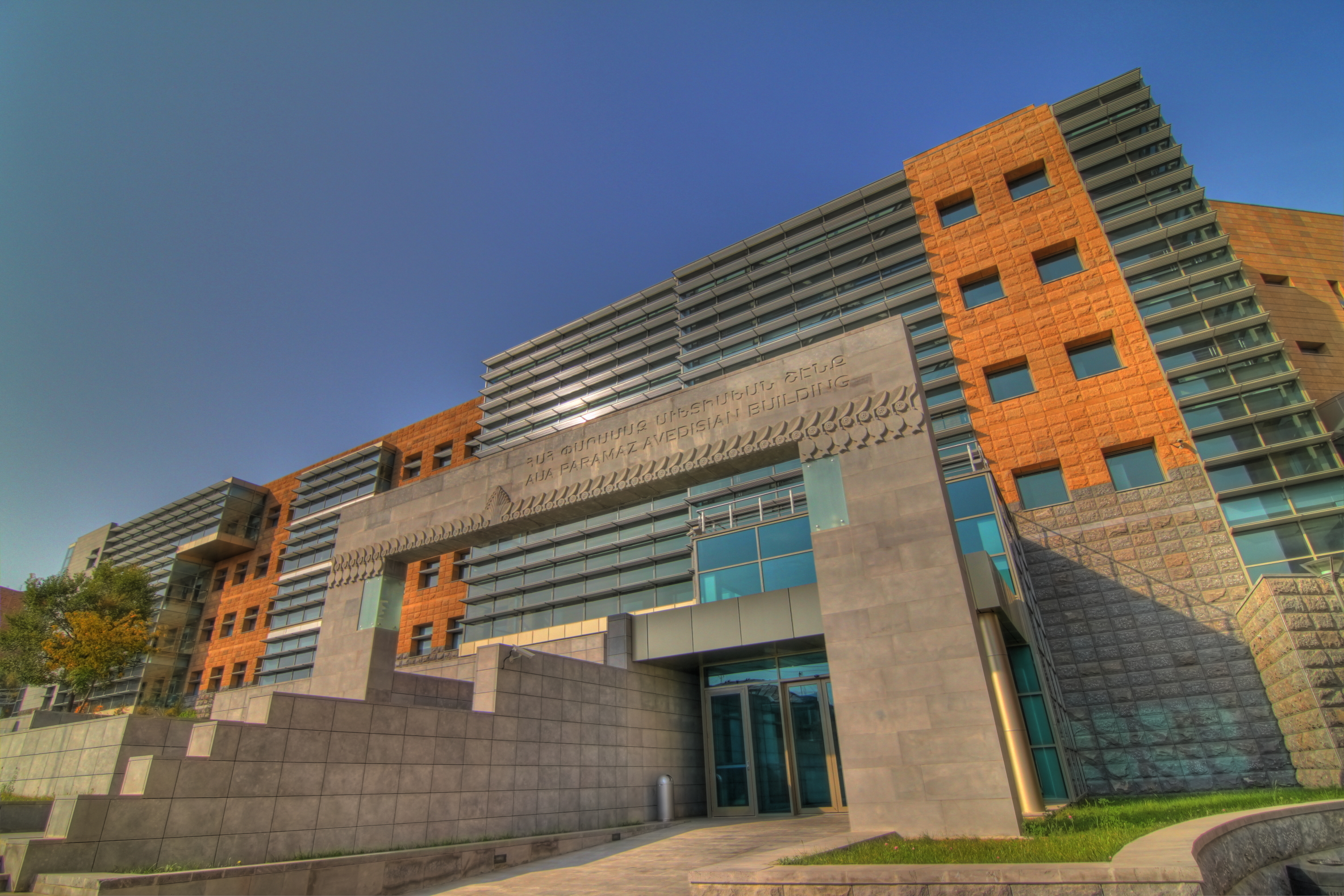
Paramaz Avedisian Building entrance

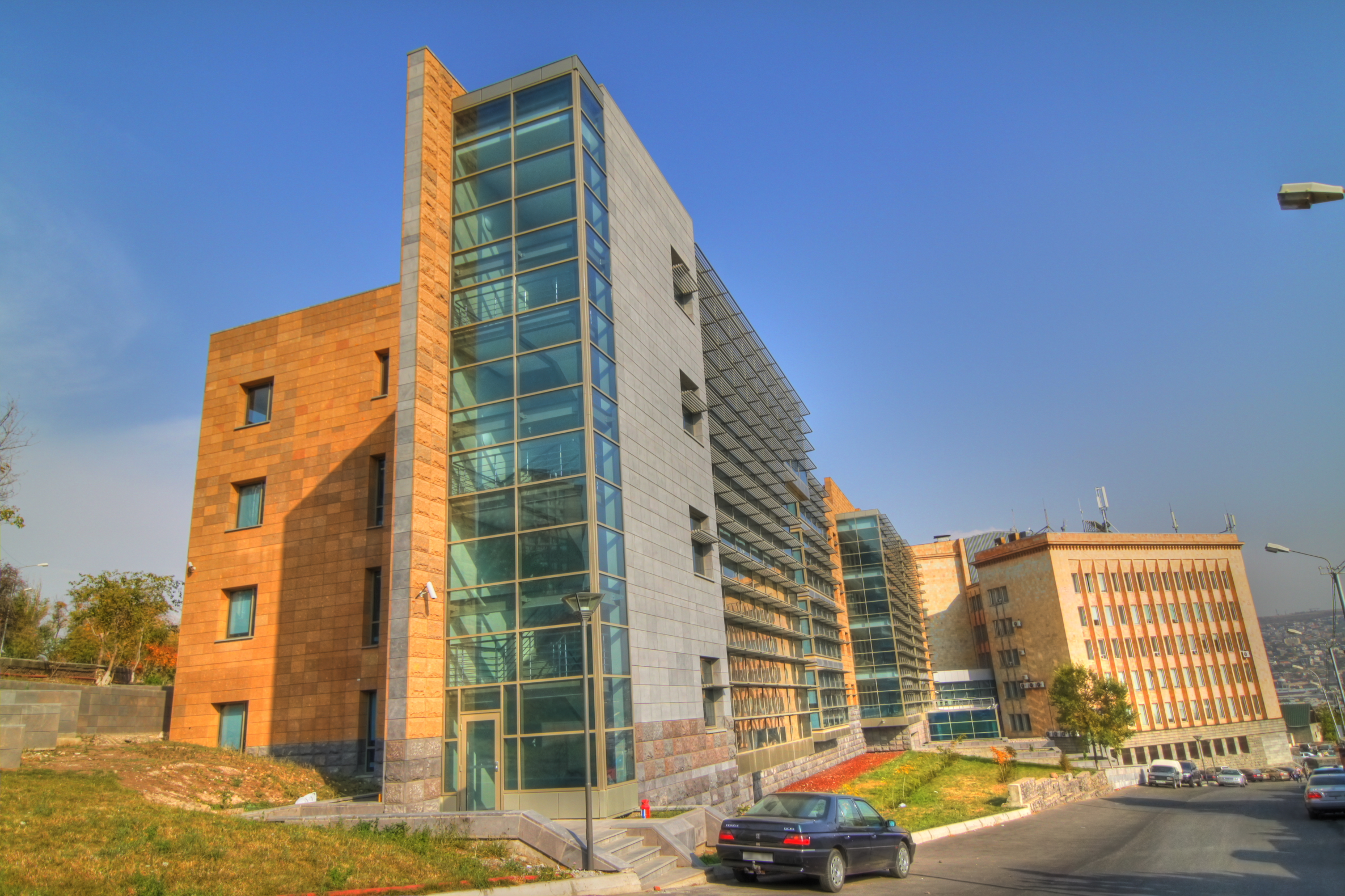
A general view of the Paramaz Avedisian Building and the Main Building

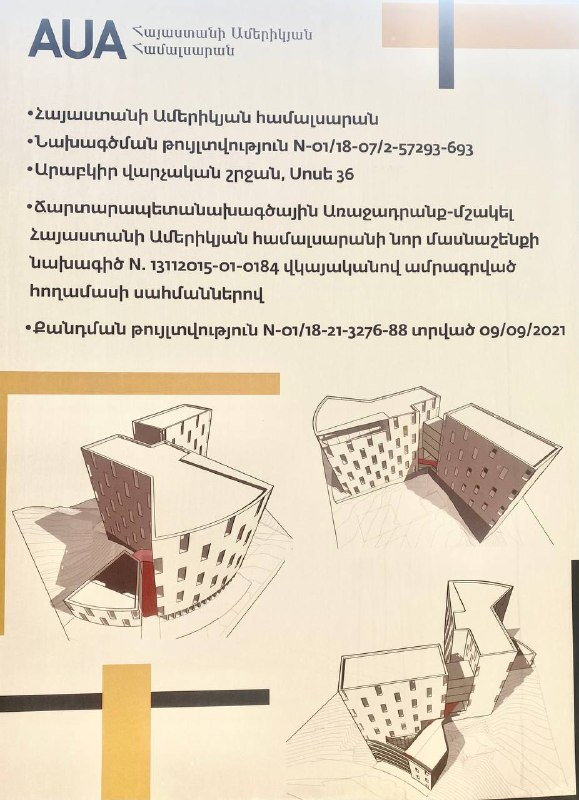
Pamela and Edward Avedisian building

== See also ==
- Education in Armenia

Other foreign universities in Armenia

- Fondation Université Française en Arménie
- Russian-Armenian (Slavonic) University
- Yerevan Education and Research Institute of West Ukrainian National University

Other American universities

- American University of Beirut, Lebanon
- American University of Central Asia in Bishkek, Kyrgyzstan
- American University in Cairo
- BYU Jerusalem Center
- American University of Paris
- American University in Dubai
- American University in Bulgaria
- Ukrainian-American Concordia University in Kyiv, Ukraine
- American University of Moldova in Chișinău
- Romanian-American University in Bucharest
- Georgian American University in Tbilisi
