= Sumbat Der Kiureghian =

Iranian–American watercolor artist

Sumbat Der Kiureghian Սմբատ Տէր-Կիւրեղեան
- Born: October 19, 1913; New Julfa, Isfahan, Iran
- Died: June 9, 1999 (aged 85); Los Angeles, United States
- Occupation: artist

Sumbat Der Kiureghian (Armenian: Սմբատ Տէր-Կիւրեղեան; October 19, 1913 – June 9, 1999) was a 20th-century Iranian–Armenian watercolor artist.

== Biography ==
Sumbat Der Kiureghian was born on October 19, 1913, in New Julfa (the Iranian city of Isfahan's Armenian quarter), in the family of Hovhannes Der Kiureghian and Tagouhi Haroutunian. Hovhannes was an auctioneer of specialty items and a watch repairman who died in 1915. Sumbat was raised by his mother, Tagouhi. Sumbat's grandfather Kiuregh served as a priest at the Sourb Hovhannes Church in New Julfa. The family took his priesthood name as their last name – Der Kiureghian ("Der" is the honorific title of a priest).

== Career ==
Sumbat received his early education in the Armenian school in New Julfa. In 1924, he exhibited his paintings at a school contest and won a prize. His art teachers at school were Yeghia Yegijanian and Hacop Vardanian. After graduating in 1929, Sumbat attended the Stuart Memorial English College for boys in Isfahan, where he learned English, Persian, and other subjects. Later, he enrolled in the art classes of Sarkis Khachadourian. Seeing Sumbat's abilities, Khachadourian recruited him as an apprentice to help him with his work. The experience had a tremendous influence on Sumbat, who opened his first studio on Charbagh Avenue at the age of seventeen. He used the studio both as a workplace and an exhibition hall. He also produced more popular handicraft items, such as painted vases and lampshades decorated with caravan scenes, and made designs of carpets. Sumbat's studio was a hangout for friends, and a group of them formed a musical band, in which Sumbat played the drums. In 1933, Sumbat closed his studio and entered compulsory military service. After completing military service in 1935, Sumbat opened his second studio on Charbagh Avenue – Negarestan-eh Sumbat (Sumbat's Art Studio). By the time he graduated from college, Sumbat had greatly improved his skills as a watercolorist with light and easy brushwork, pure and translucent colors.

Sumbat preferred exhibiting his paintings in his studio. He first participated in a formal exhibition of paintings in April 1944 at the Anglo-Persian Institute in Isfahan. His next exhibition was in February 1948 in Abadan, where all exhibited paintings were sold and Sumbat received many commissions.

Stanley Foster, an English consulting engineer for the AIOC and an amateur artist, had a profound influence on Sumbat's career. He offered Sumbat to fund a six-month journey through the Middle East and Europe to England. On June 18, 1949, Sumbat and Stanley began their journey from Abadan, and traveling through Iraq and Syria to Lebanon they arrived in Naples, Italy by boat, then went on to Rome, Florence, Venice and Paris, arriving in London on August 13. During their travels they visited museums and historical sites and made numerous sketches and paintings. Sumbat was able to observe the works of great impressionists such as Monet, Degas and Pissarro, postimpressionists such as Cézanne, Toulouse-Lautrec and Van Gogh, and renowned British watercolorist J. M. W. Turner, who remained his favorites all his life.

Sumbat and Stanley enrolled in the Anglo-French Art Centre in London, where Sumbat received his first formal training. In London, they visited art galleries, museums and artists. Upon seeing Sumbat's watercolors, British watercolorist Sir W. Russell Flint declared him "brother in brush." In 1950, Sumbat held an exhibition of his watercolors from his travels in Europe and England at the Art Centre in London.

After his European travels, Sumbat used his newspaper palette as his canvas. With a few brush strokes, the random mix of gouache colors and printed letters came alive, suggesting a crowd in a traditional Iranian bazaar. In time, this technique, popularly known as "Sumbatism", became one of Sumbat's signature styles.

In the 1960s, Sumbat had become a well-known artist of the watercolor medium in Iran. His studio had become an institution in Isfahan and a popular destination for art-loving visitors and tourists. In 1965, Sumbat was invited by ARAMCO to Saudi Arabia to exhibit his paintings and teach art in Ras Tanura and Dhahran. The Saudi landscape and culture further enriched his experience. Further exhibitions were held in 1971 in Tehran and in 1976 in Los Angeles, during his first visit to the United States. In 1978, a major retrospective of Sumbat's works along with those of three other Iranian watercolorists was held in Tehran.

To be with their children, Sumbat and his wife Arax moved to the United States in 1980.

In 1991, Sumbat travelled to his ancestral homeland Armenia, and he held a major exhibition in the National Gallery of Armenia.

In 1993, Sumbat travelled to Iran. In Tehran, he participated in an exhibition together with younger artists. He then visited his hometown New Julfa in Isfahan, where a special event had been organized in his honor.

== Death ==
Sumbat died in Los Angeles in 1999.

== Sumbat Studios and Gallery ==
- 1930–1971: Charbagh Avenue, Isfahan, Iran
- 1971–1980: Karimkhan Zand Avenue, Tehran, Iran
- 1981–1999: Brand Boulevard, Glendale, California, USA

== Family ==
On December 22, 1942, Sumbat married Arax Aftandilian. They had three children: Siroush (1945), Armen (1947), and Tagoush (1959).

== Bibliography ==
Bibliography
- Tghtakits, "Exhibition of Armenian Artist," Alik, April 27, 1949, Teheran, Iran (in Armenian).
- Tghtakits, "Cultural Life in Abadan," Hoosaber, May 26, 1949, Teheran, Iran (in Armenian).
- "Artist Sumbat Kiureghian is Going Abroad," Alik, June 19, 1949, Teheran, Iran (in Armenian).
- "Iranian-Armenian Artist Sumbat Kiureghian Recognized," Alik, 1955, Teheran, Iran (in Armenian).
- "Sumbat Exhibition in Abadan," Abadan Today, March 3, 1958, Abadan, Iran.
- "Exhibition of Paintings," Peik-e Naft, March 4, 1958, Abadan, Iran (in Persian).
- N. M., "Iranian-Armenian Artists: Sumbat Kiureghian of Isfahan," Alik, August 28, 1960, Teheran, Iran (in Armenian).
- Mubarak, "Art Exhibit in Ras Tanura," Sun & Flares, March 24, 1965, Saudi Arabia.
- "Ras Tanura Shows Off Its Artist," Sun & Flares, March 31, 1965, Saudi Arabia.
- "Kiureghian Set for Art Course," Sun & Flares, May 5, 1965, Saudi Arabia.
- "Isfahan Artist in Exhibition," Sun & Flares, June 30, 1965, Saudi Arabia.
- "Artist Presents Isfahan Scenes," Sun & Flares, July 7, 1965, Saudi Arabia.
- Sumbat Kiureghian, "Letter to Sun & Flare," Sun & Flares, August 25, 1965, Saudi Arabia.
- Abolhosein Sepanta, "Sumbat Kiureghian," Vaheed Weekly, 1965, Teheran, Iran (in Persian).
- A. Joughian, "The Modest Artist," Alik, October 23, 1965, Teheran, Iran (in Armenian).
- A. Tonoyan, "From the Depths of Iran: A Travelogue from Armenian Villages," Spiurk, September 22, 1966, Beirut, Lebanon (in Armenian). Describes seeing Sumbat painting in Drakhtak (paradise) village.
- Rev. N. Baghdikian, "In front of Ararat," Azdak, 1967 (series of 10 articles), Beirut, Lebanon (in Armenian). Describes travels with Sumbat in Northwestern Iran to visit ancient Armenian monasteries.
- Hrand Adjemian, "Our Notables: Sumbat Kiureghian," Ayg, September 26, 1970, Beirut, Lebanon (in Armenian).
- Hrand Adjemian, "With our Artists: Sumbat Kiureghian," Alik Patanekan, September 29, 1970, Beirut, Lebanon (in Armenian).
- Levon G. Minasian, "Iranian-Armenian Artists: Sumbat Kiureghian," Hoor Monthly, May 1972, Teheran, Iran, pp. 85–92 (in Armenian). Reprinted in Kulis, September 1972, Istanbul, Turkey.
- "Sumbat Kiureghian to Exhibit Art Work," The Armenian Observer, August 18, 1976, Los Angeles, CA.
- "Visit by Iranian-Armenian Artist Sumbat Kiureghian," Banber Monthly, June 1980, Armenian Society of Los Angeles, Los Angeles, CA (in Armenian).
- "Hamazkayin to Present Sumbat Kiureghian Exhibition," The Armenian Observer, May 7, 1980, Los Angeles, CA.
- T. Voskouni, "The Art of Sumbat Kiureghian," Asbarez, May 8, 1980, Los Angeles, CA (in Armenian).
- Mania Ghazarian, "Contemporary Iranian-Armenian Art," HayArvest, July 1, 1980, Los Angeles, CA (in Armenian).
- "World Renowned Artist Sargis Khachatourian," HayArvest, July 15, 1980, Los Angeles, CA (in Armenian). Describes Khachatourian's visit to Isfahan and tutoring of Sumbat.
- "Sumbat Kiureghian Exhibit at Los Angeles AGBU Gallery, Sept. 19–26," Asbarez, September 3, 1980, Los Angeles, CA.
- "Painter Sumbat Kiureghian to Exhibit at AGBU Gallery," Nor Gyank, September 4, 1980, Los Angeles, CA.
- H. Jack Aslanian, "Sumbat Kiureghian: His Art and His Technique," The Armenian Observer, August 19, 1981, Los Angeles, CA.
- Margit A. Hazarabedian, "Distinguished Contemporary Armenian Artists Exhibit at Berkeley, Sept. 11–13," Asbarez Weekly, September 5, 1981, Los Angeles, CA.
- "Miracle Hands," Iran Post, October 24, 1981, Beverly Hills, CA (in Persian).
- Don Jacobson, "For Sumbat, Art Still Is Life – Even When Starting Over," Glendale News Press, October 29, 1981, Glendale, CA.
- Ruben Amirian, "Sumbat Kiureghian, Watercolorist," Asbarez, November 7, 1981, Los Angeles, CA.
- "Sumbat's Art Continues," The Armenian Weekly, November 14, 1981, Boston, Mass.
- "Sumbat Kiureghian Exhibit in New York," The Armenian Observer, November 25, 1981, Los Angeles, CA.
- "Artist Sumbat Kiureghian Exhibits in New York Prelacy Hall," Hayrenik, November 28, 1981, Boston, Mass. (in Armenian).
- "Kiureghian at the Prelacy," The Armenian Weekly, November 28, 1981, Boston, Mass.
- "Sumbat Kiureghian Prelacy Art Exhibit to Open Dec. 4," The Armenian Reporter, November 26, 1981, New York, NY.
- Levon Keshishian, "Armenian World," The Armenian Observer, December 23, 1981, Los Angeles, CA. Mentions Sumbat's exhibit in New York.
- Garnik Stepanian, "Biographical Encyclopedia," Entry on Sumbat Kiureghian, Vol. 2, page 115, Yerevan, Armenia.
- "A Successful Painting Exhibition," Asbarez, October 7, 1982, Los Angeles, CA (in Armenian).
- Julie Kulhanjian, "The Watercolors of Sumbat Kiureghian," Asbarez, July 3, 1982, Los Angeles, CA.
- "ART: Sumbat Kiureghian's Paintings," Nor Gyank, January 14, 1982, Los Angeles, CA.
- "Kiureghian Exhibit in San Francisco," The Armenian Observer, November 17, 1982, Los Angeles, CA.
- "...Homeland...Diaspora...Homeland...Diaspora...Homeland...," Horizon, December 21–28, 1982, Montreal, Canada (in Armenian).
- Yeznig Balaian, "Exceptional Gala Event for Krouzian-Zekarian Armenian School," Asbarez, April 27, 1984, Los Angeles, CA (in Armenian). Describes presentation of Sumbat's painting to California Governor George Deukmejian on behalf of the Armenian community of San Francisco.
- Jerair Gharibian, "Art in Review: Sumbat Kiureghian, Watercolorist Coming to Boston," The Armenian Weekly, October 19, 1985.
- "Report – Painting Exhibition," Nor Gyank, February 23, 1984, Los Angeles, CA (in Armenian).
- Jerair Gharibian, "Renowned Artist, Sumbat Kiureghian's Exhibition in Boston," Hayrenik, October 18, 1985, Boston, Mass. (in Armenian).
- Vahan Harutyunian, "Glowing Spontaneous Art," Kroonk, January 1986, Yerevan, Armenia.
- Vahan Harutyunian, "Spontaneous Impressions," Sovetakan Hayastan, January 1986, Yerevan, Armenia (in Armenian).
- Hrand Adjemian, "Artist Sumbat Kiureghian – on Occasion of his 75th Birthday," Hay Gyank Weekly, December 30, 1988, Los Angeles, CA (in Armenian).
- Janet Lazarian, "Iranian Artists on the Other Side of the World," Donia-ye Sokhan, May 1989, Teheran, Iran (in Persian).
- Hrand Adjemian, "Artist Sumbat Kiureghian," Outreach, December 1989, New York, NY (in Armenian).
- J. Ariapour, Iranian Watercolor, Sirang Publishers, Teheran, Iran, 1990 (in Persian and English). Includes 19 large reproductions of Sumbat's paintings together with 6 of Misha Shahbazian, 3 of Ali-Akbar Sanati, 7 of Yervand Nahapetian, and 7 of Hacop Vartanian.
- Tatevik Garanfilian, "First Time in Homeland," Hayreniki Dzayn, June 26, 1991, Yerevan, Armenia (in Armenian).
- Janet Samuelian, "Sumbat Der Kiureghian Takes Old Iran to New Armenia," The Armenian Observer, July 31, 1991, Los Angeles, CA.
- "With the Iranian-Armenian Artist-Painter Sumbat Kiureghian," Alik, November 29, 1993, Teheran, Iran (in Armenian).
- H. L. Pahlevanian, "Armenian Artist Sumbat Kiureghian," Azdarar Gazette, February 1996, Seattle, WA (in Armenian and English).
- Shnorhik Nazarian, "Idyllic Painter: Sumbat Kiureghian," Navasard Monthly, March–April 1997, Los Angeles, CA (in Armenian).
- Alice Navasargian, Iran-Armenia Golden Bridges: 20th Century Iranian-Armenian Painters, AAA Publishing House (Canada), Glendale, CA., 1997, pp 78–81.
- "Renowned Artist Sumbat Kiureghian Passes Away," Asbarez, June 11, 1999, Los Angeles, CA (in Armenian and English).
- "Iranian-Armenian Artist-Painter Sumbat Der Kiureghian Passes Away," Alik, June 12, 1999, Teheran, Iran (in Armenian).
- "Artist Who Was in Love with the Soil and Sun of Iran and Isfahan Passes Away," Arya, June 20, 1999, Teheran, Iran (in Persian).
- "The Sound of Breeze and Flow of Water in the Works of an Artist Who is No More with Us," Iran, June 25, 1999, Teheran, Iran (in Persian).
- Hrand Adjemian, "In Memory of Artist Sumbat Kiureghian," Nor Gyank, June 24, 1999, Los Angeles, CA (in Armenian).
- Janet Samuelian, "Artist Sumbat Der Kiureghian Felled by Heart Attack," The Armenian Reporter, June 26, 1999, New York, NY.
- Editorial "We Mourn", Azdarar, June 1999, Seattle, WA (in Armenian).
- "The passing of Painter Sumbat Kiureghian," Teghekatou, Armenian Society of Los Angeles, July 1999, Los Angeles, CA (in Armenian).
- Andranik Saryan, "Sumbat Kiureghian: On the Occasion of the 40th Day of His Death," Nor Gyank, July 15, 1999, Los Angeles, CA (in Armenian).
- Grish Davtian, "In Memory of Artist Sumbat Der Kiureghian," Asbarez, July 17, 1999, Los Angeles, CA (in Armenian).
- "An Evening in Honor of Sumbat Kiureghian's Memory," Alik, October 4, 1999, Teheran, Iran (in Armenian).
- "An Evening in Honor of Sumbat Kiureghian's Memory," Asbarez, October 7, 1999, Los Angeles, CA (in Armenian).
- Mari Rose Abousefian, "Painter Sumbat Der Kiureghian from the Viewpoint of His Granddaughter Naira Der Kiureghian," Asbarez, November 18, 1999, Los Angeles, CA (in Armenian).
- Naira Der Kiureghian, "My Grand Father, Sumbat-Jan" Asbarez, November 18, 1999, Los Angeles, CA (in Armenian).
- Levon G. Minasian, "Alas Our Master Painter Sumbat Der Kiureghian," Alik, January 10, 2000, Teheran, Iran (in Armenian).
- Janet D. Lazarian (compiler), Encyclopedia of Iranian Armenians, Hirmand Publishers, Teheran, Iran, 2003, pp 35, 336, 346 (in Persian).
- Leonardo Alishan, "Images of New Julfa: Sumbat's Paintings and Some Remembrances," paper presented at Armenian New Julfa: The Fourth Centennial, 1604/5-2004, UCLA International Conference Series on Historic Armenian Cities and Provinces, November 14–16, 2003, University of California, Los Angeles, CA.
- Hay Arvest, February 2004, Yerevan, Armenia. Depicts reproductions of paintings by Sumbat Der Kiureghian, Yervand Nahapetian and Mikayel Shahbazian in a special issue celebrating the fourth centennial of New Julfa (in Armenian).
- Selected Pintings of Sumbat Der Kiureghian, Negar Books, Tehran, Iran, 2005, 77 pages, with introduction by Manuchehr Mughari (in English and Persian, ISBN 964-5520-63-0).
- Ani Babaian, "Distinguished Watercolor Artists of Isfahan," Persian Art International Magazine, Vol. 2, No. 8, May–June 2006, pp 13–16 (in Persian).
- The Glory of Persian Watercolor, Negar Books, Tehran, Iran, 2006, pp. 242–257 (in Persian and English, ISBN 964-5520-96-7).
- "The first Exhibition of Armenian Artists in Tehran," Fogholadeh, Vol. 28, No. 1.466, December 21, 2008, p 20 (in Farisi).
- Tania Ketenjian, "Sumbat: a way of seeing," Armenian Reporter, Arts & Culture, August 23, 2008, p C8.
- Der Kiureghian Armen "The Life and Art of Sumbat", San Francisco-Yerevan 2009, 174 pages (ISBN 978-0-578-03598-7).
- Elaine Krikorian, "Sumbat, an artist who captured village life in Iran," Armenian Reporter, Arts & Culture, December 19, 2009, p 12-13.
