= Amy Q. Shen =

Mechanical engineer

Amy Shen
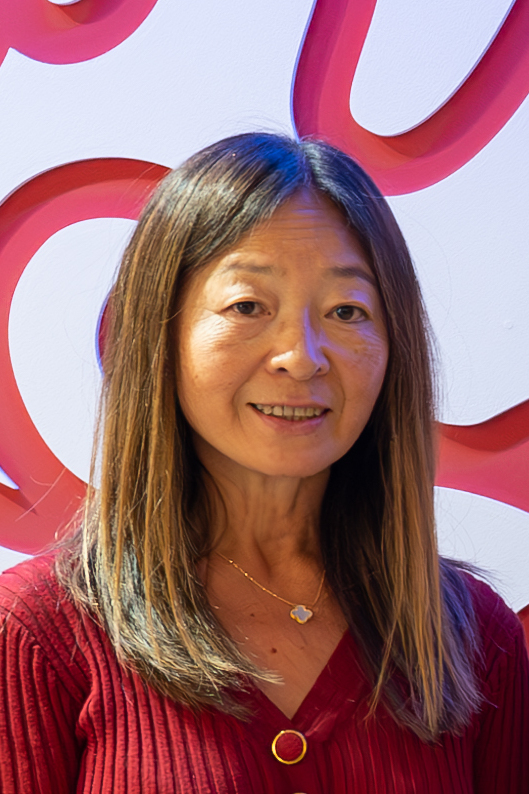
- Shen in 2025
- Education: Hunan University; Tongji University; University of Illinois
- Scientific career
- Workplaces: Harvard University; Washington University; University of Washington; OIST

Amy Q. Shen is a mechanical engineer whose research concerns the rheology of non-Newtonian fluids and complex fluids, microfluids, biofluids, nanofluids, and their interfaces. Shen is originally from China, and was educated in China and the US. She works in Japan as the provost of the Okinawa Institute of Science and Technology, where she is also a professor and head of the Micro/Bio/Nanofluidics Unit.

== Education and career ==
Shen was a student of engineering mechanics in a special class for the gifted at Hunan University in Changsha, China, where she received a bachelor's degree in 1992. After a master's degree in engineering mechanics in 1994 from Tongji University in Shanghai, she came to the US for graduate study at the University of Illinois Urbana-Champaign. She received a second master's degree there in 1996, in civil and environmental engineering, and then completed her Ph.D. in theoretical and applied mechanics in 2000. Her doctoral advisor was Sigurdur Thoroddsen.

Shen spent two years as a postdoctoral researcher at Harvard University, working there with Howard A. Stone and Gareth H. McKinley. She worked as an assistant professor of mechanical and aerospace engineering at the McKelvey School of Engineering of Washington University in St. Louis from 2002 until 2008, when she moved to the University of Washington is a tenured associate professor of mechanical engineering. In 2014 she moved to her present position at the Okinawa Institute of Science and Technology, continuing to hold an adjunct professor affiliation at the University of Washington.

She became provost of the Okinawa Institute of Science and Technology in 2022.

== Recognition ==
Shen was elected as a Fellow of the American Physical Society (APS) in 2021, after a nomination from the APS Division of Fluid Dynamics, "for contributions to our understanding of bifurcations and instabilities in flows of complex fluids at small length scales, and for the design of ingenious microfluidic experiments". She is a Fellow of the Society of Rheology, elected in 2022, and a Fellow of the Royal Society of Chemistry, elected in 2021.
