= Karin Markides =

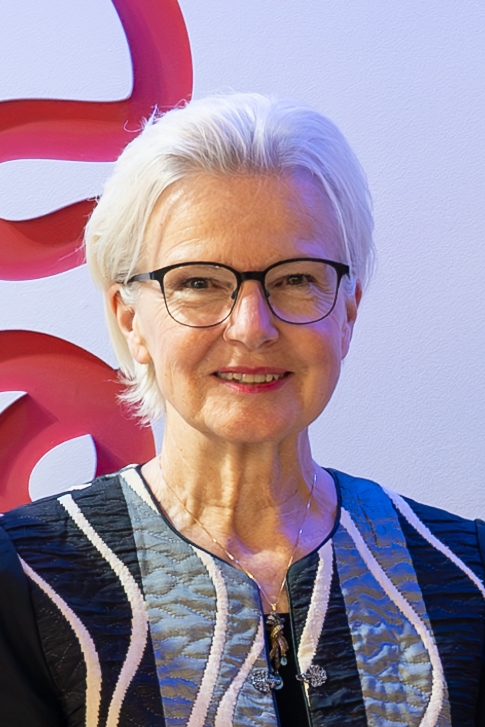
- Karin Markides in 2025
- Scientific career
- Fields: Analytical Chemistry
- Workplaces: Okinawa Institute of Science and Technology
- Thesis: Organosiloxanes containing cyano groups for capillary chromatography (1984)

Karin Markides, born 1951, is a Swedish professor in analytical chemistry and president and CEO of Okinawa Institute of Science and Technology from 1 June 2023. She was the president of American University of Armenia from 1 July 2019 to 2 December 2022. She was also the president and CEO of Chalmers University of Technology from 2006 to 2015. From 2004 to 2006 she was vice director general for Vinnova. She is also board member of the Royal Swedish Academy of Engineering Sciences since 1992 and a board member of the Royal Swedish Academy of Sciences since 1999.

Markides completed her doctorate degree at Stockholm University 1984 with the thesis Organosiloxanes containing cyano groups for capillary chromatography. Following this she started her research career at Brigham Young University in Utah, USA, first as a postdoc, and later as research assistant and associate director. In May 1990 she returned to Sweden as a professor at Uppsala University. Fourteen years later, in May 2004, she was employed as vice director general of Vinnova, the Swedish innovation agency.

Markides has been chairman of the Scientific Council for Sustainable Development under the Swedish government (vetenskapliga rådet för hållbar utveckling) since 2015. The council's mission is to give evidence-based, concrete suggestions for development of financial, ecological, cultural and social sustainability for the government's longterm sustainability vision.

== Awards and distinctions ==
Markides has received several awards and distinctions, among others:

- Norblad-Ekstrand medal (1990)
- Jubilee medal in chemistry (Storbritannien, 1992)
- Senior Individual Grant (Swedish Foundation for Strategic Research, SSF, 1997)
- International Scientist of the Year (Pittsburgh, 2004)
- H.M. The King's Medal of the 12th size in gold with Order of the Seraphim ribbon (2008)
- Oscar Carlson medal in solid silver (Swedish Chemical Society, 2010)
- The Gothenburg City Badge of Merit (2015)

== Patents ==
Professor Markides holds the following patents:

1. "Novel Liquid Crystalline Compounds and Polymers,"J.S. Bradshaw, M.L. Lee, K.E. Markides, and B.A. Jones. US Patent Number 4,864,033. Filed: November 27, 1985. Issued: February 1989.
2. "Multi-Element Selective Radio Frequency Plasma Detector for Capillary Gas Chromatography, F. Yang, P. Farnsworth, R. Skelton, K.E. Markides, and M.L. Lee. U.S. Patent Application Serial No. 24,095. Filed: March 12, 1987. Issued: January 25, 1989.
3. "Oligoethylene Oxide Substituted Siloxane Compounds and Polymers," J.S. Bradshaw, M.L. Lee, K.E. Markides, Filed: December, 1987.
4. "Chiral Polysiloxane Compounds and Polymers," J.S. Bradshaw, M.L. Lee, K.E. Markides, Filed: January, 1988. Issued: June 1990.
5. "Chromatographic Arylcarboxamide Polysiloxanes," J.S. Bradshaw, M.L. Lee, K.E. Markides, Filed: June, 1988. Issued: March 1990.
6. "Novel Chiral Copolymers with Oligosiloxane Spacers," J.S. Bradshaw, B.E. Rossiter, B.J. Tarbet, D.F. Johnson, M.L. Lee, K.E. Markides, File No. 9393 CIP. Filed: March 1992.
7. “Encapsulated Nanoparticles for Drug Delivery”, G. Jacobson, R.N. Zare, K.E. Markides, R.R. Shinde and C.H. Contag, File No. 11/748,408, Filed: May 14, 2007.
