= Buket (disambiguation) =

Buket (born 1983) is an American graffiti artist.

Buket may also refer to:

- Buket (grape), German wine grape
- Būket, an alternative name of Bukat, Iran
- Buket Atalay (born 1990), Turkish female Paralympian goalball player
- Buket Bengisu (born 1978), Turkish female singer
- Buket Uzuner (born 1955), Turkish female writer

== See also ==
- Bucket (disambiguation)
- Bouquet (disambiguation)
- Boquet (disambiguation)
- Bokeh (disambiguation)
- Boke (disambiguation)
