= Bouquet =

Bouquet, a word of French origin, pronounced [bukɛ], may refer to:

== Decorative or creative arrangements ==
- Flower bouquet, an arrangement of cut flowers
- Fruit bouquet, a fruits arrangement in the form of bouquet
- Bouquet garni, a bundle of herbs used to prepare soup, stock, and various stews
- Vegetable bouquet, a collection of vegetables in a creative arrangement
- Spiritual bouquet, a collection of prayers and spiritual actions given up for a specific purpose

== In arts, entertainment, and media ==
- Bouquet (EP), a 2015 EP by The Chainsmokers
- Bouquet (Robbie Basho album), 2015
- Bouquet (Percy Faith album), 1959
- Bouquet (Gwen Stefani album), 2024

== People ==
- Alan Coates Bouquet (1884–1976), English minister
- Anne Bouquet (born 1952), High Commissioner of the Republic in French Polynesia
- Carole Bouquet (born 1957), French actress
- Henry Bouquet (1719–1765), British army officer
- Jean-Claude Bouquet (1819–1885), French mathematician
- Jean-Louis Bouquet (1900–1978), French screenwriter
- Jules Bouquet (1888–1955), French wrestler
- Louis Bouquet (1885–1952), French artist and illustrator
- Martin Bouquet (1685–1754), French historian
- Michel Bouquet (1925–2022), French film actor
- Michel Bouquet (born 1951), French equestrian
- Nicholas Bouquet (1842–1912), German soldier who fought in the American Civil War
- Pierre-Loup Bouquet (born 1987), French ice dancer
- Sebastián Pérez Bouquet (born 2003), Mexican footballer
- Stéphane Bouquet (1967–2025), French writer
- Stephen Bouquet (1967–2022), British criminal

== Fictional characters ==
- Mireille Bouquet, one of the two protagonists in the 26-episode anime Noir
- Hyacinth Bucket, a character in Keeping Up Appearances who insists her last name is pronounced "Bouquet"

== Places ==
- Boquet, Pennsylvania, United States (Note: Spelled with only one "u")
- Bouquet, Gard, France
- Bouquet, Santa Fe, Argentina
- Bouquet Gardens, a major student residential complex of the University of Pittsburgh
- Bouquet Reservoir, a reservoir in Los Angeles County, California
- Bouquet River, a small river in upstate New York, USA
- Bouquet Canyon, California, an unincorporated area located in Los Angeles County
- Bouquet Bay, Antarctica

== Other uses ==
- Bouquet (wine), a fragrance or odor, especially when used as a description of wine
- Bouquet (magazine), a Japanese manga magazine published by Shueisha
- Bouquet sou
- Kitchen Bouquet, a browning and seasoning sauce
- Bouquet, Garcin & Schivre, a French electric car manufactured between 1899 and 1906
- Bouquet of Lilies Clock, a Fabergé egg
- Bouquet Association Table (BAT), a DVB service information (DVB-SI) table that specifies TV bouquets. Each bouquet is a collection of audio/video services.
- In mathematics, a space constructed with the wedge sum, for example, the bouquet of circles
- Bouquet, an alternative name for the card game Flower Garden

== See also ==
- Bouquet of Roses (disambiguation)
- Boquet (disambiguation)
- Buket (disambiguation)
- Bucket (disambiguation)
- Bokeh (disambiguation)
- Boke (disambiguation)
