= BQT =

BQT may be an acronym, code, or abbreviation for:

- IATA airport code for the Brest, Belarus airport
- SIL code for Bamukumbit language, a language of Cameroon
- Bouquet
