= Boak =

Boak is a family name. Notable people with the name include:

- Chet Boak (1935–1983), American baseball player
- John Boak (1837–1876), Scottish cricketer
- Keith Boak, British television director
- Robyn Boak (born 1955), former Australian sprinter
- Travis Boak (born 1988), Australian rules footballer

== See also ==
- Bill Boaks (1904–1986), British Royal Navy officer
- Willa Cather Birthplace or Rachel E. Boak House
- Boke (disambiguation)
- Combat Organization of Anarcho-Communists known as BOAK
