= Boke =

Boke may refer to:

== People ==
- Ariq Böke, grandson of Genghis Khan and claimant to the Mongol Empire
- Abba Boke, first king of the Kingdom of Gomma in the Gibe region of Ethiopia
- Uncle Boke, the uncle of author Henry Louis Gates Jr. described in Colored People

== Places ==
- Boke (woreda), a district in the Oromia Region of Ethiopia
- Boke, a district in Delbrück, Germany
- Boké, a city in Lower Guinea

== Fictional characters ==
- Boke, several characters in the works of Vladimir Nabokov
- Mr. Boke, a detective in Flight of Faviel by Robert Ernest Vernède
- Boke, a role of Howard Keel in The Small Voice
- Boke, a pet dog in Judo Boy
- Miss Ethel Boke, a character in the novel Seventeen by Booth Tarkington
- Boke Kellum, Western TV star in Dan Jenkins' Semi-Tough
- Boke-gaeru ("stupid frog"), Natsumi Hinata's epithet for Sergeant Keroro in Sgt. Frog

== Others ==
- Bökh (or Böke), a form of Mongolian wrestling
- Boke, the "simple-minded" character in a Manzai team, a form of Owarai kombi (Japanese comedy act)
- Boke no mi or Japanese quince, a flowering shrub of the genus Chaenomeles
- Bokeh (or boke), a Japanese word used in photography to describe the out-of-focus quality of a lens
- Bhoke (station code BOKE), a railway station in India
- Boke Press, the personal press of Joe Brainard and Kenward Elmslie.

== See also ==
- Democratic Centre of Boka (Democratski Centar Boke), a political party in Montenegro
- Oboke and Koboke, two valleys in Tokushima Prefecture, Japan
- "Fuyōi na Boke to Yasashisa ga Fukō o Yobu", an episode of Hayate the Combat Butler
- "Bolden Boke Boy", a song by Will Oldham
- Boak, a surname
- Bokeh (disambiguation)
- Bouquet (disambiguation)
