= Buket =

American graffiti artist

Cyrus Yazdani
- Born: Cyrus Yazdani; 1983 (age 42–43)
- Other name: Buket
- Occupation: Graffiti artist

YouTube information
- Years active: 2006–present
- Genre: Street art

Cyrus Yazdani, known by his tagger name Buket, is a graffiti artist who came to prominence after a YouTube video showed him tagging above a Los Angeles freeway in broad daylight.

== YouTube video ==
The YouTube video of him tagging over the L.A freeway has over 600,000 views and was covered by several media outlets, which eventually led to his arrest. The introduction clip of the video featured hip hop artist Evidence from Dilated Peoples who was later confused by several media sources as Buket, which is not the case. Evidence is a supporter of Buket, and is wearing a Buket T-shirt during his music video "Don't Hate".

== Growing up ==
He would eventually move to Los Angeles in 2006, where he became one of L.A's most prolific graffiti artists. He was from the graffiti crew TKO which stands for "True Kings Only". A reference to being a "king" in the graffiti underground.

== Arrest ==
In 2008, after Buket became an internet sensation, the L.A police became determined to put an end to his graffiti stardom. His apartment was raided and police issued a warrant for his arrest. He pleaded guilty to 32 felony counts of vandalism in an LA County court and served 10 months in the county jail. Months after his release he was rearrested by the Los Angeles County Sheriffs Office and accused of several new acts of vandalism. In July 2009, he pleaded no contest to one count of felony vandalism and accepted financial responsibility for five other incidents. He was later sentenced to 3 years and 8 months in a California State Prison.
