= Jules Bouquet =

French wrestler

- Born: 30 November 1888; Moulins, Allier, France
- Died: 30 October 1955 (aged 66)

Jules Bouquet (30 November 1888 – 30 October 1955) was a French wrestler. He competed at the 1920 and 1924 Summer Olympics. He also won seven national championships.
