= Bouquet of Roses =

Bouquet of Roses may refer to:

- a bouquet of roses
- Bouquet of Roses (album), an album by Les Paul and Mary Ford
- "Bouquet of Roses" (song), a single by Eddy Arnold and his Tennessee Plow Boys
- A Bouquet of Roses (painting), a painting by Pierre-Auguste Renoir
