= List of Hayate the Combat Butler episodes =

Hayate the Combat Butler anime DVD volume 1 cover

This is a list of episodes of the Japanese anime adaptation of Hayate the Combat Butler. The first season of the anime aired on TV Tokyo in Japan from April 1, 2007, through March 30, 2008, consisting of 52 episodes. The series was animated by SynergySP and directed by Keiichiro Kawaguchi. Animax Asia teamed up with Red Angel Media and dubbed the anime in English. Animax aired their English adaption between June 11 and August 21, 2009. A 25-episode second season animated by J.C.Staff and directed by Yoshiaki Iwasaki aired in Japan between April 4 and September 18, 2009, which was preceded by an original video animation (OVA) episode in March 2009. The second season was aired on Animax Asia dubbed in English from July 21 to October 13, 2010.

In 2011, Manglobe released a film and in 2012 produced a third anime series titled Hayate the Combat Butler: Can't Take My Eyes Off You which is not a direct continuation of the previous two. Rie Koshika presented the scripts for the anime and also handled the character designs. The series aired 12 episodes from October 3 through December 20, 2012, and depicted a story which was not published in the manga. The third season was dubbed in English and aired on Animax Asia from June 26 to July 11, 2013. A fourth anime series titled Hayate the Combat Butler: Cuties, again produced by Manglobe and directed by Masashi Kudo, aired 12 episodes between April 8 and July 1, 2013. The fourth season was dubbed in English and aired on Animax Asia from April 11 to April 29, 2014.

The first anime series has two opening themes and four ending themes. The first opening theme is "Hayate no Gotoku!" (ハヤテのごとく!) by Kotoko and the second opening theme is "Shichiten Hakki Shijōshugi!" by Kotoko. The ending themes are: "Proof" by Mell, "Get my way!" by Mami Kawada, "Chasse" by Kaori Utatsuki, and "Ko no Me Kaze" (木の芽風) by Iku. The second anime series has two opening themes and two ending themes. The first opening theme is "Wonder Wind" by Elisa and the second opening theme is "Daily-daily Dream" by Kotoko. The first ending theme is "Honjitsu, Mankai Watashi Iro!" by Shizuka Itō (with Eri Nakao, Sayuri Yahagi and Masumi Asano) and the second ending theme is "Karakoi: Dakara Shōjo wa Koi o Suru" by Rie Kugimiya and Ryoko Shiraishi. The opening theme of the third anime series is "Can't Take My Eyes Off You" by Eyelis, and the ending theme is "Koi no Wana" (恋の罠, Love Trap) by Haruka Yamazaki. The opening theme for the fourth anime series is "Haru Ulala♡Love yo Koi!!!" (春ULALA♡LOVEよ来い!!!) by Shizuka Itō, and there are 12 ending themes by each of the various characters' voice actors.

== Overview ==
Series	Episodes	Original run		English run	
Series	Episodes	Series premiere	Series finale	Series premiere	Series finale
Hayate the Combat Butler!	52	April 1, 2007	March 30, 2008	June 11, 2009	August 21, 2009
Hayate the Combat Butler!!	25+1	April 3, 2009	September 18, 2009	July 21, 2010	October 13, 2010
Hayate the Combat Butler: Can't Take My Eyes Off You	12	October 4, 2012	December 20, 2012	June 26, 2013	July 11, 2013
Hayate the Combat Butler: Cuties	12	April 8, 2013	July 1, 2013	April 11, 2014	April 29, 2014
—	102	—	—	—	—

== Hayate the Combat Butler! (2007–2008) ==
The anime series was released in Japan in a set of 13 DVD compilation volumes between July 25, 2007, and July 25, 2008. On June 11, 2009, Animax Asia started broadcasting the anime on their South East and South Asia channels with English dubbing done by Red Angel Media. The anime airing on Animax Asia uses the censored version of the anime and some of the characters in the English dub speak with accents. On September 28, 2009, QTV 11 started the Filipino dub of this anime; it was second in Southeast Asia. TVB Jade also started the Cantonese dub of this anime. The series was licensed in North America by Bandai Entertainment in 2008, but in February 2012, the company stopped releasing titles beyond February 7, and in April of the same year, the rights to the series were dropped, making the releases out of print. Sentai Filmworks has since licensed the series for digital and home video release.

There is some censorship that is intended as a joke as in any given instance of Hayate bleeding being censored by a sign reading "can't show this". The anime, like the manga, has references to other anime as well as some original references such as bleeping out words. This method of censoring references has followed the English translation of the manga. The DVD contains two audio tracks: one track contains the original audio and edits aired on TV Tokyo and the other track removes the bleeping and other edits. Bandai Entertainment had announced plans to retain this for their English dub, using the Japanese audio tracks in such instances. Throughout the anime, the audience can see some of the characters breaking the fourth wall. The narrator is seen talking with Hayate at times, and this makes Hayate realize that there is an audience. Most of the cast have references to their voice actor's previous roles (Nagi for example has an eyecatch where she wears the outfit of Louise's uniform in Zero no Tsukaima).

Before and after the commercial break, there is a unique eye-catcher each time. The characters who appear state a phrase which is an ongoing game of shiritori. Starting with episode six, a small segment began playing after the ending credits called the "Butler Network" featuring Hayate, Nagi, and sometimes a guest. It is meant to cover the animation production, broadcast dates, advertise character song albums and DVDs, and follow Hayate's endeavors in fighting against evil as he becomes a great butler.

No.	Title	Original release date	English airdate
1	"In English, 'Unmei' Means 'Destiny'"; Transliteration: "Unmei wa, Eigo de Iu to Desutinī" (Japanese: 運命は、英語で言うとデスティニー)	April 1, 2007	June 11, 2009
A little boy asks why Santa Claus doesn't give him presents, which the reply is that he's poor. On December 24, Hayate Ayasaki is a sixteen-year-old boy who has been working hard earning money as a bicycle delivery boy for his good-for-nothing parents. He loses his job after his employer finds out he is still in high school, and his irresponsible parents spend the money he had earned. He rushes home and finds his parents are gone. Leaving him a debt of 156,804,000 yen as a Christmas present. Soon after, the yakuza come, but he manages to break a window and escape. At Loser Park in an extremely desperate situation, Hayate tries to kidnap a wealthy young girl named Nagi Sanzenin standing by the vending machines who mistakes his action as a confession of love, but fails in his attempt. Later, Hayate saves her from other kidnappers when she yells out "HAYATE!" Nagi repays him by offering him a job as her new butler. However, overcome by injuries received during the rescue, Hayate collapses and is taken from the scene by Nagi's private helicopter. Therefore, the "Unmei" between the butler and mistress begins.
2	"Nagi Sanzenin's Mansion and a New Journey"; Transliteration: "Sanzen'in Nagi no Yashiki to, Aratanaru Tabidachi" (Japanese: 三千院ナギの屋敷と、新たなる旅立ち)	April 8, 2007	June 12, 2009
Awakening within Nagi's mansion, Hayate incorrectly concludes that he has died and gone to heaven, and resolves to make the most of it. While he is enjoying a soak in an enormous indoor bath he saw Maria the maid naked, the water re-opens his wounds and he passes out. When he regains consciousness, Nagi and Maria explain that he is Nagi's new butler now, since Himegami the former butler left. However, the mansion's head butler rejects to have him as a butler and wants Maria to fire Hayate, but Maria could not bear to fire him. Eager to demonstrate his aptitude for the job, Hayate begins cleaning the mansion at a remarkable rate, demonstrating on cleaning skills he gained from previous employments. He finds a manga that Nagi has been drawing, and when he mistakenly refers to it as a picture diary, Nagi ejects him from the room. Believing himself fired, Hayate leaves the mansion and is immediately abducted by the yakuza that are after him. All seems lost until Nagi, 'Mask the Money', appears and rescues him by paying off his debt up opening a suitcase full of money. Hayate will now work as Nagi's butler to repay her.
3	"The Beast, Robot, and Butler who Kind of but Don't Really Shout Love at the Center of the World"; Transliteration: "Sekai no Chūshin de Ai o Sakendari Sakebanakattari na Kedamono to Robo to Shitsuji" (Japanese: 世界の中心でアイを叫んだり叫ばなかったりな獣とロボと執事)	April 15, 2007	June 15, 2009
Hayate wakes up Nagi one morning to find a large white tiger sleeping with her in her bed. The tiger, Tama, nabs Hayate and carries him outside to fight. Maria realizes the two were fighting in the garden of her favorite flowers. She puts on an intimidating kind smile and guesses that Tama and Hayate were being forced to fight due to a plan made by Nagi and Klaus the head butler. Once Hayate has been treated Tama reveals himself that he can speak the human language due to being raised with so much luxury. Afterward, Klaus who is still upset about Hayate being Nagi's butler, challenges Hayate to a match with a robot, known as Eight, to see if he has the necessary skills to be a butler. Eight attacks Nagi when she insults him. Hayate uses an electrical cord from a lamp and electrocutes Eight, knowing that he will be electrocuted too. However, he is fine with it since it is his job to protect Nagi. Klaus backs off and says Hayate can remain the butler. Later, Hayate wakes up in bed, Nagi confirms his victory and the two do a formal initiation of master and butler. Maria walks in and thinks it's great that Hayate can stay at the mansion now. At the end of the episode, Hayate, who is carrying Nagi, fights a giant robot, which is the encounter at the beginning of episode 1.
4	"First Mission ~ This is Snake. No One Responds"; Transliteration: "Hajimete no Otsukai ~ Kochira Sunēku. Daremo Ōtō Shinai" (Japanese: はぢめてのおつかい〜こちらスネーク.誰も応答しない)	April 22, 2007	June 16, 2009
When Nagi goes to school, Hakuou Academy, she forgets to bring her lunch and Hayate offers to bring it to her. He also determines Nagi is a hikikomori. Once he gets to school, he is stopped at the front gates by a teacher (Yukiji) who thinks he is an intruder. Hayate eventually gets into the school, but the teacher continues her pursuit. Once inside, Hayate meets the student council president of the school, Hinagiku Katsura, for the first time, and helps her down from the tree she was climbing. As a reward, she brings him to the top of the student council clock tower so that he could see from the terrace. Yukiji, who is Hinagiku's sister and still searching for Hayate, finally finds him there and ends up fighting Hinagiku. After taking Nagi's bento box from Hayate, she jumps onto the railing of the terrace only to get blown off by a breeze. Hayate promptly rescues her, which ended her hostility to him. In the process, however, she had thrown Nagi's bento box onto the ground and spilled its contents. Although, Nagi thanked Hayate for going all the way through the campus for her.
5	"Careless Gags and Kindness Bring Misfortune"; Transliteration: "Fuyōi na Boke to Yasashisa ga Fukō o Yobu" (Japanese: 不用意なボケと優しさが不幸を呼ぶ)	April 29, 2007	June 17, 2009
Hayate wakes Nagi up and tries to get her ready to go to school, but she does not want to go and stays home instead. Maria tells Hayate that Nagi doesn't like to go outside, as, since the time she was little, she is always getting kidnapped as the only daughter of the wealthy Sanzenin family. Nagi's cousin, Sakuya Aizawa, and her butlers, Makita & Kunieda, arrive and she starts to teach Hayate to be a better comedian despite Nagi insisting that he is a butler. Sakuya tests Hayate to bring up one of his funniest jokes, though she finds it not funny, but likes his style. Maria notices they are out of tea as a visitor is expected. Hayate later goes out to pick up more tea wearing a cashmere coat but finds the journey perilous. He crosses Loser Park and meets a girl named Isumi Saginomiya. Since Isumi is lost, Hayate tries to help her, until a group of swordsmen surrounds them.
6	"You Say You Can See Time, but That is Probably Your Life Flashing By"; Transliteration: "Toki ga Mieru to Kimi wa Iu kedo, Tabun Sore wa Sōmatō" (Japanese: 時が見えると君は言うけど、たぶんそれは走馬灯)	May 6, 2007	June 18, 2009
Continuing from the last episode, Isumi gets to Nagi's mansion but Hayate leaves to pick up the tea that he was supposed to get. Hayate is ambushed by Isumi's butlers and the loan sharks from the first two episodes. Hayate eventually makes it back but comes down with a cold. Isumi is revealed to be Nagi's childhood friend, she gave a milkshake to Hayate, Nagi decided to cook a meal for Hayate, though he looked worried that Nagi might mess up the food. Back in Hayate's room, Hayate ate Nagi's meal, though he realized that she used the detergent instead of cooking oil, it was something that Nagi made especially for him. When Hayate was sleeping, Nagi was about to kiss him, until he woke up, and then Nagi got mad and hit him. The next day, after Hayate has healed, he meets a young boy and his maid who have come to Nagi's mansion. The boy, Wataru Tachibana, is Nagi's fiancé.
7	"Man's Fight"; Transliteration: "Otoko no Tatakai" (Japanese: 男の戦い)	May 13, 2007	June 19, 2009
Wataru, who is infatuated with Isumi, challenges Hayate, whom he perceives as a rival, to a duel. Hayate loses to Wataru on purpose, hoping for a romantic conclusion between Wataru and Isumi that will allow Nagi to break off her unwanted engagement. However, his overly obvious act ends up hurting Wataru's feelings. In order to reach Wataru and apologize, Hayate, together with Isumi and Nagi, must brave the Tokyo subway system. Afterward, Nagi has Hayate to deliver a bag of videos to Wataru. In the city, Hayate met Wataru's maid Saki Kijima and she leads the way to Wataru's video store, revealing that Wataru dreams of running a successful doujinshi business. As Hayate apologizes to Wataru, he wants to become a member of the video store, until Wataru finds out that he already is registered. Hayate found out that it was his father, Shun Ayasaki, who did not return the videos he rented, and then Hayate depressed that he should pay the money for the video rent.
8	"Spellbound and Hellbound, Thanks to the Kitty Ears"; Transliteration: "Neko Mimi Mōdo de Jigoku Iki" (Japanese: ネコミミ·モードで地獄行き)	May 20, 2007	June 22, 2009
Nagi gets Hayate to first try on a female school uniform, much to his displeasure and before he can do anything about it, Maria comes to Nagi's room and sees what is going on. Nagi and Maria then proceed to put Hayate in a full cat-girl outfit which entices Tama's animal instincts. Afterward, Hayate runs into Klaus and initially tries to run away, but in the end, Klaus' instincts take heed, and Maria must interfere. Later, Hayate and Maria play a game of pool where if Hayate loses, his debt will increase to 200 million yen. Maria is taking her upper hand and wants Hayate to marry Nagi. However, Hayate refused that offer, but he said that Nagi is a very kind girl. When Maria missed the shot, Hayate manages to hit the billiard to the hole, thus winning the pool game.
9	"Mr. Cow, Mr. Cow! Yes? What is it, Mr. Frog?"; Transliteration: "Eroimu Essaimu. Ushi-kun Ushi-kun! Nandai Kaeru-kun?" (Japanese: エロイムエッサイム.ウシくんウシくん!なんだいカエルくん?)	May 27, 2007	June 23, 2009
Hayate tries to motivate Nagi to go to school finally and offers to take her to and from school every day from now on. Nagi reluctantly agrees and goes to school for the day, but when she comes back it turns out she forgot her notebook at school. Hayate offers to go to school late at night to bring it back and at the school gate he runs into the school's teacher, Yukiji, he met earlier, and introduced by three girls known as the Hakuou Three Amiga: Izumi Segawa, Miki Hanabishi, and Risa Asakaze. Hayate goes into the school's old building while Hinagiku comes looking for him. Hayate saves Hinagiku from being chased by a haunted doll, and the two of them moves on to find Nagi's notebook. While Isumi and her butlers went to exorcise the real evil spirits, Hayate came back to Nagi safely with her notebook, and wonders about a school being a nice place.
10	"There's a Subtle High Deflation in the World. Play Games without Accumulation"; Transliteration: "Yo ni mo Bimyō na Haidefure. Gēmu wa Tsumazu ni Pureishiro" (Japanese: 世にも微妙なハイデフレ.ゲームは積まずにプレイしろ)	June 3, 2007	June 24, 2009
This episode, which is anime-only, takes place during the same time as episode 8 and shows some other strange things that were going on in the background. A female demon, Abe Maou, living inside an old video game is awoken and takes the Hakuou Three Amiga; Miki, Izumi, and Risa of the student council from Nagi's school inside the game where they must defeat her to return to the real world. Hinagiku, the student council president, arrives soon after and they go to destroy the demon, but she ends up ending it herself.
11	"The Value of My Life is Priceless"; Transliteration: "Boku no Inochi no Kachi wa Puraisuresu" (Japanese: 僕の命の価値はプライスレス)	June 10, 2007	June 25, 2009
Nagi, with Hayate, Maria, and Sakuya, go to visit the head of the Sanzenin family — Mikado Sanzenin. When they arrived at Mikado's castle, the butlers and maids welcomed them, though they find Hayate a suspicious-looking person, which makes him feel depressed due to his poor luck. Hayate runs into Mikado outside but initially believes him to be a landscaper on Mikado's estate. Hayate explained to him about his debt from his parents. After Mikado reveals himself, he informs Hayate that his life is infinitely worthless while he is living to merely pay off the debt he owes Nagi. Mikado gives him a special pendant (King's Stone) before leaving. Then, Nagi ran to Hayate and tells him that they should return home. A man Gilbert Kent, a fake foreigner attacks Hayate. Before the fight, Mikado explained to Nagi that when he dies someday, Nagi will be the only one with the estate. Hayate can see what will happen if Nagi doesn't want to give up her estate in the future, and he defeats Gilbert with one kick. Later, Hayate decides that he will protect Nagi from anyone that tries to hurt her, which greatly flusters Nagi.
12	"In the Past, We were Taught that Youth Does Not Look Back at the Space Police"; Transliteration: "Bokura wa Mukashi, Uchū no Keiji ni Wakasa to wa Furimukanai Koto da to Osowatta" (Japanese: 僕らは昔、宇宙の刑事に若さとは振り向かない事だと教わった)	June 17, 2007	June 26, 2009
After waking up from a dream about his childhood, Hayate talks with Maria about having dreams to live for and believes that dreams in life are very important. After revealing a childhood dream of his, Hayate gets the day off to buy his new cellphone and decides to visit his old Shiomi high school. There, he meets one of his old classmates, Ayumu Nishizawa, who has a crush on him. Hayate finds out that his parents took the rest of his tuition money, leaving him without a high school to go back to. After he begins to leave, Ayumu confesses her love for him, but he turns her down (lied that he likes 2D girls). When Hayate came back for Nagi, she adds her phone number to Hayate's new cellphone. Meanwhile, Ayumu says that she will never give up on Hayate. Later, Ayumu returned the videos to Wataru. She gets taken into the ground of Nagi's mansion under the pretense that Hayate was being held captive by yakuza. Ayumu met Nagi after an encounter with the SPs and Tama and leaves without knowing why Hayate works at the mansion.
13	"Those who Command Summer Seem to Command Exams"; Transliteration: "Natsu o Seisuru Mono wa Juken o Seisuru Rashiissu yo" (Japanese: 夏を制する者は受験を制するらしいっすよ)	June 24, 2007	June 29, 2009
After turning down Ayumu, Hayate continues to wonder what she is doing while he is at the mansion. Transfer documents arrive in the mail for Hayate to transfer into Hakuou Academy, and Hayate is overcome with joy to the point of crying. Hayate attempts to study the rest of the day for the exam the next day, however, Maria warns that he should not stress himself too much. After studying, Hayate decides to get to bed, but his sleep is continuously interrupted by Klaus and Tama. As a result, he does not get much rest. The following day, Yukiji Katsura, has a bit of fun at Hayate's expense in order to "loosen him up" before the real exam. However, due to the physical and mental exhaustion, he acquires, as a result, he fails the entrance exam by one point. Yukiji is told that she must go to the Sanzenin mansion to inform Hayate but is hesitant to do so because she believes herself to be the reason Hayate failed.
14	"Wait, Wait! I've Gotta Go To a Party. Hurry Up, Really"; Transliteration: "Chotto Chotto! Pātī Ikana Akannen. Hayoshite, Honto" (Japanese: ちょっとちょっと!パーティー行かなあかんねん.早よして、ホント)	July 1, 2007	June 30, 2009
Hayate and Nagi are excited about him being qualified for Hakuou Academy. Nagi decides to have a party to celebrate this. However, Yukiji has not told Hayate that he actually failed because she felt guilty for playing pranks on him before the test, resulting in Hayate's nervousness. Yukiji gets help from her sister, Hinagiku. After beating up her sister, Hinagiku tells Yukiji to take responsibility as an adult. The two then go to Sanzen'in's mansion to find a really big society party. Nagi and Hayate were dancing together. Yukiji struggles to tell Hayate the truth. Throughout the commotion, Hayate soon finds out and leaves the party. Maria then finds Hayate outside sitting on a bench. After a small talk, Maria presents Hayate with her student ID. Hayate finds out that Maria sent a recommendation to the academy, resulting in his admission.
15	"Samurai, Chivalry, and Moving Van Damme"; Transliteration: "Samurai, Bushidō, Ugoku Van Damu" (Japanese: サムライ、ブシドー、動くヴァンダム)	July 8, 2007	July 1, 2009
Hayate goes to school early with Nagi despite her complaints. They meet a butler, Himuro Saeki, with a student, Taiga Ookouchi, along the way who eventually runs off with Hayate's necktie which makes Hayate and Nagi fetch a new one from home. Hayate has various discussions with Nagi and discovers that she jumped a few grades and thus is a high schooler despite her age. Yukiji introduces Hayate to his classmates as he settles in. Hayate thanked not only Maria but Nagi as well. Nagi was blushing until Hinagiku interrupted her moment, and Hinagiku tells Hayate that she is heading to her clubroom. Hayate also discovers that Nagi used to be in a Kendo club with Hinagiku but quit. Hayate decides to put Nagi back into the club to free her life as a hikikomori. After they arrived at the Kendo Club, the Kendo students noticed that Hayate and Hinagiku were talking to each other while they were training and find Hayate suspicious, when he is challenged by someone in the club. Hayate accepted the challenge for Nagi's sake, while Himuro, along with Taiga, appeared in front of them.
16	"I Won't Lose Even If I Lose"; Transliteration: "Maketemo Makendō" (Japanese: 負けてもマケンドー)	July 15, 2007	July 2, 2009
Hayate is ready to fight. However, the boy, Koutarou Azumamiya, who challenged him calls his butler, Kaede Nonohara, to fight instead. The butler then punished the challenger for being a coward. Himuro informed Hayate that being a butler is a big responsibility to guide his master to the right course. Hinagiku then stops them and the battle starts. Hayate stands no chance against Kaede since he lacks a last-minute powerful move. However, he eventually wins by using Koutarou who challenged him as a shield calling it the "Art of Changing Bodies". Kaede leaves while carrying an unconscious Koutarou and hopes to fight Hayate again someday. Nagi still unwilling to go back into kendo but compliments Hayate's victory.
17	"For Your Sake, I'll Give My Best Blasting Through Everything"; Transliteration: "Anata no Tameni Meippai Nagi Taoshimasu" (Japanese: あなたのためにメイっぱいナギ倒します♡)	July 22, 2007	July 3, 2009
Nagi tries to gain experience after her work was rejected by a manga magazine. She believes she has no experience of being lazy and staying in all the time, despite being rich and thus not having any problems living. She asks Hayate who has extraordinary experiences, but then becomes angry when Hayate tells her he once won a 'Manga Newbie Award'. She continues to gain experience while attempting to clean the house (which she messes up terribly) and by trying to serve food. When Nagi starts cooking, Hayate sneaks in and tasted her food that which is the worst food ever made. Knowing that he can't let anything happened to the entire guest, he secretly makes the food so that everyone can feel satisfied with Nagi's cooking. When Nagi felt glad that they loved her food, Hinagiku talked to Hayate from behind and thanked him for making food, as she knew it was him who made that. When everyone applauds at Nagi, they all went home and Nagi tells Hayate that everyone should enjoy her manga. However, the worst was yet to come as Hayate got busted when Nagi appeared behind him and asked him why the food she made untouched was. Nagi was disappointed and sad about having no talent and starts running away. Hayate explained to her clearly that she kept making her manga's and submitting them, he also told her that there are many people who can't give up, Nagi finally cheered up and she will give her best shot.
18	"The Rare Card is Swimsuit"; Transliteration: "Rea Kādo wa Mizugi Desu" (Japanese: レアカードは水着です)	July 29, 2007	July 6, 2009
The students; Sanzenin, Azumamiya, Ookouchi, and the Hakuou Three Amiga at Hakuō Academy go to a remote island for beach class, except Hinagiku. During their jet ride, Hayate's first time being in a private jet made him airsick, until Nagi holds his hand. The butler of the beach resort named Schmidt hen Bach greets them and tries to create fun memories for the group. However, everyone is not having fun and wants to go home, so Yukiji agrees with them, but Schmidt is not willing to let them go. Schmidt summons his army of cartoon characters to stop them from leaving. Hayate, Himuro, and Taiga took the enemies down. Kaede fights, but he made Koutarou fight them instead. After the battle, everyone escaped from the island on a plane, or so they thought.
19	"Saki-san's Personal Business (National Ver.) 2007"; Transliteration: "Saki-san no Yaboyō (Zenkokuban) Nisennana" (Japanese: サキさんのヤボ用 (全国版) 2007)	August 5, 2007	July 1, 2009
Wataru notices that Saki is acting strange so he decides to ask Hayate and Maria for help while he's picking up the cursed video that Nagi rented. The person who watches the cursed video will be attacked by a giant cockroach. It seems that Wataru forgot about Saki's seijin shiki, Coming-of-Age ceremony. While Wataru is asking Nagi where he could buy a kimono for a certain person, Hayate, and Maria battle the giant cockroach. Maria screamed in fear and hugs Hayate, saying that she can't handle a black rustling creature. The narrator explained the story of Saki's grandmother, Rei Kijima, who was the legendary housemaid when Saki was little. Nagi mistakes Wataru's present to be for Isumi so she sends Isumi to Wataru's house. After Isumi left, Saki stands in front of Wataru and he shows Saki the kimono, and she responds it was thoughtful of him. Later at night, Maria is seeing Hayate and Nagi enjoying the fireworks show until a little flying cockroach landed on her, and she froze in fear for a while.
20	"I Like Books, but Sing It, Great Submarine Castle"; Transliteration: "Hon wa Suki desu ga, Utae Dairyūgūjō" (Japanese: 本は好きですが、歌え大竜宮城)	August 12, 2007	July 8, 2009
It's a hot day in the Sanzenin mansion, Hayate is searching for an Ultimate attack, and Maria suggests looking in the Sanzen'in library for hints. They find a book "Sanzenin Secret Technique" that teaches the Sanzen'in secret ultimate attack that was used by Himegami. When Nagi is reading the instructions she read a lesson about being "lovey-dovey" but hides it from Hayate. After some training, Nagi finds out that Hayate is training for Hinagiku's sake and burns the book. Depressed, Nagi leaves the house at night where she meets Ayumu who challenges Nagi in a one-on-one match for Hayate in a karaoke box; jealous when Ayumu heard Hayate is now Nagi's butler. The result of Nagi's singing says 100%, which means she won. Ayumu tells Nagi that they will meet again in their next battle. Meanwhile, Hayate and Maria are still inside the karaoke box, with Maria singing her song.
21	"Even Peter-san Has Had Enough"; Transliteration: "Pītā-san mo Ii Meiwaku" (Japanese: ピーターさんもいい迷惑)	August 19, 2007	July 9, 2009
Nagi decides to take Hayate to an amusement park in her own backyard. After they reached their destination, "Nagi Nagi Land", Hayate asked Nagi why is there an amusement park; she responded that Mikado gave it to her as a gift. However, Nagi is not tall enough for most of the rides since they have a minimum restriction of 140 centimeters. While Hayate is roaming through the haunted house, Robot Eight, who was defeated in episode 3, appears to get revenge. After Eight's plan fails, he flees, upgrades, and breaks into Nagi's mansion for another chance for revenge. In the end, Hayate and Tama defeat Eight, and Shiori Makimura of the M.H.E. Corporation comes over to fix him up. Eight started his new life, by living with Shiori nowadays.
22	"Who Came Up With the Onomatopoeia 'Kapo~n'? It's Amazing"; Transliteration: "Kapōn tte Gion wa Dare ga Kangaetandarō? Sugē yo ne" (Japanese: カポーンって擬音は誰が考えたんだろう?スゲーよね)	August 26, 2007	July 10, 2009
With summer vacation coming to an end, Nagi is saddened that there won't be any more free time to spend with Hayate. After reading a manga, Nagi decides to take Hayate fishing. As they reached the Sanzenin Lake, Nagi was ready to go fly fishing, but Hayate told her it's challenging. While Hayate and Nagi are having a romantic time fishing (in Nagi's mind) on a boat, the lord of the lake overturns their boat. Both of them saw Maria with the lord from before, in which she was able to catch it. Returning home, Hayate takes a bath and is joined by Tama who breaks the bath's water heater. Hayate becomes depressed because he believes he's always causing problems for Maria and attempts to fix the bath, only for it to be destroyed once again by Tama. But Maria tells him that she likes him as hard-working. Then he tripped and fell on Maria. Nagi saw Hayate on top of Maria and made her turned one of the fireworks into a bomb launcher and shot Hayate, sending him to the starry skies and exploded like a firework.
23	"A Genius Teacher, Who is Not a Kid, Appears"; Transliteration: "Chibikko de wa nai Tensai Sensei Kitaru" (Japanese: ちびっ子ではない天才先生来たる)	September 2, 2007	July 13, 2009
Shiori is sent to take over Yukiji Katsura's homeroom at Hakuō Academy after a number of failed projects at M.H.E. Corp. Yukiji Katsura is demoted to a sub-homeroom teacher. In order to get her old job back, Yukiji begs Hayate to help her blackmail Shiori. Hayate refuses, but Shiori runs away crying and calls Eight after Yukiji manages to get a picture of Hayate on top of Shiori after he falls down. After Shiori ran away being embarrassed, Hayate thought he can't let that happen to Nagi being ashamed, so he and Izumi start running in order to stop Yukiji from sending that picture. Then Eight appear and defends Shiori. Yukiji causes Eight to explode, sending Hayate flying. Meanwhile, Hinagiku read a report that Izumi wrote that said that she had fun with Hayate, and she got angry. Yukiji, Shiori, and Eight start celebrating after forgiving each other, but Yukiji gets stuck with the huge bill.
24	"There are No Common Troubles"; Transliteration: "Motesugite Komaru Kurō wa Shita Koto nai nā" (Japanese: モテすぎて困る苦労はしたこと無いなぁ〜)	September 9, 2007	July 14, 2009
Hayate is having a bad day because of the pendant (King's Stone) that Nagi's grandfather gave to him as he goes to return a DVD that Nagi rented. Sayuka and Isumi come to visit Nagi. Sayuka plays jokes with Hayate. Isumi then quickly realized that she lost her stole, so Hayate went to look for it. Hayate and Wataru rescue Isumi's stole from Tama in a guest room. Afterward, Wataru doesn't know how he is going to face Isumi, so Hayate will send the stole back to Isumi for him. Isumi thanks Hayate by lifting the pendant's curse. Nagi and Wataru become shocked and depressed because they misunderstand the de-cursing as an act of love because they embraced it. The next morning, Nagi wonders who Hayate loves more so she asks him and he responded that he likes (playing with) Isumi and Sakuya. Nagi loses faith in him and runs away from home to Wataru's store, and even sold Hayate to Isumi after another misunderstanding. Back at the video store, Nagi starts crying, and Saki yelled at Wataru for picking on Nagi.
25	"Shake your heart" Transliteration: "Kokoro o Yurashite" (Japanese: 心を揺らして)	September 16, 2007	July 15, 2009
At Isumi's house, Hayate felt awkwardly stunned Isumi hopes to cheer him up. At Wataru's store, Maria tells Nagi that it was foolish for her to sell Hayate to the Saginomiyas; selling him was no different than Hayate's parents did. Nagi is despondent over her conflict with Hayate, so she, Saki, and Gilbert plan a fake kidnapping in Tokyo's underground beneath Isumi's house. Meanwhile, Maria wants Hayate to reconsider and to come back to Nagi. Sakuya appeared, Nagi tells her what happened and Sakuya corrects her that Hayate 'meant' having fun playing jokes and gags. Realizing that Hayate was not at fault, which made Nagi feel guilty. It is up to Hayate to recover his butler's status. However, things turn bad when a Mecha programmed by Shiori goes crazy. Just when the mecha prepared to attack them, Hayate appears in time to save Nagi when she yells out "HAYATE!", Wataru rescues Saki as well. Hayate took out his MG3 and finally destroys Gilbert and his mecha, exploding the underground. After the battle, Nagi asks Hayate if he can be her butler, so he accepts the job again. Isumi is happy with that and she knows that both Hayate and Nagi will get along really well.
26	"'It Took 29 Minutes to Deliver, So Please Pay What Was Asked For'... Is an Old Myth Now"; Transliteration: "Otodoke made Ni Jū Kyū Fun deshita no de, Kitei Dōri no Ryōkin de Oshiharai Onegai Shimasu... wa, Tōi Zenseiki no Hanashi" (Japanese: お届けまで29分でしたので、規定通りの料金でお支払いお願いします......は、遠い前世紀の話)	September 23, 2007	July 16, 2009
Hayate is running an errand for Nagi and meets Ayumu in the park as he blasts away Gilbert's assault. Still embarrassed about their last encounter, Hayate pretends he has amnesia and is unable to get out of the mess after Ayumu claims he is her butler. Nagi claims Hayate back and gets him to reenact experiences he faced in Nagi's mansion to recover his memory (even though he didn't lose them). They tried various means, from dressing him in the cat-girl outfit from episode 8, and pitting him against Tama. Then Klaus pushes Hayate off a plane into the lake, Nagi and Ayumu set foot onto an island that turns out to be a giant turtle. Hayate wards off the turtle, hearing Hayate say their names made Nagi and Ayumu believe Hayate 'recovered' his memories. Ayumu realizes how important Nagi is to Hayate.
27	"Hayate Rises Upon the Earth"; Transliteration: "Hayate Daichi ni Tatsu" (Japanese: ハヤテ大地に立つ)	September 30, 2007	July 17, 2009
The superintendent of Hakuou Academy, Kirika Kuzuha, decides to hold a Butler Battle Tournament to see who the strongest butler of all Hakuou is. Hinagiku is outraged when she asked Kirika about the "butler battle tournament" flyer she sent. Kirika questioned Hayate about the butler's strength meaningless, in which she finds the answer wrong. At first, Hayate is reluctant to enter the tournament, but Nagi convinces him to do so so she can see him win. Later that evening, Maria tells Hayate that he should not enter the tournament; however, Hayate has made his decision that he will enter the tournament, for Nagi's sake, so the next day, the tournament will begin in the Hakuou's dome. In the meantime, Hinagiku becomes a temporary butler so that she can enter the tournament to interfere with the superintendent's plans. Hinagiku defeats Kaede against his Ultimate Move.
28	"Black Hayate"; Transliteration: "Kuroi Hayate" (Japanese: 黒いハヤテ)	October 7, 2007	July 20, 2009
Hayate irrelevantly defeats Klaus and Tama by catching Klaus' ribbon when falling off during Klaus' Ultimate Move, leaving the whole public under the impression that he has the power to defeat opponents without even touching them. After numerous retirements from Hayate's opponents and battles through the tournament, the match between Hayate and Himuro begins but Himuro just left the ring to help Taiga and hopes to fight Hayate another time. Hayate defeats Hinagiku in the finals and fights Kirika's butler Shion Kuresato. After defeating Shion by discovering her weak point, Hayate wins the tournament, despite all the students in awkward silence. Nagi kept a trophy for the Butler Battle Tournament. The Superintendent vows to bring Hayate to her by calling out her Dark Butlers League.
29	"Marriage Meeting"; Transliteration: "Miai" (Japanese: 見合)	October 14, 2007	July 21, 2009
Saki's mother asks her to have a marriage meeting. Earlier that day at the video store, Saki came back to Wataru to inform him of her marriage meeting after a party with her friends, but he didn't care. Wataru becomes worried and asks Nagi what to do. Sakuya, Nagi, and Wataru decide to go on a marriage meeting tour into the woods to spy on Saki. The man Saki is to meet turns out to be Kyonosuke Kaoru the gym teacher from Hakuou Academy, but they both reveal that they both have someone else they like. Hayate mistranslates what they're saying with his lip-reading technique. After a misunderstanding, Hayate and Wataru decide to crash the meeting by sending Tama to kidnap Kyonosuke and to lose to Wataru on purpose. The plan is set back and Yukiji kidnaps Kyonsuke instead. When Saki asked Wataru that was he worried about her, he admits it and she took his hand so that they can go home since Saki is not ready to get married. In the meantime, Kirika sends Duel Butler to bring Hayate into the Dark Butlers League and they have a Yu-Gi-Oh! Battle.
30	"The Pretty Lady Detective Saw it! The Hot Spring Female Teacher Murder Case"; Transliteration: "Bijin Ojōsama Meitantei wa Mita! Yukemuri Onna Kyōshi Satsujin Jiken" (Japanese: 美人お嬢さま名探偵は見た! 湯けむり女教師殺人事件)	October 21, 2007	July 22, 2009
Yukiji is found murdered at a hot spring inn and Detective Nagi decides to take it upon herself to solve the mystery. After a number of wrong assumptions, Nagi blames the Voice of the Heavens ("Ten no Koe", i.e. the narrator). Of course, the whole murdered case was just a story that Nagi acted up until Yukiji couldn't stand it anymore, so she used her last resort, and it's called "fanservice". Nagi and the rest of the girls enjoy the hot springs, Hayate is stuck in the men's barrel bath with Eight. Kirika sends another butler to defeat Hayate, and they have a B-Daman battle.
31	"Do You Like the Rich, Pretty Ladies?"; Transliteration: "Okane Mochi de Kirei na Onee-san wa Suki desu ka?" (Japanese: お金持ちでキレイなお姉さんは好きですか?)	October 28, 2007	July 23, 2009
Sakuya visits Nagi. Nagi becomes offended when Sakuya tells her she's a brat because she has no siblings and claims she can be a better sister than Sakuya. Nagi orders Hayate to find kids that are lost on her property so she can prove it to Sakuya. Hayate comes back with Itsuki and Shunji, and Nagi plays with them while her SP looks for their parents. Sakuya interfered as she tells Nagi that they should go outside, so the kids liked that idea and hugged Sakuya. Sakuya suspects the kids to be thieves and catches them in the act. As Nagi worries about the children, Sakuya tells Hayate that if Nagi hears the truth about the two thieves, she'll get hurt. Itsuki and Shunji were about to escape with a briefcase until they were caught by the robots. Sakuya ordered her butlers to destroy the robots; Hayate destroys them and saved the two. As they were going to give the briefcase back to Sakuya, she decides they can keep the briefcase as their souvenir. Afterward, Kirika sends the third mysterious butler, Mini Yon, and he challenges Hayate to a Mini 4WD race.
32	"Welcome to Demon Hunter, Isumi, and Nabeshin"; Transliteration: "Mamono Hantā Yōkoso Isumi, to Nabeshin" (Japanese: 魔物ハンターようこそ伊澄、とナベシン)	November 4, 2007	July 24, 2009
Outside the mansion, Hayate has a brief encounter with an unidentified person with an afro, Nabeshin. Isumi is planning to come to Nagi's house but she ends up getting lost again. Fortunately for her, Sakuya finds her, but along the way, they find a man with the head of a carp who begs for their help. The carp man asks Isumi to phantom bust phantoms who are tampering with his lake. Sakuya asked the carp man about that phantom, and he responded that he was served on a plate alive. Isumi blows the phantom away by using her talismans and destroyed the viruses. Sakuya wants Isumi to tell Nagi what happened in the past, but Isumi can't do that, because she remembered when Nagi was afraid of the dark when she was little, Isumi felt bad for Nagi and decides not to scare her friends anymore.
33	"Why?! School Festival – Part One"; Transliteration: "Naze da?! Gakuin Bunkasai Zenpen" (Japanese: なぜだ?!学院文化祭·前編)	November 11, 2007	July 27, 2009
It's Hakuou Academy's culture festival time and Hayate is kept busy by the students and teachers. Then the Hakuou Three Amiga persuades Hayate to work at a cosplay café. Nagi searches for him, but she is unable to find him. The cosplay cafe turns out to be the butler cafe and the trio made Hayate work again as they are playing cards. As Hayate and the trio switch places for work, Yukiji appeared out of nowhere and dragged Hayate out of the cafe. Nagi starts crying because of Hayate, as she wanted to go walking with him really badly. Hayate was surrounded by the crowd with their paperwork, as Yukiji made him work for her. Hinagiku helps relieve Hayate from frustration. A mysterious dark butler, Puppet Butler, tricks Nagi and hypnotizes her. In her hypnotic state, she finds Hayate and leads him to Puppet Butler at the school's old building where he challenges Hayate and Hinagiku. Even after the battle, Nagi is still under hypnosis the moment after she said that she hates cultural festivals. Nagi then said to them that she will teach them the "true culture" of Japan, by selling all her manga along with Superintendent Kirika.
34	"Why Did It Die?! School Festival – Part Two"; Transliteration: "Naze Shin da?! Gakuin Bunkasai Kōhen" (Japanese: なぜ死んだ?!学院文化祭·後編)	November 18, 2007	July 28, 2009
Nagi, still in her hypnotic state, helps organize the second day of the school festival with the help of Superintendent Kirika. They organize their own Comiket where Nagi sells her own dōjinshi. Then Shion couldn't take it anymore and wants Hayate to take Nagi back. Kirika challenges Hinagiku to see if Nagi's dōjinshi or Hayate's butler cafe can make the most money. If Hayate wins, Kirika must return Nagi back to him. Kirika then gives them her only warning, because if Hayate loses to Nagi, the student council members must run a maid cafe in their embarrassing outfits, so Hinagiku accepts her terms. During the Hakuou culture festival report, the reporter interviewed Hayate as he answered her questions about how did he make a cake that's so delicious. Hinagiku started working part-time, Koutarou and Kaede volunteer too. Kirika just made her backup plan by giving out prizes with the manga. Hinagiku noticed Nagi and opened the door. When Nagi comes and tastes the Christmas cake that Hayate made for the competition, her hypnotic state goes away and he hugs her. They win the competition against Kirika at the last minute, thanks to Nagi's big payment to the butler's cafe for 2000 members of the SPs. Later that night, Nagi makes Hayate cosplay as punishment for making her worried.
35	"Must See! 2007 Autumn Complete Guide Book for the Latest Trendy Date Spots for Teenagers"; Transliteration: "Hikken! Nau na Yangu no Tame no Saishin Oshare Dēto Supotto Kanzen Gaido 2007 Aki" (Japanese: 必見!ナウなヤングのための最新オシャレデートスポット完全ガイド2007秋)	November 25, 2007	July 29, 2009
Nagi is having trouble writing a new manga, so she orders Hayate to go out and gather references for her. She also gives Maria and Klaus the day off because she feels she needs to be alone to concentrate. Maria tags along with Hayate and the two soon become uncomfortable because their joint effort to gather references feels like a date. In the city, Hayate and Maria saw many couples, he starts taking pictures of Nagi's references. Yukiji, Risa, Miki, and Izumi disguise as afro photographers spot them and try to get the two to kiss by bringing them to the trendiest date spots. Finally, Maria and Hayate put up an act as though they are breaking up persuading Yukiji and the trio to leave them alone, then the two took a ride on a Ferris wheel. At the end of the day, Nagi gives Hayate her fiery wrath when he showed her the photo references he took, which are mostly pictures of him and Maria having fun together.
36	"Klaus is Japanese Because it's Written as 倉臼"; Transliteration: "Kurausu wa Kurausu to Kaite Nihonjin" (Japanese: クラウスは倉臼と書いて日本人)	December 2, 2007	July 30, 2009
Klaus is feeling depressed after Nagi gives him permission to retire after he tells her about a dream he had, where he retired on a coffee plantation in Brazil. At the school thinking about retirement, Klaus is confronted by Himuro, with Taiga, about being a master's shadow. After Maria tries to convince Klaus to stay, Klaus decides to challenge Hayate to a "serve-the-lady" match to see who is the better butler. Klaus fails at this and has his mindset on retiring. Maria comes up with a plan that involves Hayate's female alter ego, Hermione. This plan fails as well and just before Klaus is about to leave, Nagi thinks of a way to make Klaus stay. Her plan succeeds and Klaus decides to stay as a Sanzen'in butler. The next day, Klaus is ironing the newspapers for Nagi, while Hayate and Maria were glad Klaus recovered.
37	"I Want to Return to Being a Normal Girl, But Please Buy My Character Song ♥"; Transliteration: "Futsū no Onna no Ko ni Modoritai, demo Kyarason wa Katte ne ♥" (Japanese: 普通の女の子に戻りたい、でもキャラソンは買ってね♥)	December 9, 2007	July 31, 2009
Nagi asks Hayate what type of girl he likes, after reading a romance magazine that states that Nagi's zodiac sign, Sagittarius, will face a crisis in terms of romance. Hayate tells her that he likes girls that are normal and makes a passing remark that Nagi "wouldn't understand". Nagi runs off in a rage, determined to learn how to be 'normal'. Nagi meets Ayumu and comes to the conclusion that tagging along with her will help her learn how to be 'normal'. After a day of following (and bothering) Ayumu, she invites Nagi to stay at her place. Ayumu gives Hayate a call, at Nagi's request, to inform him that Nagi will be staying over. It turns out that Hayate has been following them. Just as Hayate was about to leave, Isumi shouts in distress, trapped at the top of a nearby tower. Wataru rushes to save her before Hayate while Saki rushes to save a clumsily climbing Wataru. When Isumi falls along with Wataru, Hayate catches both of them. However, Saki, Sakuya, and Makita & Kunieda also fall out of nowhere on top of a dizzy Hayate.
38	"Hayate in Danger! Complete Shutdown!!"; Transliteration: "Ayaushi Hayate! Kinō Kanzen Teishi!!" (Japanese: 危うしハヤテ!機能完全停止!!)	December 16, 2007	August 3, 2009
It's Christmas Eve as Nagi, Hayate, and Maria go to a Christmas party hosted by Nagi's grandfather—Mikado. Just like the previous Christmas party, Nagi escapes – this time with Hayate. They head to Loser Park where Nagi tries to make romantic advances on Hayate, but they are interrupted by a mysterious dark butler, Cyborg Butler, and Superintendent Kirika. Hayate is knocked unconscious, but they are saved by Himegami Akane, who now calls himself Princess God. In Hayate's dream, his parents appear and they don't believe he is a butler. He woke up the next morning, and Nagi and Maria were desperately waiting for him to wake up. Himegami was on a chair while Klaus argues with him about his banishment as a Sanzenin butler. Throughout the day, Hayate fails at all his butler chores. Maria and Nagi are worried and want Hayate to take a day off. As Hayate felt disappointed in what has happened to himself, Himegami explains it is because Kirika drained all his butler powers. He threw a dōjinshi that was from the culture festival, in front of him, which Hayate realizes Himegami been watching over Nagi. In order to keep Nagi safe, Hayate resigns as Nagi's butler and leaves the mansion.
39	"Friends of the Well-Behaved, Praise the Debt-Ridden Butler!"; Transliteration: "Yoi Ko no Tomodachi Shakkin Shitsuji Banzai!" (Japanese: よいこの友達 借金執事万才!)	December 23, 2007	August 4, 2009
Nagi feels that it is all because of her that Hayate quit his job, while Maria tries to comfort her and wonders where did Hayate go. Meanwhile, in Hakuou's dome, Kirika asks Hayate to wear the ancient butler robe which has been rejecting countless butlers. In exchange, she promises to leave Nagi and her fortune alone. Hinagiku found out about Hayate, she calls Nagi that Hayate was getting blackmailed over the Sanzenin estate. Nagi, Hinagiku, Himegami, and the SPs come to Hayate's rescue, but they arrive too late, as Hayate has turned into a nekomimi maid. They battle Kirika and Shion who're under the curse of the white snake and during the battle, Nagi's pleas reach Hayate. The nekomimi maid uniform transforms into the legendary butler uniform. With his newfound power (Ultimate Move), Hayate defeats Kirika's white snake, Jörmungandr. When the dome starts to collapse, Hayate, Nagi, Hinagiku, and Himegami managed to get out of there, to their safety. Himegami gets a hold of the legendary butler uniform and then disappeared. Kirika and Shion somehow survived and still flirt with each other. Realizing that it's still Christmas, Nagi made a stop at Loser Park, Hayate and Nagi wished themselves a Merry Christmas the place where they first met each other.
40	"New Year's Food is Also Good, but Enjoy Hayate, Too"; Transliteration: "Osechi mo Ii kedo Hayate mo ne" (Japanese: おせちもいいけどハヤテもね)	January 6, 2008	August 5, 2009
On the night before New Year's, Nagi orders Hayate to bring her to Kujukuri Beach to have a romantic date watching the sunrise after reading about it in a manga. Hayate is forced to take her on a bike since he doesn't have a permit to drive. While on their road to the beach, Nagi uses her credit card to buy a carriage for them. Meanwhile, their road continues as Hayate takes Nagi to go all the way to the beach, full speed ahead. But then, they encountered an enemy in his automated car, and they were challenged to a highway race. Hayate used a secret technique to survive from the curve. Hayate and Nagi have arrived at Kujukuri Beach on time to see the sunrise for New Year's Day, but Nagi falls asleep just before the sunrise. While Hayate went to buy two warm coffee cans, he forgot his wallet, until Maria reached to him. Hayate put his coat on Nagi and the sun has risen. The next day, the mansion's circuit breaker overloads and Hayate goes to the annex to turn it back on. On the way there, he gets stuck in a blizzard which is really caused by Sakuya's snowblower. Hayate looked at the map that shows a hot spring that is inside a power plant. Sakuya dragged him into the hot springs and holds him. Fortunately, he managed to turn the power back on but passes out due to the extreme cold. Sakuya and Makita & Kunieda rescue Hayate, then abandon him after he makes a bad pun.
41	"Goodbye Teacher, Despair ~ Graduation Special"; Transliteration: "Sensei Sayonara Zetsubō ~ Sotsugyō Supesharu" (Japanese: 先生さよなら絶望〜卒業スペシャル)	January 13, 2008	August 6, 2009
On the way to the school, Hayate and Nagi bump into Hinagiku, who is worried about her sister after she gave her New Year's allowance. Yukiji appears, shocking the three with an unusually cheerful attitude, giving Hinagiku a New Year's allowance because of a promise Yukiji made with her 10 years ago (although it was only 500 yen), and shocking them even more after they found a letter of resignation which dropped from Yukiji's bag. After Hayate and Nagi rushed to the Hakuou Three Amiga, he tells them that Yukiji is quitting her job as their teacher, and find that hard to believe, but Yukiji replied to them as a "yes". Hinagiku's heart is broken and remembered how Yukiji used to treat her well. When homeroom ends, the class begs Yukiji to stay as a teacher causing Shiori to burst out in tears, who is happy that the class cares for her and decides to not resign. The resignation letter actually belonged to Shiori who found being Yukiji's superior harder than she thought. Yukiji was happy because she found many signs of good fortune. Hinagiku gives Yukiji a piggyback ride to her room after beating her up. Elsewhere, Maria rents movies from Wataru's video store. Then saw Ayumu putting a New Year's card for Hayate in a mailbox but then bumps into some thugs. Maria and the SPs defend Ayumu and she gives her some marshmallows that Saki gave her earlier. Back in the Sanzenin mansion, Hayate, Nagi, and Maria talked about their usual day.
42	"It's like the Dog, the Mouse, and the Bulldog"; Transliteration: "Sore wa Inu to Nezumi to Burudoggu no Yō ni" (Japanese: それは犬と鼠とブルドッグのように)	January 20, 2008	August 7, 2009
A flashback shows how Hayate's parents predicted his fate to become a strong boy who will run away from debt collectors. In the Sanzenin Mansion, Klaus just brought an expensive portrait, but Hayate points out it to be a fake, which Klaus disagrees, until a judge appears and claims the portrait is indeed a fake, leaving Klaus shocked. Hayate explains to Nagi and Maria, that his father was once an art dealer, who would use Hayate to switch a picture for a fake to package for a customer when he was little, because of that he could tell the difference. Nagi, perplexed by Hayate's apparent lack of weaknesses, plots ways to find chinks in his armor. Maria, Sakuya, and Isumi get swept up in the flow and discuss their weaknesses as well. Hayate and Wataru begin studying German in preparation for a Hakuou mathematics exam. Nagi decides to teach Wataru. While Maria helps Hayate she tells him a bit of background info on Isumi, Sakuya, and Wataru. During a flashback, Wataru felt sad that he can't enter the Hakuou Academy, since there were only three seats available for students who skip grades. But when Sakuya arrived in front of Wataru, she gave him her enrollment documents. Back in Hayate's room, they go to check on Nagi and Wataru. Wataru explains that he only loves Isumi, in which Isumi suddenly heard him. Wataru then covered his confession by telling Isumi that it was a joke, which provokes Sakuya to hit him with a paper fan for being hopeless. Nagi becomes jealous that Hayate and Maria were alone together, so she chases him while he runs away. Prompting Maria to remark that Hayate's weakness is "not understanding a female's heart".
43	"Poseidon Advance Generator Gavas"; Transliteration: "Poseidon Adobansu Jenereitā Gabasu" (Japanese: ポセイドンアドバンス ジェネレイターガバス)	January 27, 2008	August 10, 2009
While working on her manga, Nagi gets the idea that, instead of chasing after Hayate to further their relationship, she must give him the cold shoulder and force him to chase her. A convenient invitation from Sakuya to a cruise on a familiar-looking ship (Titanic) gives her the perfect opportunity to set this plan into motion. As Hayate wanders around amazed, she shuns him over and over, culminating in the command to "explore the ship yourself". The ship is then threatened by a trio of terrorists, who are handily defeated by the Sanzen'in and Aizawa butlers; however, one of them sets off a bomb, blowing a hole in a cargo hold Hayate had just wandered into. There, he meets Isumi, who had become lost, in danger from a pair of large sharks. As the ship-goers are evacuating, Nagi remarks that Hayate hasn't shown up yet, and goes to search for him. She finds him holding off a shark; as she dives into the water to help, she is attacked by the other shark. Hayate defeats the sharks to save Nagi but falls unconscious from the combination of the cold water and wounds he received from the earlier explosion. He is saved by Klaus, but Klaus's attitude causes Nagi to worry, as it has the effect she was trying to achieve herself.
44	"Mystery Behind the 120% Acceptance Rate (Temp.)"; Transliteration: "Shūshokuritsu 120 Pāsento no Nazo (Kari)" (Japanese: 就職率120パーセントの謎(仮))	February 3, 2008	August 11, 2009
This episode begins with an opening sequence of "Millenium Legend: Magical Destroy". Nagi completed an improved version of her manga, but still, no one can understand it except for Isumi. Hayate showed the girls his manga "Flower Magical Girl, Britney", but they somehow felt unimpressed. Nagi takes Hayate, Maria, Isumi, and Sakuya out for ramen, but they find themselves in a hidden animation studio where they are shocked to hear that Nagi's manga is going to be animated. Then, Izumi, Miki, and Risa arrived at the studio as well. The directors declare Nagi's demands to be impossible, but they end up animating it anyway because of a rumor that their stock will go up if they do it. After the premiere one week later, everyone is at a loss for words.
45	"It's ♥ Maria-san Thank You Day in February!"; Transliteration: "Nigatsu no Maria-san Kansha Dē! Desu wa ♥" (Japanese: 二月のマリアさん感謝デー! ですわ♥)	February 10, 2008	August 12, 2009
Nagi and Hayate believe that Maria has gotten upset when they thought she looks older than her actual age, so they thought about telling Maria to take a break. Wataru said to them that Maria is not the kind of person who would take even one break. But, Saki just made a plan for Hayate and Nagi to give Maria a day off. They surprise Maria with an overnight relaxation tour at the Hyatt Regency hotel. When Hayate orders for room service, they meet Izumi and find out the students of Hakuō Academy are running the hotel for a one-day experience event. Maria enjoys a few of the hotel facilities until the students are unable to accomplish their jobs and ask Maria for help, especially when Kirika and Shion visit. Maria spends the rest of the day helping the students in secret from Nagi and Hayate. The next day, back at the mansion, as both Hayate and Nagi were going to thank Maria, she said to them that she is the one to thank "them" because all that matters to her is the smiles from everyone, including them.
46	"His Name is Magic Ball Pitcher Wataru!!!"; Transliteration: "Yatsu no Na wa Makyū Tōshu Wataru!!!" (Japanese: 奴の名は魔球投手ワタル!!!)	February 17, 2008	August 13, 2009
Wataru is shocked one day when he sees that Isumi is wearing a different school's uniform and can even get from one point to another without getting lost. Wataru seeks help from Nagi, but she thinks that the question is incomprehensive. Eventually going to the high school he saw Isumi go to earlier. Hayate and Saki hid themselves watching Wataru standing at the bus stop to Shiomi high school, and Hayate heard that name before because it is his former school. Saki and Hayate helped Wataru how to get on campus, simply by getting through the ripped fence. Then, Ayumu met Wataru and opened the ripped gate so that he can get in. Wataru finds Isumi showing a lot of attention towards the pitcher on the baseball team, which leaves him to jump to conclusions. It turns out Isumi was merely trying to exorcise the spirit of a girl who had liked the pitcher. Ayumu tells Hayate the story about how her school is cursed by the spirit of the dead manager. Wataru challenges the pitcher to a match for Isumi's heart but loses which greatly depresses him. Isumi succeeds in exorcising the spirit, and thanks Wataru for his help, which relieves Wataru of his worries about Isumi.
47	"Sure, Amuro Had a Place To Return To, But..."; Transliteration: "Sorya Amuro ni wa Kaereru Basho ga Atta Deshō Kedo..." (Japanese: そりゃ安室には帰れる場所があったでしょうけど...)	February 24, 2008	August 14, 2009
Due to Hayate's most recent borderline test scores, Nagi gives him some time off to study. Meanwhile, Klaus sends a robotic butler built by Shiori, which looks somewhat like Hayate to fill in for him while he is studying. The robot, known as Thirteen, does an even better job as a butler than Hayate even could, which depresses him when he finds out. Hayate then tries not to get too worried when Sakuya tells him that Nagi and Thirteen get along well. As Nagi realized how jealous Hayate is, she is somehow enjoying his jealousy over her. Thirteen scanned Nagi's emotion, he asked her why is she happy, and as she explained to him about 'jealousy', even he doesn't know the meaning. Thirteen devises a plan to get Hayate and Nagi alone together, though only Hayate realizes this after the fact. Nagi grabbed his hand and said to Hayate that he is her only butler, no matter how incapable he is to her. That night, the news reporter informed that a giant asteroid is closing in on Earth, Thirteen goes into space to destroy the meteor, thus saving the Earth and Nagi's happiness, but is stranded on the moon.
48	"Hina ♥ Love"; Transliteration: "Hina ♥ Rabu" (Japanese: ヒナ♥ラブ)	March 2, 2008	August 17, 2009
Hinagiku's birthday is coming up, and her mother asked her if she would spend it with someone she liked, which makes her become anxious around Hayate the following morning. Both Hayate and Hinagiku find unsigned "love" letters addressed to them at school, and they both think that each other might have sent the letter. They later meet at the appointed place in front of the kendo dojo but find out that it was Koutarou who sent the letters in order to show Hinagiku that he could defeat Hayate. Hinagiku then leaves, mad at Hayate for saying that she wouldn't do anything girly and lying that he didn't expect the person who wrote the letter to be Hinagiku. He challenges him to a game of cat's cradle, though loses terribly. Back in Hinagiku's house, she somehow can't concentrate on her studies. Hayate and Hinagiku later spend the next day together after running into each other in town, she accepts Hayate's apology for yesterday and accidentally says that she expected the person who wrote her letter to be Hayate which causes her to run away in embarrassment. At a park, Hinagiku noticed a cat trapped above a tree, she falls off the tree trying to save it then yells "HAYATE!", she, along with the cat, is saved by Hayate. As Hinagiku thanked Hayate, he gives her the stuffed rabbit she wanted.
49	"Normal Talk"; Transliteration: "Futsū no Hanashi" (Japanese: 普通の話)	March 9, 2008	August 18, 2009
Izumi, Miki, and Risa invite Hayate and Nagi to their "You-To-Be" (a parody of YouTube) Motion Picture Research school club where they film and gather funny movies and laugh at them. Nagi shows interest in the club and Hayate believes it's an opportunity to get Nagi to break her hikikomori habits. They are shown example videos which happen to be Hayate's embarrassing moments with voice overs. Hayate snaps and destroys the club's equipment and media just before Superintendent Kirika appears for her annual club investigation. It turns out the club is on the verge of being shut down and the trio was planning to use the video of Hayate as a means of keeping the club alive. As a backup plan, they promise Kirika new footage of Hayate jumping off the clock tower. With the club saved and Hayate and Nagi as new members, the club decides to hold a normal story competition. Risa tells the first story and soon the mic is passed around to even non-club members.
50	"Quiz! Written as "Rival" but Read as "Friend"!!"; Transliteration: "Kuizu! Shukuteki to Kaite Tomo to Yomu!!" (Japanese: クイズ!宿敵と書いて友と読む!!)	March 16, 2008	August 19, 2009
Hayate wakes up Nagi then showed her a newspaper headline of a girls-only quiz tournament in pairs. Lucky for Hayate he finds Ayumu who also wants to compete. Nagi and Ayumu compete together in the "4256th High School Girls Ultra Quiz", though is each looking forward to the possibility of winning different prizes; Nagi wants the trophy for its resemblance to Hayate, and Ayumu wants the all-you-can-eat "shabu-shabu" ticket to a restaurant so she can go out with Hayate. The tournament is hosted by the narrator himself (Voice of the Heavens), and Abe Maou, the demon from episode 10, as a co-host. During the tournament, Nagi and Ayumu have trouble cooperating, though manage to end up winning the tournament in the end. Ayumu uses the all-you-can-eat ticket to invite Nagi and Hayate to go out and eat together.
51	"Spring"; Transliteration: "Haru" (Japanese: 春)	March 23, 2008	August 20, 2009
Nagi is planning a celebration party for Hayate for graduating, though gets to stay out of the mansion for a while by giving him the task of retrieving a small box carrying an item she bought off the Internet. While out, Hayate is offered 150 million yen by national escort service in order to recruit him into their business and so that he can pay off his debt to Nagi. While thinking this offer over, he loses the box and has to go halfway around the world in order to retrieve it, though by the time he gets back to the mansion it's already dark out. A light flashes and Hayate saw the "Arc de Triumph", only with the banners congratulating him for his passing grade. Everyone has been expecting Hayate to show up, and the item he retrieved which was intended for him, and turned out to be a small rich pocket watch. Hayate is very grateful to Nagi for the party when she tells him that money is not just what keeps them together but wants to be with him for an eternity, and he hugs her in tears of joy. Hayate later turns down the offer from the escort service, and it turns out that Mikado set up the offer in order to test Hayate's loyalty and is still worthy of owning the pendant (King's Stone). The next day, Hayate and Nagi go on a bicycle ride, both happy with each other having been a year since they met.
52	"Radical Dreamers"	March 30, 2008	August 21, 2009
During Golden Week, Hayate, Nagi, and Maria take a trip to Mykonos in the Aegean Sea. Hayate asks Nagi to come outside, but she denied him instantly, though she gives in to Hayate after he sulks. Elsewhere, Ayumu, Hinagiku, and the Hakuou Three Amiga are on a tour at Cappadocia, Turkey. The next day, Ayumu and Hinagiku went to Athens in Parthenon, Greece. Meanwhile back at Mykonos, Nagi remembered that day when she met a certain boy who never kept her promise. Nagi's hat is blown away by the wind, and when Hayate goes to retrieve it, he falls into a time-slip and arrives 8 years back and finds a little Nagi back when she was living on the island. After he grasps what is going on, he discovers she is being targeted by the Sicilian Mafia, and he ends up protecting her from them, ultimately winning; Hayate realizes that the reason he was sent back was to save Nagi. Hayate had promised Nagi in the past to go stargazing together at the beach, but when they go at sunset Nagi's hat once again is blown away and Hayate goes through another time-slip back to the present. This caused Nagi to remember Hayate in the past as a liar who disappeared on her. Back in the present, Wataru and Saki are looking at the stars through a projector. Also, everyone else on a boat that leads to Mykonos is stargazing as well. Hayate gives Nagi back her hat and the two gazes at the starry night sky together.

== Hayate the Combat Butler!! (2009) ==
No.	Title	Original release date	English airdate
OVA	"Hayate the Combat Butler!! OVA (Hayate's Interests!)"; Transliteration: "Hayate no Gotoku!! OVA (Atsu ga natsui ze Mizugi-han!)" (Japanese: ハヤテのごとく!! OVA (アツがナツいぜ 水着編!))	March 6, 2009 (DVD release)	July 21, 2010
The entire recurring cast is invited to the private beach inside the Sanzenin estate. Just as Nagi is about to join in the fun, she starts to feel shy (embarrassed to show Hayate her swimsuit), and Hayate tries his hardest to convince her about the beauty of the beach. After some time, some of the girls spy around for Hayate. Everyone goes to play volleyball, Maria asks Hayate to check on Nagi again believing she has given up and wants to join. He accidentally sees Aika Kasumi, the vice president of Hakuou, and Hinagiku changing. As Nagi is ready to go into the open water, she finds out that Hayate is being spied on by other women. When she runs out into the harbor, an evil spirit enters her body and flies out into the sky. The evil spirit starts stripping those of their swimsuits. After Hayate rescues Nagi, they find themselves stranded on an island. Isumi exorcises the evil spirit. On the island, Nagi tries to give Hayate CPR, but he wakes up and embarrasses her. At sunset, they wonder what's going to happen to them since they're stranded until they find Maria and everyone else there. Hayate realizes just how big the Sanzenin estate is.
1	"The Forbidden Freestyle Marathon!"; Transliteration: "Kindan no Marason Jiyūgata!" (Japanese: 禁断のマラソン自由形!)	April 3, 2009	July 21, 2010
A marathon meeting on the 1st of February is coming up at Hakuou Academy, and Maria and Hayate want Nagi to participate too. Nagi makes a bet with Klaus, where if she can get in first place in one of the races, then that would prove Hayate's worth as a butler, but if she cannot, then Hayate will be fired. Hinagiku mentions the cash prize for winning the event is 150 million yen, which her older sister Yukiji burst in. Hayate trains with Nagi the next two days, and the day of the race the two get off on a slow start. Saki comments on the race which embarrass Wataru. Before long, Hayate must carry Nagi throughout most of the race and faces a few enemies along the way impeding their progress. After leading Hinagiku onto a suspended bridge, due to fear of heights, Nagi goes on ahead, but just as she is about to win, Yukiji beats her to the goal at the last minute (despite leaving Kyonosuke behind), winning the 150 million yen prize which surprises everyone.
2	"Money's Tiger"; Transliteration: "Manē no Tora" (Japanese: マネーのとら)	April 10, 2009	July 28, 2010
Nagi glooms for losing the race on one measly step. As stipulated, Hayate is to be fired as Nagi's butler, but as Klaus fears getting fired himself for this since Nagi desperately wants Hayate to stay; and Maria felt humiliated by the heroic act that Klaus set up for her and Saki earlier. Klaus sends Hayate off to be trained at the Tiger's Den for Butlers to show his worth. Hayate meets a Catholic sister on the train, Sister Fortesia, and he later meets her again at a church which doubles as the location of the Tiger's Den. Ayumu reminds Nagi about Hayate's horrible luck with women, so she calls Hayate to relieve herself until the nun confiscates his cellphone. The next day, Hayate must find three others to go on a Butler Quest in an underground dungeon as a part of his training. He first asks Hinagiku (now calling him by his surname) but holds back due to her frightening presence. Nagi is quick to join; Yukiji (who didn't get to keep the prize because of debt) and Wataru also join in.
3	"There is No Legend After All"; Transliteration: "Soshite Densetsu ni Naranai" (Japanese: そして伝説にならない)	April 17, 2009	July 28, 2010
Hayate and his party members continue to go on the butler quest. They soon discover the dungeon is haunted by evil spirits and traps. Hayate is temporarily intoxicated by a poisonous spear after saving Nagi's life. Meanwhile, Hinagiku and Isumi are on the quest to help Hayate and exorcise these evil spirits, respectively. Hayate's group encounters the now-dead, ghost priest of the church, Linn Regiostar, who points out Sister Fortesia to be a fake and that she is really Sonia Shaflnarz who comes from the Sicilian Mafia. Sonia takes control of a plug-in giant size M.H.E. robot to enact her revenge against the Sanzenin family. She explains that her father got fired and later died when he failed to assassinate Nagi Sanzenin years ago on Mykonos because a butler (Hayate) interfered; which happened in Season 1 Episode 52. While Sonia and Hinagiku are fighting, Yukiji is possessed by an evil spirit and attacks the others, also using the giant robot. Linn urges Hayate to exude more power and destroy the robot, while Isumi exorcises the spirit possessing Yukiji. The church demolishes and Sonia becomes fond of Wataru. Back at the mansion, Klaus reinstates Hayate as a butler for saving Nagi, and he collapses from all the energy he used from the butler quest.
4	"You're Just Like Me"; Transliteration: "Kimi wa Boku ni Niteiru" (Japanese: 君は僕に似ている)	April 24, 2009	August 4, 2010
The day before Valentine's Day, Nagi tries to make chocolate for Hayate and skips school. At Hakuou, getting permission from Hinagiku, Ayumu tries to give Hayate "love chocolate" to show her feelings but instead gives him obligation chocolate. Hinagiku notice Ayumu panicked and tells Hayate to exchange it. However, after receiving the "love chocolate", Hayate is a bit confused on the love concept and asks Maria for help. Maria remembers that she has had no experience with love either and becomes dejected. However, she decides to make some chocolate for Hayate. Nagi, after failing herself to make chocolate, tells Hayate to make some chocolate for her. Maria makes her chocolate look outrageous, but when asked about who it is for, she becomes embarrassed and runs outside. Hayate catches up to her and gives her some chocolate that he made, and says Valentine's is the time where people work harder just to see the person they treasure smile. Ayumu thanks Hinagiku for helping her; leading Hinagiku to think that Ayumu and Hayate are a couple now.
5	"Heart to Heart"	May 1, 2009	August 4, 2010
A story of Kazuki Nishizawa, Ayumu's younger brother, is told how he met Nagi and fallen in love with her. Maria explains how Nagi developed an inferiority complex due to her short height causing her to frown most of the time. Nagi walks alone to Wataru's store and rudely remarks that he is short too, Kazuki follows her. Kazuki confesses to Nagi about his love for her and asks if he is able to take Nagi on a train ride, though it becomes a date. In the end, Kazuki says that they should do things like this again. Nagi says that it is impossible because she already likes someone, but Kazuki says he has not given up; Hayate kept watch on them the whole day. Back at the mansion, Nagi becomes dejected because Hayate has not become jealous about her date with Kazuki. Later, Nagi takes a bath, with Maria helping her wash her hair. Maria leaves for a bath towel, but due to a sudden visitor, she asks Hayate to bring a towel to Nagi. Hayate walks into the bathroom and accidentally sees Nagi naked. Hayate asks if Nagi is mad at him, and she says she is, but she says she forgot why she was mad and kisses Hayate on the cheek.
6	"Your Place"; Transliteration: "Omaenchi" (Japanese: おまえンち)	May 8, 2009	August 11, 2010
Nagi is feeling totally embarrassed after kissing Hayate on the cheek, and she sends him out of the mansion. Maria gives Hayate one million yen to go live outside the mansion for three days, but he uses the money to help people in need. Broke and having nowhere to go, Hayate is in Loser Park reflecting on his position, when Hinagiku invites him to her house. Mrs. Katsura lets Hayate stay for the night, and Hinagiku comes into Hayate's room. Hayate becomes flustered when he sees Hinagiku and notices her beauty. Hinagiku as well becomes flustered when she wants to ask Hayate about his relationship with Ayumu. The next day, as Hayate comes to school wearing a school uniform, Hinagiku whispers to him not to tell anyone that he's staying at her house, though Miki seems to suspect the situation. The people that Hayate helped come to the mansion and give all the money back. Maria notices that Hayate gave away his living expenses and decides to find out where he is staying. She infiltrates the school to do so; wearing a school uniform and seems to be attractive, and meets Hayate on the elevator for the school clock tower.
7	"Half-Baked Jealousy"; Transliteration: "Yakimochi to ka Yakaretate Japan" (Japanese: やきもちとか焼かれたてジャぱん)	May 15, 2009	August 11, 2010
Hayate and Maria get stuck inside the school's clock tower elevator, where Hayate realizes Maria is disguising herself. Nagi calls Maria on her cellphone due to her clumsiness with making tea, and Maria goes back to the mansion (forgot to ask Hayate where he's staying). Hinagiku and Hayate go to the supermarket and talk with each other, and also make dinner at her house. They accidentally touch each other's hands. Hinagiku asks Hayate about "his girlfriend" Ayumu, but he corrects her that he doesn't have a girlfriend, and realized she brought a single guy in her house alone. Hinagiku goes to a mini-market and meets Ayumu, who is eating baked yams. Hinagiku talks to Ayumu about what happened during Valentine's Day, and if she has a relationship with Hayate. Hinagiku found a little kitten and decides to take it back home. Hinagiku feeds the kitten milk, but Hayate says they cannot sleep because they need to take care of the kitten. Ayumu reveals about Hayate's parents to Hinagiku. Maria asks if Nagi wants Hayate to come back to the mansion the next day, and she says she does.
8	"Shiranui is Here"; Transliteration: "Shiranui ga Yattekita" (Japanese: シラヌイがやってきた)	May 22, 2009	August 18, 2010
Mrs.Katsura recommends Hayate that he should return the favor of letting him stay for the night by giving Hinagiku a birthday gift on March 3. Hayate goes back to the mansion with the kitten since Hinagiku can't keep it because her mother is allergic to cats, and Nagi instantly decides that she will raise it, naming it Shiranui. Tama becomes jealous of Shiranui and tries to make it seem as if Shiranui has torn up Nagi's manga, but the plan backfires when Shiranui rips the manga himself and has the blame placed on Tama. Nagi locks Tama in a cage for a little while as punishment. Isumi comes over to play with the kitten, but Shiranui finds her disagreeable, which depresses Isumi. Isumi asks Sakuya for help, who suggests a change in attire since she always wears traditional clothes. After changing into more casual clothing, Isumi again visits Nagi with Sakuya. Hayate helps Isumi by spraying diluted catnip on her clothing. Nagi and Isumi play with Shiranui, and Nagi lets Tama play as well.
9	"What a Girl's Heart Yearns For..."; Transliteration: "Otomegokoro ga Motomeru Mono wa..." (Japanese: 乙女心が求めるものは......)	May 29, 2009	August 18, 2010
Sonia (the nun) goes to Wataru's video store to see if the feelings she felt for him before were genuine, and she finds she is truly in love with him. She becomes jealous of Saki, but when she is kidnapped by the same pair that tried to kidnap Nagi at the beginning of the story, Sonia says she will save Saki if Wataru gives her a kiss. Wataru kisses her on the cheek, and Sonia saves Saki easily. Later, Saki becomes jealous of Sonia who will be coming back many times to borrow a series of DVDs. Shiori asks Yukiji if she ever thought of finding herself a boyfriend since she is already twenty-eight, though since she has no experience with love, she goes around asking others for advice. Yukiji urges Nagi to throw a big society party so she can meet a potential boyfriend, and Klaus plans one that night. Yukiji went to Kyonosuke's place but kicks her out when she annoyed him. Later, Nagi convinces Yukiji that she never really wanted a boyfriend, and Yukiji agrees, saying alcohol is all she needs. Yukiji gets drunk at the society party, and Maria wonders about being involved in a relationship herself.
10	"Where's the Present?"; Transliteration: "Purezento no Yukue" (Japanese: プレゼントの行方)	June 5, 2009	August 25, 2010
Hayate asks Maria what she would like to get an idea of what girls his age want so that he can figure out what to buy Hinagiku for her birthday. Hayate goes into town and chances upon Ayumu, though they are initially awkward toward each other after remembering the events of Valentine's Day. Izumi, Miki, and Risa show up as well, and they help Hayate look for a present. Hinagiku finds them and finds out about Hayate looking for a present for her. Hayate says he does not have the financial means to support a girlfriend at this time, so while he does not dislike Ayumu, he cannot bring himself to get involved in a relationship after explaining the ex-girlfriend he had back in kindergarten 10 years ago. Back at the mansion, Hayate asks Maria when her birthday is, but Maria evades the question, causing Hayate to think he said something tactless. He apologizes to her and finds out Maria was abandoned by her parents, never knowing her birthday or her real name, though her birthday is set on December 24, the day she was found. Athena Tennousu makes a cameo appearance.
11	"Here Comes the Hinamatsuri"; Transliteration: "Hinamatsuri no Koro ni" (Japanese: ヒナ祭りの頃に)	June 12, 2009	August 25, 2010
Hinagiku becomes preoccupied with why she has been thinking about Hayate so much lately, especially the romantic dream she had about him. She finds out that Hayate is on the verge of failing to progress into the next grade, causing her to get very angry at him. Hayate goes to apologize, but he does not know what to say. Then Hinagiku question Hayate about his parents, but he doesn't believe there was a reason. When Sakuya breaks a cursed doll of Isumi's, a cross-dressing curse befalls Hayate, causing him to wear a maid uniform against his will, quite a shock to Nagi and Maria. Isumi says if he does not beat the owner of the highest place, Hinagiku, in a match before midnight tonight, he will have the desire to cross-dress for the rest of his life. Meanwhile, Hinagiku is in a hypothesis though, Linn advises her to be honest with her heart and she concludes it is revenge instead of love. Isumi gives a note to Hinagiku to explain what she should do, but Hinagiku takes this as a note of challenge and does not intend to lose. Tonight at Hakuou Hinamatsuri festival, Hayate arrives to secretly meet up with Hinagiku, but Izumi chases him and runs into a guy who becomes infatuated with him.
12	"Cruel Big Foolish Guy's Thesis"; Transliteration: "Zankoku na Ōbaka Yarō no Tēze" (Japanese: 残酷な大馬鹿野郎のテーゼ)	June 19, 2009	September 1, 2010
After Izumi's butler, Kotetsu, realizes that Hayate is a boy, he becomes enraged, and tries to hunt down Hayate. Later, Nagi gives Hinagiku the watch she prepared for her birthday and then becomes kidnapped by Kotetsu, who says to have Hayate rescue her. Meanwhile, everyone surprises Hinagiku with a surprise birthday party and asks her to sing "A Cruel Angel's Thesis". After being asked where Hayate's present is, Hinagiku misunderstands the letter of a challenge as a way for them to be alone. After hearing that Nagi has been kidnapped, Hayate runs through the festival even though he is wearing embarrassing clothes; his female alter ego, Hermione. Nagi talks with Kotetsu about how shallow his love is, and how he only looks at the appearance of others. This opens Kotetsu's eyes and he confesses his love again to Hayate but is beaten away by Nagi. Nagi also scares away the curse of the Hina Doll and Hayate returns to normal. Finally, Nagi and Hayate head home, but Hayate remembers that he forgot to meet up with Hinagiku, and heads to the clock tower where Hinagiku is sleeping.
13	"Feeling of Freedom"	June 26, 2009	September 1, 2010
Hayate remembers the meeting at the clock tower with Hinagiku and finally arrives. Hinagiku wakes to see Hayate, and after noticing the time, becomes enraged at Hayate's tardiness. She begins to attack Hayate with the "Masamune Bokken" she received from Isumi, and after a while, Hinagiku loses control of her emotions due to the sword and cries in Hayate's chest. Later, Hinagiku becomes embarrassed due to losing control of her emotions, and when she asks Hayate for her present, Hayate gives her some cookies he baked. Hinagiku then proceeds with telling Hayate about how her past family also left her and her sister behind with a debt of 80 million yen and how she can relate to Hayate. Hayate leads Hinagiku to the terrace and makes her look at the view which they saw the first time they met to make her feel better. After seeing the beautiful sight of the city at night, Hinagiku finally realizes that she is in love with Hayate. Just that she was too afraid to admit it in case he might disappear like her biological parents. The next day, Hinagiku greets Hayate (i.e. by his first name), and Nagi reflects that Hinagiku might have fallen in love with Hayate, but he doubts it. Hinagiku happily says to her parents in her mind that she found someone she likes.
14	"The Saginomiya Resident's Relatives"; Transliteration: "Saginomiya-ke no Ichizoku" (Japanese: 鷺ノ宮家の一族)	July 3, 2009	September 8, 2010
Nagi wakes up after her dream where she became the number three spot in the Hayate the Combat Butler character rankings and Hinagiku became the top spot. On that night, Sakuya and Isumi are battling an evil eye yōkai, however, they fail to catch its remainder. The next day, Maria gives a bag to Hayate to deliver to Isumi because she is not feeling well. Hayate meets Isumi's mother, Hatsuho, and grandmother at the Saginomiya mansion. Afterward, Isumi is attacked by the giant evil eye yōkai and Hayate saves Isumi. After leaving the Saginomiya mansion, Hayate walks with Maria when a small person wearing a mask all does something unpleasant to Maria while attacking Hayate. Their battle ends abruptly to reveal the person as Ginka Saginomiya, Isumi's great-grandmother. Isumi arbitrates them for now. Ginka reverts to her old self again and sucks Hayate's blood to gain back her youth. Hayate comes back home to the mansion, in a state of anemia.
15	"What Happens at Shimoda Onsen"; Transliteration: "Shinoda Onsen Yukemuri Ryojō" (Japanese: 下田温泉湯けむり旅情)	July 10, 2009	September 8, 2010
Nagi decides to take Hayate and Maria on a trip in Shimoda to visit a mysterious meteorite that seems to enhance growth, along with other special powers. On the way there, Nagi accidentally leaves the train to buy a box lunch, but then the train leaves without her, and she becomes lost all alone. Nagi meets up with Ayumu after eating at a Russian ramen shop and Ayumu lets her ride on the back of her bike to take her to the next train stop. Meanwhile, Hinagiku tries to talk to Maria for advice about love, but they are interrupted by a call from Nagi. While waiting on hold, Nagi and Ayumu meet some masked killers who say they are out to assassinate Nagi but do not know which one is her due to both of them having pigtails. Ayumu pedals away fast on her bike on the highway, and Hayate is on the same road, looking for them.
16	"Stardust Memory"; Transliteration: "Sutādasuto Memorī" (Japanese: スターダストメモリー)	July 17, 2009	September 15, 2010
Ayumu and Nagi manage to get away from the killers, but Nagi jumps off the bike soon after, telling Ayumu that she will be fine since Hayate is coming. She became upset when Ayumu asked if she had a mother. At an onsen, Hatsuho says Hayate resembles Nagi's mother. Hayate finds Ayumu's cellphone and is promptly attacked by Ginka, who wants to take him to the Shimoda onsen as well. Ayumu comes back to Nagi to share a soft drink when the masked killers return, and Ayumu and Nagi jump on the bike again to escape. Hayate and Ginka arrive after they compromised, and Ginka takes care of the masked killers, allowing the others to meet up at the train station in Atami. Nagi tells Hayate to bike Ayumu the rest of the way, and Hinagiku looks after Nagi and Maria on the train. Once in Shimoda, Nagi meets with Sakuya and the two go to a secret hot spring which causes Nagi to act like she is intoxicated, though it does not adversely affect Sakuya or Hayate who comes to retrieve Nagi, much to her embarrassment. Later, an alien comes crashing into Nagi's room at night.
17	"Under the Cherry Blossoms"; Transliteration: "Sakura no Shita de" (Japanese: 桜の下で)	July 24, 2009	September 15, 2010
Nagi decides to help the alien, Maya, to find its misplaced spaceship. In the onsen, Hinagiku prepares herself to tell Ayumu the truth about her feelings for Hayate but passes out from heat stroke instead. Nagi and Maya find the spaceship at the Saginomiya's place, where Hayate had agreed to meet Ginka so that he could give blood to Isumi to restore her powers. However, Isumi declines, despite which Ginka violently attacks Hayate. Kotetsu appears and tries to seduce him that he seriously dislikes, Nagi finds them and has a fight with Hayate. Nagi runs away and boards Maya's spaceship and suddenly the spaceship lifts off into outer space. Isumi regains her powers and sends Hayate and Maya to outer space. Nagi cries believing she won't see Hayate again, the moment she cried out for him, "HAYATE!" he appears and saved her. They found out Yukiji set off the spaceship and knock her out. Maya then sends Hayate and Nagi home. Hayate encounters Nagi's mother, Yukariko Sanzenin, in a dream and finds out that the reason Nagi comes to Shimoda every year is to remember the anniversary of her mother's death. Nagi introduces Hayate to her mother.
18	"Those Who Never Give Up, Even on White Day"; Transliteration: "Howaito Dē no Korinai Hitobito" (Japanese: ホワイトデーの懲りない人々)	July 31, 2009	September 22, 2010
Ayumu realizes that despite telling him otherwise, she actually does want a White Day present from Hayate. Hayate buys a basket of cookies for Ayumu at Hinagiku's suggestion, but, nervous about presenting the gift to Ayumu, practices a greeting for Ayumu only to accidentally give the cookies to Maria instead. When Hinagiku discovers that Hayate neither gave the gift to Ayumu nor has enough money to buy another one, she brings Hayate to a friend's café in order to bake cookies. Hokuto Kaga who runs the Café Donguri teases that Hayate is Hinagiku's boyfriend. Despite Hayate's terrible luck, he manages to meet Ayumu and give her his White Day gift. That night, Hayate catches up to Hinagiku and gives her a present as well.
19	"Aim for the King!"; Transliteration: "Ōja o Nerae!" (Japanese: 王者をねらえ！)	August 7, 2009	September 22, 2010
Nagi, having woken up afternoon for all of spring break, resolves to rid herself of her hikikomori lifestyle. After Hayate accidentally breaks his cellphone, Hayate and Nagi go shopping in Shinjuku to replace it. Nagi gets lost, although she vehemently denies it, and is directed to the lost child section of the electronics store. Nagi challenges the boys there to a duel with the Hayate the Combat Butler Trading Card Game; she wins and tells the boys to call her "leader", after which Hayate arrives to pick her up. On March 29, Sakuya reminds Hayate that her birthday is on April 3. Knowing that Hayate cannot afford to buy her a present, she asks for a good laugh. In an attempt to learn how to be funny, Hayate forces himself to try to jab at Maria but instead trips and face-plants her chest. Nagi beats up Hayate as a result, and Sakuya gets the laugh that she asked for, although she tells Hayate that she still expects something on her actual birthday.
20	"I Couldn't Do the Maid Spin"; Transliteration: "Meido Tān ga Dekinakute" (Japanese: メイドターンができなくて)	August 14, 2009	September 29, 2010
Father Linn Regioster suddenly appears before Hayate and announces his decision to rest in peace. However, he claims that to finally leave the Earth, he must rid himself of his one lingering regret by flirting with a maid. Since Maria cannot see Linn and because Hayate has no intention of letting Linn take over his body, Isumi resolves to learn how to be like a maid herself. After Nagi coaxes some advice out of Wataru under dubious circumstances, Sakuya introduces her new maid Haru to teach Isumi the spirit of a maid. Much to both Hayate and Isumi's chagrin, however, the entire setup was an April Fools' Day joke by Linn. Later, Haru is revealed to be Chiharu Harukaze the secretary of Hakuou Academy who doesn't want her secret expose to the others.
21	"Somehow Our Own Cat is the Very Cutest"; Transliteration: "Nandakanda de Jibunchi no Neko ga Ichiban Kawaii" (Japanese: なんだかんだで自分ちの猫が一番かわいい)	August 21, 2009	September 29, 2010
Nagi tells Hayate the story of how she came to adopt Tama during a trip in Africa, with her friend Jenny. Tama, determined to get rid of Hayate and Shiranui, corners the latter in a delivery truck only to be locked in and transported to an unknown location. Fearing for his life after hearing that an anaconda loose in the city was shot and killed; Tama tries to make his way home with Shiranui. Shiranui snatches a cellphone from Izumi so Tama can pinpoint the mansion's location. The two are saved by Hayate when he pulls them out of the way of a speeding truck. Hayate manages to bring Tama (and Shiranui) home by fooling the town folks that he's a man in a suit.
22	"Keep On Dreaming"	August 28, 2009	October 6, 2010
Nagi asks Maria about the importance of money by which she understands how hard Hayate works to pay his debt off. She decides to give Hayate a birthday present, a wristwatch, bought with money earned from part-time work much to Hayate and Maria's surprise. Hayate and Nagi are given work at Café Donguri (where Hayate made cookies on White Day); which Hokuto accepts, to find Ayumu also working to make up for the money spent on the trip to Shimoda. Nagi and Ayumu rekindle their rivalry over Hayate as they serve a number of customers, including a troubled manga artist, Gouji Ashibashi, and a poorly disguised Maria. He absurdly proposes to Maria, Hayate saved her by convincing the manga artist that Maria is a man.
23	"Our Destination"; Transliteration: "Bokutachi no Yukue" (Japanese: 僕たちの行方)	September 4, 2009	October 6, 2010
Tired after a day's work, Nagi decides to take a nap even though Sakuya's birthday party is that same evening. At the party, Aika Kasumi discovers that Chiharu works as Sakuya's maid. Meanwhile, Sakuya forces an extremely reluctant Wataru to entertain her and her guests; he performed tamely yet Sakuya comforts him and he trips on top of her in time for Isumi to see them. When Hayate and Nagi arrived, Sakuya manages to get Hayate to perform as well. The audiences thought Hayate's performance was great, except for Sakuya, Nagi, and Maria. Sakuya introduces her father and younger twin siblings to Hayate. After seeing Sakuya play with her troublesome siblings and her humorous father, Nagi wanders off. At Café Donguri, Hinagiku asks Ayumu to see the cherry blossoms with her, saying that she needs to talk with Ayumu about something important.
24	"Distance"	September 11, 2009	October 13, 2010
While talking to Sakuya, Hayate remembers his past fallout with his first girlfriend (Athena) a long time ago. Ayumu takes Hinagiku to a Ferris wheel which overlooks a grove of cherry blossoms. At the Aizawa mansion, Nagi goes missing and Hayate and the others try to figure out where she is. Hinagiku finally tells Ayumu that she betrayed her and that she too is in love with Hayate ever since the time she was with him at the Hakuou clock tower during her birthday. However, Ayumu is perfectly fine with it and tells Hinagiku that it means it's a friendly competition to see who can win over Hayate's heart. While searching for Nagi, Sakuya talks to Hayate about his parents, revealing his older brother. Meanwhile, Hayate finally finds Nagi alone gazing at the stars since it reminded her of Yukariko. He tries to cheer her up but fails at it; however, she is comforted by his effort and tells him not to leave her side. Everyone in the episode then gazes towards the sky where fireworks are being displayed courtesy of Sakuya's birthday.
25	"Because It's All About the Butler and His Mistress"; Transliteration: "Shitsuji to Ojō-sama no Hanashi desu kara" (Japanese: 執事とお嬢様の話ですから)	September 18, 2009	October 13, 2010
Nagi is forced to rest after coming down with a fever after a day of hard work. Hayate said they're alone in the mansion! Nagi asks Hayate to do something that makes her sleepy, upon which Hayate tells a strange and nonsensical version of Alice in Wonderland. Bored, unable, and unwilling to fall asleep even when Maria is back, Nagi asks Hayate to get her some Packy and attaches a hidden camera to his tie for entertainment. Nagi and Maria watch as Hayate's terrible luck forces him to undergo a string of unfortunate events. He realized he forgets his wallet and has to work in Sakuya's maid café for 1 hour to gain money. Thanks to his infinite bad luck, everyone suddenly gets the urge to eat Packy, and his incredible luck with girls, other girls started feeding him with Packy too. Hayate ultimately makes some Packy himself and then when walking home a truck appeared out of nowhere and crashed Hayate. Nagi runs outs with tears and found out despite his endless bad luck, Hayate still had some good luck in him as a ball acted as a bumper and saved him from certain death. He apologizes for breaking the camera on his necktie (he knew it from the start) and brings back one stick homemade Packy. No matter how unlucky Hayate is Nagi wants him by her side and kisses him on the cheek. A new semester starts at Hakuō Academy though Nagi is still unwilling to attend. Fumi Hibino and Athena make a scene at the end. And so the story goes on...

== Hayate the Combat Butler: Can't Take My Eyes Off You (2012) ==
No.	Title	Original release date	English airdate
1	"The First Night"; Transliteration: "Daiichi Ya" (Japanese: 第一夜)	October 4, 2012	June 26, 2013
On September 18, a new semester is about to begin, but Nagi is lazing around as usual. Hayate and Maria try to cheer her up in vain until she gets interested in a TV show about aliens featuring the Area 51 in Nevada, and wishes to go there to investigate. An opportunity arrives when she receives a call from the Las Vegas police department asking her to retrieve some of her late father's belongings who died in a car accident 13 years ago, but Maria states that she is forbidden to go there until Silver Week and Nagi flees from the mansion in anger just to find later that she had forgotten her cellphone and wallet and is unable to get back home until she is found by Hayate when having a spicy drink. Hayate then turns his attention to a small child who approaches him, long enough for Nagi to be kidnapped by some bandits behind his back. Hayate gets on the girl's bike to pursue the kidnappers and rescues Nagi from them. Just when Hayate and Nagi return home, the girl appears before them once more, introducing herself as Ruri Tsugumi and claiming herself to be Nagi's little sister. Ruka Suirenji the idol makes a live performance.
2	"The Second Night"; Transliteration: "Daini Ya" (Japanese: 第二夜)	October 11, 2012	June 27, 2013
Despite her shocking revelation, Ruri is ignored by Hayate and the others until she is finally brought before Nagi who hears from her that she is actually her sister while not having any proof of it. Nagi accepts to let her stay for a while, but after questioning what her agenda is after seeing her snooping around the mansion, she decides to take her to live at the "Violet Mansion" with the other tenants; Chiharu, Ayumu, and Kayura Tsurugino. Ruri refuses to stay until Nagi is convinced to give her a chance. Nagi asks Ruri if she has any sort of special skill and she reveals herself as a master of systema, strong enough to confront Hayate. Hayate is attacked mercilessly by her until he decides to fight back and she starts crying, which is later revealed as just a trick for him to open his guard. Nagi reprimands Ruri for using such underhanded tactics but compliments her for her fighting skill, even asking to learn it from her.
3	"The Third Night"; Transliteration: "Daisan Ya" (Japanese: 第三夜)	October 18, 2012	June 28, 2013
Hinagiku decides to adopt a more cheerful and forgiving attitude as she believes her ever strict demeanor prevents her from getting close to Hayate. Her sister and her classmates Miki, Izumi, and Risa wonder about her sudden change in behavior and wondering if her anger would eventually build-up to the point of snapping, they ask Hayate to invite her for a date so he can take the fall in their place. Unaware of their intentions, Hinagiku accepts the butler's invitation and goes to a children's movie with Ruri tagging along, and the crowd of kids in the theater tease on Hayate and Hinagiku's relationship as they watch the movie; however, the film broke. Hayate won't give up cheering up Hinagiku, so the two have a joyful day together at an amusement park. On their way home Hinagiku asks Hayate the reason for inviting her and he tells her the truth. Hinagiku says something to him, but Hayate does not hear it because of a train passing nearby.
4	"The Fourth Night"; Transliteration: "Daiyon Ya" (Japanese: 第四夜)	October 25, 2012	July 1, 2013
Ruri is looking for a way to get closer to Nagi in her search for some unknown item at her mansion. However, Hayate tells her Nagi has no interest in dealing with people, but she is worried. Chiharu and Kayura recommend Ruri to buy some games for her to play with Nagi just to find later that she had already bought and played them. After Nagi, Chiharu and Kayura have a heated discussion about their preferences related to manga, anime, and games in the Akihabara district, Ruri asks them for some recommendations and they set for Wataru Tachibana's shop. While the trio argues about which manga Ruri should start reading first, she ends up wandering into the R-18 section just to flee in horror soon after. In the end, she ends up purchasing just a dōjinshi, "30 Days of Soul Burning", from an unknown author which Hayate recognizes as one of Nagi's original creations.
5	"The Fifth Night"; Transliteration: "Daigo Ya" (Japanese: 第五夜)	November 1, 2012	July 2, 2013
Angry at Maria for always scolding her, Nagi orders Hayate to follow her around looking for some reason for her to scold the maid herself. Unable to find any bad trait about the maid, the butler stumbles on Yukiji who invites him for lunch just to learn that she has no money and intends to have him pay the bill. Meanwhile, Maria calls Mikado and asks why there are no pictures or any info about Nagi's father, and he responds that all evidence of his existence was erased by him, as according to him, he was just a con artist who married Yukariko aiming for the Sanzenin fortune. As Hayate argues with Yukiji, both Ruri and Sonia appear and start ordering food, increasing the bill. As the four argue about who will pay the bill, a thief breaks into the restaurant, giving an opening for both Sonia and Ruri to flee. The thief claims that he is stealing money for the sake of his sick little sister's medical expenses and Yukiji reprimands him while pointing his own gun at him and Hayate. Hinagiku appears mistaking her sister for the thief and stops her. With the thief turning himself to the police and Hinagiku leaving with her sister, Hayate remains alone at the restaurant, calling Maria to ask her for help with the expenses. At the end of the episode, Hayate chases Sonia to pay the bill.
6	"The Sixth Night"; Transliteration: "Dairoku Ya" (Japanese: 第六夜)	November 8, 2012	July 3, 2013
Silver Week has arrived, but Nagi now has no interest to depart for Las Vegas and retrieve her late father's possessions, rather spend the day with Hayate instead. Later she pays a visit to the Violet Mansion, just to find that Ruri is alone. Nagi receives a message from Chiharu and Kayura saying that they will arrive in Las Vegas to see Ruka's concert. Unable to leave when it starts raining, Nagi manages to have Ruri confess that her true intention is to obtain the elusive "Black Camellia", a treasure believed to be in possession of the Sanzenin family and Nagi asks her grandfather by phone about it. However, Mikado refuses to say anything beyond the fact that the treasure was stolen 13 years ago and she breaks her smartphone in anger. When the rain worsens into a storm, the two girls struggle to keep the house by themselves when Ruri saves Nagi from being hit by a large tree branch carried by the wind. When the storm passes, Hayate appears at the mansion and he gets a call from Mikado who reveals to Nagi that the Black Camellia was stolen by her father.
7	"The Seventh Night"; Transliteration: "Dainana Ya" (Japanese: 第七夜)	November 15, 2012	July 4, 2013
A story about Nagi's father, Shin Hayek, is told how he was a thief hoping to gain something worth living, then he met Yukariko; became her butler, and eventually fallen in love with her. Nagi discovers the Black Camellia is in Las Vegas with Shin's belongings. Nagi and Mikado explain that the Black Camellia is a clock that brings bad luck but can grant the owner miracles for eternity on the strike of "8" with both hands. At a festival, Ruri who is desperate to get the clock, pairs with Nagi to enter a quiz contest hosted by Fumi Hibino to win tickets to New York via to go to Las Vegas. Isumi senses an ominous presence from Ruri. In the end, Hinagiku and Ayumu won the tickets and want to see Ruka's concert in Las Vegas. Ruri ran away wondering what to do next, since Nagi warned her not to do anything dangerous, implying that she is a concerned about her safety. Hayate comes looking for Ruri into the woods where he, Isumi, and Sakuya witness her being abducted by a bird-guy. In the middle of the episode, Ruka tells the story of a nymph that granted her King's wish for eternal life.
8	"The Eighth Night"; Transliteration: "Daihachi Ya" (Japanese: 第八夜)	November 22, 2012	July 5, 2013
Hayate, Isumi, and Hinagiku (using the "Shirosakura" sword) manage to save Ruri from the bird-guy, but she refuses to tell them who he was then leaving. The next morning, at the mansion they receive a fraudulent ransom note for Ruri's return to Las Vegas; nonetheless, recognize the handwriting to be Ruri's. Wondering if she really was kidnapped or not, Nagi finally takes the motive to go to Las Vegas and retrieve the Black Camellia. Testing the misfortune clock, Maria grabs it then suddenly the ventilation went up under her skirt in an eerie timing, and so Hayate took possession of the clock for now. While killing time in Las Vegas, Hayate got lost and his smartphone battery unfortunately died. He unexpectedly meets Ayumu saying their plane had a mechanical problem, thinking the Black Camellia caused it. Maria and Nagi find Hayate from their viewpoint seeing as if he's kissing Ayumu and thrashes him only to find out that he is taking a bit of fuzz off of Ayumu's eye.
9	"The Ninth Night"; Transliteration: "Daikyū Ya" (Japanese: 第九夜)	November 29, 2012	July 8, 2013
With the Black Camellia now in his possession, Hayate's bad luck is getting worse by the minute. At the hotel they're staying, the Hakuou Three Amiga overreacts to help search for Ruri, and as Hayate tries to cease them, two cops mistake his actions as an act of indecency, then spreads panic throughout the hotel. Nagi insists Hayate to leave when Yukiji takes the clock from him, she won billions of dollars from a casino but then a group of thieves showed up and stole the money and the clock along with her car. Luckily, Hinagiku receives a call from Izumi to where the thieves are hiding. Nagi goes along with Isumi and Sakuya to where Ruri is supposed to be at. There they find a strange tree in the desert and meet a woman who appears to be a demon. When Nagi tells her the Black Camellia been stolen, the woman furiously sends out Ruri and the bird-guy, Shidou, to retrieve it while taking Nagi hostage. Hayate and Hinagiku save Izumi and Yukiji from the thieves before Ruri appears and found the blond-hair thief who has the clock. Ruri knocks out the thieves with her skills, but just as she strikes the thief with the Black Camellia, it suddenly transforms into a sword. Hayate manages to push Ruri out of the way, only to get stabbed himself.
10	"The Tenth Night"; Transliteration: "Daijū Ya" (Japanese: 第十夜)	December 6, 2012	July 9, 2013
Nagi inquires the woman about why she wants the Black Camellia, saying that it is a magical sword that grants eternity. When Hayate got stabbed by it he collapses and later gets up, however, his personality seems to have changed. The woman and the tree appear and attempt to take the Black Camellia. The thieves try to fight back as their hideout catches fire and escapes with Yukiji's money. Hayate wants to talk to the woman, but Isumi interrupts them and releases Nagi. The woman, Dolly, starts to weaken and retreats with Shidou and Ruri. As the police arrive, Nagi becomes concerned about Hayate's behavior, and then Hayate tells her that he "quits" being her butler, leaving Nagi behind. The next day, Nagi pretends to be okay without Hayate. They meet Kyonosuke with a new car saying Yukiji will pay him back for it, as he isn't aware that she has been robbed. Kyonosuke takes Nagi and Ayumu on a drive to Area 51 when Ayumu shows Nagi the Black Camellia she found last night. Then the car tire suddenly blows causing it to crash. Kyonosuke and Ayumu leave Nagi alone in the desert while looking for help. Despite shouting "HAYATE!" he doesn't show up. Nagi then starts to realize how important Hayate was to her and exclaims that she wants him back no matter what. Ayumu comes back and gives Nagi a helping hand. Meanwhile, Hayate is minding his own business when Yukiji gets him to find her money by interrogating a thief that she caught. Hayate (speaking English) reluctantly threatens the thief who gives them the location at the Starside Hotel.
11	"The Eleventh Night"; Transliteration: "Daijūichi Ya" (Japanese: 第十一夜)	December 13, 2012	July 10, 2013
Everyone gathers together gladly to help Nagi search for Hayate. The girls try to figure out the mystery about the Black Camellia, the woman Dolly, the incident from 13 years ago, and Hayate's strange behavior. When Izumi and Hinagiku mention that Hayate got stabbed the previous night, Nagi remembers something that Yukariko said about her "father", and comes to a conclusion. Ruri appears and Nagi asks her to bring her Dolly's ring as Hayate's life depends on it. Nagi orders Klaus to deliver her mother's wedding ring over immediately then lends it to her friend, Ruka Suirenji, so Hayate will notice the ring on Ruka's TV interview. Ruri finds Dolly's ring and receives an email to meet at the Starside Hotel. Tonight at Ruka's concert, Nagi's friends go there to enjoy the show. Hayate and Yukiji arrive at the hotel. Hayate goes into Ruka's dressing room and found a note written by Nagi waiting for him. In the wedding hall, Nagi reveals the Black Camellia is a sword that exchanges a person's soul and what happened 13 years ago, and thus Hayate is now Shin Hayek—Nagi's father! Shin sat down with Nagi and talks about Yukariko. Dolly shows up with a captured Ruri and demands for the Black Camellia, but Nagi and Shin explain that her beloved "King" died 13 years ago in Shin's body and Hayate is inside the clock now. Shin claims for his ring back that signifies his and Yukariko's eternal love. While Yukiji beats up the thieves, chaos rises above her and Maria caused by Dolly refusing to believe her king is dead.
12	"The Last Night"; Transliteration: "Saishūya" (Japanese: 最終夜)	December 20, 2012	July 11, 2013
Within the Black Camellia, Hayate is introduced by a tanuki who tells him how the clock's fortune functions. Meanwhile, during Ruka's performance, Isumi and Sakuya run to help Nagi. Ruri and Shidou try to defend Dolly but she rejects them. Shin protects Nagi from Dolly's wrath. The rest of the thieves are defeated when Hinagiku uses her Shirosakura to rescue Ruri from a falling pillar. Shin takes Nagi to safety and approaches a helicopter with Hinagiku and Yukiji (with her money), but then Dolly captures Nagi and creates a gigantic tree. Yukiji flies away with Hinagiku on a parachute. Dolly begins to crush Nagi after which Shin arrives with the clock and stabs himself, and requests Nagi to get his ring back for him. Shin appears before Hayate entrusting him to go save his daughter. Hayate comes after Nagi, proving to Dolly that he is not her king, and starts to crumble. The ensuing chaos causes the money-filled helicopter to get destroyed, and money starts raining all over three hotels. Hayate holds Nagi's hand and flies down on big balloons miraculously, and she confesses to loving him. Isumi and Sakuya had Ruri taken to a hospital. Shin sang a song on "8" when Yukariko appears and the two finally reunite to the afterlife. As Hayate and Nagi land safely, Dolly comes down and Nagi reveals what her beloved King's last words were before disappearing into the sky. The Black Camellia breaks, and then they go to watch Ruka's concert. While all other businesses were being taken care of, Ruri gives Nagi her father's wedding ring and leaves with Shidou who is revealed by a handsome man in a suit. Hayate and Nagi arrive at Shimoda to drop off Shin's ring and the Black Camellia on Yukariko's grave thanking them for everything.

== Hayate the Combat Butler: Cuties (2013) ==
No.	Title	Original release date	English airdate
1	"Hayate Ayasaki"; Transliteration: "Ayasaki Hayate" (Japanese: 綾崎 ハヤテ)	April 8, 2013	April 11, 2014
Hayate shops in a poverty district then experiences his misfortune. The story goes back to daily life at the Violet Mansion apartment, where Hayate and Hinagiku make an early morning preparation. Maria notices how Hayate can be so popular with the girls. The tenants; Chiharu, Kayura, and Ayumu leave for school as Nagi gets up late despite Hayate's actions to wake her when she has been trying her best to do better in life. Athena Tennousu (as Alice in child-form) barely stays awake. After school, Nagi attempts to play video games when they all should be studying for their final exam. Hayate continues his hard work preparing for tomorrow already then begins studying after midnight and Hinagiku comes to his room to tutor him, and he wakes up for just an hour of sleep and does the same early morning routine. Unfortunately, he discovers everyone is sick; except Ayumu until she fakes it. The next day, Hayate caught their cold but pretends he's fine to relieve Nagi's worries. Ruka returns from Las Vegas and gives Hayate her album since her concert has finished. By the time Hakuō Academy's final exam starts, Hayate arrives miserable due to constant errands along the way. He returns home and finds everyone has prepared dinner for him as a way of thanking him for his kindness.
2	"Nagi Sanzenin"; Transliteration: "Sanzen'in Nagi" (Japanese: 三千院 ナギ)	April 15, 2013	April 14, 2014
Nagi is playing her fierce video games until Maria instantly unplugs the TV. One morning, Nagi inadvertently awakens early at the Sanzenin Mansion and discovers how the early mornings can be so delighted. She follows the scent of cooking and found Hayate in the kitchen. After eating breakfast, Nagi tries not to get sleepy by doing some exercise which isn't easy for someone of her lifestyle. At Wataru Tachibana's video store, Nagi purposely rents an R-18 naked porn DVD mixed with a stack of random ones, however, when she presenting it to Shiranui in her treehouse Nagi found out she had grabbed an R-18 horror DVD by mistake. Ending up watching the whole film Nagi becomes terrified and screams "HAYATE!" and begs him to stay by her side all day until she'd fallen asleep, and Hayate whispers her a good dream that suppresses her fears. Maria also watches the film and its déjà vu. Shifting back at the Violet Mansion, Nagi confined herself from going to school on a soggy day. Hayate tries to persuade Nagi by using advice to motivate her. Maria lends Nagi some money saying that each yen represents life, and it is given by someone and you will never get anymore, so she should not waste it. This finally inspires Nagi to go to school together with Hayate admitting those morning days are interesting.
3	"Athena Tennousu"; Transliteration: "Tennōsu Atene" (Japanese: 天王州 アテネ)	April 22, 2013	April 15, 2014
After sleeping late again Athena (Alice) takes in some sunlight for refreshments. Hayate gave her a ringlet-shaped chocolate coronet. Suddenly, a big dog approaches Athena then licks her. She demands that Hayate should find its owner. While they search for the dog's owner on the streets, Athena disciplines the dog. Fumi appears declaring the dog, Armageddon, is hers. Armageddon quickly tackles Fumi, just as they leave Athena signs she likes Armageddon, and Fumi responds he likes her too because of her ringlet-shaped hair. The next day, Wataru struggles with the pile of money that Sakuya had delivered to him in order to keep his business funded. Hayate and Saki offer to help deposit the money into the bank account regardless of Wataru's denial. Walking on the streets, Armageddon and Yukiji suddenly appear then the dog snatches the briefcase full of money and runs off. He shows Fumi the briefcase, freaking out, Fumi plans to hand it over to the police, but her friend Sharna Alamgir warns her she would be considered a suspect. Meanwhile, Saki blames herself for losing the money. Hayate goes looking for the briefcase and finds out Armageddon brought it to Athena, but the briefcase is empty. Fumi and Sharna gather to help search for the money, then Hayate rushes for Tama to have him translate for Armageddon to know where the money is. Despite being insulted by the dog, Tama confirms the money been stolen by bandits. Tracking down their hideout, Yukiji beats up the bandits as Hayate and Wataru arrive to retrieve the money. With the money finally deposited Athena tells Wataru that he should comfort Saki, and so he does. Afterward, Nagi and Athena are left alone together for the day. They warm up some Nikuman to eat but overcook it. Thinking about what to do now, Linn the ghost priest mentions they should go find Hayate at Café Donguri to have him make dinner for them. Accepting the idea, they head out, but along the way Nagi and Athena get lost since neither are familiar with the direction. Following the uphill, they manage to arrive at the café and desperately demand Hayate make them Nikuman.
4	"Isumi Saginomiya & Sakuya Aizawa"; Transliteration: "Saginomiya Isumi & Aizawa Sakuya" (Japanese: 鷺ノ宮 伊澄 & 愛沢 咲夜)	April 29, 2013	April 16, 2014
Isumi and Sakuya are curious as to why the Saginomiya's doesn't have a maid to support them in any way. So Hatsuho went to ask Hayate to hand out flyers to recruit suitable maids to use to overcome Isumi's weakness of smartphones. Fumi chose to be a maid candidate confident in her skills. In the end, both Isumi and her mother rejected Fumi because she did not meet the standards of understanding how to use smartphones. Nagi responds Isumi doesn't need a maid. At the Aizawa mansion, Chiharu as Haru is teaching Sakuya to be modest. In a flashback, the story goes on how Chiharu been hired to be Sakuya's maid. Makita & Kunieda reach an agreement that Sakuya needs a maid by choosing one at her café. Sakuya asks Nagi why she hired Hayate as her butler in the first place; she replies that it was fate. In an arcade, Sakuya and Chiharu play virtual games together, and Sakuya felt faith in Chiharu so she had her become her maid. Back in the present, Sakuya visits Nagi then discovers Chiharu there at the Violet Mansion. She drags Sakuya away and begs her to keep her maid identity a secret. They search for ideas to draw a manga, ditching Sakuya since she can't read the manga. Isumi tries to help Sakuya to entertain herself. Sakuya hopes Nagi can still rely on her.
5	"Hinagiku Katsura"; Transliteration: "Katsura Hinagiku" (Japanese: 桂 ヒナギク)	May 6, 2013	April 17, 2014
Feeling depressed because she isn't fragile, Hinagiku wishes that Hayate would give her a shoulder massage, but is too embarrassed to ask him. Thinking about how to get him to offer her a massage, Hinagiku uses a chance while studying with Hayate in the evening, but fails. The next day, Hinagiku reflects from the previous night. Athena reassures Hinagiku and says she should try giving Hayate a hint again. Hinagiku receives a call from Hayate to meet at the Sanzenin Water Resort to deal with the troublesome Hakuou Three Amiga swimming in the artificial sea. Abruptly, their old foe Gilbert makes an appearance causing Hayate to beat him up. Gilbert provokes a 2v2 volleyball game challenge with the butler. Gilbert's partner is a new and improved Eight, and he chooses Hinagiku as Hayate's partner believing she is "fragile". Hinagiku pretends to be fragile for Hayate at the start of the game, which they didn't expect. Hayate apologizes to Hinagiku that with her on his side he thought he'd win the game. Her mood changes when Gilbert laughs at her flat-chest and hits the ball hard at Eight. Winning the game, Hinagiku exposes her swimsuit, introducing herself as the student council president of Hakuō Academy, and declares that she will not lose. That night at dinner, Hayate comes over to offer Hinagiku a shoulder massage. Overjoyed with his answer, Hinagiku happily takes him up on his offer.
6	"Hakuou Three Amiga"; Transliteration: "Segawa Izumi"	May 13, 2013	April 18, 2014
At Hakuō Academy, Risa discusses with Hayate why people have recently been calling them the "idiot trio". Izumi and Miki lash out then start arguing together with Risa, they decided to find results on who's the smartest of the three by creating an interesting film. Hayate follows Izumi firmly to where she's recording a plant growing but accidentally kills it. Next, Miki shows them some eggs she's waiting to be a hatch, however, Hayate corrects her that unfertilized eggs will never hatch. Last, Risa presents a contraption that sets off balloons but failed to notice them flying away without recording. In the end, it became clear to Hayate that the three are equally idiotic. Thinking about yesterday, the trio is in a study session alone but end up studying how to be popular. Hayate comes to check on them, and Risa tries to force him into doing something shameless to Izumi for the cute and blush research. Later, Izumi does cleaning duty as punishment for being careless of the paper that Yukiji gave her to take to the class. She puts on an embarrassing act using Miki's video camera until Shiranui scares her, and then Izumi heads home forgetting to delete the video. The next day, Miki asks Izumi whether she recorded anything with her video camera. Izumi remembers that she forgot to delete the embarrassing video; however, the memory card is not in the camera, to Izumi's relief. In the end scene, it turns out Hayate had taken the memory card from the camera.
7	"Ruka Suirenji"; Transliteration: "Suirenji Ruka" (Japanese: 水蓮寺 ルカ)	May 27, 2013	April 21, 2014
Ruka the idol is told by her manager Atsumari that she been booked to star in a bicycle commercial, telling her how lucky she is. Nagi, Hayate, and Maria are watching a recap of Ruka's concert on TV at the Violet Mansion. Ruka got the day off so she makes a surprise visit there and informs them of her amazing opportunity. Tactlessly, she doesn't know how to 'ride' a bike so she intensely desires Hayate to teach her how since he's a professional at bicycling. Ruka first practices in the yard but ruins Maria's garden. It soon gets dark, Chiharu suggests Ruka should try practicing on Hakuō Academy's grounds. Hayate strictly trains Ruka to ride a bike down a steep hill, which looks risky. He pushes her down the hill and catches her before she falls, hoping it would help overcome her fear of falling. At the end of the night, Ruka and Hayate start having fun using a squirt gun. Nagi asks Hayate if he can teach her how to ride a bike too but expects him to do it more kindly. Later, Hayate, Hinagiku, and the Hakuou Three Amiga were invited to see Ruka's next concert. Hayate receives an urgent call from Ruka and Atsumari depending on him to act as a backup dancer in a maid outfit on the stage, also Ruka wishes for his service because she's a stressed. The concert begins with Ruka singing through willpower. Before her last song, Gilbert shows up and battles Hayate. The staff members mistakenly put Gilbert's robot on the stage and go on a rampage. Hayate quickly kicks the robot off the stage, he dances with Ruka joyfully, and the concert was a success.
8	"Ayumu Nishizawa"; Transliteration: "Nishizawa Ayumu" (Japanese: 西沢 歩)	June 3, 2013	April 22, 2014
Astonished by her weight gain, Ayumu makes an effort to preserve her health. Following at Café Donguri, Hayate gives Ayumu some Nikuman he made, at that moment, she realizes her constant consumption of Hayate's food is the reason she's gaining weight. She stops herself from eating but just couldn't resist Hayate's generous offer. In a flashback, Ayumu remembers how everyone prepared a surprise birthday party for her. Hayate was baking cookies for her, Maria asks him whether he remembers the other characters' birthday, but he answers all the questions correctly. Nagi and Chiharu decide that they should throw a surprise party for Ayumu over at Café Donguri. Before they can start setting it up, Ayumu arrives! As she attempts to remind them what "today" is, they try to avoid the question by feigning ignorance until she gives up. Ayumu finally leaves after part-time and everyone quickly prepares the party. Nagi calls for Ayumu's return, but she is too dismayed, so Nagi uses a sympathetic manner to convince her. Ayumu comes back and they surprise her with the party. Feeling overjoyed, she jumps onto Nagi. Back in the present, Ayumu walks home with Hayate saying it's unsafe during the night, leaving Hokuto confused. They go to Shiomi high school, to pick up Ayumu's notebook that she forgot. Hayate thought if his parents hadn't sold him to the yakuza he probably would've accepted Ayumu's confession from before (Season 1 episode 12). As they leave, after defeating a monstrous thief, Ayumu decides she will do her best to lose weight.
9	"Chiharu Harukaze & Kayura Tsurugino"; Transliteration: "Harukaze Chiharu & Tsurugino Kayura" (Japanese: 春風 千桜 & 剣野 カユラ)	June 10, 2013	April 23, 2014
Top of the Hakuō clock tower, Chiharu is doing a speech pattern when Aika catches her unguarded. Aika responds that side of her is cute. Chiharu believes there are others who are more unguarded than herself, like Hinagiku, as she hangs out with Nagi due to their common interest. Later, Chiharu decides to have a barbecue for the tenants, and she has Hayate give her grocery shopping assistance. She asks Hayate what would he do if a girl confesses to him; he gives a serious answer. Ruka arrives at the Violent Mansion as she accepted Chiharu's invitation. Ruka asks Ayumu if Hayate would become her boyfriend even if it means kissing him, which irritates Ayumu. As Hayate and Chiharu return, Ruka also asks Hayate what would he do if a girl confesses to him. He responds to Ruka and Ayumu that Chiharu asked him the same question, but they misunderstood it to be Chiharu confessing to Hayate. Then everyone celebrates at the barbecue. Kayura is eating the kebabs and making weird remarks. In a flashback, Hayate and Nagi remember when they first met Kayura (and pitching up a tent). After Kayura rented a room at the apartment, she enrolls as a transfer student at Hakuō Academy, so Hayate and Nagi gladly give her a tour around the campus until they reach the clock tower and Hayate casually shows them Hinagiku changing. Back in the present, after the barbecue and the tenants go back to their rooms, Kayura states that you should not take your instant feelings too seriously. Hayate accidentally sees Hinagiku changing again; prompting everybody to say that Hayate is the one who is most unguarded.
10	"Maria"; Transliteration: "Maria" (Japanese: マリア)	June 17, 2013	April 24, 2014
Shiori fixes a tape recorder for Yukiji then talks about her days as a student at Hakuō Academy. 7 years ago, when Maria was the student council president, Shiori is amazed at how academic and cute Maria is, so she shows her a video of her growth...but Maria breaks it like it was an accident. In the end, it seems Maria refuses to expose any of her cute traits. At the Sanzenin Mansion, Maria discovers a love letter for Hayate; however, he wants to turn it down then Nagi returns a strict reply to the sender; a second later, the sender replies a horror letter to Hayate which now scares him. Nagi devises Hayate and Maria to go on a fake date in order to drive away from the sender. The sender is revealed to be Linn and he gets enraged at seeing Hayate dating Maria. Hayate and Maria follow Nagi's script by trying on different clothes even though it's embarrassing, with Ayumu and Hinagiku following them thinking the date is real. Last, Hayate and Maria go to an aquarium, as Linn tries to get involved with the maid, but fails. Then they run into Ayumu and Hinagiku and they ask if they're really dating, and respond it's just their imagination. At sundown, Maria hopes she'll find a boyfriend like Hayate someday.
11	"Who's knocking on the Door?" (Japanese: ドアをノック誰ですか？)	June 24, 2013	April 25, 2014
Inside Hayate's dream, the same tanuki from within the Black Camellia reappears and asks for a big request. In the morning, for some reason, Nagi won't wake up, and the sudden concern of a "kiss by Hayate" from a dream begins to creep the girls out once said they all had the same dream. During lunch, the girls discuss it would have to be someone who loves Hayate who kisses him, but Aika seriously doubts that would happen. Kayura objects that anyone would like a troublesome guy like Hayate (after showing them footage of Kyonosuke's affection for Yukiji). Worried if the dream is true and Hayate has to break this curse, he goes off to find someone whom he could kiss. He bumps into Ayumu at the exact spot where they first met believing this is his chance, but Fumi and Sharna interrupt. Hayate tried asking Athena, Ruka, and Chiharu, but naturally, they all can't do something so impulsive. Hinagiku thinks about the ominous presence that Isumi sensed earlier from Hayate, and the tanuki explained if Hayate doesn't kiss someone by the stroke of midnight he and Nagi will be separated forever.
12	"I Will Love and Be Loved in My Life" (Japanese: 私は愛する、私の人生で愛される)	July 1, 2013	April 28, 2014
Starting from the previous episode, Maria is worried about Nagi, and Hinagiku goes looking for Hayate. Kayura gives advice to (cross-dressing) Hayate on how to give a kiss. He tried to kiss Athena, but Linn and Armageddon got in the way. Ruka met up with the others and mention that she ran into Hayate earlier during an interview and also tried to kiss him except Kayura forbids it. As Hayate tried to contact Chiharu, Sakuya and Isumi are found in Shimoda to pick up the still-active Black Camellia. After more unfortunate events, in Underdog Park, Hayate finds Yukiji and reluctantly challenges her for a kiss, however before he could kiss her, Kyonosuke arrives and carry Yukiji away. Five minutes before midnight, Hayate is in a predicament now that all the other girls have found him. After Nagi talks with the tanuki inside the dream, Maria, Sakuya, and Isumi bring over the dozy Nagi to Hayate. Nagi says it doesn't matter if Hayate kisses someone or not, because she will always have him as her butler. Then, Hayate kisses her on the forehead! Hayate corrects everyone that he meant a kiss on the forehead, not on the lips, leaving the girls confused and relieved. The broken Black Camellia shows Shin and Yukariko watching them.
