= Bokeh (disambiguation) =

Bokeh is the aesthetic quality of out-of-focus areas in a photographic image.

Bokeh may also refer to:

- Bokeh, Iran, a village near Tehran, Iran
- Bokeh Kosang, a Taiwanese actor and singer
- Bokeh (film), a 2017 Sci-fi/Fantasy film
- Bokeh (library), an interactive visualization library for modern web browsers
- Bokeh (software), a CMS

== See also ==
- Boke (disambiguation)
- Bouquet (disambiguation)
