= Bamukumbit language =

Grassfields Bantu language of Cameroon

Bamukumbit
- Mankong
- Pronunciation: [maŋkɔ̃]
- Native to: Cameroon
- Native speakers: 12,000 (2008)
- Language family: Niger–Congo?: Atlantic–Congo; Volta-Congo; Benue–Congo; Bantoid; Southern Bantoid; Grassfields; Eastern Grassfields; Mbam-Nkam; Nun; Bamukumbit

Language codes
- ISO 639-3: bqt
- Glottolog: bamu1254

Bamukumbit (Mangkong) is a Grassfields Bantu language spoken in Cameroon.

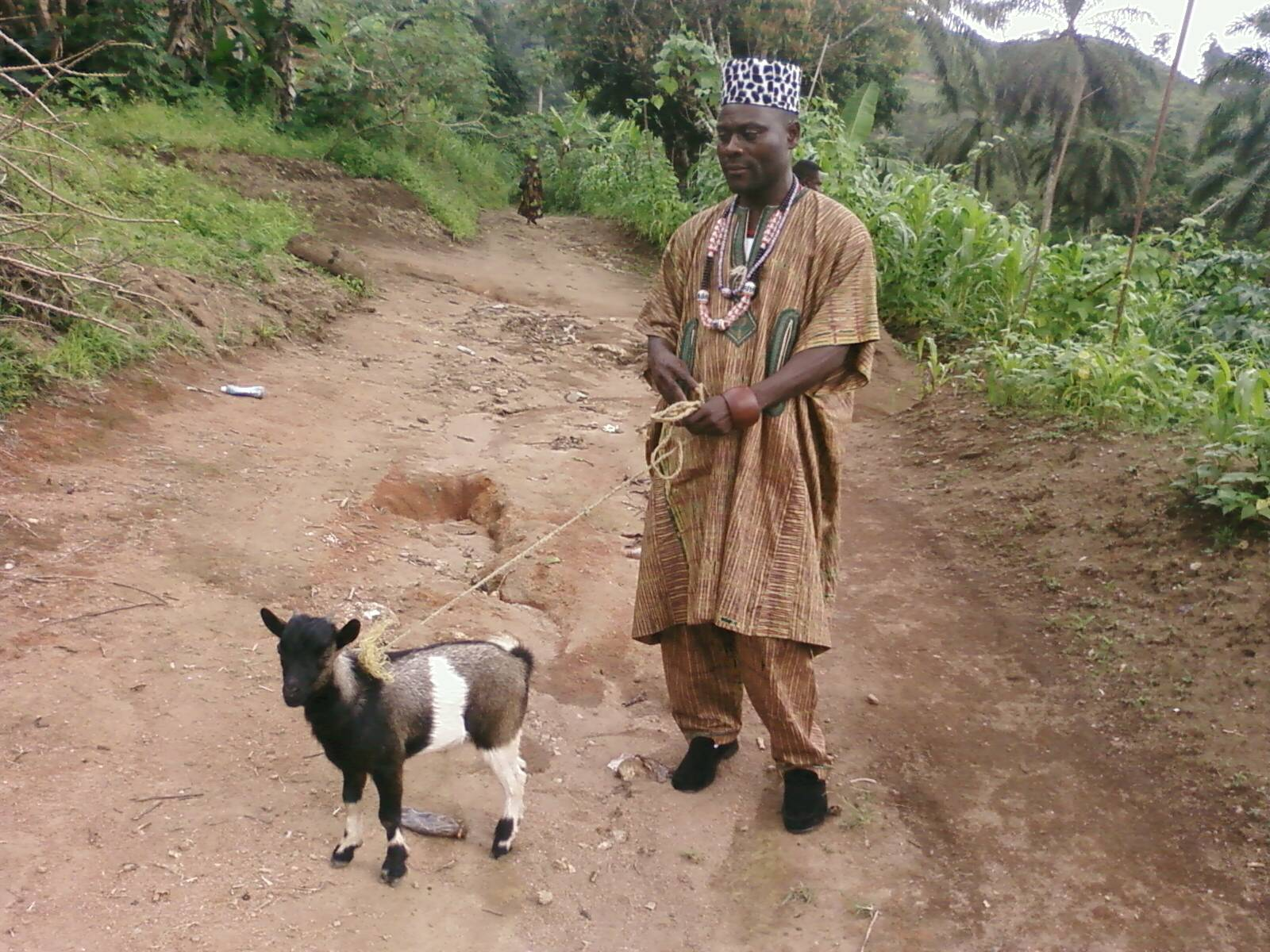
Traditional clothing called Togho

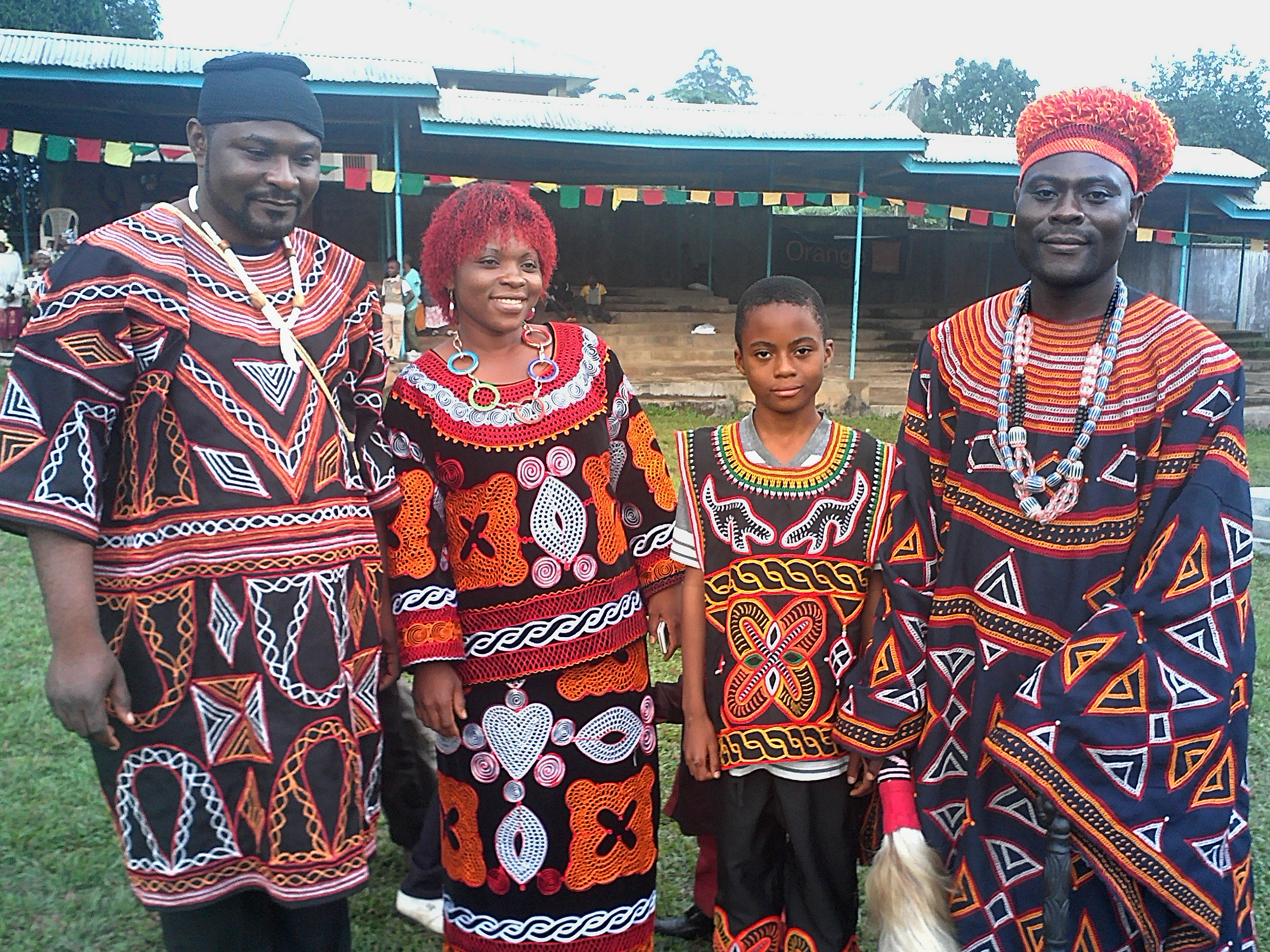
Another Togho

== Writing system ==
Bamukumbit alphabet
Majuscules	A	B	Ch	D	E	Ɛ	Ə	F	G	H	I	Ɨ	J	K
Minuscules	a	b	ch	d	e	ɛ	ə	f	g	h	i	ɨ	j	k
Majuscules	L	M	N	Ŋ	O	Ɔ	Ø	R	Sh	T	U	W	Y	ʼ
Minuscules	l	m	n	ŋ	o	ɔ	ø	r	sh	t	u	w	y	ʼ

The cedilla is used to represent nasal vowels: ⟨a̧, ɛ̧, ə̧, i̧, ɔ̧, u̧⟩.
