= John Boak =

Scottish cricketer

Personal information
- Full name: John Boak
- Born: 27 June 1837; Edinburgh, Scotland
- Died: 29 October 1876 (aged 39); Bermondsey, London, England
- Batting: Right-handed
- Bowling: Right-arm fast

Domestic team information
- Years: Team
- 1873: Middlesex

Career statistics
Competition	First-class
Matches	1
Runs scored	19
Batting average	9.50
100s/50s	–/–
Top score	11
Balls bowled	56
Wickets	1
Bowling average	37.00
5 wickets in innings	–
10 wickets in match	–
Best bowling	1/20
Catches/stumpings	2/–
- Source: Cricinfo, 3 December 2010

John Boak (27 June 1837 – 29 October 1876) was a Scottish cricketer. Boak was a right-handed batsman bowled right-arm fast. He was born at Edinburgh and educated at the Royal High School.

Boak made his only first-class appearance for Middlesex against the Marylebone Cricket Club at Lord's in 1873. In his only first-class match, he scored 19 runs at a batting average of 9.50, with a high score of 11. In the field he took 2 catches. With the ball he took a single wicket at a bowling average of 37.00, with best figures of 1/20.

Prior to his single first-class match, Boak emigrated to Australia in 1858. While there he played initially for a combined New South Wales and Victoria in the 1861/62 season. In the 1863/64 season, Boak played for New South Wales and the following season for Queensland. His matches for both New South Wales and Queensland came before either state held first-class status. He later returned to England in 1868.

Three years after playing for Middlesex, Boak was killed when he was hit by a train while crossing a railway line in Bermondsey, London on 29 October 1876.
