= Bouquet (Percy Faith album) =

Studio album by The Percy Faith Strings
- Released: 1959
- Genre: Easy listening
- Label: Columbia

Bouquet is a 1959 album by The Percy Faith Strings. It was released in 1959 by Columbia Records (catalog no. CL1322). It debuted on Billboard magazine's pop album chart on January 11, 1960, peaked at the No. 7 spot, and remained on the chart for 17 weeks.

== Track listing ==
Side A

1. "Bouquet" (Percy Faith)
2. "Tenderly"
3. "Laura"
4. "The Song from Moulin Rouge"
5. "Beyond the Sea"
6. "Autumn Leaves"

Side B

1. "Speak Low"
2. "Solitude"
3. "Deep Purple"
4. "Intermezzo"
5. "Ebb Tide"
6. "Fascination"
