= Bucket (disambiguation) =

A bucket is a cylindrical or conical open-top container for transporting liquid or granular material.

Bucket may also refer to:

== People ==
- Charles Goldenberg (1911–1986), American All-Pro National Football League player nicknamed "Buckets"
- Stewart Loewe (born 1968), former Australian rules footballer nicknamed "Buckets"
- Robert "Bucket" Hingley (born 1955), lead singer of ska band The Toasters
- "Buckethead", sometimes referred to as Bucket for short, stage name of American rock guitar player Brian Patrick Carroll (born 1969)

== Arts and entertainment ==
=== Fictional characters ===
- Charlie Bucket, the title character in the Roald Dahl novels Charlie and the Chocolate Factory and Charlie and the Great Glass Elevator
- Inspector Bucket, a central character in Charles Dickens’ novel Bleak House
- Kirby Buckets, the title character of Kirby Buckets, a television series that began airing in 2014
- The Buckets, a fictional family from the British comedy Keeping Up Appearances
  - Hyacinth Bucket, the main character in the show

=== Music ===
- Bucket!, an album by American jazz organist Jimmy Smith released in 1966
- "Bucket" (song), a 2008 song by Carly Rae Jepsen
- "Bucket", a song by Ab-Soul from the album Herbert, 2022
- "Bucket", a 2012 single by Annah Mac
- "The Bucket", the first single taken from the Kings of Leon album Aha Shake Heartbreak

=== Other uses in arts and entertainment ===
- Bucket (TV series), a 2017 BBC4 comedy drama starring Miriam Margolyes and Frog Stone
- The Buckets, a comic strip syndicated in 1990
- The bucket from The Stanley Parable: Ultra Deluxe
- The Bucket a character from the Pizza Tower Noise update

== Other uses ==
- Bucket mute, a mute for brass instruments
- Bucket seat, a seat contoured to hold one person
- Alternative name for Gravity bong, a smoking device
- Bucket (machine part), the scoop installed on different machines
- Alternative name for data bin

== See also ==
- War of the Bucket, fought by the city-states of Bologna and Modena in northern Italy in 1325
