= List of U.S. states and territories by median age =

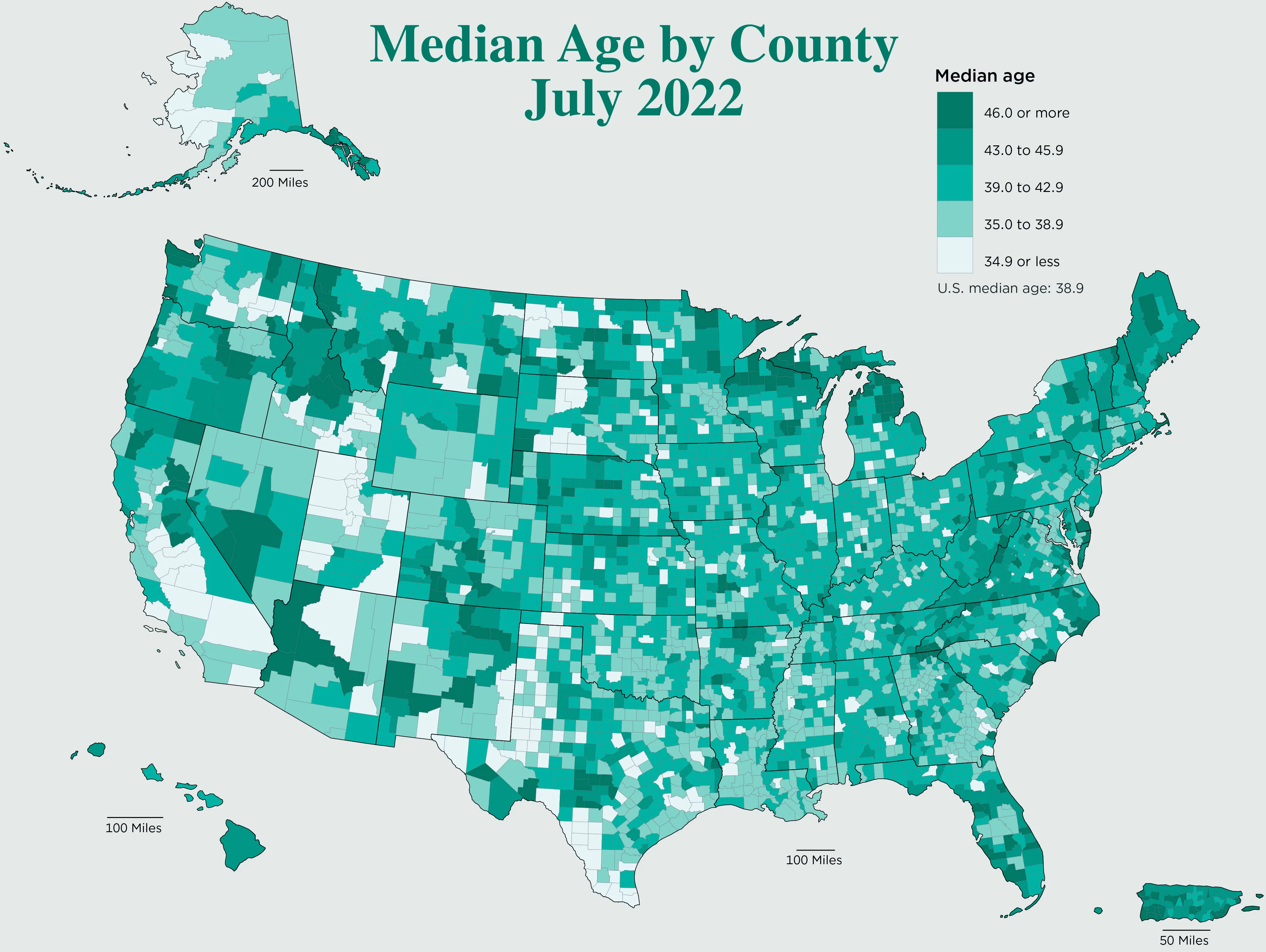
Median Age by County 2022 46 or more 43 to 45.9 39 to 42.9 35 to 39.9 34.9 or less

This is a list of U.S. states, the District of Columbia and territories by median age in 2020. (Note: State data is from 2019 Census estimates, territories data is from 2020 CIA World Factbook estimates.) The median age is the index that divides the entire population into two numerically equal age groups, one younger than that age and the other older than that age. It is the only index associated with the age distribution of a population.

Rank	State, federal district, or territory	Median age in years (Total Population) (Note: State data is from 2019 Census estimates, territories data is from 2020 CIA World Factbook estimates.)
1	U.S. Virgin Islands	45.9
2	Maine	45.0
3	Puerto Rico	43.6
4	New Hampshire	43.1
5	Vermont	43.0
5	West Virginia	43.0
7	Florida	42.7
8	Delaware	41.4
9	Connecticut	41.2
10	Pennsylvania	40.9
11	Rhode Island	40.3
12	New Jersey	40.2
12	Montana	40.2
14	Michigan	40.1
14	South Carolina	40.1
16	Wisconsin	40.0
16	Hawaii	40.0
18	Oregon	39.9
19	Massachusetts	39.7
20	Ohio	39.6
21	Alabama	39.5
22	New York	39.4
23	Kentucky	39.2
23	North Carolina	39.2
23	Maryland	39.2
26	Tennessee	39.1
26	Missouri	39.1
28	Illinois	38.8
29	Virginia	38.7
29	Wyoming	38.7
31	Iowa	38.6
31	New Mexico	38.6
31	Arkansas	38.6
34	Minnesota	38.5
34	Nevada	38.5
34	Arizona	38.5
37	Mississippi	38.3
—	United States	38.2
38	Indiana	38.0
39	Washington	37.9
40	Louisiana	37.8
41	South Dakota	37.6
42	Colorado	37.3
42	Georgia	37.3
42	Kansas	37.3
42	California	37.3
46	Idaho	37.2
47	Oklahoma	37.1
48	Nebraska	36.9
49	North Dakota	35.4
50	Alaska	35.3
51	Texas	35.2
52	District of Columbia	34.4
53	Northern Mariana Islands	34.4
54	Guam	33.7
55	Utah	31.5
56	American Samoa	27.7

== See also ==
- Demography of the United States
- List of countries by median age
