= List of countries by median age =

Country ranking

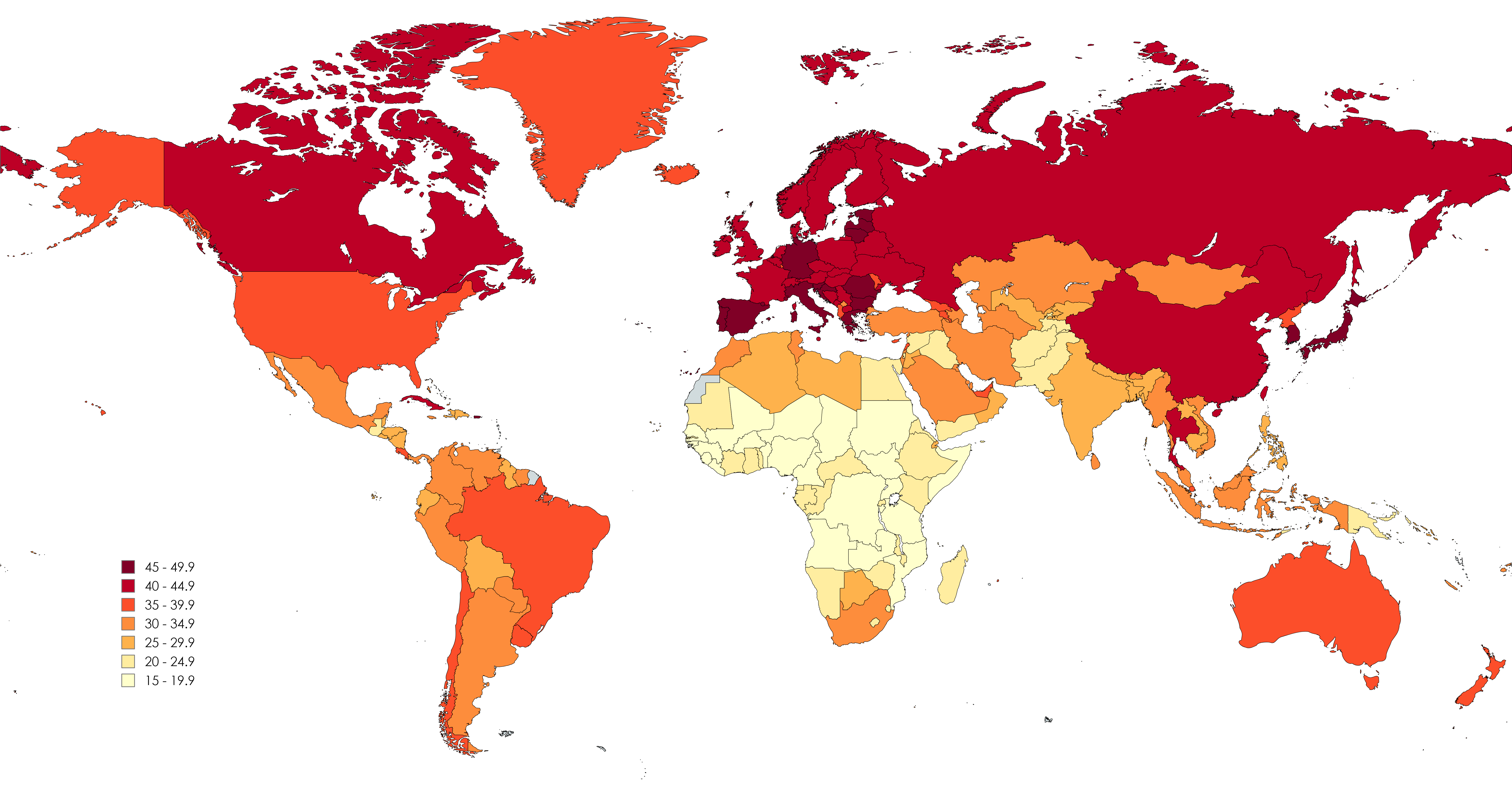
Median age by country, CIA World Factbook, 2024 est.

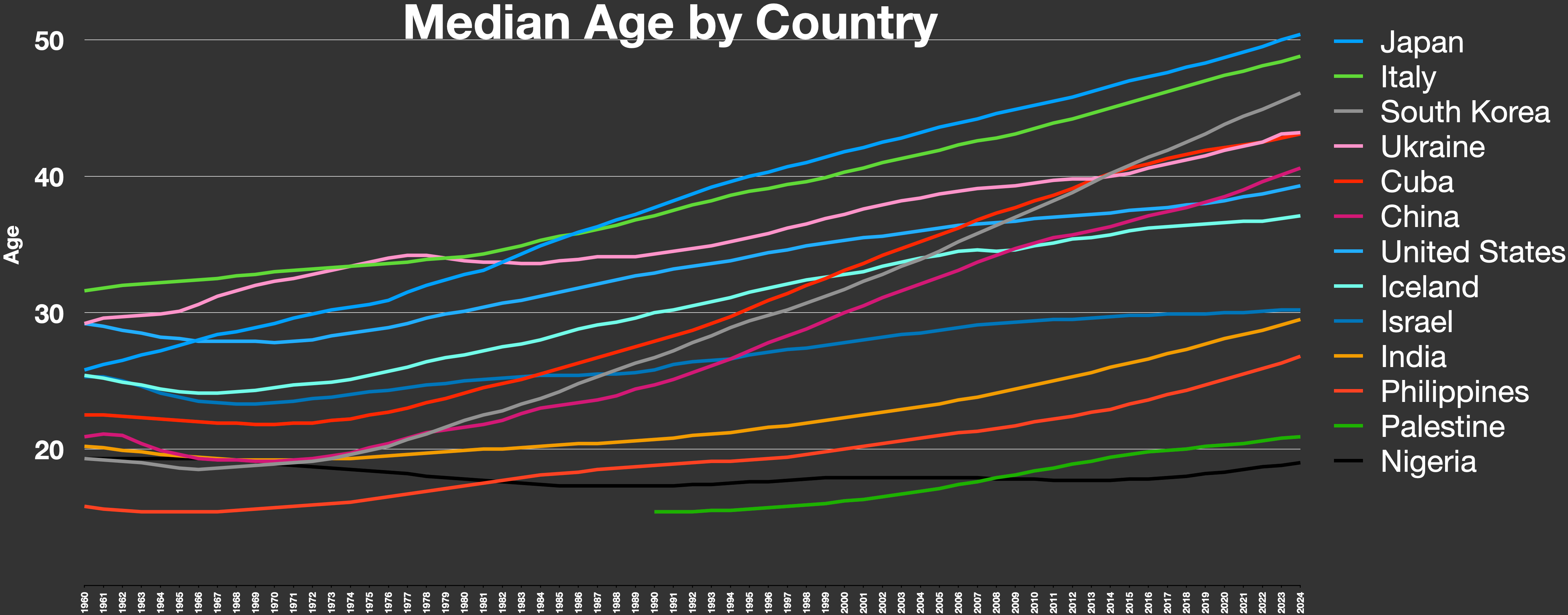
Median age by country

This article is a list of countries by median age.

== Methodology ==
The median age is the index that divides the entire population into two numerically equal age groups, one younger than that age and the other older than that age. It is the only index associated with the age distribution of a population.

Currently, the median age ranges from a low of about 18 or less in most Least Developed countries to 40 or more in most European and East Asian countries, Thailand, Canada, Cuba, and Puerto Rico. The median age of women tends to be much greater than that of men in some of the ex-Soviet republics, while in the Global South, the difference is far smaller or is reversed.

In this article, two sets of data based on Central Intelligence Agency (CIA) and United Nations (UN) estimates are provided.

== CIA figures ==
Median age per CIA World Factbook 2024 and 2020 (ranked) estimates
Rank	Country/Territory	Median ages in years				
Rank	Country/Territory	2024 median	2020 medians			
Rank	Country/Territory	Combined	Combined	Male	Female	Difference
206	Afghanistan	20.0	19.5	19.4	19.5	0.1
91	Albania	36.3	35.1	32.9	35.7	2.8
146	Algeria	29.1	28.9	28.6	29.3	0.7
141	American Samoa	30.0	27.2	26.7	27.7	1.0
4	Andorra	48.8	46.2	45.1	46.1	1.0
228	Angola	16.3	15.9	15.4	16.4	1.0
83	Anguilla	37.1	35.7	33.7	37.6	3.9
109	Antigua and Barbuda	33.9	32.7	30.7	34.4	3.7
112	Argentina	33.3	32.4	31.1	33.6	2.5
69	Armenia	38.9	36.6	35.1	38.3	3.2
56	Aruba	40.9	39.9	38.2	41.5	3.3
77	Australia	38.1	37.5	36.5	38.5	2.0
24	Austria	44.9	44.5	43.1	45.8	2.7
104	Azerbaijan	34.3	32.6	31.1	34.2	3.1
133	The Bahamas	30.7	32.8	31.7	34.0	2.3
111	Bahrain	33.4	32.9	34.4	30.3	-4.1
144	Bangladesh	29.6	27.9	27.1	28.6	1.5
50	Barbados	41.4	39.5	38.4	40.7	2.3
46	Belarus	42.1	40.9	38.0	43.9	5.9
47	Belgium	42.0	41.6	40.4	42.8	2.4
162	Belize	26.8	23.9	23.0	24.8	1.8
224	Benin	17.2	17.0	16.4	17.6	1.2
34	Bermuda	43.8	43.6	41.6	45.7	4.1
134	Bhutan	30.7	29.1	29.6	28.6	-1.0
163	Bolivia	26.6	25.3	24.5	26.0	1.5
28	Bosnia and Herzegovina	44.8	43.3	41.6	44.8	3.2
161	Botswana	27.1	25.7	24.5	26.7	2.2
101	Brazil	35.1	35.7	33.3	36.1	2.8
74	British Virgin Islands	38.5	37.2	37.0	37.5	0.5
117	Brunei	32.3	31.1	30.5	31.8	1.3
19	Bulgaria	45.1	43.7	41.9	45.6	3.7
218	Burkina Faso	18.7	17.9	17.0	18.7	1.7
220	Burundi	18.4	17.7	17.4	18.0	0.6
149	Cape Verde	28.8	26.8	25.9	27.6	1.7
154	Cambodia	27.9	26.4	25.6	27.2	1.6
216	Cameroon	18.9	18.5	18.2	18.8	0.6
41	Canada	42.6	41.8	40.6	42.9	2.3
51	Cayman Islands	41.2	40.5	39.7	41.2	1.5
202	Central African Republic	20.4	20.0	19.7	20.3	0.6
226	Chad	16.7	16.1	15.6	16.5	0.9
85	Chile	36.9	35.5	34.3	36.7	2.4
60	China	40.2	38.4	37.5	39.4	1.9
78	Christmas Island	38.0	–	–	–	–
62	Cocos (Keeling) Islands	40.0	–	–	–	–
114	Colombia	32.7	31.2	30.2	32.2	2.0
183	Comoros	22.7	20.9	20.2	21.5	1.3
225	Democratic Republic of the Congo	16.9	16.7	16.5	16.8	0.3
200	Republic of the Congo	20.7	19.5	19.3	19.7	0.4
52	Cook Islands	41.1	38.3	37.8	38.7	0.9
96	Costa Rica	35.5	32.6	32.1	33.1	1.0
195	Cote d'Ivoire	21.2	20.3	20.3	20.3	0.0
20	Croatia	45.1	43.9	42.0	45.9	3.9
40	Cuba	42.6	42.1	40.2	43.8	3.6
81	Curacao	37.8	36.7	34.4	39.5	5.1
67	Cyprus	39.5	37.9	36.7	39.4	2.7
31	Czech Republic	44.2	43.3	42.0	44.7	2.7
45	Denmark	42.2	42.0	40.9	43.1	2.2
164	Djibouti	26.3	24.9	23.0	26.4	3.4
84	Dominica	37.0	34.9	34.4	35.5	1.1
145	Dominican Republic	29.2	27.9	27.8	28.1	0.3
153	Ecuador	28.0	28.8	28.0	29.6	1.6
177	Egypt	24.4	24.1	23.8	24.5	0.7
143	El Salvador	29.7	27.7	26.2	29.3	3.1
186	Equatorial Guinea	22.1	20.3	19.9	20.7	0.8
192	Eritrea	21.3	20.3	19.7	20.8	1.1
22	Estonia	45.0	43.7	40.4	47.0	6.6
175	Eswatini (Swaziland)	24.6	23.7	22.5	24.7	2.2
203	Ethiopia	20.4	19.8	19.6	20.1	0.5
–	European Union	44.0	44.0	42.6	45.5	2.9
86	Faroe Islands	36.8	37.2	36.9	37.7	0.8
124	Fiji	31.6	29.9	29.7	30.1	0.4
36	Finland	43.3	42.8	41.3	44.4	3.1
42	France	42.6	41.7	40.0	43.4	3.4
98	French Polynesia	35.3	33.3	33.0	33.5	0.5
187	Gabon	22.0	21.0	21.4	20.6	-0.8
205	The Gambia	20.2	21.8	21.5	22.2	0.7
208	Palestine (Gaza Strip)	19.5	18.0	17.7	18.4	0.7
75	Georgia	38.3	38.6	35.9	41.4	5.5
9	Germany	46.8	47.8	46.5	49.1	2.6
191	Ghana	21.4	21.4	21.0	21.9	0.9
88	Gibraltar	36.8	35.5	34.4	36.6	2.2
10	Greece	46.5	45.3	43.7	46.8	3.1
100	Greenland	35.3	34.3	35.1	33.4	-1.7
97	Grenada	35.4	33.3	33.1	33.4	0.3
137	Guam	30.3	29.4	28.7	30.2	1.5
174	Guatemala	24.8	23.2	22.6	23.8	1.2
23	Guernsey	45.0	44.3	43.0	45.6	2.6
221	Guinea-Bissau	18.4	18.0	17.4	18.6	1.2
209	Guinea	19.4	19.1	18.9	19.4	0.5
150	Guyana	28.3	27.5	27.2	27.9	0.7
173	Haiti	25.0	24.1	23.8	24.3	0.5
168	Honduras	25.7	24.4	23.5	25.2	1.7
7	Hong Kong	47.2	45.6	44.2	46.5	2.3
27	Hungary	44.8	43.6	41.5	45.5	4.0
79	Iceland	38.0	37.1	36.6	37.7	1.1
142	India	29.8	28.7	28.0	29.5	1.5
125	Indonesia	31.5	31.1	30.5	31.8	1.3
110	Iran	33.8	31.7	31.5	32.0	0.5
184	Iraq	22.4	21.2	20.8	21.6	0.8
61	Ireland	40.2	37.8	37.4	38.2	0.8
26	Isle of Man	44.9	44.6	43.6	45.6	2.0
140	Israel	30.1	30.4	29.8	31.0	1.2
5	Italy	48.4	46.5	45.4	47.5	2.1
130	Jamaica	30.9	29.4	28.6	30.1	1.5
3	Japan	49.9	48.6	47.2	50.0	2.8
76	Jersey	38.2	37.5	36.0	39.5	3.5
172	Jordan	25.0	23.5	23.9	22.9	-1.0
121	Kazakhstan	31.9	31.6	30.3	32.8	2.5
196	Kenya	21.2	20.0	19.9	20.1	0.2
160	Kiribati	27.3	25.7	24.8	26.6	1.8
94	North Korea	35.9	34.6	33.2	36.2	3.0
15	South Korea	45.5	43.2	41.6	45.0	3.4
119	Kosovo	32.0	30.5	30.2	30.8	0.6
138	Kuwait	30.3	29.7	30.7	27.9	-2.8
151	Kyrgyzstan	28.3	27.3	26.1	28.5	2.4
170	Laos	25.4	24.0	23.7	24.4	0.7
17	Latvia	45.5	44.4	40.5	48.0	7.5
90	Lebanon	36.3	33.7	33.1	34.4	1.3
179	Lesotho	23.9	24.7	24.7	24.7	0.0
207	Liberia	19.9	18.0	17.7	18.2	0.5
165	Libya	26.2	25.8	25.9	25.7	-0.2
30	Liechtenstein	44.2	43.7	42.0	45.3	3.3
18	Lithuania	45.1	44.5	40.2	48.2	8.0
64	Luxembourg	39.9	39.5	38.9	40.0	1.1
43	Macau	42.5	40.8	40.7	40.9	0.2
59	North Macedonia	40.5	39.0	38.0	40.0	2.0
193	Madagascar	21.3	20.3	20.1	20.5	0.4
204	Malawi	20.3	16.8	16.7	16.9	0.2
122	Malaysia	31.8	29.2	28.9	29.6	0.7
120	Maldives	31.9	29.5	29.2	30.0	0.8
227	Mali	16.4	16.1	15.6	16.5	0.9
35	Malta	43.5	42.3	41.2	43.5	2.3
169	Marshall Islands	25.5	23.8	23.6	23.9	0.3
185	Mauritania	22.1	21.0	20.1	22.0	1.9
66	Mauritius	39.6	36.3	35.0	37.6	2.6
223	Mayotte	17.3	17.2	17.0	17.5	0.5
131	Mexico	30.8	29.3	28.2	30.4	2.2
152	Federated States of Micronesia	28.2	26.3	25.5	27.1	1.6
63	Moldova	39.9	37.7	36.2	39.5	3.3
1	Monaco	56.9	55.4	53.7	57.0	3.3
126	Mongolia	31.5	29.8	28.8	30.7	1.9
53	Montenegro	41.1	39.6	38.1	41.1	3.0
87	Montserrat	36.8	34.8	34.1	35.6	1.5
135	Morocco	30.6	29.1	28.7	29.6	0.9
222	Mozambique	17.3	17.0	16.3	17.6	1.3
132	Myanmar	30.8	29.2	28.3	30.0	1.7
182	Namibia	22.8	21.8	21.1	22.6	1.5
156	Nauru	27.8	27.0	28.2	25.9	-2.3
157	Nepal	27.6	25.3	23.9	26.9	3.0
44	Netherlands	42.2	42.8	41.6	44.0	2.4
103	New Caledonia	34.3	32.9	32.1	33.7	1.6
80	New Zealand	37.9	37.2	36.4	37.9	1.5
147	Nicaragua	29.0	27.3	26.4	28.2	1.8
211	Nigeria	19.3	18.6	18.4	18.9	0.5
230	Niger	15.2	14.8	14.5	15.1	0.6
116	Northern Mariana Islands	32.4	32.8	31.8	34.1	2.3
58	Norway	40.8	39.5	38.8	40.2	1.4
159	Oman	27.3	26.2	27.2	25.1	-2.1
180	Pakistan	22.9	22.0	21.9	22.1	0.2
99	Palau	35.3	33.9	32.9	35.9	3.0
127	Panama	31.5	30.1	29.6	30.5	0.9
190	Papua New Guinea	21.7	24.0	24.0	24.0	0.0
123	Paraguay	31.8	29.7	29.5	29.9	0.4
139	Peru	30.2	29.1	28.3	29.9	1.6
167	Philippines	25.7	24.1	23.6	24.6	1.0
38	Poland	42.9	41.9	40.3	43.6	3.3
11	Portugal	46.4	44.6	42.7	46.5	3.8
13	Puerto Rico	46.1	43.6	41.6	45.3	3.7
105	Qatar	34.3	33.7	35.0	28.2	-6.8
16	Romania	45.5	42.5	41.0	44.0	3.0
48	Russia	41.9	40.3	37.5	43.2	5.7
198	Rwanda	20.8	19.7	18.9	20.4	1.5
6	Saint Barthelemy	47.4	45.6	45.5	45.8	0.3
21	Saint Helena, Ascension, and Tristan da Cunha	45.1	43.2	43.2	43.3	0.1
72	Saint Kitts and Nevis	38.6	36.5	36.7	36.3	-0.4
65	Saint Lucia	39.7	36.9	35.7	38.0	2.3
106	Saint Martin	34.2	33.3	32.5	34.1	1.6
2	Saint Pierre and Miquelon	51.2	48.5	47.9	49.0	1.1
82	Saint Vincent and the Grenadines	37.6	35.3	35.4	35.1	-0.3
158	Samoa	27.4	25.6	25.3	26.0	0.7
14	San Marino	46.1	45.2	43.9	46.3	2.4
197	Sao Tome and Principe	20.8	19.3	18.9	19.7	0.8
115	Saudi Arabia	32.4	30.8	33.0	27.9	-5.1
213	Senegal	19.2	19.4	18.5	20.3	1.8
33	Serbia	43.9	43.4	41.7	45.0	3.3
71	Seychelles	38.7	36.8	36.3	37.4	1.1
210	Sierra Leone	19.4	19.1	18.5	19.7	1.2
68	Singapore	39.4	35.6	35.4	35.7	0.3
55	Sint Maarten	41.0	41.1	39.6	42.7	3.1
39	Slovakia	42.8	41.8	40.1	43.6	3.5
12	Slovenia	46.3	44.9	43.4	46.6	3.2
171	Solomon Islands	25.2	23.5	23.2	23.7	0.5
215	Somalia	19.1	18.5	18.7	18.3	-0.4
136	South Africa	30.4	28.0	27.9	28.1	0.2
217	South Sudan	18.7	18.6	18.9	18.3	-0.6
8	Spain	46.8	43.9	42.7	45.1	2.4
107	Sri Lanka	34.1	33.7	32.3	35.1	2.8
212	Sudan	19.3	18.3	18.1	18.5	0.4
118	Suriname	32.0	31.0	30.6	31.4	0.8
54	Sweden	41.1	41.1	40.1	42.1	2.0
32	Switzerland	44.2	42.7	41.7	43.7	2.0
178	Syria	24.1	23.5	23.0	24.0	1.0
29	Taiwan	44.6	42.3	41.5	43.1	1.6
181	Tajikistan	22.8	25.3	24.6	26.0	1.4
214	Tanzania	19.1	18.2	17.9	18.4	0.5
49	Thailand	41.5	39.0	37.8	40.1	2.3
201	Timor-Leste	20.6	19.6	18.9	20.2	1.3
199	Togo	20.7	20.0	19.7	20.3	0.6
166	Tonga	25.9	24.1	23.6	24.5	0.9
73	Trinidad and Tobago	38.5	37.8	37.3	38.3	1.0
102	Tunisia	34.4	32.7	32.0	33.3	1.3
108	Turkey	34.0	32.2	31.7	32.8	1.1
128	Turkmenistan	31.2	29.2	28.7	29.7	1.0
93	Turks and Caicos Islands	36.3	34.6	34.9	34.4	-0.5
155	Tuvalu	27.8	26.6	25.6	27.6	2.0
229	Uganda	16.2	15.7	14.9	16.5	1.6
25	Ukraine	44.9	41.2	38.2	44.3	6.1
95	United Arab Emirates	35.8	38.4	40.4	31.5	-8.9
57	United Kingdom	40.8	40.6	39.6	41.7	2.1
70	United States	38.9	38.5	37.2	39.8	2.6
89	Uruguay	36.5	35.5	33.8	37.3	3.5
37	U.S. Virgin Islands	43.0	41.8	40.6	42.8	2.2
148	Uzbekistan	28.9	30.1	29.4	30.7	1.3
176	Vanuatu	24.6	23.0	22.6	23.5	0.9
129	Venezuela	31.0	30.0	29.4	30.7	1.3
113	Vietnam	33.1	31.9	30.8	33.0	2.2
92	Wallis and Futuna	36.3	34.0	33.1	35.1	2.0
189	Palestine (West Bank)	21.9	21.9	21.7	22.2	0.5
–	World	31.0	31.0	30.3	31.8	1.5
188	Yemen	22.0	19.8	19.6	19.9	0.3
219	Zambia	18.4	16.9	16.7	17.0	0.3
194	Zimbabwe	21.2	20.5	20.3	20.6	0.3

== UN figures ==
Median age as determined by UN, 2019 estimate
Region, subregion, country or area	Type	1950	1955	1960	1965	1970	1975	1980	1985	1990	1995	2000	2005	2010	2015	2020
WORLD	World	23.6	23.1	22.6	22.0	21.5	21.9	22.6	23.3	24.0	25.1	26.3	27.4	28.5	29.6	30.9
UN development groups	Label/Separator	...	...	...	...	...	...	...	...	...	...	...	...	...	...	...
More developed regions	Development Group	28.5	29.0	29.5	29.9	30.6	30.9	31.9	33.1	34.4	35.8	37.3	38.7	39.9	41.0	42.0
Less developed regions	Development Group	21.4	20.7	20.0	19.2	18.8	19.3	19.9	20.8	21.8	22.9	24.1	25.2	26.4	27.7	29.0
Least developed countries	Development Group	19.3	19.1	18.7	18.3	17.9	17.7	17.5	17.4	17.6	17.9	18.2	18.6	19.0	19.5	20.3
Less developed regions, excluding least developed countries	Development Group	21.7	20.9	20.2	19.3	19.0	19.5	20.3	21.3	22.3	23.7	25.1	26.4	27.8	29.3	30.9
Less developed regions, excluding China	Development Group	20.3	20.0	19.5	18.9	18.6	18.8	19.2	19.7	20.2	21.0	21.9	23.0	24.1	25.2	26.4
Land-locked Developing Countries (LLDC)	Special other	20.1	19.8	19.5	18.7	18.3	18.3	18.5	18.4	18.3	18.2	18.3	18.7	19.1	19.7	20.4
Small Island Developing States (SIDS)	Special other	20.2	19.9	19.5	19.1	19.1	19.6	20.7	22.0	23.2	24.4	25.5	26.5	27.7	28.9	30.3
World Bank income groups	Label/Separator	...	...	...	...	...	...	...	...	...	...	...	...	...	...	...
High-income countries	Income Group	28.7	29.0	29.1	29.1	29.3	29.6	30.7	31.9	33.2	34.6	36.1	37.5	38.7	39.9	41.0
Middle-income countries	Income Group	22.1	21.5	20.9	19.9	19.5	20.1	20.8	21.7	22.6	23.9	25.2	26.5	27.8	29.1	30.7
Upper-middle-income countries	Income Group	23.0	22.0	21.5	20.3	19.8	20.7	22.0	23.2	24.4	26.3	28.4	30.5	32.2	33.7	35.4
Lower-middle-income countries	Income Group	21.1	20.8	20.3	19.5	19.1	19.3	19.6	20.0	20.5	21.2	22.0	23.0	24.2	25.4	26.6
Low-income countries	Income Group	19.0	18.9	18.6	18.4	18.0	17.7	17.6	17.4	17.4	17.5	17.5	17.7	17.9	18.4	19.0
No income group available	Income Group	21.1	19.7	18.8	17.8	18.1	18.5	21.0	23.2	24.8	26.5	27.8	28.8	30.4	32.1	32.8
Geographic regions	Label/Separator	...	...	...	...	...	...	...	...	...	...	...	...	...	...	...
Africa	Region	19.3	19.0	18.7	18.2	17.9	17.7	17.6	17.5	17.6	18.0	18.3	18.7	19.0	19.3	19.7
Asia	Region	22.1	21.3	20.7	19.8	19.5	20.0	20.9	22.0	23.0	24.4	26.0	27.4	28.8	30.3	32.0
Europe	Region	28.9	29.5	30.3	30.9	31.7	32.1	32.6	33.5	34.6	36.1	37.7	39.1	40.3	41.4	42.5
Latin America and the Caribbean	Region	19.8	19.4	18.9	18.6	18.6	19.1	19.8	20.8	21.8	23.0	24.2	25.8	27.4	29.1	31.0
Northern America	Region	30.0	30.1	29.4	28.3	28.2	28.8	29.9	31.4	32.9	34.1	35.4	36.4	37.2	37.9	38.6
Oceania	Region	27.7	27.3	26.2	25.1	24.6	25.3	26.2	27.3	28.5	29.6	30.8	31.8	32.1	32.6	33.4
Sustainable Development Goal (SDG) regions	Label/Separator	...	...	...	...	...	...	...	...	...	...	...	...	...	...	...
SUB-SAHARAN AFRICA	SDG region	19.1	18.9	18.6	18.3	17.9	17.6	17.4	17.2	17.2	17.4	17.6	17.8	17.9	18.2	18.7
Eastern Africa	Subregion	18.4	18.2	17.9	17.5	17.2	16.9	16.8	16.7	16.7	16.9	16.9	17.0	17.3	17.9	18.7
Burundi	Country/Area	19.5	18.9	18.3	17.6	17.1	17.0	17.4	16.9	16.1	14.9	15.0	16.2	17.0	17.1	17.3
Comoros	Country/Area	21.2	20.6	19.6	18.5	17.7	17.5	17.5	17.2	17.0	17.1	17.7	18.4	19.1	19.7	20.4
Djibouti	Country/Area	16.5	17.5	18.0	18.0	17.5	16.6	16.5	17.2	17.4	18.1	19.3	20.1	23.4	25.0	26.6
Eritrea	Country/Area	17.3	17.8	18.0	18.2	18.1	17.9	17.8	17.7	17.4	15.6	16.6	19.1	19.8	19.2	19.2
Ethiopia	Country/Area	17.9	18.0	18.1	18.1	18.0	17.6	17.6	17.0	16.8	16.7	16.6	16.7	17.3	18.3	19.5
Kenya	Country/Area	20.0	18.9	17.1	15.8	15.4	15.1	15.0	15.0	15.4	16.4	17.0	17.6	18.1	18.9	20.1
Madagascar	Country/Area	20.9	20.2	19.2	17.9	17.2	17.0	16.8	16.9	17.1	17.2	17.3	17.5	18.0	18.7	19.6
Malawi	Country/Area	17.1	17.7	18.0	18.1	17.9	17.4	17.1	16.8	17.5	17.4	16.9	16.6	16.6	17.2	18.1
Mauritius	Country/Area	17.3	16.9	16.7	16.7	17.8	19.5	21.5	23.1	24.9	26.8	29.0	30.5	32.9	35.6	37.5
Mayotte	Country/Area	30.3	22.7	19.4	17.9	16.7	15.6	15.4	15.6	15.9	17.0	17.7	18.3	18.5	19.0	20.1
Mozambique	Country/Area	19.1	19.2	19.0	18.7	18.4	18.2	18.3	17.8	16.5	17.7	17.6	17.3	17.0	17.1	17.6
Réunion	Country/Area	20.3	18.8	17.8	17.1	17.1	18.4	19.8	22.3	24.0	26.1	28.0	29.0	31.6	34.5	35.9
Rwanda	Country/Area	18.0	17.5	16.3	15.4	16.0	16.3	16.0	15.2	15.3	18.3	17.4	18.1	18.9	19.4	20.0
Seychelles	Country/Area	26.1	24.1	22.0	19.9	18.0	18.9	19.9	21.8	21.9	24.5	26.2	28.9	31.3	32.8	34.2
Somalia	Country/Area	19.5	19.2	18.9	18.5	18.3	18.2	18.1	18.0	17.8	17.3	16.5	16.1	15.9	16.2	16.7
South Sudan	Country/Area	18.5	18.9	19.0	19.0	18.6	18.0	17.8	17.8	17.8	17.7	17.6	17.7	18.0	18.4	19.0
Uganda	Country/Area	18.2	17.8	17.1	16.8	16.5	16.5	16.4	16.3	15.9	15.5	15.2	15.2	15.4	15.9	16.7
United Republic of Tanzania	Country/Area	16.9	17.1	17.1	17.1	17.0	16.8	16.8	16.9	17.0	17.2	17.4	17.4	17.4	17.6	18.0
Zambia	Country/Area	17.5	17.4	17.1	16.4	16.0	15.7	15.7	15.9	16.2	16.4	16.6	16.3	16.2	16.7	17.6
Zimbabwe	Country/Area	19.0	18.1	17.2	16.0	15.6	15.4	15.1	16.0	16.9	17.6	18.2	18.3	18.6	18.4	18.7
Middle Africa	Subregion	19.5	19.4	19.3	18.8	18.4	17.9	17.6	17.3	17.0	16.9	17.0	17.0	17.0	17.0	17.3
Angola	Country/Area	19.8	19.6	20.2	18.4	17.6	16.9	16.8	16.3	16.1	16.1	16.3	16.4	16.4	16.4	16.7
Cameroon	Country/Area	20.4	20.4	20.3	19.7	19.1	18.4	17.7	17.1	16.7	16.8	17.2	17.6	17.9	18.2	18.7
Central African Republic	Country/Area	22.5	22.3	21.7	21.0	20.1	19.1	18.8	18.8	18.1	18.2	18.1	18.0	17.7	17.1	17.6
Chad	Country/Area	21.5	20.7	19.9	19.2	18.6	18.2	17.5	16.8	16.2	15.8	15.5	15.4	15.6	16.0	16.6
Congo	Country/Area	20.1	19.7	19.2	18.5	17.8	17.3	16.9	17.0	17.4	18.0	18.6	18.9	19.2	18.9	19.2
Democratic Republic of the Congo	Country/Area	18.1	18.1	18.2	18.2	18.1	17.8	17.7	17.5	17.4	17.2	17.2	17.0	16.9	16.8	17.0
Equatorial Guinea	Country/Area	23.8	23.1	22.4	21.7	20.9	21.0	20.7	19.6	19.1	18.9	19.6	20.6	21.5	22.1	22.3
Gabon	Country/Area	28.1	27.9	27.3	26.4	25.4	23.4	21.4	19.9	19.3	19.0	19.3	20.0	21.2	22.3	22.5
São Tomé and Príncipe	Country/Area	24.5	24.5	24.4	20.1	16.2	16.0	16.1	15.9	15.7	16.3	17.2	17.6	18.3	18.3	18.6
Southern Africa	Subregion	20.9	20.3	19.7	19.2	18.9	19.0	19.0	19.1	19.4	20.8	22.1	23.3	24.5	25.8	27.0
Botswana	Country/Area	19.2	18.8	18.3	16.9	16.1	15.9	15.7	15.9	17.2	18.3	19.7	21.0	22.2	23.0	24.0
Eswatini	Country/Area	18.4	17.8	17.1	16.4	16.3	15.6	15.0	14.7	15.6	16.6	17.7	18.5	19.0	19.7	20.7
Lesotho	Country/Area	19.1	18.3	17.6	17.3	17.1	16.9	16.9	16.9	17.1	18.2	19.0	20.3	21.7	23.0	24.0
Namibia	Country/Area	20.9	20.3	19.5	18.9	18.4	17.7	16.7	16.4	17.5	18.0	18.5	19.5	20.5	21.1	21.8
South Africa	Country/Area	21.1	20.6	19.9	19.4	19.1	19.3	19.4	19.5	19.8	21.3	22.6	23.8	25.0	26.4	27.6
Western Africa	Subregion	19.2	19.1	18.9	18.7	18.4	18.0	17.6	17.3	17.2	17.4	17.7	17.7	17.8	17.9	18.2
Benin	Country/Area	24.2	22.3	20.9	20.0	19.1	18.3	17.7	17.3	17.1	17.2	17.3	17.6	17.9	18.2	18.8
Burkina Faso	Country/Area	19.5	19.4	19.1	18.8	18.3	17.8	17.1	16.6	16.3	16.3	16.4	16.6	16.7	17.0	17.6
Cabo Verde	Country/Area	23.0	21.7	20.5	16.8	15.7	15.8	16.0	16.9	16.8	17.1	18.0	19.8	22.6	25.1	27.6
Côte d'Ivoire	Country/Area	18.3	18.8	18.9	18.6	17.8	17.8	17.5	17.5	17.5	17.8	18.0	17.8	17.9	18.3	18.9
Gambia	Country/Area	17.9	18.0	18.5	19.0	19.0	18.7	18.4	18.1	18.2	17.1	16.5	16.7	17.1	17.5	17.8
Ghana	Country/Area	17.1	17.6	17.8	17.7	16.8	16.5	16.4	17.1	17.6	18.1	18.5	19.2	20.0	20.7	21.5
Guinea	Country/Area	21.9	20.8	20.1	19.6	19.2	19.0	18.3	17.8	17.5	17.0	16.7	16.4	16.7	17.1	18.0
Guinea-Bissau	Country/Area	21.8	21.1	20.4	20.1	19.7	19.7	18.3	17.3	16.8	16.8	17.0	17.6	18.1	18.4	18.8
Liberia	Country/Area	19.1	19.3	19.3	19.1	18.3	17.9	17.5	17.3	17.4	18.0	18.4	18.4	18.5	18.8	19.4
Mali	Country/Area	20.9	20.1	19.5	19.3	18.8	18.5	17.9	17.4	16.5	16.5	16.6	16.5	16.2	16.0	16.3
Mauritania	Country/Area	17.9	18.0	17.8	17.4	17.0	16.9	17.1	17.3	17.4	17.6	17.9	18.5	19.1	19.6	20.1
Niger	Country/Area	15.2	15.6	15.8	15.6	15.6	15.7	16.0	15.7	15.8	16.0	15.9	15.4	15.0	14.9	15.2
Nigeria	Country/Area	19.1	19.1	19.1	19.0	18.7	18.3	18.0	17.5	17.4	17.7	17.9	18.0	17.9	17.9	18.1
Senegal	Country/Area	19.1	18.6	18.2	17.7	17.7	17.7	16.8	16.4	16.5	16.9	17.3	17.8	18.0	18.1	18.5
Sierra Leone	Country/Area	20.4	20.9	21.0	20.8	20.3	19.5	18.8	18.3	18.0	17.7	17.7	17.9	18.2	18.7	19.4
Togo	Country/Area	19.4	18.9	18.5	18.1	17.6	17.1	16.8	16.7	16.8	17.1	18.0	18.3	18.5	18.8	19.4
NORTHERN AFRICA AND WESTERN ASIA	SDG region	20.3	20.0	19.4	18.5	18.2	18.4	18.7	19.1	19.6	20.5	21.7	23.1	24.6	25.9	27.0
Northern Africa	Subregion	19.8	19.5	18.7	17.8	17.6	17.7	18.0	18.5	19.0	19.9	21.2	22.7	24.0	24.8	25.5
Algeria	Country/Area	19.4	18.5	17.8	16.6	16.4	16.5	16.7	17.1	18.0	19.4	21.7	24.1	26.0	27.5	28.5
Egypt	Country/Area	20.5	20.7	19.9	19.0	19.1	19.2	19.4	19.5	19.7	20.2	21.1	22.5	23.7	24.3	24.6
Libya	Country/Area	21.0	19.8	19.3	18.5	17.0	16.1	16.1	17.4	18.5	20.2	22.1	24.0	25.7	27.1	28.8
Morocco	Country/Area	19.5	19.2	18.1	16.3	16.2	16.8	17.8	18.7	19.8	21.1	22.7	24.5	26.4	27.9	29.5
Sudan	Country/Area	18.1	17.8	17.5	17.1	16.8	16.5	16.4	16.6	17.0	17.7	17.9	18.1	18.3	18.9	19.7
Tunisia	Country/Area	20.3	19.4	18.5	17.5	17.0	17.8	18.6	19.9	21.3	23.1	25.1	27.2	29.3	31.3	32.8
Western Sahara	Country/Area	18.7	20.1	20.8	21.1	20.2	16.7	21.2	21.4	21.1	21.2	22.3	24.2	25.5	26.8	28.4
Western Asia	Subregion	20.7	20.5	20.0	19.2	18.8	19.0	19.3	19.8	20.2	21.2	22.1	23.4	25.1	26.8	28.2
Armenia	Country/Area	22.4	22.7	22.4	20.6	20.3	21.8	23.5	25.3	27.2	29.4	30.6	31.8	32.9	33.8	35.4
Azerbaijan	Country/Area	21.7	22.1	22.0	19.1	18.2	19.1	20.9	22.8	24.1	24.6	25.6	27.1	28.7	30.3	32.3
Bahrain	Country/Area	18.9	19.2	19.6	16.8	17.5	19.3	22.3	25.2	25.4	26.4	26.6	27.8	30.1	31.2	32.5
Cyprus	Country/Area	23.7	24.4	23.0	23.4	26.0	27.4	28.3	29.1	29.9	31.0	31.8	32.9	33.9	34.9	37.3
Georgia	Country/Area	27.3	27.4	27.8	28.0	28.2	28.5	29.1	29.8	31.0	32.8	34.7	35.9	37.0	37.7	38.3
Iran (Islamic Republic of)	Country/Area	21.9	20.9	19.6	18.0	17.7	18.1	18.0	17.2	17.2	18.6	21.2	24.1	27.0	29.7	32.0
Iraq	Country/Area	22.0	20.3	19.6	18.6	17.5	17.0	16.6	16.7	16.8	17.5	18.2	18.7	18.8	20.0	21.0
Israel	Country/Area	25.5	24.6	24.1	23.4	23.5	24.1	25.0	25.4	25.9	27.3	28.0	28.7	30.1	30.2	30.5
Jordan	Country/Area	17.2	17.6	18.0	17.4	17.1	16.4	15.5	16.3	16.8	19.1	19.6	20.6	21.3	22.1	23.8
Kuwait	Country/Area	21.4	22.7	23.4	21.3	18.9	17.8	20.5	22.3	23.5	26.6	27.8	28.2	29.5	33.5	36.8
Lebanon	Country/Area	23.2	22.0	20.4	18.7	18.7	19.5	19.9	20.0	20.7	23.2	25.1	25.6	27.8	27.6	29.6
Oman	Country/Area	18.8	18.5	18.0	17.4	16.9	17.1	17.6	17.5	17.9	20.9	20.9	22.9	26.2	29.0	30.6
Qatar	Country/Area	18.9	19.4	19.4	20.5	22.0	23.2	23.4	26.9	28.7	29.0	30.5	31.0	31.6	31.5	32.3
Saudi Arabia	Country/Area	19.0	18.8	18.5	18.2	18.0	18.0	18.4	19.3	19.5	19.4	21.3	23.7	26.0	30.0	31.8
State of Palestine	Country/Area	17.3	17.0	16.8	16.1	15.3	14.8	15.1	15.5	15.7	15.7	16.0	17.0	18.2	19.5	20.8
Syrian Arab Republic	Country/Area	20.3	18.8	17.0	15.8	15.9	15.8	15.5	15.6	16.3	17.5	18.7	19.6	21.1	23.6	25.6
Turkey	Country/Area	19.7	19.8	19.4	19.1	19.0	19.6	20.0	21.0	22.1	23.5	24.9	26.6	28.3	29.9	31.5
United Arab Emirates	Country/Area	18.9	18.4	17.8	20.2	22.8	25.5	26.2	26.2	26.6	27.7	28.0	29.7	31.8	32.6	32.6
Yemen	Country/Area	18.9	18.9	18.8	18.6	17.6	15.9	15.2	14.8	14.4	14.9	15.5	16.6	17.9	19.1	20.2
CENTRAL AND SOUTHERN ASIA	SDG region	21.1	20.6	20.1	19.4	19.1	19.4	19.7	20.0	20.4	21.0	22.0	23.2	24.5	26.0	27.6
Central Asia	Subregion	23.6	23.5	22.6	20.5	19.2	19.6	20.5	21.3	21.6	21.7	22.6	23.9	25.0	26.3	27.6
Kazakhstan	Country/Area	23.2	23.3	22.9	22.4	21.8	22.3	23.5	24.6	26.0	27.1	27.8	28.6	28.9	29.4	30.7
Kyrgyzstan	Country/Area	25.3	25.3	24.0	21.6	19.4	19.6	20.9	21.7	21.8	21.6	22.5	23.8	24.0	25.1	26.0
Tajikistan	Country/Area	22.3	22.4	21.6	18.6	17.1	17.6	18.2	18.4	18.1	17.8	18.3	19.8	21.3	22.0	22.4
Turkmenistan	Country/Area	23.5	23.0	21.7	18.7	17.7	18.0	18.7	19.4	19.6	20.1	21.7	23.0	24.4	25.6	26.9
Uzbekistan	Country/Area	23.9	23.6	22.2	19.0	17.5	18.0	18.9	19.6	19.6	19.8	21.0	22.8	24.5	26.2	27.8
Southern Asia	Subregion	21.0	20.5	20.0	19.4	19.1	19.4	19.7	19.9	20.3	21.0	22.0	23.1	24.5	26.0	27.6
Afghanistan	Country/Area	19.4	19.2	18.8	18.4	17.9	17.3	16.9	16.2	15.8	16.0	15.5	16.0	15.9	17.2	18.4
Bangladesh	Country/Area	19.3	19.3	19.0	18.4	17.8	17.7	17.4	17.8	18.6	19.6	21.0	22.5	24.0	25.7	27.6
Bhutan	Country/Area	18.0	18.5	18.8	18.9	18.9	18.5	18.3	18.0	18.1	18.4	19.5	21.4	23.3	25.7	28.1
India	Country/Area	21.3	20.7	20.2	19.6	19.3	19.7	20.2	20.6	21.1	21.8	22.7	23.8	25.1	26.8	28.4
Maldives	Country/Area	18.6	19.8	20.3	19.8	17.3	17.1	17.1	16.8	16.2	16.7	18.7	22.2	24.9	28.6	29.9
Nepal	Country/Area	20.5	20.2	19.9	19.5	19.2	19.4	19.3	19.0	18.7	19.0	19.3	20.2	21.7	22.2	24.6
Pakistan	Country/Area	19.8	20.1	20.1	19.9	19.3	18.6	18.5	18.6	18.5	18.4	18.8	19.6	20.7	21.8	22.8
Sri Lanka	Country/Area	21.2	20.0	19.1	19.1	19.6	20.6	21.7	22.8	24.2	25.8	27.6	29.0	30.4	32.3	34.0
EASTERN AND SOUTH-EASTERN ASIA	SDG region	22.8	21.8	21.2	20.1	19.7	20.5	21.9	23.4	24.7	26.8	29.1	31.4	33.4	34.9	36.6
Eastern Asia	Subregion	23.4	22.2	21.6	20.6	20.2	21.2	22.9	24.4	25.8	28.1	30.7	33.3	35.8	37.7	39.4
China	Country/Area	23.9	22.2	21.3	19.8	19.3	20.3	21.9	23.5	24.9	27.4	30.0	32.6	35.0	36.7	38.4
China, Hong Kong SAR	Country/Area	23.7	24.0	23.4	21.3	21.7	23.1	25.7	28.3	31.0	34.0	36.2	39.1	41.2	43.2	44.8
China, Macao SAR	Country/Area	25.7	25.2	21.3	17.6	18.8	22.6	25.7	27.6	28.9	31.1	33.4	34.4	36.3	37.5	39.3
Dem. People's Republic of Korea	Country/Area	18.0	19.1	19.9	21.1	21.0	19.6	21.8	23.5	25.0	27.3	29.4	31.5	33.0	34.1	35.3
Taiwan	Country/Area	18.8	17.9	17.5	17.8	18.9	20.8	23.2	25.0	27.5	29.8	32.0	34.6	37.2	39.7	42.5
Japan	Country/Area	22.3	23.6	25.4	27.2	28.8	30.3	32.5	35.0	37.3	39.4	41.2	43.0	44.7	46.4	48.4
Mongolia	Country/Area	25.0	24.3	23.0	20.4	18.3	17.5	17.8	18.5	19.3	20.3	22.0	24.0	25.7	27.1	28.2
Republic of Korea	Country/Area	19.0	18.9	18.6	18.4	19.0	19.9	22.1	24.3	27.0	29.3	31.9	34.8	38.0	40.8	43.7
South-Eastern Asia	Subregion	20.4	20.2	19.5	18.6	18.1	18.4	19.1	20.0	21.3	22.6	24.2	25.5	27.3	28.8	30.2
Brunei Darussalam	Country/Area	22.4	21.1	19.4	17.7	18.4	19.6	20.2	21.2	23.1	24.0	25.5	26.8	27.5	29.9	32.3
Cambodia	Country/Area	18.7	17.9	17.2	16.7	17.0	17.6	19.1	18.5	17.9	17.3	18.1	20.4	22.7	24.0	25.6
Indonesia	Country/Area	20.0	20.4	20.2	19.4	18.6	18.5	19.1	19.9	21.3	22.8	24.4	25.6	27.2	28.5	29.7
Lao People's Democratic Republic	Country/Area	19.8	19.4	19.0	18.8	18.7	18.6	17.7	17.6	17.6	17.6	18.0	19.1	20.7	22.8	24.4
Malaysia	Country/Area	19.8	18.5	17.6	16.9	17.6	18.6	19.5	20.5	21.6	22.5	23.8	25.0	26.0	28.2	30.3
Myanmar	Country/Area	22.0	21.5	20.5	19.3	18.6	18.7	19.1	19.6	20.7	22.0	23.3	24.5	26.1	27.5	29.0
Philippines	Country/Area	18.2	17.2	16.5	16.3	16.7	17.4	18.0	18.7	19.2	19.8	20.5	21.3	23.1	24.1	25.7
Singapore	Country/Area	20.0	19.4	18.8	18.1	19.7	21.9	24.5	27.3	29.3	32.4	34.8	36.4	37.9	39.7	42.2
Thailand	Country/Area	18.6	18.9	18.8	18.3	18.0	18.5	19.7	21.8	24.3	26.6	30.2	32.8	35.5	37.9	40.1
Timor-Leste	Country/Area	18.1	18.4	18.9	19.4	19.9	19.7	19.4	20.1	20.6	20.4	17.6	17.6	18.2	19.6	20.8
Viet Nam	Country/Area	24.5	23.6	21.9	19.2	18.2	18.3	19.1	20.0	21.1	22.3	24.2	26.4	28.5	30.5	32.5
LATIN AMERICA AND THE CARIBBEAN	SDG region	19.8	19.4	18.9	18.6	18.6	19.1	19.8	20.8	21.8	23.0	24.2	25.8	27.4	29.1	31.0
Caribbean	Subregion	20.4	20.2	19.9	19.6	19.5	20.0	21.2	22.4	23.8	25.1	26.6	27.8	28.8	30.2	31.9
Antigua and Barbuda	Country/Area	19.2	18.8	18.5	17.8	17.4	19.0	21.0	23.1	25.2	26.5	28.1	29.5	31.1	32.6	34.0
Aruba	Country/Area	18.5	18.1	18.1	19.1	20.8	23.9	26.0	28.0	31.2	32.5	34.4	36.2	38.4	40.1	41.0
Bahamas	Country/Area	20.7	20.1	19.3	18.7	19.1	19.7	20.2	21.8	23.6	25.0	27.0	28.1	29.4	30.9	32.3
Barbados	Country/Area	24.6	24.2	22.4	20.7	21.2	23.7	24.4	26.3	28.4	31.2	33.7	35.5	37.3	39.0	40.5
Cuba	Country/Area	22.3	22.4	22.9	22.3	22.2	22.6	24.1	25.6	27.7	30.2	32.8	35.6	38.4	40.8	42.2
Curaçao	Country/Area	22.6	21.4	19.9	19.6	19.7	20.7	23.3	25.8	28.6	31.9	35.5	37.8	39.6	40.9	41.6
Dominican Republic	Country/Area	17.1	16.8	16.0	15.5	16.0	17.0	18.1	19.2	20.3	21.4	22.5	23.7	25.0	26.5	28.0
Grenada	Country/Area	16.3	17.1	15.6	15.2	15.4	17.8	18.8	20.0	20.4	22.1	23.9	26.0	29.2	30.6	32.0
Guadeloupe	Country/Area	20.9	20.3	19.2	17.6	18.1	18.6	21.4	24.8	27.8	30.4	32.2	35.6	38.6	41.9	43.7
Haiti	Country/Area	20.2	20.0	19.8	19.5	19.1	19.3	19.3	18.8	18.5	18.5	19.1	20.3	21.5	22.7	24.0
Jamaica	Country/Area	22.2	22.0	19.8	18.6	17.2	17.4	19.5	20.6	22.2	23.5	24.9	26.2	27.5	29.0	30.7
Martinique	Country/Area	21.9	19.9	19.2	17.9	19.1	19.0	23.5	26.0	28.3	31.4	34.1	37.4	40.5	45.0	47.0
Puerto Rico	Country/Area	18.4	18.5	18.5	21.2	21.7	22.7	24.7	26.3	28.6	30.4	32.3	33.4	34.7	38.0	44.5
Saint Lucia	Country/Area	20.7	20.1	17.7	16.4	14.9	16.5	17.5	18.9	21.4	23.1	24.2	26.1	30.3	32.4	34.5
Saint Vincent and the Grenadines	Country/Area	15.4	14.9	15.2	14.8	15.1	16.1	17.5	19.1	20.4	22.3	24.2	26.3	29.2	31.6	32.9
Trinidad and Tobago	Country/Area	20.9	19.4	18.7	18.2	18.8	20.1	21.6	22.7	24.1	25.7	27.7	29.8	31.9	33.8	36.2
United States Virgin Islands	Country/Area	22.0	21.5	21.1	20.3	23.2	20.3	22.2	24.0	28.3	30.8	33.7	36.5	39.2	41.3	42.6
Central America	Subregion	18.6	17.8	17.2	16.8	16.7	16.9	17.4	18.3	19.3	20.7	22.1	23.6	25.0	26.6	28.2
Belize	Country/Area	20.8	18.6	17.8	16.5	16.3	16.0	16.4	17.2	17.9	18.4	19.2	20.3	21.9	23.7	25.5
Costa Rica	Country/Area	18.3	18.1	17.4	17.2	17.8	19.1	20.5	21.9	23.0	24.1	25.3	27.2	29.1	31.2	33.5
El Salvador	Country/Area	18.5	18.1	17.6	17.1	17.1	17.4	17.9	18.6	19.6	20.9	22.0	23.0	24.2	25.7	27.6
Guatemala	Country/Area	18.4	17.8	17.2	16.8	16.9	17.0	16.8	16.6	16.9	17.2	17.7	18.5	19.7	21.3	22.9
Honduras	Country/Area	18.8	17.9	17.0	16.3	16.1	16.1	16.2	16.4	16.9	17.5	18.2	19.3	20.7	22.5	24.3
Mexico	Country/Area	18.6	17.8	17.2	16.8	16.7	16.9	17.4	18.5	19.7	21.3	22.9	24.7	26.2	27.7	29.2
Nicaragua	Country/Area	18.2	17.4	16.4	15.4	15.8	16.2	16.4	16.4	16.9	17.9	19.3	21.1	22.9	24.6	26.5
Panama	Country/Area	18.8	18.4	18.0	17.8	17.8	18.3	19.1	20.3	21.7	23.1	24.5	25.9	27.2	28.4	29.7
South America	Subregion	20.1	19.8	19.4	19.1	19.2	19.9	20.7	21.6	22.6	23.7	24.9	26.5	28.2	30.1	32.1
Argentina	Country/Area	25.4	26.0	26.6	26.9	27.1	27.2	27.2	27.1	27.0	27.1	27.6	28.5	29.6	30.5	31.5
Bolivia (Plurinational State of)	Country/Area	20.6	19.8	19.3	19.3	19.3	19.4	19.5	19.7	20.0	20.5	21.1	21.9	22.9	24.1	25.6
Brazil	Country/Area	19.2	19.9	20.6	22.3	23.6	24.5	25.3	26.4	27.6	28.2	29.5	30.9	32.0	33.4	35.2
Chile	Country/Area	20.6	20.7	20.6	20.4	20.6	21.6	22.9	24.3	25.7	27.0	28.7	30.5	32.2	33.7	35.4
Colombia	Country/Area	18.1	17.4	16.7	16.2	16.7	17.8	19.1	20.5	21.9	22.9	24.1	25.7	27.5	29.5	31.3
Ecuador	Country/Area	20.4	19.3	18.4	17.8	17.7	18.0	18.7	19.5	20.5	21.6	22.6	23.7	25.0	26.5	27.9
French Guiana	Country/Area	26.6	25.5	24.8	22.5	21.7	21.0	23.1	23.8	24.1	23.9	23.9	23.5	24.6	24.8	25.1
Guyana	Country/Area	20.4	18.6	16.9	16.1	16.3	17.3	18.2	19.2	21.1	21.7	22.7	23.1	24.5	25.0	26.7
Paraguay	Country/Area	16.5	16.2	16.0	16.1	16.7	17.6	18.4	18.9	19.3	19.6	20.3	21.7	23.1	24.7	26.3
Peru	Country/Area	19.2	18.7	18.2	17.7	17.6	17.9	18.5	19.2	20.1	21.2	22.7	24.1	25.5	27.5	31.0
Suriname	Country/Area	20.1	19.0	16.7	16.2	15.9	16.1	18.9	21.4	22.6	23.6	24.8	25.5	26.7	27.9	29.0
Uruguay	Country/Area	27.8	28.4	28.9	29.3	29.7	30.0	30.2	30.4	30.7	31.1	31.6	32.7	33.9	35.0	35.8
Venezuela (Bolivarian Republic of)	Country/Area	17.2	17.3	17.0	16.9	17.1	17.9	18.9	19.9	20.9	22.0	23.2	24.5	25.8	27.3	29.6
AUSTRALIA/NEW ZEALAND	SDG region	30.2	29.9	29.2	27.9	27.1	27.8	29.1	30.5	31.9	33.4	35.2	36.4	36.8	37.2	37.9
Australia	Country/Area	30.4	30.2	29.6	28.3	27.4	28.1	29.3	30.7	32.1	33.6	35.4	36.5	36.8	37.2	37.9
New Zealand	Country/Area	29.4	28.7	27.4	25.8	25.6	26.3	27.9	29.5	31.1	32.6	34.3	35.5	36.6	37.3	38.0
OCEANIA (EXCLUDING AUSTRALIA AND NEW ZEALAND)	SDG region	19.6	18.9	18.3	17.8	17.8	18.0	18.3	18.6	19.2	19.8	20.4	21.2	21.9	22.5	23.2
Melanesia	Subregion	19.7	19.0	18.4	18.0	18.0	18.1	18.2	18.5	18.9	19.5	20.1	21.0	21.6	22.1	22.8
Fiji	Country/Area	16.6	16.0	15.8	16.4	17.7	18.9	19.5	20.3	20.9	21.6	22.1	25.3	26.5	27.0	27.9
New Caledonia	Country/Area	22.5	22.4	22.0	21.6	21.5	21.3	21.5	22.2	23.3	25.3	27.2	28.6	30.6	32.0	33.6
Papua New Guinea	Country/Area	20.3	19.5	18.9	18.2	18.0	18.0	18.0	18.2	18.7	19.3	19.8	20.4	20.9	21.5	22.4
Solomon Islands	Country/Area	18.3	18.6	18.3	18.3	18.2	16.3	16.3	16.2	17.0	17.9	18.7	19.1	19.5	19.6	19.9
Vanuatu	Country/Area	16.8	16.8	16.8	16.8	17.3	17.3	17.5	17.7	18.1	18.5	18.8	19.8	21.2	20.8	21.1
Micronesia	Subregion	21.3	20.2	18.9	18.3	18.2	18.7	19.3	20.2	21.6	21.9	23.2	23.7	24.6	25.6	26.8
Guam	Country/Area	22.8	22.3	21.2	20.9	20.7	21.6	22.6	23.9	25.2	26.3	27.3	28.3	29.2	30.1	31.4
Kiribati	Country/Area	19.2	18.7	17.7	16.9	17.3	18.6	19.4	19.5	20.4	19.6	19.7	20.7	21.6	22.3	23.0
Micronesia (Fed. States of)	Country/Area	19.8	18.4	17.4	16.6	16.7	16.1	16.2	16.9	17.6	17.7	18.9	19.5	21.5	22.8	24.4
Polynesia	Subregion	17.1	17.0	16.6	15.8	15.7	16.7	18.0	19.1	20.3	21.2	22.2	23.5	25.0	26.5	27.6
French Polynesia	Country/Area	18.7	18.5	18.3	17.4	17.2	18.3	19.5	20.9	22.0	23.5	25.6	27.1	29.2	31.5	33.6
Samoa	Country/Area	16.6	15.6	15.2	14.5	14.7	15.0	16.4	17.6	18.7	19.1	19.5	20.3	20.8	20.9	21.8
Tonga	Country/Area	15.5	17.2	17.3	16.9	15.9	16.9	18.3	18.4	19.7	19.8	19.9	21.0	21.2	21.9	22.4
EUROPE AND NORTHERN AMERICA	SDG region	29.2	29.6	30.1	30.3	30.9	31.1	31.9	32.9	34.1	35.5	36.9	38.3	39.4	40.4	41.3
EUROPE	SDG subregion	28.9	29.5	30.3	30.9	31.7	32.1	32.6	33.5	34.6	36.1	37.7	39.1	40.3	41.4	42.5
Eastern Europe	Subregion	25.9	27.0	28.0	29.2	30.9	31.1	31.5	32.4	33.6	35.1	36.5	37.6	38.5	39.5	40.8
Belarus	Country/Area	27.2	27.7	28.2	28.9	30.3	30.7	31.3	32.0	33.1	34.7	36.5	38.1	38.9	39.5	40.3
Bulgaria	Country/Area	27.3	28.9	30.4	32.0	33.2	33.7	34.2	35.3	36.5	38.2	39.7	41.1	42.3	43.4	44.6
Czechia	Country/Area	32.5	32.2	33.2	33.8	33.6	32.7	32.9	34.1	35.3	36.1	37.5	38.7	39.6	41.4	43.2
Hungary	Country/Area	30.1	30.8	32.2	33.5	34.2	34.4	34.4	35.0	36.4	37.5	38.5	39.1	40.1	41.7	43.3
Poland	Country/Area	25.8	26.0	26.5	27.4	28.1	28.6	29.5	30.7	32.2	33.6	35.0	36.6	38.1	39.7	41.7
Republic of Moldova	Country/Area	26.6	26.6	26.1	26.2	26.3	26.2	27.7	28.7	29.9	30.8	31.3	32.4	34.2	35.6	37.6
Romania	Country/Area	26.3	27.2	28.3	29.9	30.6	30.2	30.4	31.6	32.6	33.9	34.9	37.1	39.4	41.3	43.2
Russian Federation	Country/Area	24.3	26.1	27.2	28.6	30.8	30.8	31.4	32.2	33.4	35.0	36.5	37.3	38.0	38.6	39.6
Slovakia	Country/Area	27.0	27.4	27.6	28.0	28.3	28.4	28.8	30.0	31.2	32.4	33.9	35.4	37.3	39.2	41.2
Ukraine	Country/Area	27.6	28.3	28.9	29.8	32.0	33.3	33.5	34.0	35.3	36.4	37.8	39.1	39.5	40.0	41.2
Northern Europe	Subregion	33.6	33.9	34.4	34.1	33.5	33.4	34.0	35.1	35.6	36.4	37.6	38.7	39.6	40.2	40.8
Channel Islands	Country/Area	35.7	36.1	36.6	36.1	35.2	34.5	34.9	35.8	36.0	36.8	38.2	39.8	41.0	41.6	42.6
Denmark	Country/Area	31.7	32.4	33.0	32.8	32.5	33.0	34.3	36.0	37.1	37.7	38.4	39.6	40.6	41.6	42.3
Estonia	Country/Area	29.9	30.2	32.2	33.0	33.8	34.3	33.9	34.0	34.4	36.4	38.0	39.4	40.2	41.6	42.4
Finland	Country/Area	27.8	28.0	28.4	28.7	29.6	30.8	32.8	34.7	36.4	37.8	39.4	40.9	42.0	42.5	43.1
Iceland	Country/Area	26.5	26.2	25.4	24.2	24.5	25.4	26.9	28.4	30.0	31.5	32.9	34.3	34.8	36.0	37.5
Ireland	Country/Area	30.0	30.2	29.2	27.5	26.4	26.1	26.3	26.9	28.4	30.1	31.8	33.2	34.4	36.5	38.2
Latvia	Country/Area	29.9	30.5	32.3	33.2	34.2	34.9	35.1	34.7	34.7	36.2	37.9	39.5	40.8	42.6	43.9
Lithuania	Country/Area	27.8	28.0	28.5	29.7	30.8	31.5	32.0	32.1	32.7	34.0	35.9	38.5	40.6	42.7	45.1
Norway	Country/Area	32.6	33.6	34.3	34.1	32.9	32.4	33.3	34.6	35.4	36.1	36.9	38.0	38.7	39.2	39.8
Sweden	Country/Area	34.2	35.1	36.0	36.2	35.4	35.4	36.3	37.7	38.4	38.5	39.4	40.3	40.7	40.9	41.1
United Kingdom	Country/Area	34.9	35.1	35.6	35.1	34.2	34.0	34.4	35.4	35.8	36.5	37.6	38.7	39.5	40.0	40.5
Southern Europe	Subregion	27.3	28.4	29.3	30.1	30.8	31.0	31.8	33.0	34.6	36.4	38.3	39.9	41.4	43.5	45.5
Albania	Country/Area	21.2	20.6	20.2	19.7	19.6	20.2	21.4	22.8	24.0	24.6	27.0	29.1	32.2	34.9	36.4
Bosnia and Herzegovina	Country/Area	20.0	20.8	21.8	21.9	22.2	23.4	25.4	27.3	29.8	33.1	35.0	36.9	38.9	40.7	43.1
Kosovo	Country/Area											29.1	30.5	30.2	30.8	30.1
Croatia	Country/Area	27.9	28.2	29.2	30.7	32.1	33.1	33.5	34.3	35.8	37.9	38.9	40.5	41.7	43.1	44.3
Greece	Country/Area	25.5	26.9	28.3	29.9	32.3	32.4	33.0	33.9	35.1	36.5	38.0	39.4	41.1	43.4	45.6
Italy	Country/Area	28.6	30.2	31.4	32.1	32.8	33.3	34.1	35.5	37.0	38.7	40.3	41.9	43.5	45.4	47.3
Malta	Country/Area	23.7	21.9	23.0	24.3	26.9	29.1	31.0	31.6	33.1	35.0	36.5	38.4	40.2	41.1	42.6
Montenegro	Country/Area	21.6	22.2	22.9	23.5	24.1	24.9	26.7	28.3	29.8	32.2	34.4	35.0	36.4	37.7	38.8
North Macedonia	Country/Area	21.8	21.6	21.5	21.7	22.5	24.0	25.9	27.6	29.2	30.7	32.3	34.0	35.7	37.4	39.1
Portugal	Country/Area	26.1	27.3	27.9	28.9	29.6	29.8	30.6	32.1	34.2	36.0	37.8	39.4	41.6	43.9	46.2
Serbia	Country/Area	25.8	26.5	27.9	29.2	30.1	29.9	30.9	32.1	33.2	34.1	36.1	37.2	38.7	40.5	41.6
Slovenia	Country/Area	27.7	28.2	29.2	30.3	31.0	31.4	31.6	32.5	34.2	36.2	38.1	40.1	41.6	43.0	44.5
Spain	Country/Area	27.5	28.6	29.2	30.0	29.8	29.9	30.4	31.6	33.4	35.5	37.6	39.1	40.0	42.5	44.9
Western Europe	Subregion	34.4	33.6	33.7	33.3	33.2	33.7	34.3	35.3	36.3	37.4	38.9	40.6	42.3	43.5	43.9
Austria	Country/Area	35.7	35.1	35.4	34.7	33.6	33.9	35.0	35.8	36.5	36.3	38.2	40.0	41.9	43.2	43.5
Belgium	Country/Area	35.5	34.6	35.1	34.9	34.6	34.3	34.3	35.3	36.5	37.6	39.0	40.3	40.9	41.3	41.9
France	Country/Area	34.5	32.9	33.0	32.7	32.4	31.6	32.4	33.6	34.8	36.2	37.7	38.9	40.1	41.2	42.3
Germany	Country/Area	35.2	34.5	34.7	34.3	34.2	35.4	36.5	37.2	37.6	38.4	40.1	42.1	44.3	45.9	45.7
Luxembourg	Country/Area	35.0	35.7	35.2	35.3	35.4	35.0	35.0	35.8	36.4	36.7	37.3	38.5	38.9	39.3	39.7
Netherlands	Country/Area	28.0	28.5	28.6	28.5	28.6	29.4	31.3	33.1	34.6	36.0	37.5	39.0	40.8	42.1	43.3
Switzerland	Country/Area	33.2	33.0	32.7	31.5	31.8	32.9	34.6	36.0	36.9	37.2	38.6	40.0	41.6	42.2	43.1
NORTHERN AMERICA	SDG subregion	30.0	30.1	29.4	28.3	28.2	28.8	29.9	31.4	32.9	34.1	35.4	36.4	37.2	37.9	38.6
Canada	Country/Area	27.7	27.3	26.5	25.5	26.1	27.5	29.2	31.0	32.9	34.8	36.8	38.6	39.6	40.4	41.1
United States of America	Country/Area	30.2	30.3	29.7	28.6	28.4	29.0	30.0	31.4	32.8	34.0	35.2	36.1	36.9	37.6	38.3

== See also ==
- Population pyramid
- List of U.S. states and territories by median age
