= Djavad Salehi-Isfahani =

American economist

Djavad Salehi-Isfahani (Persian: جواد صالحی اصفهانی) is a professor of economics at Virginia Tech, and a visiting fellow at the Middle East Youth Initiative at the Wolfensohn Center for Development housed in the Global Economy and Development program at the Brookings Institution. His expertise and research focus is in economics, demographic economics, energy economics, and the economics of Iran and of the larger Middle East.

Salehi-Isfahani served as Assistant Professor of Economics at the University of Pennsylvania and was a visiting professor at the University of Oxford. He has been a research fellow with the Economic Research Forum, a regional association of Middle Eastern economists based in Cairo, since 1993, and served on their Board of Trustees between 2001 and 2006. He additionally serves on the board of the Middle East Economic Association

Salehi-Isfahani holds a BSc from the University of London, Queen Mary College and a Ph.D. in economics from Harvard University. His articles have appeared in the Journal of Development Economics, International Journal of Middle East Studies, Iranian Studies, Economic Development and Cultural Change, The Economic Journal, and the Journal of Economic Inequality, among others.

== Selected bibliography ==
- Models of the Oil Market (1991) ISBN 3-7186-5072-X
- The Production and Diffusion of Public Choice Political Economy: Reflections of the VPI (2004) ISBN 1-4051-2453-9
- Labor and Human Capital in the Middle East: Studies of Markets and Household Behavior (2001) ISBN 0-86372-295-4
- Government subsidies and demand for petroleum products in Iran (WPM) (1996) ISBN 0-948061-95-2 download
