= Middle East Youth Initiative =

American nonprofit (2006–2012)

- Established: July 2006 (19 years ago)
- Founders: Wolfensohn Center for Development, Mohammed bin Rashid School of Government
- Dissolved: 2012
- Types: research institute
- Headquarters: Washington, D.C.
- Country: United States

The Middle East Youth Initiative is a program at the Wolfensohn Center for Development, housed in the Global Economy and Development program at the Brookings Institution. It was launched in July 2006 as a joint effort between the Wolfensohn Center and the Dubai School of Government.

The Initiative performs vigorous research on issues pertaining to regional youth (ages 15–24) on the topics of Youth Exclusion, education, employment, marriage, housing, and credit, and on the ways in which all of these elements are linked during young people’s experience of waithood. In addition to research and policy recommendation, the Initiative serves as a hub for networking between policymakers, regional actors in development, government officials, representatives from the private sector, and youth.

Current fellows with the Initiative include Djavad Salehi-Isfahani.
