= List of Rice University people =

The list of Rice University people includes notable alumni, former students, faculty, and presidents of Rice University.

== Alumni ==
The names of Distinguished Alumni Award recipients are available online (the list is arranged alphabetically and includes recipients of other Rice University awards).

Selected Rice alumni

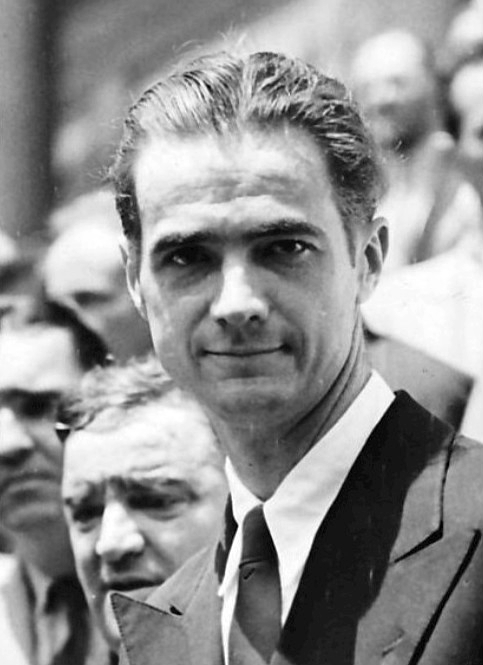
Howard Hughes, former aviator, engineer, industrialist, film producer and director

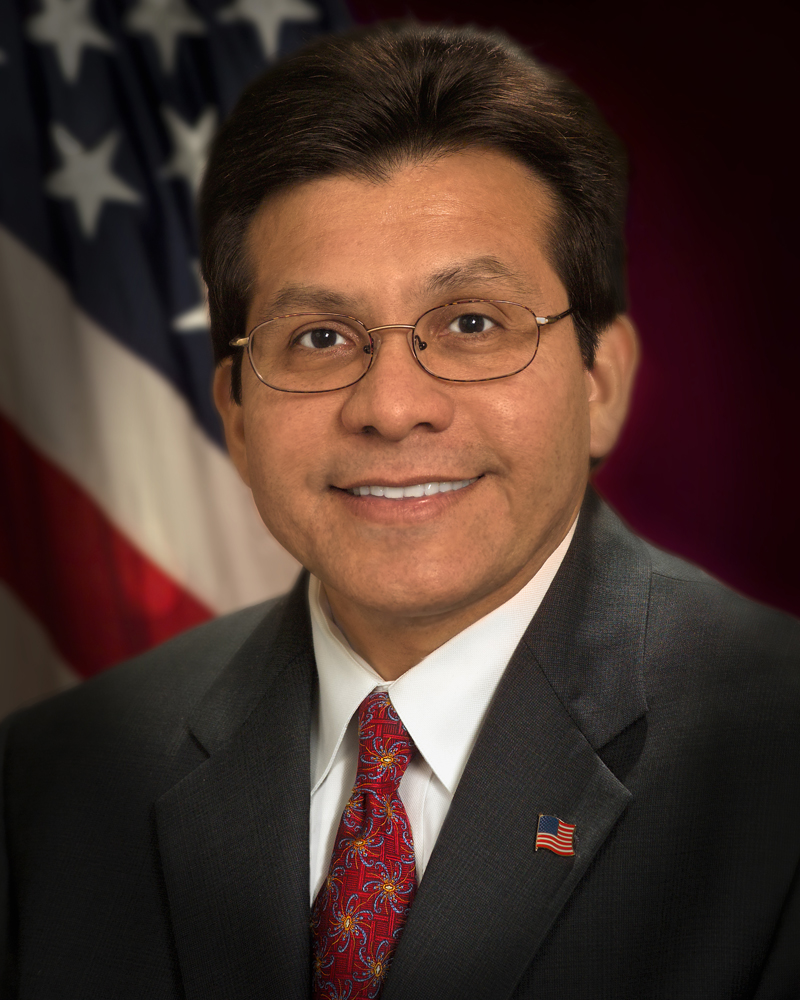
Alberto Gonzales, former U.S. attorney general

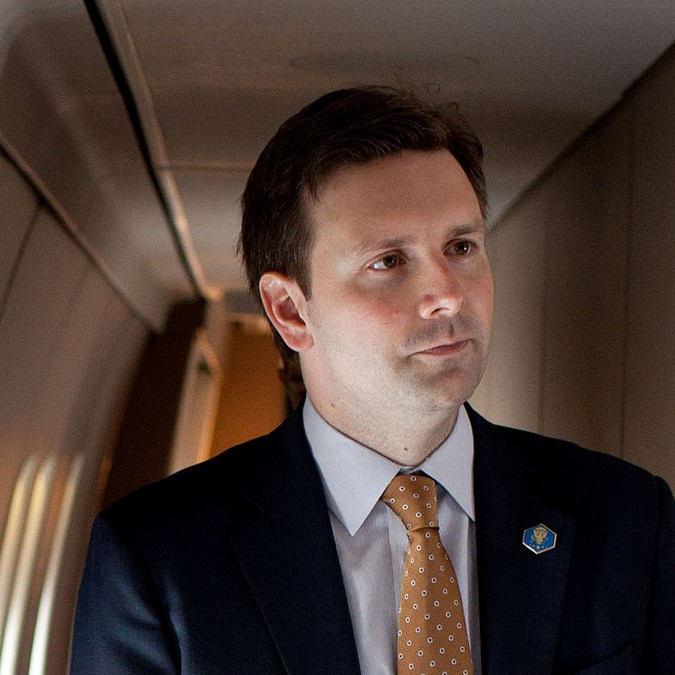
Josh Earnest, former White House press secretary

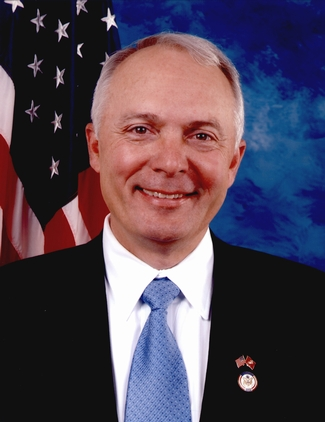
John Kline, U.S. congressman

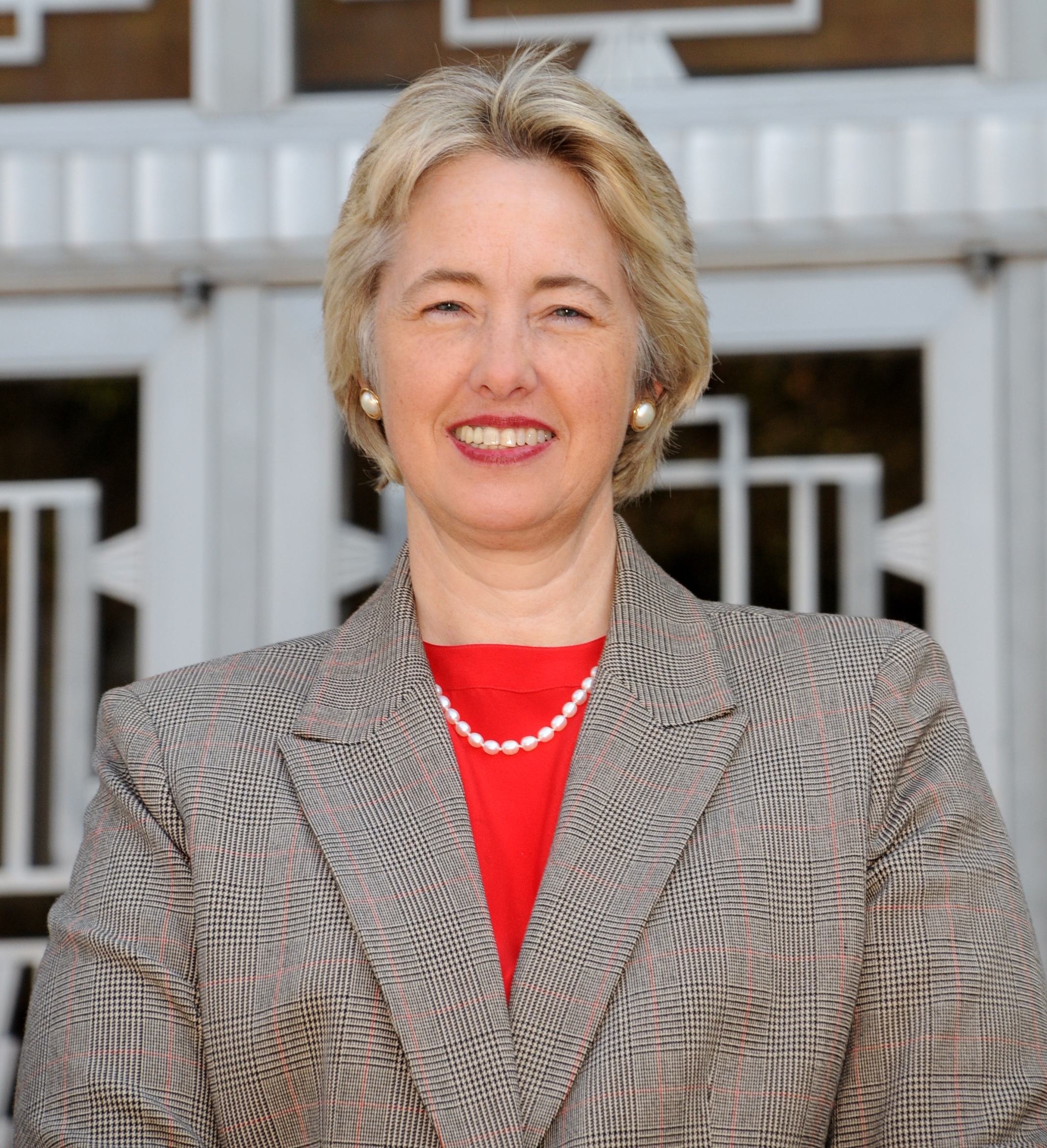
Annise Parker, 61st mayor of Houston

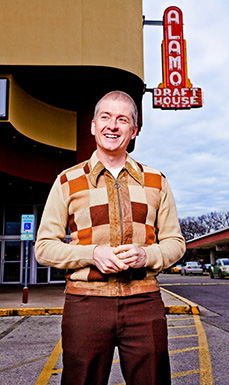
Tim League, founder of Alamo Drafthouse Cinema

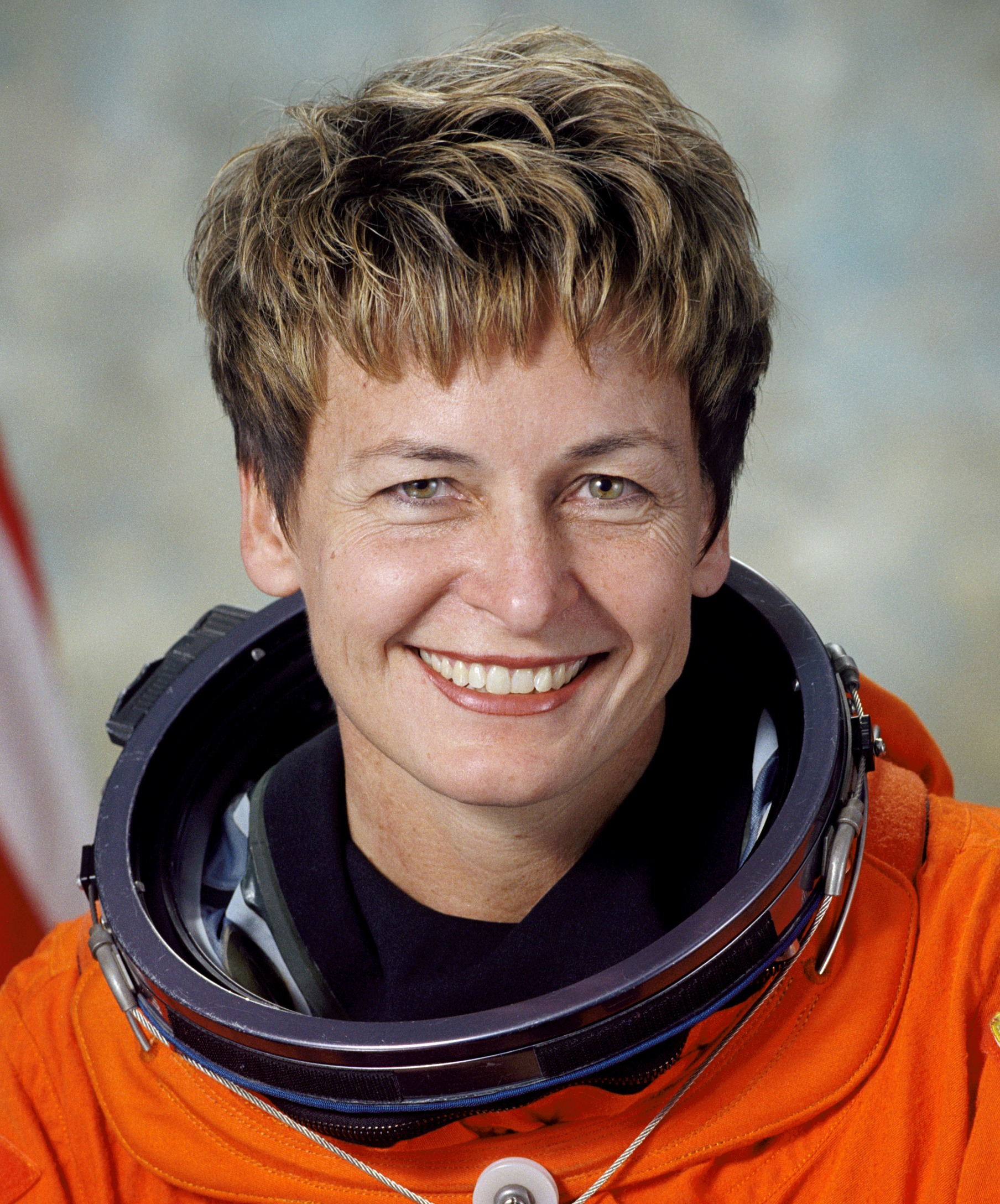
Peggy Whitson, NASA astronaut

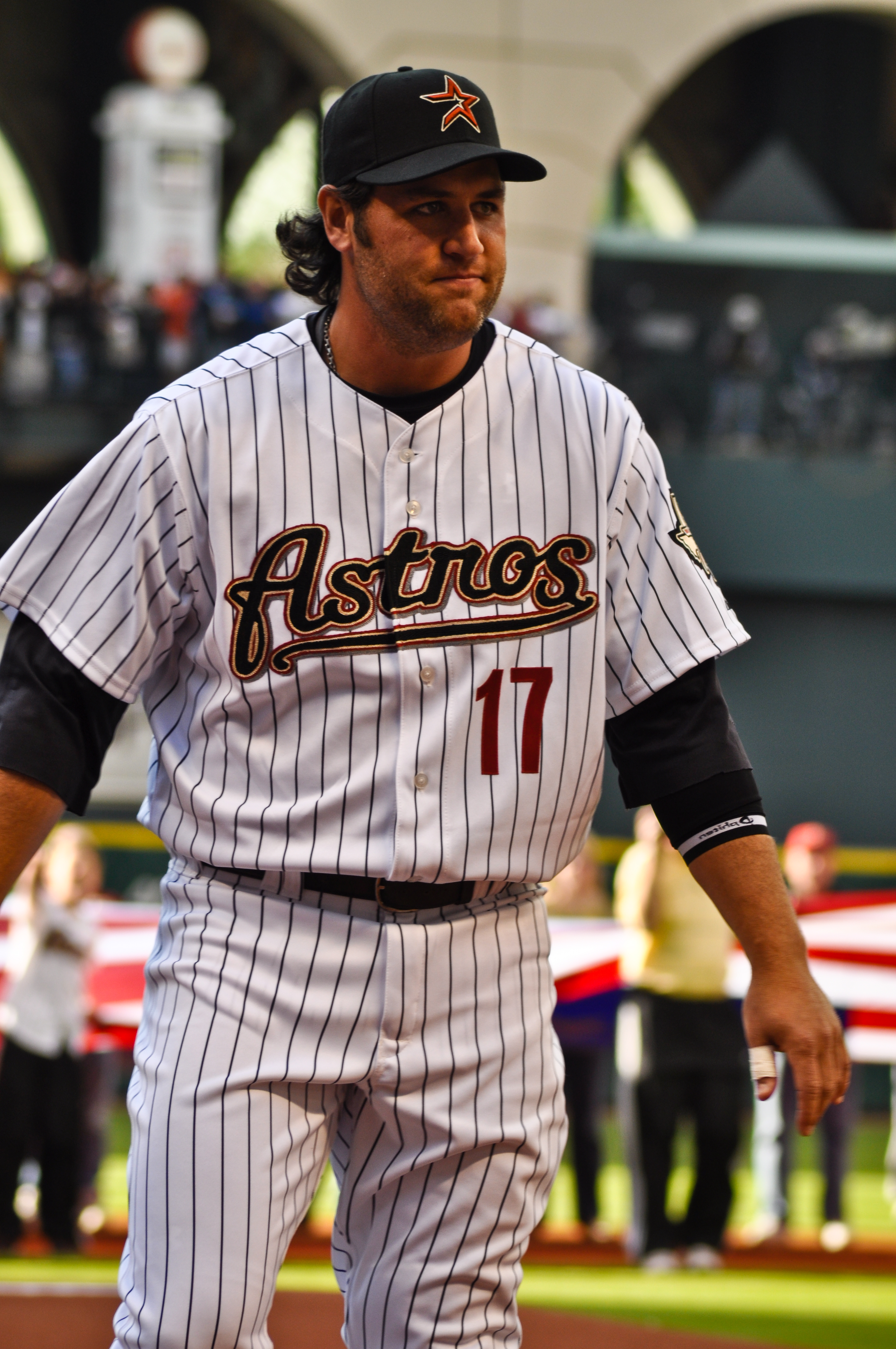
Lance Berkman, MLB player

=== Government and politics ===
Note: individuals who belong in multiple sections appear in the most relevant section.

==== U.S. cabinet secretaries ====
- Charles Duncan, 1947, U.S. secretary of energy (1979–1981)
- Alberto Gonzales, 1979, United States attorney general (2005–2007)

==== U.S. ambassadors ====
- James Ward Hargrove, 1943, ambassador to Australia (1976–1977)
- Eric Nelson, 1983, ambassador to Bosnia and Herzegovina (2019–2022)

==== Other federal officials ====
- Patrick G. Carrick, member of the Senior Executive Service
- Robert L. Clarke, 1963, attorney, comptroller of the Currency (1985–1992)
- Josh Earnest, 1997, White House press secretary for President Barack Obama (2014–2017)
- L. Patrick Gray (attended), acting director of the Federal Bureau of Investigation (1972–1973)
- Stephen Hahn, 1980, commissioner of the Food and Drug Administration (2019–2021)
- Robert S. Martin, 1971, director, Institute of Museum and Library Services (2001–2005)
- Benjamin J. Rhodes, 2000, speechwriter and national security adviser to Barack Obama

==== U.S. senators and congressmen ====
- Bill Archer (attended), United States congressman (1971–2001)
- Jim Bridenstine, 1998, U.S. representative, Oklahoma's 1st congressional district (2013–2018); administrator of NASA (2018–2021)
- John Kline, 1969, United States congressman (2003–2017)
- Pete Olson, 1985, United States congressman (2009–2021)
- Albert Thomas, 1920, U.S. representative, Texas's 8th congressional district (1937–1966)

==== Governors ====
- James V. Allred (attended), governor of Texas (1935–1939)
- Glenn Youngkin, 1990, governor of Virginia (2022–2026)

==== Mayors ====
- George Chang, Ph.D. 1966, mayor of Tainan, Taiwan (1997–2001)
- Roy Hofheinz, 1932 (attended), mayor of the City of Houston (1953–1955)
- Annise Parker, 1978, mayor of the City of Houston (2010–2016)
- Starke Taylor, 1943, mayor of the City of Dallas (1983–1987)

==== State and local officials ====
- George P. Bush, 1998, commissioner of the Texas General Land Office; son of Florida Governor Jeb Bush; nephew of former President George W. Bush; grandson of former President George H. W. Bush
- Eric Dick, 2022, president of the Harris County Department of Education since 2017; lawyer specializing in denied or underpaid property insurance claims
- William P. Hobby Jr., 1953, lieutenant governor of Texas (1973–1991); former chancellor of the University of Houston System; former president and executive editor of The Houston Post
- Scott Hochberg, member of the Texas House of Representatives
- M. J. Khan, Master of Business Administration, former Houston City Council member
- Eliot Shapleigh, 1974, Texas state senator

==== Judges ====
- Lamar John Ryan Cecil, 1923, United States district judge of the United States District Court for the Eastern District of Texas (1954–1958)
- Finis E. Cowan, 1951, United States district judge of the United States District Court for the Southern District of Texas (1977–1979)
- Harold R. DeMoss Jr., 1952, federal judge on the United States Court of Appeals for the Fifth Circuit (1991–2015)
- Hugh Gibson, 1940, United States district judge of the United States District Court for the Southern District of Texas (1979–1998)
- Sam E. Haddon, 1959, United States district judge of the United States District Court for the District of Montana (2012–present)
- Sharon Keller, 1975, presiding judge of the Texas Court of Criminal Appeals (2001–present)
- James Aubrey Parker, 1959, senior judge of the United States District Court for the District of New Mexico (2003–present)
- Karen Gren Scholer, 1979, United States district judge of the United States District Court for the Northern District of Texas (2018–present)
- Anuraag Singhal, 1986, United States district judge of the United States District Court for the Southern District of Florida (2019–present)
- Leslie H. Southwick, 1972, federal judge on the 5th U.S. Circuit Court of Appeals
- James P. Sullivan, 2003, justice on the Supreme Court of Texas

==== Other ====
- Robert L. Leuschner Jr., 1957, graduated as a chemical engineer, but after joining the NROTC at Rice, pursued a distinguished career in the U.S. Navy, attaining the rank of rear admiral
- Mitch Bainwol, 1983, former chair, Republican National Committee
- William Luther Pierce, 1955, National Alliance founder, noted neo-Nazi, and author of the Turner Diaries
- Gary H. Stern, chief executive of the Ninth Federal Reserve Bank at Minneapolis

=== Arts and letters ===
==== Architecture ====
- Ralph A. Anderson Jr., 1943, architect
- Arthur E. Jones, 1947, architect
- E. Fay Jones, March 1951, architect, named in 2000 by the American Institute of Architects as "one of the ten most influential architects of the twentieth century"
- Eric Kuhne, 1973, British architect
- Charles Renfro, BArch 1989, architect, partner of Diller Scofidio + Renfro
- Blaine E. Brownell, MArch 1998, architect, director of the School of Architecture at the University of North Carolina at Charlotte, and columnist for Architect Magazine
- Kevin Daly, MArch, founder of Kevin Daly Architects and adjunct professor at UCLA

==== Fashion ====
- James Mischka, 1985, designer and co-founder of Badgley Mischka

==== Film, television and radio ====
- Elizabeth Avellán, 1992, film producer and co-founder of Troublemaker Studios
- Ron Bozman, 1969, Academy Award-winning film producer (The Silence of the Lambs)
- Dr. Joy Browne (b. Oppenheim), Jones 1966, host of popular syndicated radio and television call-in therapy shows
- John William Corrington, M.A. 1960, screenwriter
- James Craig, actor (Kitty Foyle)
- Germaine Franco, 1984, film composer (Coco)
- Amy Hobby, 1986, Academy Award-nominated producer
- Howard Hughes (attended), filmmaker known for Hell's Angel's (1930) and Scarface (1932); life and career served as the basis for the 2004 film The Aviator
- Tim League, 1992, founder of Alamo Drafthouse Cinema, a high end theatre chain, and Drafthouse Films, film distributor
- Mike MacRae, 1999, voice actor, comedian
- Warren Skaaren, 1969, executive director of Texas Film Commission and screenwriter of Top Gun, Beetlejuice, Beverly Hills Cop II, Batman
- Gus Sorola (attended), Machinima artist and founding member of Rooster Teeth

==== History and journalism ====
- William Broyles Jr., 1966, founder of Texas Monthly; former editor in chief at Newsweek; screenwriter of Apollo 13, Cast Away, Unfaithful, Flags of Our Fathers
- Gwynne Dyer, M.A. 1966, journalist, syndicated columnist and military historian; Senior Lecturer in War Studies at the Royal Military Academy Sandhurst (1973–1977)
- John Graves, 1942, nature writer, Goodbye to a River
- Jo Ling Kent, 2006, NBC News correspondent
- Zack Kopplin, 2015, political activist, journalist, and television personality who came to fame during high school for publicly campaigning against the Louisiana Science Education Act, a creationism law; investigator for the Government Accountability Project
- Evan Mintz, B.A. 2008, 2017 Pulitzer finalist in editorial writing, Opinion and Community Engagement editor for the Houston Chronicle
- Steve Sailer, 1980, writer for Taki's Magazine and VDARE
- Rosa Levin Toubin, Jewish Texan historian, civic leader and philanthropist
- Garrett L. Washington, historian of 19th- and 20th-century Japan
- Lamar White, 2005, investigative journalist known for his work on racism and political corruption in the Deep South

==== Literature ====
- June Arnold, B.A. 1948, M.A. 1958, novelist and feminist activist
- Candace Bushnell (attended), author of Sex and the City
- Elisa Gabbert, B.A. 2002, poet, essayist, and The New York Times poetry columnist
- William Goyen, B.A. 1937, M.A. 1939, novelist and editor
- Eva Hoffman, 1967, author, Lost in Translation, Shtetl: The Life and Death of a Small Town and the World of Polish Jews, The Secret: A Novel, After Such Knowledge
- John Irwin, M.A., Ph.D., poet, author, professor at Johns Hopkins University, former editor of The Georgia Review, and namesake of annual United States Chess Federation national senior tournament
- Larry McMurtry, M.A. 1960, Pulitzer Prize-winning author, known for Lonesome Dove, The Last Picture Show, and Terms of Endearment; won Oscar for Brokeback Mountain screenplay
- Elizabeth Moon, 1968, author, The Deed of Paksenarrion, Winning Colors
- Joyce Carol Oates (attended), author; Princeton creative writing professor; dropped out of English PhD program after publishing in Best American Short Stories
- Cecily Parks, B.A. 1999, Pushcart Prize-winning poet and Texas State University MFA professor
- John Pipkin, PhD 1997, novelist
- Adriana E. Ramírez, B.A. 2005, writer, critic-at-large for the Los Angeles Times, and co-founder of the literary journal Aster(ix)
- Charles Harper Webb, B.A., Whiting Award-winning poet and professor at California State University, Long Beach

==== Music ====
- Lola Astanova, master's 2005, summa cum laude, Russian-born classical pianist
- Rebecca Carrington, master's in Music, British "music comedian"
- Carl P. Daw Jr., Episcopalian priest; director of the Hymn Society in the United States and Canada; researcher and authority on sacred music
- Gabriela Frank (born 1972), pianist and composer of contemporary classical music
- Hilary Purrington, 2013, composer
- Caroline Shaw, 2004, Pulitzer Prize-winning musician
- Kate Soper, 2003, Pulitzer Prize-finalist musician

==== Visual art ====
- Mark Flood, 1981, contemporary artist
- Robert S. Martin, 1971, librarian; member of National Council for the Humanities; former director of Institute of Museum & Library Services; 2008 recipient of Presidential Citizens Medal
- Charles L. Venable, 1982, curator and former director of the Indianapolis Museum of Art and the Speed Art Museum
- Wayne Gilbert, MA 2012, painter and gallerist
- Ann Harithas, MFA, artist, curator, and founder of multiple museums in Texas, including the Art Car Museum, Station Museum of Contemporary Art, and Five Points Museum of Contemporary Art

=== Business ===
- Brian Armstrong, 2005 and 2006, founder and CEO of Coinbase
- Manolo Betancur, baker and immigrant rights activist
- George R. Brown, 1920, founder of Brown and Root, one of the world's largest construction firms
- Thomas H. Cruikshank, former chairman and CEO of Halliburton
- Mark Dankberg, 1976, co-founder and CEO, ViaSat
- L. John Doerr, 1973, venture capitalist at Kleiner, Perkins, Caufield & Byers; CEO of Silicon Compilers; co-founder of the @Home Network; on the board of directors of Intuit, Amazon.com, PalmOne, Sun Microsystems, Google, and Segway
- Charles Duncan, 1947, former president, Coca-Cola; former secretary of energy under Jimmy Carter (1979–1981)
- Mark Durcan, 1984, CEO of Micron Technology
- Lynn Elsenhans, chairman and CEO of Sunoco
- Kevin Harvey, 1987, founding member and general partner at Benchmark, a Silicon Valley venture capital firm
- Howard Hughes (attended), richest man in the world in 1976
- Steve Jackson, 1974, founder of Steve Jackson Games
- Ken Kennedy, 1967, founder of Center for Research on Parallel Computation, the High Performance Fortran Forum; co-chair of the President's Information Technology Advisory Committee with Bill Joy of Sun Microsystems
- Ali Yıldırım Koç, 1990, Koç Holding member; 37th president of Turkish multisport club Fenerbahçe S.K.
- Fred C. Koch (attended), founder of Koch Industries, one of the largest private companies in the United States
- James E. Lyon, Houston developer and Republican politician
- Cal McNair, 1995, chairman and CEO of the Houston Texans NFL franchise
- Arun Netravali, 1969 and 1971, pioneer of digital technology including HDTV; former president of Bell Laboratories and Chief Scientist for Lucent Technologies
- David Rhodes, 1996, president of CBS News; former head of U.S. television for Bloomberg
- Hector Ruiz, 1972, president and CEO of AMD
- James Treybig, 1963 and 1964, founder of Tandem Computers
- Jim Turley, 1977 and 1978, chairman and CEO of Ernst & Young
- Jim Whitehurst, 1989, president and CEO of Red Hat
- Glenn Youngkin, 1990, former co-CEO of The Carlyle Group

=== Science and technology ===
==== Astronauts ====
- Nichole Ayers, 2021, NASA astronaut candidate for NASA Astronaut Group 23
- John S. Bull, 1957, BS in mechanical engineering, NASA astronaut
- Takao Doi, PhD 2004, NASA astronaut
- Jeffrey A. Hoffman, master's in materials science, 1988, NASA astronaut
- Tamara E. Jernigan, PhD 1988, NASA astronaut
- James H. Newman, 1982 and 1984, NASA astronaut
- John D. Olivas, PhD 1996, NASA astronaut
- Janice Voss, graduate work in Space Physics 1977–1978, NASA astronaut
- Shannon Walker, Baker 1987, MA 1992, PhD 1993, NASA astronaut
- Peggy Whitson, PhD 1986 NASA astronaut

==== NASA flight directors ====
- Kwatsi Alibaruho MBA 2011, first African-American flight director in NASA history and the lead flight director for the last space shuttle mission
- Wayne Hale, Hanszen 1976, mechanical engineering, Space Shuttle Flight Director for 40 missions between 1988 and 2003

==== Nobel laureates ====
- Louis E. Brus, 1965, co-discoverer of quantum dots
- Robert F. Curl Jr., 1954, co-discoverer of fullerenes
- Robert Woodrow Wilson, 1957, co-discoverer of cosmic microwave background radiation

==== Other sciences ====
- Jay Bailey, BA 1966, PhD 1969, pioneer of biochemical engineering
- Andrew Dessler, Lovett 1986 climate change meteorologist
- Mark Durcan, 1979–1984, Master of Chemical Engineering and a BS chemical engineering, chief executive officer at Micron Technology
- David Eagleman, 1993, neuroscientist at Stanford University and author of Sum: Forty Tales from the Afterlives
- Wanda Gass, 1978, electrical engineer who helped develop the first commercially viable digital signal processor at Texas Instruments
- James E. Gunn, Baker 1961, astronomer at Princeton University, 1977 National Academy of Sciences 2009 recipient of the National Medal of Science
- Dave Hyatt, Baker 1994, browser developer at Netscape and Apple
- He Jiankui, PhD 2010, widely condemned geneticist who claimed to have created the world's first genome edited babies, Nana and Lulu
- Howard Johnson, PhD 1982, electrical engineer
- Riki Kobayashi, 1943, B.S., chemical engineering
- Larry Lake, PhD 1973, petroleum engineer and member of the National Academy of Engineering
- Amy Leventer, 1988, Ph.D., geology, marine biologist, micropaleontologist, Antarctic researcher
- Frank L. Lewis, 1971, MEE
- George Whitelaw Mackey, 1938, mathematician, 1962 National Academy of Sciences
- Diana McSherry, 1967, M.A., 1969, Ph.D., computer scientist, biophysicist
- Jack Morava, 1968, mathematician
- John Morgan, 1968, mathematician, 2013 National Academy of Sciences
- Harold E. Rorschach Jr., professor of physics at Rice (1952–1993), was the chairman of the physics department three times and principal investigator of the NASA interdisciplinary laboratory at Rice
- Noah Rosenberg, 1997, geneticist working in evolutionary biology, mathematical phylogenetics, and population genetics, and the Stanford Professor of Population Genetics and Society
- Steven Schafersman, 1983 PhD in geology, president of Texas Citizens for Science
- Dorry Segev, Israeli-born Marjory K. and Thomas Pozefsky Professor of Surgery at Johns Hopkins University School of Medicine, professor of Epidemiology at Johns Hopkins Bloomberg School of Public Health, and associate vice chair of the Department of Surgery at Johns Hopkins Hospital
- Fred I. Stalkup, 1957 BS in chemical engineering, 1961 Ph.D. chemical engineering noted for work in enhanced oil recovery, member of the National Academy of Engineering
- Dennis Sullivan, 1963 BA in mathematics, mathematician at Stony Brook University and CUNY grad school; recipient of the 2004 National Medal of Science; 2010 Wolf Prize in Mathematics; 2022 Abel Prize
- Powtawche Valerino, PhD 2005, mechanical engineer at the NASA Jet Propulsion Laboratory who worked on the Cassini mission

=== Academia ===
- Daniel Albright, 1967, Harvard University English professor
- Walter L. Buenger, Ph.D. 1979, historian at Texas A&M University
- John R. Carpenter, geochemist (attended)
- Nancy Cole, 1964, educational psychologist
- Cristle Collins Judd, B.M./M.M. 1983, 11th president of Sarah Lawrence College
- Gwynne Dyer, 1973–1977, senior Lecturer in War Studies at the Royal Military Academy Sandhurst
- Nikta Fakhri, PhD 2011, professor of Physics at Massachusetts Institute of Technology
- Shriram Krishnamurthi, PhD 2000, professor of computer science at Brown University and developer of the Racket programming language
- R. Bowen Loftin, Ph.D. 1975, 22nd chancellor of the University of Missouri, and 24th president of Texas A&M University.
- Bennett McCallum, B.A. 1957, B.S. 1958, Ph.D. 1969, monetary economist and professor at the Tepper School of Business
- Kannan Moudgalya, PhD 1985, professor of Chemical Engineering at IITB
- Amos Rapoport, 1957, professor, psychologist, architect and one of the founders of Environment-Behavior Studies
- Robert K. Ritner, 1975, Egyptologist at the University of Chicago
- Roland W. Schmitt, Ph.D. 1951, president of Rensselaer Polytechnic Institute (1988–1993)
- William Sidis (1898–1944), child prodigy with exceptional mathematical and linguistic skills, for which he was active as a mathematician, linguist, historian, author, researcher, and student and teacher at Rice
- Namita Gupta Wiggers, 1989, expert in the field of contemporary craft, curator, educator and writer

=== Religion ===
- The Rt. Rev. Scott Field Bailey, 1938, bishop of the Episcopal Diocese of West Texas
- The Rev. Carl P. Daw Jr., Will Rice 1966, executive director of the Hymn Society in the United States and Canada
- The Rt. Rev. Claude Edward Payne, 1954, 1955, bishop of the Episcopal Diocese of Texas
- The Rt. Rev. Steven Tighe, 1978, bishop of the Anglican Diocese of the Southwest

=== Sports ===
==== Baseball ====
- David Aardsma, 2003, MLB pitcher, 22nd overall pick of the San Francisco Giants
- Lance Berkman, 1997, six-time All-Star Major League baseball player for the Houston Astros
- Norm Charlton, 1984, Major League Baseball player
- Bubba Crosby, 1998, Major League Baseball player for the New York Yankees
- José Cruz Jr., 1993, Major League Baseball player
- Tyler Duffey, Major League Baseball player for the Minnesota Twins
- Brock Holt, 2009, Major League Baseball utility player for the Boston Red Sox
- Philip Humber, 2004, Major League Baseball player, 3rd overall pick of the New York Mets; pitched a perfect game in 2012
- Evan Kravetz, 2019, Major League Baseball pitcher for the Cincinnati Reds
- Jeff Niemann, 2004, Major League Baseball pitcher, 4th overall pick of the Tampa Bay Devil Rays
- Anthony Rendon, 2011, Major League Baseball first-round draft choice of the Washington Nationals

==== Basketball ====
- Morris Almond, 2007, NBA guard, 25th overall pick of the Utah Jazz
- Suleiman Braimoh (born 1989), Nigerian-American basketball player in the Israel Basketball Premier League
- Egor Koulechov (born 1994), Israeli-Russian professional basketball player for Israeli team Ironi Nahariya
- Ricky Pierce, 1983, NBA guard, 1983–1998; NBA All-Star 1991; NBA Sixth Man of the Year Award 1987 and 1990
- Mike Wilks, 2001, NBA guard 2002–09

==== Football ====
- Tony Barker, 1992, former NFL player for the Washington Redskins
- Chris Boswell, NFL placekicker, Pittsburgh Steelers
- O.J. Brigance, 1991, former NFL player
- James Casey, NFL tight end/fullback for the Houston Texans
- Patrick Dendy, NFL player, Green Bay Packers
- Buddy Dial, end, College Football Hall of Fame inductee 1993, All-Pro 1961, 1963
- Jarett Dillard, 2008, Jacksonville Jaguars wide receiver
- Michael Downs, 1981, NFL All-Pro safety, Dallas Cowboys
- Emmanuel Ellerbee, 2018, NFL linebacker for the Atlanta Falcons
- Jack Fox, 2019, NFL punter for the Detroit Lions
- Courtney Hall, 1989, NFL offensive lineman, 1989 2nd round draft pick of the San Diego Chargers
- King Hill, quarterback, top pick in first round of 1958 NFL draft
- Billy Howton, NFL's former all-time receiving leader, Green Bay Packers and Dallas Cowboys
- Weldon Humble, guard, College Football Hall of Fame Inductee, 1961
- Larry Izzo, 3-time Pro Bowl LB/special teams captain for the New England Patriots, Super Bowl Champions 2002, 2004, 2005
- N.D. Kalu, NFL defensive end for the Houston Texans
- Tommy Kramer, NFL quarterback, named to Pro Bowl while playing for the Minnesota Vikings
- Don Maynard, wide receiver, Pro Football Hall of Fame inductee
- Will McClay, coach of the Dallas Desperados, an Arena Football League team
- Vance McDonald, 2013, NFL tight end
- Dicky Moegle, 1954, halfback, inducted into Cotton Bowl Classic Hall of Fame in 1998; College Football Hall of Fame Inductee, 1979
- Cheta Ozougwu, defensive end for Chicago Bears, 2011 Mr. Irrelevant
- Tobin Rote, quarterback of 1957 NFL Champion Detroit Lions and 1963 AFL Champion San Diego Chargers
- Frank Beall Ryan, 1958, PhD 1965, NFL quarterback; textbook author; Yale athletic director; appeared on cover of Sports Illustrated, January 4, 1965
- Andrew Sendejo, 2010, NFL safety
- James Williams, end and kicker
- Luke Willson, 2013, NFL tight end

==== Tennis ====
- Sam Match (1923–2010), tennis player; won the NCAA doubles championship with Rice University in 1947
- Harold Solomon (born 1952), professional tennis player ranked as high as number 5 in the world

==== Track and field ====
- Andrea Blackett, 1997, Barbados Olympic hurdler and 1998 Commonwealth Games 400 m hurdles champion
- Jason Colwick, 2010, two-time NCAA champion in pole vault
- Fred Hansen, 1963, NCAA champion in pole vault, gold medalist at 1964 Summer Olympics, world record holder
- Dave Roberts, 1974, bronze medalist in pole vault at 1976 Summer Olympics, and former world record holder (twice) in pole vault
- Sean Wade, Master Runner of the Year; coach of the cross country team at The Kinkaid School

==== Other ====
- Adi Bichman, 2001, Israeli freestyle and medley swimmer
- Sam McGuffie, 2013, member of the 2018 U.S. Olympic men's bobsleigh team as a push crewman for the four man bobsled and brakeman for the two-man bobsled

=== Miscellaneous ===
- Bill Arhos, KLRU station manager, program director; Austin City Limits executive producer
- John Bradshaw, author and motivational speaker
- Amanda Goad, Scripps National Spelling Bee champion
- Harris Masterson III, National Medal of Arts recipient

== Faculty and staff ==
=== Nobel laureates ===
- Robert F. Curl Jr. (also an alumnus of Rice), professor of chemistry, awarded 1996 in chemistry for the discovery of fullerenes
- Hermann Joseph Muller, professor of biology, awarded 1946 in physiology or medicine for the discovery for X-ray mutagenesis
- Roger Penrose, former Rice University’s Edgar Odell Lovett Professor of Mathematics, awarded 2020 in physics for the discovery that black hole formation is a robust prediction of the general theory of relativity
- Richard Smalley, professor of chemistry, awarded 1996 in chemistry for the discovery of fullerenes
- Robert Woodrow Wilson, senior scientist, Harvard-Smithsonian Center for Astrophysics; awarded 1978 in physics for the discovery of cosmic microwave background radiation

=== Other faculty ===
- Shmuel Agmon, Israeli mathematician
- Max Apple, short story writer, novelist, and professor
- Atar Arad, Israeli-American violist, professor of music, essayist, and composer
- Hanan Ashrawi, Palestinian scholar and activist
- Richard Baraniuk, professor of Electrical and Computer Engineering
- Tani E. Barlow, feminist scholar
- Earl Black, political science professor
- Solomon Bochner, mathematician
- Elias Bongmba, professor of Religious Studies
- Douglas Brinkley, award-winning historian
- Baruch Brody, bioethicist
- Bun B (guest lecturer), rapper
- C. Sidney Burrus, electrical engineer
- B. Jill Carroll, former professor of Religious Studies
- Suchan Chae, Korean politician and economics professor
- Franklin Chang-Diaz, former NASA astronaut
- Justin Cronin, author and professor of English
- Rajdeep Dasgupta, professor of Planetary Studies
- Gerald R. Dickens, professor of Earth Science
- Edward Djerejian, diplomat
- Jack Dongarra, 2021 Turing Award Winner and Adjunct Professor of Computer Science
- Elaine Howard Ecklund, professor of Sociology
- Eilaf Egap, assistant professor of Materials Science
- Paul Ellison, bass musician
- Mark Embree, mathematician
- Matthias Felleisen, former professor of computer science who co-invented A-normal form and led the development of the Racket programming language
- Ariel Fernandez, physical chemist
- Naomi Halas, professor of biochemical engineering, chemistry and physics
- Mauro Hamza (born 1965 or 1966), Egyptian fencing coach banned from fencing in the U.S.
- Mikki Hebl, professor of psychology and management
- Julian Huxley, English evolutionary biologist
- Ken Kennedy, computer scientist
- Anne C. Klein, professor of Religious Studies and Buddhist scholar
- Stephen Klineberg, demographics expert and sociologist
- Riki Kobayashi, chemical engineer
- Jeffrey Kurtzman, pianist and musicologist
- Sydney Lamb, linguist
- Neal Lane, physicist and former director of the National Science Foundation
- Robert Lewis, actor, director and co-founder of the Actors Studio
- Qilin Li, Chinese environmental engineer
- Cho-Liang Lin, violinist and soloist
- D. Michael Lindsay, sociologist
- Sergiu Luca, Romanian-born American violinist
- Andreas Luttge, professor of Earth Science and Chemistry
- Szolem Mandelbrojt, Polish-French mathematician
- George Marcus, anthropologist
- Leonard Marsak, scholar of Modern European History
- Angel A. Martí, nanoscience and biophysical inorganic chemist and academic
- Guy T. McBride, chemical engineer
- Brian O'Brien, Australian space scientist
- Lori L. Pollock, computer scientist
- David C. Queller, evolutionary biologist
- Ka Yiu San, bioengineer
- Ann Saterbak, professor of biomedical engineering
- Michel Sebastiani, Olympic fencing coach and member of the US Fencing Association Hall of Fame
- Scott Sonenshein, organizational psychologist
- Monroe K. Spears (1916–1998), Libbie Shearn Moody Professor of English at Rice University 1964–1986
- Robert M. Stein, political scientist
- Robert B. Stobaugh, economics writer
- Yizhi Jane Tao, biochemist
- Richard Tapia, mathematician and winner of the National Medal of Science
- James Tour, chemist and nanotechnologist
- Radoslav Andrea Tsanoff, assistant professor of philosophy in 1914
- Frank Vandiver, American Civil War historian and university president
- Moshe Vardi, Israeli mathematician and computer scientist
- William F. Walker, engineer and university president
- Martin Wiener, historian
- Lora Wildenthal, historian
- Peter Wolynes, professor of chemistry
- Susan Wood, poet and professor of English
- Harvey Yunis, classicist
- Stephen A. Zeff, accounting historian

=== Staff ===
- John Heisman, for whom the coveted Heisman Trophy is named; football coach, 1924–1927, College Football Hall of Fame inductee, 1954
- Jess Neely, football coach 1940–1966, College Football Hall of Fame inductee, 1971

== Presidents of Rice ==
The following persons have served as president of Rice University:

No.	Image	President	Term start	Term end	Ref.
1		Edgar Odell Lovett	1907	1946	
2		William V. Houston	March 1, 1946	September 19, 1960 (Note: Began a leave of absence in August 1960 for health reasons. Resigned the following month.)	
acting		Carey Croneis (Note: Provost)	August 1, 1960 (Note: Appointed acting president when President Houston began a leave of absence in August 1960.)	June 30, 1961	
3		Kenneth Pitzer	July 1, 1961	1968 (Note: Resigned to head Stanford University.)	
acting		Frank E. Vandiver	March 21, 1969	August 31, 1970	
4		Norman Hackerman	September 1, 1970	June 30, 1985	
5		George Rupp	July 1, 1985	June 30, 1993	
6		Malcolm Gillis	July 1, 1993	June 30, 2004	
7		David Leebron	July 1, 2004	June 30, 2022	
8		Reginald DesRoches	July 1, 2022	present	

Table notes:
