= Lüttge =

Lüttge is a surname. Notable people with the surname include:

- Andreas Lüttge, American chemist
- Johanna Lüttge (born 1936), German shot putter
- Marion Lüttge (born 1941), German javelin thrower, sister-in-law of Johanna
- Rudi Lüttge (1922–2016), German racewalker
