= Ralph Anderson =

Ralph Anderson may refer to:

- Ralph Anderson (wide receiver) (1936–1960), American football player who played for the Los Angeles Chargers in 1960
- Ralph Anderson (defensive back) (1949–2016), American football defensive back who played in the National Football League in the 1970s
- Ralph Anderson (architect) (1924–2010), architect, based in Seattle, Washington, United States
- Ralph Anderson (politician) (1927–2019), Democratic Party member of the South Carolina Senate beginning in 1996
- Ralph A. Anderson Jr. (1923–1990), architect, based in Houston, Texas, United States
- Ralph G. Anderson (1923–2010), American engineer, farmer, and founder of engineering firm Belcan
- Ralph J. Anderson (1888–1962), Justice of the Montana Supreme Court
- Ralph Anderson, character in The Outsider (King novel)
