= Luay Nakhleh =

Palestinian-Israeli-American computer scientist

Luay K. Nakhleh

William and Stephanie Sick Dean of the George R. Brown School of Engineering
- Incumbent
- Assumed office January 1, 2021
- Preceded by: Reginald DesRoches

Personal details
- Born: May 8, 1974 (age 52) Israel
- Citizenship: Israel; United States
- Education: BSc, 1996, Technion, Israel Institute of Technology; MSc, Texas A&M University; PhD, University of Texas at Austin

Luay K. Nakhleh (Arabic: لؤي نخله; born May 8, 1974) is a Palestinian-Israeli-American computer scientist and computational biologist. He is the William and Stephanie Sick Dean of the George R. Brown School of Engineering at Rice University. Nakhleh's research is on computational and statistical approaches to phylogenomics and comparative genomics.

== Early life and education ==
Nakhleh was born on May 8, 1974 to a Christian Palestinian family in Israel. His grandfather Elias was the first Israeli-Arab to be named Deputy Speaker of the Knesset. As his high school did not own a computer, Nakhleh spent three years taking classes in computer science before being accepted into the Israel Institute of Technology. After earning his Bachelor of Science degree, Nakhleh spent a year as a highschool teacher. He then moved to the United States for his postgraduate studies. Nakhleh earned a master's degree in computer science from Texas A&M University in 1998, and a PhD degree in computer science from the University of Texas at Austin in 2004. During his graduate studies, Nakhleh received a 2001 Texas Excellence Teaching Award, 2003-04 James C. Browne Graduate Fellowship, and 2005 Bert Kay Dissertation Award.

== Career ==
Following his PhD, Nakhleh remained in Texas and became an assistant professor of computer science at Rice University in July 2004. His early work at Rice focused on creating PhyloNet, an online tool for analyzing, reconstructing, and evaluating reticulate phylogenetic networks. He also collaborated on using language data to elucidate the (reticulate) evolutionary history of the Indo-European languages. His co-authored paper on perfect phylogenetic networks was included as one of the Linguistic Society of America's top 20 papers published in their flagship journal, Language. He received a 2009 CAREER award from the National Science Foundation and 2012 Guggenheim Fellowship to support his research on the evolution of biological networks. While serving as chair of the Computer Science department in 2018, Nakhleh was promoted to J.S. Abercrombie Professor of Computer Science. On January 1, 2021, Nakhleh became the William and Stephanie Sick Dean of the George R. Brown School of Engineering.

As Dean of Engineering, Nakhleh was also elected a Fellow of the International Society for Computational Biology, American Institute for Medical and Biological Engineering, and American Association for the Advancement of Science.

== Personal life ==
Nakhleh and his wife Mika have two children together. He holds both U.S. and Israeli citizenship.
