= Gerald Dickens =

Gerald Dickens may refer to:

- Gerald Charles Dickens (1879–1962), Royal Navy admiral
- Gerald Charles Dickens (actor) (born 1963), British actor and performer
- Gerald R. Dickens, professor of earth sciences at Rice University, Houston, Texas

== See also ==
- Peter Gerald Charles Dickens (1917–1987), Royal Navy captain
