= Sibani Lisa Biswal =

American chemical engineer

- Education: California Institute of Technology; Stanford University
- Scientific career
- Fields: Soft matter
- Workplaces: Rice University
- Thesis: Exploring Novel Structure Formation and Mechanics of Linked Chains of Magnetic Colloidal Particles and their Application in Microfluidics (2004)
- Doctoral advisor: Alice Gast

Sibani Lisa Biswal is an American chemical engineer, materials scientist, and academic administrator who researches the physics of colloids, surfactants, lipids, and polymers. She is the William M. McCardell professor in chemical engineering with a dual appointment as professor in materials science and nanoengineering as well as a senior associate dean in the George R. Brown School of Engineering at Rice University.

== Education and career ==
Biswal earned a B.S. in chemical engineering from the California Institute of Technology in 1999. She received a M.S. (2001) and Ph.D. (2004) in chemical engineering from Stanford University working with doctoral advisor Alice Gast. Her dissertation was titled, Exploring Novel Structure Formation and Mechanics of Linked Chains of Magnetic Colloidal Particles and their Application in Microfluidics. Biswal completed postdoctoral research in mechanical engineering at University of California, Berkeley from 2004 to 2006.

Biswal researches the physics of colloids, surfactants, lipids, and polymers. She joined the faculty at Rice University in 2006. Biswal was named to the William M. McCardell Professor in Chemical Engineering in 2020. The following year, she was named an associate dean in the George R. Brown School of Engineering.

== Awards and recognition ==
In 2007, Biswal was awarded a Young Investigator Award by the Office of Naval Research. In 2009, she won a National Science Foundation's CAREER award.

In 2023, she was elected a fellow of the American Physical Society after nomination by the society's Division of Soft Matter. The fellowship was awarded "[f]or fundamental contributions to understanding of the assembly of superparamagnetic colloids in magnetic fields, discovering mechanisms governing multiphase flows in porous media, characterizing molecular transport in lipid membranes, and developing porous silicon anodes for lithium-ion batteries".
