= Hebl (surname) =

Hebl is a surname. Notable people with the surname include:

- Gary Hebl (born 1951), American politician
- Mikki Hebl, American psychologist
- Tom Hebl (born 1945), American politician
