= William V. Houston =

American physicist and university president (1900–1968)

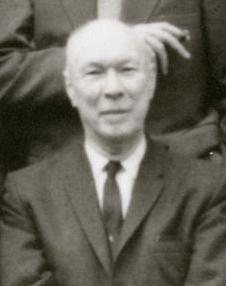
- 1963 in Copenhagen

2nd President of Rice University
- In office 1946–1961
- Preceded by: Edgar Odell Lovett
- Succeeded by: Kenneth Pitzer

Personal details
- Born: January 19, 1900 Mount Gilead, Ohio, U.S.
- Died: August 22, 1968 (aged 68) Edinburgh, Scotland
- Scientific career
- Education: Ohio State University; University of Chicago
- Awards: Rice University Medal of Honor (1962)
- Fields: Physics
- Workplaces: California Institute of Technology; Rice University
- Thesis: The structure of the red line of hydrogen and the interpretation of doublets in other elements (1925)
- Doctoral advisor: Alfred D. Cole
- Other academic advisors: Albert Michelson; Robert Millikan; Arnold Sommerfeld; Werner Heisenberg
- Doctoral students: Robert B. Leighton; Simon Pasternack

William Vermillion Houston (/ˈhaʊstən/ HOW-stən; (Note: The pronunciation of his family name is contrasts with that of the city of Houston (/ˈhjuːstən/ HEW-stən) in which he lived for much of his career.) January 19, 1900 – August 22, 1968) was an American physicist who made contributions to spectroscopy, quantum mechanics, and solid-state physics as well as being a teacher and administrator. He became the second president of Rice University in 1946.

== Education ==
Houston began his college education in 1916 at Ohio State University (OSU) where he earned his baccalaureate degree in physics. He served in the military during 1918 and 1919. After teaching physics at the University of Dubuque for one year, he entered graduate studies at the University of Chicago and studied under Albert A. Michelson, who had won the Nobel Prize in Physics in 1907, and Robert Millikan who would win the Nobel Prize in Physics in 1923 for his measurement of the charge on the electron and for his work on the photoelectric effect. It was at this time that Houston began his experimental work on the fine structure of hydrogen and was awarded an M.S. in 1922. In 1922, he returned to Ohio State, where he was an instructor in physics and studied spectroscopy under A. D. Cole. Houston was granted his Ph.D. in 1925, after which he went to the California Institute of Technology (Caltech) on a National Research Fellowship, largely because Millikan had left Chicago for Caltech in 1922. At Caltech Houston continued his work in spectroscopy and making improvements in Fabry–Pérot interferometry. At Caltech, he taught a spectroscopy course out of Atombau und Spektrallinien, which became the "bible" of atomic theory for the new generation of physicists who developed atomic and quantum physics. In 1927 and 1928, Houston was awarded a Guggenheim Fellowship, which he used to go to Germany to do postgraduate study with Arnold Sommerfeld at the Ludwig-Maximilians-Universität München and Werner Heisenberg at Leipzig University. Also studying with Sommerfeld concurrently with Houston were Carl Eckart, Edwin C. Kemble, and Rudolf Peierls. At that time, the winter semester of 1927, Sommerfeld, in his special lectures, treated the theory of electrons in metals for the first time. As a course of study, Sommerfeld suggested to Houston that he investigate the mean free path of electrons and its relationship to resistance in metals as a function of temperature. Sommerfeld showed Houston the proof of a paper soon be published on the subject of Fermi statistics applied to phenomena in metals. Houston's and Eckart's works on the subject were published in the papers following Sommerfeld's article. After spending the winter semester of 1927 with Sommerfeld, Houston went to spend the spring semester of 1928 with Heisenberg in Leipzig. There, he studied the spin-orbit interaction in two-electron spectra. Houston was able to show the transition from Russell-Saunders coupling to jj-coupling in two-electron systems and its influence on the Zeeman effect. It was at this time that Houston formed a professional and personal friendship with Felix Bloch, who did pioneer work on the motion of electrons in periodic structures.

== Career ==
After his study and research in Germany, Houston returned to Caltech and served as an assistant professor (1927–1929), associate professor (1929–1931), and professor (1931–1946). He again took up his experimental work on spectroscopy and the theory of electrons in atoms and solids. His work on the Zeeman effect resulted in a correction to the accepted value of the e/m ratio, as well as stimulating R. T. Birge and J. W. M. DuMond to work up a consistent set of precise atomic constants. In solid-state physics he studied the surface photoelectric effect and made the first suggestion and analysis of the use of soft x-rays to investigate the energy bands of solids. At Caltech, and later at Rice University, he taught a course on mathematical physics, for which he wrote a textbook.

During World War II, through the influence of Dr. Frank B. Jewett of the National Academy of Sciences, Houston became involved in undersea warfare research and development, for which he also had supervisory responsibility at installations at Harvard University, San Diego, and Key West.

In 1946, Houston became the second president of Rice Institute (now Rice University) in Houston, Texas, where he served as president and professor until 1961. He resigned as president after a serious illness in 1961, but continued his teaching responsibilities. In 1951, Houston published a textbook "Principles of Quantum Mechanics" which was widely used for teaching quantum mechanics courses. As president, Houston brought many advancements to the university, including enlargement of the graduate school, a five-year engineering program, lowering of the student-teacher ratio to 10:1, and fostering a closer relationship between the students and faculty.

In 1948 during W. V. Houston's presidency, a debate raged in the letters page of the campus newspaper, the Thresher, regarding integration of the university, explicitly forbidden by the university's original charter. This debate included letters from the executive secretary of the Houston branch of the NAACP, civil rights advocate James Dombrowski of the Southern Conference Educational Fund, and segregationist Gov. Strom Thurmond of South Carolina. After watching several months of back and forth, under pressure from Rice's board of trustees, Houston sent a note to the Thresher pointing out that this debate was "academic" because of the language of the founding charter. Rice remained segregated until a changed board filed suit to break the racial exclusion in the charter and Black students were admitted in 1963.

In 1953, Houston wrote a review of Sommerfeld's first volume of the six-volume Lectures on Theoretical Physics, based on Sommerfeld's six-semester course on theoretical physics.

Houston was productive until the day he died in Edinburgh, Scotland on August 22, 1968. He was survived by his wife, Mildred née White, whom he married in 1924.

== Textbooks ==
- William V. Houston Principles of Mathematical Physics (McGraw-Hill, 1934 and 1948)
- William V. Houston Principles of Quantum Mechanics (McGraw-Hill, 1951)
- William V. Houston Principles of Quantum Mechanics, Non-relativistic Wave Mechanics with Illustrative Applications (Dover, 1959)

== Professional Organizations ==
- American Physical Society and serving as president in 1962
- American Philosophical Society

== Honors ==
- 1943 – Elected to the National Academy of Sciences with service on the Council (1959–1962)
- Board member of the Carnegie Foundation
- Elected as Fellow of the American Academy of Arts and Sciences
- Navy Medal of Merit presented by the Secretary of the Navy for services during World War II
- Presidential appointment to the board of the National Science Foundation
- 1962 – Rice University Medal of Honor

== Selected publications ==
- W. V. Houston, "Acceleration of Electrons in a Crystal Lattice", Phys. Rev. 57, 184 (1940)
- W. V. Houston, "Die Elektronenemission kalter Metalle", Zeits. f. Physik 47, 33–37 (1928)
- W. V. Houston, "The Physical Content of Quantum Mechanics," 5 (2), 49–55 (1937). Paper cited in Robert H. Romer "Editorial: Memorable papers from the American Journal of Physics, 1933–1990", "Am. J. Phys." 59 (3), 201–207, March 1991

== Notes ==
Academic offices
Preceded by Edgar Odell Lovett	President of Rice University; 1946–1961	Succeeded by Kenneth Sanborn Pitzer
