= Simon Pasternack =

Theoretical physicist and editor (1914–1976)

- Born: 1914
- Died: January 26, 1976 (aged 61–62); Blue Point, New York, United States
- Education: University of Alberta; Caltech (PhD)
- Known for: Pasternack effect Bateman–Pasternack polynomials Kramers–Pasternack recursion relation
- Scientific career
- Fields: Physics
- Workplaces: Brookhaven National Laboratory
- Thesis: Transition Probabilities of Forbidden Lines (1939)
- Doctoral advisor: William V. Houston

Simon Pasternack (1914–January 26, 1976) was a North American theoretical physicist and editor of Physical Review. He is known for the Pasternack effect in the spectrum of hydrogen, which later became known as the Lamb shift. Kramers–Pasternack recursion relations for the fine structure and Bateman–Pasternack polynomials are also named after him.

== Life ==
Pasternack graduated from University of Alberta, and obtained a PhD from California Institute of Technology in 1939. His thesis was titled "Transition Probabilities of Forbidden Lines" and his doctoral advisor was William V. Houston.

He held teaching positions in San Bernardino Valley College and University of Pennsylvania, until joining the staff he joined the Brookhaven National Laboratory from 1947 to 1951.

He was also chairman of the International Union of Pure and Applied Physics (IUPAP), and editor of Physical Review from 1951. He shared the editorial board with Samuel Goudsmit as editor-in-chief, Pasternack being assistant editor. (Note: Source says "S. Goudsmit and S. Pasternack would take on the responsibility of the editorship at Brookhaven, with a doubled Editorial Board" which this and other sources indicate was shared responsibility.) During this time, Pasternack and Goudsmit are known for having rejected Theodore Maiman's 1960 publication of the first working laser.

He had a son and two daughters. He died from a heart attack in 1976 in Blue Point, New York.

== Research ==
During his thesis, Pasternack worked on the fine structure of hydrogen. He came up in 1937 with a mathematical relation now known as the Kramers–Pasternack recursion relation, named after him and Hans Kramers, who independently discovered them a year later.

During this time, he also theorized a new effect given a discrepancy between the predictions of the fine structure and the 1934 measurements by Robley C. Williams and Roswell Clifton Gibbs of the 2s level, which he published in 1938. This effect became known as the Pasternack effect. The effect was measured precisely by Willis Lamb and Robert Retherford in 1947 and became known as the Lamb shift. This discovery led to the development of quantum electrodynamics.

In 1939, he generalized the mathematical work of Harry Bateman, introducing what is now known as Bateman–Pasternack polynomials.

Pasternack also worked in radiation and neutron scattering. His last paper in 1963 was on hydrogen-like wavefunctions, but after that Pasternack dedicated himself exclusively to editor duties.

== Honors and awards ==
In 1999, two American Physical Society Editorial Offices were named after Goudsmit and Pasternack for their editorial work.
