= George R. Brown School of Engineering and Computing =

Academic school at Rice University

Coordinates: 29.7204°N 95.3989°W

- Type: Private
- Established: 1975
- Parent institution: Rice University
- Dean: Luay Nakhleh
- Faculty: 136
- Undergraduates: 1,466
- Postgraduates: 1,032
- Location: Houston, Texas, United States
- Campus: Urban, 285 acres (1.15 km^{2})
- Website: engineering.rice.edu

The George R. Brown School of Engineering and Computing is an academic school at Rice University in Houston, Texas. It contains the departments of Bioengineering, Chemical and Biomolecular Engineering, Civil and Environmental Engineering, Computational Applied Mathematics and Operations Research, Computer Science, Electrical Engineering and Computer Engineering, Materials Science and Nanoengineering, Mechanical Engineering, and Statistics. Engineering has been part of Rice's curriculum since the university's founding in 1912, but the school was not established as its own unit until 1975.

== History ==
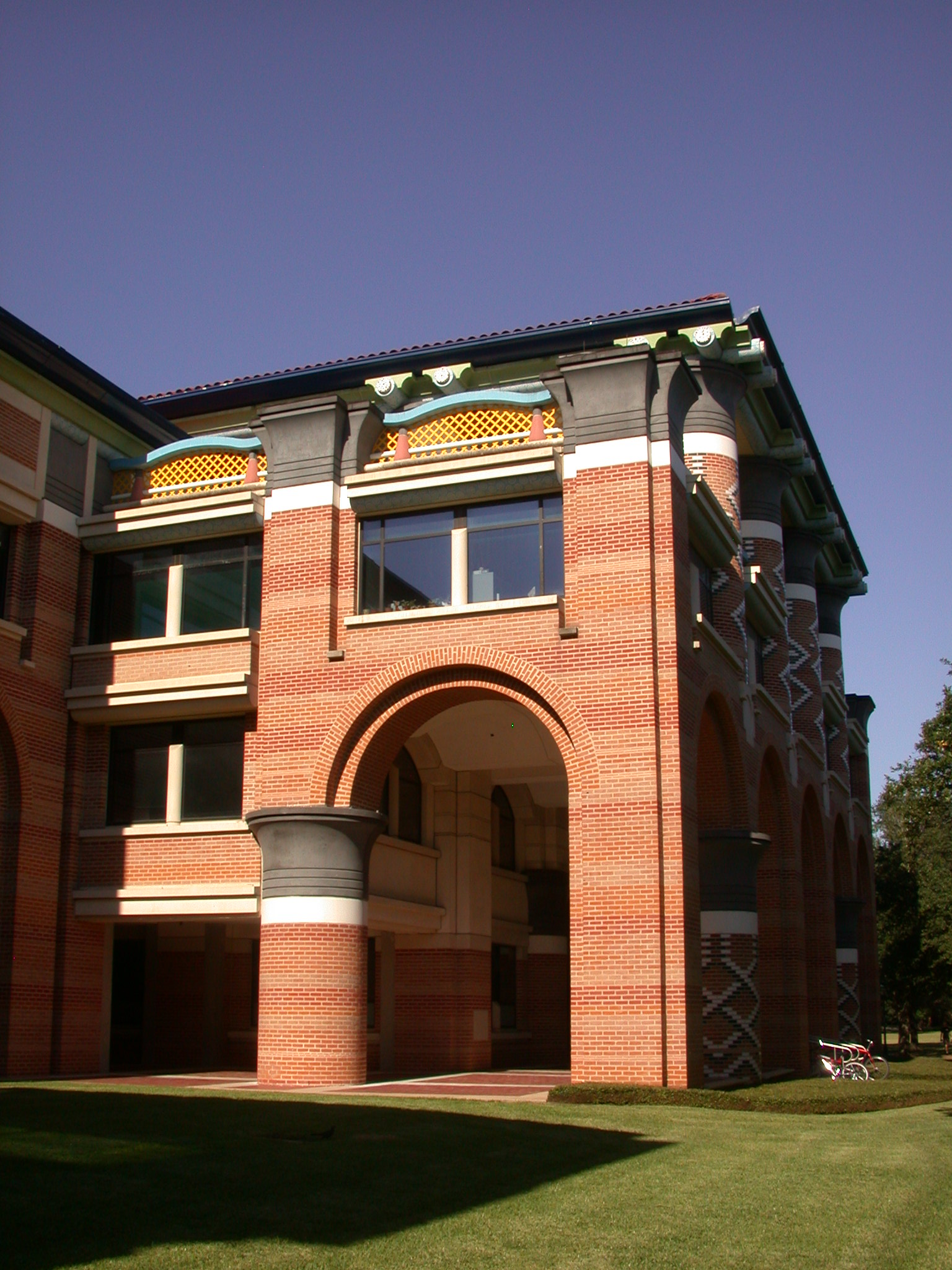
Duncan Hall, home of computational engineering at Rice

In its earliest days, Rice offered courses in chemical, civil, mechanical and electrical engineering. Over the years, the engineering program grew, and in 1975 the George R. Brown School of Engineering was established and named after George R. Brown, a major donor and leader of Brown & Root Inc. Presently, the school comprises nine academic departments and includes 22 engineering-related research institutes and centers. One third of Rice's students are engineering majors. On September 25, 2024, the school was renamed from George R. Brown School of Engineering to George R. Brown School of Engineering and Computing.

== Teaching ==
Among the more than 136 engineering faculty are 9 members of the National Academy of Engineering, 3 members of the National Academy of Sciences and 2 members of the National Academy of Medicine. Students work closely with professors, often working in labs and research projects. More than 60 percent of undergraduates have had significant research experience by the time they graduate. Research expenditures in FY 2018-19 exceeded $76 million. Departments and centers within the school of engineering take advantage of Houston's role as a center for the energy industry, medical research, space exploration, and the city's rapidly growing high-technology sector. Several departments have active industrial affiliates programs, and many research projects are undertaken with local companies. Students benefit from these relationships through collaborative research projects, summer internships, and making contacts for employment before graduation.

== Faculty in National Academies of Sciences, Engineering, and Medicine ==
- Pedro J. J. Alvarez, National Academy of Engineering
- Richard Baraniuk, National Academy of Engineering
- Reginald DesRoches, National Academy of Engineering
- Naomi Halas, National Academy of Engineering; Sciences
- Lydia Kavraki, National Academy of Medicine
- Antonios Mikos, National Academy of Engineering; Medicine
- Rebecca Richards-Kortum, National Academy of Engineering; Sciences
- Pol Spanos, National Academy of Engineering
- Richard A. Tapia, National Academy of Engineering
- Ned Thomas, National Academy of Engineering
- Moshe Vardi, National Academy of Engineering; Sciences
- Karen Lozano, National Academy of Engineering
- Lydia Kavraki, National Academy of Engineering

== Notable alumni ==
- C. Sidney Burrus (BA '57, BS '58, MS '60) - American electrical engineer widely known for his contributions to digital signal processing, especially FFT algorithms, IIR filter design, and wavelets
- John Doerr (BS '73) - venture capitalist at Kleiner, Perkins, Caufield & Byers, CEO of Silicon Compilers and co-founder of the @Home Network, on the Board of Directors of Intuit, Amazon.com, PalmOne, Sun Microsystems, Google, and Segway
- Charles Duncan Jr. (BS '47) - American entrepreneur, administrator, and politician best known for serving as U.S. Secretary of Energy on the Cabinet of President Jimmy Carter from 1979 to 1981
- Lynn Elsenhans (BA '78) - former Chairperson, Chief Executive Officer and President of Sunoco
- Kevin Harvey (BS '87) - venture capitalist, founding member of and general partner at Benchmark
- Jeffrey A. Hoffman (MMS '88) - American former NASA astronaut, made five flights as a Space Shuttle astronaut, including the first mission to repair the Hubble Space Telescope in 1993
- Tim League (BS '92) - founder of the Alamo Drafthouse Cinema chain and the founder of the film distribution company Drafthouse Films
- Michael Loren "Fuzzy" Mauldin (BA '81) - retired computer scientist and the inventor of the Lycos web search engine
- Arun Netravali (BS '69, PhD '71) - pioneer in the development of digital video technology including HDTV, former president of Bell Laboratories
- John D. Olivas (PhD '96) - American engineer and a former NASA astronaut
- Pete Olson (BA '85) - U.S. Representative for Texas's 22nd congressional district, serving since 2009
- Geoffrey Orsak (BA '85, MEE '86, PhD '90) - engineering academic, former dean of the Lyle School of Engineering at Southern Methodist University
- Vladimir Rokhlin Jr. (PhD '83) - professor of computer science and mathematics at Yale University, co-inventor of the fast multipole method in 1985
- Hector Ruiz (PhD '73) - former CEO & executive chairman of semiconductor company Advanced Micro Devices, Inc.
- Dorry Segev (BS, BA '92) - transplant surgeon known for his role in getting the HIV Organ Policy Equity Act signed into law
- Fred I. Stalkup (BA '57, PhD '62) - known for his work in the field of oil and gas production, member of the National Academy of Engineers
- Jimmy Treybig (BA '63, BS '64) - founded Tandem Computers
