= Edgar Odell Lovett =

American mathematician

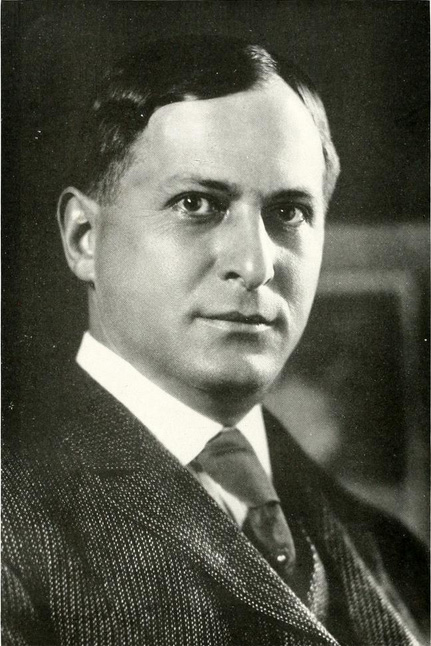
- Lovett pictured in The Campanile 1917, Rice yearbook

1st President of Rice University
- In office 1912–1946
- Succeeded by: William V. Houston

Personal details
- Born: April 14, 1871 Shreve, Ohio, US
- Died: August 13, 1957 (aged 86) Houston, Texas, US
- Education: Bethany College (BA); University of Virginia (PhD); University of Leipzig (PhD)
- Scientific career
- Fields: Mathematics
- Workplaces: Johns Hopkins University; University of Virginia; University of Chicago; Princeton University; Rice University
- Thesis: The great inequality of Jupiter and Saturn (1895)

Edgar Odell Lovett (April 14, 1871 – August 13, 1957) was an American educator and education administrator.

He was the first president of Rice Institute (now Rice University) in Houston, Texas. Lovett was recommended to the post by Woodrow Wilson, then president of Princeton University.

== Biography ==
=== Early life and career ===
Lovett was born in Shreve, Ohio, to Zephania and Maria Elizabeth (née Spreng) Lovett. After graduating from Shreve High School, he earned his B.A. at Bethany College in Bethany, West Virginia, in 1890. Lovett taught and studied at West Kentucky College, in Mayfield, Kentucky, and completed his first doctorate degree at the University of Virginia in 1895. He completed his second doctorate in mathematics under the instruction of Sophus Lie at the University of Leipzig. In 1897, Lovett lectured at Johns Hopkins University, the University of Virginia, and the University of Chicago. In September 1897 he became an instructor at Princeton University, and in December he married Mary Ellen Hale. Mary Ellen was the daughter of the founder and head of West Kentucky College and the two met while he was there from 1890 to 1892 (Mary Ellen graduated from West Kentucky in 1892). He worked his way from instructor to assistant professor of mathematics (1898), professor (1900), and finally the head of the Department of Mathematics and Astronomy at Princeton (1908). He was elected as a member of the American Philosophical Society in 1904.

When planning Rice Institute, the board of trustees sought recommendations for the role of president from the presidents of other universities. Lovett was chosen on the recommendation of Woodrow Wilson, then president of Princeton, and was invited to become Rice's first president in 1907. He accepted and was inaugurated in 1908. Following his inauguration, Lovett was deeply involved in the planning of the university. He oversaw the acquisition of a new site for the campus, the initial architectural planning, the development of the curriculum, and the recruitment of faculty and students. Additionally, Lovett went on a world tour to study the workings of universities and technological institutes in Europe and Japan. Lovett announced his retirement from Rice in 1941, but stayed on through World War II, finally resigning on March 1, 1946. He was succeeded by William Vermillion Houston.

=== Family ===
Lovett and his wife had two daughters and two sons.

Mary Ellen became homebound with severe arthritis and rarely left their residence at the Plaza Hotel in Houston from 1929 until her death in 1952. Lovett died in 1957 at Houston hospital after a two-week illness, and is buried at Glenwood Cemetery in Houston, Texas.

Adelaide Lovett graduated from Rice Institute, then went to study at the Sorbonne in Paris. Her mother stayed in Paris with her. In 1922, Adelaide earned her diplome de la Sorbonne, and returned to Houston. Later that year she married Walter Browne "W." Baker (son of James A. Baker and brother of James A. Baker Jr.), a prominent Houston banker who was awarded the Department of the Navy's Distinguished Civilian Service for his service during World War II in managing the purchasing of equipment for the Navy. Adelaide was a co-founder and first president of the Houston Junior League in 1924.

Henry Malcolm Lovett graduated from Rice and then obtained a law degree from Harvard University. After returning to Houston he joined the law firm of Baker & Botts (Baker, Botts, Parker & Garwood, now Baker Botts) in 1924 (with James A. Baker Jr., father of James Addison Baker III), and served as chairman of the Rice University board of trustees 1967 to 1973. He served on the Board of Advisors of Harvard Law School from 1965 to 1971. Henry and his wife Martha Wicks set up the Henry Malcolm Lovett Endowment Fund for the Fondren Library and the Martha and Henry Malcolm Lovett Distinguished Service Professor of Musicology at Rice University.

== Legacy ==
- Lovett Boulevard in southwest Houston, which runs from Taft Street west to just south of Westheimer Road, was named in his honor.
- The administration building was renamed Lovett Hall on December 4, 1947, to honor then-President Emeritus Lovett.
- Lovett College, a residential college at Rice University, was named after him.
- As part of Rice University's centennial celebrations in 2012, an 8-foot bronze sculpture of Lovett was erected .
- Edgar Odell Lovett Elementary School was named for him.

== Bibliography ==
- Boles, John B. (2007). University Builder: Edgar Odell Lovett and the Founding of the Rice Institute. Baton Rouge, Louisiana: Louisiana State University Press. ISBN 978-0-8071-3275-3.
- Fox, Stephen (2001). The Campus Guide: Rice University. Princeton, NJ: Princeton Architectural Press. ISBN 978-1-56898-246-5.

Academic offices
Preceded by New position	President of Rice University; 1912–1946	Succeeded by William Vermillion Houston
