= Bateman polynomials =

In mathematics, the Bateman polynomials are a family F_{n} of orthogonal polynomials introduced by Harry Bateman (1933). The Bateman–Pasternack polynomials are a generalization introduced by Simon Pasternack (1939).

Bateman polynomials can be defined by the relation

$$F_n\left(\frac{d}{dx}\right)\operatorname{sech}(x) = \operatorname{sech}(x)P_n(\tanh(x)).$$

where P_{n} is a Legendre polynomial. In terms of generalized hypergeometric functions, they are given by

$$F_n(x)={}_3F_2\left(\begin{array}{c}-n,~n+1,~\tfrac12(x+1)\\ 1,~1 \end{array}; 1\right).$$

Pasternack (1939) generalized the Bateman polynomials to polynomials F^{m}_{n} with

$$F_n^m\left(\frac{d}{dx}\right)\operatorname{sech}^{m+1}(x) = \operatorname{sech}^{m+1}(x)P_n(\tanh(x))$$

These generalized polynomials also have a representation in terms of generalized hypergeometric functions, namely

$$F_n^m(x)={}_3F_2\left(\begin{array}{c}-n,~n+1,~\tfrac12(x+m+1)\\ 1,~m+1 \end{array}; 1\right).$$

Carlitz (1957) showed that the polynomials Q_{n} studied by Touchard (1956) , see Touchard polynomials, are the same as Bateman polynomials up to a change of variable: more precisely

$$Q_n(x)=(-1)^n2^nn!\binom{2n}{n}^{-1}F_n(2x+1)$$

Bateman and Pasternack's polynomials are special cases of the symmetric continuous Hahn polynomials.

== Examples ==
The polynomials of small n read

$$F_0(x)=1$$;
$$F_1(x)=-x$$;
$$F_2(x)=\frac{1}{4}+\frac{3}{4}x^2$$;
$$F_3(x)=-\frac{7}{12}x-\frac{5}{12}x^3$$;
$$F_4(x)=\frac{9}{64}+\frac{65}{96}x^2+\frac{35}{192}x^4$$;
$$F_5(x)=-\frac{407}{960}x-\frac{49}{96}x^3-\frac{21}{320}x^5$$;

== Properties ==
=== Orthogonality ===
The Bateman polynomials satisfy the orthogonality relation

$$\int_{-\infty}^{\infty}F_m(ix)F_n(ix)\operatorname{sech}^2\left(\frac{\pi x}{2}\right)\,dx = \frac{4(-1)^n}{\pi(2n+1)}\delta_{mn}.$$

The factor $(-1)^n$ occurs on the right-hand side of this equation because the Bateman polynomials as defined here must be scaled by a factor $i^n$ to make them remain real-valued for imaginary argument. The orthogonality relation is simpler when expressed in terms of a modified set of polynomials defined by $B_n(x)=i^nF_n(ix)$, for which it becomes

$$\int_{-\infty}^{\infty}B_m(x)B_n(x)\operatorname{sech}^2\left(\frac{\pi x}{2}\right)\,dx = \frac{4}{\pi(2n+1)}\delta_{mn}.$$

=== Recurrence relation ===
The sequence of Bateman polynomials satisfies the recurrence relation

$$(n+1)^2F_{n+1}(z)=-(2n+1)zF_n(z) + n^2F_{n-1}(z).$$

=== Generating function ===
The Bateman polynomials also have the generating function

$$\sum_{n=0}^{\infty}t^nF_n(z)=(1-t)^z\,_2F_1\left(\frac{1+z}{2},\frac{1+z}{2};1;t^2\right),$$

which is sometimes used to define them.
