= Frank E. Vandiver =

American historian

- Vandiver in 1969

President of Texas A&M University
- In office September 1, 1981 – August 31, 1988
- Preceded by: Charles H. Samson Jr.
- Succeeded by: William H. Mobley

President of North Texas State University
- In office 1979–1981
- Preceded by: Calvin Cleave "Jitter" Nolen
- Succeeded by: Howard Wellington Smith Jr.

Acting President of Rice University
- In office 1969–1970
- Preceded by: Kenneth Pitzer
- Succeeded by: Norman Hackerman

Personal details
- Born: December 9, 1925 Austin, Texas, U.S.
- Died: January 7, 2005 (aged 79) College Station, Texas, U.S.
- Spouses: Carol Sue Smith (m. 1952; died 1979) Renee Aubry Carmody (m. 1981)
- Children: 3
- Education: University of Texas (MA); Tulane University (PhD)
- Occupation: Historian, educator
- Awards: Several honorary degrees Rockefeller Fellowship

Academic work
- Discipline: Historian
- Sub-discipline: American Civil War expert
- Institutions: Washington University; Louisiana State University; Rice University; North Texas State University; Texas A&M University

Frank Everson Vandiver (December 9, 1925 – January 7, 2005) was an American Civil War historian, the 19th president of Texas A&M University and the former president of the University of North Texas, as well as acting president of Rice University. Vandiver wrote, co-wrote, or edited 24 books, and published over 100 scholarly articles or reviews. His 1977 book Black Jack: The Life and Times of John J. Pershing, was a runner-up for the National Book Award.

== Early years ==
Vandiver was born on December 9, 1925, in Austin, Texas, to Harry Shultz and Maude Folmsbee (née Everson) Vandiver. He attended the public schools but was eventually pulled out by his parents, in favor of private tutoring. He joined the United States Army Air Forces during World War II and served as a historian.

Despite not having a high school diploma, following the war Vandiver was admitted to a graduate program at the University of Texas at Austin to study humanities and American studies through passing qualifying examinations. He was awarded a Rockefeller Fellowship for his studies.

Vandiver received his Master of Arts degree from the University of Texas in 1949 and was awarded a Doctor of Philosophy degree from Tulane University in 1951. In 1963 he received an M.A. degree by decree from University of Oxford.

== Teaching ==
After graduation, Vandiver accepted a teaching position in the Arts and Sciences at Washington University in St. Louis, but left within a few years to teach at Rice University, becoming a full professor in 1958. He taught during the summer sessions at Louisiana State University from 1953 to 1957. Over the next two decades at Rice, Vandiver was promoted to department chair, master of Brown College, provost, and vice president, serving as the acting president in 1969–1970. In 1963-1964 he served as Harold Vyvyan Harmsworth Professor of American History at University of Oxford. In 1969 during his tenure as acting president, Houston Independent School District awarded Vandiver his only missing degree - a high school diploma. In 1979 Vandiver left Rice to become the president of North Texas State University, now known as the University of North Texas. He was the first chancellor of North Texas State University and the Texas College of Osteopathic Medicine in addition to his duties as president.

== Texas A&M University ==
In 1981 Vandiver became president of Texas A&M University. During his tenure, Vandiver was a driving force behind the adoption of a law creating the National Space Grant College and Fellowship Program. Colleges given this designation would gain federal funds to research space-related technologies. Vandiver believed that Texas A&M was well-positioned to become one of the first of these institutions and remarked that such a designation would "elevate Texas A&M from being an excellent institution for space-related studies to being a great one".

Vandiver resigned as president of A&M in 1988, citing a desire to spend more time on research and writing. Rather than leave the university, he established the Mosher Institute for Defense Studies, a national defense think tank, in 1988. The institute was closed in 1993. He was also named a distinguished professor in the history department.

== Writing ==
Vandiver wrote, co-wrote or edited 24 books, most centered on the American Civil War. Almost half of his books were still in print at the time of his death, including his first book Ploughshares Into Swords: Josiah Gorgas and Confederate Ordnance (1952). His 1977 book Black Jack: The Life and Times of John J. Pershing, was a runner-up for a National Book Award. He also published over 100 scholarly articles or reviews.

Vandiver was awarded many honors for his work. Among these were honors from two Civil War Round Tables (Houston and Baton Rouge). The Houston Civil War Round Table renamed their annual award of merit the Frank E. Vandiver Award in 1985. Vandiver was also awarded a distinguished service award from the Houston chapter of the Texas Society, Sons of the American Revolution, and was named an honorary professor at the National University of Asunción in Paraguay.

== Personal life ==
The Houston Chronicle described Vandiver as "a colorful and articulate man with much personal charm". He was married twice. His first wife Carol Sue Smith died in 1979. Vandiver married Renee Aubry Carmody in 1981. He had three children.

He received several honorary degrees during his life. He was awarded an HHD degree from Austin College in 1977. In 1989 and 1994 he was awarded an honorary DHL degree and BA degree from Lincoln College.

Vandiver died at his home in College Station, Texas, on January 7, 2005.

== Selected works ==
- Ploughshares Into Swords: Josiah Gorgas and Confederate Ordnance (1952)
- Rebel Brass: The Confederate Command System (1956)
- Mighty Stonewall (1957)
- Jubal's Raid: General Early's Famous Attack on Washington in 1864 (1960)
- Their Tattered Flags: The Epic of the Confederacy (1970)
- Black Jack: The Life and Times of John J. Pershing (1977) — runner up for National Book Award
- Blood Brothers: A Short History of the Civil War (1992)
- Shadows of Vietnam: Lyndon Johnson's Wars (1997)
- 1001 Things Everyone Should Know About the Civil War (1999)
- 1001 Things Everyone Should Know About World War II (2000)
