= Blaine E. Brownell =

American architect, educator and author

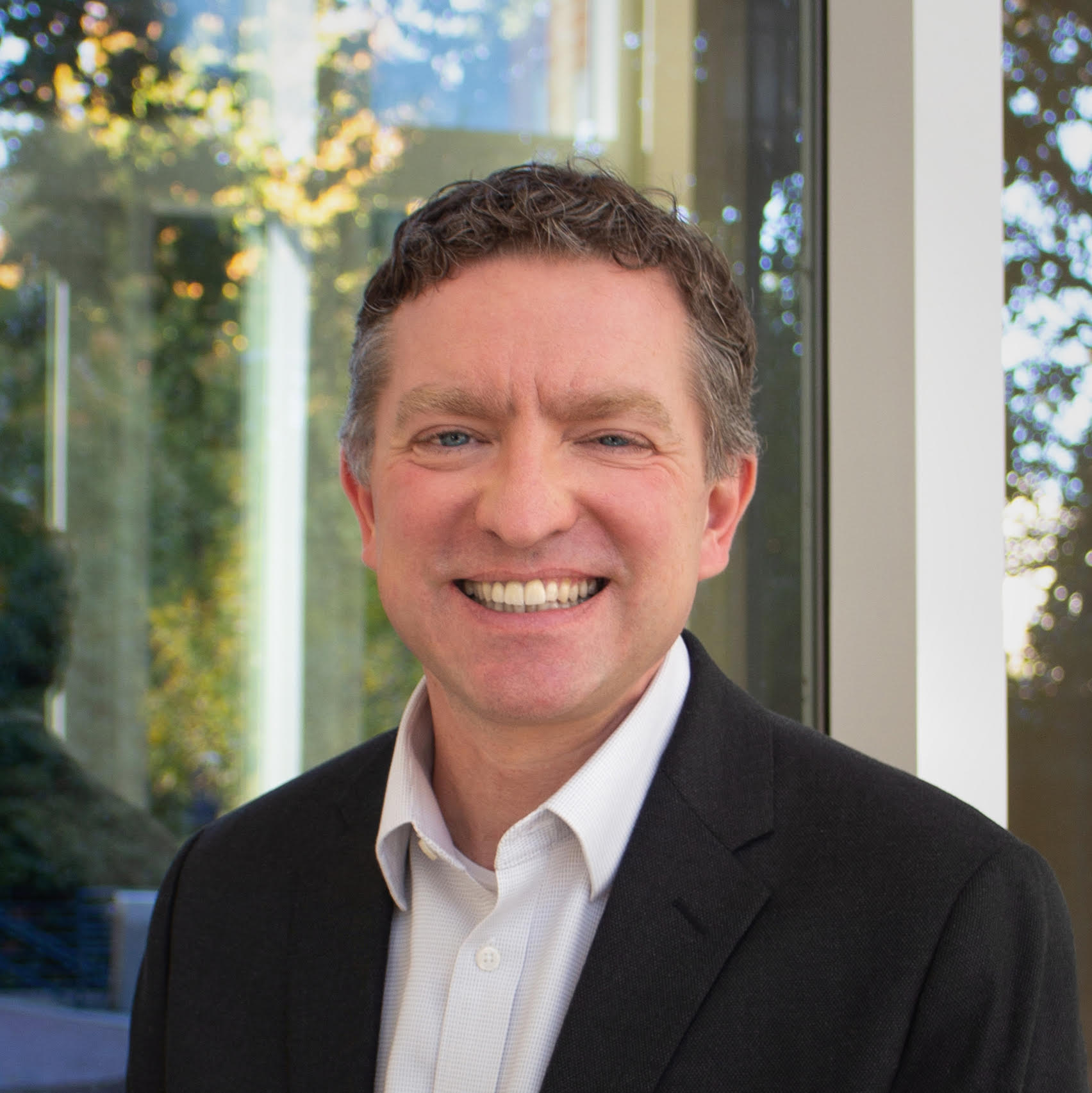
- Born: March 22, 1970 (age 56); Lafayette, Indiana, United States
- Parent(s): Blaine A. Brownell, Mardi T. Brownell
- Awards: Fulbright scholarship, Fellow of the American Institute of Architects

Academic background
- Education: Princeton University; Rice University

Academic work
- Discipline: Architecture

Blaine Brownell (born March 22, 1970) is an American architect, author, and educator. In 2020 he was appointed Director of the School of Architecture at the University of North Carolina at Charlotte.

Brownell is a leading scholar on advanced and emergent materials for architecture and design, and the author of the Transmaterial book series (2006–2017).

== Biography ==
Brownell earned a B.A. in architecture with a Certificate in East Asian Studies at Princeton University in 1992, and a Master of Architecture from Rice University in 1998. He practiced for seven years at NBBJ in Seattle, Washington. In 2006 he became a Fulbright Scholar to Japan with a focus on emergent materials and applications in architecture and design. After a visiting professorship at the University of Michigan, Ann Arbor, Brownell taught at the University of Minnesota School of Architecture, Minneapolis starting in 2008, eventually serving as director of graduate studies and interim department head. In 2020 he became the Director of the School of Architecture at the University of North Carolina at Charlotte.

Developing an interest early in his architectural and teaching career in the use of innovative materials in the building industry, Brownell initiated a research effort in the late 1990s which led to his authorship of several books on the subject, including the Transmaterial series, a comprehensive survey of a spectrum of new materials with the potential for enhancing the functionality, environmental impact, and aesthetic properties of buildings. He has also written on the topic of utilizing existing material in novel ways in architecture, for example in Material Strategies: Innovative Applications in Architecture and in Hypernatural: Architecture's New Relationship with Nature. Brownell authors the recurring "Mind & Matter" column as well as a large number of online articles on a variety of topics for Architect magazine.

== Books ==
- Brownell, Blaine (2006). Transmaterial: A Catalog of Materials That Redefine Our Physical Environment. New York: Princeton Architectural Press. ISBN 978-1568985633.
- Brownell, Blaine (2008). Transmaterial 2: A Catalog of Materials That Redefine Our Physical Environment. New York: Princeton Architectural Press. ISBN 978-1568987224.
- Brownell, Blaine (2010). Transmaterial 3: A Catalog of Materials That Redefine Our Physical Environment. New York: Princeton Architectural Press. ISBN 978-1568988931.
- Brownell, Blaine (2011). Matter in the Floating World: Conversations with Leading Japanese Architects and Designers. New York: Princeton Architectural Press. ISBN 978-1568989969.
- Brownell, Blaine (2012). Material Strategies: Innovative Applications in Architecture. New York: Princeton Architectural Press. ISBN 978-1568989860.
- Brownell, Blaine; Swackhamer, Marc (2015). Hypernatural: Architecture's New Relationship with Nature. New York: Princeton Architectural Press. ISBN 978-1616892722.
- Brownell, Blaine (2017). Transmaterial Next: A Catalog of Materials that Redefine Our Future. New York: Princeton Architectural Press. ISBN 978-1616895600.
- Brownell, Blaine, ed. (2020). Examining the Environmental Impacts of Materials and Buildings (Practice, Progress, and Proficiency in Sustainability). IGI Global. ISBN 978-1799824268.

== Awards and honors ==
- 2020: American Institute of Architects' College of Fellows
- 2017: Best Books of 2017, American Society of Landscape Architects, Washington, DC.
- 2016: Key Scientific Article, Advances in Engineering, Ottawa, Ontario, Canada
- 2012: NCARB Award Honorable Mention, National Council of Architectural Registration Boards
- 2007-2008: Visiting professor in Sustainable Design, Taubman College of Architecture and Urban Planning, University of Michigan
- 2007: RIBA International Book Award Nomination, Royal Institute of British Architects, for "Transmaterial: A Catalog of Materials That Redefine Our Physical Environment"
- 2006-2007 Fulbright Scholar, Tokyo University of Science, Noda, Japan
- 2006: 40 Under 40 Award, Building Design+Construction Magazine
