= Elias Bongmba =

Cameroonian-American theologian

Elias Kifon Bongmba (born 1953) is a Cameroonian-American theologian.

== Biography ==
Bongmba received a BA from Sioux Falls College in 1987, an M.Div. from North American Baptist Seminary in Sioux Falls in 1989, an MA from the University of Iowa in 1991, and a Ph.D. from The University Denver and the Iliff School of Theology, where he studied under Professor Jere Surber. His doctoral dissertation was titled African Witchcraft and Otherness: A Philosophical and Theological Critique of Intersubjective Relations. Bongmba joined the Department of Rice University at Rice University, Houston, in 1995. Bongmba holds the Harry and Hazel Chair in Christian Theology. His research focuses on African Religions, World Christianity, and Religion and Health. Bongmba is past editor of the Journal of Religion in Africa and Past Managing Editor of Religious Studies Review. Bongmba served as the President of the African Association for the Study of Religion (AASR) from 1995-2005 and during those years, was a member of the International Committee of the International Association of the History of Religion, the parent organization of AASR. is a member of the American Academy of Religion and the African Studies Association.

Bongmba and Odelia Yuh Ngala Bongmba, serve as Goodwill ambassadors of Ndu Baptist Hospital of the Cameroon Baptist Convention Health Board.

Publications:

1. African Witchcraft and Otherness: A Philosophical and Theological Critique of Intersubjective Relations (SUNY Press, 2001).
2. Facing a Pandemic: The African Church and the Crisis of HIV/AIDS (Baylor University Press, 2007)
3. The Dialectics of Transformation in Africa, Palgrave MacMillan, Winner of the 2006 Frantz Fanon Prize in Caribbean Though2006
4. Witchcraft as Social Diagnosis: Traditional Ghanaian Beliefs and Global Health, (With Roxane Richter and Thomas Flowers), 2017.
5. Traditional African Bonesetters and Western Medical Practitioners : Fractured Patient Care Systems in Cameroon, Ethiopia, Ghana, and Zimbabwe, London: Anthem Press, 2026.

Bongmba is editor and co-editor of the following books:

1. Elias Kifon Bongmba The Wiley Blackwell Companion to African Religions
2. Living on the Edge: Essays in Honor of Steve de Gruchy Activist & Theologian, eds. James R. Cochrane, Elias Bongmba, Isabel Phiri, Des van der Water. (Pietermaritzburg, South Africa: Cluster Publications, 2012).
3. Elias Kifon Bongmba The Routledge Companion to Christianity in Africa, New York: Routledge, 2015.
4. Elias Kifon Bongmba Religion and Social Reconstruction in Africa, New York, Routledge, 2016.
5. Elias Kifon Bongmba, The Routledge Handbook on African Theology, New York; Routledge 2020.
6. Elias Kifon Bongmba and Robert Manzinger, eds. Philosophy and its Others: Contemporary Legacies of German Idealism, (Bloomsbury, 2023)
7. Peter White, Martina Bjokander and Elias Kifon Bongmba, Pentecostalism in The Postcolony: Dilectics, Dynamics, and Transformations in Africa, 2027.

Bongmba has also published over eighty peer reviewed journal essays and encyclopedia and dictionary entries.

Awards

Elias Bongmba has received several awards over the years recognizing and honoring his contributions to his fields of study.

1. In 1986 he was named Mr. Pan African, at a Conference at Mankato State University.
2. He received the Purple Feather Award from Sioux Falls College in 1987. In 1988.
3. Bongmba was awarded the Dorothy Powell Award for Excellence in Heritage and Thought by the North American Baptist Seminary, where he studied theology under Professor Stanley Grenz.
4. In 2007 Bongmba was awarded the Frantz Fanon Prize, presented by the Caribbean Philosophical Association, for Outstanding Work in Caribbean Thought for his book Dialectics of Transformation in Africa.
5. In 2020 Bongmba received the Ray L. Hart Service Award for his dedication to his field of study.

== Selected Academic papers ==
- Toward a Hermeneutic of Wimbum Tfu, (African Studies Review 41, no. 3,1998: 165–91)
- African Witchcraft and Otherness: A Philosophical and Theological Critique of Intersubjective Relations, (SUNY Press, 2001).
- On Love: Literary Images of A Phenomenology of Love in Ngugi Wa Thong'o's 'The River Between', (Literature and Theology 15, no. 4 (2001): 373–95)
- Fabian and Levinas on Time and the Other: Ethical Implications, (Philosophia Africana 4, no. 1 2001: 7–26.)
- Reflections on Thabo Mbeki's African Renaissance, (Journal of Southern African Studies 30, no. 2, 2004)
- Phenomenological Humanism: Lewis Gordon on Reclaiming the Human in an Anti-Human World, (The CLR James Journal 14, no. 1, 2008: 245–68)
- Beyond Reason to Interdisciplinary Dialogue on Morality and Politics in Africa: Comments on E. C. Eze’s ‘Between History and the Gods: Reason, Morality, and Politics in Today’s Africa, (Africa Today 55, no. 2, 2008: 98–104)
- A Comment on Friedman and Rossi’s Dialectical Theory and the Study of HIV/AIDS: A Broad Marxist Critique, (Dialectical Anthropology 35, no. 4, 2011: 443–47)
- Responsibility and Governance, (Africa Institute of South Africa, 2013)
- Homosexuality and Otherness in the African Church, (Journal of Religion and Violence 4, no. 1, 2016: 15–38)
- Witchcraft as a Social Diagnosis: Traditional Ghanaian Beliefs and Global Health, (Lexington Books, 2017)
- Church, Disability, and Development: The Case of the Cameroon Baptist Convention Health Board, (Mzuni Press, 2019)
- Land Disputes and Family Ties in Cameroon: Debating the Possibilities of Reconciliation, (African Sun Media, 2019)
- What Has Kinshasa to Do with Athens? Methodological Perspectives on Theology and Social Science in Search for a Political Theology, (Brill, 2020)
