= Diana McSherry =

American computer scientist and biophysicist

Diana McSherry (born 1945) is an American computer scientist and biophysicist. She is known for her research in and development of computer-based systems to analyze heart function. Her system produced computer images of the circulation system and heart, allowing physicians to observe circulatory and heart functions without surgery. This system was developed in the 1970s and was revolutionary at the time, given that computational approaches to medicine was a burgeoning field.

== Education ==
McSherry received her B.A. in physics in 1965 from Harvard University. She went on to earn an M.A., also in physics, from Rice University in 1967. McSherry continued her education at Rice University, earning a Ph.D. in nuclear physics in 1969. She stayed at Rice University for one year after receiving her Ph.D. as a fellow in nuclear physics. After this stint as a fellow at Rice, McSherry changed career tracks and has spent the rest of her career working in the corporate field.

== Career ==
McSherry began working at Digicon, Inc. as a research physicist in ultrasonics in 1969 and continued at this position until 1974. In 1974 she was promoted to the position of executive vice president of the medical ultrasound department. After Digicon, Inc. was acquired by Digisonics, Inc. in 1977, McSherry became the president of cardiology analytical systems. She has since risen to the position of Digisonics' CEO, a position she currently maintains. Under her leadership, Digisonics creates ultrasound equipment for use in cardiology, radiation, and obstetrics/gynecology. McSherry has also been a chair on the board of directors for Information Products Systems, Houston.

== Honors and recognition ==
McSherry is a member of many professional organizations. She holds memberships in the American Institute of Ultrasound in Medicine, the Institute of Electrical and Electronics Engineers, the American Heart Association, and the American Physical Society.
