= Riki Kobayashi =

American chemical engineer (1924–2013)

- Born: May 24, 1924; Harris County, Texas
- Died: July 19, 2013 (aged 89); Houston, Texas
- Occupations: chemical engineer, professor

Riki Kobayashi (1924–2013) was a chemical engineer and a long-time professor of chemical engineering at Rice University. A native of Harris County, Texas, he attended Rice University (then known as Rice Institute) and earned the Bachelor of Science in chemical engineering at the age of 19. After serving in the U.S. Army, he went to the University of Michigan, where he earned the Master of Science degree in 1946 and the Doctor of Philosophy degree in 1951, both in chemical engineering. He became a member of the Rice faculty in 1951 and remained there until he retired in 1994. He died July 19, 2013, in Houston, Texas.

== Professional career ==
Kobayashi was a diligent researcher who was widely known for his investigations of thermodynamic and transport properties, particularly of natural gas liquids and hydrates. He has been credited with writing at least 200 articles for professional journals. In 1949, he was a co-author of the Handbook of Natural Gas Engineering, which is still used by engineers in the industry. Later, while teaching at Rice University, he became well known for his pioneering work in phase equilibrium, physical properties and transport properties which were highly important to the development of the natural gas processing industries.

He belonged to several professional associations, including:

- American Chemical Society (ACS)
- American Institute of Chemical Engineers (AIChE)
- American Institute of Chemists
- American Institute of Mining, Metallurgical, and Petroleum Engineers
- Academy of Medicine, Engineering and Science of Texas
- Japan Institute of Chemical Engineering
- National Academy of Engineering (NAE)

He also belonged to Sigma Chi, Alpha Chi Sigma, Tau Beta Pi, Phi Lambda Upsilon, and Phi Kappa Phi.

Dr. Kobayashi was addressed simply as Riki by nearly all of his graduate students throughout his career. Graduate students who had come directly from Japan were the exception; they used the Japanese honorific "sensei" (teacher), a sign of great respect.

== Honors and awards ==
The AIChE honored Kobayashi by presenting a symposium in his honor in 1987, where the society called him, "...one of the century's most prolific researchers in thermodynamic and transport properties." He received many other professional honors during his lifetime. Among these were:

- Appointed to Louis Calder Chair in Chemical Engineering at Rice in 1965.
- Outstanding Engineering Award by Rice University in 1985.
- First annual Donald Katz Award by the Gas Processors Association in 1985.
- Election to National Academy of Engineering (NAE) in 1995. (Note: The NAE citation reads:"For advances in the knowledge and measurement of the thermodynamic and transport properties of natural gas liquids and gas hydrates.")
- Albert Einstein Medal awarded by the Russian Academy of Natural Sciences in 2010.

The Riki Kobayashi Fellowship in Chemical Engineering was created in his honor. The first award was made in 2005.

== Personal life ==
Kobayashi was born in Webster, Texas on May 13, 1924. His parents were Mitsutaro and Moto Shigeta Kobayashi. (Note: The 1940 U. S. Census shows the Kobayashi family living in Precinct 2, Harris County, Texas) Both parents were born in Japan. Mitsutaro Kobayashi's occupation was listed as a farmer. He was survived by his wife, two sons, two stepdaughters, a brother and three sisters as well as his grandchildren.
