= Eilaf Egap =

- Education: University of Washington; Stony Brook University
- Scientific career
- Institutions: Emory University; Massachusetts Institute of Technology; Rice University
- Thesis: New Organic Semiconductors for Electronics and Optoelectronics (2011)
- Doctoral advisor: Samson Jenekhe

Eilaf Egap (née Ahmed) is an adjunct assistant professor of Materials Science at Rice University. She works on imaging techniques and biomaterials for early diagnostics and drug delivery. She was a Massachusetts Institute of Technology MLK Visiting Scholar in 2011.

== Early life and education ==
Egap was born in Athens, Ohio, and went to school in New York City. She started her academic career at Stony Brook University as a philosophy major, but was inspired by her chemistry professor and switched to chemistry. She graduated from Stony Brook University in 2005. She completed her postgraduate studies in 2011 at the University of Washington under the supervision of Samson Jenekhe. Her doctoral work focused on the design and synthesis of organic macromolecules. She examined the structure–property relationships of these macromolecules in next generation electronic devices, including organic field-effect transistors, organic photovoltaics and light-emitting diodes. She investigated how charge carriers and excitons are confined in 0D and 1D nanostructures. This included benzobisthiazole-thiophene copolymers, which can be used for OFETs and OPVs. She worked on oligothiophene-functionalised naphthalene diimide nanowires that can form in solution. Whilst at the University of Washington she developed electron-transport materials for efficient blue phosphorescent OLEDs, using FIrpic and oligoquinolines.

Ahmed joined Massachusetts Institute of Technology as a postdoctoral fellow with Timothy M. Swager. She was a Martin Luther King Jr. Visiting Scholar between 2011 and 2013. She developed a platform that used polymer nanoparticles for in vivo imaging. She won the Gordon Research Conferences Carl Storm Award in 2013 and a graduate award at the MIT Polymer Day in 2014.

== Research ==
Egap joined Emory University in 2014. At the same time she held a joint position at Georgia Institute of Technology at the Wallace H. Coulter Department of Biomedical Engineering. She has explored the polymer chemical properties that can impact their ability to self-assemble.

She won the 2015 Thieme Publishers Chemistry Award. In 2016 she was named by Chemical & Engineering News as a Must See at the American Chemical Society national meeting. She presented her work on ways to align one-dimensional polymer nanowires. She was awarded a National Science Foundation award to explore open-shell conjugated oligomers and polymers. The polymer backbone units incorporate polythiophene and quinoidal units. She explored how ultra-fast transient absorption spectroscopy and scanning probe microscopy can be used to characterise the systems. She is interested in spin-polarisation and spin-exchange. She ran an eight-week summer program for students from historically black colleges and universities to take part in research.

Egap was one of the 2017 Emerging Investigators in the Journal of Materials Chemistry C. She demonstrated how near-infrared emitting triblock copolymers could be incorporated into an oligo(ethylene glycol) core for targeted drug delivery. The core-shell nanoparticles can be used to target folate receptor cancer cells. In 2017 she moved to Rice University. She explored how to synthesise functional polymers using photosensitive quantum dots as a catalyst. The technique is known as photo-controlled atom transfer radical polymerization and could replace the current catalysts used to synthesise block copolymers and methacrylates. In 2018 she was named as one of the American Chemical Society Polymer Materials Science Engineering (PMSE) Young Investigator award prize.
