= Ka Yiu San =

American bioengineer and academic

Ka Yiu San is an American bioengineer currently on the faculty at Rice University and an Elected Fellow of the American Association for the Advancement of Science.

== Education ==
In 1978, San earned a BS degree from Rice University. San earned a MS and PhD degrees from the California Institute of Technology.

== Career ==
San is a professor of Bioengineering Department and Chemical Engineering Deparyment at Rice University in Houston, Texas. San is the head of the Metabolic Engineering Lab. San has over 25 patents and patent applications. San is the co-author of Bioengineering Fundamentals, a text book.
