= B. Jill Carroll =

American businesswoman

B. Jill Carroll is an American freelance writer, speaker, scholar and organizational consultant whose first career was as a university professor specializing in world religions and philosophy of religion. She was the executive director of the Boniuk Center for the Study and Advancement of Religious Tolerance at Rice University and an adjunct professor of Religious Studies at the university.

== Career ==
She earned her PhD degree at Rice University in 1994.

In the late 90s, she wrote "The Adjunct Track", a regular column for the Chronicle of Higher Education. She founded Adjunct Solutions, a consulting service for part-time faculty in North America.

She worked at the Boniuk Center at Rice University until June 2009, when she stated her intentions to continue writing a blog for the Houston Chronicle entitled "Talking Tolerance" and staying involved in the leadership of the Amazing Faiths Project which she had founded and directed since 2006.

Her research interests are issues in comparative religion, religion and world politics, and natural theology. For two years, she co-hosted with Kym King a regular radio program called "Peaceful Coexistence" on Pacifica 90.1FM KPFT in Houston. Podcasts of the show are available at the Boniuk Center website.

In fall 2011, she published a lifestyle/self-help book called Stop the Crap: Six Lessons to Get Your Life Back. Her first novel, Quail Fried Rice, was published in July 2012.

In 2011, she began working as a program consultant for the Houston/Gulf Coast chapter of American Leadership Forum.

In 2015, she published some of the posts from her blog as a book entitled Talking Tolerance: Reflections on Religion in a Free Society.

She was president and founder of Religiosites, Inc., a company that provided religious diversity training to corporations, groups and individuals.

== Family ==
She is married with two children.

== Scholarly publications ==
- A Dialogue of Civilizations: Gülen's Islamic Ideals and Humanistic Discourse. The Light, Inc., 2007.
- The Savage Side: Reclaiming Violent Models of God. Rowman & Littlefield, 2001.
- "Elizabeth Fiorenza", "Center for Women and Religion", "Rosemary Ruether". Entries in Handbook for American Women's History, Second Edition. Angela Howard and Frances Kavenik, eds. Sage Publications, 2000.
- Religion and Violence in Blood Meridian, Essays from the First Cormac McCarthy Conference, Bellarmine College. Texas Western Press: El Paso, 1997.
