= Ann Saterbak =

American engineer

Ann Saterbak is a professor of biomedical engineering and engineering design and communication at Duke University, and is a co-author of Bioengineering Fundamentals. She formerly worked at Rice University, as a professor of biomedical engineering.

Saterbak holds a B.A. in chemical engineering and biochemistry from Rice University (1990) and a Ph.D. in chemical engineering from the University of Illinois at Urbana-Champaign (1995).

Saterbak is a recipient of the Robert G. Quinn Award, presented by the American Society for Engineering Education. In the fall of 2025, Saterbak was awarded the Fulbright award, funding her cross-cultural work in engineering education in Malawi, Singapore, and Uganda. Saterbak also worked as the lead author for the textbook Bioengineering Fundamentals.

== Selected publications ==
- Cano, M. L., A. Saterbak, R. van Compernolle, M. P. Williams, M. E. Huot, I. A. Rhodes, C. C. Allen "A Laboratory Batch Reactor Test for Assessing Nonspeciated Volatile Organic Compound Degradation in Activated Sludge". Water Environment Research, 75 (4) (2003): 342–354.
- Volz, T. M., A. Saterbak. "Students' Strengths and Weaknesses in Evaluating Technical Arguments Revealed through Implementing Calibrated Peer Review in a Bioengineering Laboratory". Across the Disciplines, accepted for publication, 2008.
- "Ann Saterbak". Duke Biomedical Engineering. Retrieved October 10, 2025.
