= Garrett L. Washington =

- Occupation: Historian

Academic background
- Education: Rice University (BA) Paris 8 University (DEA) Purdue University (PhD)
- Doctoral advisor: Sally Hastings

Academic work
- Discipline: History
- Sub-discipline: History of Japan, Religion in Japan
- Institutions: University of Massachusetts Amherst

Garrett L. Washington is an American historian of Japan. He is an associate professor of history at the University of Massachusetts Amherst. He specializes in religious, spatial, and women's histories in late 19th and early 20th century Japan.

== Biography ==
Washington received a BA degree from Rice University. He received a diplôme d'études approfondies from the Paris 8 University and a PhD from Purdue University.

Washington was a postdoctoral fellow with the Japan Society for the Promotion of Science from 2007-2008, and an Andrew W. Mellon Postdoctoral Fellow at Oberlin College from 2009 to 2011. In 2026, Washington was a Japan Foundation Fellow at Kokugakuin University,, as well as an affiliated researcher at Meiji Gakuin University's Institute for Christian Studies.

Washington currently teaches courses on modern and traditional Japan, Japanese women's history, Japanese imperialism, US-Japan relations, and race, religion and nation in East Asia at UMass-Amherst.

== Publications ==
- Church Space and the Capital in Prewar Japan (2021) University of Hawaii Press. ISBN 978-0-8248-8886-2
- Garrett L. Washington, ed. Christianity and the Modern Woman in East Asia (Leiden: Brill, 2018). Including Garrett L. Washington, "Christianity and 'True Education': Yasui Tetsu’s Contribution to Women’s Education in Imperial Japan," 134–162. ISBN 978-90-04-36910-8
