= Kannan Moudgalya =

Professor at IIT Bombay

Kannan M. Moudgalya
- Born: 11 March 1958 (age 68)
- Education: Indian Institute of Technology Madras; Rice University
- Scientific career
- Fields: Chemical Engineer
- Workplaces: Indian Institute of Technology Mumbai

Kannan M. Moudgalya (born 11 March 1958) was an Indian professor of Chemical Engineering, Systems and Control, and Education Technology at IIT Bombay. He retired from IIT Bombay on 1 August 2025. He is now a Founder Director in EduPyramids Educational Services Pvt. Ltd., a startup at SINE, IIT Bombay.

== Education ==
Kannan earned his Bachelor of Technology degree with distinction in chemical engineering from Indian Institute of Technology Madras in 1980 and master's degree in electrical engineering from Rice University, Houston in 1985. He received his doctoral degree in the same year in chemical engineering from Rice University, Houston.

== Research career and spoken tutorials ==
Kannan M. Moudgalya was an Erach and Meheroo Mehta Advanced Education Technology Chair Professor at IIT Bombay. He was a visiting professor at the University of Alberta.

He held the posts of Associate Dean (R&D), Head of Application Software Cell and Head of the Centre for Distance Engineering Education Programme, at IIT Bombay. He was a member of the Standing Committee of the National Mission on Education through ICT, MHRD, Government of India. He is a life member of International Society for Technology in Education and Computer Society of India, and a member of IEEE.

He has written two textbooks: (1) Digital Control, pub-lished by John Wiley & Sons, Chichester and (2) Optimization: theory and practice, jointly with Prof. Mohan C. Joshi, published by Narosa, New Delhi. He has published a large number of papers in refereed international journals and conferences in the areas of mathematical modelling, control and simulation.

He retired from IIT Bombay in 2023, after 35 years of service.

== Fellowships and awards ==
Moudgalya has been awarded as "Pt. Deen Dayal Upadhyaya Recognition for Re-Engineering India 2020" in the Farmer Welfare/Industry/Institutional Category for having paved the path for multi lingualism by envisaging and curating spoken tutorials in various Indian languages for education, employment and empowerment.

The Spoken Tutorial project received Reimagine Education Award in 2015, by coming first in Nurturing Employability category sponsored by QS and Wharton School. He has also received Google MOOCs Research Award for Extending the Offline Capability of Spoken Tutorial Methodology in 2015.
