= Qilin Li =

Professor of Civil and Environmental Engineering

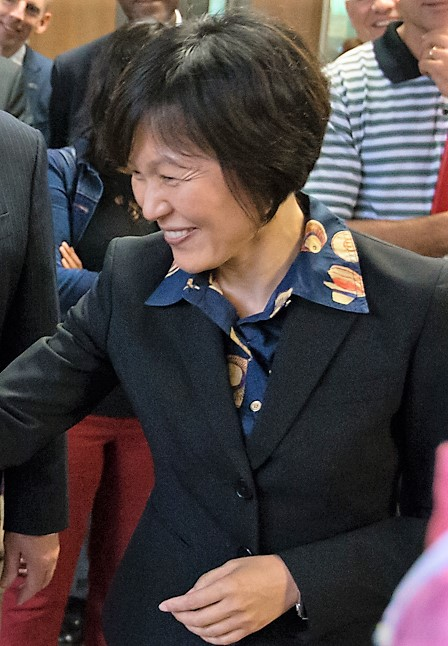
- Li at Rice University in 2017
- Education: Tsinghua University (BS); University of Illinois at Urbana Champaign
- Scientific career
- Workplaces: Rice University; Yale University
- Thesis: Competitive Adsorption of Trace Organic Compounds by PAC in Membrane Filtration Systems (2002)

Qilin Li is a Chinese environmental engineer who is a professor of Civil and Environmental Engineering at Rice University. She develops new technologies to analyze and treat contaminated water. Li is a Fellow of the International Water Association.

== Early life and education ==
Li is from China. She earned her undergraduate degree at Tsinghua University. She moved to the United States for her graduate studies, joining the University of Illinois at Urbana–Champaign as a doctoral student. She worked on membrane filtration systems with Vernon Snoeyink. After completing her PhD Li moved to Yale University, where she worked as a postdoctoral fellow.

== Research and career ==
Li studies water contamination and treatment. She joined the faculty at Rice University in 2006. The research of the Li laboratory for Advanced Water Treatment Technologies includes analysis of how membranes become fouled during filtration, how to remove salt from seawater and how to use nanotechnology to clean water.

She is the Associate Director of the Center for Nanotechnology Enabled Water Treatment (NEWT). Here she was awarded a $1.7 million United States Department of Energy grant to develop new technologies that make use of sunlight and nanoparticles to treat water. Li created the Nanophotonics Enabled Solar Membrane Distillation (NESMD), which combines a traditional porous membrane with low-cost light-capturing nanoparticles. Membrane distillation is cheap and can be operated in low temperature, low pressure environments. In NESMD, highly localized solar illumination and photothermal heating drives the process of membrane distillation. She was elected Fellow of the International Water Association in 2018. At the 2019 American Water Summit Li and her NESMD devices were awarded first place in the Tech Idol competition.

In 2019 Li was awarded one of Rice University's InterDisciplinary Excellence Awards, using which she combined resource management and efforts to encourage more sustainable resource consumption on the Rice campus. Li serves as Co-Chair of the International Water Association Nano & Water Specialty Group.

== Selected publications ==
- Li, Qilin (2008-01-01). "Antimicrobial nanomaterials for water disinfection and microbial control: potential applications and implications". Water Research. 42 (18): 4591–4602. doi:10.1016/j.watres.2008.08.015. PMID 18804836.
- Li, Qilin (2013-08-01). "Applications of nanotechnology in water and wastewater treatment". Water Research. 47 (12): 3931–3946. doi:10.1016/j.watres.2012.09.058. PMID 23571110.
- Li, Qilin (2004-09-01). "Organic fouling and chemical cleaning of nanofiltration membranes: measurements and mechanisms". Environmental Science & Technology. 38 (17): 4683–4693. Bibcode:2004EnST...38.4683L. doi:10.1021/es0354162. PMID 15461180.
