= Mikki Hebl =

American psychologist

- Occupations: Professor of Psychology and Management
- Awards: Robert Foster Cherry Award for Professor of the Year (2016)

Academic background
- Education: Smith College; Texas A&M University; Dartmouth College

Academic work
- Institutions: Rice University
- Website: https://www.mikkihebl.com/

Michelle (Mikki) Rae Hebl is an applied psychologist whose research focuses on workplace discrimination and barriers experienced by stigmatized individuals. She is the Martha and Henry Malcolm Lovett Professor of Psychological Sciences at Rice University and affiliated with the Jones Graduate School of Business.

Hebl was the 2016 recipient of Baylor University's national Robert Foster Cherry Award for great teaching. She has received more than 20 teaching awards, including Rice University's George R. Brown Prize for Superior Teaching (multiple years), and the Distinguished Teaching Contributions Award from the Society of Industrial/Organizational Psychology (2008). After receiving the George R. Brown Certificate of Highest Merit (2015), Hebl was retired from receiving further teaching awards from Rice University.

== Biography ==
Hebl in a native of Pardeeville, Wisconsin. She received her B.A. degree in psychology with honors at Smith College in 1991, where she studied with Professor Phil Peake. Hebl completed a master's degree in psychology at Texas A&M University in 1993. She then attended Dartmouth College where she obtained her Ph.D. in psychology in 1997 under the supervision of Robert E. Kleck. Her dissertation titled "Nonstigmatized individuals' reactions to the acknowledgment and valuation of a stigma by overweight individuals and physically disabled individuals" began a line of research on social stigma.

Hebl joined the faculty of Rice University in 1998. She has received multiple research grants, including funding from the National Institutes of Health, the National Cancer Institute, and an ADVANCE award from the National Science Foundation. In 2014, Hebl received the Academy of Management's Sage Award for Scholarly Contributions.

Hebl is an avid long-distance runner who has completed a marathon in every state and on every continent.

== Research ==
Hebl's research program examines social stigma and discrimination in the workplace and other professional settings, including health care and customer service. Stigmatized groups may include, e.g., pregnant women, members of racial and ethnic minorities, and individuals with disabilities or obesity. Hebl and her students have studied discrimination experienced by members of the LGBT community and pregnant women completing job applications, as well as obese patients receiving medical treatment, including efforts to reduce discrimination against these groups.

Hebl reports that people often experience subtle forms of discrimination in these settings that have considerable impact on their lives. In her work on racial bias, she focuses on how support for diversity, equity, and inclusion (DEI) initiatives might reduce inequality among White and Black professionals. However, people are affected by various subtexts in DEI conversations (such as hazy definitions of diversity, passive language, and deficiency-oriented descriptions). By focusing on this under-researched barrier to DEI activities, the researchers wanted to show how organizations might live up to their stated commitment to advance true diversity and equity.

== Representative publications ==
- Griffith, Kristin H.; Hebl, Michelle R. (2002). "The disclosure dilemma for gay men and lesbians: 'Coming out' at work". Journal of Applied Psychology. 87 (6): 1191–1199. doi:10.1037/0021-9010.87.6.1191. PMID 12558225.
- Hebl, Michelle R.; Foster, Jessica Bigazzi; Mannix, Laura M.; Dovidio, John F. (June 2002). "Formal and Interpersonal Discrimination: A Field Study of Bias Toward Homosexual Applicants". Personality and Social Psychology Bulletin. 28 (6): 815–825. doi:10.1177/0146167202289010. S2CID 18909977.
- Hebl, Michelle R.; Heatherton, Todd F. (April 1998). "The Stigma of Obesity in Women: The Difference is Black and White". Personality and Social Psychology Bulletin. 24 (4): 417–426. doi:10.1177/0146167298244008. S2CID 143697452.
- Hebl, Michelle R.; King, Eden B.; Lin, Jean (October 2004). "The Swimsuit Becomes Us All: Ethnicity, Gender, and Vulnerability to Self-Objectification". Personality and Social Psychology Bulletin. 30 (10): 1322–1331. doi:10.1177/0146167204264052. PMID 15466604. S2CID 18346150.
- Hebl, M. R.; Xu, J. (August 2001). "Weighing the care: physicians' reactions to the size of a patient". International Journal of Obesity. 25 (8): 1246–1252. doi:10.1038/sj.ijo.0801681. PMID 11477511. S2CID 12093969.
