= Fred I. Stalkup =

- Born: Frederick Irving Stalkup Jr. 1935; Texas, U.S.
- Occupation: Chemical engineer
- Years active: 1961 - Present

Fred I. Stalkup (born 1935) is a native of Texas and known for his work in the field of oil and gas production. After graduation from high school in Waco, Texas, he was admitted to Rice University where he earned a Bachelor of Arts in chemical engineering in 1957 and a Ph. D. in chemical engineering in 1961. (Note: Dr. Stalkup's PhD dissertation was, "The Study of High Pressure Vapor-Liquid Equilibria by GasLiquid Partition Chromatography".) Stalkup joined the ARCO Oil and Gas Company in 1961 as a senior research engineer. He became director of process research in 1965, senior research advisor in 1985, and distinguished research advisor in 1993. Stalkup remained with the ARCO organization until 2002, when he joined PetroTel Inc, where he is currently Vice President of EOR (Enhanced oil recovery) and Distinguished Engineering Advisor. (Note: PetroTel Inc., based in Plano, Texas, performs consulting, advisory and project management services for petroleum production companies.)

Dr. Stalkup's areas of expertise include recovery methods, water flooding, miscible flooding, surfactant flooding, in-situ combustion; phase behavior and flow mechanisms; prediction methods; laboratory research; field testing and application; reservoir engineering and simulation; and rock properties.

He has been active in the Society of Petroleum Engineers (SPE), a member of the National Academy of Engineers (NAE), and authored a number of technical papers. (Note: Dr. Stalkup is one of only three SPE members who have won all three top technical awards of that organization (the Uren, Lucas and Carll awards).)

== Awards and honors ==
- Lester C. Uren award from SPE (1985).
- Distinguished Member Award from SPE (1985)
- Elected Member of National Academy of Engineering (1985)
- Lucas Gold Medal from SPE (1995)
- John Franklin Carll Award from SPE (2008)
- Honorary membership in SPE (2013)
- SPE Legion of Honor (2013)
