= Ralph A. Anderson Jr. =

American architect

Ralph A. Anderson Jr. (January 1, 1923 – February 3, 1990) was an architect, based in Houston, Texas, USA. After completing his B.A. in architecture at Rice University in 1943, he served in the United States Infantry in the European Theatre of Operations. He received a head wound at the Battle of the Bulge, and was consequently awarded both the Purple Heart and the Bronze Star. He became partner in the firm Wilson, Morris, Crain & Anderson in 1952, which had become just Crain and Anderson by 1978. Anderson retired in 1988.

== Career ==
Anderson designed several houses that were built in Houston while still an undergraduate. As a professional, his early residential architecture exhibited the hallmarks of modernism with sleek, contemporary styling and flat roofs, usually in compact settings. To fit all of the client's requirements on a small Miami lot, Anderson designed an upstairs swimming pool for the home of John Turner.

But Anderson would become known for his large-scale commercial designs. Among his most notable projects was the Astrodome, for which he was tasked with growing grass indoors. His early attempt to use artificial turf in the project was rebuffed, though problems with growing grass after the facility's completion eventually led to the installation of AstroTurf.

Anderson was also actively involved in many of Houston's civic organizations and served as president of the Contemporary Arts Museum Houston; the Houston Botanical Society; and Friends of Fondren Library.

== Partial list of buildings ==
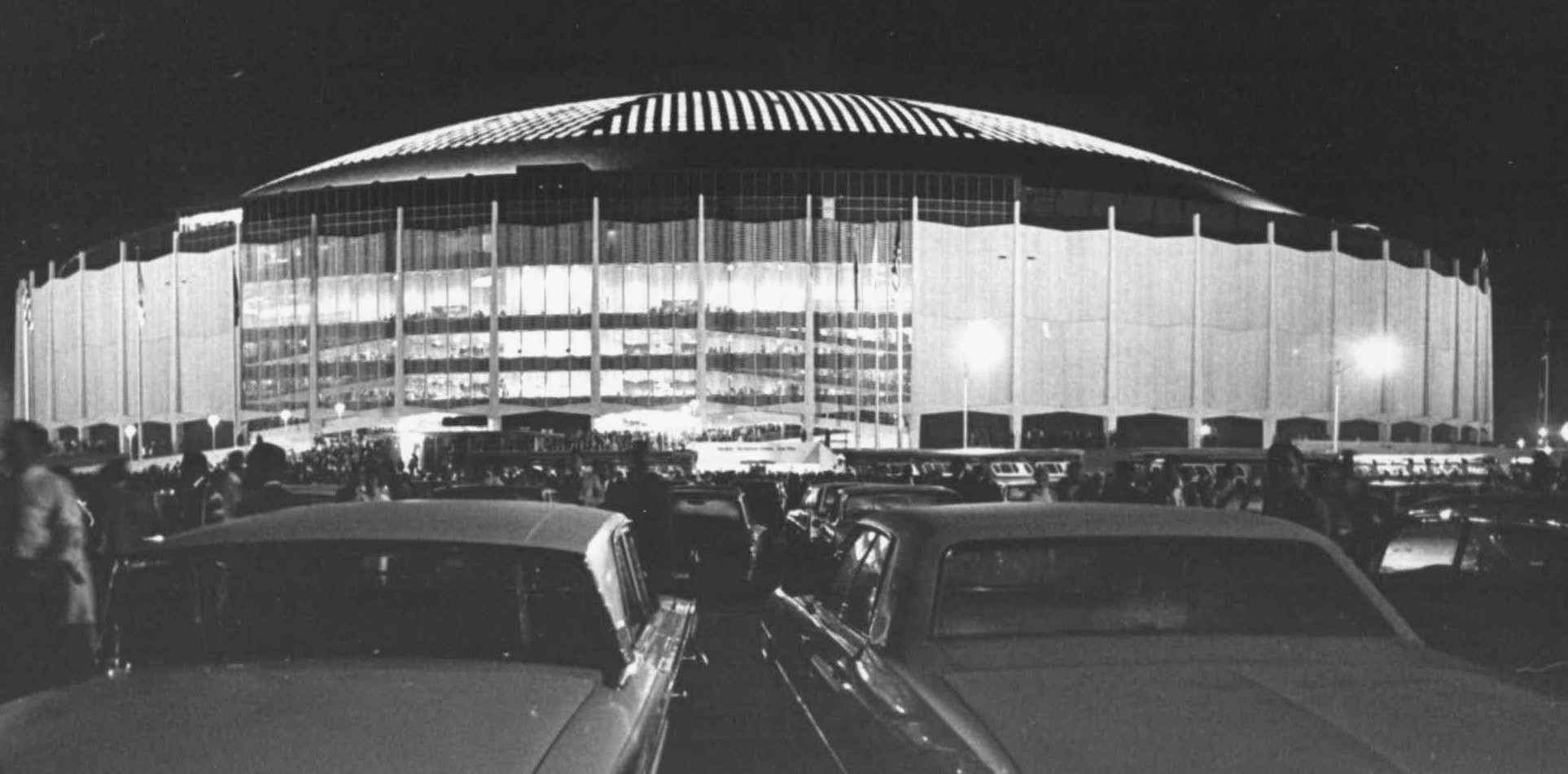
The Astrodome in 1965

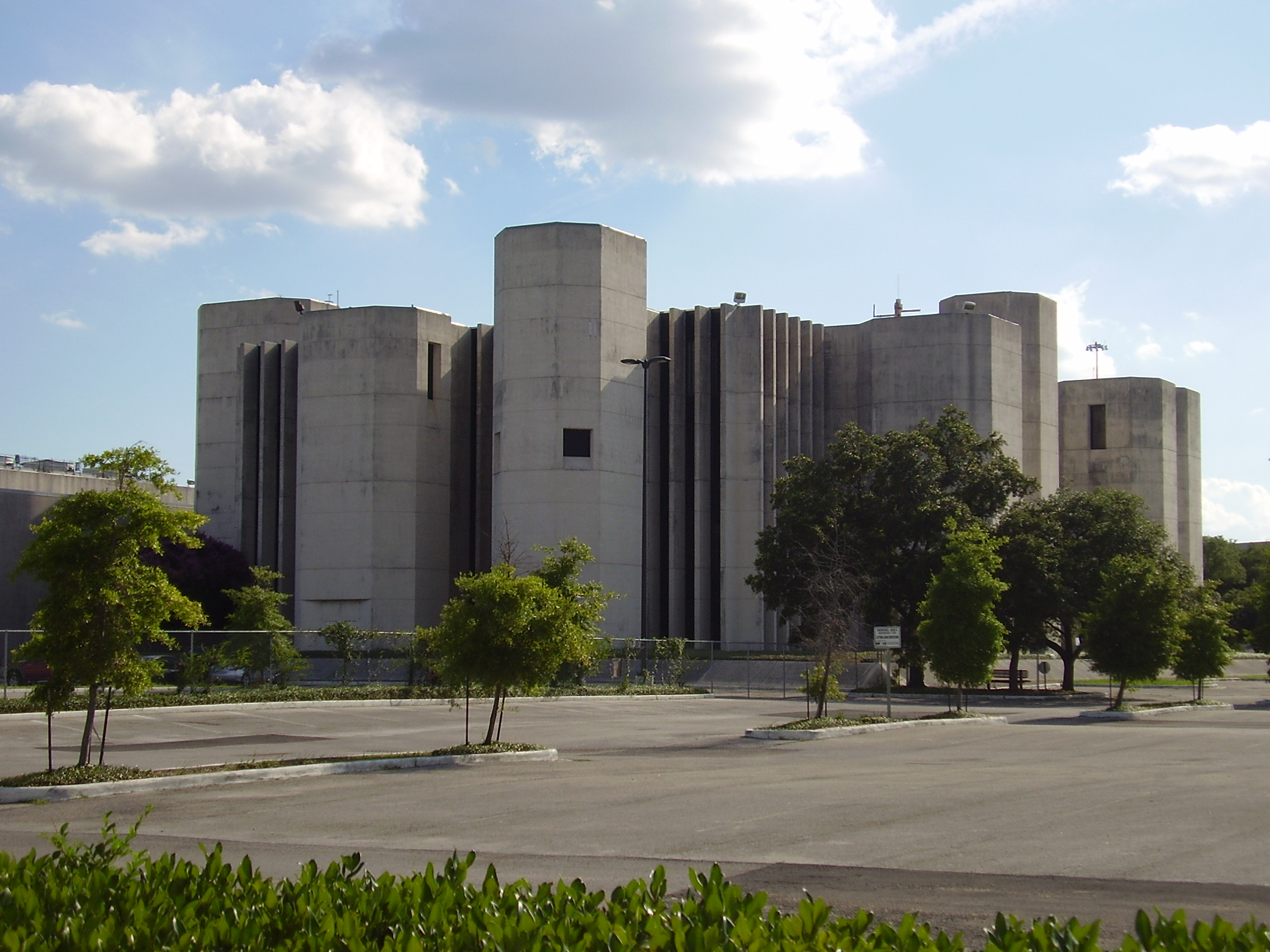
Houston Post Building

- Trimble House (1947)
- J. Edwin Smith House (1949)
- Worden House (1955; demolished)
- Turner House (1957)
- Anderson House (1960)
- World Trade Center Houston (1962)
- Kelsey-Seybold Clinic (1963)
- Astrodome (1965)
- Houston Post Building (1969)
- Austin American-Statesman Building
- Frank Erwin Center, UT-Austin (1977)
- Shepherd House (1978)
