= Andreas Luttge =

Andreas Lüttge is Professor of Earth Science and Professor of Chemistry at Rice University in Houston, Texas (USA). He was also director of the National Corrosion Center (NCC) until 2010. The primary concerns of his research are surface chemical processes at minerals and rocks from low-temperature conditions up to the pressure and temperature conditions throughout the Earth's crust.

Andreas Luttge's degrees are a Habilitation [venia legendi] (1995) and a PhD [Dr. rer. nat.] (1990) from the University of Tübingen (Germany). In 1995 the Alexander von Humboldt Foundation awarded a Feodor Lynen fellowship to Andreas Luttge to visit Yale University and to work with Prof. A.C. Lasaga.

Luttge published numerous studies about the surface dynamics of minerals, glasses and metals, including investigations of microbial activity at interfaces. He applies various experimental techniques using vertical scanning interferometry, electron microscopy, and atomic force microscopy and modeling techniques such as Monte Carlo and ab initio methods. Resulting quantitative kinetic rate data are key prerequisites to provide a better understanding of the dynamics governing many geologic and technologic processes.
