= Reginald DesRoches =

American civil engineer and college president (born 1967)

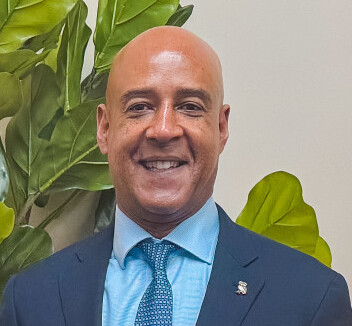
- DesRoches in 2025

8th President of Rice University
- Incumbent
- Assumed office July 1, 2022
- Preceded by: David Leebron

Personal details
- Born: April 30, 1967 (age 59) Port-au-Prince, Haiti
- Education: University of California, Berkeley (BS, MS, PhD)
- Awards: Fellow of the American Society of Civil Engineers (2016); Member of the National Academy of Engineering (2020)

Reginald DesRoches (born April 30, 1967) is an American civil engineer who has served as the president of Rice University since July 1, 2022. From 2020 until 2022, he served as provost of Rice. Earlier, beginning in 2017, he was the dean of engineering at Rice's school of engineering, and from 2012 to 2017, DesRoches held the Karen and John Huff Chair at the Georgia Institute of Technology.

Born in Port-au-Prince, Haiti, DesRoches graduated from high school in New York City. He attended college and graduate school at the University of California, Berkeley, and earned his doctorate in structural engineering in 1998.

DesRoches was elected as a member into the National Academy of Engineering in 2020 "for research and design of resilient infrastructure systems to mitigate damage from natural disasters and other extreme conditions"

== Early life and career ==
Reginald DesRoches was born in Port-au-Prince, Haiti, and grew up in Queens, New York City. He attended St. Francis Preparatory High School in New York City and the University of California, Berkeley.

From the University of California, Berkeley, DesRoches received a Bachelor of Science with a major in mechanical engineering in 1990, a Master of Science in civil engineering in 1992, and a Doctor of Philosophy in structural engineering in 1998.

In 2015, he was inducted into the University of California, Berkeley Department of Civil and Environmental Engineering's Academy of Distinguished Alumni.

=== Georgia Institute of Technology ===
During his tenure as Karen and John Huff School Chair at Georgia Tech, DesRoches guided the development of a new minor in global engineering leadership open to all Georgia Tech engineering undergraduates, doubled the number of named chairs/professors, led a strategic interdisciplinary research initiative, developed a Corporate Affiliates Program, and led a comprehensive strategic planning process. He also oversaw a $13.5 million renovation of the Jesse W. Mason Building, which was the main facility of the School of Civil and Environmental Engineering at the Georgia Institute of Technology. In 2014, he became Georgia Tech’s Faculty Athletics Representative, serving as the liaison between the Institute and the Athletics Association. As Faculty Athletics Representative, he worked closely with the Athletic Director and university leadership — including the president, provost, and senior vice provost for academic affairs — to formulate policies affecting intercollegiate athletics on campus. His responsibilities also include representing the Institute to the Atlantic Coast Conference and the National Collegiate Athletic Association. He was appointed to the Atlantic Coast Conference leadership team as vice president of the conference for the term of 2016–2017.

=== Rice University ===
Before his presidency at Rice University, DesRoches served as provost, the chief academic officer of Rice and its 7,500 students, eight schools and more than 700 faculty. He previously served as the William and Stephanie Sick Dean of Engineering at the George R. Brown School of Engineering at Rice. In this position, DesRoches provided leadership to a top-ranked engineering school with nine departments, 137 faculty and 2,500 students.

His research interests include the design of resilient infrastructure systems under extreme loads and the application of smart and auto-adaptive materials. He has published some 300 articles and delivered more than 100 presentations in 30 countries.

A fellow of the American Society of Civil Engineers and the society’s Structural Engineering Institute, DesRoches served as the key technical leader in the response of the United States to the 2010 Haiti earthquake, taking a team of 28 engineers, architects, city planners and social scientists to study the impact of the earthquake. He has participated in numerous congressional briefings to underscore the role university research plays in addressing the failing infrastructure in the U.S.and enhancing its resilience to natural hazards. DesRoches has served as thesis adviser to 30 doctoral candidates and 17 master’s students.

DesRoches chairs the Construction Safety Team Advisory Committee of the National Institute of Standards and Technology. He is also on the advisory board for the National Hazards Engineering Research Infrastructure. He previously served on the National Academies Resilient America Roundtable (RAR), the National Science Foundation’s Engineering Advisory Committee, and the Global Earthquake Modeling Scientific Board.

DesRoches has testified before U.S. House and Senate subcommittees on the science of earthquake resilience, and has participated in Washington, D.C. roundtables for media and congressional staffers on topics ranging from disaster preparedness to challenges for African-American men in STEM fields. National media outlets frequently contact him for expert analysis following earthquake events, including CNN, CNN International, LiveScience and National Geographic.

DesRoches received the Presidential Early Career Award for Scientists and Engineers in 2002 — the highest honor bestowed upon scientists and engineers early in their careers. He was a recipient of the 2015 American Society of Civil Engineers Charles Martin Duke Lifeline Earthquake Engineering Award, the Georgia Tech Outstanding Doctoral Thesis Adviser Award (2010), the 2007 ASCE Walter L. Huber Civil Engineering Research Prize, and the Georgia Tech ANAK Award (2008), the highest honor the undergraduate student body can bestow on a Georgia Tech faculty member. In 2019, he was a recipient of the Distinguished Arnold Kerr Lecturer Award. He gave the John A. Blume Distinguished Lecture in 2018 and that same year received the Earthquake Engineering Research Institute Distinguished Lecturer Award, one of the highest honors in the earthquake engineering field. in 2020, DesRoches was elected a member of the National Academy of Engineering.

On November 11, 2021, it was announced that DesRoches will be the president of Rice University, beginning on July 1, 2022.

== Notable awards and honors ==
- 2023 Elected in American Academy of Arts & Sciences
- 2020 National Academy of Engineering Member
- 2019 Outstanding TMS Paper Award (The Masonry Society)
- 2019 Arnold D. Kerr Distinguished Lecture
- 2018 Earthquake Engineering Research Institute Distinguished Lecturer Award
- 2018 John A. Blume Distinguished Lecturer, Stanford University
- 2016 Elected, Fellow, Structural Engineering Institute
- 2015 Elected, Fellow, American Society of Civil Engineers
- 2015 Inducted into UC Berkeley Civil & Environmental Engineering Academy of Distinguished Alumni
- 2015 American Society of Civil Engineers Charles Martin Duke Lifeline Earthquake Engineering Award
- 2012 Georgia Engineer of the Year in Education Award (Georgia Engineering Alliance)
- 2011 Richard Carroll Distinguished Lecturer, Johns Hopkins University
- 2010 Shah Family Fund Lecture, Stanford University
