= Gerald R. Dickens =

Gerald R. Dickens is Professor of Earth Science at Trinity College Dublin, and researches the history of the world’s oceans, with respect to the changing patterns of their geology, chemistry and biology.

'Jerry' Dickens's degrees are a PhD from the University of Michigan in Oceanography (1996), M.S. from the University of Michigan in Oceanography (1993), and a B.S. from the University of California, Davis 1989. Dickens was chief editor for several major earth science journals, notably Geology, and GSA Today, published by the Geological Society of America, but he was also past Editor in Chief of Paleoceanography. In 2013 and 2017 he became a fellow of the Geological Society of America and the American Geophysical Union.

Dickens was Lecturer and Senior Lecturer in the Department of Earth Sciences at James Cook University in Australia from 1997 to 2001. He was appointed an associate professor at Rice University in August 2001, becoming a full Professor in June 2008. Since 2020, he is the 1843 Chair of Geology at Trinity College Dublin. In 2003 Dickens was the 2002/2003 Distinguished Lecturer Award from the Joint Oceanographic Institutions, and in 2008 the Distinguished Lecturer Award of the American Association of Petroleum Geologists (AAPG). From 2005 to 2010, he served as Master of Martel College at Rice University. MBYM.

Dickens was interviewed for the BBC's Horizon documentary series in 2002 in a programme called 'The Day the Earth Nearly Died'. He was also interviewed on the History Channel's 'Mega Disasters' which focused on eruptions of methane gas deep in the ocean. The one-hour programme aired on October 9 and 10 2008. In the interview Dickens claimed that Methane had been identified as a cause for catastrophic disasters at the Paleocene-Eocene Thermal Maximum, about 55 million years ago.

== Selected publications ==
Dickens has authored or co-authored over 90 scientific papers including:

- Dickens, G.R. "The riddle of the clays." Nature Geoscience, 1 (2008): 86-88.
- Dickens, G.R. "Methane release from gas hydrates." Fire in the Ice, Summer (2008): 9-12.
- Dickens, G.R. & J.M. Francis "Comment: A case for a comet impact trigger for the Paleocene/Eocene thermal maximum and carbon isotope excursion." Earth and Planetary Science Letters (2004).
- Fielding, C.R., J.D. Trueman, Dickens, G.R., *M. Page "Response of a major river system to the last glacial cycle: geomorphology and internal architecture of the ancestral Burdekin River across the Great Barrier Reef shelf, northeast Australia." International Association of Sedimentologists Special Publication (2004).(In Press)
- Dickens, G.R. "Rethinking the global carbon cycle with a large, dynamic and microbially mediated gas hydrate capacitor." Earth and Planetary Science Letters (Frontiers), 213 (2003): 169-182.
- Dickens, G.R., D. Schroeder, K.U. Hinrichs & the Leg 201 Scientific Party "The pressure core sampler (PCS) on Ocean Drilling Program Leg 201: General operations and gas release." Initial Reports of the Ocean Drilling Program, 201 (2003).
- Dickens, G.R. "A methane trigger for rapid warming." Science, 299 (2003): 1017.
- Dickens, G.R., T. Fewless, E. Thomas & T.J. Bralower "Excess barite accumulation during the Paleocene/Eocene thermal maximum: Massive input of dissolved barium from seafloor gas hydrate reservoirs." Causes and Consequences of Globally Warm Climates in the Early Paleogene, Geological Society of America Special Publication, 369 (2003): 11-23.
- Dickens, G.R. "Data Report: Dissolved manganese concentrations in deep drill holes off New Zealand (ODP Leg 181)." Proceedings ODP, Scientific Reports, 181 (2002): http://www-odp.tamu.edu/publications/181_SR/202/20.
- Dickens, G.R. "Sulfate profiles and barium fronts in sediment on the Blake Ridge: Present and past methane fluxes through a large gas hydrate reservoir." Geochimica et Cosmochimica Acta, 65 (2001): 529-543.
- Dickens, G.R. "The potential volume of oceanic methane hydrates with variable external conditions." Organic Geochemistry, 32 (2001): 1179-1193.
- Dickens, G.R. "Carbon addition and removal during the late Paleocene thermal maximum: Basic theory with a preliminary treatment of the isotope record at Ocean Drilling Program Site 1051, Blake Nose." Western North Atlantic Palaeogene and Cretaceous Paleoceanography, Geological Society of London Special Publication, 183 (2001): 293-306.
- Dickens, G.R. "Modeling the global carbon cycle with a gas hydrate capacitor: Significance for the Latest Paleocene thermal maximum." Natural Gas Hydrates: Occurrence, Distribution and Detection, AGU Geophysical Monograph Series, 124 (2001): 19-38.
- Dickens, G, N. Exon, D. Holdway, Y. Lafoy, J-M Auzende, G. Dunbar & R. Summons "Quaternary sediment cores from the Southern Fairway Basin on the northern Lord Howe Rise (Tasman Sea)." Australian Geological Survey Organisation Record, 31 (2001): 29 pp..
