= Meeting Jesus at University =

2008 book by Edward Dutton

Meeting Jesus at University: Rites of Passage and Student Evangelicals
- Author: Edward Dutton
- Language: English
- Subject: Religious Studies
- Genre: Non-fiction
- Publisher: Ashgate Publishing
- Publication date: 2008
- Publication place: United Kingdom
- Pages: 168
- ISBN: 978-0-7546-6520-5

Meeting Jesus at University: Rites of Passage and Student Evangelicals is a 2008 book by the British author Edward Dutton. Dutton argues that Christian student groups provide a support structure during a transitional period in students' lives. According to Dutton, greater changes in students' lives are linked to greater differentiation between Christian student groups and outsiders.

The book describes six communities of Christian university students around the world. Dutton's methodology is based on Victor Turner's theory of liminality.

== Reception ==
The book was reviewed positively by John Sullivan in The Heythrop Journal, who said it was "clear [and] carefully argued". A review in the Church Times said it offered "careful analysis" and "has important guidance to offer to those who minister".

However, a review by Beth Maclay Doriani in Religious Studies Review found it to be "limited by dependence on one particular model". A review by Chris Williams in the International Journal of Christianity and Education described the analysis as "vaguely old-fashioned... [drawing] heavily on anthropological theory from the 1970s". Writing in the Journal of Contemporary Religion, Mathew Guest found "the presentation of Turner's work is rather simplistic... Dutton's model of liminality and communitas is so broad that it is difficult to imagine what might serve as counter-evidence to his argument."
