= Rice University School of Social Sciences =

Academic school at Rice University, US

Coordinates: 29.7166°N 95.4027°W

School of Social Sciences
- Type: Private
- Dean: Rachel Kimbro
- Location: Houston, Texas, USA
- Website: https://socialsciences.rice.edu/

Rice School of Social Sciences is an academic school on the Rice University campus. It serves the largest number of undergraduates, with over a third of Rice undergraduates choosing a major in the social sciences. It is composed of seven departments: anthropology, economics, linguistics, political science, psychology, sociology, and sport management, and it hosts the interdisciplinary undergraduate cognitive sciences program. At the graduate level, five of the seven departments have Ph.D. programs. Each program concentrates on selected areas for education and research. The School of Social Sciences also offers professional master's programs in Energy Economics, Human Factors & Human Computer Interaction, Global Affairs, Industrial & Organizational Psychology, and Social Policy Evaluation.

Rachel Tolbert Kimbro currently serves as the Dean of Social Sciences. Former deans include Susan McIntosh (interim, 2019–2021), Antonio Merlo (2016–2019), Lyn Ragsdale (2007–2016), Robert Stein (1996–2007), James Pomerantz (1988–1996), and Joseph Cooper (1979–1988).

== Facilities ==
The School of Social Sciences opened its new headquarters, Kraft Hall, in February 2020, in conjunction with its 40th anniversary. The 78,000 square-foot Patricia Lipoma Kraft and Jonathan A. Kraft Hall for Social Sciences is named for Patti and Jonathan Kraft, the lead donors for the project. It houses nearly 250 faculty, staff, and graduate students and includes a large Dean's Suite and meeting facilities. The Economics and Sociology Departments, and research institutes including the Kinder Institute for Urban Research; the Houston Education Research Consortium; the Texas Policy Lab; Religion and Public Life program and the Boniuk Institute for Religious Tolerance are all housed in the new building. The School is fundraising now to build a second building.

The School of Social Sciences also occupies other buildings on campus include Sewall Hall, Herzstein Hall, Herring Hall, Tudor Field House, and the Biosciences Research Collaborative.
