= Sammy the Owl =

University Mascot

Sammy the Owl is the official mascot for the Rice Owls of Rice University.

== History ==
An early symbol of Rice's athletic teams was a large canvas owl, a tempting target for Rice Institute's rivals. In 1917, when students from Southwest Conference football rival Texas A&M kidnapped the owl, Rice students pooled their resources and hired a private detective to go to College Station to find the missing mascot. Upon recovering the owl, the detective sent a coded telegram to Houston that read "Sammy is fairly well and would like to see his parents at eleven o'clock," giving the mascot a name for the first time.

Eventually, the canvas representation of Sammy was replaced with a live owl. During this period, handlers kept Sammy in a roost in front of Lovett College. Prior to football games, Sammy was known to fly into the stadium.

Rice University later discontinued its tradition of a live owl, replacing it with a student dressed in an owl suit. As such, Sammy the Owl is an elected position of the Rice University Student Body.

=== Notable events ===
- 1917 - Canvas depiction of Rice Owl stolen by students from Texas A&M. Mascot is recovered and given name Sammy.
- 2004 - Sammy the Owl is featured in Playboy Magazine's story on College Mascots

== Other appearances ==
Sammy the Owl has also served as the image of Rice athletics for many years. Past images have depicted Sammy as wearing a sailor hat. In 1995, the image of the owl swooping in behind the university's name replaced old images of Sammy.

The Rice Thresher awards its annual "Sammies" to the best performances in Rice theater. These awards are given by the Thresher staff without consultation with the mascot but use his name nonetheless. Remarkably, Greg Meeks, Sammy the Owl, 1991-1992 also won a Sammie best actor award for his performance as Richard the Lionheart in 1992.

Sammy the Owl is also the mascot of a fictional high school in the movie Rushmore, filmed in Houston.

== Debates Surrounding Sammy ==
Sammy the Owl is elected annually during the Rice University Student Association's spring election. This practice, however, has been debated since the mid-1990s. In 1995, following an incident during the Rice-Texas A&M football game, the question of who should be responsible for Sammy the Owl was raised. Following much debate, it was decided that Sammy would remain an elected student, but would be formally accountable to the athletics department.
