= Religious Studies Review =

- Discipline: Religion
- Language: English
- Edited by: David B. Gray and Jeremy Biles

Publication details
- History: 1975-present
- Publisher: Wiley-Blackwell for the Rice University School of Humanities
- Frequency: Quarterly

Standard abbreviations
- ISO 4: Relig. Stud. Rev.

Indexing
- ISSN: 0319-485X (print); 1748-0922 (web)
- OCLC no.: 1682754

Links
- Journal homepage; Religious Studies Review at Rice University School of Humanities

Religious Studies Review (RSR) is the journal of the Council of Societies for the Study of Religion (CSSR), which is based at Rice University. The journal is published quarterly by John Wiley & Sons. RSR reviews over 1,000 titles annually in review essays and critical notes.

== History ==
RSR was wholly produced and distributed by the CSSR until 2005 when they contracted Wiley-Blackwell to manage it. In 2009, Rice University purchased RSR, while Wiley-Blackwell continued the publishing duties.
