= Rice University School of Humanities =

Coordinates: 29.7175°N 95.3997°W

The School of Humanities at Rice University in Houston, Texas allows students to choose from ten academic departments including art history, classical studies, English, French studies, German studies, Hispanic studies, history, philosophy, religious studies, and visual and dramatic arts. Several interdisciplinary majors are also available, such as foci on women, gender and sexuality; Asian studies; ancient Mediterranean civilizations; and medieval and early modern studies. The school is home to six national journals: SEL: Studies in English Literature 1500–1900 the Journal of Southern History, the Journal of Feminist Economics, Papers of Jefferson Davis, the Religious Studies Review, and the Council of Societies for the Study of Religion Bulletin. The Humanities Building opened in 2000.

Members of the Rice humanities faculty have been named the Carnegie National Professor of the Year and the Carnegie Texas Professor of the Year.

In 1981 33% of Rice students studied foreign languages. In 1986 this increased to 40%. In the northern hemisphere fall of 1986 Rice added the Chinese language to its curriculum.
