= Rice University =

Private university in Houston, Texas, US

William Marsh Rice University
- Former names: William M. Rice Institute for the Advancement of Literature, Science and Art (1912–1960)
- Motto: "Letters, Science, Art"
- Type: Private research university
- Established: September 23, 1912; 114 years ago
- Accreditation: SACS
- Academic affiliations: AAU; COFHE; NAICU; ORAU; URA; space-grant
- Endowment: $8.07 billion (FY2024)
- Budget: $1.09 billion (FY2025)
- President: Reginald DesRoches
- Faculty: 855 full-time (fall 2024)
- Administrative staff: 2,152
- Students: 8,880 (fall 2024)
- Undergraduates: 4,776 (fall 2024)
- Postgraduates: 4,104 (fall 2024)
- Location: Houston, Texas, United States; 29°43′1″N 95°24′10″W
- Campus: 300 acres (120 ha); Large city
- Newspaper: The Rice Thresher
- Colors: Blue and gray
- Nickname: Owls
- Sporting affiliations: NCAA Division I FBS – American
- Mascot: Sammy the Owl
- Website: rice.edu

William Marsh Rice University, also known as Rice University, is a private research university in Houston, Texas, United States. Established in 1912, it spans 300 acres. The university consists of eight constituent schools in the fields of architecture, business, continuing studies, engineering, humanities, music, natural sciences, and social sciences.

Established in 1912 as William M. Rice Institute for the Advancement of Literature, Science and Art after the murder of its namesake William Marsh Rice, Rice has been a member of the Association of American Universities since 1985 and is classified among "R1: Doctoral Universities – Very high research activity". Rice competes in 14 NCAA Division I varsity sports and is a part of the American Conference. Its teams are called the Rice Owls.

The alumni include 26 Marshall Scholars, 13 Rhodes Scholars, 7 Churchill Scholars, and 3 Nobel laureates.

== History ==
=== Background ===
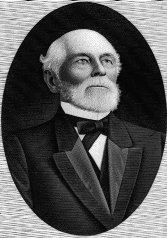
William Marsh Rice's estate funded the establishment of the Rice Institute.

Rice University's history began with the death of Massachusetts businessman William Marsh Rice, who had made his fortune in real estate, railroad development and cotton trading in Texas. In 1891, Rice decided to charter a free-tuition educational institute in Houston, bearing his name, to be created upon his death, earmarking most of his estate towards funding the project. Rice's will specified the institution was to be "a competitive institution of the highest grade" and that only white students would be permitted to attend.

On the morning of September 23, 1900, Rice, age 84, was found dead by his valet, Charles F. Jones, and was presumed to have died in his sleep. Shortly thereafter, a large check made out to Rice's New York City lawyer, signed by the late Rice, aroused the suspicion of a bank teller, due to the misspelling of the recipient's name. The lawyer, Albert T. Patrick, then claimed that Rice had changed his will to leave the bulk of his fortune to Patrick, rather than to the creation of Rice's educational institute.

A subsequent investigation led by the district attorney of New York resulted in the arrests of Patrick and of Rice's butler and valet Charles F. Jones, who had been persuaded to administer chloroform to Rice while he slept. Rice's friend and personal lawyer in Houston, Captain James A. Baker, aided in the discovery of what turned out to be a fake will with a forged signature. Jones was not prosecuted since he cooperated with the district attorney, and testified against Patrick. Patrick was found guilty of conspiring to steal Rice's fortune and he was convicted of murder in 1901 (he was pardoned in 1912 due to conflicting medical testimony).

Baker helped Rice's estate direct the fortune, worth $4.6 million in 1904 (equivalent to $129 million in 2025), towards the founding of what was to be called the Rice Institute, later to become Rice University. The board took control of the assets on April 29 of that year.

In 1907, the board of trustees selected the head of the Department of Mathematics and Astronomy at Princeton University, Edgar Odell Lovett, to head the institute, which was still in the planning stages. He came recommended by Princeton's president, Woodrow Wilson. In 1908, Lovett accepted the challenge, and was formally inaugurated as the institute's first president on October 12, 1912.

Lovett undertook extensive research before formalizing plans for the new institute, including visits to 78 institutions of higher learning across the world on a long tour between 1908 and 1909. He was impressed by the aesthetic beauty of the uniformity of the architecture at the University of Pennsylvania, a theme which was adopted by the institute, as well as the residential college system at Cambridge University, which was added to the institute several decades later. Lovett called for the establishment of a university "of the highest grade," "an institution of liberal and technical learning" devoted "quite as much to investigation as to instruction." [We must] "keep the standards up and the numbers down," declared Lovett. "The most distinguished teachers must take their part in undergraduate teaching, and their spirit should dominate it all."

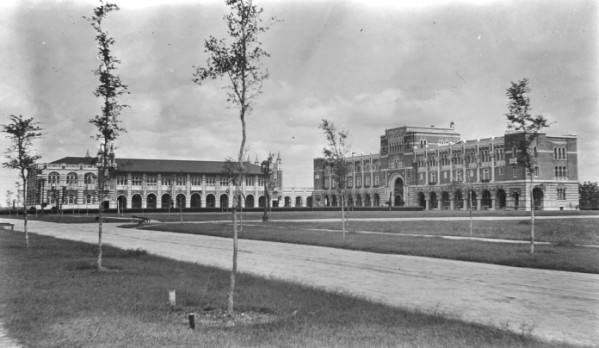
Rice University

=== Establishment and growth ===
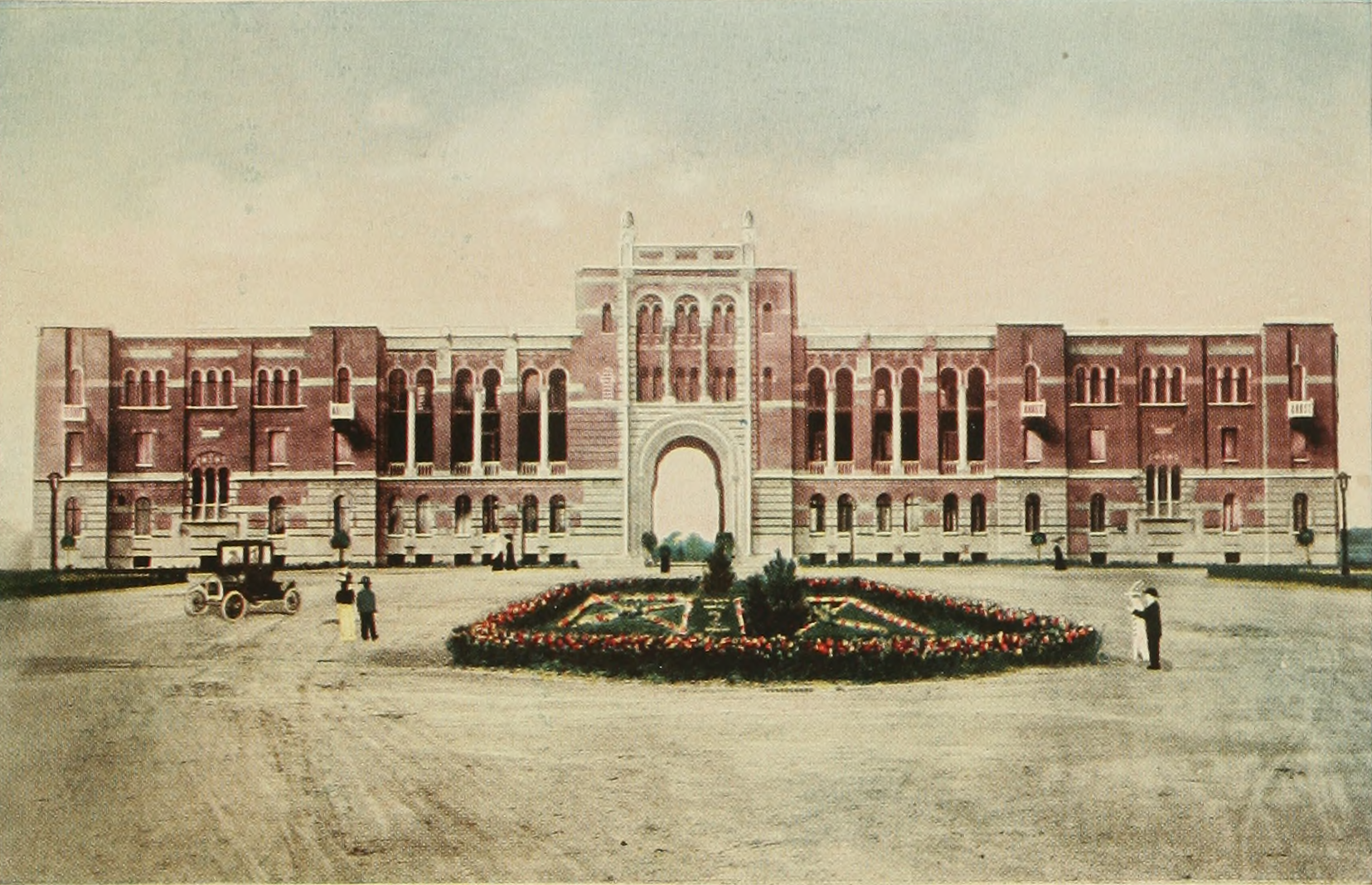
An illustration of the Administration Building of Rice University in 1913

In 1911, the cornerstone was laid for the institute's first building, the Administration Building, now known as Lovett Hall in honor of the founding president. On September 23, 1912, the 12th anniversary of William Marsh Rice's murder, the William Marsh Rice Institute for the Advancement of Letters, Science, and Art began coursework with 59 enrolled students, who were known as the "59 immortals," and about a dozen faculty. After 18 additional students joined later, Rice's initial class numbered 77, 48 male and 29 female. Rice accepted coeducational admissions from its beginning, but on-campus housing would not become co-ed until 1957.

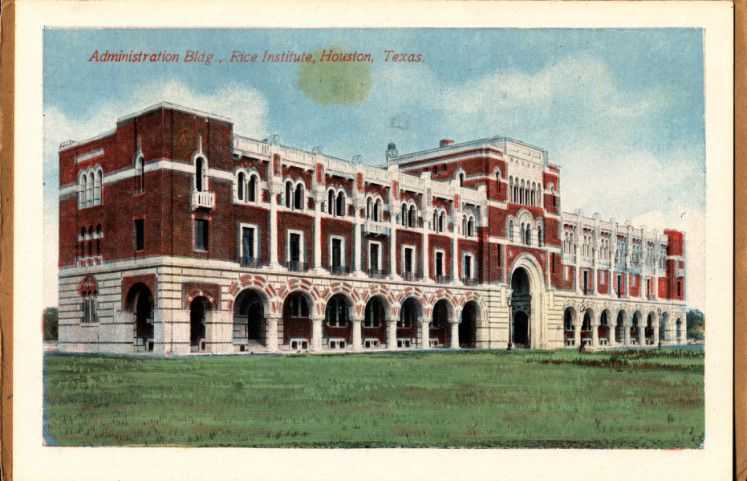
Administration Building, Rice Institute, Houston, Texas (postcard, circa 1912–1924)

Per William Marsh Rice's will and Rice Institute's initial charter, the students paid no tuition. Classes were difficult, however, and about half of Rice's students had failed after the first 1912 term. At its first commencement ceremony, held on June 12, 1916, Rice awarded 35 bachelor's degrees and one master's degree. That year, the student body also voted to adopt the § Honor System, which still exists today. The first Ph.D. was awarded in 1918 in mathematics.

In the 1920s, many of the university's early students were active supporters of the Ku Klux Klan, with a 1922 yearbook showing approximately twenty students wearing Klan robes in a posed photograph. President David Leebron reacted to the re-circulation of these images in 2019 by stating that "It is unsurprising but nonetheless deeply disturbing that racist imagery, including students in blackface and KKK outfits, appeared at Rice with some frequency during the years prior to the admission of black students." In 1923, a Ku Klux Klan event was held on a Rice-owned Louisiana Street location, near to the home of a Black woman who had filed a lawsuit against the institute in 1909.

The Founder's Memorial Statue, a bronze statue of a seated William Marsh Rice, holding the original plans for the campus, was dedicated in 1930, and installed in the central academic quad, facing Lovett Hall. The statue was crafted by John Angel. In 2020, Rice students petitioned the university to take down the statue due to the founder's history as a slave owner. In January 2022, the board of trustees announced plans to relocate the statue within the academic quadrangle. In November 2023, the statue along with its plinth were taken down in conjunction with a renovation of the Academic Quad, and eventually were relocated to a different location in the Quad.

During World War II, Rice Institute was one of 131 colleges and universities nationally that took part in the V-12 Navy College Training Program, which offered students a path to a Navy commission.

The residential college system proposed by President Lovett was adopted in 1958, with the East Hall residence becoming Baker College, South Hall residence becoming Will Rice College, West Hall becoming Hanszen College, and the temporary Wiess Hall becoming Wiess College.

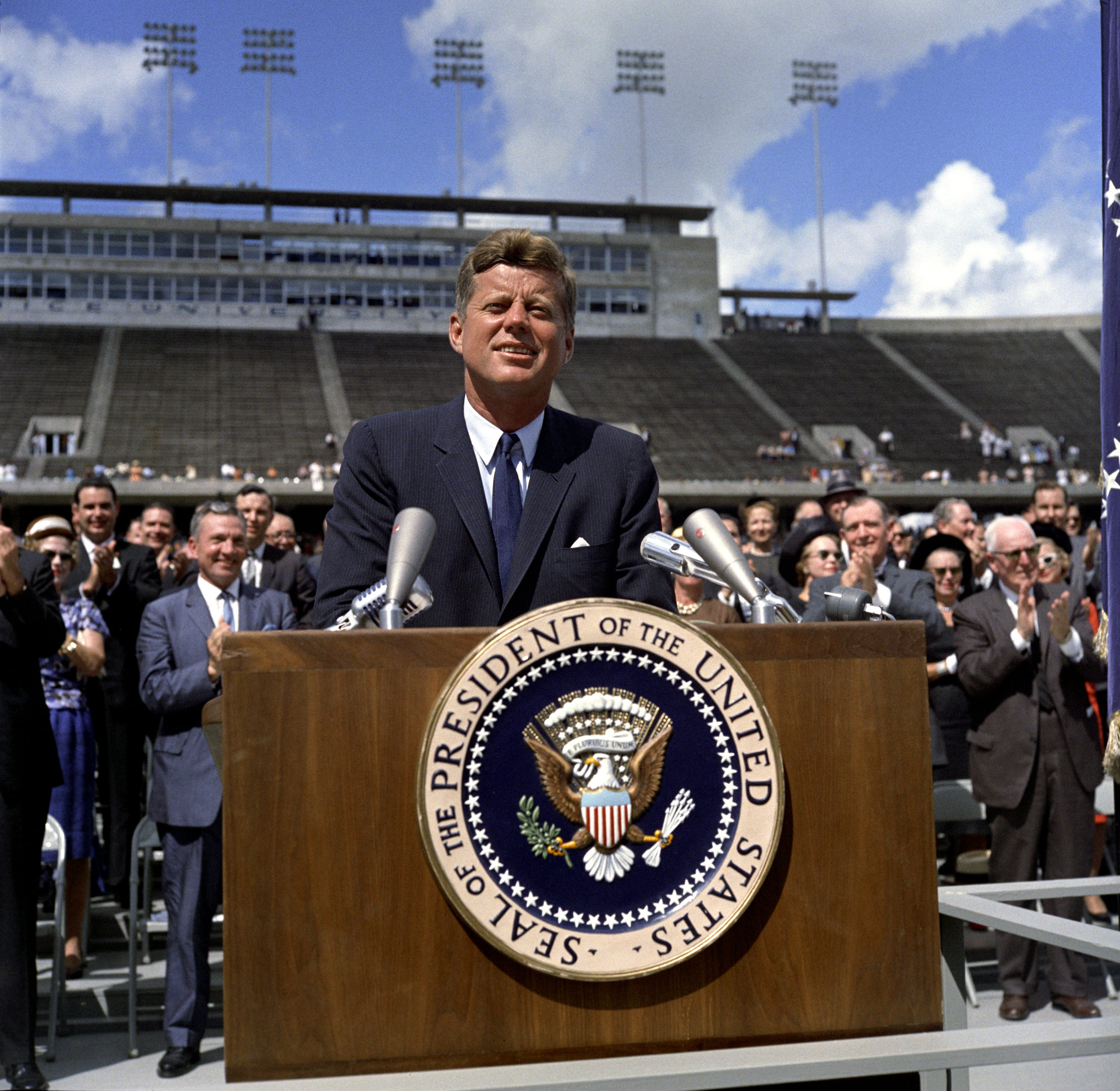
John F. Kennedy speaking at Rice Stadium in 1962

In 1959, the Rice Institute Computer went online. 1960 saw Rice Institute formally renamed William Marsh Rice University. Rice acted as a temporary intermediary in the transfer of land between Humble Oil and Refining Company and NASA, for the creation of NASA's Manned Spacecraft Center (now called Johnson Space Center) in 1962. President John F. Kennedy then gave a speech at Rice Stadium reiterating that the United States intended to reach the Moon before the end of the decade of the 1960s, and "to become the world's leading space-faring nation". The Rice Space Institute has collaborated with the Johnson Space Center for more than 50 years.

The original charter of Rice Institute dictated that the university admit and educate, tuition-free, "the white inhabitants of Houston, and the state of Texas". In 1963, the governing board of Rice University filed a lawsuit to allow the university to modify its charter to admit students of all races and to charge tuition. Ph.D. student Raymond Johnson became the first black Rice student when he was admitted that year. In 1964, Rice officially amended the university charter to desegregate its graduate and undergraduate divisions. The Trustees of Rice University prevailed in a lawsuit to void the racial language in the trust in 1966. Rice began charging tuition for the first time in 1965. In the same year, Rice launched a $33-million development campaign (equivalent to $257 million in 2025). $43 million ($275 million) was raised by its conclusion in 1970. In 1974, two new schools were founded at Rice, the Jesse H. Jones Graduate School of Management and the Shepherd School of Music. The Brown Foundation Challenge, a fund-raising program designed to encourage annual gifts, was launched in 1976 and ended in 1996 having raised $185 million ($350 million). The Rice School of Social Sciences was founded in 1979.

On-campus housing was exclusively for men for the first forty years, until 1957. Jones College was the first women's residence on the Rice campus, followed by Brown College. According to legend, the women's colleges were purposefully situated at the opposite end of campus from the existing men's colleges as a way of preserving campus propriety, which was greatly valued by Edgar Odell Lovett, who did not even allow benches to be installed on campus, fearing that they "might lead to co-fraternization of the sexes". The path linking the north colleges to the center of campus was given the tongue-in-cheek name of "Virgin's Walk". Individual colleges became coeducational between 1973 and 1987, with the single-sex floors of colleges that had them becoming co-ed by 2006. By then, several new residential colleges had been built on campus to handle the university's growth, including Lovett College, Sid Richardson College, and Martel College.

=== Late twentieth and early twenty-first century ===
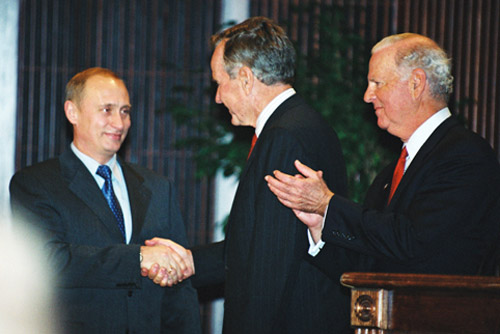
George H. W. Bush meeting Vladimir Putin at Rice in 2001

The Economic Summit of Industrialized Nations was held at Rice in 1990. Three years later, in 1993, the James A. Baker III Institute for Public Policy was created. In 1997, the Edythe Bates Old Grand Organ and Recital Hall and the Center for Nanoscale Science and Technology, renamed in 2005 for the late Nobel Prize winner and Rice professor Richard E. Smalley, were dedicated at Rice. In 1999, the Center for Biological and Environmental Nanotechnology was created. The Rice Owls baseball team was ranked #1 in the nation for the first time in that year (1999), holding the top spot for eight weeks.

In 2003, the Owls won their first national championship in baseball, which was the first for the university in any team sport, beating Southwest Missouri State in the opening game and then the University of Texas and Stanford University twice each en route to the title. In 2008, President David Leebron issued a ten-point plan titled "Vision for the Second Century" outlining plans to increase research funding, strengthen existing programs, and increase collaboration. The plan has brought about another wave of campus constructions, including the newly renamed BioScience Research Collaborative building (intended to foster collaboration with the adjacent Texas Medical Center), a new recreational center and the renovated Autry Court basketball stadium, and the addition of two new residential colleges, Duncan College and McMurtry College.

Beginning in late 2008, the university considered a merger with Baylor College of Medicine, though the merger was ultimately rejected in 2010. Select Rice undergraduates were guaranteed admission to Baylor College of Medicine upon graduation as part of the Rice/Baylor BS/MD Medical Scholars program, until the termination of the program in 2022.

In 2018, the university added an online MBA program, MBA@Rice.

In June 2019, the university's president announced plans for a task force on Rice's "past in relation to slave history and racial injustice", stating that "Rice has some historical connections to that terrible part of American history and the segregation and racial disparities that resulted directly from it".

In 2021, President Leebron decided to pursue a development agreement with the City of Houston in response to requests from community members and Rice students regarding the Rice Innovation District. This decision was made instead of implementing a community benefits agreement, which had been suggested by the community. Typically, community benefits agreements involve a community coalition as a signatory, but the proposed agreement with the City of Houston will not include such a coalition.

In 2025, the university announced the establishment of the 12th residential college, Chao College. The new residential college is built on the grounds of the old Sid Richardson building and is named after Ting Tsung Chao and Wei Fong Chao, Texan entrepreneurs and billionaires. Funds originally intended to establish the 13th residential college were instead utilized towards the development of a new building to house Lovett College.

== Campus ==
Located near the city of West University Place, Rice University's campus covers a 285-acre (115 ha) area within Houston's museum district and is heavily wooded.

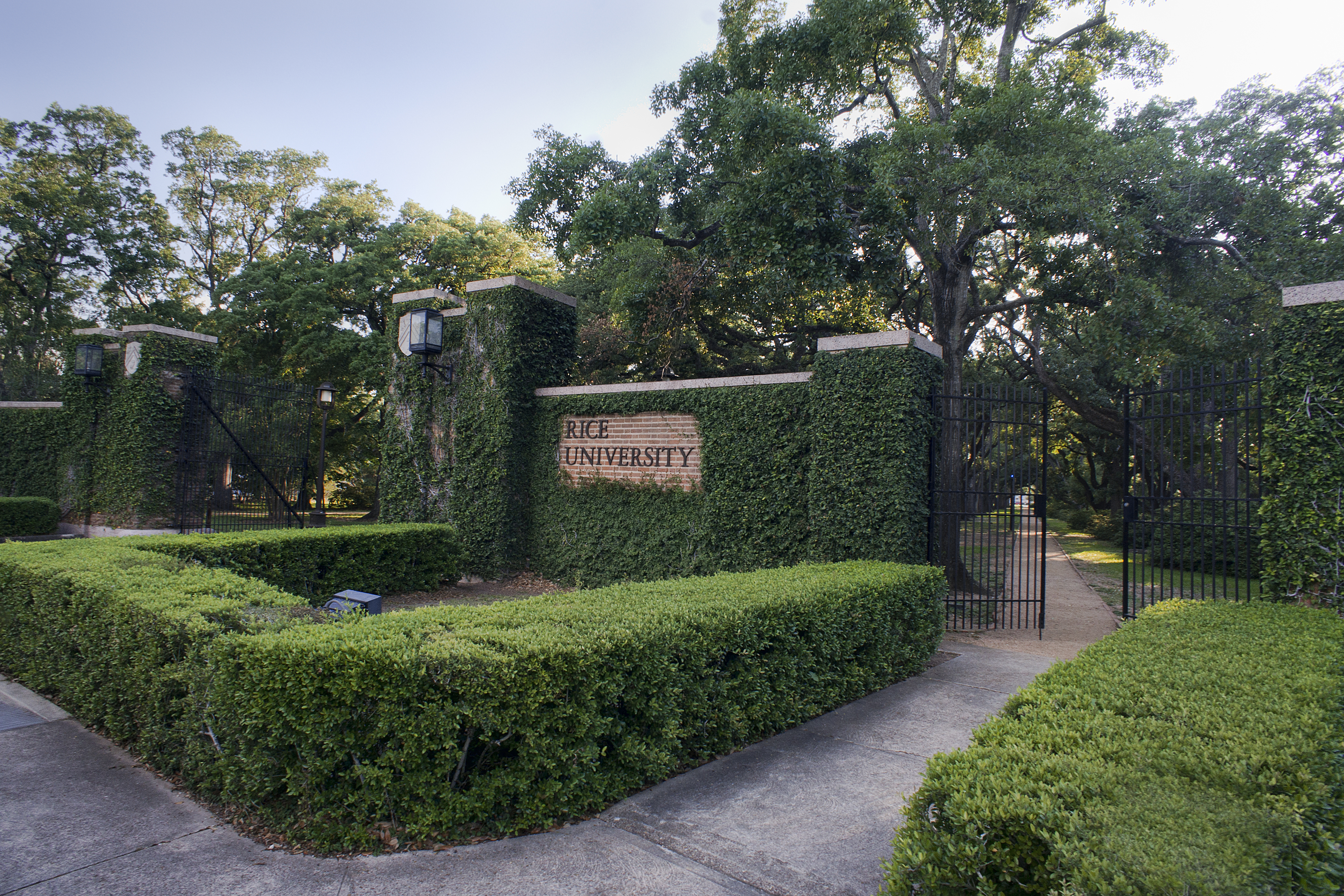
The main entrance to Rice University

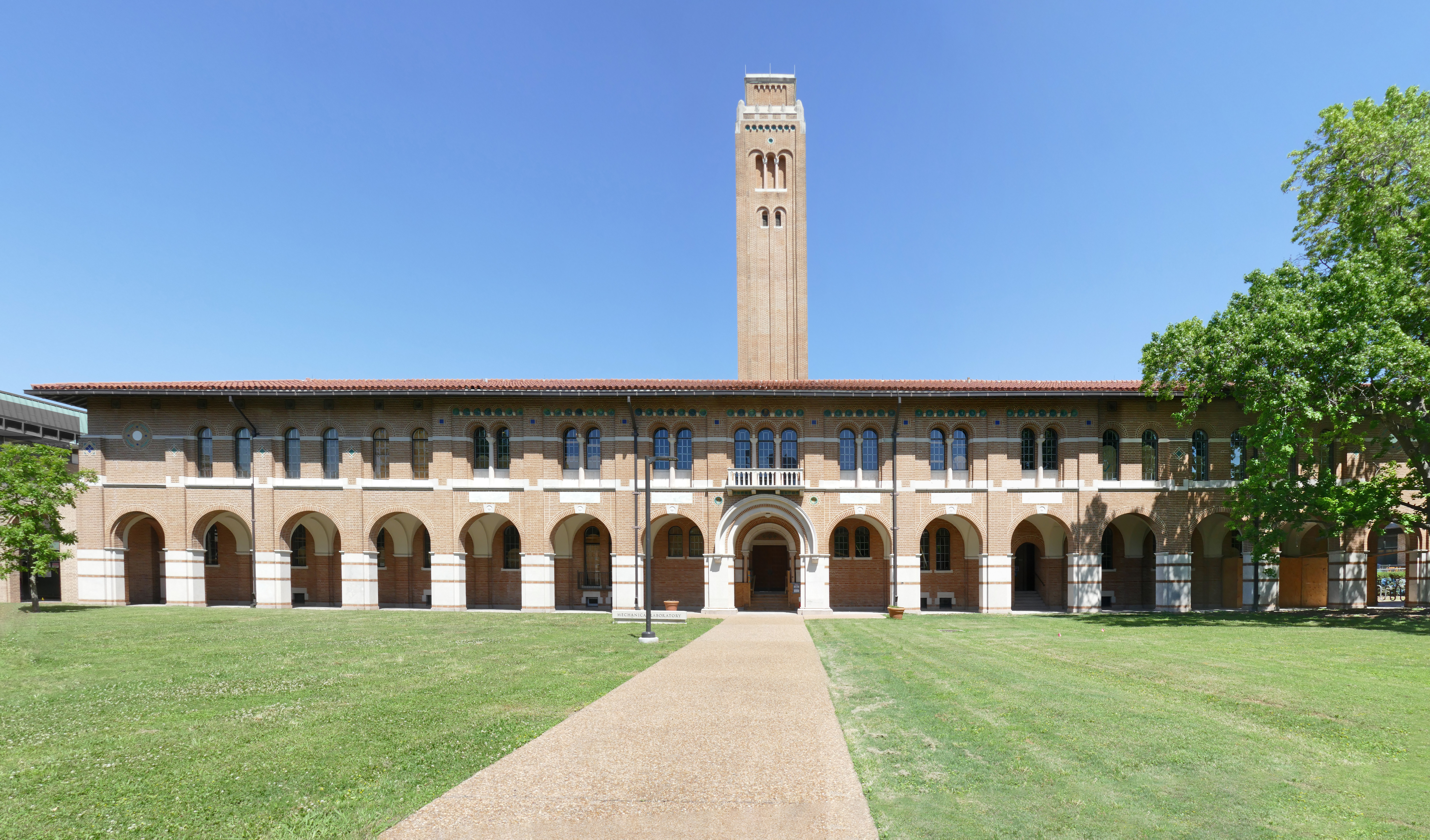
Rice University Mechanical Laboratory and Power House. The second building on campus.

The campus is bounded by five streets: Greenbriar Street, Rice Boulevard, Sunset Boulevard, Main Street, and University Boulevard. Throughout its history, Rice University's buildings have been situated within this "outer loop." However, in recent times, new facilities have been constructed in proximity to the campus. Despite this, most of the academic, administrative, and residential structures are still situated within the original pentagonal area. Some off-campus buildings include the Collaborative Research Center, graduate student housing, the Greenbriar building, and the Wiess President's House.

A stone bench in the Academic Quad

Rice University's campus houses around 50 buildings that are dispersed between the main entrance located at its easternmost corner and the parking lots and First Community Stadium situated at the western end. The Lynn R. Lowrey Arboretum, consisting of more than 4000 trees and shrubs is spread throughout the campus.

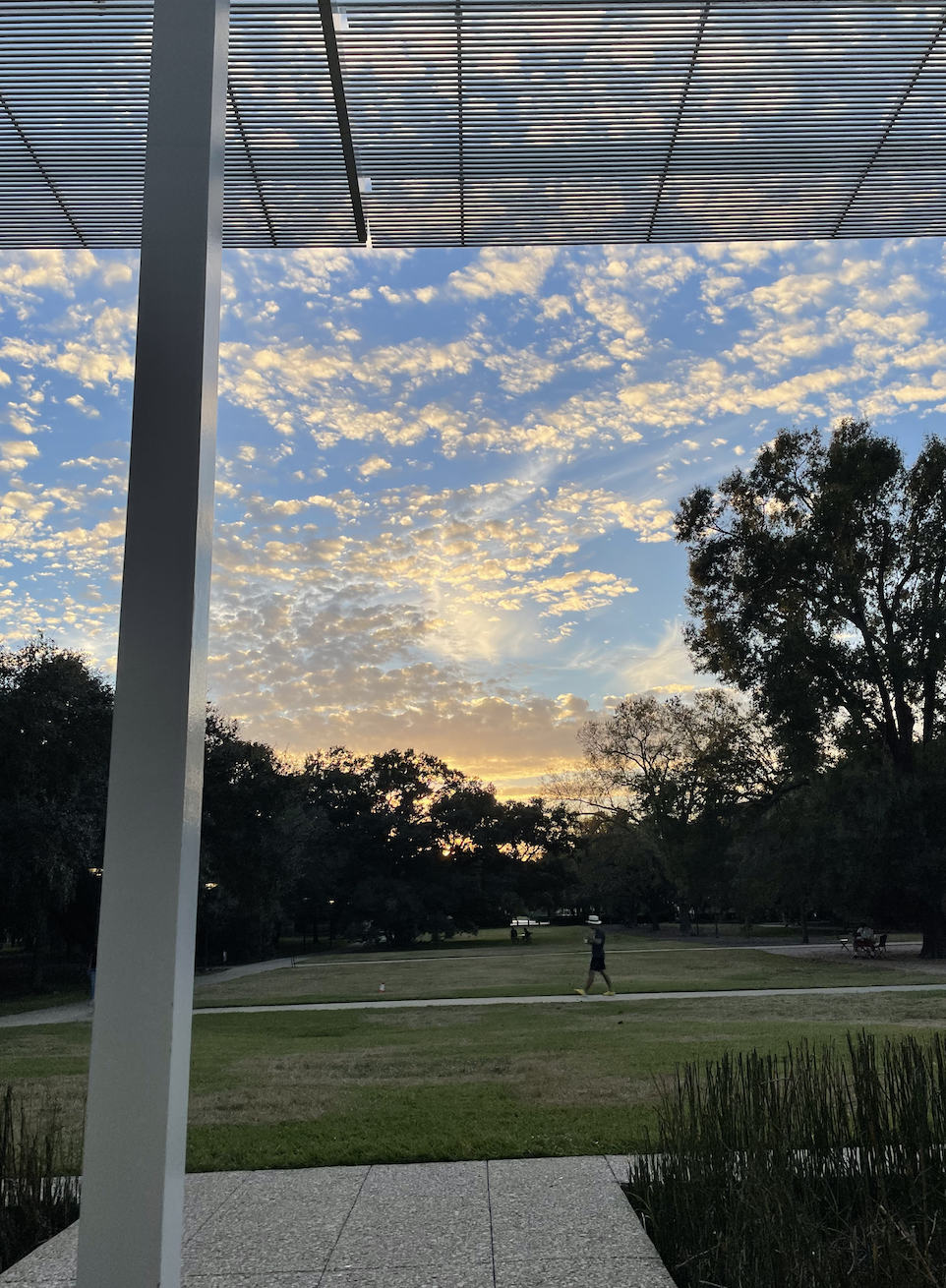
View of Rice campus outside Brochstein Pavilion

The university's first president, Edgar Odell Lovett, intended for the campus to have a uniform architecture style to improve its aesthetic appeal. Nearly every building on campus is noticeably Byzantine in style, with sand and pink-colored bricks, large archways and columns being a common theme among many campus buildings.

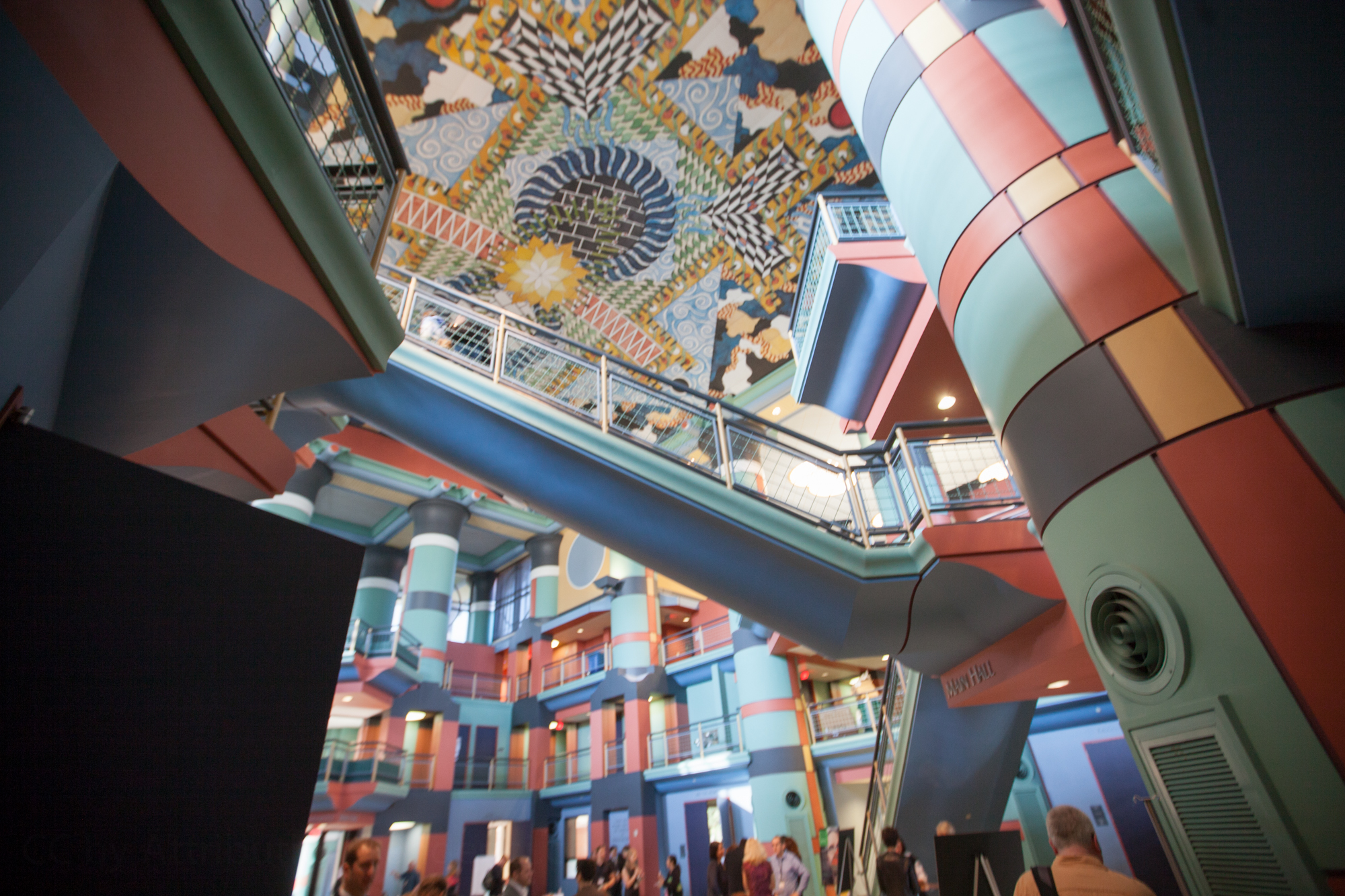
Duncan Hall is Rice's hub for engineering and computation.

Lovett Hall, named for Rice's first president, is the university's landmark building. Through its Sallyport arch, new students symbolically enter the university during matriculation and depart as graduates at commencement. Duncan Hall, Rice's computational engineering building, was designed to encourage collaboration between the four different departments situated there. The building's foyer, drawn from many world cultures, was designed by the architect to symbolically express this collaborative purpose.

The campus is organized in a number of quadrangles. The Academic Quad, anchored by a statue of founder William Marsh Rice, includes Ralph Adams Cram's masterpiece, the asymmetrical Lovett Hall, the original administrative building; Fondren Library; Herzstein Hall, the original physics building and home to the largest amphitheater on campus; Sewall Hall for the social sciences and arts; Rayzor Hall for the languages; and Anderson Hall of the Architecture department. The Humanities Building, winner of several architectural awards, is immediately adjacent to the main quad. Further west lies a quad surrounded by McNair Hall of the Jones Business School, the Baker Institute, and Alice Pratt Brown Hall of the Shepherd School of Music. These two quads are surrounded by the university's main access road, a one-way loop referred to as the "inner loop". In the Engineering Quad, a trinity of sculptures by Michael Heizer, collectively entitled 45 Degrees, 90 Degrees, 180 Degrees, are flanked by Abercrombie Laboratory, the Cox Building, and the Mechanical Laboratory, housing the Electrical, Mechanical, and Earth Science/Civil Engineering departments, respectively. Duncan Hall is the latest addition to this quad, providing new offices for the Computer Science, Computational and Applied Math, Electrical and Computer Engineering, and Statistics departments.

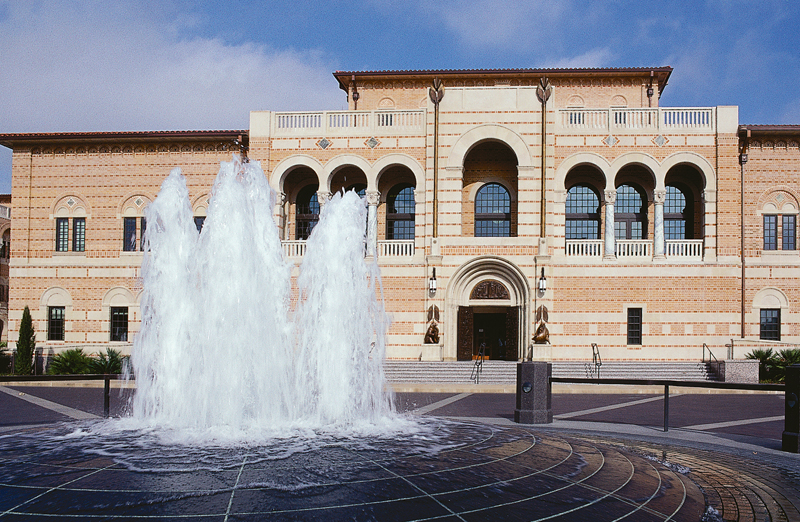
McNair Hall, home to the Jones School of Business

Roughly three-quarters of Rice's undergraduate population lives on campus. Housing is divided among eleven residential colleges. The colleges are named for university historical figures and benefactors. Five colleges, McMurtry, Duncan, Martel, Jones, and Brown are located on the north side of campus, across from the "South Colleges", Baker, Will Rice, Lovett, Hanszen, Sid Richardson, and Wiess, on the other side of the Academic Quadrangle. Of the eleven colleges, Baker is the oldest, originally built in 1912, and Chao is the newest, which opened for the first time for the 2026-27 school year. Will Rice, Baker, and Lovett colleges are undergoing renovation to expand their dining facilities as well as the number of rooms available for students.

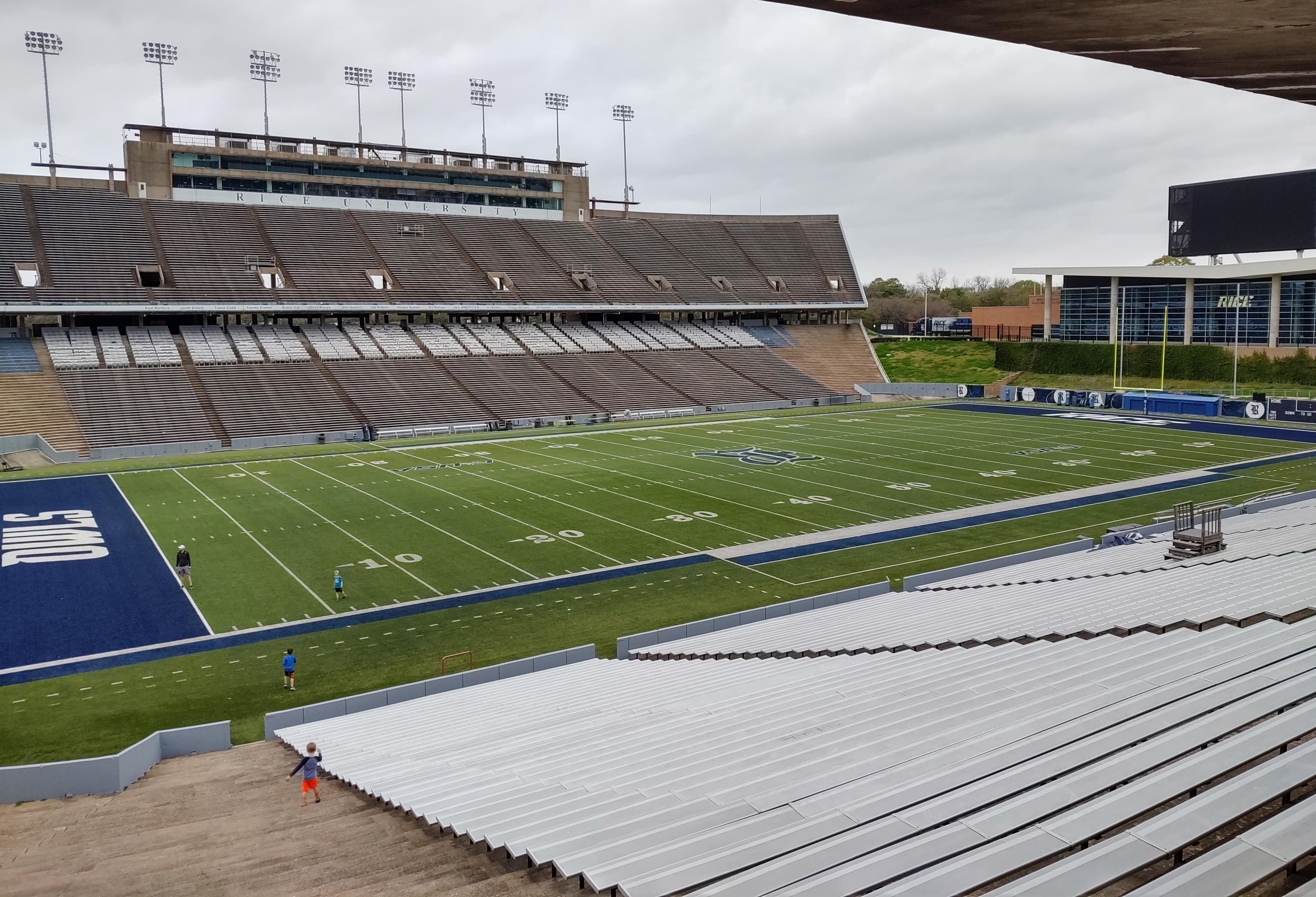
Rice University's football stadium

The on-campus football facility, First Community Stadium, opened in 1950 with a capacity of 70,000 seats. After improvements in 2006, the stadium is currently configured to seat 47,000 for football but can readily be reconfigured to its original capacity of 70,000. The stadium was the site of Super Bowl VIII and a speech by John F. Kennedy on September 12, 1962, in which he challenged the nation to send a man to the moon by the end of the decade. The recently renovated Tudor Fieldhouse, formerly known as Autry Court, is home to the basketball and volleyball teams. Other stadia include the Rice Track/Soccer Stadium and the Jake Hess Tennis Stadium. A new Rec Center now houses the intramural sports offices and provide an outdoor pool, training and exercise facilities for all Rice students, while athletics training will solely be held at Tudor Fieldhouse and the Rice Football Stadium.

=== Innovation District ===
In early 2019, Rice announced the site where the abandoned Sears building in Midtown Houston stood, along with its surrounding area, would be transformed into "The Ion," the hub of the 16-acre (6.5 ha) South Main Innovation District. President David Leebron stated, "We chose the name Ion because it's from the Greek ienai, which means 'go'. We see it as embodying the ever-forward motion of discovery, the spark at the center of a truly original idea. It also represents the last three letters in many of the words that define the building's mission, like inspiration, creation, acceleration and innovation."

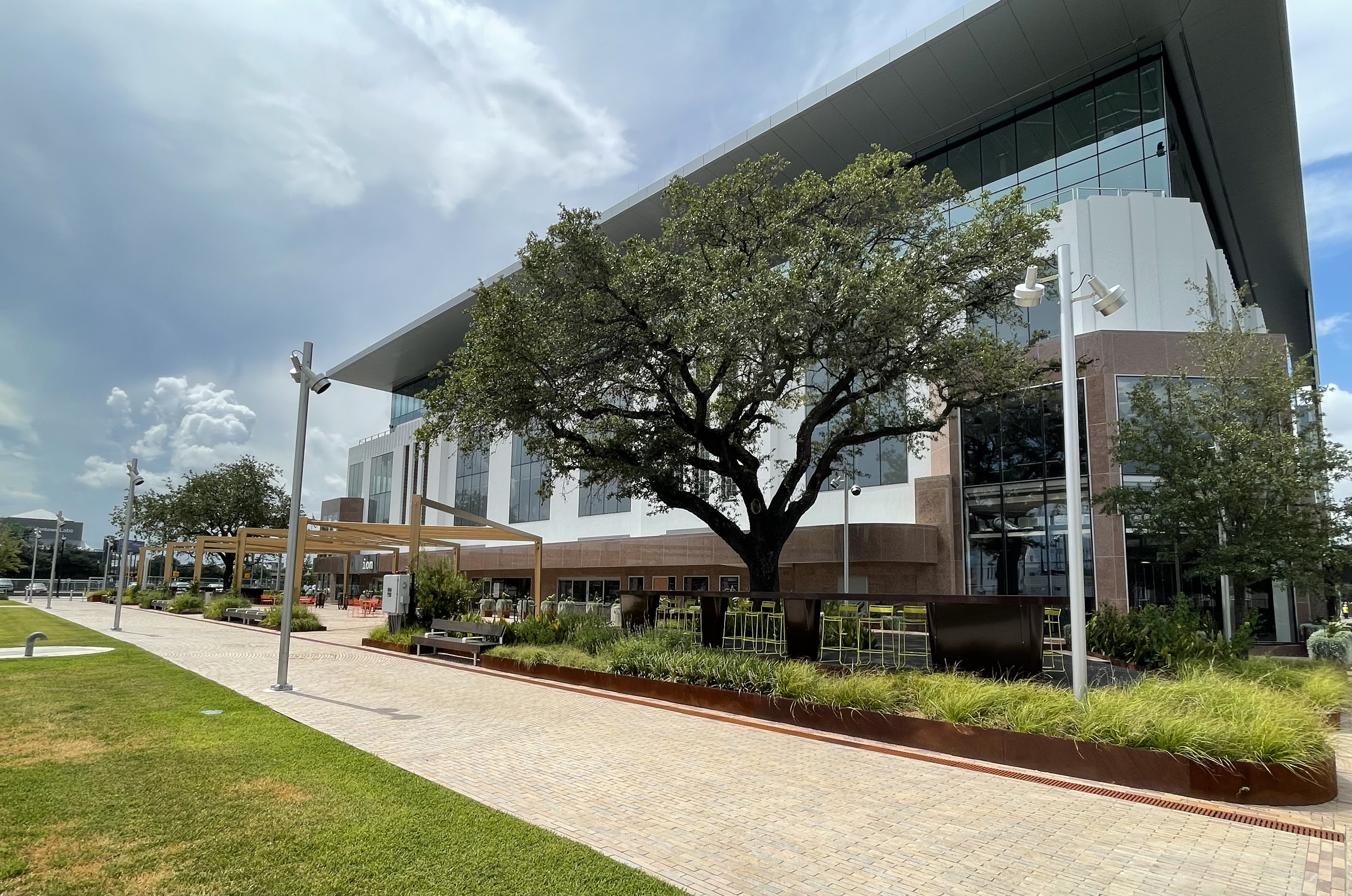
The Ion building under construction in the Rice Innovation District

Students of Rice and other Houston-area colleges and universities making up the Student Coalition for a Just and Equitable Innovation Corridor are advocating for a community benefits agreement (CBA), a contractual agreement between a developer and a community coalition. Residents of neighboring Third Ward and other members of the Houston Coalition for Equitable Development Without Displacement (HCEDD) have faced consistent opposition from the City of Houston and Rice Management Company to a CBA as traditionally defined, in favor of an agreement between the latter two entities without a community coalition signatory.

== Organization ==
Rice University is chartered as a non-profit organization and is governed by a privately appointed board of trustees. The board consists of a maximum of 25 voting members who serve four-year terms. The trustees serve without compensation and a simple majority of trustees must reside in Texas, including at least four within the greater Houston area. The board of trustees delegates its power by appointing a president to serve as the chief executive of the university. Reginald DesRoches was appointed president in 2022 and succeeded David W. Leebron, who served since 2004. The provost, three executive vice presidents, and seven vice presidents report to the president.

The university's academics are organized into several schools. The Susanne M. Glasscock School of Continuing Studies has only graduate programs. Schools that have undergraduate and graduate programs include:

- Rice University School of Architecture
- George R. Brown School of Engineering and Computing
- School of Humanities
- Shepherd School of Music
- Wiess School of Natural Sciences
- Rice University School of Social Sciences
- Jesse H. Jones Graduate School of Management

Rice's undergraduate students are admitted from a centralized admissions process, which admits new students to the university as a whole, rather than a specific school (the schools of Music and Architecture are decentralized). Students are encouraged to select the major path that best suits their desires; a student can later decide that they would rather pursue study in another field, or continue their current coursework and add a second or third major. These transitions are designed to be simple, with students not required to decide on a specific major until their sophomore year of study. Rice offers 360 degrees in over 60 departments. There are 40 undergraduate degree programs, 51 masters programs, and 29 doctoral programs.

Faculty members of each of the departments elect chairs to represent the department to each School's dean and the deans report to the Provost who serves as the chief officer for academic affairs.

=== Rice Management Company ===
The Rice Management Company manages the $8.1 billion Rice University endowment (June 2021) and $1.1 billion debt. The endowment provides 40% of Rice's operating revenues.

In August 2021, an economic development agreement that would provide Rice Management Company with up to $65 million in cost reimbursement from local taxes was given initial approval by the Midtown Tax Increment Reinvestment Zone. The agreement does not require a community benefits agreement in exchange for funding. Final approval requires a vote by the Houston City Council.

== Academics ==
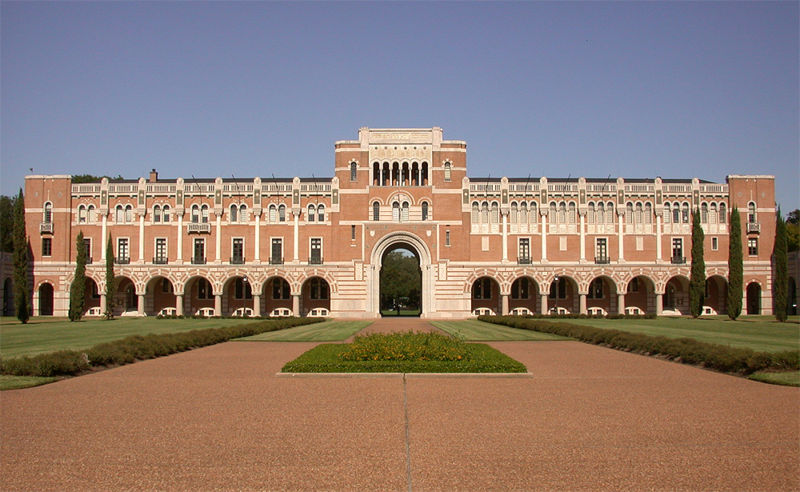
Lovett Hall, formerly known as the Administration Building, was the first building on campus.

Rice is a medium-sized, highly residential research university. The majority of enrollments are in the full-time, four-year undergraduate program emphasizing arts & sciences and professions. There is a very high level of research activity. It is accredited by the Southern Association of Colleges and Schools as well as the professional accreditation agencies for engineering, management, and architecture.

Each of Rice's departments is organized into one of three distribution groups, and students whose major lies within the scope of one group must take at least three courses of at least three credit hours each of approved distribution classes in each of the other two groups, as well as completing one physical education course as part of the LPAP (Lifetime Physical Activity Program) requirement. All new students must take a Freshman Writing Intensive Seminar (FWIS) class, and for students who do not pass the university's composition examination (administered during the summer before matriculation), FWIS 100, a writing class, becomes an additional requirement.

=== Student body ===
Student body composition as of May 2, 2022
Race and ethnicity	Total
White	31%
Asian	28%
Hispanic	16%
Foreign national	12%
Black	8%
Other (Note: Other consists of multiracial Americans & those who prefer to not say.)	6%
Economic diversity
Low-income (Note: The percentage of students who received an income-based federal Pell grant intended for low-income students.)	17%
Affluent (Note: The percentage of students who are a part of the American middle class at the bare minimum.)	83%

As of fall 2022, men made up 51.1% of the undergraduate body and 63.1% of the professional and post-graduate student body. 36.9% of degree-seeking students were from out of state, 35.9% were from Texas and 27.2% were from outside of the United States. In 2022, the largest proportion of international students came from Asian countries, with 1623 out of the 2344 total students (or 69.24%) coming from China (1145), India (296), Taiwan (93), and Korea (89).

=== Honor Code ===
The Rice Honor Code plays an integral role in academic affairs. Almost all Rice exams are unproctored and professors give timed, closed-book exams that students take home and complete at their own convenience. Potential infractions are reported to the student Honor Council, elected by popular vote. The penalty structure is established every year by Council consensus; typically, penalties have ranged from a letter of reprimand to an 'F' in the course and a two semester suspension. During Orientation Week, students must take and pass a test demonstrating that they understand the Honor System's requirements and sign a Matriculation Pledge. On assignments, Rice students affirm their commitment to the Honor Code by writing "On my honor, I have neither given nor received any unauthorized aid on this [examination, quiz or paper]".

=== Research centers and resources ===
- Rice Alliance for Technology and Entrepreneurship – supports entrepreneurs and early-stage technology ventures in Houston and Texas through education, collaboration, and research, ranked No. 1 among university business incubators.
- Baker Institute for Public Policy – a leading nonpartisan public policy think-tank
- BioScience Research Collaborative (BRC) – interdisciplinary, cross-campus, and inter-institutional resource between Rice University and Texas Medical Center
- Boniuk Institute – dedicated to religious tolerance and advancing religious literacy, respect and mutual understanding
- Center for African and African American Studies – fosters conversations on topics such as critical approaches to race and racism, the nature of diasporic histories and identities, and the complexity of Africa's past, present and future
- Chao Center for Asian Studies – research hub for faculty, students and post-doctoral scholars working in Asian studies
- Center for the Study of Women, Gender, and Sexuality (CSWGS) – interdisciplinary academic programs and research opportunities, including the journal Feminist Economics
- Data to Knowledge Lab (D2K) – campus hub for experiential learning in data science
- Digital Signal Processing (DSP) – center for education and research in the field of digital signal processing
- Humanities Research Center (HRC) – identifies, encourages, and funds innovative research projects by faculty, visiting scholars, graduate, and undergraduate students in the School of Humanities and beyond
- Institute of Biosciences and Bioengineering (IBB) – facilitates the translation of interdisciplinary research and education in biosciences and bioengineering
- Ken Kennedy Institute for Information Technology – advances applied interdisciplinary research in the areas of computation and information technology
- Kinder Institute for Urban Research – conducts the Houston Area Survey, "the nation's longest running study of any metropolitan region's economy, population, life experiences, beliefs and attitudes"
- Laboratory for Nanophotonics (LANP) – a resource for education and research breakthroughs and advances in the broad, multidisciplinary field of nanophotonics
- Liu Idea Lab for Innovation and Entrepreneurship (Lilie) - experiential learning and co-curricular activities in entrepreneurship
- Moody Center for the Arts – experimental arts space featuring studio classrooms, maker space, audiovisual editing booths, and a gallery and office space for visiting national and international artists
- OpenStax CNX (formerly Connexions) and OpenStax – an open source platform and open access publisher, respectively, of open educational resources
- Oshman Engineering Design Kitchen (OEDK) – space for undergraduate students to design, prototype and deploy solutions to real-world engineering challenges
- Rice Advanced Materials Institute - interdisciplinary research institute focused on materials discovery, design, and manufacturing for applications in energy, sustainability, and national security.
- Rice Cinema – an independent theater run by the Visual and Dramatic Arts department at Rice which screens documentaries, foreign films, and experimental cinema and hosts film festivals and lectures since 1970
- Rice Center for Engineering Leadership (RCEL)
- Religion and Public Life Program (RPLP) – a research, training and outreach program working to advance understandings of the role of religion in public life
- Rice Design Alliance (RDA) – outreach and public programs of the Rice School of Architecture
- Rice Center for Quantum Materials (RCQM) – organization dedicated to research and higher education in areas relating to quantum phenomena
- Rice Engineering Initiative for Energy Transition and Sustainability (REINVENTS) – research initiative on energy generation, long-term energy storage and the development of processes and materials for sustainable energy systems
- Rice Neuroengineering Initiative (NEI) – fosters research collaborations in neural engineering topics
- Rice Space Institute (RSI) – fosters programs in all areas of space research
- Shared Equipment Authority (SEA) — established in 2001 to provide state-of-the-art research equipment capabilities for Rice and the extended Rice community
- Smalley-Curl Institute for Nanoscale Science and Technology (SCI) – the nation's first nanotechnology center
- Welch Institute for Advanced Materials – collaborative research institute to support the foundational research for discoveries in materials science, similar to the model of Salk Institute and Broad Institute
- Woodson Research Center Special Collections & Archives – publisher of print and web-based materials highlighting the department's primary source collections such as the Houston African American, Asian American, and Jewish History Archives, University Archives, rare books, and hip hop/rap music-related materials from the Swishahouse record label and Houston Folk Music Archive, etc.

=== Admissions ===
Fall freshman statistics
	2024	2023	2022	2021	2020	2019	2018
Applicants	32,473	31,059	31,443	29,544	23,455	27,087	20,923
Admits	2,597	2,447	2,730	2,802	2,555	2,361	2,328
Admit rate	8.0%	7.9%	8.7%	9.5%	10.9%	8.7%	11.1%
Enrolled	1,148	1,125	1,203	1,226	993	964	960
SAT range	1510–1560	1500–1570	1490–1570	1490–1570	1460–1570	1470–1560	1460–1550
ACT range	34–35	34–36	34–36	34–35	34–36	33–35	33–35

Admission to Rice is rated as "most selective" by U.S. News & World Report.

For fall 2025, Rice received 36,791 freshmen applications of which 2,948 were admitted (8.0%) slightly higher than the record-low 7.9% acceptance rate in 2023. Of those, 1,263 enrolled. The 25th and 75th SAT scores for the class of 2025 were 1500 and 1570 respectively; the same range for the ACT Composite score was 34–36.

Admission to the university is need-blind for domestic applicants.

=== Rankings and reputation ===
Academic rankings

National
- Forbes: 12
- U.S. News & World Report: 17
- Washington Monthly: 63
- WSJ/College Pulse: 29

Global
- ARWU: 101–150
- QS: =119
- THE: =112
- U.S. News & World Report: 219

National program rankings
Program	Ranking
Biological Sciences	39
Business	25
Chemistry	32
Computer Science	20
Earth Sciences	24
Economics	42
Engineering	33
English	35
History	34
Mathematics	26
Physics	28
Political Science	33
Psychology	50
Statistics	43

Global subject rankings
Program	Ranking
Arts & Humanities	194
Biology & Biochemistry	222
Chemistry	119
Clinical Medicine	684
Engineering	224
Environment/Ecology	248
Geosciences	163
Materials Science	14
Mathematics	87
Molecular Biology & Genetics	333
Physics	82
Social Sciences & Public Health	386

Rice was ranked tied at 17th among national universities and 108th among global universities, 6th for "best undergraduate teaching", 5th for "Best Value", and tied for 16th "Most Innovative" among national universities in the U.S. by U.S. News & World Report in its 2022 edition. In 2024, Forbes magazine ranked Rice University 9th nationally among 500 liberal arts colleges, universities and service academies, 1st among universities in the south, and 9th among research universities.

In 2020, Rice was ranked 105th in the world by the Times Higher Education World University Rankings. In 2020, Rice was ranked tied for 95th internationally (41st nationally) by the Academic Ranking of World Universities. Rice was also ranked 85th globally in 2020 by QS World University Rankings.

The Princeton Review ranked Rice as one of the top 50 best value private colleges in its 2020 edition.

== Student life ==
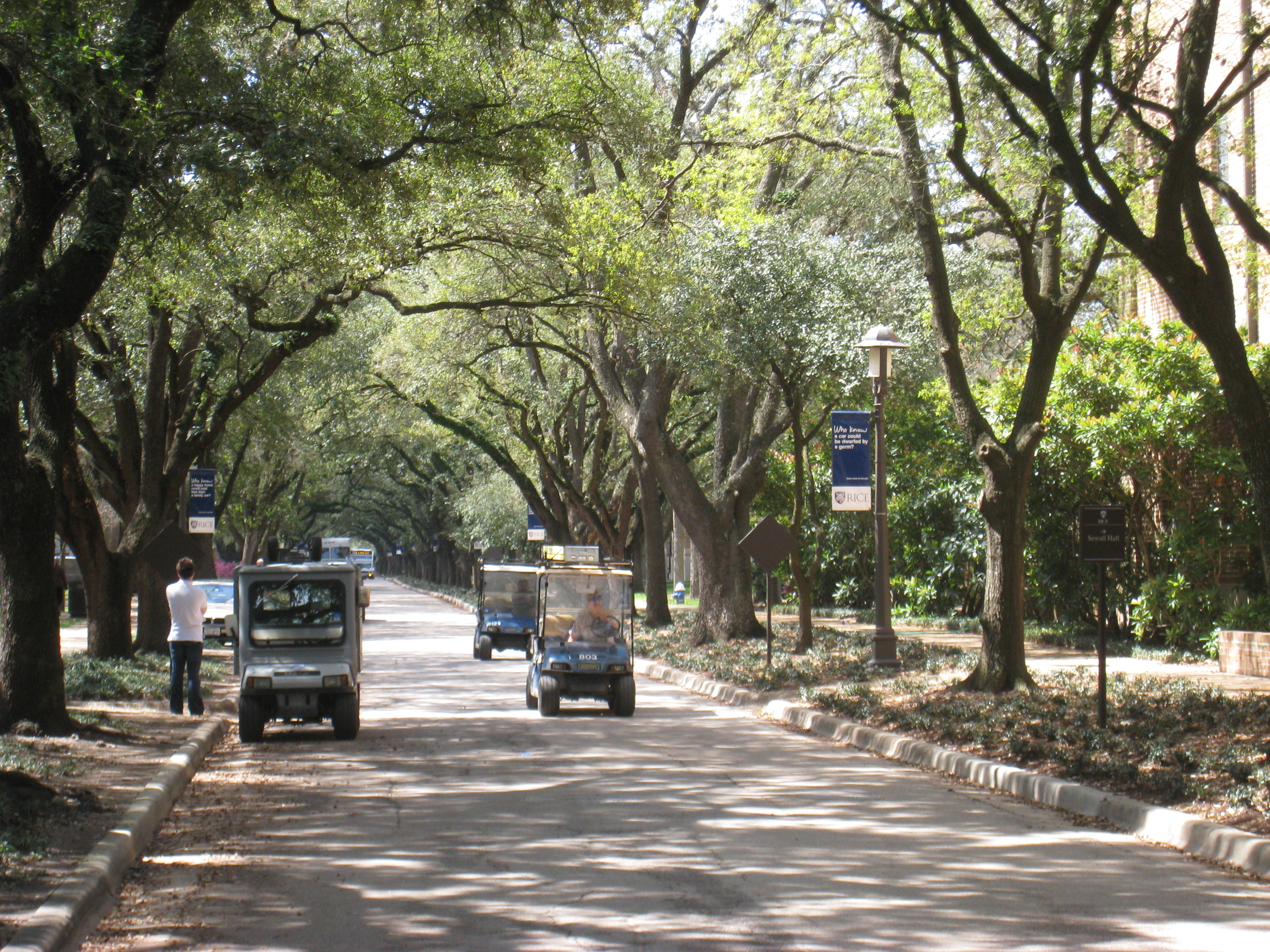
A view along the inner loop, with three of the university service personnel's traditional golf carts in view

Rice University's 300-acre (120 ha) campus is located in Houston's Museum District and surrounded by greenery, adjacent to Hermann Park, Rice Village, and the Texas Medical Center. Hermann Park features many attractions, including the Houston Museum of Natural Science, Miller Outdoor Theatre, and a municipal golf course. The Houston METRORail system provides access to downtown's theatre and nightlife district and Reliant Park, with a station located adjacent to the university's main gate. In 2008, Rice University joined the Zipcar program, providing two vehicles to offer more transportation options for students who do not have access to a vehicle.

=== Residential colleges ===
In 1957, Rice University implemented a residential college system, which was proposed by the university's first president, Edgar Odell Lovett. The system was inspired by existing systems in place in England and at several other universities in the United States. The existing residences known as East, South, West, and Wiess Halls became Baker, Will Rice, Hanszen, and Wiess Colleges, respectively.

==== List of residential colleges ====
Below is a list of residential colleges in order of founding:

- Baker College, named in honor of Captain James A. Baker, friend and attorney of William Marsh Rice, and first chair of the Rice Board of Governors
- Will Rice College, named for William M. Rice, Jr., nephew of the university's founder, William Marsh Rice
- Hanszen College, named for Harry Clay Hanszen, benefactor to the university and chairman of the Rice Board of Governors from 1946 to 1950
- Wiess College, named for Harry Carothers Wiess (1887–1948), one of the founders and one-time president of Humble Oil, now ExxonMobil
- Jones College, named for Mary Gibbs Jones, wife of prominent Houston philanthropist Jesse Holman Jones
- Brown College, named for Margarett Root Brown by her in-law, George R. Brown
- Lovett College, named after the university's first president, Edgar Odell Lovett
- Sid Richardson College, named for the Sid Richardson Foundation, established by Texas oilman, cattleman, and philanthropist Sid W. Richardson
- Martel College, named for Marian and Speros P. Martel, built in 2002
- McMurtry College, named for Rice alumni Burt and Deedee McMurtry, Silicon Valley venture capitalists
- Duncan College, named for Charles Duncan, Jr., U.S. secretary of energy, 1979–1981
- Chao College, named after Ting Tsung and Wei Fong Chao, opened in 2026

Each residential college has its own cafeteria (serveries) and each residential college has study groups and its own social practices.

Although each college is composed of a full cross-section of students at Rice, they have over time developed their own traditions and "personalities." When students matriculate they are randomly assigned to one of the eleven colleges, although "legacy" exceptions are made for students whose siblings or parents have attended Rice. Students generally remain members of the college that they are assigned to for the duration of their undergraduate careers, even if they move off-campus at any point. Students are guaranteed on-campus housing for freshman year and two of the next three years; each college has its own system for determining allocation of the remaining spaces, collectively known as "Room Jacking". Students develop strong loyalties to their college and maintain friendly rivalry with other colleges, especially during events such as Beer Bike and O-Week. Colleges keep their rivalries alive by performing "jacks," or pranks, on each other, especially during O-Week and Beer Bike Week. During Matriculation, Commencement, and other formal academic ceremonies, the colleges process in the order in which they were established.

==== Baker 13 ====
Baker 13 is a tradition in which students run around campus wearing nothing but shoes and shaving cream at 10 p.m. on the 13th and the 31st of every month, as well as the 26th on months with fewer than 31 days. The event, long sponsored by Baker College, usually attracts a small number of students, but Halloween night and the first and last relevant days of the school year both attract large numbers of revelers.

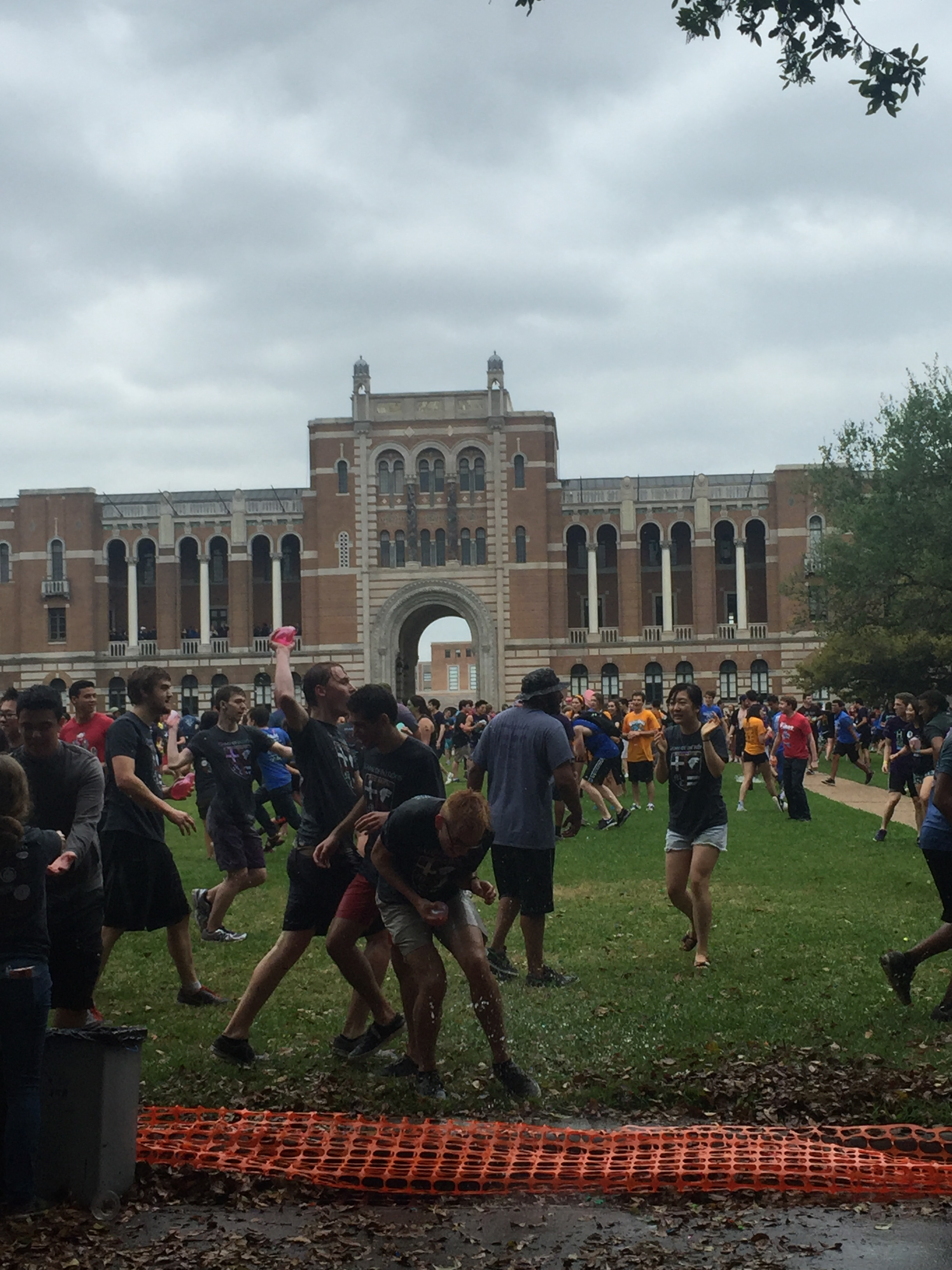
Rice University students participating in the Beer Bike water balloon fight in front of the Sallyport

==== Beer Bike Race ====
According to the official website, "Beer Bike is a combination intramural bicycle race and drinking competition dating back to 1957. Ten riders and ten chuggers make up a team. Elaborate rules include details such as a prohibition of "bulky or wet clothing articles designed to absorb beer/water or prevent spilled beer/water from being seen" and regulations for chug can design. Each residential college as well as the Graduate Student Association participates with a men's team, a women's team, and alumni (co-ed) team. Each leg of the race is a relay in which a team's "chugger" must chug 24 US fluid ounces (710 ml) of beer or water for the men's division and 12 US fluid ounces (350 ml) for women before the team's "rider" may begin to ride. Participants who both ride and chug are referred to as "Ironmen". Willy Week is a term coined in the 1990s to refer to the week preceding Beer Bike, a time of general energy and excitement on campus. Jacks (pranks) are especially common during Willy Week; some examples in the past include removing showerheads and encasing the Hanszen guardian."

The morning of the Beer Bike race itself begins with what is by some estimations the largest annual water balloon fight in the world. Beer Bike is Rice's most prominent student event, and for younger alumni it serves as an unofficial reunion weekend on par with Homecoming. The 2009 Beer Bike race was dedicated to the memory of Dr. Bill Wilson, a popular professor and long-time resident associate of Wiess College who died earlier that year.

In the event of inclement weather, Beer Bike becomes a Beer Run. The rules are nearly identical, except that the Bikers must instead run the length of the track.

=== Campus institutions ===
==== Rice Coffeehouse ====
Rice Coffeehouse began in Hanszen College, where students would serve coffee in the Weenie Loft, a study room in the old section's fourth floor. Later, the coffee house moved to the Hanszen basement to accommodate more student patrons. That coffeehouse became known as Breadsticks and Pomegranates, and closed due to flooding. Demand for an on-campus Coffeehouse grew and in 1990, the Rice Coffeehouse was founded.

The Rice Coffeehouse is a not-for-profit student-run organization serving Rice University and the greater Houston community. Over the past few years, it has introduced fair-trade and organic coffee and loose-leaf teas.

Coffeehouse baristas are referred to as K.O.C.s, or Keepers of the Coffee. Rice Coffeehouse has also adopted an unofficial mascot, the squirrel, which can be found on T-shirts, mugs, and bumper stickers stuck on laptops across campus. The logo pays tribute to Rice's squirrel population, claimed by students to be unusually plump and frighteningly tame.

==== The Pub at Rice ====
Formerly known as Willy's Pub, The Pub at Rice is Rice's student-run pub located in the basement of the Rice Memorial Center. It opened on April 11, 1975, with Rice President Norman Hackerman pouring the first beer. The original name was chosen by students in tribute to the university's founder, William Marsh Rice. After the drinking age in Texas was raised in 1986, the pub entered a period of financial difficulties and in April 1995, was destroyed in a fire. The space was gutted but renovated and remains open. On February 15, 2022, the Rice Thresher announced the rebranding of Willy's Pub as The Pub at Rice.

==== Rice Bikes ====
Rice Bikes is a full-service on-campus bicycle sale, rental, and repair shop. It originated in the basement of Sid Richardson College in February 2011. In 2012, Rice Bikes officially became the university's third student-run business. Rice Bikes merged with a student-run bicycle rental business in 2013, and operations moved to the Rice Memorial Center in 2014. In 2017, the business moved to the garage of the Rice Housing and Dining department's headquarters.

Rice Bikes functions as a full bicycle repair shop.

==== Student-run media ====
Rice has a weekly student newspaper (The Rice Thresher), a yearbook (The Campanile), college radio station (KTRU Rice Radio), and now defunct, campus-wide student television station (RTV5). They are based out of the RMC student center. In addition, Rice hosts several student magazines dedicated to a range of different topics; the spring semester of 2008 saw the founding of two magazines, a literary sex journal called Open and an undergraduate science research magazine entitled Catalyst.

The Rice Thresher is published every Wednesday and is ranked by Princeton Review as one of the top campus newspapers nationally for student readership. It is distributed around campus, and at a few other local businesses and has a website. The Thresher has a small staff and has campus news, open submission opinion page, and the satirical Backpage, which has often been the center of controversy. The newspaper has won several awards from the College Media Association, Associated Collegiate Press and Texas Intercollegiate Press Association.

The Rice Campanile was first published in 1916, celebrating Rice's first graduating class. It has published continuously since then, publishing two volumes in 1944 since the university had two graduating classes due to World War II. The website was created sometime in the early to mid-2000s.

KTRU Rice Radio is the student-run radio station. It plays genres and artists of music and sound unavailable on other radio stations in Houston, and often, the US. The station takes requests over the phone or online. In 2000 and 2006, KTRU won Houston Press' Best Radio Station in Houston. In 2003, Rice alum and active KTRU DJ DL's hip-hip show won Houston Press' Best Hip-hop Radio Show. On August 17, 2010, it was announced that Rice University had been in negotiations to sell the station's broadcast tower, FM frequency and license to the University of Houston System to become a full-time classical music and fine arts programming station. The new station, KUHA, would be operated as a not-for-profit outlet with listener supporters. The FCC approved the sale and granted the transfer of license to the University of Houston System on April 15, 2011 (ultimately, KUHA was again sold in 2016 to the owners of contemporary Christian station KSBJ, who now operate it as Spanish Christian-formatted KHVU). KTRU continued to operate much as it did previously, streaming live on the Internet, via apps, and on HD2 radio using the 90.1 signal. Under student leadership, KTRU explored the possibility of returning to FM radio for a number of years. In spring 2015, KTRU was granted permission by the FCC to begin development of a new broadcast signal via LPFM radio. On October 1, 2015, KTRU made its official return to FM radio on the 96.1 signal. While broadcasting on HD2 radio has been discontinued, KTRU continues to broadcast via internet in addition to its LPFM signal.

RTV5 is a student-run television network available as channel 5 on campus. RTV5 was created initially as Rice Broadcast Television in 1997; RBT began to broadcast the following year in 1998, and aired its first live show across campus in 1999. It experienced much growth and exposure over the years with successful programs like "Drinking with Phil", "The Meg & Maggie Show", which was a variety and call-in show, a weekly news show, and extensive live coverage in December 2000 of the shut down of KTRU by the administration. In spring 2001, the Rice undergraduate community voted in the general elections to support RBT as a blanket tax organization, effectively providing a yearly income of $10,000 to purchase new equipment and provide the campus with a variety of new programming. In the spring of 2005, RBT members decided the station needed a new image and a new name: Rice Television 5. One of RTV5's most popular shows was the 24-hour show, where a camera and couch placed in the RMC stayed on air for 24 hours. One such show is held in fall and another in spring, usually during a weekend allocated for visits by prospective students. RTV5 has a video on demand site at rtv5.rice.edu. The station went off the air in 2014 and changed its name to Rice Video Productions. In 2015 the group's funding was threatened, but ultimately maintained. In 2016 the small student staff requested to no longer be a blanket-tax organization.

The Rice Review, also known as R2, is a yearly student-run literary journal at Rice University that publishes prose, poetry, and creative nonfiction written by undergraduate students, as well as interviews. The journal was founded in 2004 by creative writing professor and author Justin Cronin.

The Rice Standard was an independent, student-run variety magazine modeled after such publications as The New Yorker and Harper's. Prior to fall 2009, it was regularly published three times a semester with a wide array of content, running from analyses of current events and philosophical pieces to personal essays, short fiction and poetry. In August 2009, the Standard transitioned to a completely online format with the launch of their redesigned website, ricestandard.org. The first website of its kind on Rice's campus, the Standard featured blog-style content written by and for Rice students. The Rice Standard had around 20 regular contributors, and the site features new content every day (including holidays).

== Athletics ==
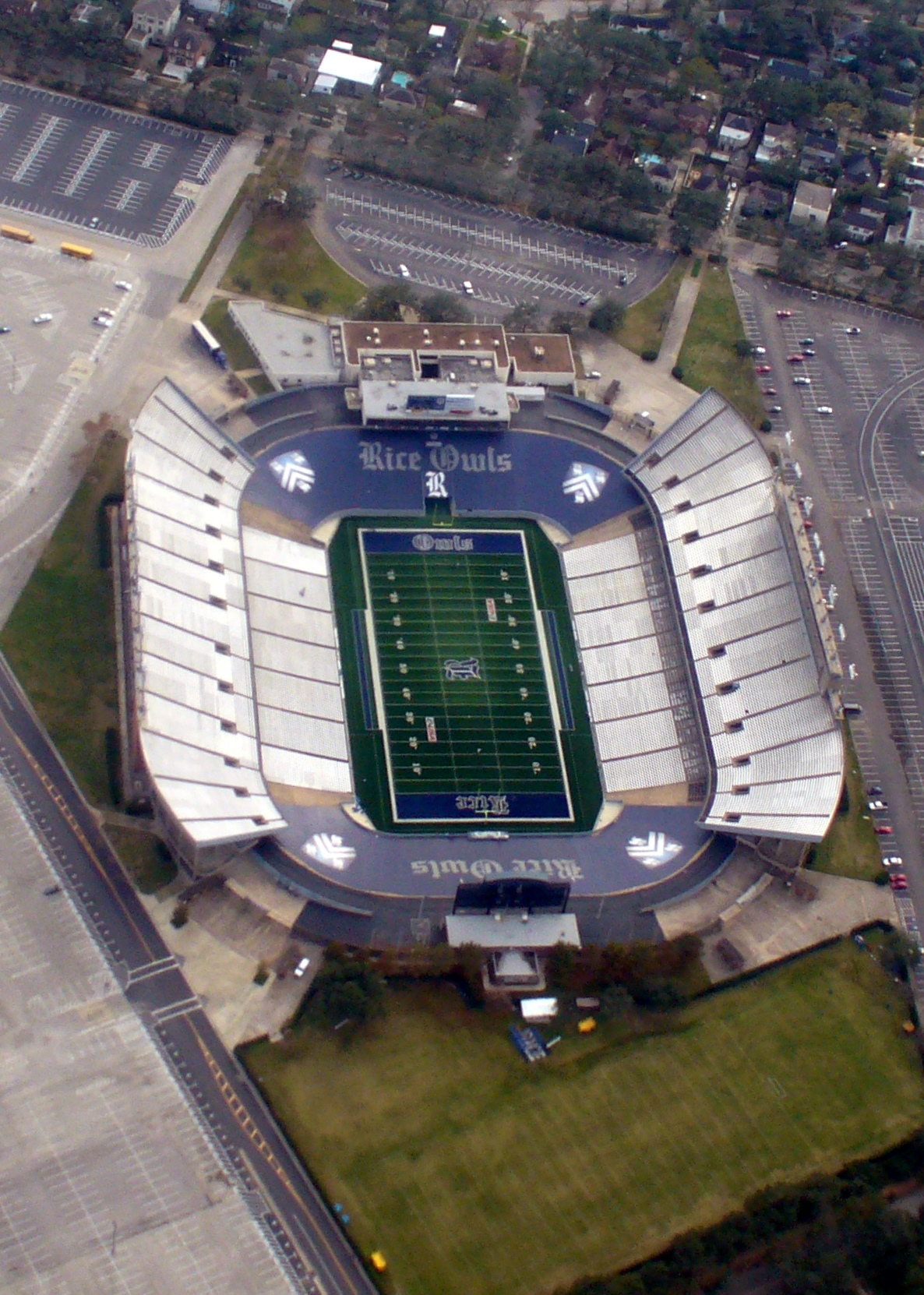
First Community Stadium

Rice plays in NCAA Division I athletics and has been a member of the American Conference since 2023. A founding member of the Southwest Conference until its dissolution in 1996, Rice was later a member of the Western Athletic Conference before joining Conference USA in 2005. Rice is the second-smallest school, measured by undergraduate enrollment, competing in NCAA Division I FBS football, only ahead of Tulsa.

The Rice baseball team won the 2003 College World Series, defeating Stanford, giving Rice its only national championship in a team sport. The victory made Rice University the smallest school in 51 years to win a national championship at the highest collegiate level of the sport. The Rice baseball team has played on campus at Reckling Park since the 2000 season. As of 2010, the baseball team has won 14 consecutive conference championships in three different conferences: the final championship of the defunct Southwest Conference, all nine championships while a member of the Western Athletic Conference, and five more championships in its first five years as a member of Conference USA. Additionally, Rice's baseball team has finished third in both the 2006 and 2007 College World Series tournaments. Rice now has made six trips to Omaha for the CWS. In 2004, Rice became the first school ever to have three players selected in the first eight picks of the MLB draft when Philip Humber, Jeff Niemann, and Wade Townsend were selected third, fourth, and eighth, respectively. In 2007, Joe Savery was selected as the 19th overall pick.

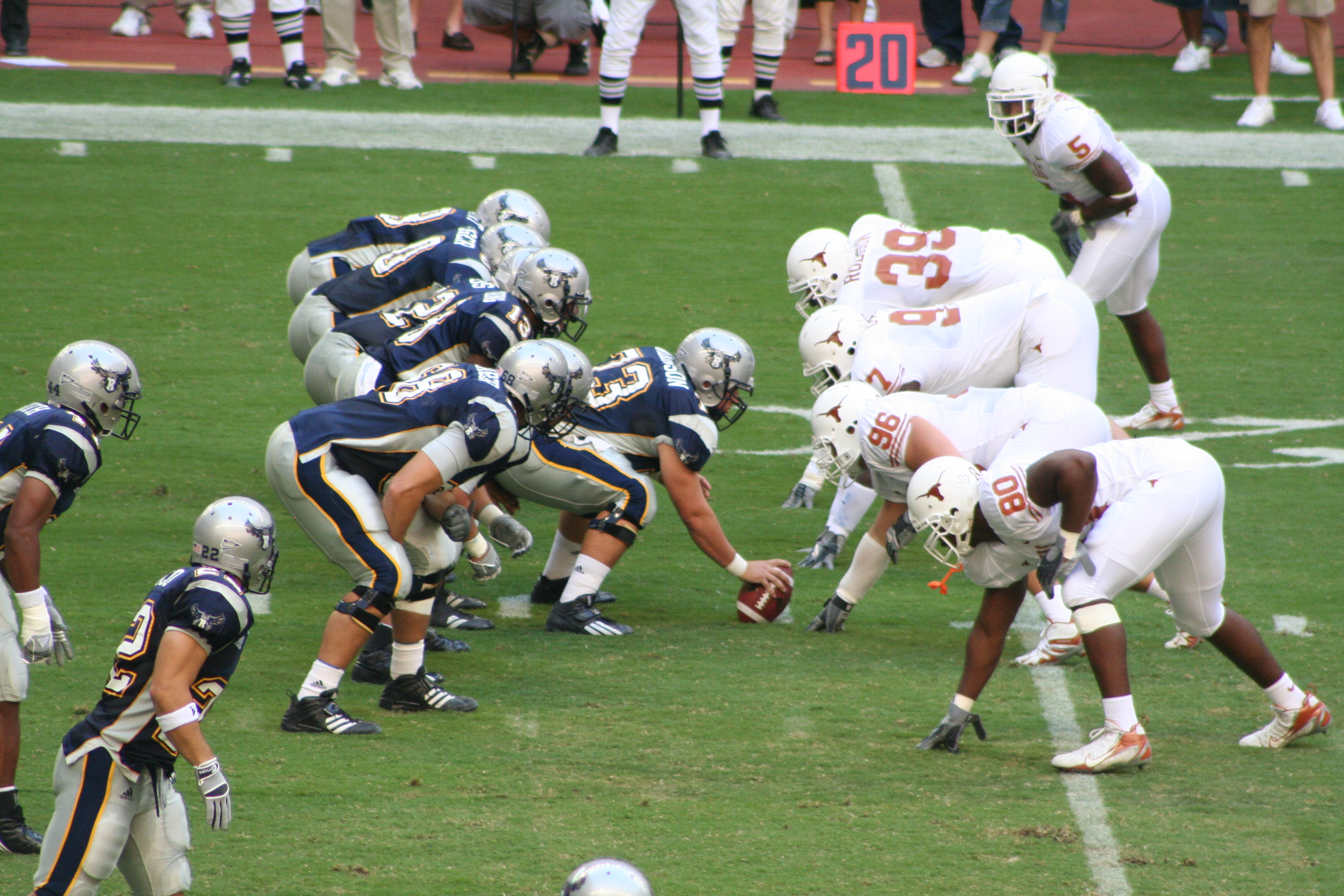
The Owls in a game against the Texas Longhorns

In 2004–05, Rice sent its women's volleyball, soccer, and basketball teams to their respective NCAA tournaments. The women's swim team has consistently brought at least one member of their team to the NCAA championships since 2013. In 2005–06, the women's soccer, basketball, and tennis teams advanced, with five individuals competing in track and field. In 2006–07, the Rice women's basketball team made the NCAA tournament, while again five Rice track and field athletes received individual NCAA berths. In 2008, the women's volleyball team again made the NCAA tournament. In 2011 the Women's Swim team won their first conference championship in the history of the university. This was an impressive feat considering they won without having a diving team. The team repeated their C-USA success in 2013 and 2014. In 2017, the women's basketball team, led by second-year head coach Tina Langley, won the Women's Basketball Invitational, defeating UNC-Greensboro 74–62 in the championship game at Tudor Fieldhouse. Though not a varsity sport, Rice's ultimate frisbee women's team, named Torque, won consecutive Division III national championships in 2014 and 2015.

In 2006, the football team qualified for its first bowl game since 1961, ending the second-longest bowl drought in the country at the time. On December 22, 2006, Rice played in the New Orleans Bowl in New Orleans, Louisiana against the Sun Belt Conference champion, Troy. The Owls lost 41–17. The bowl appearance came after Rice had a 14-game losing streak from 2004 to 2005 and went 1–10 in 2005. The streak followed an internally authorized 2003 McKinsey report that stated football alone was responsible for a $4 million deficit in 2002. Tensions remained high between the athletic department and faculty, as a few professors who chose to voice their opinion were in favor of abandoning the football program. The program success in 2006, the "Rice Renaissance," proved to be a revival of the Owl football program, quelling those tensions. David Bailiff took over the program in 2007 and has remained head coach. Jarett Dillard set an NCAA record in 2006 by catching a touchdown pass in 13 consecutive games and took a 15-game overall streak into the 2007 season.

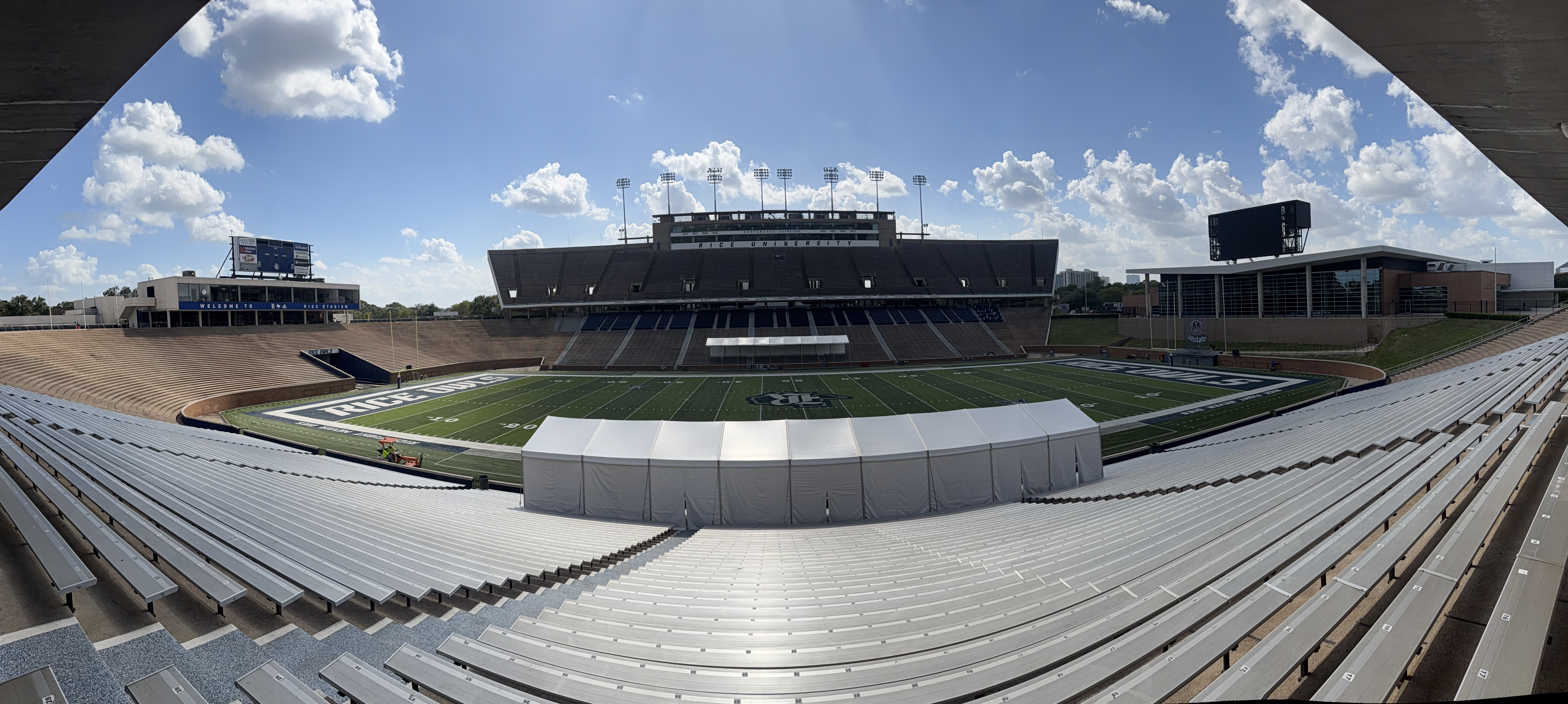
Panorama of First Community Stadium in July 2026

In 2008, the football team posted a 9–3 regular season, capping off the year with a 38–14 victory over Western Michigan University in the Texas Bowl. The win over Western Michigan marked the Owls' first bowl win in 45 years.

First Community Stadium also serves as the performance venue for the university's Marching Owl Band, or "MOB." Despite its name, the MOB is a scatter band that focuses on performing humorous skits and routines rather than traditional formation marching.

Rice Owls men's basketball won 10 conference titles in the former Southwest Conference (1918, 1935*, 1940, 1942*, 1943*, 1944*, 1945, 1949*, 1954*, 1970; * denotes shared title). Most recently, guard Morris Almond was drafted in the first round of the 2007 NBA draft by the Utah Jazz. Rice named former Cal Bears head coach Ben Braun as head basketball coach to succeed Willis Wilson, fired after Rice finished the 2007–2008 season with a winless (0–16) conference record and overall record of 3–27.

Rice's mascot is Sammy the Owl. In previous decades, the university kept several live owls on campus in front of Lovett College, but this practice has been discontinued, due to public concern regarding animal welfare.

Rice also has a 12-member coed cheerleading squad and a coed dance team, both of which perform at football and basketball games throughout the year.

== Notable people ==
As of 2011, Rice has graduated 98 classes of students consisting of 51,961 living alumni. Over 100 students at Rice have been Fulbright Scholars, 25 Marshall Scholars, 25 Mellon Fellows, 13 Rhodes Scholars, 5 Knight-Hennessy Scholars, 6 Udall Scholars, and 65 Watson Fellows, among several other honors and awards.

Rice's distinguished faculty and alumni consists of five Nobel laureates, a Turing Award winner, five Pulitzer Prize award winners, six Fulbright Scholars, 29 Alexander von Humboldt Foundation Recipients, 14 members of the American Academy of Arts and Sciences, 1 Abel Prize winner, 3 members of the American Philosophical Society, 36 Guggenheim Fellowships, 12 members of the National Academy of Engineering, 2 members of the National Academy of Medicine, 10 members of the National Academy of Sciences, five fellows of the National Humanities Center, and 86 fellows of the National Science Foundation.

In science and technology, Rice alumni include 14 NASA astronauts; Robert Curl, Nobel laureate discoverer of fullerene; Robert Woodrow Wilson, winner of the Nobel Prize in Physics for the discovery of cosmic microwave background radiation; Matthew Sands, physicist and co-author of The Feynman Lectures on Physics; David Eagleman, celebrity neuroscientist and NYT bestselling author; and NASA former Apollo 11 and 13 warning systems engineer and motivational speaker Jerry Woodfill.

In business and entrepreneurship, Rice alumni include:

- Brian Armstrong, founder and CEO of Coinbase
- Elizabeth Avellán, co-founder of Troublemaker Studios
- Thomas H. Cruikshank, former CEO of Halliburton
- John Doerr, billionaire and venture capitalist
- Howard Hughes, film producer and aviator
- Ali Koç, president of Fenerbahçe SK football club, Turkish Union of Clubs, and vice chairman of Koç Holding
- Fred C. Koch, chemical engineer and entrepreneur
- Tim and Karrie League, founders of the Alamo Drafthouse Cinema and Drafthouse Films

In government and politics, Rice alumni include:

- George P. Bush, politician
- Charles Duncan, former secretary of energy
- Josh Earnest, White House press secretary for President Obama
- Alberto Gonzales, former attorney general
- William P. Hobby, Jr., former lieutenant governor of Texas
- John Kline, former member of the U.S. House of Representatives
- Annise Parker, 61st mayor of Houston
- Ben Rhodes, deputy National Security advisor for President Obama
- Glenn Youngkin, governor of Virginia

In the arts, Rice alumni include:

- Candace Bushnell, author of Sex and the City, who attended for three semesters
- John Graves, author of Goodbye to a River
- Larry McMurtry, Pulitzer Prize–winning author and Oscar-winning writer of the screenplay for Brokeback Mountain
- Joyce Carol Oates (who left her Ph.D. to become a full-time writer), novelist and Pulitzer Prize finalist
- Caroline Shaw, Pulitzer Prize-winning musician

In athletics, Rice alumni include: Lance Berkman, Brock Holt, Bubba Crosby, Harold Solomon, Frank Ryan, Tommy Kramer,Jose Cruz, Jr., O.J. Brigance, Larry Izzo, James Casey, Courtney Hall, Bert Emanuel, Luke Willson, Tony Cingrani, Anthony Rendon, Mike MacRae, and Leo Rucka, as well as three Olympians (Funmi Jimoh '06, Allison Beckford '04, and William Fred Hansen '63).

Notable Rice University alumni

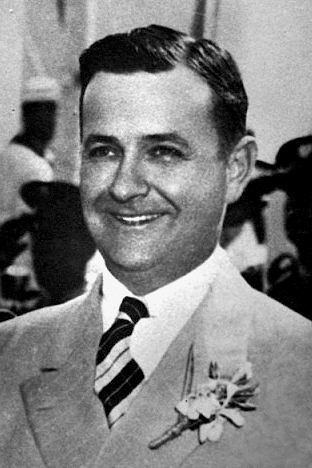
James V. Allred, 33rd governor of Texas

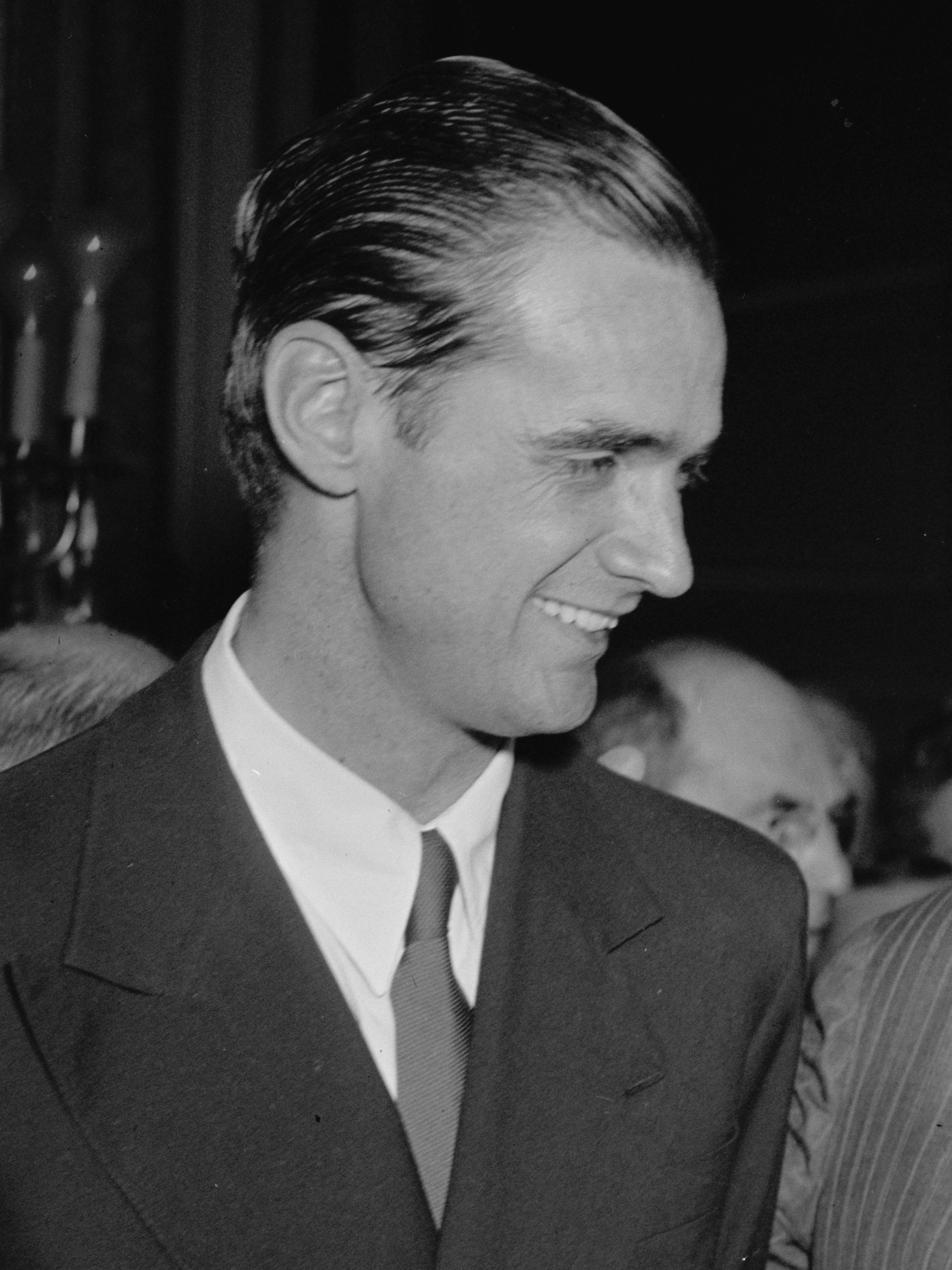
Howard Hughes, aviator, engineer, industrialist, film producer and director

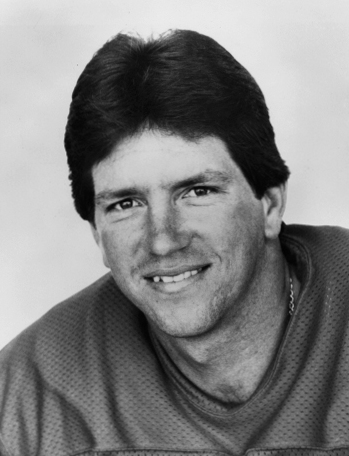
Tommy Kramer (1977), former quarterback for Minnesota Vikings

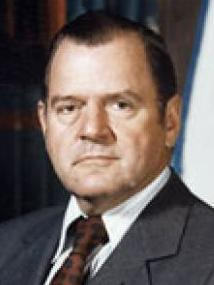
Charles Duncan Jr., second United States secretary of energy

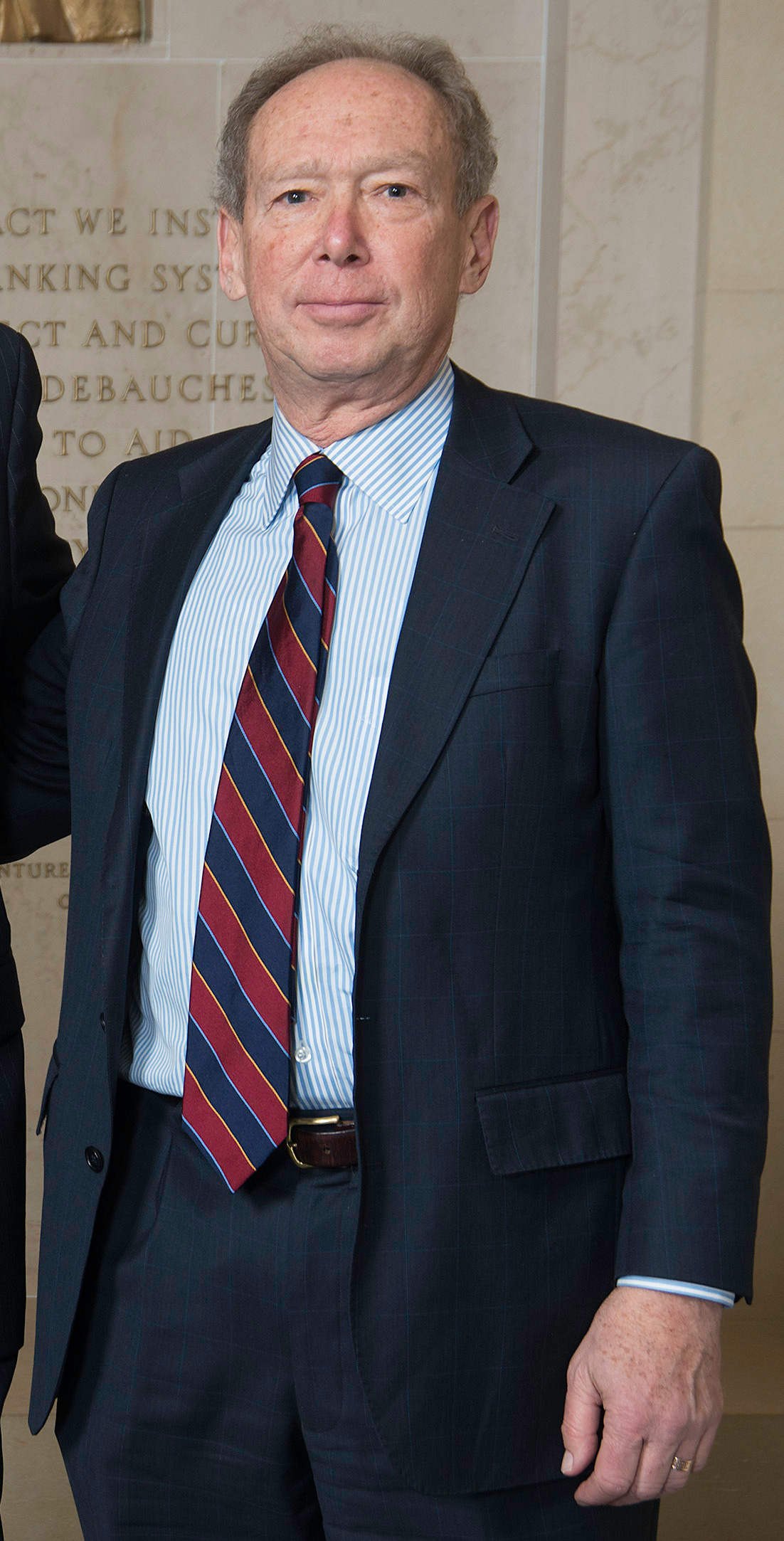
Gary H. Stern, eleventh chief executive of the Federal Reserve Bank of Minneapolis

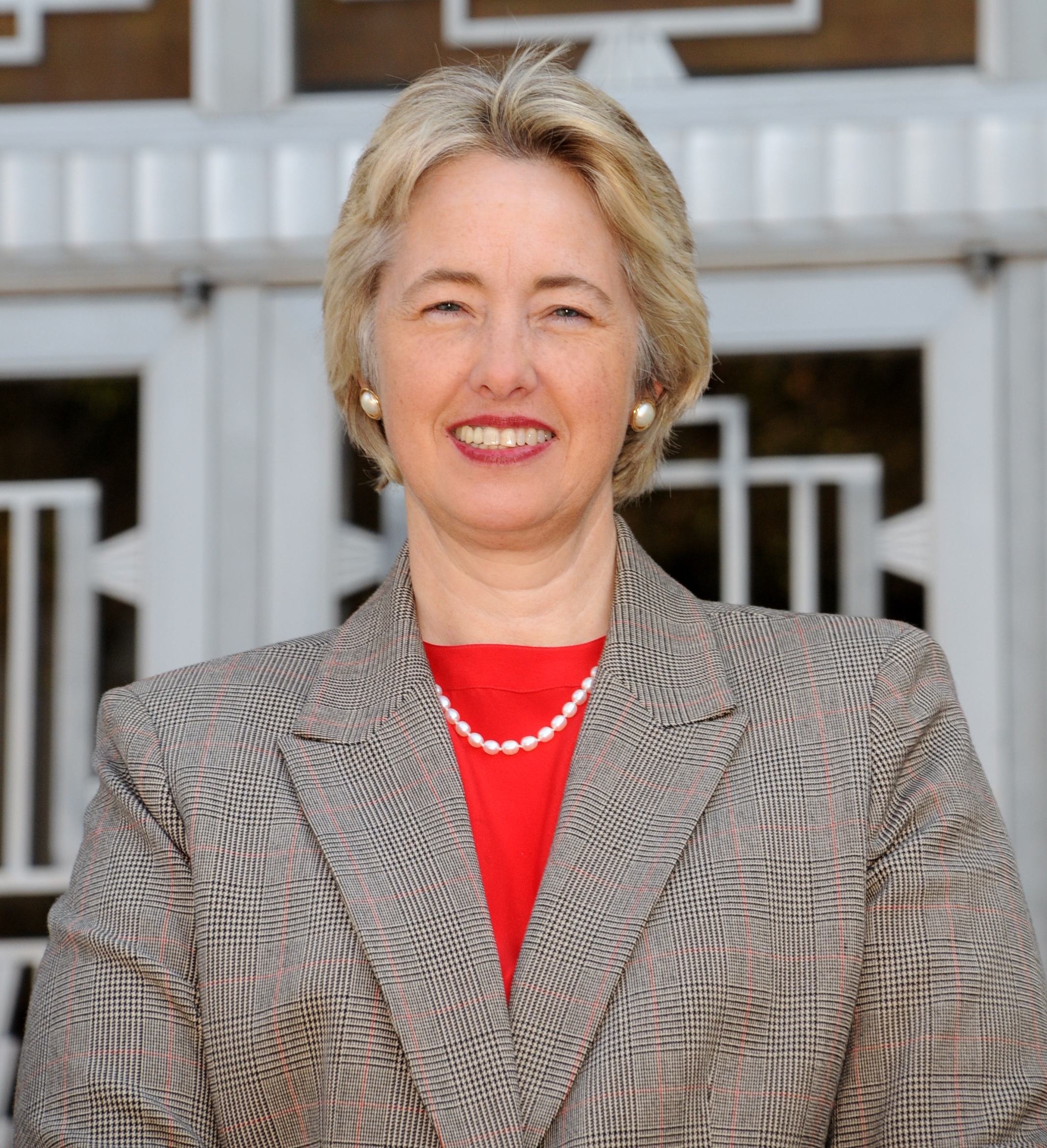
Annise Parker (1978), 61st mayor of Houston

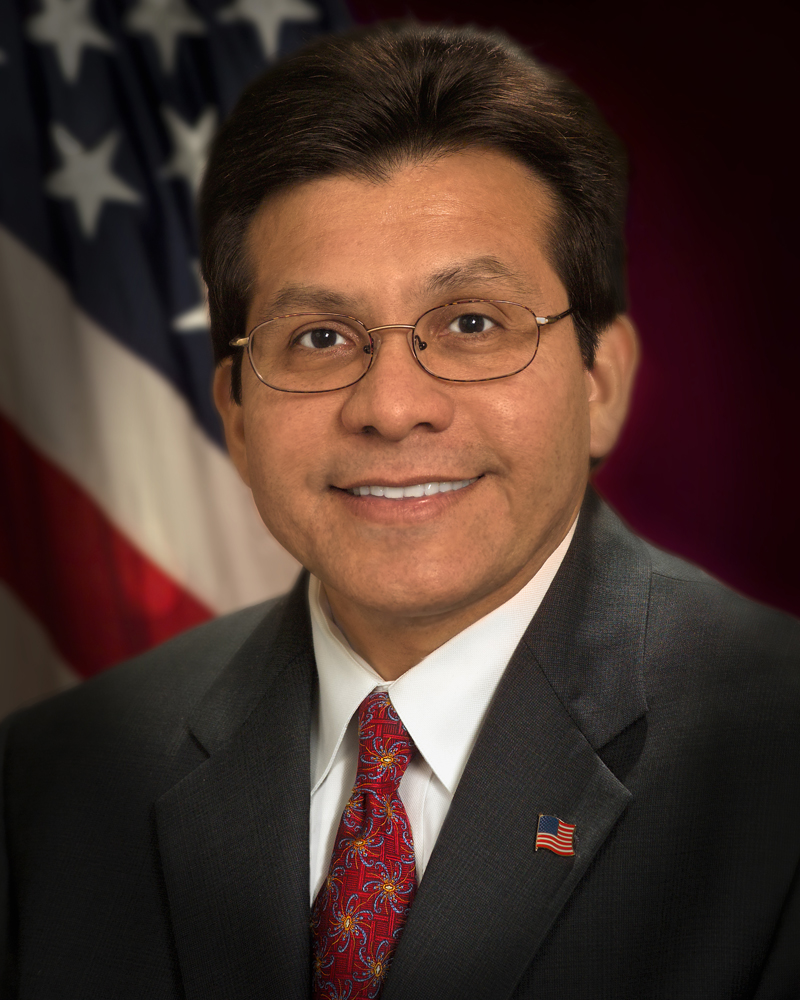
Alberto Gonzales (1979), former U.S. attorney general

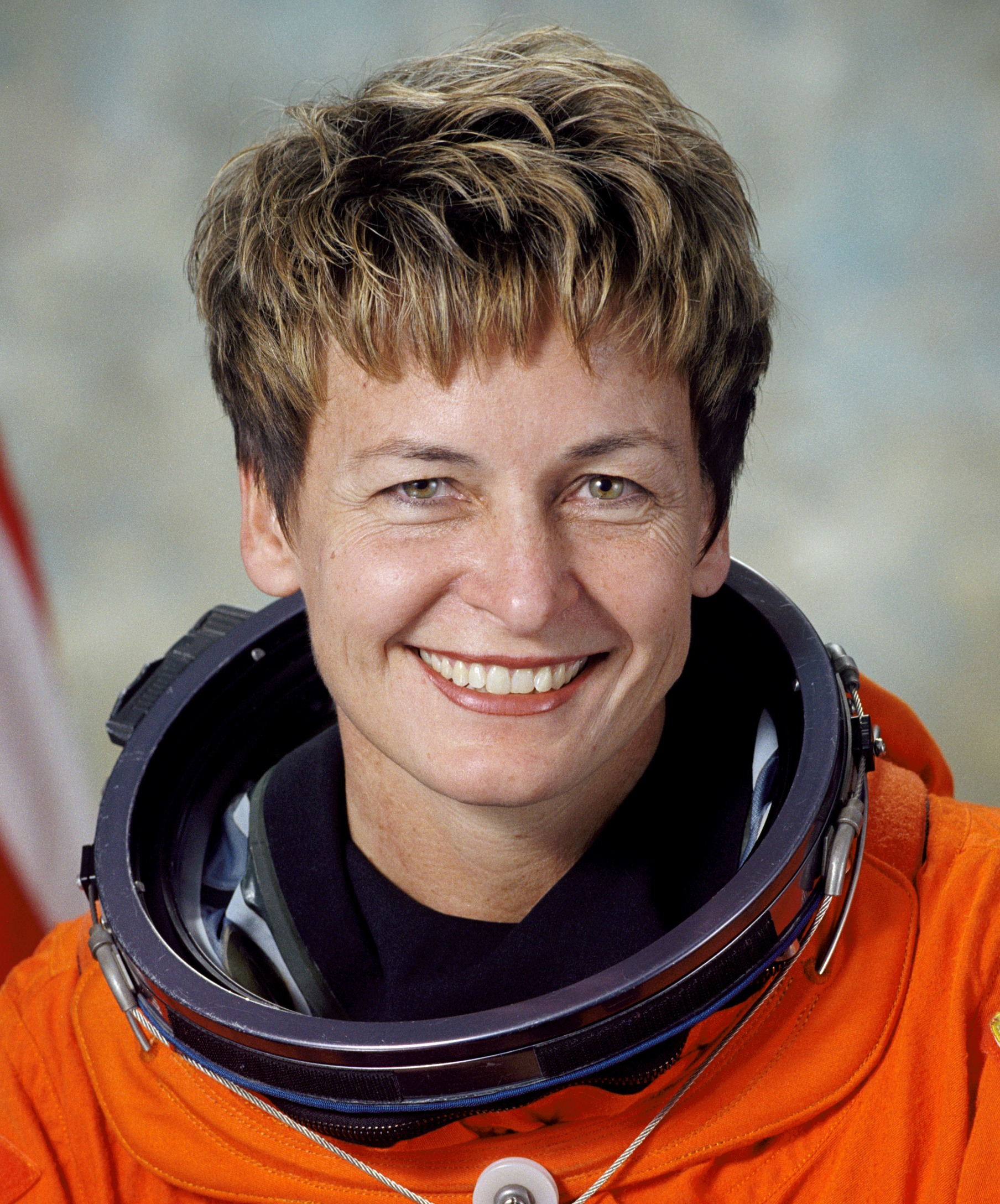
Peggy Whitson (1986), NASA astronaut

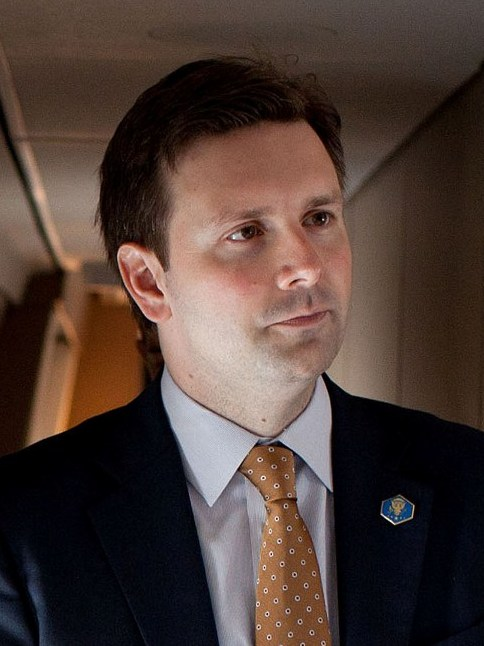
Josh Earnest (1997), 29th White House press secretary

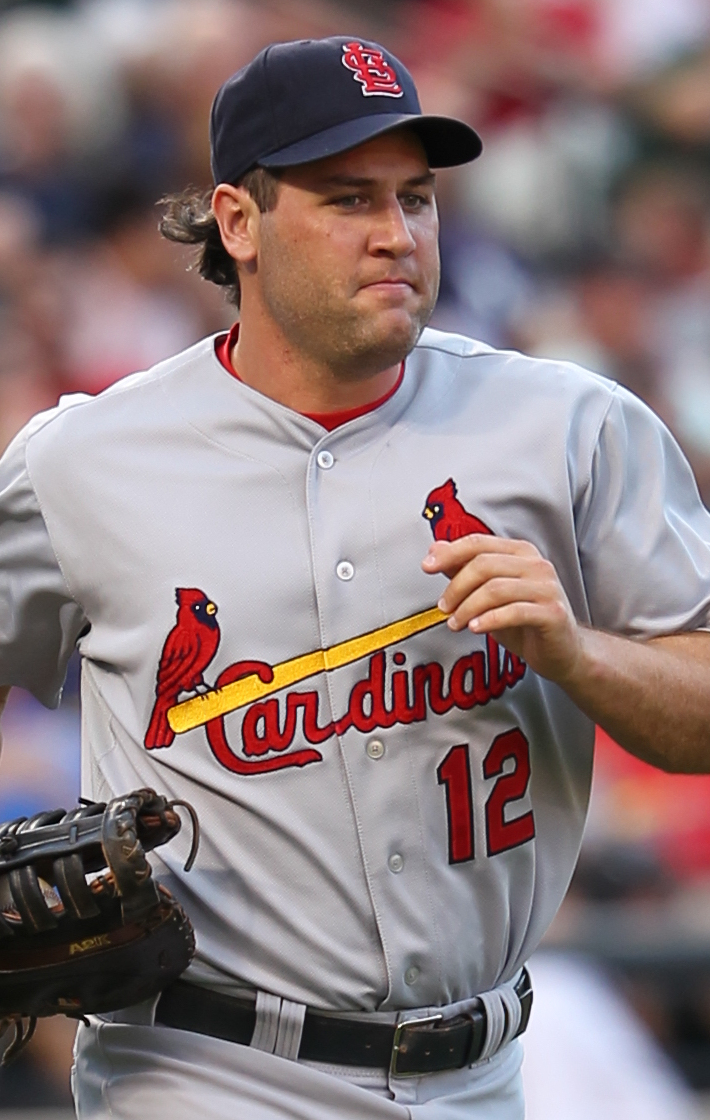
Lance Berkman, professional baseball outfielder and first baseman

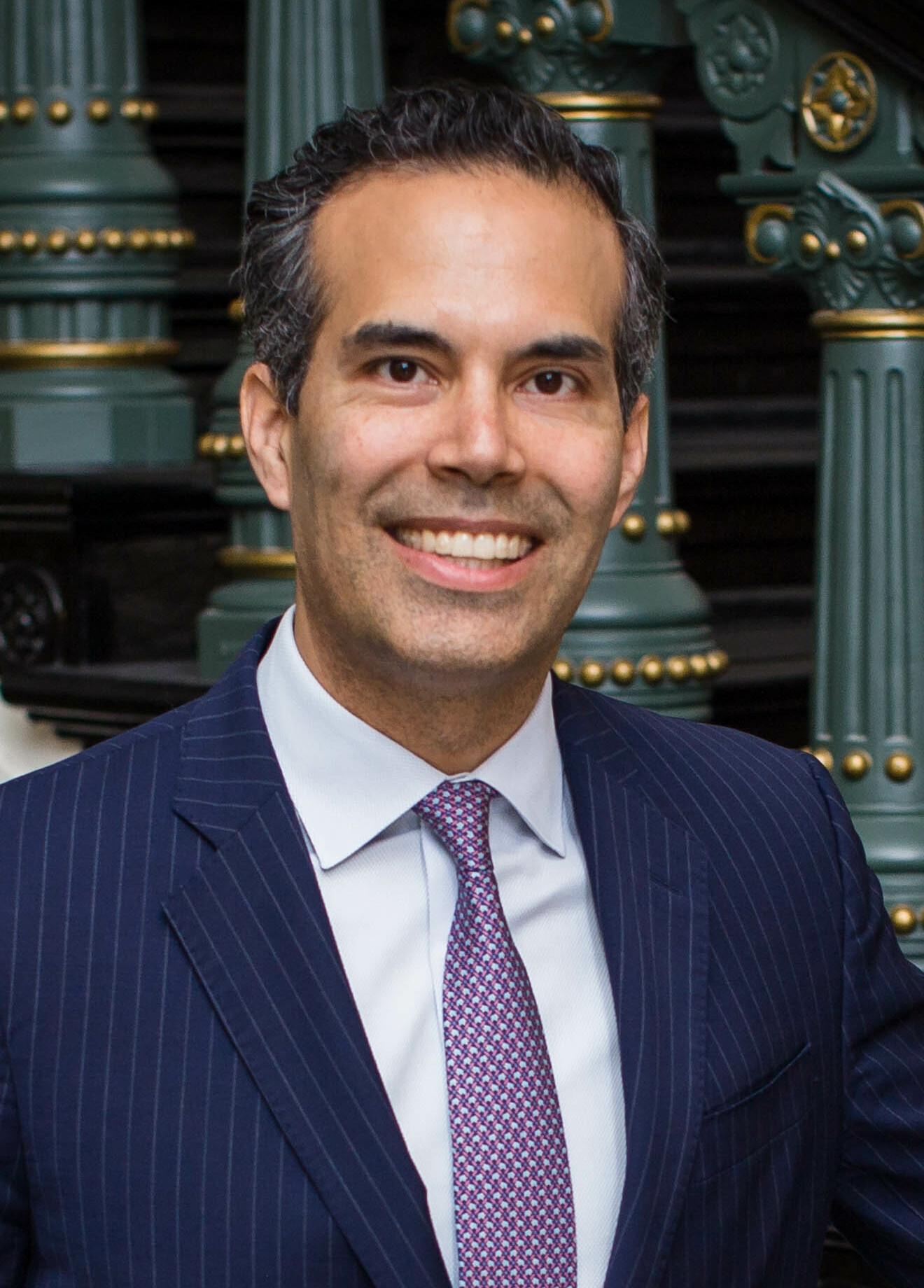
George P. Bush (1998), commissioner of the Texas General Land Office

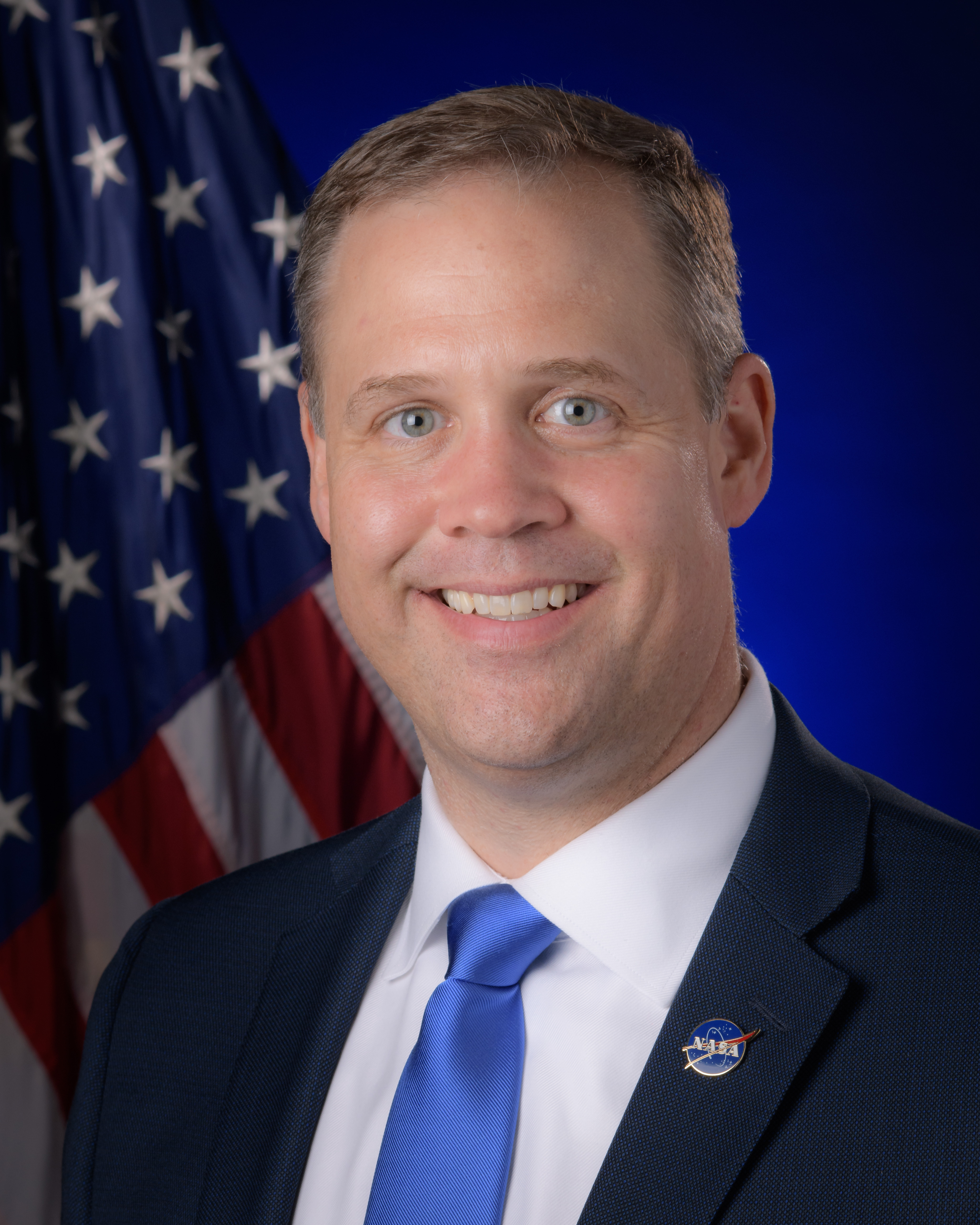
Jim Bridenstine (1998), thirteenth NASA administrator

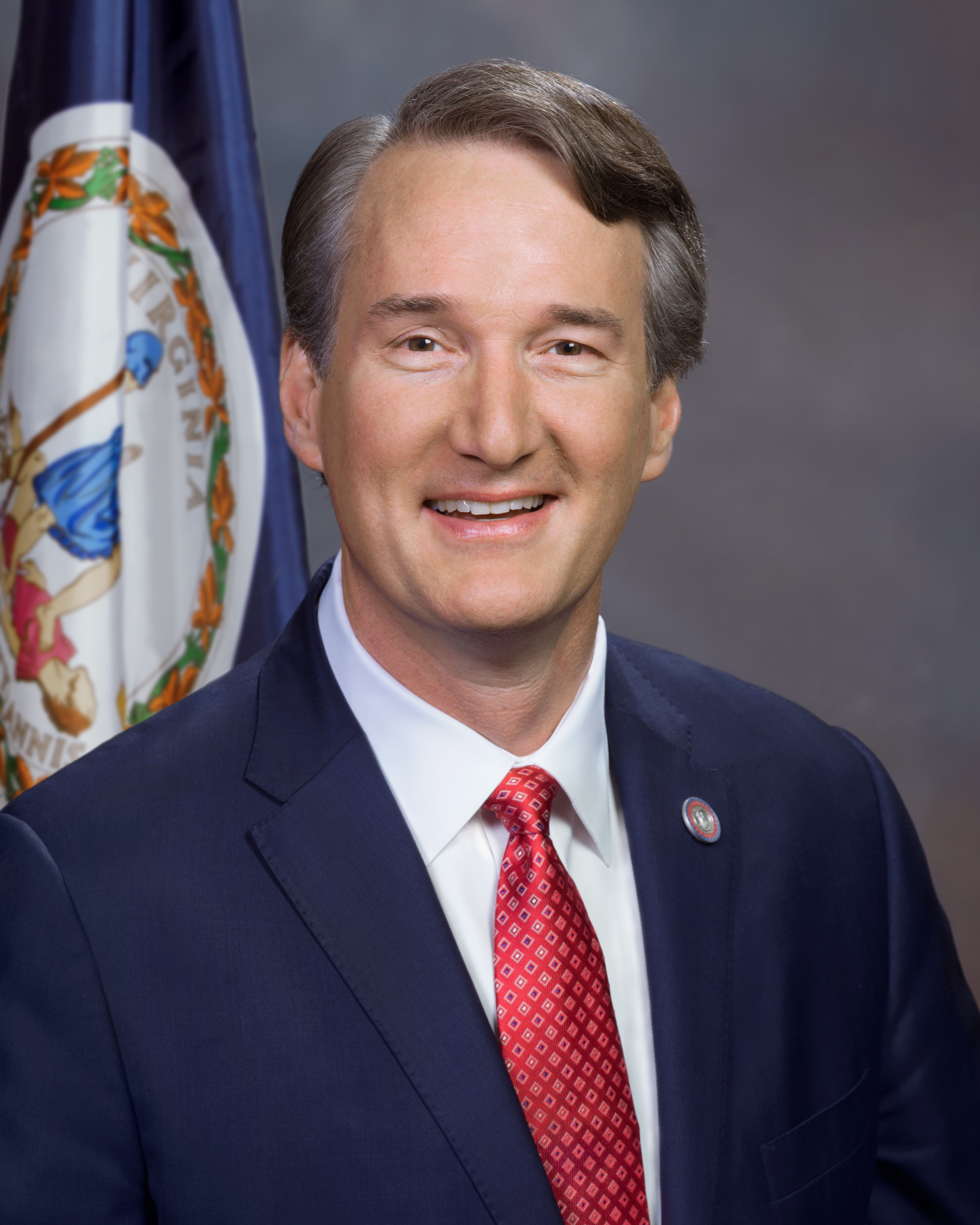
Glenn Youngkin (B.S., B.A.), governor of Virginia

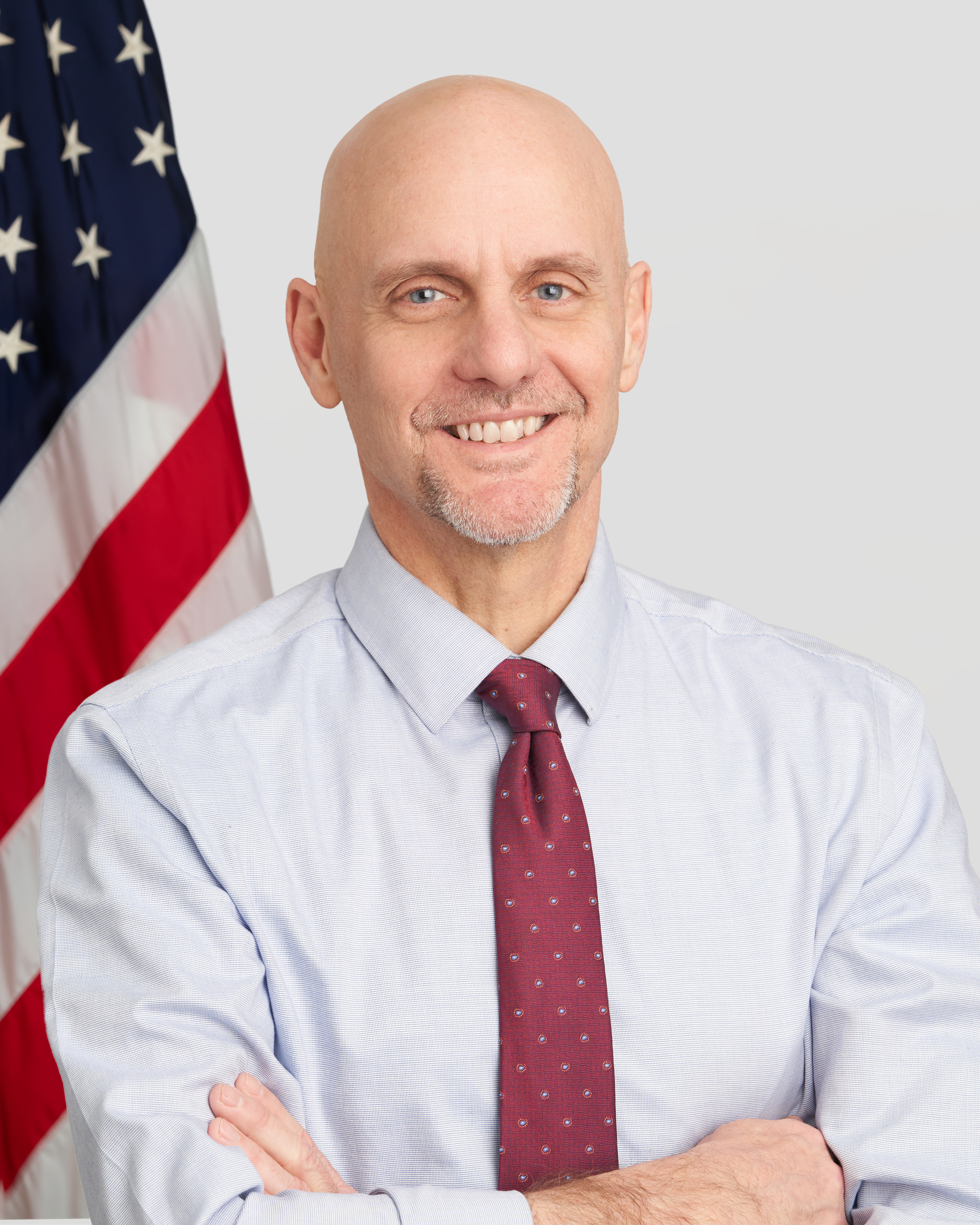
Stephen Hahn (1980), 24th commissioner of Food and Drugs (2019–2021)
