= Chiffon margarine =

One of the first soft, tub-style margarine products in the U.S

- Type: Spread
- Place of origin: United States
- Created by: Anderson, Clayton and Company
- Invented: 1954
- Main ingredients: hydrogenated cottonseed oil
- Variations: Sweet, unsalted
- Food energy (per 14 g serving): 100 kcal (420 kJ)
Nutritional value
(per 14 g serving)
- Protein: 0 g
- Fat: 11 g
- Carbohydrate: 0 g

Chiffon margarine is a brand of margarine. It was first manufactured in 1954 by Anderson, Clayton and Company, a cotton products firm of Houston, Texas. Chiffon was one of the first soft, tub-style margarine products. It was originally available in "regular", "sweet", and "unsalted" forms.

== Background and history ==
Anderson, Clayton and Company was founded in early 1905 by brothers-in-law Monroe Dunaway Anderson and William L. Clayton. Originally based in Oklahoma City, the firm moved its headquarters to Houston in 1916. There, it grew to be the world's largest cotton-trading enterprise. In 1952, the company had created a food division to research and find uses for hydrogenated cottonseed oil. The development of Chiffon margarine was one result.

The Chiffon name and product line has changed hands several times since; the first being in 1985, when Chiffon was sold to Kraft Foods. The Kraft U.S. and Canada tablespreads division subsequently became part of Nabisco in 1995; who then sold the brand to ConAgra Foods in 1998. Con-Agra discontinued domestic U.S. and Canadian distribution of Chiffon margarine in 2002. Chiffon margarine can still be purchased in the Caribbean region, however, where it is marketed by Seprod Ltd. Rights to Chiffon trademark are now held by Seprod.

== Marketing ==
The classic Chiffon ads from the D'Arcy Masius Benton & Bowles advertising agency ran during the 1970s and into the 1980s, featuring character actress Dena Dietrich as the iconic character Mother Nature. She likes Chiffon and identifies it as "my delicious butter!" The narrator (voiced by character actor Mason Adams) then tells her: "That's Chiffon margarine, not butter ... Chiffon's so delicious it fooled even you, Mother Nature." Vexed at the trickery, Mother Nature responds by uttering, in increasingly scornful tones, her signature line "It's not nice to fool Mother Nature", quickly followed by a flash of lightning, a peal of thunder, and occasionally an additional threat (such as silently commanding an elephant to charge the camera). The advertisements were typically closed by a jingle containing the lyrics, "If you think it's butter, but it's not: it's Chiffon."

== See also ==
- List of American advertising characters
