= Campus of Rice University =

College campus in Houston, Texas, US

Coordinates: 29.719°N 95.400°W

The campus of Rice University is located on a heavily wooded 290-acre (120-hectare) plot of land on South Main Street in the Museum District of Houston, Texas. It is located east of Rice Village, a retail district, south of Boulevard Oaks and Southampton, west of the Texas Medical Center, and north of Southgate.

Founded in 1912, the university has been developed in a relatively uniform Mediterranean Revival style, emphasizing light brick facades, quadrangles, archways, and decorative columns. There are notable exceptions to this style, including examples of brutalism and modern architecture. In recent decades, new buildings have also been constructed outside the original pentagonal campus, but nearly all academic and undergraduate residential facilities are still located there.

In addition to academic and administrative buildings, the Rice campus also includes the entirety of the residential college system, parking, recreational fields and facilities, concert halls, theatres, a student center, and sports facilities for the various Rice Owls athletic teams.

== History ==
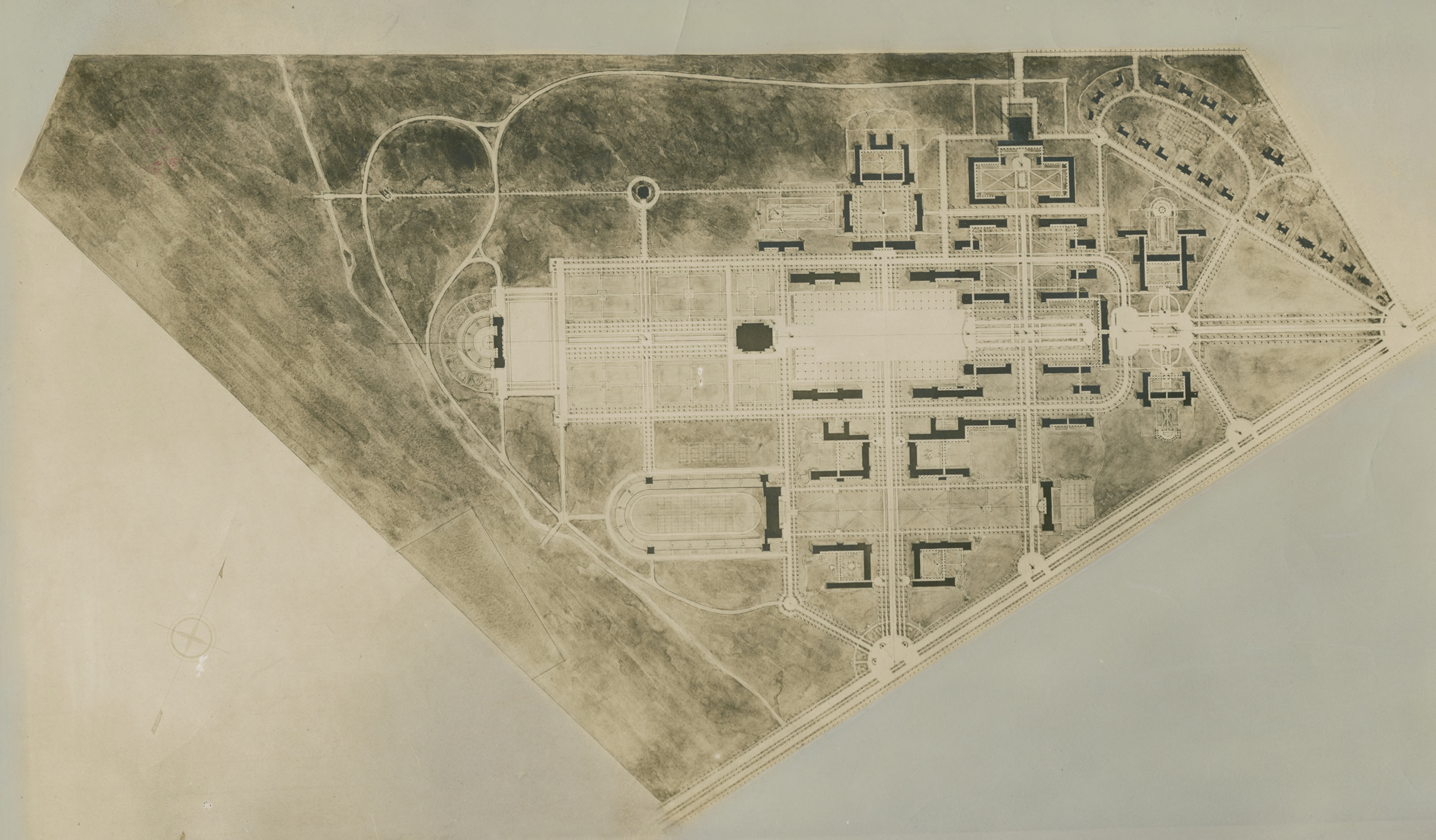
Master plan for the Rice Institute created by Cram, Goodhue and Ferguson in 1910.

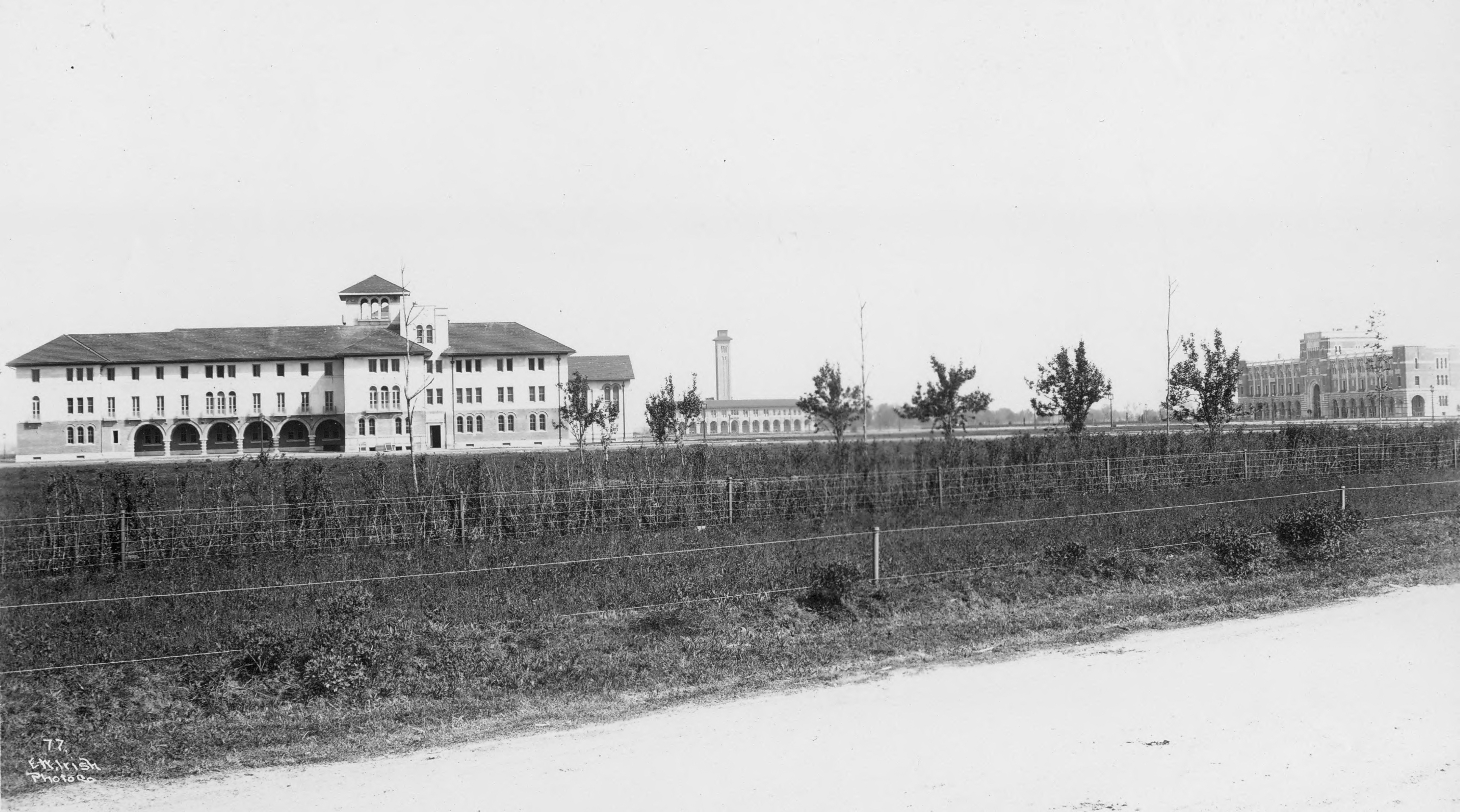
View of Rice Institute looking north from Main Street in 1912. A residential hall, today the Old Dorm of Will Rice College, can be seen at left, the Mechanical Laboratory in the background at center, and the Administration Building (Lovett Hall) at right.

Edgar Odell Lovett, the first President of Rice (then known as the William Marsh Rice Institute for the Advancement of Literature, Science, Art, Philosophy, and Letters), emphasized the need for a large campus with a uniform architectural plan during his first visit to Houston in 1907. After Lovett's selection as president in 1908, the Institute's leadership began searching for a contiguous plot of land up to 300 acres (120 hectares) in size on the outskirts of Houston. The existing property in and around Houston bequeathed to the Institute by its late benefactor, William Marsh Rice, was deemed unsuitable for the siting of the university – Rice Ranch, located near present-day Bellaire, was too far from Houston, while a plot of land near Downtown Houston was considered too small.

Lovett expressed interest in flat farmland along Main Street north of Brays Bayou. Negotiations by Captain James A. Baker eventually led to a complicated land exchange with local entrepreneur George Hermann (namesake of Hermann Park), who owned 370 acres (150 hectares) on both sides of Main Street. Through the deal and subsequent land exchanges, the Rice Institute had acquired 278 acres (113 hectares) fronting the west side of Main by 1910. The modern 290-acre (120-hectare) campus was not completed, however, until 1921, when a small parcel owned by DuPont was finally acquired.

In 1909, the Board of Trustees selected Ralph Adams Cram's firm, Cram, Goodhue, and Ferguson, to design the first five buildings and draft a master plan for the campus. The cornerstone of the Administration Building, now known as Lovett Hall, was laid in 1911. The early construction of the university was funded by the sale of timber interests on a 47,000-acre (19,000-hectare) piece of land in Louisiana owned by the Rice estate.

In 1910, the campus power plant (now the Mechanical Laboratory) was connected to the regional rail network by a spur line, and Baker successfully negotiated with Harris County and nearby landowners to widen and run a trolley line down Main Street.

In June 2020 Rice University bought the property of the bar Ginger Man, which closed the previous spring.

== Campus layout ==
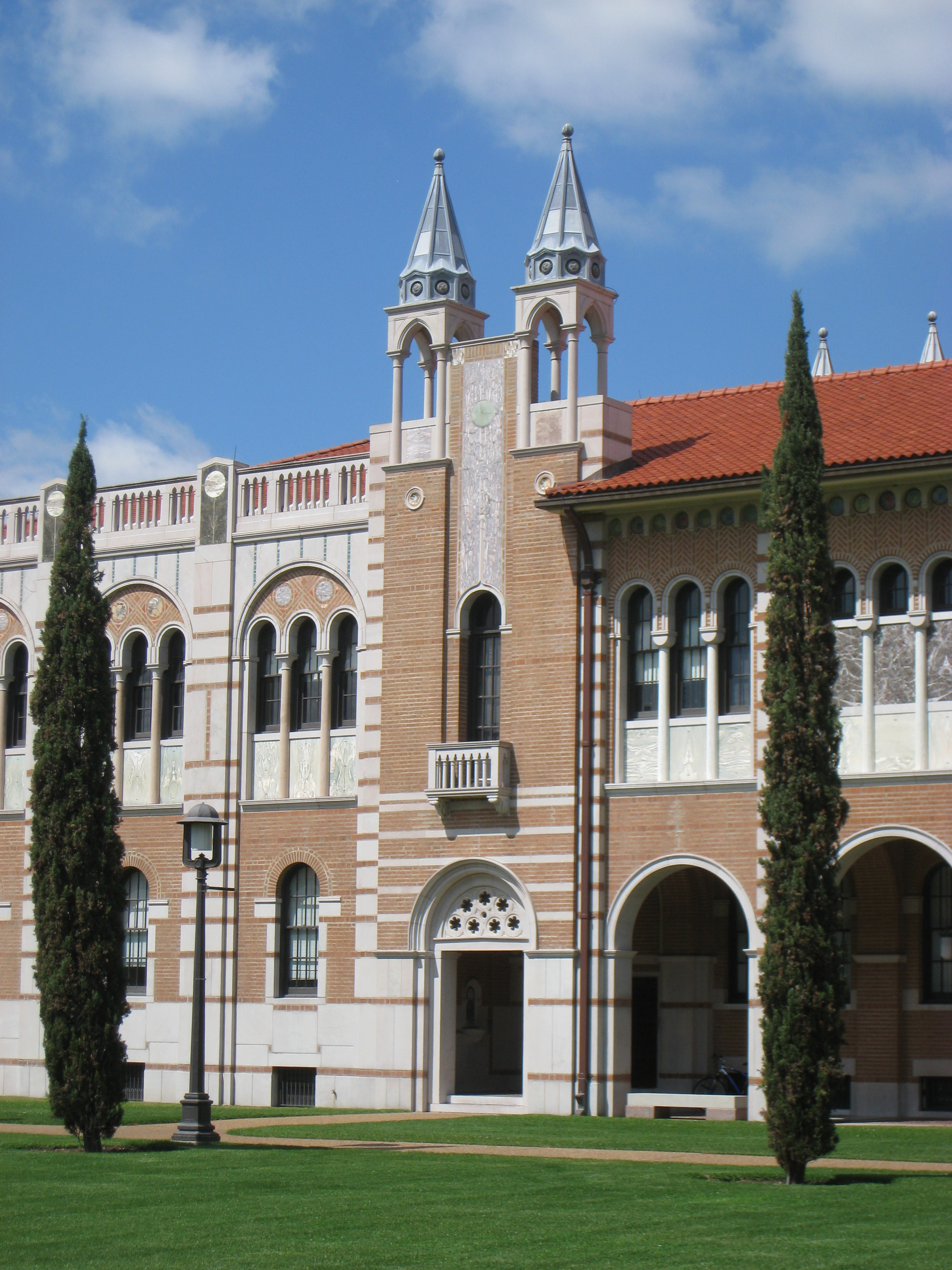
Herzstein Hall, in the Academic Quad

Rice's campus is a heavily-wooded 285-acre (1.15 km^{2}) tract of land located close to the city of West University Place in the museum district of Houston. Five streets demarcate the campus: Greenbriar Street, Rice Boulevard, Sunset Boulevard, Main Street, and University Boulevard. For most of its history, all of Rice's buildings have been contained within this pentagon. In recent years, new facilities have been built within the vicinity of campus, but the bulk of administrative, academic, and residential buildings are still located on the original plot of land. The BioScience Research Collaborative, all graduate student housing, and the Wiess President's House are located off-campus.

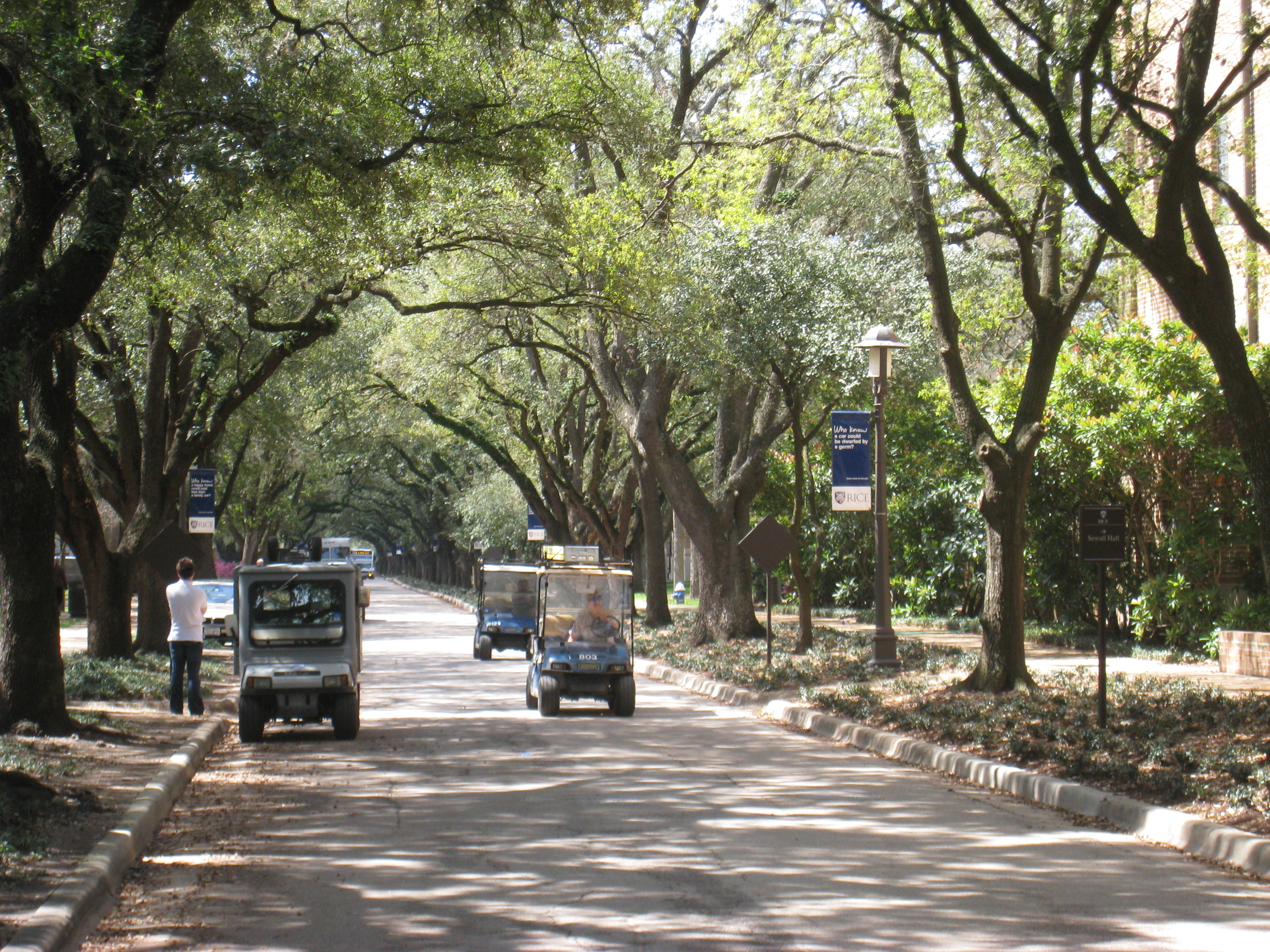
A view along the Inner Loop, with three of Rice's many golf carts in view

Transportation within the campus is facilitated by a small network of roads. The Inner Loop, a one-way ring road, begins at the southwestern corner of the Shepherd School of Music, proceeds east-northeast past the Southern Colleges and Fondren Library, makes a 90-degree turn, passes in front of Lovett Hall, makes another 90-degree turn, continues west-southwest past the Engineering Quadrangle, Rice Memorial Center (RMC), Jones School of Business, and Recreation Center, and ends at the Shepherd School. This rectangular road is bisected by Alumni Drive, which begins at Rice Boulevard along the northwestern edge of campus and passes by Dell Butcher Hall, the Recreation Center, the RMC, the Jones School, the Baker Institute, and Wiess College before ending at Main Street. Other shorter roads connect to various campus entrances, laboratories, and sports facilities.

A majority of parking on campus is concentrated at the western end of the pentagon in the form of surface parking. Approximately 30 acres (12 hectares) of asphalt parking surrounds First Community Stadium; West Lots 1–5 are east of the stadium and Greenbriar Lot is west. A majority of residential, visitor, and faculty parking is located here; other, smaller parking lots are scattered throughout the campus, as well as two parking garages: one underneath the Jones School and another currently under construction adjacent to Lovett College.

Rice prides itself on the amount of green space available on campus; there are only about 50 buildings spread between the main entrance at its easternmost corner, and the parking lots and First Community Stadium at the west end. The Lynn R. Lowrey Arboretum, consisting of more than 4,000 trees and shrubs (giving birth to the legend that Rice has a tree for every student), is spread throughout the campus. Because of the management of its trees on campus, Rice earned the status as a "Tree Campus USA" from the Arbor Day Foundation four times since 2012.

The university's first president, Edgar Odell Lovett, intended for the campus to have a uniform architecture style to improve its aesthetic appeal. Influenced by the campuses of southern Europe, many of Rice's buildings are Mediterranean Revival in style, with sand and pink-colored bricks, large archways and columns acting as architectural motifs. Noteworthy exceptions include the glass-walled Brochstein Pavilion, Lovett College with its Brutalist-style concrete gratings, the eclectic-Mediterranean Duncan Hall, and the modern Moody Center for the Arts.

=== Quadrangles ===
A stone bench in the academic quad, with Lovett Hall visible in the background

The campus is organized around a number of quadrangles. The Academic Quadrangle, anchored by a statue of founder William Marsh Rice, includes Ralph Adams Cram's asymmetrical Lovett Hall, the original administrative building, to the east; Fondren Library to the west; Herzstein Hall, which was formerly the physics building and includes a large amphitheater, which was (when first built) the largest amphitheater on campus, to the northeast; Sewall Hall for the social sciences and arts to the southeast; Rayzor Hall, for the languages, to the southwest; and Anderson Hall of the School of Architecture to the northwest. The Humanities Building is located behind the southwestern corner of the Academic Quad, adjacent to Fondren Library and Rayzor Hall.

The Central Quadrangle lies to the west of Fondren Library, anchored by Brochstein Pavilion, a coffee shop and meeting space. Constructed in 2008, the glass pavilion features indoor and outdoor seating spaces, designed to revitalize the once-underused area. This area (the Central Quadrangle) is bounded by the Rice Memorial Center and Ley Student Center to the north and Herring Hall, designed by César Pelli, to the south.

Further west lies the West Quadrangle, surrounded by McNair Hall of the Jones Business School to the north, the Baker Institute to the south, and Alice Pratt Brown Hall of the Shepherd School of Music to the west. The eastern section of the quad adjoining Alumni Drive contains Jamail Plaza, donated by Lee Hage Jamail, wife of prominent attorney Joe Jamail, which includes a large globe-shaped fountain and public space connecting the Baker Institute to the Jones School.

In the Engineering Quadrangle, located north of the Inner Loop and west of Duncan College, a trinity of sculptures by Michael Heizer, collectively entitled 45°, 90°, 180°, are flanked by Abercrombie Laboratory to the east, the Cox Mechanical Engineering Building to the west, and the Mechanical Laboratory to the north. Ryon Laboratory and Keck Hall also frame this quadrangle at the northwestern and southwestern corners, respectively. Duncan Hall is the latest addition to this quad, housing offices, classrooms, labs, and lecture halls for the Electrical Engineering, Computer Science, and Statistics departments.

=== Residential colleges ===
Roughly three-quarters of Rice's undergraduate population lives on campus. Housing is divided among eleven residential colleges, which form an integral part of student life at the university. The colleges are named for historical figures of and benefactors to the university. While there is significant variation in their appearance, facilities, and dates of founding, the colleges are an important source of identity for Rice students, functioning as dining halls, residence halls, and sports teams, among other roles. Each residential college, with the exception of Sid Richardson, possesses its own quadrangle, which provides a dedicated outdoor social and recreational space for members. Rice does not have or endorse a greek system, with the residential college system taking its place.

Five colleges – McMurtry, Duncan, Martel, Jones, and Brown – are located on the north side of campus, northeast of Lovett Hall. Six more colleges – Baker, Will Rice, Lovett, Hanszen, Sid Richardson, and Wiess – are located south of the Inner Loop and Academic Quadrangle. The south colleges are organized with respect to a pair of axes outlined in the original plan of the university. An east-west axis runs from Hanszen to Will Rice, while a north-south axis runs from the Inner Loop to Sid Richardson. The north-south axis contains the John and Anne Grove, a wide decomposed granite promenade covered by a thick canopy of cedar elm and oak trees.

=== Graduate housing ===
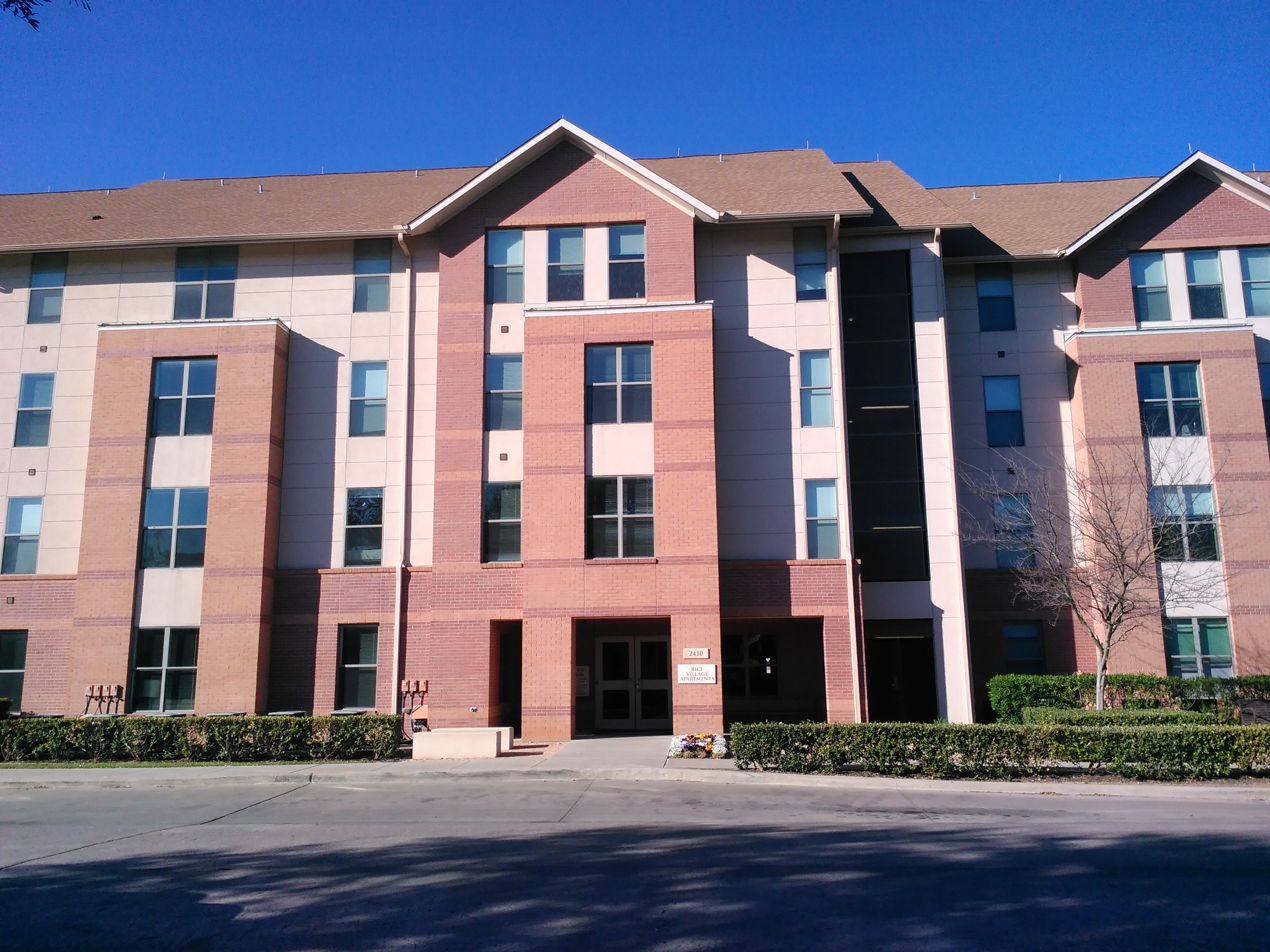
Rice Village Apartments

Rice provides off-campus housing for graduate students at two apartment complexes. Rice Graduate Apartments (RGA), constructed in 1999, is a 220-unit garden apartment complex located on Bissonnet Street north of campus. Rice Village Apartments (RVA), constructed in 2010, is a 137-unit mid-rise building located west of campus on Shakespeare Street in Rice Village. Both complexes are served by the university shuttle system, and Rice Village Apartments (which is a LEED-certified green building) discourages car use by providing new residents with a free bicycle.

Rice Village Apartments, the designated unit for families, is within the Houston Independent School District. Residents are zoned to Roberts Elementary School, Pershing Middle School (with Pin Oak Middle School as an option), and Lamar High School.

Previously the university had another graduate housing complex, Morningside Square Apartments, which had rooms larger than the other complexes and was also designed for families. Morningside Square had 54 units. The university purchased Morningside Square from Geoprime Properties in 2001. It closed and the municipal demolition permits were issued in 2017.

=== Sports facilities ===
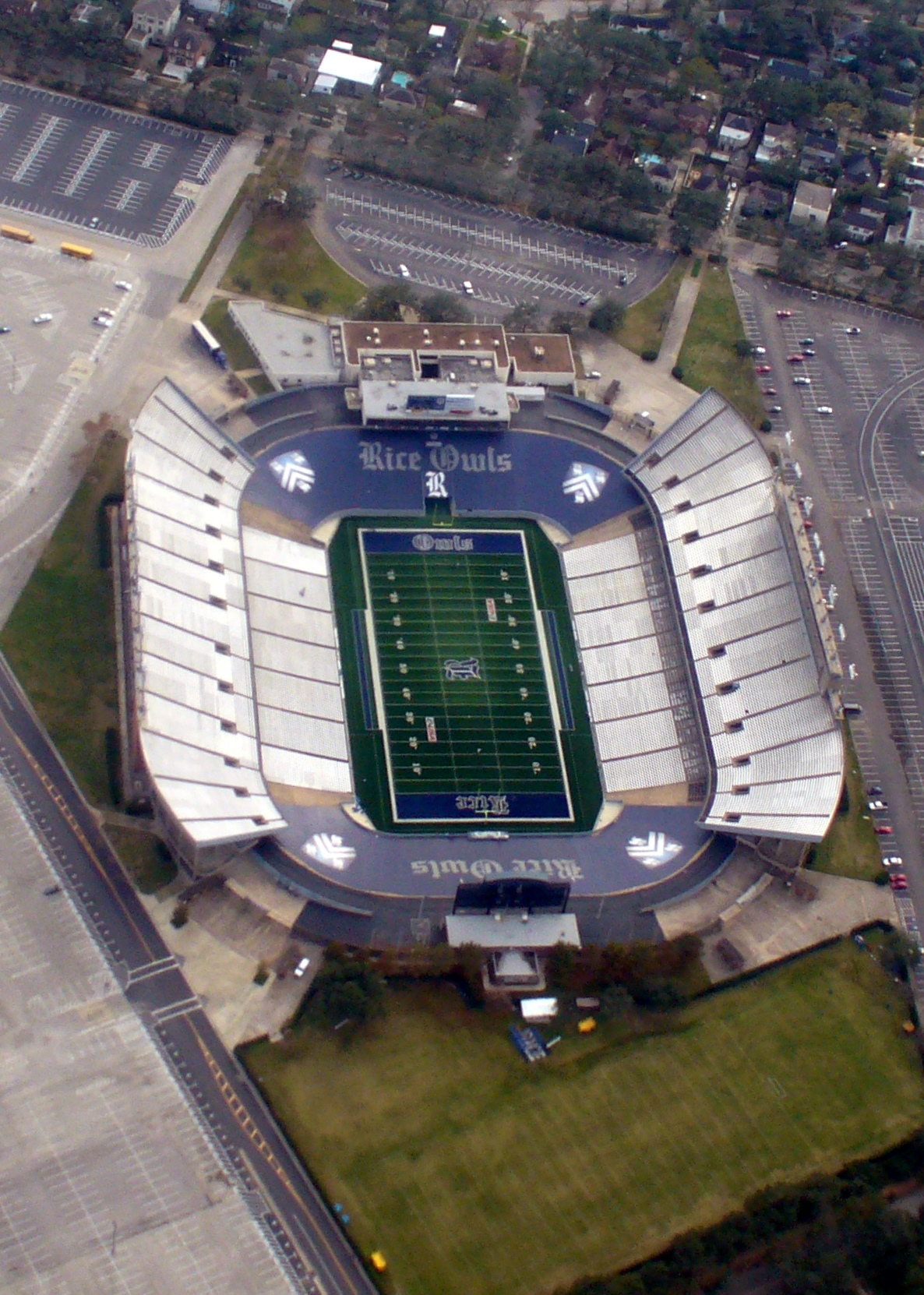
An overhead view of First Community Stadium in 2009, where the Owls play their home football games

The on-campus football facility, First Community Stadium, opened in 1950 with a capacity of 70,000 seats. In 2006, seating capacity was reduced to 47,000 by covering areas at each end of the field with tarps. Seating capacity was permanently reduced by the construction of the Brian Patterson Sports Performance Center in 2015, which occupies a formerly-tarped seating area behind the north endzone. The new 60,000-square-foot (5,600 m^{2}) facility, completed in 2016, replaces dated training facilities elsewhere on campus and includes a large new scoreboard mounted to its roof. Rice Stadium was the site of a speech by President John F. Kennedy, "Address at Rice University on the Nation's Space Effort", on September 12, 1962, in which he challenged the nation to send a man to the moon by the end of the decade. In 1974, the stadium hosted Super Bowl VIII.

Reckling Park, located south of Tudor Fieldhouse along University Boulevard, is the home of Rice Owls baseball. Opened in 2000, the stadium has a capacity of over 7,000.

Tudor Fieldhouse, known as Autry Court prior to 2007, is home to the basketball and volleyball teams. Other stadia include the Wendel D. Ley Track & Holloway Field and the George R. Brown Tennis Center. The 120,000-square-foot (11,000 m^{2}), 14-court Tennis Center, located east of First Community Stadium along Rice Boulevard, opened in 2014; it replaced the Jake Hess Tennis Center adjacent to Recking Park, which became the site of the Moody Center for the Arts in 2017.

The Barbara and David Gibbs Recreation & Wellness Center, opened in 2009, is a 103,000-square-foot (9,600 m^{2}) facility featuring a 9,000-square-foot (840 m^{2}) weight and cardio room, multipurpose fitness and dance rooms, indoor and outdoor basketball, racquetball and squash courts, a soccer and hockey arena, an Olympic-size competitive swimming pool, a recreational pool, and offices for counseling and wellbeing services. The complex was designed by SmithGroupJJR and LakeFlato Architects.

=== Other facilities ===
In 1994, the university and Houston Independent School District jointly established The Rice School, a kindergarten through 8th grade public magnet school, in the neighborhood of Braeswood Place south of campus.

== Buildings ==
=== Academic ===
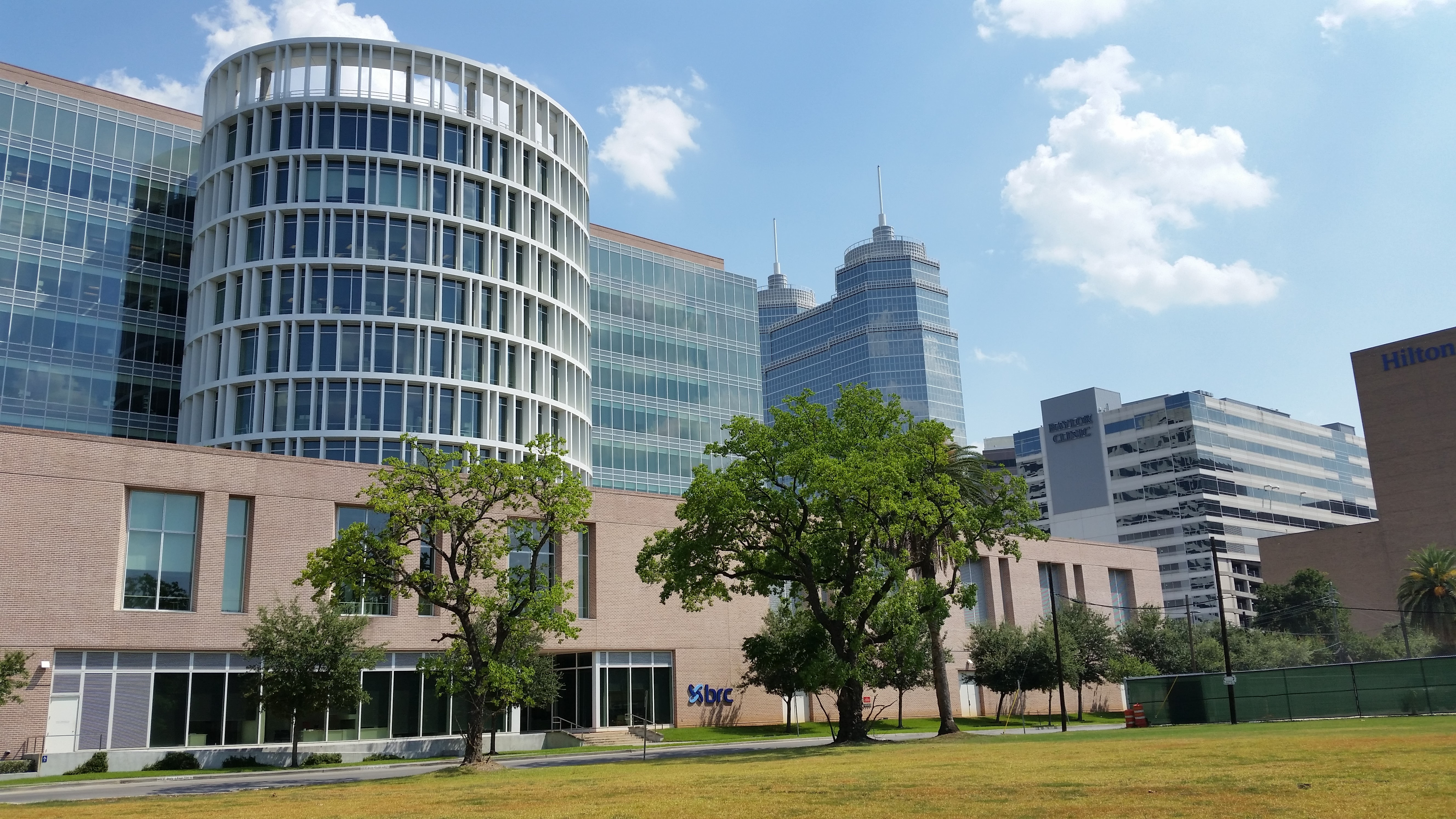
BioScience Research Collaborative

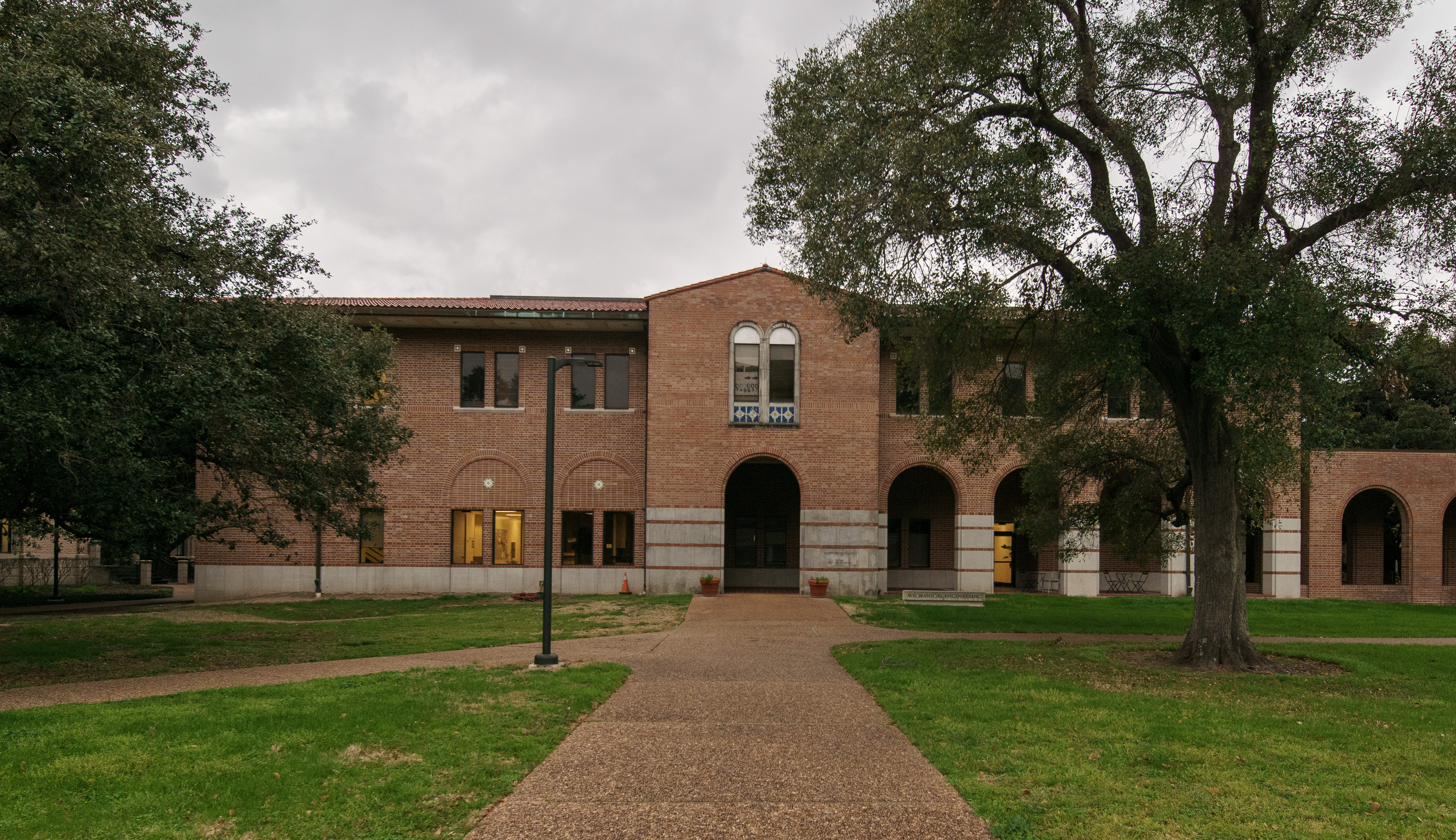
Cox Mechanical Engineering

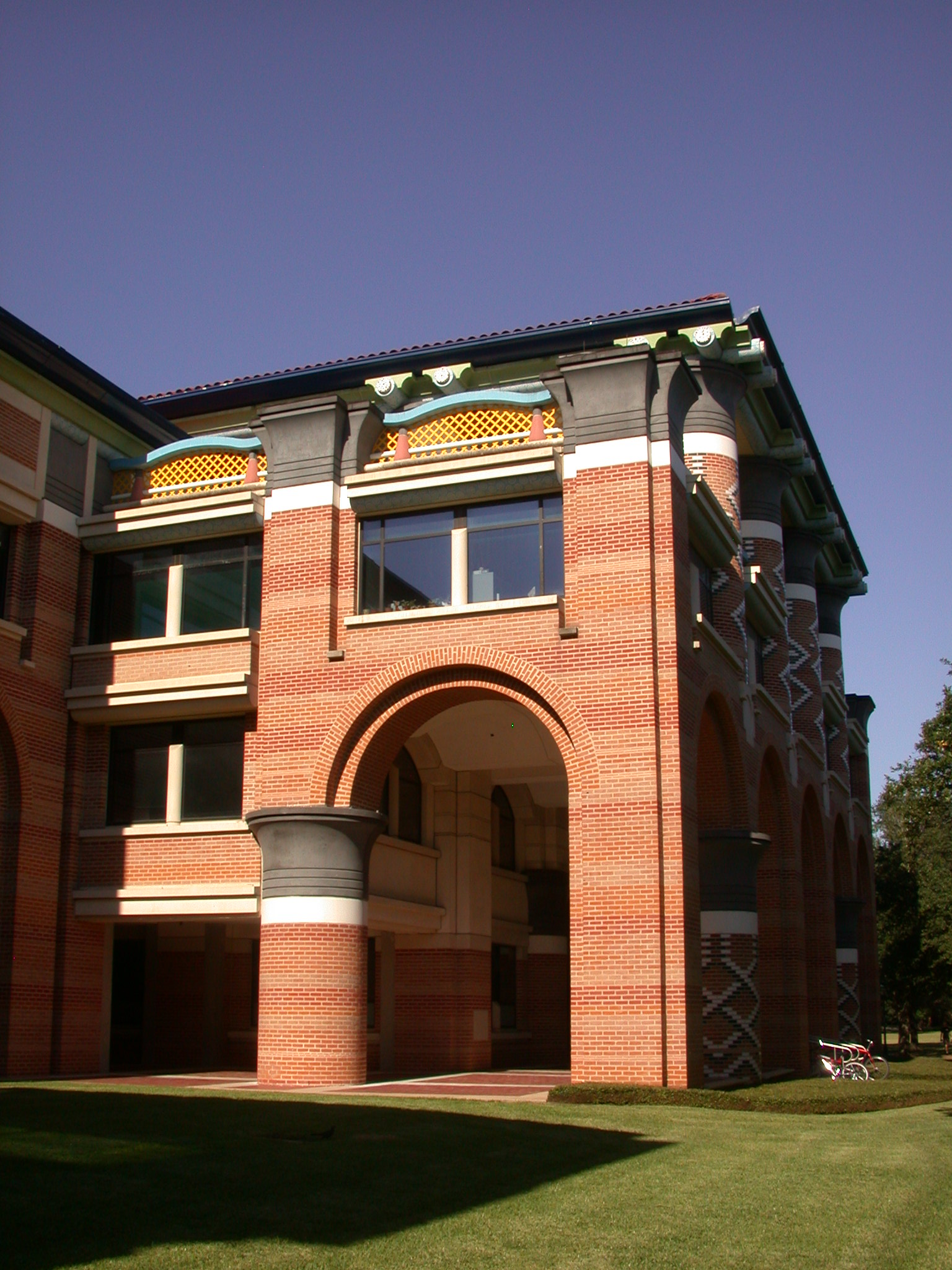
Duncan Hall

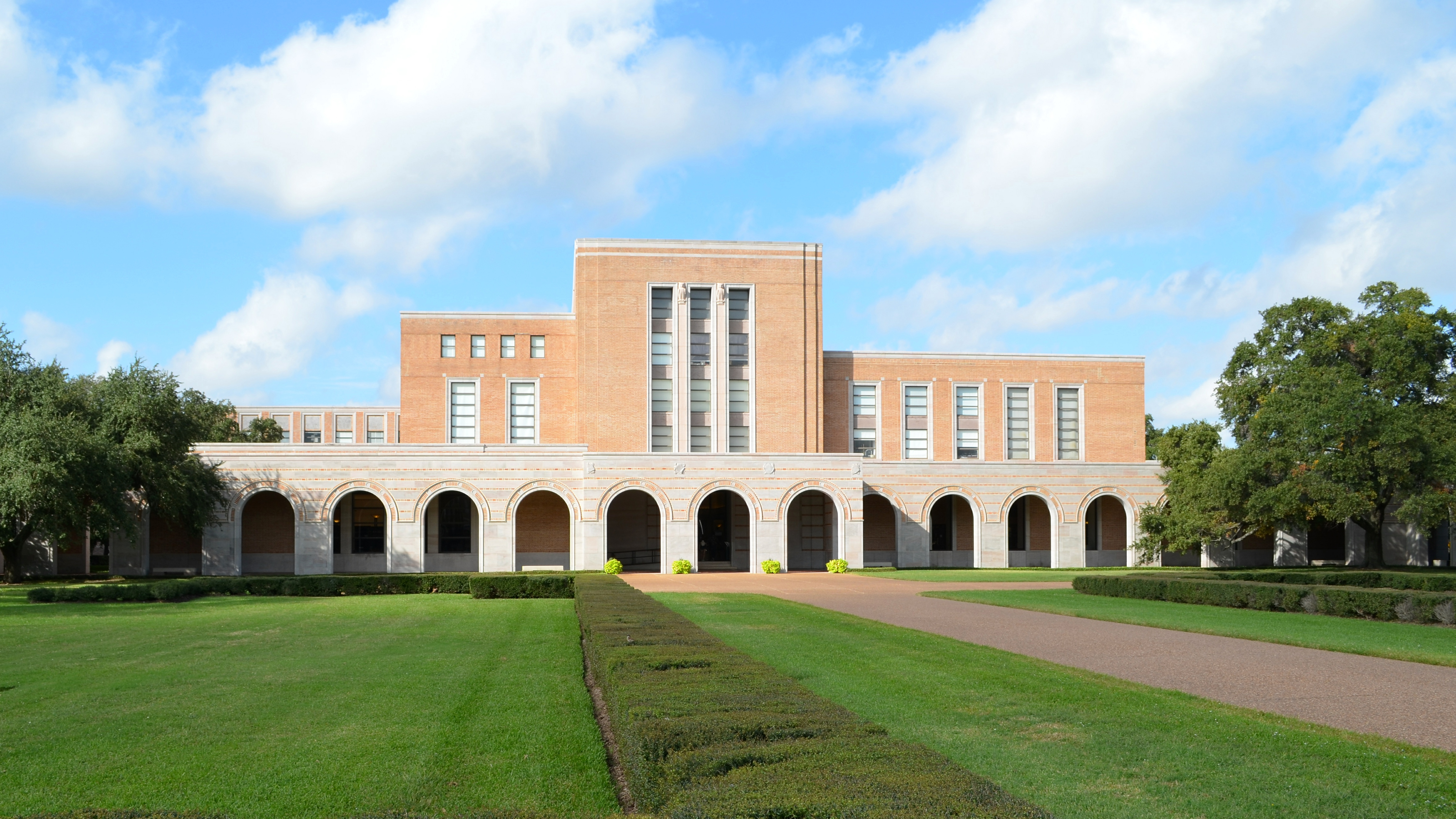
Fondren Library

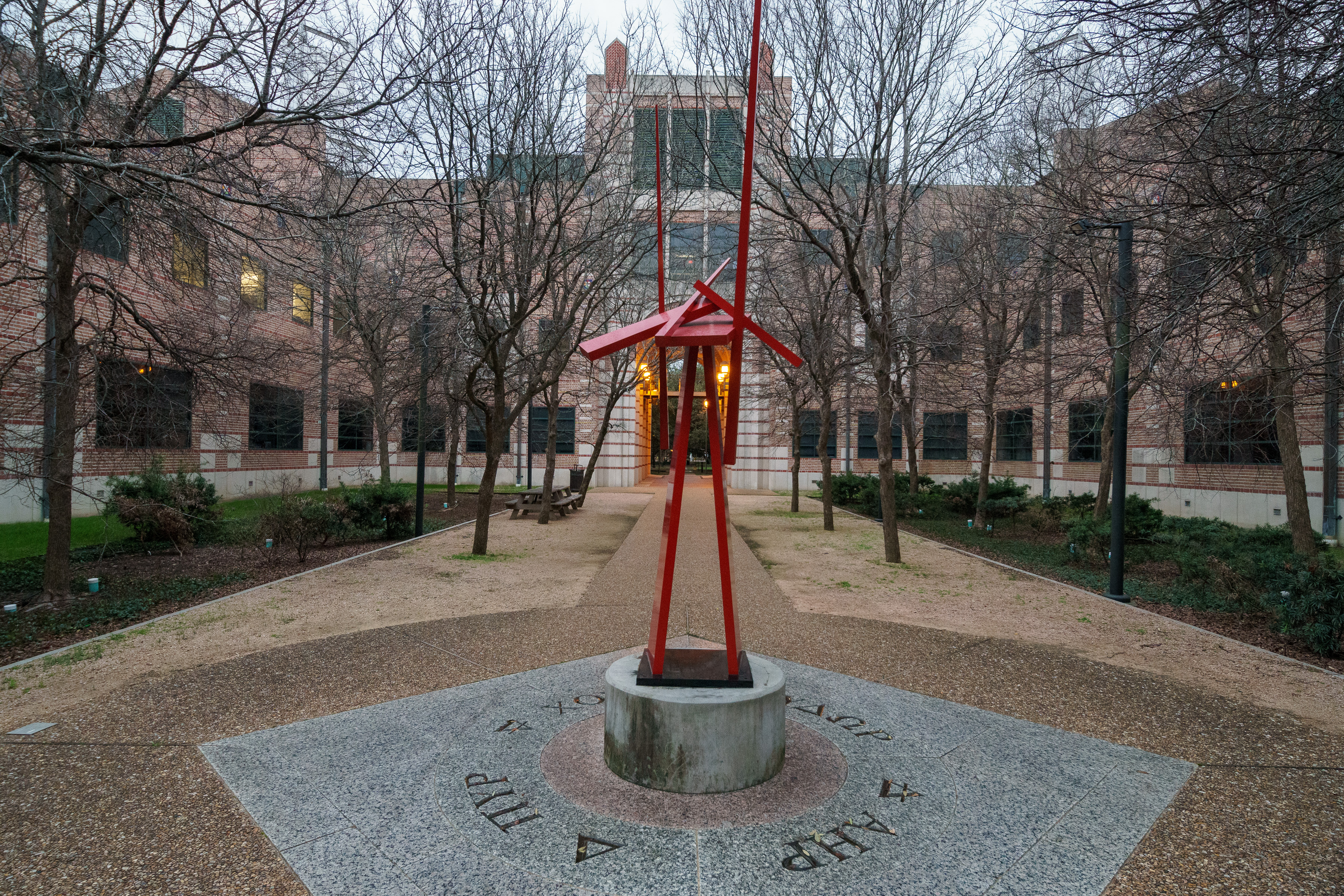
George R. Brown Hall

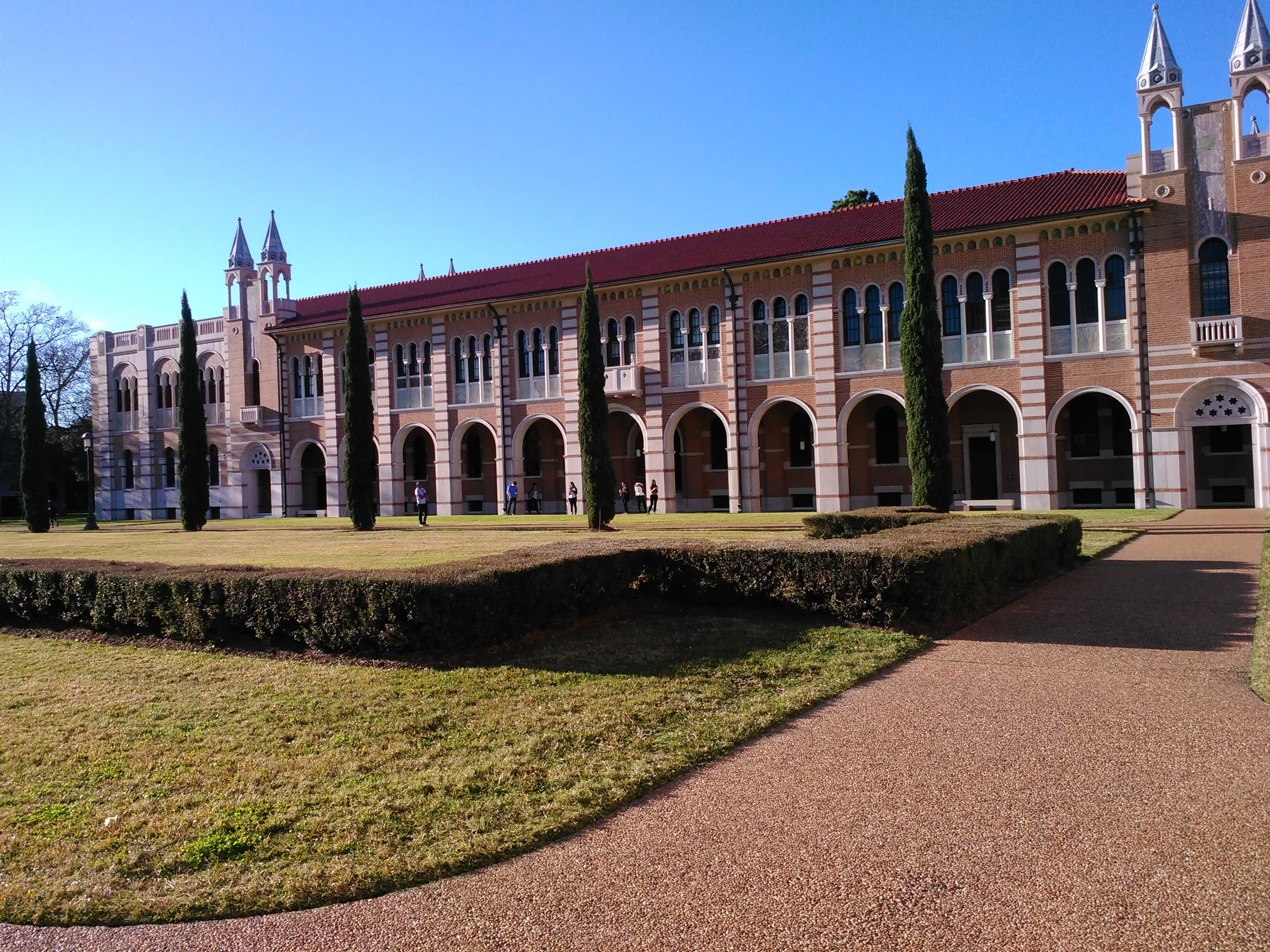
Herzstein Hall

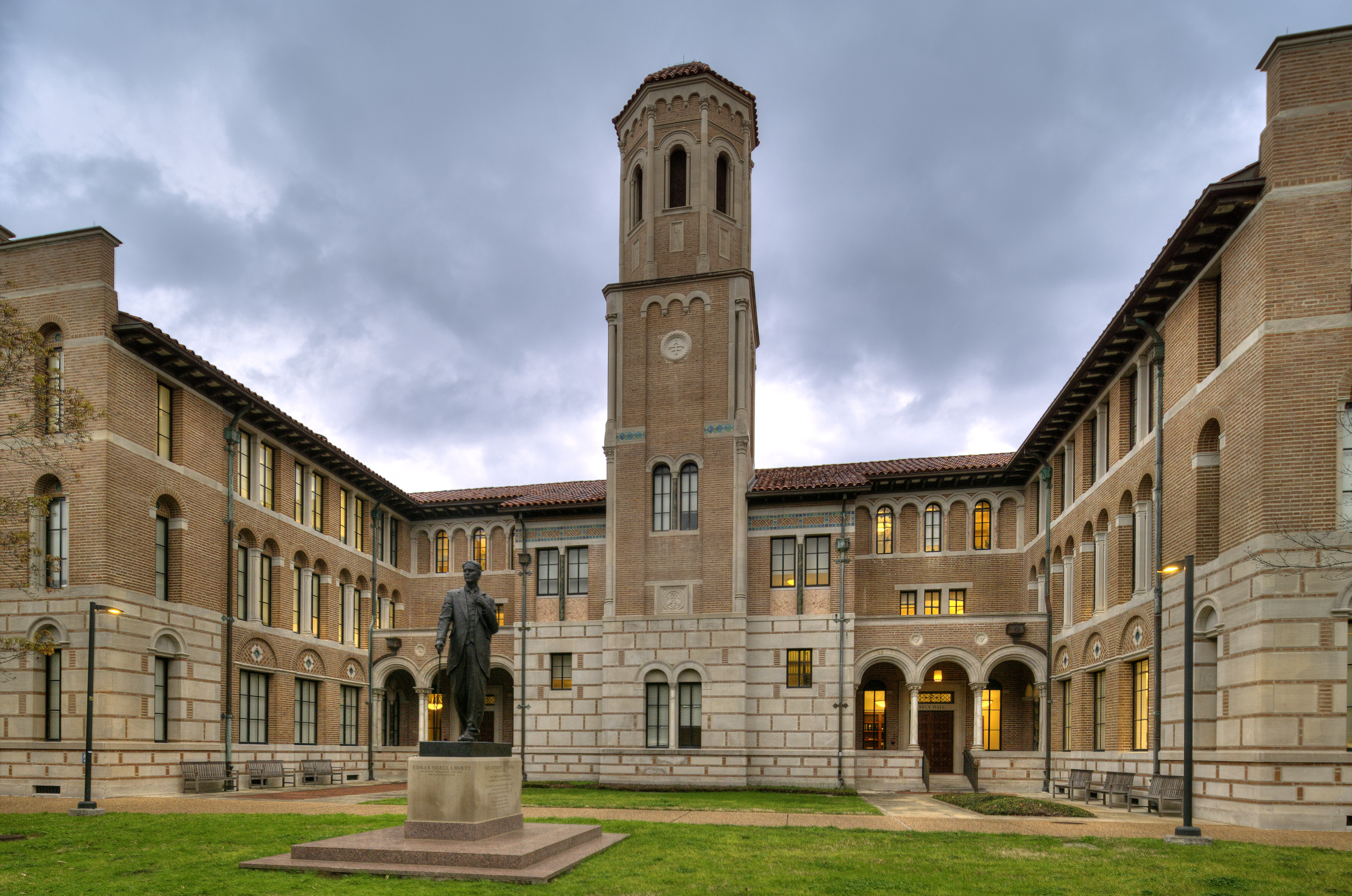
Keck Hall

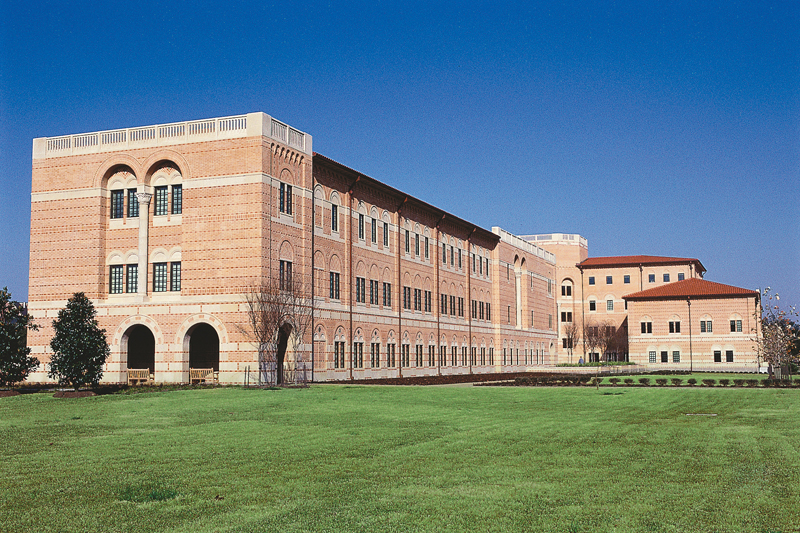
McNair Hall

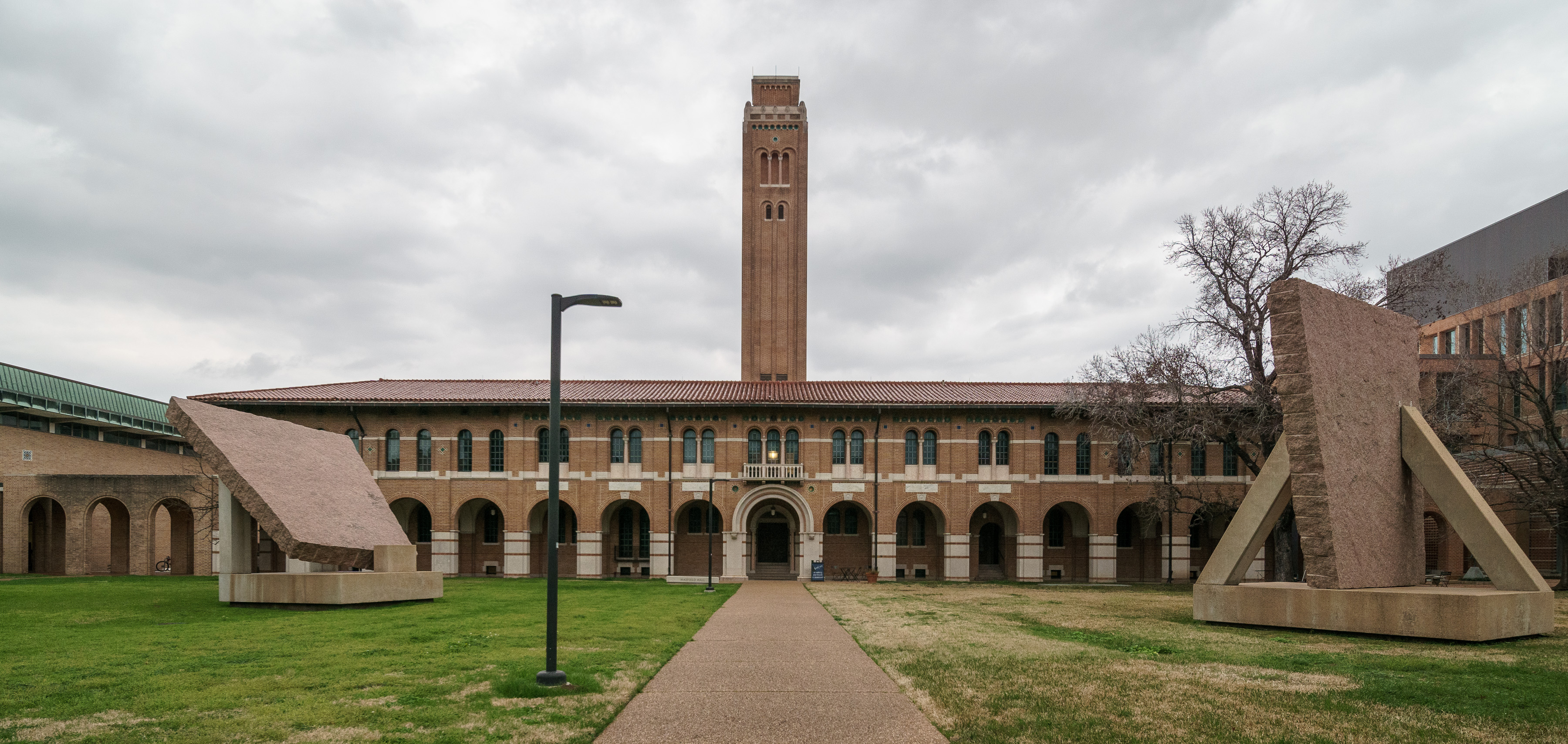
Mechanical Lab

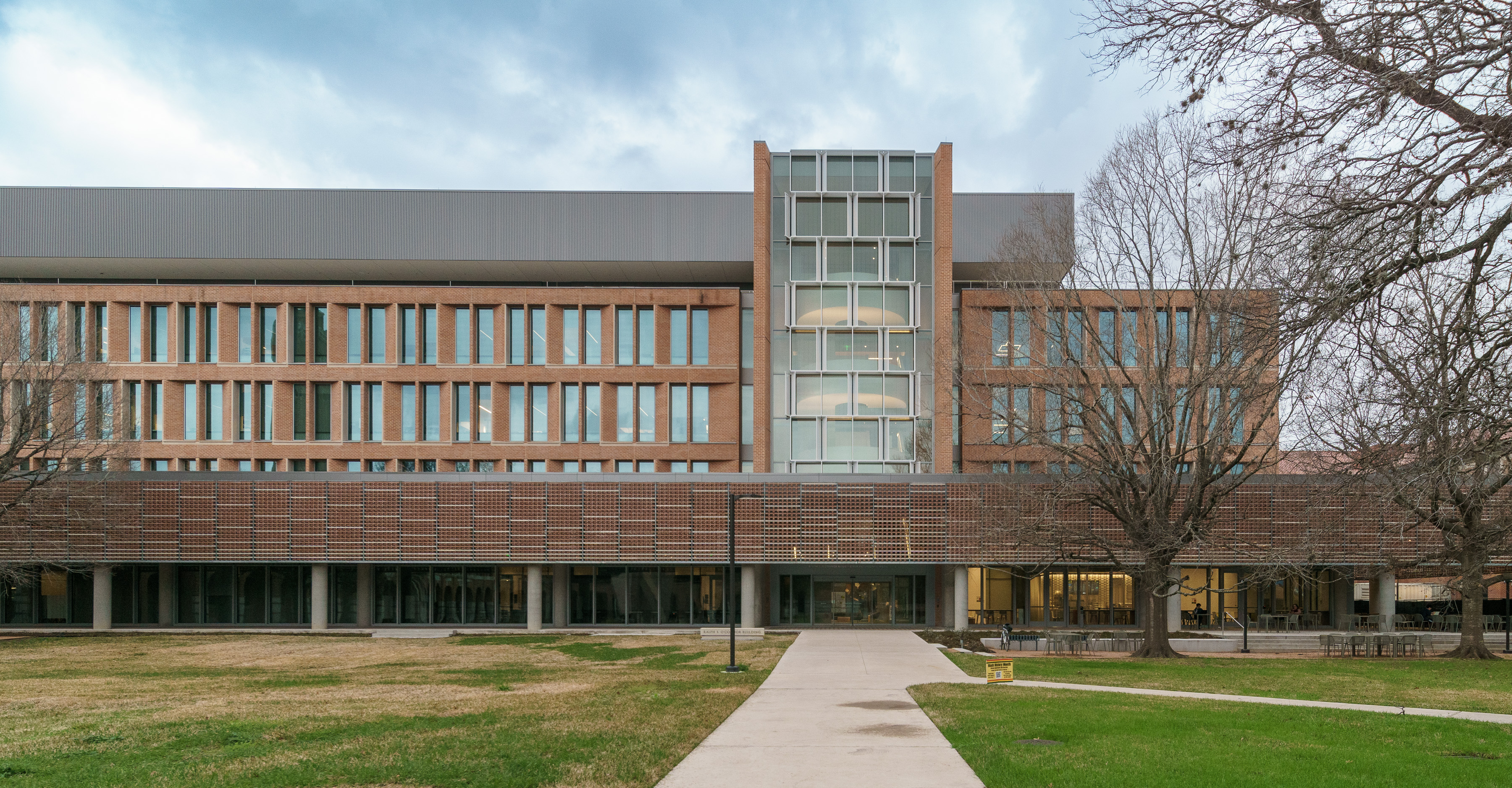
O'Connor Building

| Name | Date of Construction | Namesake | Contents |
|---|---|---|---|
| Abercrombie Laboratory | 1948 | Lilly Frank and J.S. Abercrombie, former president of Cameron International | Home of the Department of Electrical and Computer Engineering and portions of Biochemical Engineering and Civil and Environmental Engineering |
| Alice Pratt Brown Hall | 1991 | Alice Pratt Brown, wife of George R. Brown | Home of the Shepherd School of Music |
| Anderson Biological Laboratory | 1958 | Monroe D. Anderson, of Anderson, Clayton and Company | |
| Anderson Hall | 1947 | Monroe D. Anderson, of Anderson, Clayton and Company | Home of the Rice University School of Architecture |
| Anderson-Clarke Center | 2014 | D. Kent and Linda C. Anderson and Robert L. and Jean T. Clarke | Home of the Glasscock School of Continuing Studies |
| Baker Hall | 1997 | James Baker, former Secretary of State | Home of the James A. Baker III Institute for Public Policy |
| BioScience Research Collaborative | 2009 | | Located off-campus in the Texas Medical Center. Contains various laboratories; offices for Departments of Bioengineering, Biosciences, Chemical and Biomolecular Engineering, Chemistry, Electrical and Computer Engineering, Physics and Astronomy, Psychology |
| Brockman Hall for Physics | 2011 | A. Eugene Brockman | Home of the Departments of Physics and Astronomy |
| William T. Cannady Hall | 2024 | William T. Cannady, longtime Rice Professor | Addition to the Rice University School of Architecture. Contains fabrication lab, student and faculty workspaces, and exhibition space. |
| Cox Mechanical Engineering Building | 1985 | John L. Cox, Rice trustee | Home of the Department of Mechanical Engineering |
| Dell Butcher Hall | 1997 | E. Dell Butcher, president of American Commercial Lines | Home of the Smalley-Curl Institute for nanotechnology |
| Duncan Hall | 1996 | Charles Duncan, former Secretary of Energy | Home of the Department of Computational Engineering |
| Fondren Library | 1949 | Walter Fondren Sr., co-founder of Humble Oil | Main campus library |
| George R. Brown Hall | 1991 | George R. Brown | Home of the George R. Brown School of Engineering |
| Hamman Hall | 1958 | George Hamman | 466-seat proscenium theatre |
| Herman Brown Hall | 1968 | Herman Brown, founder of KBR | Home of the Department of Mathematics |
| Robert R. Herring Hall | 1984 | Robert R. Herring, former CEO of Houston Natural Gas | Home of the Departments of Art History, English, and Linguistics, and the Humanities Research Center |
| Herzstein Hall | 1914 | Albert and Ethel Avis Herzstein | Home of the Department of Political Science |
| Humanities Building | 2000 | | Home of the School of Humanities and Departments of History, Philosophy, and Religion, and the Center for Women, Gender, and Sexuality |
| Keck Hall | 1925 | William Myron Keck | Home of the Department of Civil and Environmental Engineering |
| Keith-Wiess Geological Laboratories | 1958 | Harry C. and Olga Keith Wiess; the former founded Humble Oil | Home of the Department of Earth Sciences |
| McNair Hall | 2002 | Bob McNair, owner of the Houston Texans | Home of the Jesse H. Jones Graduate School of Business |
| Mechanical Laboratory | 1912 | | Home of the Chao Center for Asian Studies and portions of Mechanical Engineering and Civil and Environmental Engineering |
| Moody Center for the Arts | 2017 | William Lewis Moody Jr. and his wife Libbie Shearn Rice Moody | |
| O'Connor Building for Engineering and Science | 2023 | Ralph S. O'Connor, trustee | Home of Rice Advanced Materials Institute |
| Oshman Engineering Design Kitchen (OEDK) | 2009 | M. Kenneth Oshman, founder of ROLM | Undergraduate engineering workspace |
| Rayzor Hall | 1962 | J. Newton Rayzor | Home of the Department of Classical and European Studies and the Department of Spanish, Portuguese and Latin American Studies. Also contains office of the Spanish Ministry of Education's Houston Resource Center (Consejería de Educación Centro de Recursos de Houston). |
| Rice Media Center | 1969 | | Houses portion of the Department of Visual and Dramatic Arts |
| Ryon Engineering Laboratory | 1965 | Mae E. and Lewis B. Ryon, Jr. | Houses portion of the Department of Civil and Environmental Engineering and the Department of Mechanical Engineering |
| Seeley G. Mudd Computer Science Laboratory | 1983 | Seeley Greenleaf Mudd, cardiologist | Home of the Office of Information Technology |
| Sewall Hall | 1971 | Cleveland Sewall | Home of the Departments of Anthropology, Psychology, and Sociology; former home of the Rice Gallery |
| Space Science Building | 1966 | | Home of the Department of Chemistry |

=== Administrative ===
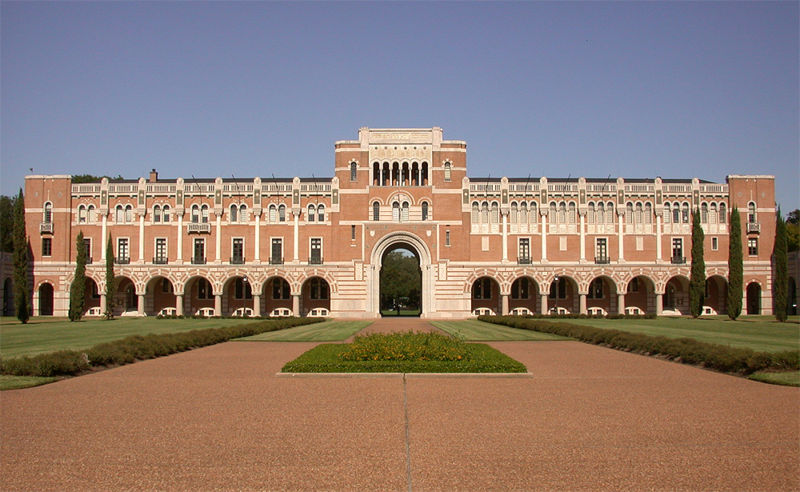
Lovett Hall

| Name | Date of Construction | Namesake | Contents |
|---|---|---|---|
| Allen Center | 1967 | Helen Daniels and Herbert C. Allen; former was president of Cameron International | Administrative offices, including the office of the President |
| Cohen House | 1927 | Agnes Lord and Robert I. Cohen | Private events space and dining hall for Faculty Club |
| Greenbriar Building | | | Offices for Development and Alumni Relations |
| Huff House | 1949 | Peter Huff, founder of Dynamco, and Nancy Larson Huff | Association of Rice Alumni; Center for Career Development |
| Lovett Hall | 1912 | Edgar Odell Lovett | Administrative offices, including Office of Admission and Dean of Undergraduates |
| Rice University Police Department | 1987 | | Rice University Police Department |
| Wiess President's House | 1920 | Harry Carothers Wiess, founder of Humble Oil | Home of the president of the university |

=== Residential ===
Martel College rotunda

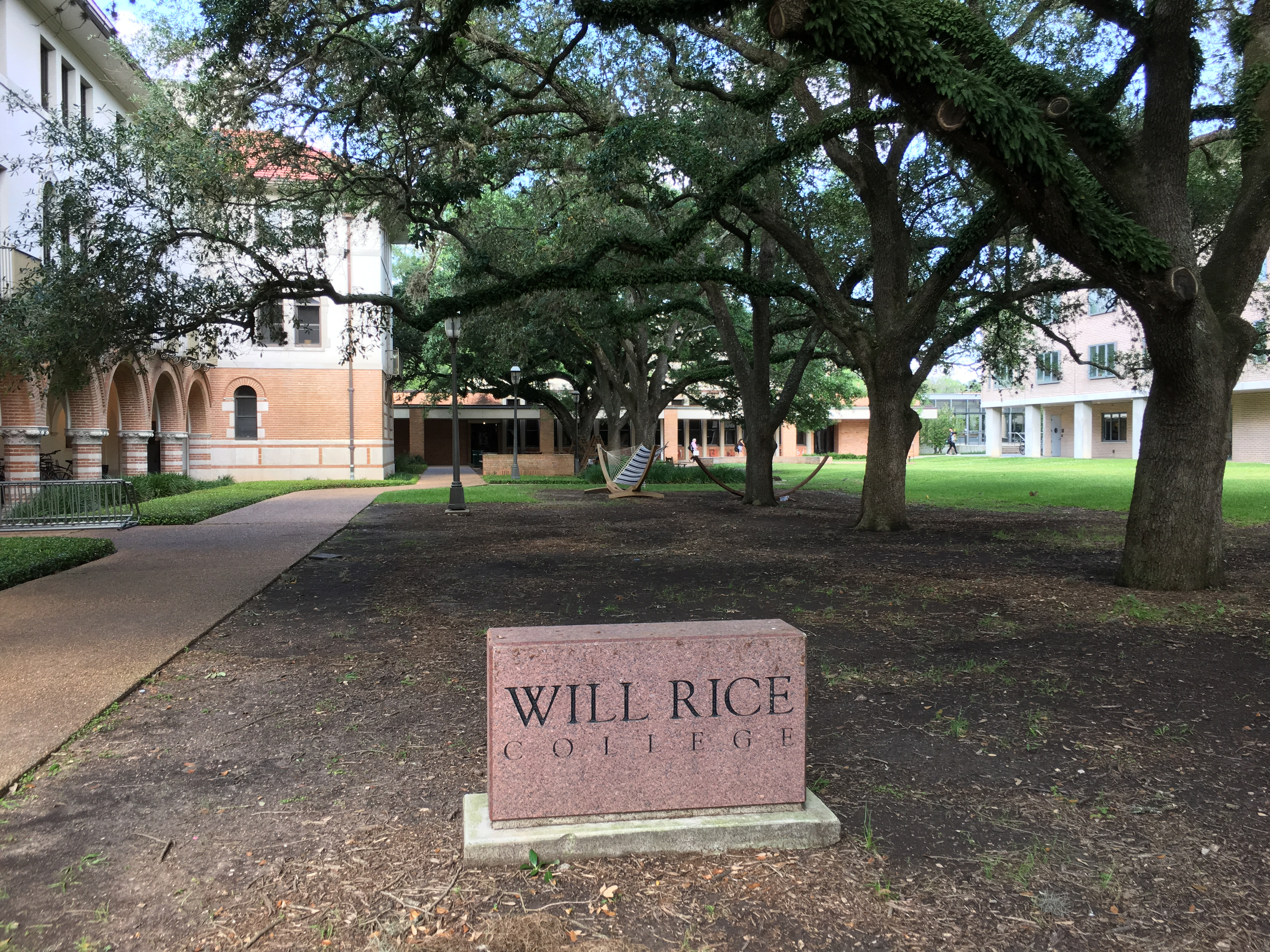
Will Rice College

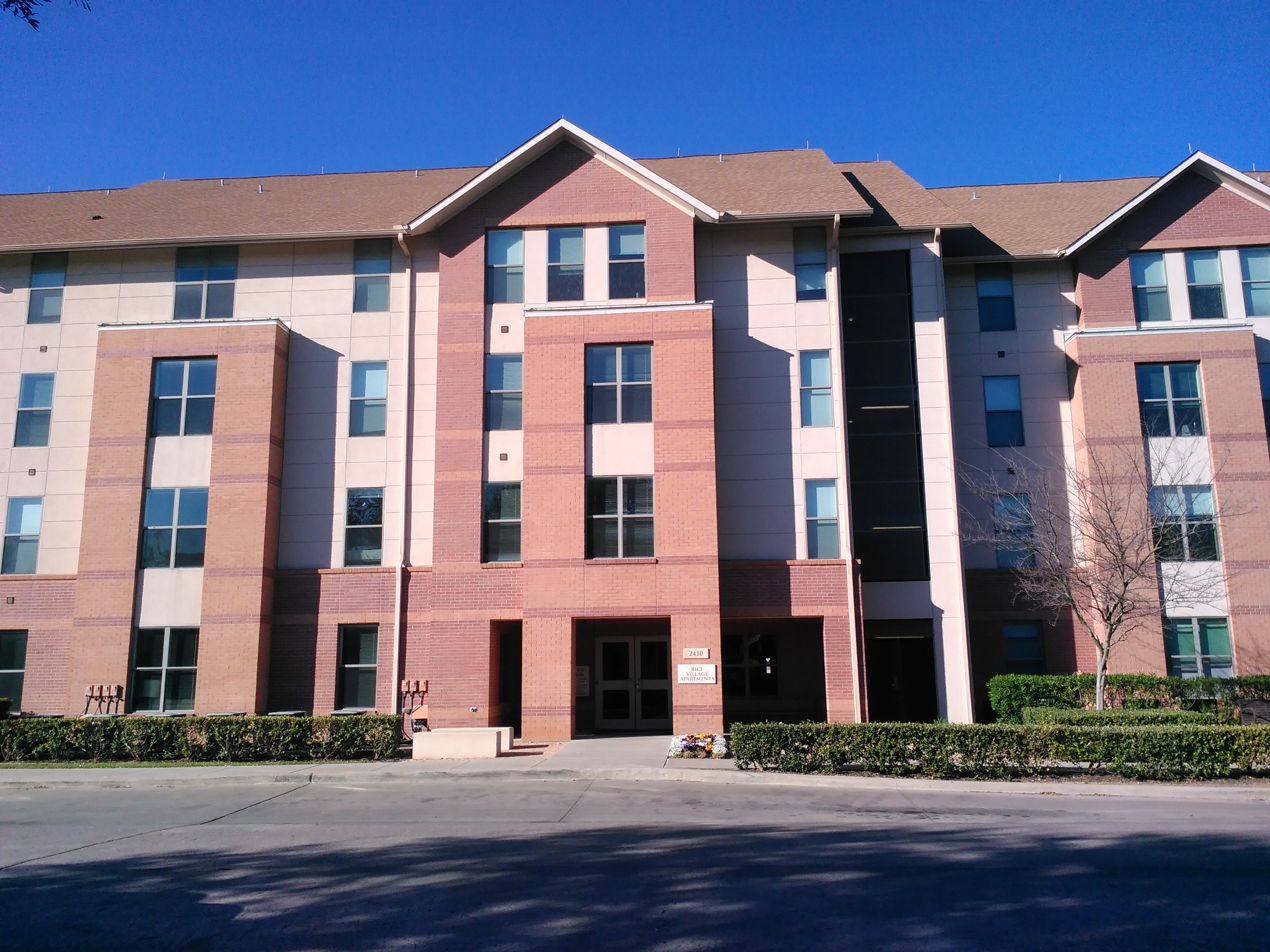
Rice Village Apartments

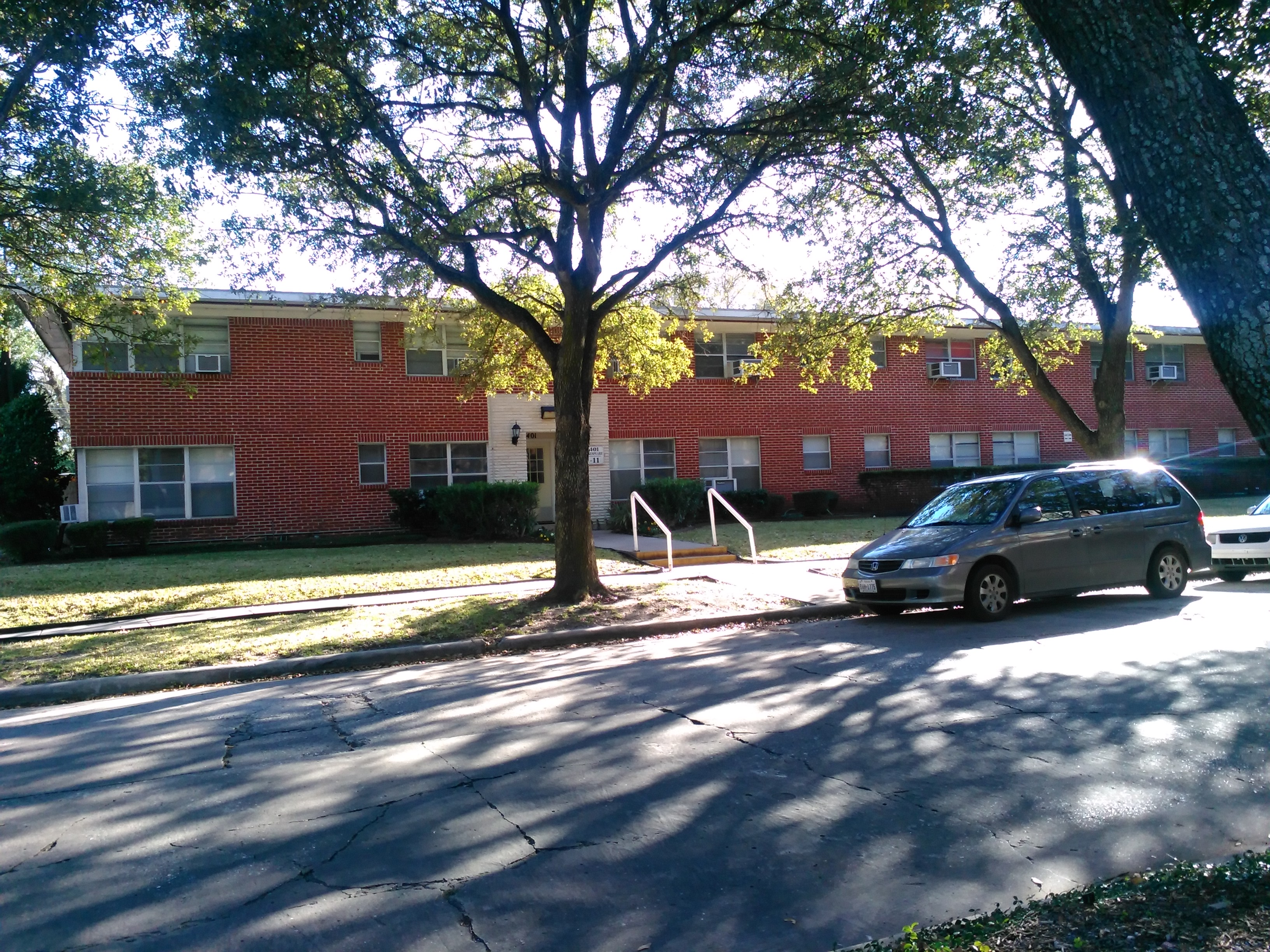
Morningside Square Apartments

| Name | Founding date | Namesake | Ref |
North colleges
| Brown College | 1965 | Margarett Root Brown, wife of Herman Brown | |
| Duncan College | 2009 | Charles Duncan Jr., former Secretary of Energy | |
| Jones College | 1957 | Mary Gibbs Jones, wife of Jesse H. Jones | |
| Martel College | 2002 | Speros Martel, local entrepreneur | |
| McMurtry College | 2009 | Burt and Deedee McMurtry; former was founder of Institutional Venture Partners | |
South colleges
| Baker College | 1957 | Captain James A. Baker | |
| Chao College | 2026 | Ting Tsung Chao, petrochemical executive | |
| Hanszen College | 1957 | Harry Clay Hanszen, oil executive | |
| Lovett College | 1968 | Edgar Odell Lovett, first president of Rice University | |
| Sid Richardson College | 1971 | Sid W. Richardson, Texas oilman | |
| Wiess College | 1957 | Harry Carothers Wiess, founder of Humble Oil | |
| Will Rice College | 1957 | William Marsh Rice, Jr., nephew of William Marsh Rice | |
Graduate housing
| Rice Graduate Apartments | 1999 | | |
| Rice Village Apartments | 2008 | Rice Village | |

=== Athletics ===
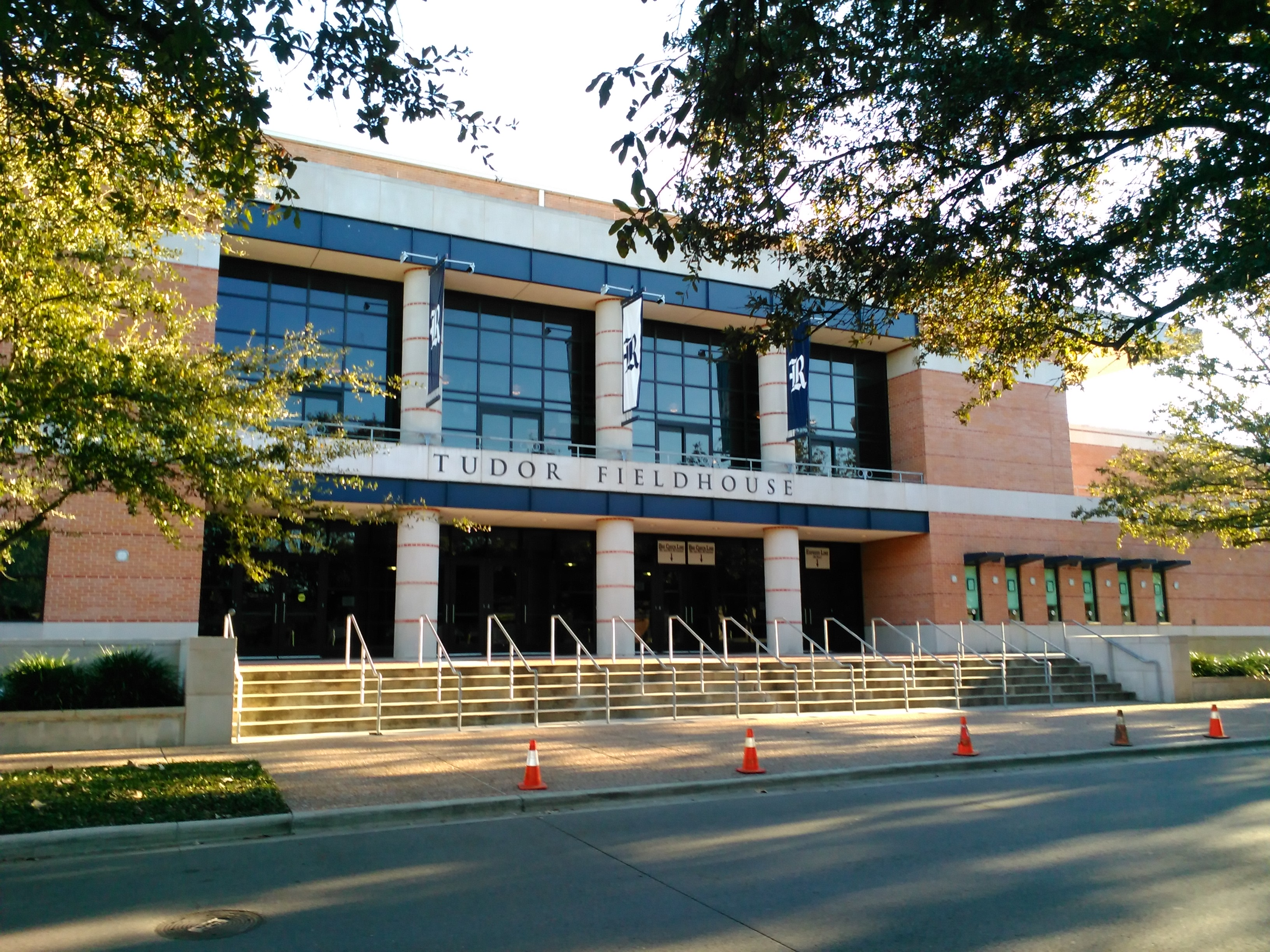
Tudor Fieldhouse

| Name | Date of Construction | Namesake | Contents |
|---|---|---|---|
| Brian Patterson Sports Performance Center | 2017 | Brian Patterson | Rice Owls football training center |
| George R. Brown Tennis Center | 2014 | George R. Brown | 14 tennis courts |
| Barbara and David Gibbs Recreation and Wellness Center | 2009 | Barbara and David Gibbs | Student recreation center |
| John L. Cox Fitness Center | 1995 | John L. Cox, former Professional Golfers' Association of America director | Weight room, fitness and wellness facilities |
| Ley Track and Holloway Field | 1966 | Edward Holloway and Wendel D. Ley | Soccer field; track and field facilities |
| First Community Stadium | 1950 | | Rice Owls football |
| Reckling Park | 2000 | Isla Winston Cowan and Thomas R. Reckling III | Rice Owls baseball |
| Tudor Field House and Younkin Center | 1951 and 2008 | Bobby Tudor, CEO of Tudor, Pickering, Holt & Co. | Basketball and volleyball facilities |

=== Dining and services ===
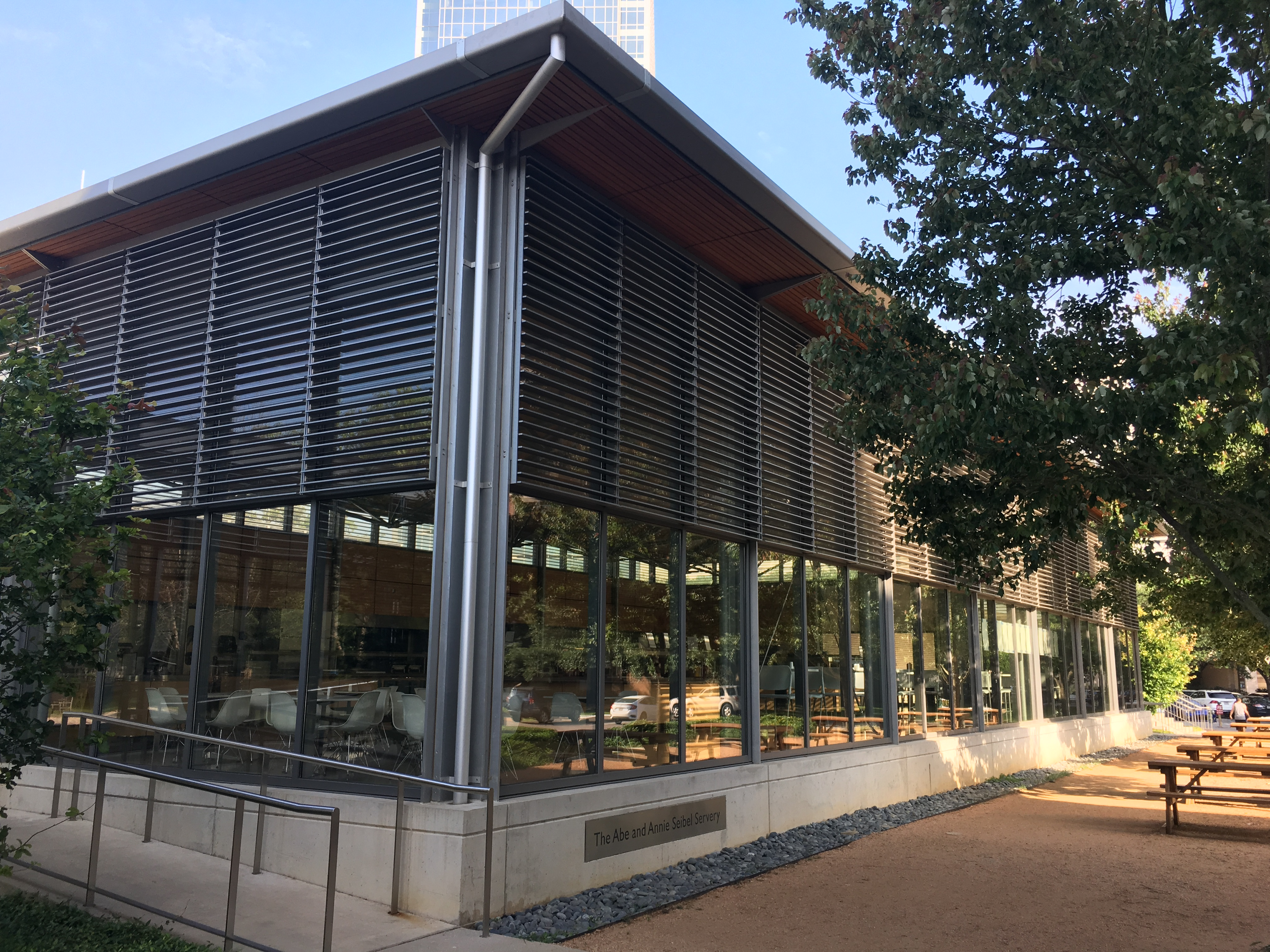
Abe and Annie Seibel Servery, which serves Will Rice and Lovett colleges.

| Name | Date of Construction | Namesake | Contents |
|---|---|---|---|
| South Main Servery | 2026 | | Robot Wok |
| Abe and Annie Seibel Servery | 2010 | Abe and Annie Seibel, philanthropists | |
| Facilities Engineering and Planning | 1964 | | |
| Ley Student Center | 1986 | Wendel and Audrey Moody Ley; former was a land developer | |
| North Servery | 2002 | | |
| Raymond and Susan Brochstein Pavilion | 2009 | Raymond and Susan Brochstein, former was CEO of architecture firm Brochsteins Inc. | Coffee shop |
| Rice Memorial Center | 1958 | | |
| South Plant | 2008 | | |
| South Servery | 2002 | | |
| West Servery | 2009 | | |
