= Sarofim (surname) =

Sarofim is an Egyptian surname. Notable people with the surname include:

- Christopher Sarofim (born 1963), American businessman and fund manager, son of Fayez
- Fayez Sarofim (1929–2022), Egyptian-born American billionaire
