= Sarofim =

Sarofim may refer to:

- Sarofim (surname)
- Sarofim Hall, part of Houston's Hobby Center for the Performing Arts
