= Fayez Sarofim =

Egyptian businessman (1929–2022)

- Born: November 19, 1928; Cairo, Egypt
- Died: May 28, 2022 (aged 93); Houston, Texas, US
- Other name: "The Sphinx"
- Education: University of California, Berkeley; Harvard Business School
- Known for: Founding Fayez Sarofim and Co.
- Spouse(s): Louisa Stude (divorced); Linda Hicks (divorced); Susan Krohn
- Children: 6, including Christopher Sarofim and Phillip Sarofim

Fayez Shalaby Sarofim (Coptic: ϥⲁⲉⲍ ⲥⲉⲣⲁⲫⲓⲙ, Egyptian Arabic: فايز صاروفيم; 19 November 1928 – 28 May 2022) was an Egyptian-American heir to the Sarofim family fortune, a fund manager for three Dreyfus family stock funds, the largest shareholder of Kinder Morgan (NYSE: KMI) and part owner of the NFL team Houston Texans.

Sarofim had an estimated net worth of $1.6 billion in May 2022. His investment firm oversaw over $30 billion in assets.

== Early life ==
Fayez Shalaby Sarofim was born on 19 November 1928 in Cairo to Shalaby and Mary Simaika Sarofim as the second of three children. His family belonged to the old nobility of Egypt. As the son of an Egyptian aristocrat and agricultural magnate, Sarofim spent his early life as a member of Egypt's political and wealthy elite in modern Heliopolis. Holding the title of a Bey (or Chieftain), Sarofim's father also owned large, feudal cotton estates throughout North Africa. Upon his father's death, Sarofim inherited a portion of his fortune.

He attended Victoria College in Alexandria and the English School in Cairo. He emigrated to the United States in 1946, where became a naturalized American citizen in 1961.

After earning degrees from the University of California, Berkeley and the Harvard Business School, Sarofim took a job with cotton company Anderson, Clayton and Company in Houston.

== Career ==
In August 1958, he founded Fayez Sarofim & Company, a Houston investment firm. In 1997, he was inducted into the Texas Business Hall of Fame. Sarofim is ranked third on the most influential Egyptian Americans. The Sarofim family is recorded in Burke's Peerage and the Imperial and Asiatic Quarterly Review and Oriental and Colonial Record'.

== Philanthropy and political donations ==
Sarofim was a contributor to the Houston Ballet and the Museum of Fine Arts, Houston, a favorite of his daughter Allison. He provided support to Memorial Sloan–Kettering Cancer Center, the Texas Children’s Hospital and the University of Texas Health Science Center at Houston for construction of the $120 million Fayez S. Sarofim Research Building. Sarofim also made financial gifts to the Houston Grand Opera, the Houston Symphony, the Hobby Center for the Performing Arts—creating the 2600 seat Sarofim Hall there, designed for touring Broadway musicals— along with the Alley Theatre, and the Los Angeles Opera. A future Susan and Fayez Sarofim Hall is planned for the Rice University campus in Houston.

Sarofim was a major supporter of Jeb Bush's 2016 presidential candidacy.

== Personal life ==
In 1962, Sarofim married Louisa Stude, adopted daughter of Herman Brown, founder of Brown and Root; they had two children: Christopher Sarofim and Allison Sarofim.

In 1984, while still married to Stude, Sarofim secretly had a son, Andrew Sarofim, with Linda Hicks, a former employee at his company. In 1986, they had a second son, Phillip, and in 1989, another son Maxwell was born. In 1990, he divorced his Stude, who received a $250 million divorce settlement.

In 1990, Sarofim married Hicks. In 1996, they divorced, with Hicks receiving a $12 million settlement. Hicks later died while climbing Mount Kilimanjaro. Their son Maxwell died in 2015.

In December 2014, Sarofim married Susan (née DeBarneure) Krohn, founder and owner of Brooke Staffing Companies and owner of New Orleans Auction Galleries. Susan is the ex-wife of fellow billionaire Tracy Krohn, and the mother of Lori Krohn Sarofim, the ex-wife of Sarofim's son Phillip.

Sarofim died on 28 May 2022.
