= Dena Dietrich =

American actress (1928–2020)

- Dietrich in The Practice, 1976
- Born: Deanne Frances Dietrich; December 4, 1928; Pittsburgh, Pennsylvania, U.S.
- Died: November 21, 2020 (aged 91); Los Angeles, California, U.S.
- Occupation: Actress
- Years active: 1967–2007

Deanne Frances Dietrich (December 4, 1928 – November 21, 2020) was an American actress. She was born in Pittsburgh and perhaps best known for her portrayal of Mother Nature in a series of 30-second Chiffon margarine commercials from 1971 to 1979.

== Career ==
On television, Dietrich portrayed Grace Peterson in Adam's Rib, Dena Madison in Karen, Estelle Milner in Paul Sand in Friends and Lovers, Molly Gibbons in The Practice Ethel Armbrewster in The Ropers, and Pearl Newman in 13 East.

Her other television credits include recurring roles on Life with Lucy, Santa Barbara, All My Children and Philly. She made guest appearances on Emergency!, Life Goes On, NYPD Blue, Murphy Brown, and The Golden Girls (as Dorothy's sister Gloria).

Dietrich appeared in such films as The Strange and Deadly Occurrence (1974), The Wild Party (1975), Disney's The North Avenue Irregulars (1979) and the Mel Brooks film History of the World, Part I (1981). She appeared on Broadway in The Rimers of Eldritch, Here's Where I Belong, and The Prisoner of Second Avenue. Outside of film and television, Dietrich provided the voice of the grandmother narrator on the dark ride attraction Horizons at Epcot in Walt Disney World from 1983 until 1999. She studied acting at HB Studio.

=== Mother Nature ===
Dietrich was perhaps best known for her portrayal of Mother Nature in the 30-second Chiffon margarine commercials in the 1970s (1971–79). Dressed in a gown of white and adorned with a crown of daisies, Mother Nature is seen sampling what she believes is butter, straight from nature. An unseen narrator (Mason Adams) informs her "That's Chiffon Margarine, not butter." A perplexed Mother Nature replies that it would be impossible for it to be margarine because it tastes too much like real butter; the narrator responds in delight that the margarine is indeed so close to real butter that it could fool even Mother Nature. Dietrich angrily responds "It's not nice to fool Mother Nature!" and commands nature to attack, such as through thunder and lightning or commanding an elephant to charge the camera. "It's not nice to fool Mother Nature!" eventually became Dietrich's trademark catchphrase. The melodic tagline for the ad reads: "If you think it's butter, but it's not...it's Chiffon."

== Death ==
Dietrich died of natural causes on November 21, 2020, at a health-care facility in Los Angeles, two weeks before turning 92. Upon her death, she was cremated by the Neptune Society and her ashes scattered at sea.
