= Ellen Garwood =

American philanthropist (1903-19930

- Born: Ellen Burdine Clayton Garwood; July 21, 1903; East Orange, New Jersey, U.S.
- Died: March 20, 1993 (aged 89); Austin, Texas, U.S.
- Resting place: Texas State Cemetery
- Occupations: Philanthropist, oral historian, writer
- Known for: Major donor to Nicaraguan Contras
- Notable work: Will Clayton: A Short Biography
- Spouse: Wilmer St. John Garwood
- Children: 2
- Parent(s): William L. Clayton, Susan Vaughn Clayton

Ellen Burdine Clayton Garwood (July 21, 1903 – March 20, 1993) was an American philanthropist, writer, oral historian, and activist whose life and legacy became closely intertwined with major sociopolitical and ideological struggles of the twentieth century. She is best known for her high-profile financial support of the Nicaraguan Contras in the 1980s, which she said was motivated by reports of widespread human rights abuses under the communist Sandinista regime.

== Early life and education ==
Garwood was born in East Orange, New Jersey, as the eldest daughter of William L. Clayton, a cotton merchant and later Undersecretary of State for Economic Affairs known for his work on the Marshall Plan. She grew up in a household where internationalism, public service, and U.S. foreign policy were central themes of discussion.

In 1927, Ellen married Wilmer St. John Garwood, a Texas attorney and Justice of the Texas Supreme Court, and they had two sons.

== Writings and oral history ==
Garwood wrote Will Clayton: A Short Biography in 1958, detailing her father's influence on postwar U.S. diplomacy. She collected and recorded oral histories, including interviews related to the Marshall Plan, now preserved in leading academic libraries.

== Philanthropy and activism ==
Garwood's philanthropic activities included supporting the University of Texas and several cultural institutions, but she came to public notoriety in relation to the Cold War, especially in the context of Nicaragua.

== Financing the Contras and Iran-Contra affair ==
During the 1980s, Nicaragua's Sandinista government, after ousting the authoritarian Somoza regime in the Nicaraguan Revolution, was accused of widespread human rights abuses including arbitrary detention, torture, extrajudicial executions, and the suppression of civil, religious, and press liberties. International organizations documented mass executions (especially among indigenous groups), forced relocations, censorship, and persecution of religious minorities.

Garwood was moved by reports of these abuses and, spurred by personal communications and appeals for urgent support, decided to finance the Nicaraguan Contras, a coalition of insurgents, exiles, and indigenous activists resisting the Sandinista regime.

Garwood donated $2.5 million – the majority of funds raised by organizations such as the National Endowment for the Preservation of Liberty. She explained her commitment during congressional hearings, especially those of the Iran–Contra affair, stating that her support was driven by the documented repression and lack of democratic liberties in Nicaragua.

President Ronald Reagan personally thanked Garwood for her support because she privately financed the Contras when his Administration was legally restrained from doing so by legislation that was informally called the Boland Amendment. Her advocacy and fundraising efforts included arranging for equipment—such as the “Lady Ellen” helicopter—and rallying other private donors.

== Political legacy and controversy ==
Garwood's activism placed her at the center of the controversial Iran-Contra affair. Conservative supporters of Contra aid viewed such assistance as supporting freedom fighters against communist expansion in Central America, while critics—including many members of Congress—argued that circumventing the Boland Amendment and funding the Contras contributed to violence and prolonged civil strife in Nicaragua.

== Later years and death ==
Garwood died on March 20, 1993, in Austin, Texas, and is buried in the Texas State Cemetery.
