= William L. Clayton =

American businessman and government official (1880–1966)

William Clayton
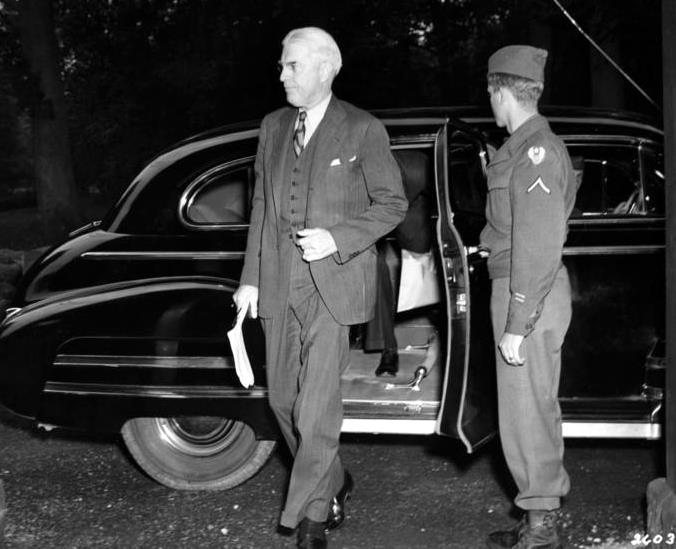
- Clayton arrives for the Potsdam Conference, 1945

Under Secretary of State for Economic Affairs
- In office August 3, 1946 – October 15, 1947
- President: Franklin D. Roosevelt
- Preceded by: Position established
- Succeeded by: C. Douglas Dillon

Assistant Secretary of State for Economic Affairs
- In office December 8, 1944 – August 3, 1946
- President: Franklin D. Roosevelt
- Preceded by: Position established
- Succeeded by: Willard Thorp

Personal details
- Born: William Lockhart Clayton; February 7, 1880 Tupelo, Mississippi, U.S.
- Died: February 8, 1966 (aged 86) Houston, Texas, U.S.
- Party: Democratic
- Spouse: Susan Vaughan
- Children: Ellen

William Lockhart Clayton (February 7, 1880 – February 8, 1966) was an American business leader and government official. Much of his business career centered on cotton trading, he formed and grew (with his brother, his brother-in-law, and the brother of his brother-in-law) a partnership that became Anderson, Clayton and Company—at one time the world's largest cotton trading company. Politically aligned with the Democratic Party, he initially opposed some of President Franklin D. Roosevelt's agricultural policies, but later reversed that opposition after Roosevelt's Secretary of State Cordell Hull worked for reciprocal free trade agreements. (Note: Clayton had previously strongly supported such a policy for years as a private citizen.)

Clayton held minor board roles in government during World War I. Returning to government service in 1940, during World War II, he took on a number of roles in the Roosevelt and Truman administrations. He first served as deputy to the coordinator of inter-American affairs. For the next four years he held a variety of high-level positions with the Export-Import Bank, the Department of Commerce, and wartime agencies. He served as assistant, and then as deputy Secretary of State for economic affairs from December 1944 to October 1947, where he was primarily concerned with working on the Marshall Plan. He returned to Houston and private life in late 1947, though he continued to serve the government as a participant and contributor to various international conferences on world trade and other economic issues.

== Early life and career ==
He was born near Tupelo, Mississippi, to James Monroe and Martha Fletcher (Burdine).

Clayton moved with his family in 1886, to Jackson, Tennessee, where he completed seven grades of public school. Leaving school at age 13, he became an expert stenographer, which earned him a job as private secretary to Jerome Hall, a St. Louis cotton merchant. In 1896, Clayton went to work for the American Cotton Company in New York City, becoming an assistant general manager in 1904. He left the company later that year to join with two other partners (including his brother-in-law Monroe Dunaway Anderson) in starting Anderson, Clayton and Company, a cotton marketing firm based in Oklahoma City. In 1916, the firm moved its headquarters to Houston, Texas, where it grew to be the world's largest cotton-trading enterprise.

== Government service ==
Clayton entered government service in World War I as a member of the Cotton Distribution Committee of the War Industries Board. Although he was a Democrat, he opposed the New Deal agricultural policies of Democratic President Franklin D. Roosevelt, but the New Deal's free trade policies led him to support Roosevelt in the 1936 election.

In 1940, Clayton returned to government service in the Reconstruction Finance Corporation, then moved to the Export-Import Bank, where he worked to procure strategic materials for the United States and to deny them to Nazi Germany. After a series of administrative shuffles, Clayton found himself working under Vice President Henry A. Wallace. Disagreements between them led Clayton to resign in January 1944, only to return to government service a month later as Surplus War Property Administrator under James F. Byrnes in the Office of War Mobilization.

At the end of 1944, Clayton was named the first Assistant Secretary of State for Economic Affairs, a post that allowed him to promote the free trade policies that he believed in. He was a member of the Interim Committee appointed to advise Secretary of War Henry L. Stimson and President Harry S. Truman on problems expected to arise from the development of the atomic bomb. He was an economic advisor to Truman at the 1945 Potsdam Conference, which helped flesh out plans for the post-WW2 world order and the reconstruction of a war-decimated Europe.

=== Postwar career ===
External image
- http://webapps.jhu.edu/namedprofessorships/images/Med43.jpg William L. Clayton and Susan Vaughan Clayton. Source: Johns Hopkins University.

Truman appointed Clayton as the first Under Secretary of State for Economic Affairs, a post Clayton held for 1946-47. In this role, Clayton witnessed the weakness of U.S. allies and their susceptibility to falling under the domination of the Soviet Union. He urged greater U.S. engagement with the world to halt the spread of communism. In a March 5 memo, Clayton wrote a fifteen-point manifesto for U.S. global leadership, in which he argued:

The reins of world leadership are fast slipping from Britain's competent, but now very weak hands. These reins will be picked up either by the United States or by Russia. If by Russia, there will almost certainly be a war in the next decade or so, with the odds against us. If by the United States, war can almost certainly be prevented.

Clayton strongly supported American economic aid to rebuild Europe after World War II and had a major role in shaping the Marshall Plan in 1947. After returning from a meeting at the United Nations Economic Commission for Europe in Geneva in May, Clayton wrote a memo to George Marshall, "The European Crisis," in which he argued that U.S. economic aid was urgently needed to prevent the collapse of Europe. In the memo, he warned that "without further prompt and substantial aid from the United States, economic, social and political disintegration will overwhelm Europe Charles Bohlen, when drafting the announcement of the Marshall Plan, drew heavily from Clayton's memo.

Clayton also advised Truman on the U.S. response to the creation of the state of Israel. On September 12, 1946, during the lead-up to the United Nations Special Committee on Palestine (UNSCOP) recommending the partition of Palestine, Clayton prepared a memo that advised Truman against issuing a statement of support for a Jewish state for the time being. He cautioned that such a move would contradict the recommendations of the Anglo-American Committee and the Morrison–Grady Plan, potentially inciting hostility from the Arab world. Truman's September 14 reply expressed his hope that a public statement would not be necessary, and he would clear any statements with Clayton before speaking on the matter.

In 1948, he returned to his private business in Houston but remained active in efforts to promote free trade and economic cooperation between the United States and its allies during the Cold War. Clayton was also an early advocate of improved relations between the United States and the People's Republic of China,

In 1963, when Clayton was in his eighties, President John F. Kennedy asked him to work on the national export expansion program and the limited nuclear test ban treaty. The William L. Clayton Professorship of International Economics at the Paul H. Nitze School of Advanced International Studies, a part of the Johns Hopkins University (of which Clayton was a trustee from 1949 until his death), is named for him.

== Personal and family life ==
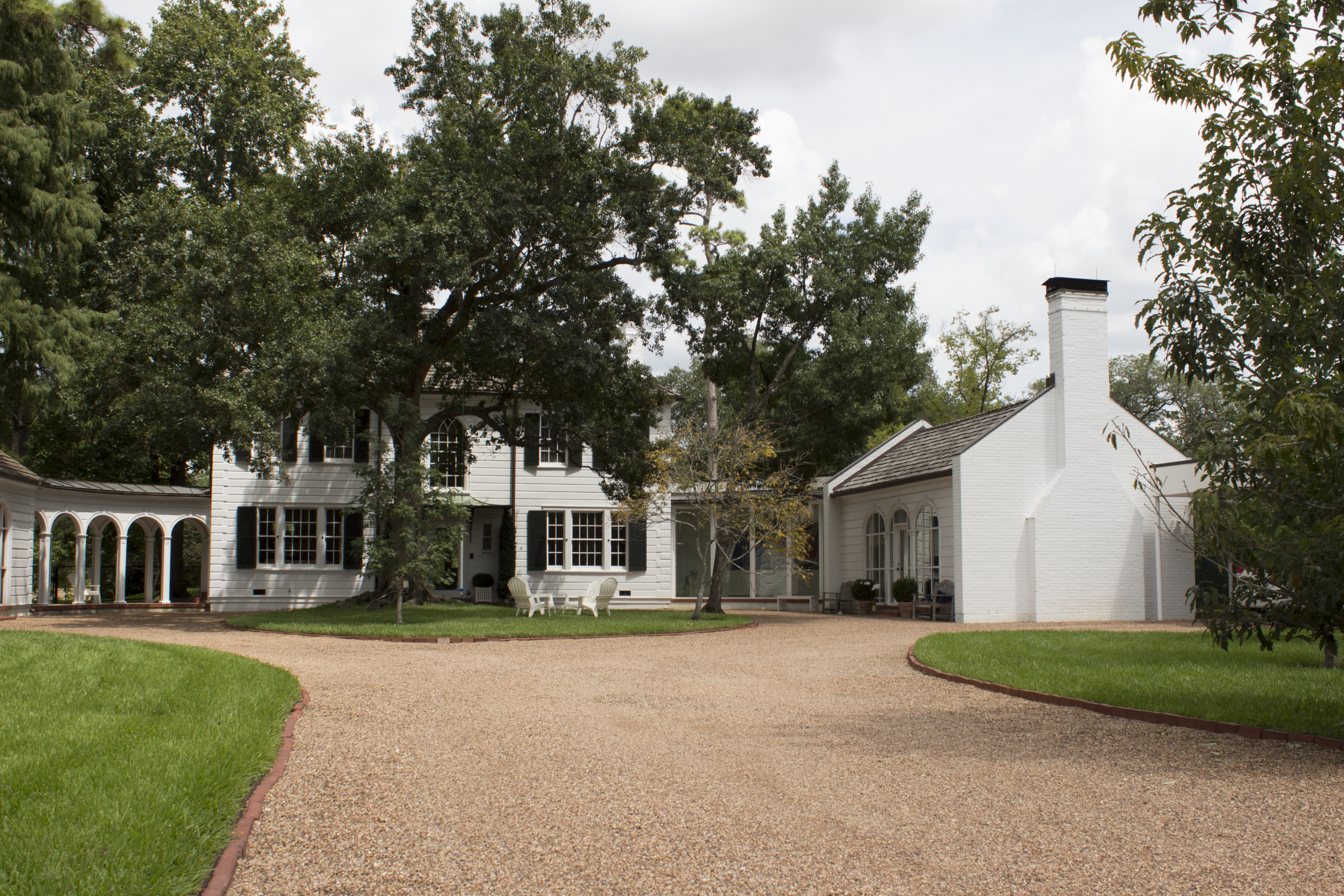
Clayton's summer house in Houston, Texas, designed and built for him in 1924

Clayton married Susan Vaughan Clayton in Clinton, Kentucky on August 14, 1902. They had one son and four daughters. The son died in infancy, but the daughters survived their parents.

William Clayton died in Houston, Texas February 8, 1966, after a short illness, and is buried there in Glenwood Cemetery.

== Clayton papers ==
Many of Clayton's papers (1926-1966) are housed at the Harry S. Truman Presidential Library and Museum in Independence, Missouri. Other significant papers are housed at Rice University and the Hoover Institution.

== Memorials ==
Clayton is memorialized by the William L. Clayton Professorship on International Economics at the Paul H. Nitze School of Advanced International Studies, a part of Johns Hopkins University located in Washington, D.C., (Note: James C.Riedel is the current holder of the William L. Clayton Professorship in International Economics at Johns Hopkins.) The William L. Clayton Professorship of International Economic Affairs at The Fletcher School of Law and Diplomacy, a part of Tufts University, and the Will Clayton Fellowship in International Economics at the James Baker Institute, a part of Rice University. Clayton and his associates in the cotton trade are memorialized on a marker in the M.D. Anderson Memorial Plaza in Jackson, Tennessee. Clayton Library Center for Genealogical Research, a division of the Houston Public Library, located in the Clayton home, guest house, carriage house, and additional building is considered one of the foremost genealogical libraries in the United States.

== Notes ==
Government offices
New office	Assistant Secretary of State for Economic Affairs; 1944–1946	Succeeded by Willard Thorp
New office	Under Secretary of State for Economic Affairs; 1946–1947	Succeeded by C. Douglas Dillon
