= Lynn R. Lowrey Arboretum =

Arboretum on the campus of Rice University in Houston, Texas, United States

Coordinates: 29°43′07″N 95°23′56″W

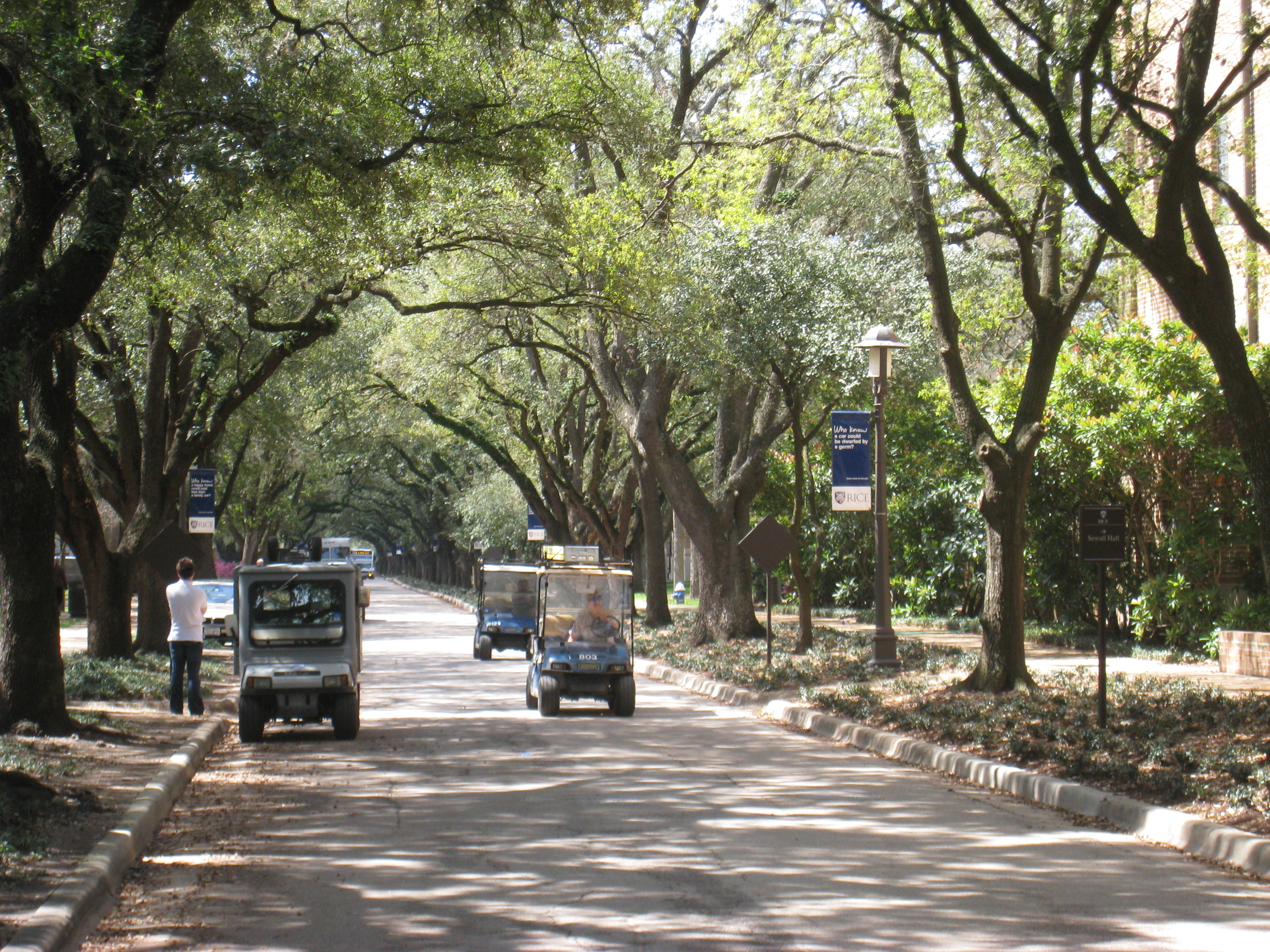
- Interactive map of Lynn R. Lowrey Arboretum
- Type: Arboretum
- Location: Houston, Texas
- Owner: Rice University
- Open: Open daily.
- Website: arboretum.rice.edu

The Lynn R. Lowrey Arboretum is an arboretum located throughout the campus of Rice University in Houston, Texas, United States and is open daily without charge.

The arboretum was dedicated in 1999 to honor horticulturist Lynn R. Lowrey. At that time five trees were planted just inside Gate 6 of the campus: two white oaks, two fringe trees, and a swamp chestnut oak.

The arboretum contains about 4,200 trees and shrubs across the campus, representing 88 species of woody plants in total, with about 100 collected botanical specimens. In addition to native plants of Texas and northeast Mexico, the collection focuses on other major woody plant genera of eastern North America (specifically oaks, elms, ashes, hickories, maples and pines) or plants of particular horticultural interest in the region.

Of particular interest was the Pershing Tree, a pecan tree planted in 1920 by General John Pershing, commander of the American Expeditionary Force in World War I. The tree has since been struck by lightning. Beyond repair, it was removed. In 2016 Colin Powell planted a pecan tree on campus in Pershing's memory.

Because of the management of its trees in the arboretum, Rice earned the status as a "Tree Campus USA" from the Arbor Day Foundation four times since 2012.

== See also ==
- List of botanical gardens in the United States
