= Christopher Sarofim =

American businessman and fund manager (born 1963)

- Born: Christopher Binyon Sarofim; 1963 (age 62–63)
- Education: Princeton University
- Occupation: Fund manager
- Title: Deputy chairman, Fayez Sarofim & Co.
- Spouses: Valerie Biggs (div. 2000): Courtney Lanier
- Children: 3
- Parent(s): Fayez Sarofim; Louisa Stude
- Relatives: Bob Lanier (father-in-law); Phillip Sarofim (brother)

Christopher Binyon Sarofim (born 1963) is an American businessman and fund manager.

He is the chairman of Fayez Sarofim & Co, president of Sarofim International Management Company, and a director of the Sarofim Group. On 23 April 2025 it was announced that he had joined the ownership group of Everton Football Club.

== Early life ==
Christopher Sarofim is the eldest son of Fayez Sarofim and his first wife, Louisa Stude Sarofim. She is the daughter of Margaret and Herman Brown, the co-founder of Brown & Root.

Sarofim graduated from St. George's School in 1982, where he was on the board for nine years. Sarofim received a bachelor's degree in history from Princeton University in 1986.

== Career ==
After graduating from Princeton, Sarofim worked in corporate finance for Goldman Sachs, and then joined Fayez Sarofim & Co. At Fayez Sarofim & Co., he worked as an associate (August 1988 – June 1993), then a Senior Associate (June 1993 – October 1994), a principal (October 1994 – September 1999), and vice president (September 1999 – September 2010).

Since 2010, he has been portfolio manager, vice chairman, and director of the company. He is a member of the firm's executive, finance, and investment committees, and president of their foreign advisory business, Sarofim International Management Company. He is on the board of directors of Wood Partners, a privately held real estate development company, and Kemper Corporation, a publicly traded insurance company.

Sarofim is a member of the board of trustees of The Brown Foundation, Inc and was on the board of the Texas Heart Institute. He is also on the Advisory Committee of the MD Anderson Cancer Center Board of Visitors, and is on the UTHealth development board. He is the deputy chairman of Fayez Sarofim & Co. He is the designated successor of Fayez Sarofim.

Sarofim was on the board of directors of the Georgia O'Keeffe museum.

He and his wife, Courtney, were 2017 Community Champions, supporting Texas Children's Cancer Center's annual Celebration of Champions. They also support The Texan French Alliance for the Arts, and are both donors to the Houston Cinema Arts Society, and other organizations.

In May 2019, the Sarofims invested in New York based designer Adam Lippes. In August 2020, Sarofim was appointed to the Baylor College of Medicine Board of Trustees.

== Personal life ==
He was married to Valerie Biggs, and they divorced in 2000. They had a daughter together, who was later the subject of a custody battle.

Sarofim is now married to Courtney Lanier, stepdaughter of Elyse and Bob Lanier, former mayor of Houston. Since 2010, she has been a partner at Sima Capital LLC, an alternative investments firm. They have two children.
