= Monroe Dunaway Anderson =

American banker

- Born: 29 June 1873; Jackson, Tennessee
- Died: 6 August 1939 (aged 66); Houston, Texas
- Other name: M. D. Anderson
- Occupations: Banker, cotton trader, business executive, philanthropist
- Known for: Founder of Anderson, Clayton and Company; Philanthropy
- Notable work: Texas Medical Center

Monroe Dunaway Anderson (1873–1939) was a banker and cotton trader from Jackson, Tennessee. With William L. Clayton, Anderson built Anderson, Clayton and Company (formed in 1904 by his brother Frank E. Anderson and Frank's brother-in-law, William L. Clayton) into the world's biggest cotton company. In the event of one of their deaths, the partnership would lose a large amount of money to estate taxes and might be forced to dissolve. In order to avoid this, Anderson created the M.D. Anderson Foundation with an initial sum of $300,000 (equivalent to $6,960,000 in 2025). In 1939, after Anderson's death the foundation received an additional $19 million (equivalent to $440 million in 2025).

In 1941, the Texas Legislature appropriated $500,000 to build a cancer hospital and research center. The M.D. Anderson Foundation agreed to match the state funds if the hospital were located in Houston at the Texas Medical Center (another project of the Anderson Foundation), and named after Anderson.

Using surplus World War II Army barracks, the hospital operated for 10 years from a converted residence and 46 beds leased in a Houston hospital before moving to its current location in 1954. The center would later become one of the leading cancer research and treatment institutions in the world.

== Early life ==
Monroe Dunaway Anderson was born on June 29, 1873, the sixth of eight children born to James W. Anderson and his wife Ellen (née Dunaway) in Jackson, Tennessee. Private J.W. Anderson had enlisted in the Confederate States Army, but had been captured in March 1864 as he returned home to visit his young family in McNairy County (south of Jackson, on the Mississippi border), then was held at Camp Chase near Columbus, Ohio, in part because his uncle James M. Anderson of Glasgow, Kentucky traveled to Washington, D.C. to secure his release. After the war, the elder Anderson founded the First National Bank of Jackson. Although his formal schooling stopped after the eighth grade, "M.D." (as the boy was often called) worked for his father at the bank, where learned about finance and prepared for his later business success. Monroe's older brother, Frank, had already tried working in the bank, but found the routine too boring. Blessed with charisma and a magnetic personality, Frank had already decided he wanted to go into cotton trading. About the same time, he met Burdine Clayton, who had just moved to Jackson from Tupelo, Mississippi, with her family: father Thomas Munroe Clayton, mother Martha Fletcher (née Burdine) and brothers, William (Will) and Benjamin (Ben). Not only did Frank and Burdine fall in love and marry, but Will and Frank became best friends. The two shared the vision of starting a company that would buy, process and sell cotton worldwide.

== Starting Anderson, Clayton and Company ==
Monroe, Frank and their brother-in-law, Will, scraped up $9,000 and went to Oklahoma City. On August 1, 1904, they launched their business, Anderson, Clayton and Company, during the era of the Jim Crow economy. Ben Clayton was still working in New York for the American Cotton Company. Will had also worked at the same company, and between them, they had learned about international banking and establishing shipping networks (both by rail and by sea). Ben soon moved south to join them.

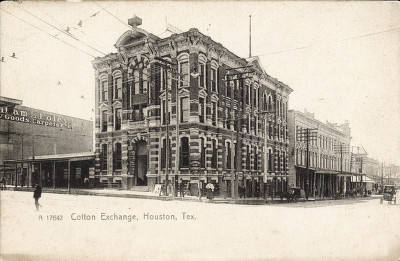
Cotton Exchange Building, Houston, Texas (1910)

In 1900, a powerful hurricane had essentially wiped out Galveston, Texas, which had been the country's leading cotton port. Entrepreneurs in Houston had stepped up to fill the vacuum. The Anderson, Clayton partners decided that Monroe should go to Houston and study the opportunities for their firm. He agreed to go in 1907 and moved into a downtown hotel on Main Street. He soon rented office space for Anderson, Clayton in the Cotton Exchange Building. (Note: The Cotton Exchange Building was constructed in 1884 at 202 Travis Street, and was still standing in 2014. Known for his frugality, Monroe could walk to work each morning, carrying a sack lunch.)

Monroe spent the rest of his life in Houston. With the completion of the Houston Ship Channel in 1915 and the onset of World War I in 1916, the demand for (and price of) cotton was booming. It was obvious that Anderson, Clayton and Company should be at the center of this action. Its entire headquarters were moved from Oklahoma City to Houston by 1916.

== Health problems and death ==
In the summer of 1938, while Monroe was eating lunch at the Majestic Grill with some of his business associates, one of his arms went numb. He was rushed back to his hotel room, where his physician gave him a sedative and sent some nurses to monitor his condition until he could be moved to Baptist Memorial Hospital. The doctor diagnosed the problem as a stroke. He remained in the hospital for a month, while he bought a house on Sunset Boulevard (near the Texas Medical Center site). Serving as a place for him to convalesce, it was the only private house he ever owned. During this time, doctors discovered that he had been having recurrent kidney problems. On August 6, 1939, Monroe Dunaway Anderson, age 66, died at his home. His family and close friends decided he should be buried in the family plot at Riverside Cemetery in Jackson, Tennessee.

== Honors and memorials ==
- Congressman Stephen Fincher, introduced a bill (HR1264) in the U.S. House of Representatives on March 23, 2011, to name a square in Jackson, Tennessee as the M.D. Anderson Plaza. The bill passed both the House and Senate, and was signed by President Obama on January 3, 2012. The square is between the United States Federal Courthouse and the Ed Jones Building, located at 109 South Highland Avenue in Jackson.
- The Association for Preservation of Tennessee Antiquities and the West Tennessee Healthcare Foundation joined forces to honor Monroe Dunaway Anderson's boyhood home at 111 East Orleans in Jackson, Tennessee. A commemoration ceremony was held there on October 5, 2013.

== See also ==
- Anderson, Clayton and Company
- Texas Medical Center
- MD Anderson Cancer Center
- M.D. Anderson Library
