= Anderson, Clayton and Company =

Cotton trading firm in Houston

Anderson, Clayton and Company (sometimes written Anderson, Clayton and Co, or ACC) was a cotton trading firm started in Oklahoma City by Frank Anderson, his brother Monroe Anderson, and brother-in-law William Clayton. These three men formed a partnership on August 1, 1904. The company moved to Houston early in the 20th century because that city was gaining on Galveston for the title of cotton capital of the U.S. after the near-complete destruction of that port by the 1900 Galveston hurricane, and on account of Houston's rapidly expanding shipping facilities. By 1944, the company had become the world's largest cotton-trading company.

In 1986, the company was acquired by the Quaker Oats Company that led to its delisting from the stock exchange and the closing of its Houston offices.

== History ==
The company was created as a partnership on August 1, 1904, by Monroe Dunaway (M. D.) Anderson, his brother Frank E. Anderson and Frank's brother-in-law William L. Clayton. In 1916, the company moved to Houston, Texas in order to have better access to a shipping port. In 1905, William's younger brother, Benjamin Clayton, already known as an expert in railroad and steamship transportation, joined the partnership.

The company grew over the next four decades, including during World War I, where it helped meet high demand for the commodity. In August 1923, the senior Bolshevik Viktor Nogin, head of the Soviet Textile Trust, traveled to New York and negotiated a deal with Anderson, Clayton and Company to provide cotton to the newly established Soviet Union. This the first trade deal between a US company and the communist regime.

By 1944 the company had grown to be the largest provider of cotton in the world, and had cotton oil mills and cotton gins in several countries. The company went public in 1945, and continued to expand by financing cotton growers in several states.

Monroe Anderson died in 1939, leaving a legacy which was used to fund the M.D. Anderson Foundation which, in turn, funded the University of Texas MD Anderson Cancer Center by matching funding from the state of Texas. The Anderson Foundation trustees insisted that the new school be set up in Houston near the company headquarters. The new Cancer Center originally operated out of World War II barracks; it later grew to become a substantial part of the Texas Medical Center.

As the company grew it diversified into foods and international markets, including the brands Chiffon margarine, Gaines Pet Foods and Seven Seas salad dressing. Anderson, Clayton also acquired major interests in food companies in Brazil and Mexico, but their profits were hurt by currency devaluations in those countries.

Although the food acquisitions turned out to be quite profitable, some other acquisitions were decidedly not. The Ranger Insurance Company had lost money for several years, culminating in a loss of $58.8 million in fiscal year 1985 alone. Although Anderson, Clayton had tried to sell Ranger, there were no bidders, and the parent corporation experienced its worst financial performance in many years.

By 1986, stock analysts were already discussing rumors of hostile takeovers. Anderson, Clayton began selling off some valuable holdings to raise more cash, so it could raise cash reserves in case of a fight. American Founders Life Insurance Company, was the first to go, bringing in $58.7 million. A warehouse and trucking company sold for $22 million. The Brazilian and Mexican food operations were sold to Unilever, N.V., for $109.1 million.

On September 29, 1986, Reuters released news that Anderson, Clayton had announced that it would be acquired by the Quaker Oats Company in a merger estimated to be worth $812 million. The deal had been contested by Ralston Purina, which had planned to match the Quaker Oats offer, provided there were no antitrust objections from the Justice Department. All three companies were major competitors in the American pet food market. Anderson Clayton made and marketed the Gaines brand. Ralston Purina was already the market leader, and a merger with Anderson Clayton would have pushed its share of the pet food market to 35 percent. Quaker Oats, marketing the Ken-L Ration brand had only 8 percent of the market before the merger and would have a 15 percent share after the merger. The Justice Department had already given preliminary approval to the Quaker Oats offer.

Quaker only kept Gaines Pet Food and sold the rest of the company. Kraft Foods acquired the foods division in 1987.

== Additional Sources ==
- Kellar, William Henry (2014). Enduring legacy : the M.D. Anderson Foundation and the Texas Medical Center (First ed.). Texas A&M University Press. ISBN 978-1-62349-131-4.

== See also ==
- Monroe Dunaway Anderson
