= Jacqueline Couti =

Professor

- Born: Martinique
- Occupation: Professor

Academic background
- Education: University of Virginia (MA, PhD)

Academic work
- Discipline: Francophone Studies

Jacqueline Couti is the Laurence H. Favrot Professor of French Studies and chair of the Department of Modern and Classical Languages, Literatures, and Cultures at Rice University. There, she formerly served as Associate Director of the Center for the Study of Women, Gender, and Sexuality and was a founding faculty member of the Center for African and African American Studies.

== Education ==
Dr. Couti received her MA in 2004 and her PhD in 2008 from the University of Virginia in French Language and Literatures with a specialization in Francophone and New World Studies.

== Career ==
Dr. Couti came to Rice University's Department of Classical and European Studies, which is now the Department of Modern and Classical Languages, Literatures and Cultures, in 2018. In 2019, Dr. Couti organized a three-day international symposium on black feminism entitled Can We Talk About Black Feminisms in a French (Post-)imperial Context?. In the spring of 2020, Dr. Couti was awarded a Conference and Workshop Development Fund grant for In the Path of Disaster(s) with Luis Duno-Gottberg, as well as a Scholarly and Creative Works Subvention Fund grant for Sex, Sea, and Self: Nationalism and Sexuality in French Caribbean Discourses, 1924-1948. In early March 2020, she co-organized, with Jennifer A. Boittin (Penn State), Lucia Direnberger (CNRS-CMH), Silyane Larcher (CNRS-IRIS), Rose Ndengue (CEDREF – Université Paris 7 Diderot) and Myriam Paris (CESSP – Université Paris 1 Panthéon Sorbonne), the conference Des féminismes noirs en contexte (post)impérial français? Histoires, expériences et théories in Paris-Aubervilliers, helping to open new avenues for the study of French and Francophone Black feminist thought, histories, and experiences.. In August 2023, she co-edited—alongside Jennifer Boittin (Penn State)—the special issue Standing Up & Determined: Black Women on the Move, Black Feminisms in French (Post)Imperial Contexts for the Journal of Women's History. This bilingual issue, available in French and English, is accessible via jwomenshistory.org. In October 2024, she co-organized the international conference Global Black French Studies across Time and Space: The Formation and Future of the Field, in collaboration with Jennifer A. Boittin, Audrey Célestine, Rachel Jean-Baptiste, Trica Keaton, Lorelly Semley, and others. In February 2025, her leadership helped secure Creative Ventures and HRC funding for the symposium Haiti and the World: Global Encounters of the Past, Present, and Future, which she co-organized with Dr. Linsey Sainte-Claire. In April 2025, she received a Creative Ventures Award for the symposium The World at Play: The Beautiful Game in 2026, held February 6-7, 2026, co-organized with Dr. Caroline Fache in advance of the 2026 FIFA World Cup in Houston.

Dr. Couti joined the Department of Modern and Classical Languages, Literatures, and Cultures at the University of Kentucky in 2010 as an associate professor of French and Francophone Studies. While there, she also taught in Gender and Women Studies as well as African-American and Africana Studies, and served as an advisor for the Caribbean Student Association. Dr. Couti, who is a native of Martinique, was the first scholar given access to Aimé Césaire's home office documents when she conducted a research trip in 2010 in preparation for a critical edition on the Martinican politician and poet.

== Awards ==
- 2013-2014 College of Arts & Sciences Outstanding Teaching Award, University of Kentucky
- 2016 College of Arts and Sciences Outstanding Teaching Awards: Award for Diversity and Inclusion, University of Kentucky
- 2024 Chevalier de l'Ordre des Palmes Académiques, French Ministry of National Education
- 2025 Provost's Award for Outstanding Faculty Achievement, Rice University

== Bibliography ==
- Dangerous Creole Liaisons: Sexuality and Nationalism in French Caribbean Discourses from 1806 to 1897 (Liverpool University Press, 2016). Paperback 2021. French translation 2022.
- Ed. and introd., Maïotte by Jenny Manet (1896) (Paris: L’Harmattan, 2014).
- Ed. and introd., "Les amours de Zémédare" et "Carina" by Auguste Traversay de Sansac (1806) (Paris: L’Harmattan, 2017).
- ed. Afroféminisme (Essays in French Literature and Culture, 2019)
- Ed. with Kathleen Gyssels, “Mines de rien”: L’Antillaise et l’Afropéenne face aux tropologies, entre mythes et réalités au fil du temps, special issue of Essays in French Literature and Culture 56 (October 2019).
- Sex, Sea, and Self: Sexuality and Nationalism in French Caribbean Discourses 1924-1948 (Liverpool University Press, 2021).
- Ed. with Anny Curtius, Women, Theory, Praxis, and Performativities: Transoceanic Entanglements in Francophone Settings (Liverpool University Press, 2025).
