= James R. Lawler =

Australian-French academic (1929–2013)

James Lawler FAHA
- Born: James Ronald Lawler; 15 August 1929; Melbourne, Australia
- Died: 28 July 2013 (aged 83); Paris, France
- Occupation: Academic
- Writing career
- Notable works: Lecture de Valéry: une étude de Charmes; The Language of French Symbolism; Rene Char: The Myth and the Poem; Rimbaud’s Theatre of the Self; Poetry and Moral Dialectic: Baudelaire’s ‘Secret Architecture’

James Ronald Lawler FAHA (1929–2013) was the foundation professor of French studies at the University of Western Australia (1963–1971) and later the Edward Carson Waller Distinguished Service Professor in Romance Languages and Literatures at the University of Chicago.

== Early life and education ==
James Lawler was born on 15 August 1929 in Melbourne.

He studied French at the University of Melbourne in the period that Professor A. R. Chisholm was the head of the Department of French. In 1950 he graduated with a Bachelor of Arts with first class honours in English and French and in 1952 graduated with an M.A. with first class honours in French.

He undertook research for a doctorate at the Sorbonne in Paris, France, which he successfully completed in 1954 with a "mention très honorable" for his thesis, Style et Poétique chez Guillaume Apollinaire.

== Academic career ==
In 1963, after two years as lecturer in French at the University of Queensland and six years as a senior lecturer in the Department of French under Professor Ronald Jackson at the University of Melbourne, Lawler became, at the age of just 33, the foundation Professor of French Studies at the University of Western Australia. He proceeded to restructure the French department, introducing new courses in French civilisation and history to accompany the traditional offerings in French language and literature.

During his tenure at UWA he founded Essays in French Literature, a "top ranking" academic journal that still exists and is now known as Essays in French Literature and Culture.

Lawler left Australia for North America in 1971 where he was appointed to a succession of chairs of French: at the University of California, Los Angeles, then at Dalhousie University, in Nova Scotia (1974–79), and finally at the University of Chicago (1979–97) where he became the Edward Carson Waller Distinguished Service Professor in Romance Languages and Literatures. While at Dalhousie University he founded the journal Dalhousie French Studies. While at Chicago, he was also a visiting professor at the Collège de France and an invited professor in Tokyo (teaching classes in the Master of Arts Program in the Humanities in Japan).

Lawler was a foundation fellow of the Australian Academy of the Humanities.

== Later life ==
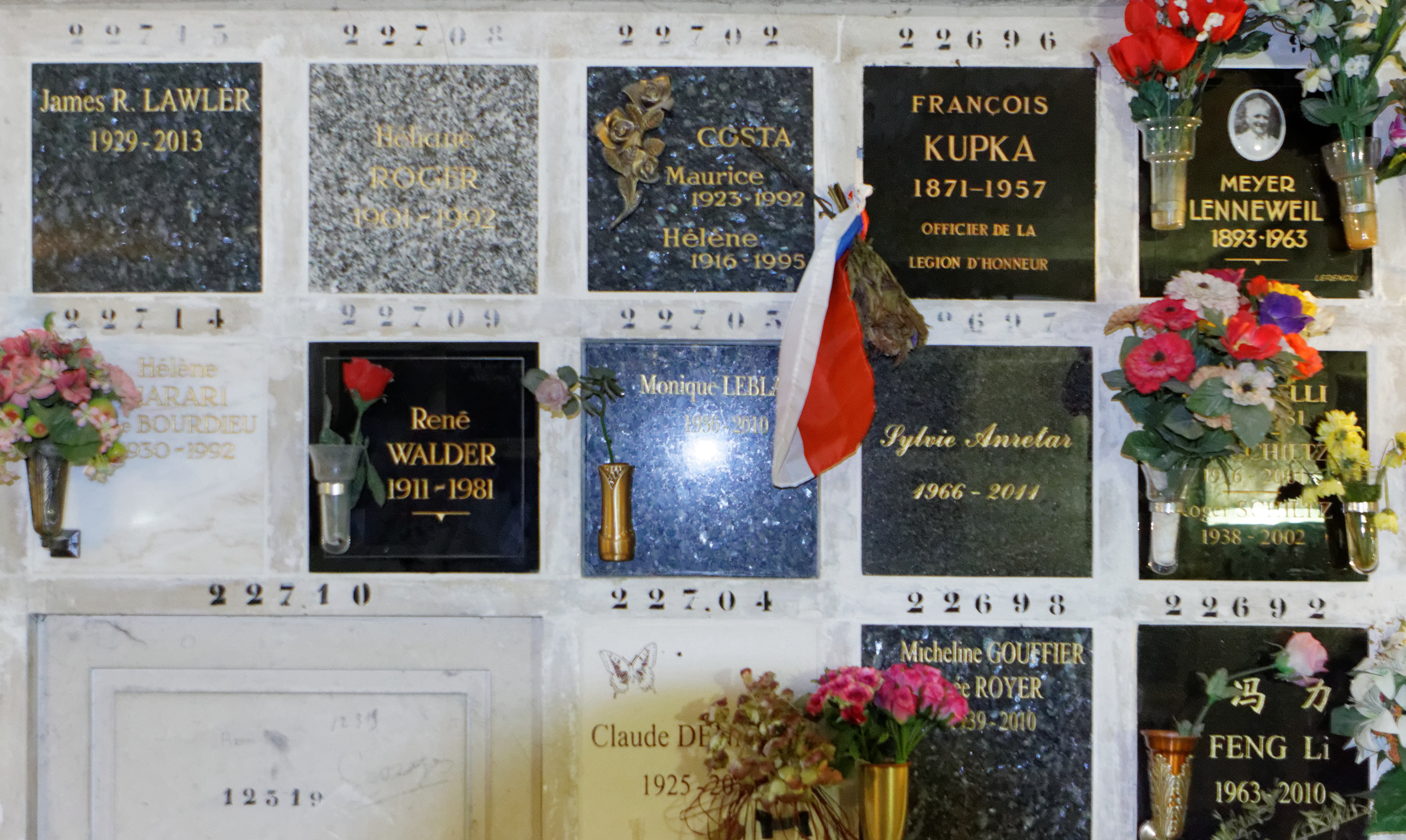
Lawler's burial niche at Père-Lachaise Cemetery in Paris, France

In 1997 Lawler retired and moved to Paris with his wife. He remained active in his literary life and studies and served as the president of both the Association Internationale des Etudes Françaises and of the Association des Amis de Rimbaud.

== Legacy ==
According to Wallace Kirsop, Lawler was for more than fifty years "one of the most distinguished representatives of a remarkable group of [Australian] students of French poetry from Baudelaire to Valéry".

He was a popular teacher who enjoyed the "give and take" of the classroom. He preferred teaching smaller groups where he could "sit in front of a text with ... students and discover it with them, explore the many-sidedness of it, the sound, the different ways of entering into a text". Previous students and colleagues remember him as an "inspirational teacher" and as a "mentor" who set other academics on the "path to a career in French".

== Personal life ==
James Lawler was married to Christiane Labossière, a French citizen and an anthropology graduate. She worked alongside him at the University of Western Australia and played a major role in establishing the French civilisation courses there.

They had two children, Jérôme and Ariane (both born in 1960).

He died 28 July 2013 in Paris at the age of 83. His wife predeceased him in December, 2004. His ashes were interred at the Père Lachaise Cemetery columbarium.

== Select bibliography ==
- Music and Poetry in Apollinaire (Oxford: Blackwell, c. 1957)
- Form and Meaning in Valéry's Le cimetiere marin (Melbourne University Press on behalf of the Australian Humanities Research Council, 1959)
- An Anthology of French Poetry (Melbourne: Oxford University Press, 1960)
- Lecture de Valéry: une étude de Charmes (Paris: Presses Universitaires de France, 1963)
- The Language of French Symbolism (Princeton, N.J.: Princeton University Press, 1969)
- The Poet as Analyst: Essays on Paul Valéry (Berkeley: University of California Press, 1974)
- The Existentialist Marxism of Jean-Paul Sartre (Amsterdam: Grüner, 1976)
- René Char: The Myth and the Poem (Princeton, N.J.: Princeton University Press, c.1978)
- Rimbaud's Theatre of the Self (Cambridge, Mass.: Harvard University Press, 1992)
- Poetry and Moral Dialectic: Baudelaire’s "Secret Architecture" (Madison, N.J.: Fairleigh Dickinson University Press; London and Cranbury, N.J.: Associated University Presses, 1997)

== Honours, awards ==
- 1974 - Guggenheim Fellowship
- 1999 - Prix du rayonnement de la langue française, Académie française
- Prix international des amitiés françaises
- Officier des Palmes Académiques
