= Residential colleges of Rice University =

List and description of individual colleges at Rice University

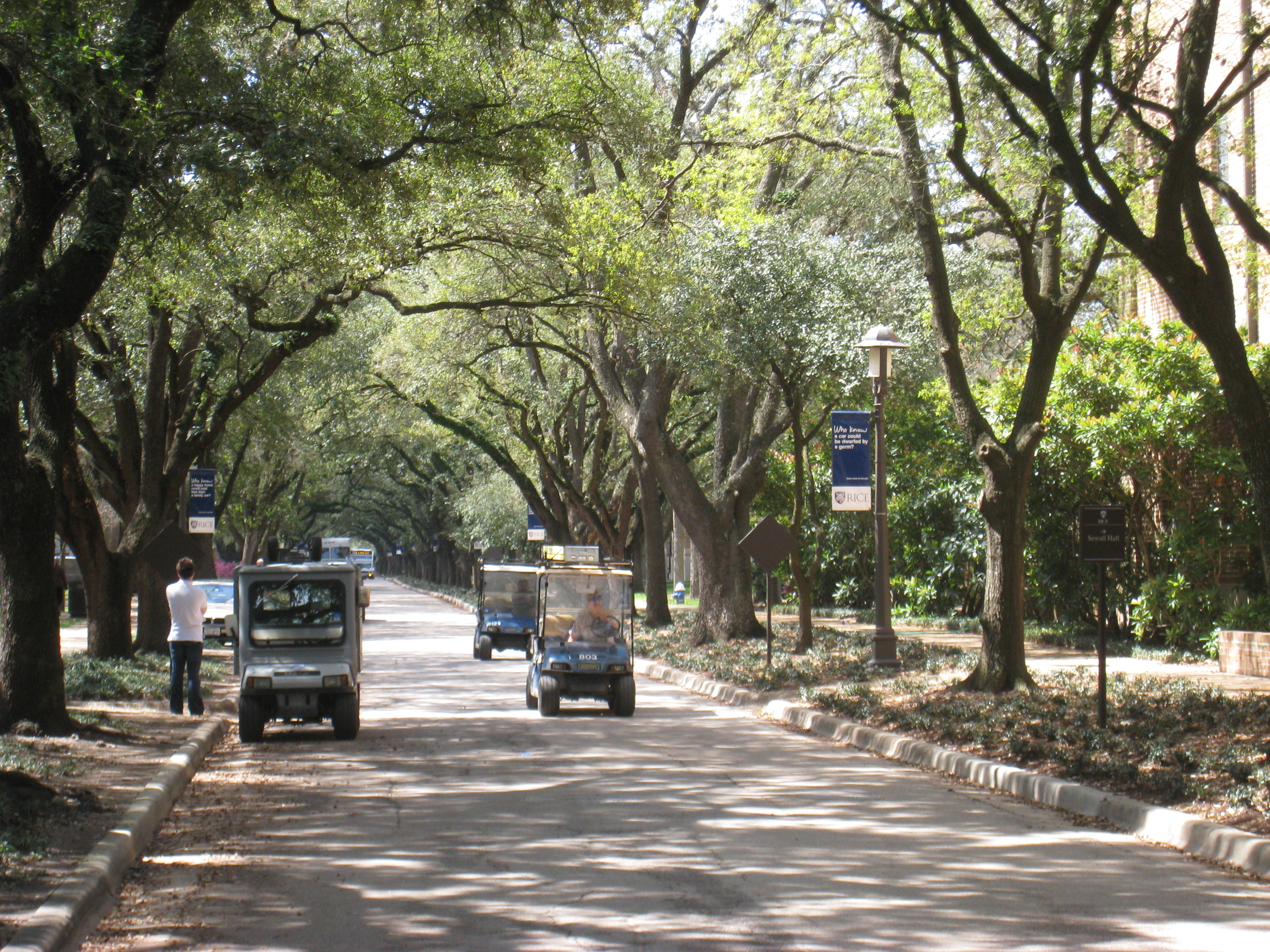
Rice University arboretum (extends across campus)

Rice University contains twelve residential colleges which function as the primary housing, dining, and social organizations for undergraduate students. Each student is randomly affiliated with a residential college upon matriculation and becomes a lifetime member of the college. The residential college system takes the place of a Greek system and has contributed to a sense of community that other universities have sought to emulate.

At academic ceremonies, including matriculation and commencement, the colleges proceed first with the four original colleges in the order Baker, Will Rice, Hanszen, and Wiess, followed by the other colleges in order of founding: Jones, Brown, Lovett, Sid Richardson, Martel, McMurtry, and Duncan. For the original four colleges, which were founded simultaneously in 1957, the processional order reflects the order in which the original "commons" buildings were constructed, though the oldest residential hall built belongs to Will Rice College. For McMurtry and Duncan, which were constructed and opened simultaneously in August 2009, the processional order reflects the order in which the founding gifts were made.

The colleges are often classified by geographical location: Jones, Brown, Martel, McMurtry, and Duncan are the North colleges; Baker, Will Rice, Hanszen, Wiess, Lovett, Sid Richardson, and Chao are the South colleges.

== History of the college system ==
The residential college system was established in 1957 by converting East, South, West, and Wiess (originally and briefly North) Halls into the men's colleges of Baker, Will Rice, Hanszen, and Wiess, respectively. In the same year, Jones, the first residential college became the singular women's college. Brown, Lovett, and Sid Richardson colleges were established between 1965 and 1971. To accommodate increasing enrollment, Martel, McMurtry, and Duncan colleges were constructed between 2001 and 2009. In 2025, the university announced that Chao College, named after Ting Tsung and Wei Fong Chao, would open in 2026, next to the relocated Lovett College and with the two colleges sharing a dining hall.

== Common characteristics ==
=== Architecture ===
Each college except Sid Richardson is built around a quadrangle, which serves as the central court of the college.

Each college building includes three principal structures:

- One or more residential buildings, where on-campus members of the college live. In addition to student rooms in various configurations, the building includes at least two apartments for resident associates. Resident associates are typically junior faculty members; their role is to serve as mentors and counselors to the students of the college.
- A house, usually immediately adjacent to the residential building, in which the college Magister or Magisters live. A Magister is typically a tenured or other senior faculty member who lives at the college with their spouse or family, providing leadership and guidance to the college as a whole and to individual students. (Historically the term Master was reserved for faculty members, while a non-faculty spouse held the title Co-Master. Today, both spouses are known as Magisters.)
- A commons, where college members (including on-campus and off-campus students, Magisters, resident associates, and non-resident associates from the faculty and the community) take their meals and conduct other activities of college life, including study groups, lectures, theatrical productions, and parties. In addition to a large multi-purpose dining hall, each commons typically includes an administrative office belonging to the college coordinator, a private dining room for small group meetings, and other specialized areas.

Each college has a unique architectural style, and as a result there are a great number of different room configurations, with varying levels of modernity and condition.

Each college is also connected to a dining hall, known as a servery. Martel, Jones, and Brown colleges are served by North Servery, while McMurtry and Duncan are served by West Servery. In the South, Hanszen and Wiess colleges are served by South Servery while Will Rice, Lovett and Sid Richardson Colleges are served by Seibel Servery. Baker College has its own servery, Baker Kitchen.

=== Magisters and Resident Associates ===
Each of the residential colleges at Rice has a College Magister, a tenured faculty member and their spouse/family. The Magisters reside in a home adjacent to the college, and help cultivate a variety of cultural and intellectual interests among the students, as well as support an effective system of self-government. They administer the college and serve as liaisons between the students of the college and Rice.

Resident Associates (RAs) are Rice faculty or staff members who reside on campus with students. While each college has many associates, the RAs are selected to live on campus at the college to interact more extensively with the students. They live in apartment suites in the college dormitories, regularly attend meals with students, and are generally active members of student life. McMurtry College and Duncan College, due to their population size, also have Head Resident Fellows, who are meant to ease communication between RAs, the Magisters, and the students.

Two of the longest-serving resident associates in Rice history are Dr. Gilbert Cuthbertson, professor of political science and resident associate at Will Rice College, and William L. Wilson, professor of electrical engineering and resident associate at Wiess College.

=== Governance ===
Each college is in charge of an annual budget in excess of $50,000 and elects a government from its students to administer the college and the budget. The college governments can exert control over everything from event organization to upgrades to the college facilities. Governing documents for many of the colleges can be found online. Singular student presidents and chief justices are university mandated features of each college's government. Additional members vary per college, but typically include Vice President(s), Treasurer, Secretary, and a plurality of representatives from each class. The executive officers, such as the President, Treasurer, and Secretary, form the Executive Council, and the representatives combine with the council to form the college government, known by names such as Cabinet or Parliament, depending on the college. These councils meet weekly to dispense with business related to the organizational and social functioning of the college. The meetings are akin to town hall meetings and typically include refreshments; they also serve as a forum for members of the various clubs, theater groups, and intramural sporting clubs to announce and advertise upcoming events. In addition, each college elects and sends one senator to represent the college at the Student Association Senate.

=== Traditions ===
The traditional campus-wide Beer Bike race is the largest annual student event held on Rice campus and the source of many rivalries and traditions among the residential colleges. Will Rice is known as the most competitive of the residential colleges and the only one to ever "sweep" (win the mens, women, and alumni race), which it has done a total of five times. Other competitive colleges include Hanszen and Jones, while some less ambitious colleges like McMurtry may choose to bike in costumes. In the event of inclement weather on the day of the race, college members participate in a Beer Run to avoid accidents on the track.

== Baker College ==
Baker College
- Location: 6320 Main St., Houston, Texas, United States
- Established: 1957
- Namesake: James Addison Baker (1857–1941)
- Colors: Red Black Silver
- Magisters: Leonardo Duenas-Osorio & Cassy Romano
- President: Sami Johnson
- Chief justice: Evan Park
- Membership: 360 (approximate)
- Mascot: Devil
- Website: baker.rice.edu

James Addison Baker College is named in honor of Captain James A. Baker, friend and attorney of William Marsh Rice, and first chair of the Rice Board of Governors. He served as the Rice Institute's first chairman on the Board of Trustees from June 24, 1891, until his death in 1941. He is known for having helped unravel the conspiracy surrounding the murder of the millionaire, who was chloroformed by his butler, Charles F. Jones, on September 23, 1900. The suspicious death of the Rice founder was concocted by Albert T. Patrick, a New York attorney, who forged a will naming himself the primary beneficiary to the large fortune, enlisting the Butler's help. Captain Baker, however, began an intensive investigation into the death of his employer, discovering the forgery, and returning the foundation to what would become Rice University.

As part of the university's original on-campus housing for male students, a dormitory (South Hall, now part of Will Rice College) and a dining room, library and residential tower (now part of Baker College) were built in 1912 by Cram, Goodhue, & Ferguson of Boston, Massachusetts, at the cost of $137,544.52. The now-Baker commons—with beautiful engraved oak beams and the high vaulted ceilings of Elizabethan design—served as the university's central dining hall for 43 years. East Hall, which contained dormitories and is now referred to as the "Old Wing" of Baker, was completed in summer 1915 (and West Hall (the "Old Wing" of Hanszen College) was completed in 1916). These buildings remained virtually unchanged until the residential college system was instated in 1957. The neoclassical architecture of the former East Hall was joined by a new two-story brick-colored wing, the design of which was shared with equivalent new sections being constructed at Will Rice and Hanszen colleges, in preparation for becoming residential colleges. A house for Baker's Magister was also added. Baker was thus established as one of the five original colleges at Rice in the fall of 1957. In 1973, Baker and Hanszen became the first co-ed colleges at Rice. To include upperclass women, a lottery was held for Jones and Brown women to transfer into Baker.

Baker's colors are traditionally red, silver, and black, and the college associates itself with the devil and hell in its Beer Bike themes and college cheers, with the most popular cheer being "Baker, hell yeah!". The crest was selected, by popular vote, in 1958. The main design is derived from the family crest of Captain Baker's mother, with the owls across the shield indicating the connection to Rice University, and is inscribed with a phrase from Epictetus, which says "[d]ifficulties are things that show what men are." Every year, Baker throws the Baker 90's public party, held in the spring. Some of the biggest social traditions include Baker Christmas in September, the annual Christmas Tree brought home by the freshmen after their camping trip, the Baker Shakespearean play, and of course, Baker 13.

In 2009, construction began on a new residential wing. A portion of the former New Section was renovated and turned over to Lovett College. Baker's new wing is located between the Old Section and the Inner Loop road, and brought with it renovations to Baker's kitchen and the college coordinator's office. It was officially opened back to Baker students in the fall semester of 2010, who returned after a year of co-living with students from Duncan College.

== Will Rice College ==
Will Rice College
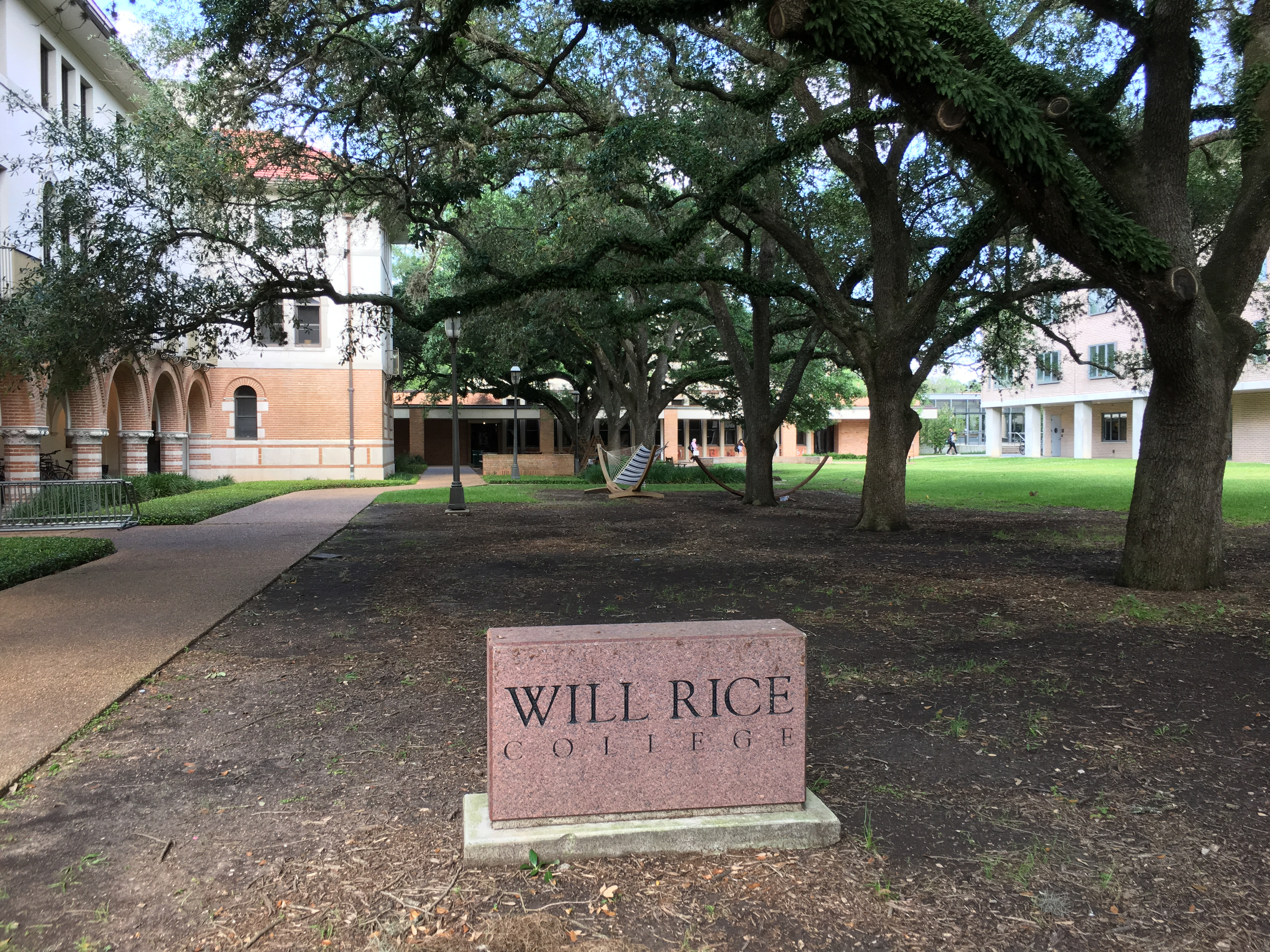
- Will Rice College, with Old Dorm (1912) at left, the commons building at center, and the quadrangle and New Dorm (2009) at right.
- Location: 6330 Main Street, Houston, Texas, United States
- Established: 1957
- Namesake: William Marsh Rice Jr.
- Colors: Rust Gold
- Magisters: Kenton Whitmire
- President: Raye Osayimwese-Sisson
- Chief justice: Grant Xu
- Membership: 400 (approximate)
- Mascot: Phoenix
- Website: willrice.rice.edu

William Marsh Rice Jr. College, commonly known as Will Rice, is named for William M. Rice Jr., the nephew of the university's founder William Marsh Rice. It incorporates Rice's first dormitory, South Hall, which was built in 1912. Will Rice College began as an all-male college when Rice created its residential college system in 1957 and became co-ed in 1978.

Will Rice shares architectural styles with Baker and Hanszen colleges; all three possess white-painted "old" buildings and more modern "new" wings. Will Rice's Old Dorm (former South Hall) features a unique fourth-floor tower which has recently become known as the Perch.

The symbol of Will Rice college is the Phoenix, depicted in rust and gold colors. Members of the college are known as Will Ricers. The college moniker was originally the "College of Individuals," but the "College of Gods and Goddesses" was adopted after the college became co-ed. The elected governing body of Will Rice, the Diet, administers a university-sponsored annual budget of approximately $50,000 which supports social, athletic, and entertainment programs for the college's nearly 400 members.

Will Rice is traditionally a strong contender in the university's annual campus-wide Beer Bike competition among the residential colleges. Will Rice has held the longest winning streak on record in the alumni race (11 years from 1996 to 2006). Since the inclusion of an alumni race, Will Rice has been the only college to have won the men's, women's, and alumni races in a given year, called a "sweep," which it has done on five occasions—1983, 1986, 1999, 2009, and 2013. Additionally, Will Rice holds the current track records for the men's, women's, and alumni races.

In 2009, work began on a new residential building for Will Rice, located on the site of the former New Section, built in 1957; this building was completely demolished. A new servery, Abe and Anne Seibel Servery, was also part of the construction project. The new facility serves both Will Rice and Lovett, replacing two dated cafeterias at each college. During construction, the population of Will Rice lived in McMurtry College, which was founded that year, establishing the two as "sister colleges."

Notable alumni include current CBS News president David Rhodes, former Major League Baseball player Lance Berkman, and architect Charles Renfro of Diller Scofidio + Renfro.

== Hanszen College ==
Hanszen College
- Location: 6350 Main St., Houston, Texas, United States
- Established: 1957 (Original building constructed in 1916)
- Namesake: Harry Clay Hanszen
- Colors: Royal Blue Yellow
- Magisters: Lauren Stadler and Jon Fonbomme
- President: Angela An
- Chief justice: Abigail Jaimes
- Membership: 460
- Mascot: The Guardian
- Website: hanszen.rice.edu

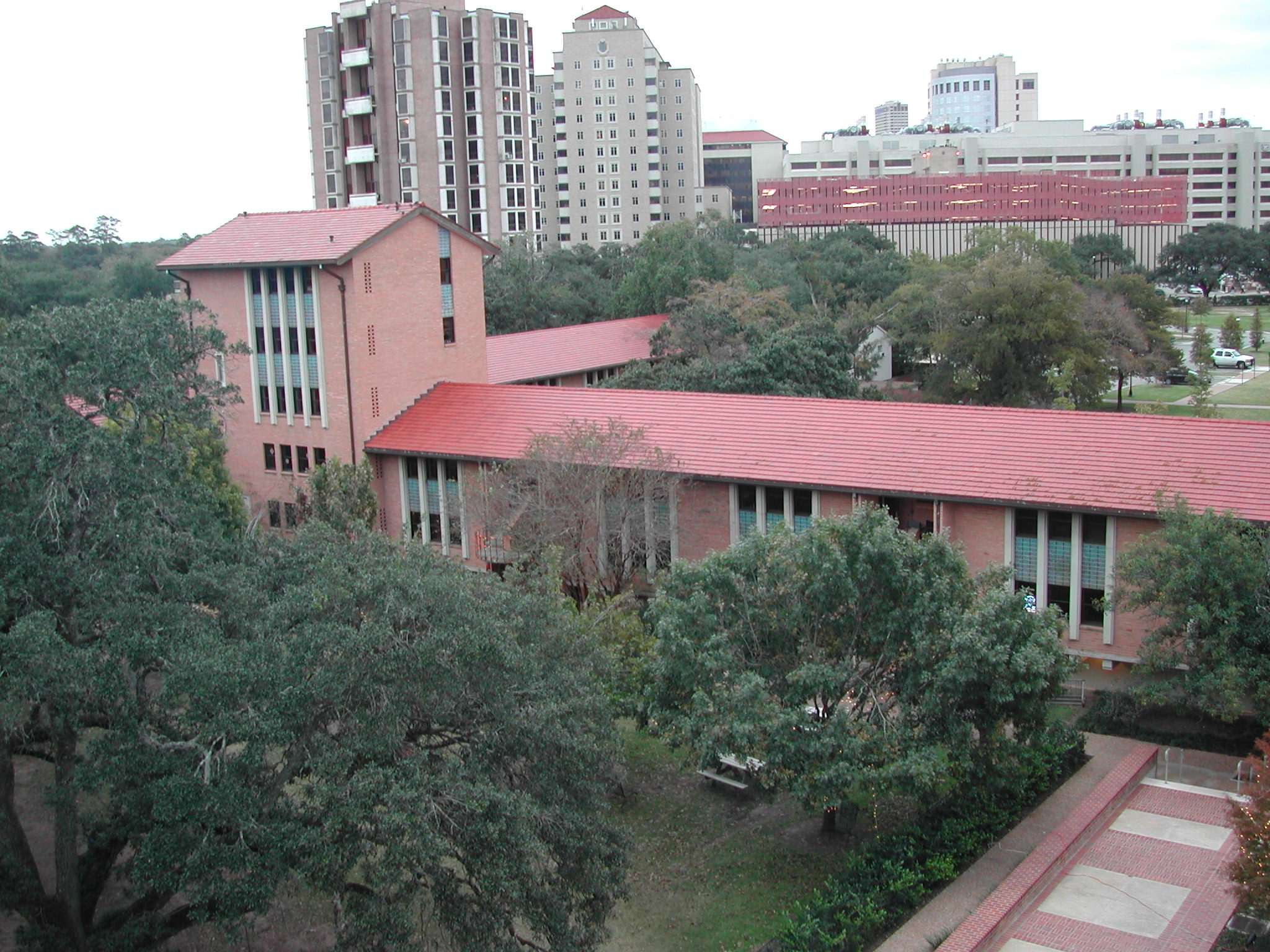
The new wing of Hanszen college

Harry Clay Hanszen College was named for a benefactor to the university and chairman of the Rice Board of Governors from 1946 to 1950. Hanszen's "Old Wing" was known as West Hall when it was built in 1916 as a part of the original campus construction plan by Boston architectural firm Cram, Goodhue & Ferguson. A new housing wing was built in 1957 in conjunction with the development of the residential college system at Rice in response to the expanding undergraduate enrollment.

KTRU Rice Radio, the university's student-run radio station, and Rice Coffeehouse both began at Hanszen College. Hanszen was the first residential college at Rice to use its own crest. Shortly after the founding of the residential college system, the students created the blue, black, and yellow crest that in time became the symbol of the college, setting a precedent for the other colleges.

Hanszen often hosts guest lecturers; recent visitors include College World Series champion Coach Wayne Graham, former Rice president and renowned economist S. Malcolm Gillis, Kinder Institute for Urban Research director Stephen Klineberg, Texas Monthly senior editor and Hanszen alumnus Paul Burka (class of 1963), former writer and executive producer of The Daily Show Adam Lowitt, and senior editor of The Atlantic Dr. James Hamblin. University courses recently offered by Hanszen College have included Analytics in Sports, Spirituality in Film, The Culture of Philanthropy, and Voice Acting.

Hanszen College is governed by Cabinet, a body consisting of the Executive Board and class representatives elected by members of the college annually. Cabinet supervises an annual budget, regulates the use of public spaces within the college, and serves as an official liaison between the College membership and the university administration.

Hanszen's theme song is Hanson's "MMMBop", believed to have been chosen due to the band and the college being homophones.

In 2021 New Section was demolished, and work began on a replacement building that was completed in January 2023. The new New Section's primary structure is made of mass timber, a stronger, lighter, more sustainable option to concrete. Designed by American-German architectural firm Barkow Leibinger it is the largest mass timber building in Texas. The building also incorporates the iconic framed crests and colored tiles from the exterior of the old New Section that once stood on the same land.

== Wiess College ==
Wiess College
- Location: 6340 Main St., Houston, Texas, United States
- Established: 1957 (original building constructed 1949)
- Namesake: Harry Carothers Wiess
- Colors: Goldenrod Black
- Magisters: Flavio Cunha and Fabiana Alves dos Santos
- President: Isabelle Shen
- Chief justice: Virginia Minard
- Membership: 320 (approximate)
- Mascot: The War Pig
- Website: teamwiess.com

The commons at Wiess College

Harry Carothers Wiess College /ˈwaɪs/ was one of the original four colleges created when the residential college system was implemented in 1957. In 2002, Wiess became the only college at Rice to relocate from one building to another. Wiess is currently the southwesternmost residential college, located adjacent to Hanszen and the South Power Plant. Male and female members of Wiess College are known equally as Wiessmen.

Wiess College is named for Harry Carothers Wiess (1887–1948), one of the founders and one-time president of Humble Oil, now ExxonMobil. He was elected as a life member of the Board of Trustees of Rice University in 1944 and appointed vice-chairman in 1946. He left money for the construction of a new dorm after his death in 1948.

Wiess Hall was completed in 1949, but carried the name "North Hall" until its dedication in March 1950. It was laid out as a W-shaped building, with three north–south wings, joined on the north ends by a long east–west spine, forming two open quadrangles. The building was two stories high except for the three-story center wing. The hall was designed to house about 200 students in 20 single and 90 double rooms. Each room at Wiess opened directly to an exterior walkway that wrapped around the entire building. This design incorporated two features that were innovative at the time: every room had a semi-private bathroom and every room (except room 228, which was reserved for freshmen) had windows on at least two sides—an important adaptation in the years before air conditioning.

Wiess Hall became Wiess College in 1957. Converting the dormitory into a college included the creation of two Resident Associate suites, construction of Wiess House, the home of the Master and family, and construction of the Wiess Commons (designed by Wiess undergraduate architecture students Tim "Frog" Barry and Dan Canty for a class project), the eating hall and round-the-clock gathering space for college members.

Because of Wiess's outward-facing architecture, life at Wiess centered on the outdoors. The two quadrangles developed distinct characters. The quad between the center and west wings became known as the "Acabowl" and was the center of the college's social and recreational activity. At various times students installed a trampoline ("Aca-tramp") or above-ground pool ("Aca-pool"). The other quadrangle, between the center and east wings, was known by analogy as the "Backabowl" and tended to be used for quieter activities, such as sunbathing.

The original residential building suffered from rapid deterioration in the 1990s. In 2002, the university opened a new building for the college, located south of the original building. New Wiess encloses a single large quadrangle, which retains the "Acabowl" name. The new building also preserved what Wiessmen considered a salient feature of the old: the fact that all rooms at Wiess open directly onto exterior walkways or balconies. A glass-walled commons forms the north side of the Acabowl, with three four-story residence wings forming the other sides. The portion of the Acabowl immediately adjacent to the commons is known as the Acaterrace. The original Wiess Hall and its adjoining commons were razed during the winter break between Fall 2002 and Spring 2003.

Wiess considers itself to have an intense community spirit, signified by the slogan and cheer "Team Wiess", which has been used consistently since the 1970s.

Aspects of Wiess life include Tabletop Theater, the Ubangee, pumpkin caroling, Hello, Hamlet!, the turning of the statue of university founder William Marsh Rice, the Pace Mannion fan club, and the War Pig. The "Night of Decadence" party was first held in 1972 and quickly became a legendary event at Rice and in Houston, drawing young alumni and students from other universities in addition to Rice students. It was also named to the Top 10 College Parties in America by Playboy magazine. In 2023, campus parties were suspended after that year's Night of Decadence party resulted in dozens of students needing medical treatment for intoxication, seven of whom had to be admitted to the hospital. The Night of Decadence party was permanently banned in an email later sent out to students by Dean Gorman. In this email, she stated that Wiess will need to decide on a new theme for their party and that no college may host a party similarly themed to NOD in the future.

One of the most influential persons in Wiess history was electrical engineering professor William L. Wilson, who served as resident associate from 1978 to 2006 and as interim Master in 1982–83, which was also the year in which Wiess became a co-ed college. Wilson, known to generations of students as "Dr. Bill", was a fixture of Rice's college system and the keeper of many Wiess traditions. In addition to his many teaching awards, he is the only person to have won the Student Association's Mentor Recognition Award twice. After his unexpected death in January 2009, a memorial service was held at the Wiess commons. In December 2009, the Rice board of Trustees, with the consent of Wiess College, decided that the new Masters' residence at Wiess will be named Wilson House, in honor of Dr. Bill. Dedicated on March 11, 2011, Wilson House is the first building at Rice named after a college Master or Resident Associate, and the first Masters' residence to bear a name distinct from that of its associated college.

Notable Wiessmen include Walter Loewenstern (1958), Harold Solomon, Ricky Pierce (1982), Maryana Iskander (1997), and Anthony Rendon.

== Jones College ==
Jones College
- Location: 23 Sunset Blvd., Houston, Texas, United States
- Established: 1957
- Namesake: Mary Gibbs Jones
- Colors: Light Blue; Green; Purple
- Magisters: Zachary and Trisha Ball
- President: Zack Donovan <https://jones.rice.edu/studentgov>
- Chief justice: Sam Forman <https://jones.rice.edu/studentgov>
- Membership: 325 (approximate)
- Mascot: Jabberwocky, JIBACat (unofficial), Marley Mackenzie
- Website: jones.rice.edu

Mary Gibbs Jones College, built as the first women's dormitory at Rice University, is named after Mary Gibbs Jones, wife of prominent Houston philanthropist Jesse Holman Jones. Jesse H. Jones supported its initial construction with a $1 million donation.

The college was built in 1957, consisting of two four-story structures named "North" and "South." It was designed by architects Lloyd & Morgan. Not only was it the first housing for women on campus, it was also the first building designed specifically as a residential college and also the first building to be centrally air-conditioned. Lloyd & Morgan used pink marble in the construction of Jones College to indicate its status as housing for female students. In 2002, an additional four-story building, "Central," was built in between North and South. The new building connects to both original buildings at every level except the ground floor (a short walk separates South and Central). The wing was designed by noted post-modern architect Michael Graves.

In the early days, the culture of the all-female Jones College was quite conservative. At meals, each table had a hostess, and dinner was served family style. Strict rules were enforced by house mothers when men from the south colleges visited the female students. The students even had to abide by a strict curfew - 11 p.m. on weekdays and 2 a.m. on weekends. In the 1970s, Jones began phasing out many of the strictest rules, and in the fall of 1980 Jones became co-ed. Male students from the south colleges were given the chance to apply for transfer to Jones. Lovett, another Rice residential college, went co-ed the same year, so many of the new Jones residents were former Lovett residents. Jones women who disagreed with the decision to go co-ed were allowed to transfer to Brown College, which remained all-female until 1987. In 2001, construction began on the new Jones Commons and Jones Central. The new Jones Commons opened for use in March 2002. Jones Central opened in August 2002. During the same time, Jones lost its parking lot to the newly constructed Martel College.

Jones' student government is set up as a Cabinet comprising the Executive Officers, elected representatives from each floor, and one elected off-campus representative. The Cabinet meets bi-weekly.

Jones is a college with an indoor setup which has two lounges on every floor. Jones is unique among the colleges due to its large number of singles. Jones also has four 4-single suites and two 6-single suites, along with regular doubles.

Previous Jones College Magisters include Dr. Franz Brotzen (former Rice University Dean of Engineering) and Dr. Robin Forman (former Rice University Dean of Undergraduates). The current Jones College Magister is Dr. Zachary Ball who is the Faculty Director for the Institute of Biosciences and Bioengineering.

Notable alumni from Jones include George P. Bush (1998), former Mayor of Houston Annise Parker (1978), and neuroscientist David Eagleman (1993).

== Brown College ==
Brown College
- Location: 9 Sunset Blvd., Houston, Texas, United States
- Motto: Tende Bene Alta Pete
- Established: 1965
- Namesake: Margarett Root Brown
- Colors: Maroon Gold
- Magisters: B.J. and Shirley Fregly
- President: Holden Koch
- Chief justice: Diane Moturi
- Membership: 353
- Website: brown.rice.edu

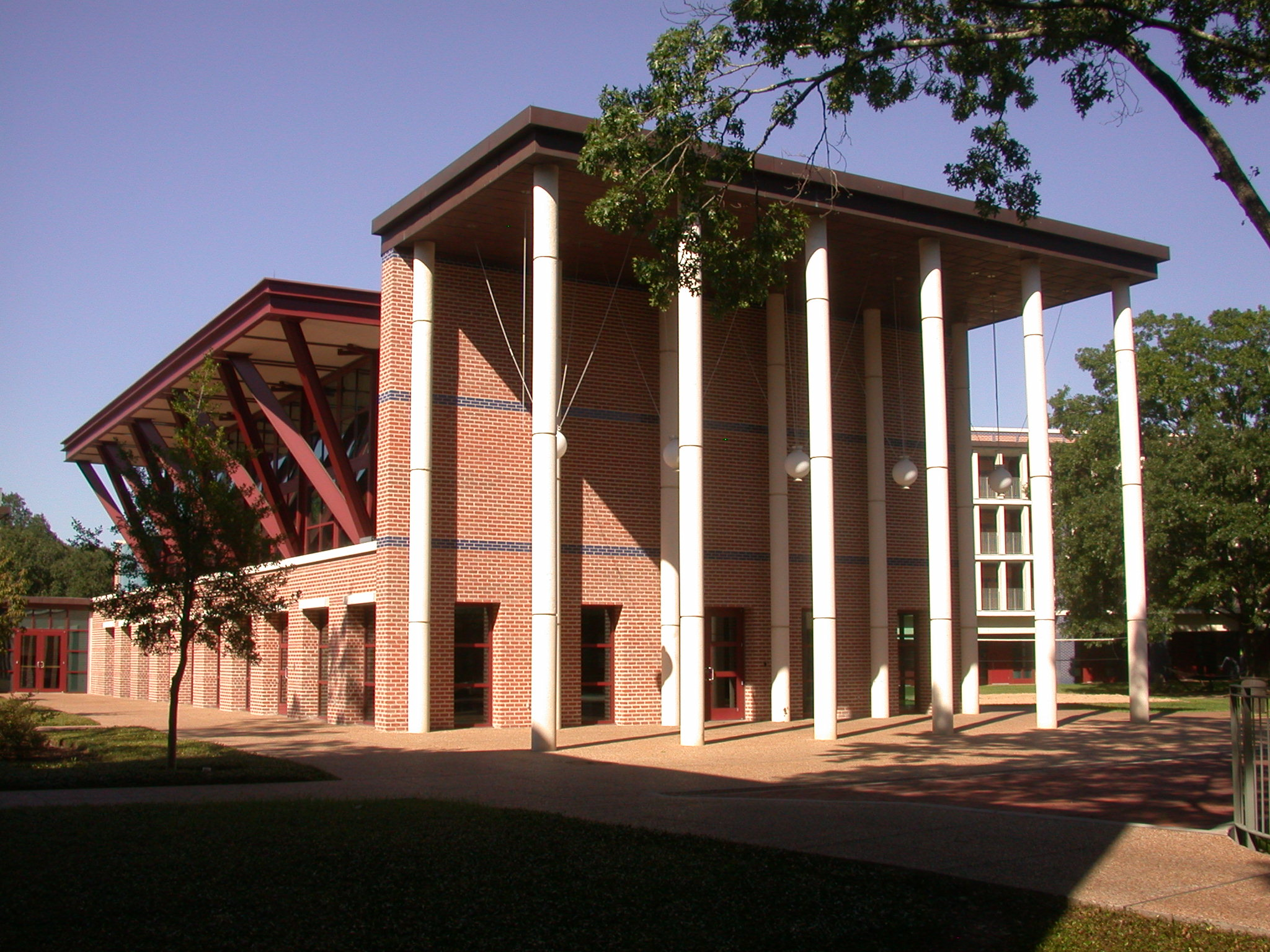
The new Brown College commons

Margarett Root Brown College is currently the third largest of the eleven residential colleges at Rice, nearby both McMurtry College and Duncan College. Founded in 1965 as an all-women's college, Brown became co-ed in 1987.

The history of Brown dates back to the early sixties, when Jones College was the only all women's college on campus. This caused such a severe housing shortage that some Rice women were housed in the dorms of nearby Texas Women's University. Through the generous $1 million donation of George R. Brown and his wife Alice Pratt Brown, a new women's residential college was established in the memory of their sister-in-law, Margarett Root Brown. Up until her death in 1985, Alice Pratt Brown was an active patron of the college, giving the college much of the furniture and art in the first floor lobbies and private dining room.

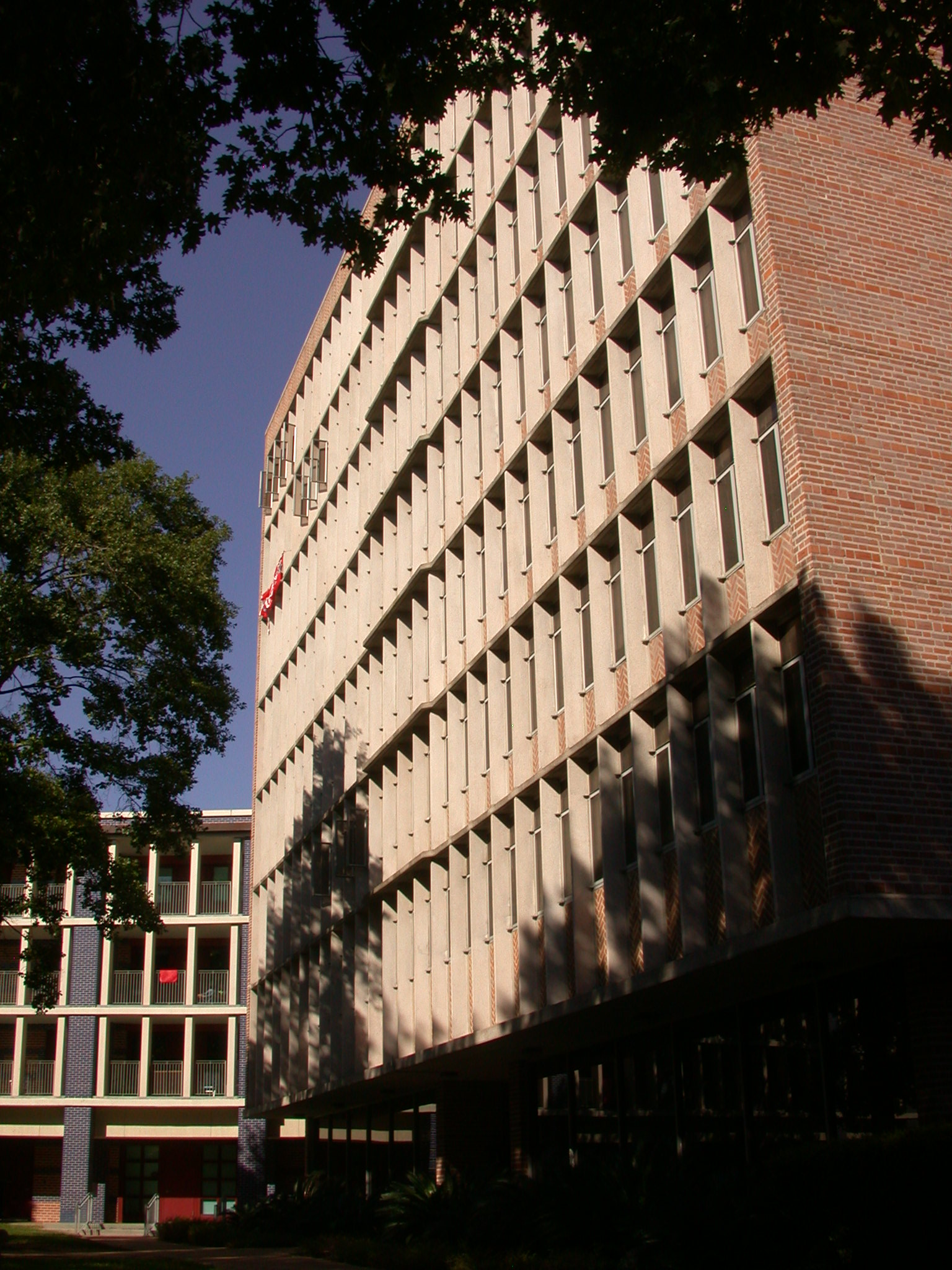
The old wing of Brown College

In the beginning, Brown College was filled primarily with women who had volunteered to leave Jones in order to start a new college. Brown had a housemother who lived in the resident associate’s apartment and required all women to check in and out of the building at night and on weekends. The first Master of Brown was Frank Vandiver, who later became president of Texas A&M. In 1966 he resigned from Brown because of a “scandal” – the members of Brown voted to drink alcohol in their own rooms (provided they were of legal drinking age). Vandiver resigned because he considered it inappropriate behavior for young ladies.

Brown was the last single-sex female college after Jones went co-ed in 1980; male members were first accepted into Brown in 1987. However, the community bathrooms on all floors remained coed until 1994, when the bathrooms were remodeled and separate facilities for men and women were built on each floor. Brown's main tower consists of mainly of double rooms whose residents share community bathrooms. Each floor also has one single room without a bathroom, as well as a double room with a bathroom, referred to as a suite. The new 4-story wing at Brown opened in 2002. The new wing houses 56 additional students, making Brown the largest residential college on campus (it was previously the smallest) until the opening of McMurtry and Duncan. The new wing is made up of four-person suite, and each suite has four small single rooms, a large common room, and a private bathroom. Besides rooms, Brown offers other facilities. For instance, Brown's basement houses a communal laundry room and music practice rooms. Brown's first floor, referred to as "Vator Lobby" in reference to its use as an elevator lobby, contains a communal kitchen, a computer lab, couches, and amenities such as a projector and pool tables.

== Lovett College ==
Lovett College
- Location: 6310 Main St., Houston, Texas, United States
- Established: 1968
- Namesake: Edgar Odell Lovett
- Colors: Navy Blue Yellow
- Magisters: Dr. Michael Gustin and Denise Klein
- President: Ayush Suresh
- Chief justice: Kaz Nam
- Membership: 355 (approximate)
- Mascot: Stag
- Website: lovett.rice.edu

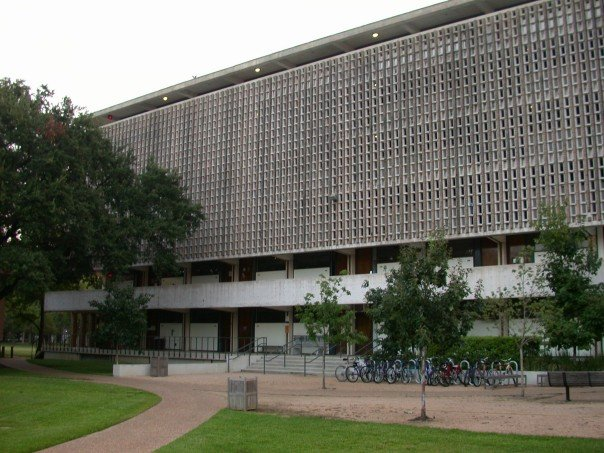
The residential building of Lovett College

Edgar Odell Lovett College is the seventh-founded residential college, named after the university's first president. Lovett's first class mostly comprised volunteers from other colleges. Lovett sponsors numerous community and social events throughout the year, including theater production, the Lovett Undergraduate Research Symposium, and many gatherings on the College's seconds floor and sundeck. Lovett's college crest is based upon the Lovat family crest although the Lovat family is not related to Edgar Odell Lovett.

Lovett College during construction

The distinctive brutalist architecture of Lovett has led many to compare it to a giant toaster. This is due to the concrete grating that surrounds the third, fourth, and fifth floors, a design feature intended to make Lovett riot-proof in reaction to the student riots of the late 1960s, most notably the Abbie Hoffman riot of April 1970.

In 2009, work began on renovating a portion of Baker College's former New Section, which was transferred over to become Lovett's New Section starting in the 2010 fall semester. This building is affectionately referred to as "Stinky" by the students, though the name does not refer to the building's smell. A new servery, shared with Will Rice College, was built as part of the construction project and named Seibel Servery. As of the completion of Sid Richardson College's new building in Spring 2022, Seibel Servery connects Lovett to both Will Rice and Sid Richardson Colleges.

Notable alumni include Trey Murphy III, James Casey, Luke Willson, José Cruz Jr., John Doerr, Saint Arnold Brewing Company founders Brock Wagner and Kevin Bartolt, John Kline, NASA Administrator Jim Bridenstine, Ann Saterbak, Alberto Gonzales, and Matt Anderson. Nobel Laureate Robert Curl was the first college Master, and George H. W. Bush served as a community associate.

== Sid Richardson College ==
Sid Richardson College
- Location: 6360 Main Street, Houston, Texas, United States
- Motto: Mors de Super
- Established: 1971
- Namesake: Sid W. Richardson
- Colors: Black Red Gold
- Magister: Melissa Marschall
- President: Arjun Surya
- Chief justice: Sophia Lannie
- Membership: 332
- Mascot: Tower
- Website: sidrich.rice.edu

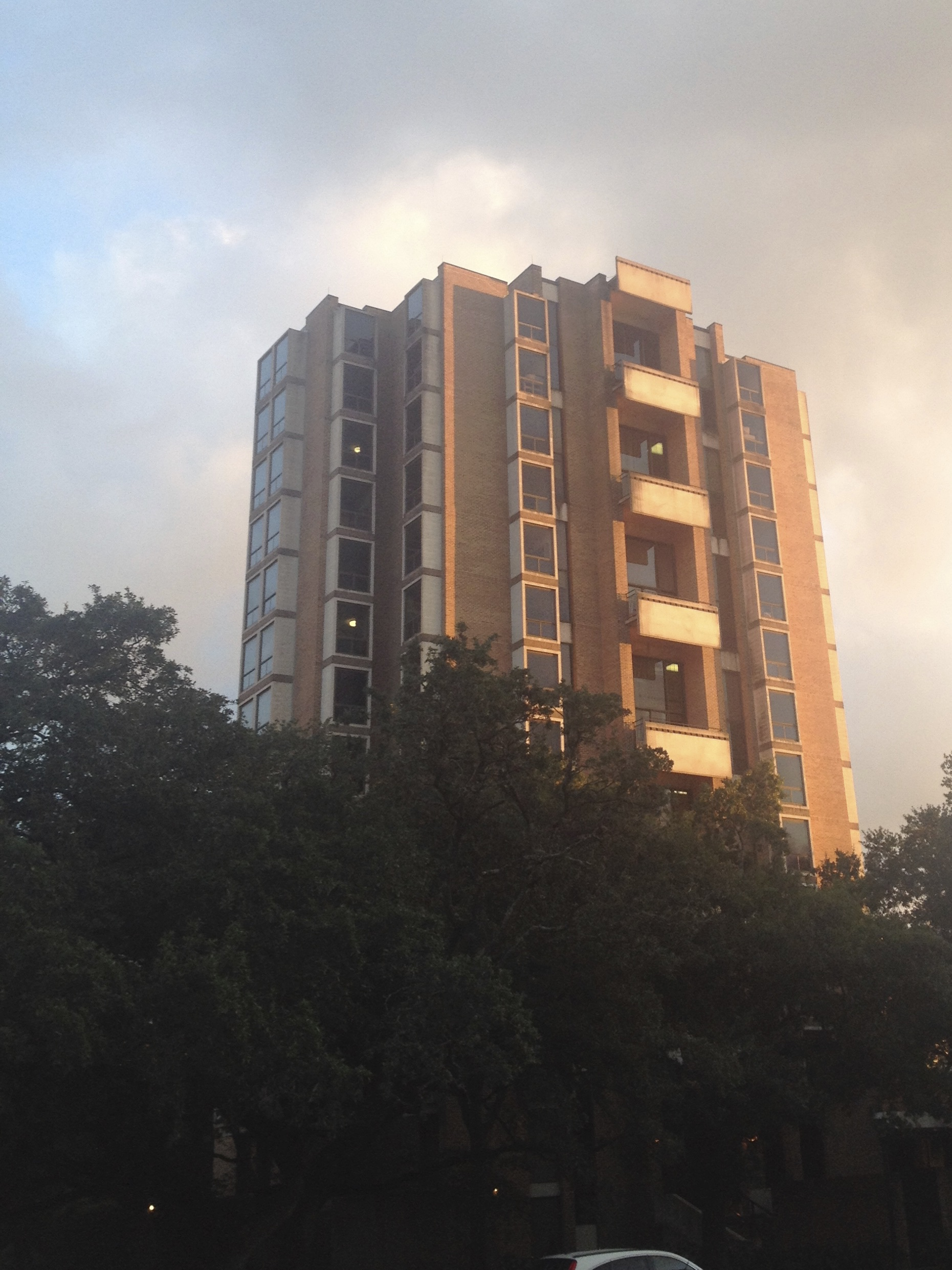
Sid Richardson College as seen from the North side.

Sid Richardson College (also referred to as Sid, SRC, or Sid Rich) opened in 1971 as a men's residential college. Like the other residential colleges on the Rice campus, Sid Richardson College provides undergraduate residential and dining facilities, social organizations and student government, as well as faculty, alumni, and community associates. A $2 million pledge from the Sid Richardson Foundation, which was established by Texas oilman, cattleman, and philanthropist Sid W. Richardson (1891–1959), funded the construction of the college. The college became co-ed in 1987. Members of Sid Richardson College are called "Sidizens."

Sid Richardson College is the tallest building on the Rice campus. It has seven floors, each of which is split into an upper and lower level, effectively giving the building fourteen stories. Unusual among Rice buildings, the 153 feet (47 m) high-rise was a response to a shortage of University land and was designed by the architectural firm Neuhaus and Taylor. Sid Rich has enough beds to accommodate 229 students. Original plans called for the eventual construction of a second tower, but the plan was never followed through. In similar fashion to Lovett, the Sid Masters' house is connected to the residential tower; it comprises the first floor of the tower, while the mezzanine of the residential building is actually the second floor of the tower. The first floor of Sid features a commons, a private dining room, and an OC (off-campus) lounge. The lounge consists of a pool table, a ping pong table, and a television set.

Although Sid Richardson College is not built around a quad, there is a similar outdoor feature of the college known as the "country club." The country club consists of a field, volleyball court, hammock, an adult-sized swing set, and many picnic tables.

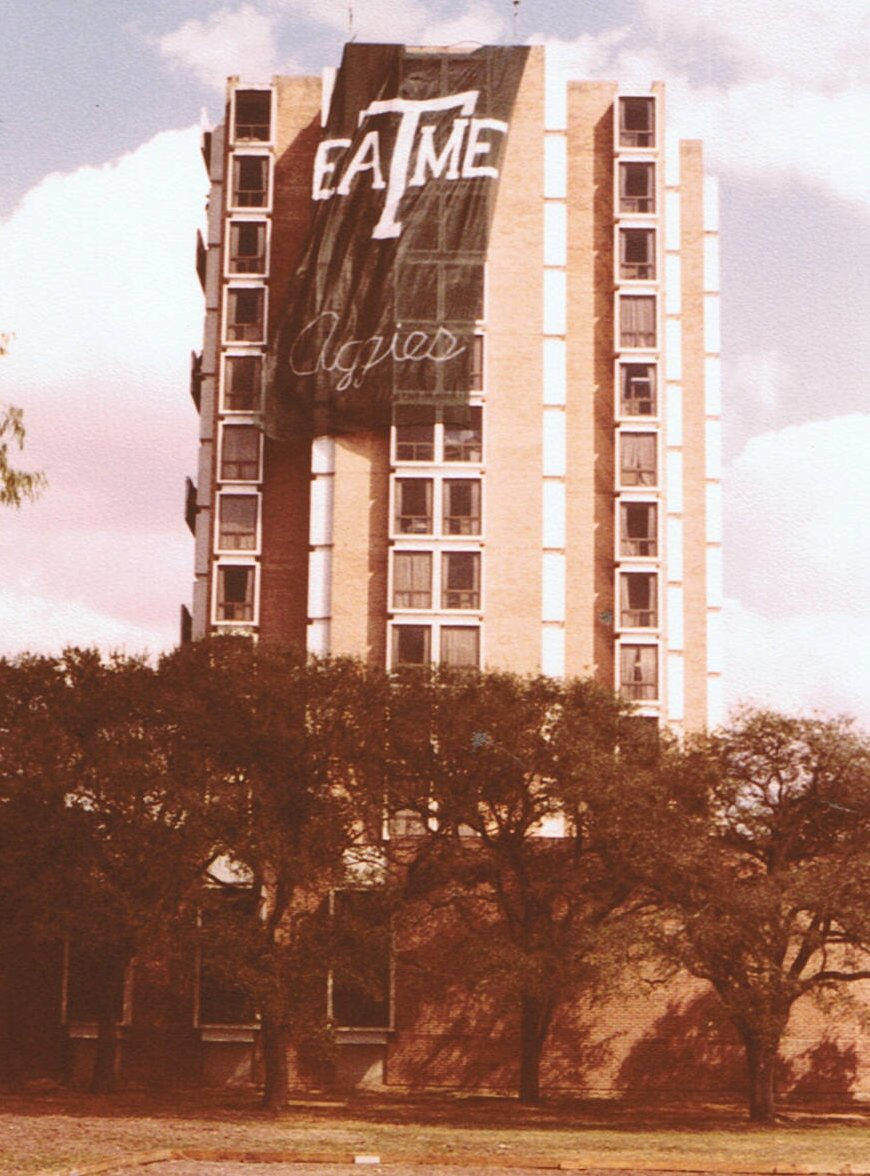
A banner hung from Sid during a game against the Aggies copyright Michael Petry

In addition to providing basic residential and social services to its residents, Sid Richardson College is rich with traditions, which have included some notorious pranks. For example, Sidizens have made use of the six balconies towering above the main entrance of the college to "douche" unsuspecting visitors—including past Rice University president George Rupp and his wife—with buckets of water as they climb the steps to the double doors. While such "free-flowing water" is the only sanctioned projectile, rogue students have also flung flour tortillas, shrimp, and, in one particularly infamous situation, a couch. During the mid-1970s, students moved a Karman Ghia automobile into the dining area. Photographic evidence can be found in the Rice Campanile.

Another prank that is quickly becoming a tradition is the Orc Raid. Orc Raids are held twice every year - once during the Orientation Week in August before the start of the Fall semester and a second time during Willy Week in the Spring semester. Sidizens dress up by smearing themselves with black paint, wearing black clothes and carrying around torches with doll heads. They then proceed to run around campus at night to terrorize the other colleges and crash events, often shouting out cheers that boost the morale of the Sidizens as well as anti-cheers meant to belittle the 'lesser' colleges.

Sid Richardson College has a wealth of traditions. Every Friday afternoon from 3:00-6:00pm, the college's main speakers, affectionately known as the "stacks," blast music in what is known as "Radio Free Sid" (the named derived from Radio Free Europe of the Cold War era) across the campus from the 7th floor balcony. Radio Free Sid begins and ends each roughly 3-hour-long set of music with AC/DC's "Back in Black," widely considered to be the college's theme song. Other traditions include Night of Innocence (a showing of Disney movies in the commons the same night as NOD), Sid 80s (Sid's fall public party), Sid Hi-Liter (spring public party), vatoring of Sidizens who co-advise, Floor Wars (a series of competitive events between the floors), Squid Richardson Day, and more.

Sid Richardson has also hosted the five Houston Conferences on Theoretical Neuroscience (2004-2009), thanks to a relationship between the GCC and former Sid Richardson Master Steve Cox.

Notable alumni include Steve Jackson, Philip Humber, White House Press Secretary Josh Earnest, and Mark Durcan, CEO of Micron Technology.

== Martel College ==
Martel College
- Location: 99 Sunset Blvd., Houston, Texas, United States
- Established: 2002
- Namesake: Marian and Speros P. Martel
- Colors: Azure (sky blue) , argent (white) , maroon
- Magisters: Daniel Domingues and Livia Borges Domingues
- President: Nathan Calzat
- Chief justice: Orion Pope
- Membership: 350 (approximate)
- Mascot: Beer Goat
- Website: martel.rice.edu

Martel's sally port

The rotunda, with the sundeck

The cathedral-like Commons

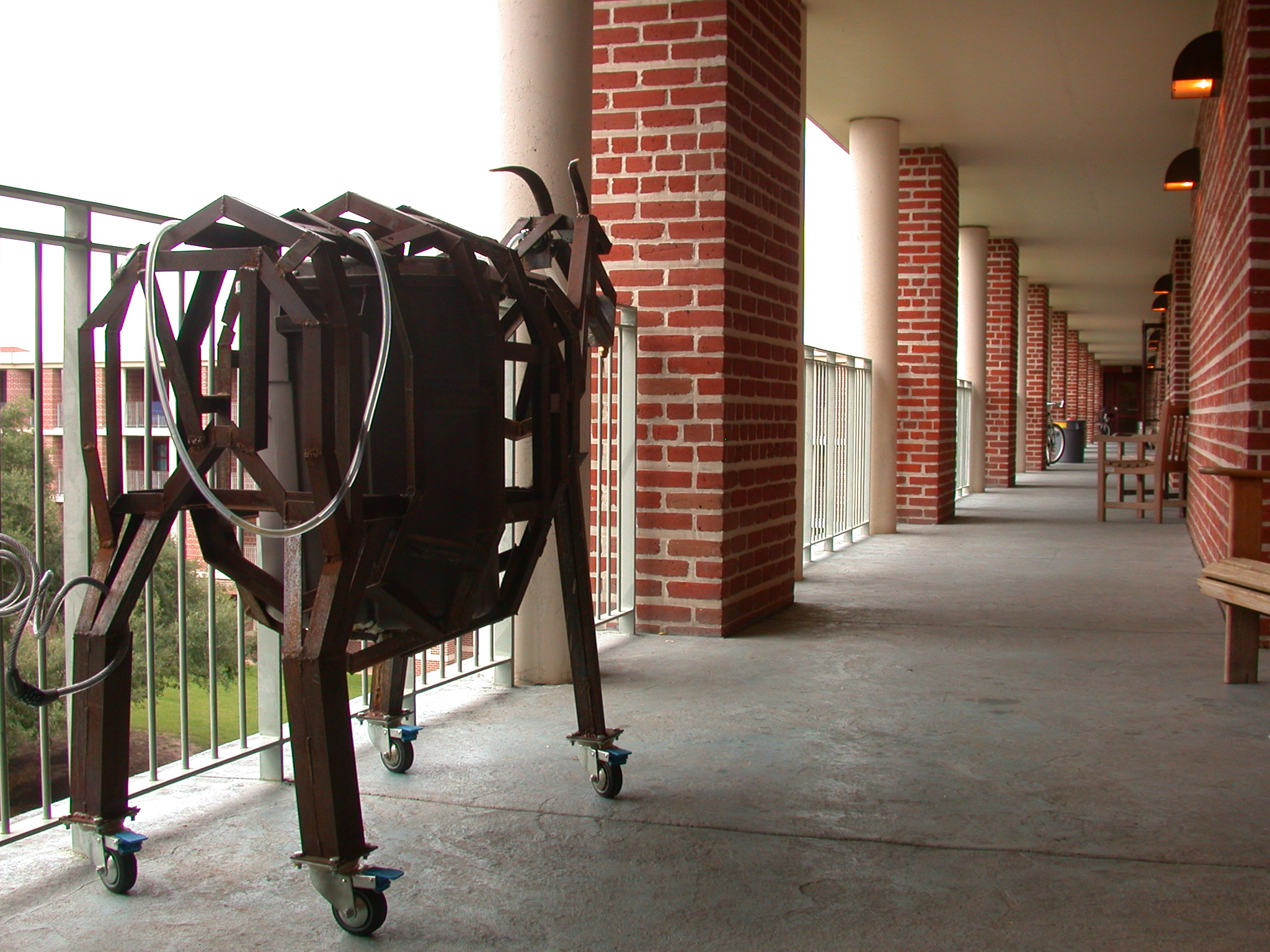
The infamous "Beer Goat" keg holder

Marian and Speros P. Martel College is the ninth-founded residential college. It was established with a $15 million donation from the eponymous Marian and Speros Martel Foundation, a longtime benefactor of Rice University. The college's building was designed by noted architect Michael Graves and housed its first students during the 2002–2003 school year. Martel is one of eleven residential colleges at Rice University, and it is the only one that has a Sallyport of its own; it is located adjacent to Jones and Duncan colleges on the north side of campus, sharing the North Servery with the former. The college prides itself on its adopted Greek heritage, a tribute to its benefactors' country of origin. Aspects of Greek culture are incorporated into a number of college events, and an interior staircase of the college features a four-story map of Athens painted by Joshua Krezinski (class of 2007). The second and fourth quadrants of Martel's crest represent the cross and stripes of the Greek flag, while the other two are reserved for the Athenian owl, a symbol of wisdom taken from the university's academic seal, and the "MC" glyph representing the College's name. The crest was designed by the building's architect. The Martel College colors are representative of the Greek flag and the building's architecture. The blazon of the Greek flag is "Azure, four bars Argent; on a canton of the field a Greek cross throughout of the second." While azure often associates with a deeper blue, Martel College uses a lighter tincture of azure known as bleu celeste or "sky blue". Also, the argent used by the college favors a bright, reflective white instead of the more silvery tincture. Maroon represents the building's brick and paint scheme. Members of Martel college are known as "Martelians".

As the third-most-recently founded residential college, Martel's history is short, and commonly includes the story of Speros Martel, the Greek immigrant whose estate provided the funding necessary to build the college. The official groundbreaking of the new Martel college took place on April 10, 2000. Among those attending were the newly instated Martel Magisters Joan and Arthur Few, who had previously been Masters at Baker College from 1994 to 1999.

The first new students accepted as members of Martel were required to live off campus during the fall 2001 semester until the completion of the College's construction, which was scheduled for early 2002. However, in June 2001, Tropical Storm Allison struck the Houston area and delayed this by two months. Applications for freshman transfers were made available in October 2002. Sixty-three freshmen were accepted, five each from Brown and Jones Colleges, and up to 12 from each of the other colleges. Martel members named physics instructor Gary Morris and intramural sports director Tina Villard as Martel's first resident associates.

Martel's student government is named the Parliament, and meets weekly in the College commons. Elected officials include President, Vice President, Prime Minister, Treasurer, Secretary, Chief Justice, and Class Representatives (4 per class).

Michael Graves, architect of Martel College, designed the four-story, 134,000-square-foot (12,400 m^{2}) building. Formed around a central quadrangle, Graves's design follows the style of the 1910 general plan of Boston architect Ralph Adams Cram for the Rice campus. Martel is an open, four-sided shape. Each side of the shape forms a wing of the college. The wings terminate on the side closest to North Servery in a five-story rotunda, a spiral staircase enclosed within a stack of rounded floors, providing the college with its sundeck, where many events are held. The easternmost wing contains common areas, the game room, a kitchen, and the TV room. The rotunda leads into the Commons, a cathedral-like room with a high ceiling that serves as a cafeteria, meeting room, and auditorium, among other functions. The college also includes two apartments for Martel's resident associates and a neighboring house for the College Magisters and their family. Nearly every room at Martel is suite style, and is either referred to as a hex, or a quad. There are two kinds of hexes, sally port and corner hexes. Corner hexes have 6 single rooms and sallyport hexes have 3 double rooms. Every suite at martel has a private bathroom. Rooming is overseen by the Vice President. Martel is also the only college to feature a sally port in its construction; newly matriculated students traditionally walk through it passing a torch between themselves as the final step to becoming new Martelians.

Alumni include Chris Boswell, Pittsburgh Steelers kicker, Jason Colwick, 2009 NCAA pole vault champion, Andrew Chifari, Starbucks most expensive drink record breaker, Mithun Mansinghani, the Oklahoma Solicitor General, and Morris Almond, a professional basketball player.

== McMurtry College ==
McMurtry College
- Location: 1605 Rice Blvd., Houston, Texas, United States
- Established: 2009
- Namesake: Burt and Deedee McMurtry
- Colors: Royal Purple Silver
- Magisters: Jenifer Bratter and Noe Perez
- President: Berny Guerra Arthur
- Chief justice: Carmine Steiner
- Membership: 420 (approximate)
- Mascot: Lion
- Website: mcmurtry.rice.edu

Burt and Deedee McMurtry College is the tenth college founded as part of Rice's residential college system. McMurtry College was named after Burt and Deedee McMurtry, graduates of the Rice class of 1956. Burt McMurtry was part of the student-faculty committee that evaluated the need for and eventually instituted the college system at Rice University, beginning in 1957 with the original five colleges. The college was conceived jointly with the adjacent Duncan College as part of Rice's vision for the 2nd century, which includes plans to increase the size of the student body by 30%. The college opened on August 16, 2009.

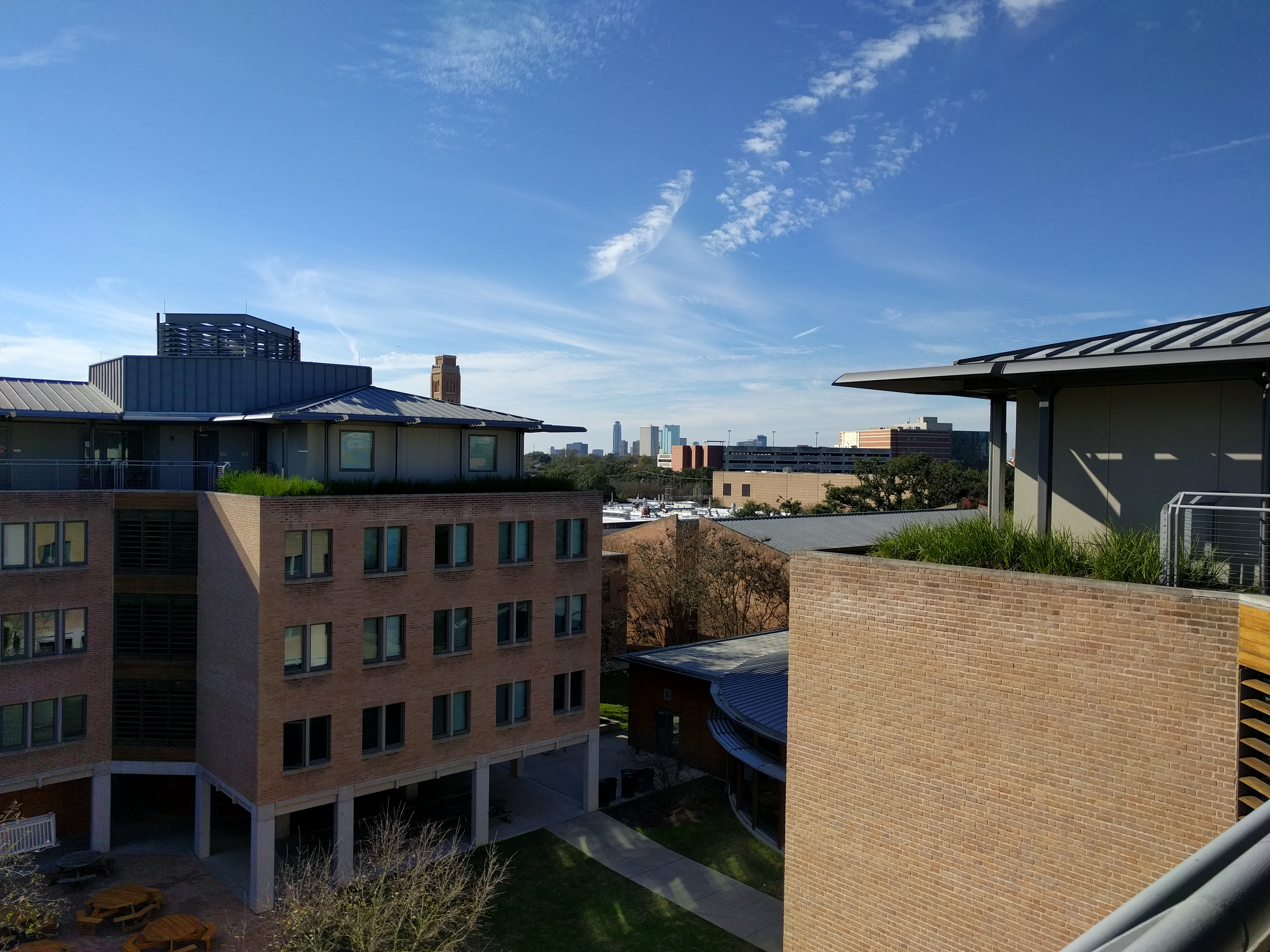
View of McMurtry college quad from roof deck

Despite its status as a young college, McMurtry has already established its own unique culture. During the Spring 2009 Beer Bike, McMurtry was christened in the Thresher newspaper as the "Mongol College", as it had not been finished at the time yet it was involved in pranks during Willy Week, and it could not be pranked by any other college as McMurtry wasn't complete. This was due to O-Week coordinators and advisers and co-advisers of McMurtry (chosen a semester ahead) showing their spirit for the upcoming new college. McMurtry has been assuming much of this "Mongol" culture by referring to the round commons as "Yurt," a name that also references the fact that due to construction delays caused by Hurricane Ike, McMurtry was forced to use a tent as its commons for weeks until the actual commons was completed. McMurtry is also known as the banana college, and the fruit is used as a popular symbol by students, including in college cheers like "McMurtry is bananas, B-A-N-A-N-A-S."

The building was designed by Hopkins Architects, a leading English firm specializing in sustainable architecture. It offers 324 beds for student housing. The college is constructed as a single, squared-off horseshoe-shaped wing surrounding a central quad, rising to a height of five stories. The college has double and single rooms that open directly out onto interior hallways, in contrast to the exterior hallways at Martel and Wiess, which were previously the two most recently renovated colleges. Common showers are located around the stairwells at each "elbow" in the building, and fully functional pod bathrooms are located in each double bedroom. The first floor contains study rooms, a game room, music room, other amenities, and the only circular commons on campus.

McMurtry College is across from Duncan Hall and the Inner Loop road. Duncan College is immediately north of it, connected to McMurtry by West Servery, which is parallel to Abercrombie Engineering Laboratory. It is also identical to Duncan College. The pair are commonly referred to as McDuncan.

== Duncan College ==
Duncan College
- Location: 1601 Rice Blvd., Houston, Texas, United States
- Motto: Classis et Germanitas (Team and Family)
- Established: 2009
- Namesake: Anne and Charles Duncan
- Colors: Forest Green Ivory Gold
- Magisters: Eden King and Winston Liaw
- President: Taylor Schultz
- Chief justice: Bela Koshy
- Membership: 470 (approximate)
- Mascot: Kangaroo
- Website: duncan.rice.edu

Anne and Charles Duncan College is the eleventh college founded as part of Rice's residential college system. Duncan College was named after Anne and Charles Duncan Jr., long-standing contributors to Rice University who donated money for the new college. The college was conceived jointly with the adjacent McMurtry College as part of Rice's Vision for the 2nd century, which includes plans to increase the size of the student body by 30%. Duncan opened its doors on August 16, 2009, right in time for O-Week 2009, which saw the arrival of the first Duncan freshman class. Due to renovations in Baker College and in order to help the new college adapt to the university, Baker College students lived in Duncan with the first freshman class. This led to the joint name of "BaDunc" for sporting and other events. Duncan began to operate by itself beginning in fall 2010 with a new freshman class, a returning sophomore class, and upperclassmen consisting of students from other colleges who accepted invitations to transfer. The college's first Masters, Marnie Hylton and Luis Duno-Gottberg, remained with Duncan for several years, and the final constitution went through its final stages before approval. It has also chosen its colors as forest green, white, and gold. It chose government officials, RAs, and a College Coordinator in the spring of 2010, and the crest was revealed during the fall 2010 semester at the dedication ceremony.

Due to the request and contribution of Anne and Charles Duncan, Duncan College is one of the "greenest" buildings on Rice campus, as well as the entire city of Houston. Like nearby McMurtry College, the five-story building was designed by Hopkins Architects of London and offers 324 beds for student housing. The building is the first gold-level Leadership in Energy and Environmental Design (LEED) facility at Rice and the first LEED student residential-housing in the United States. The facility is designed to retain water for irrigation purposes and has motion detector lights which will turn on or off according to the flow of people. The building will decrease energy consumption by up to 25% as well as cut back on water usage. Air conditioners power off when windows are opened.

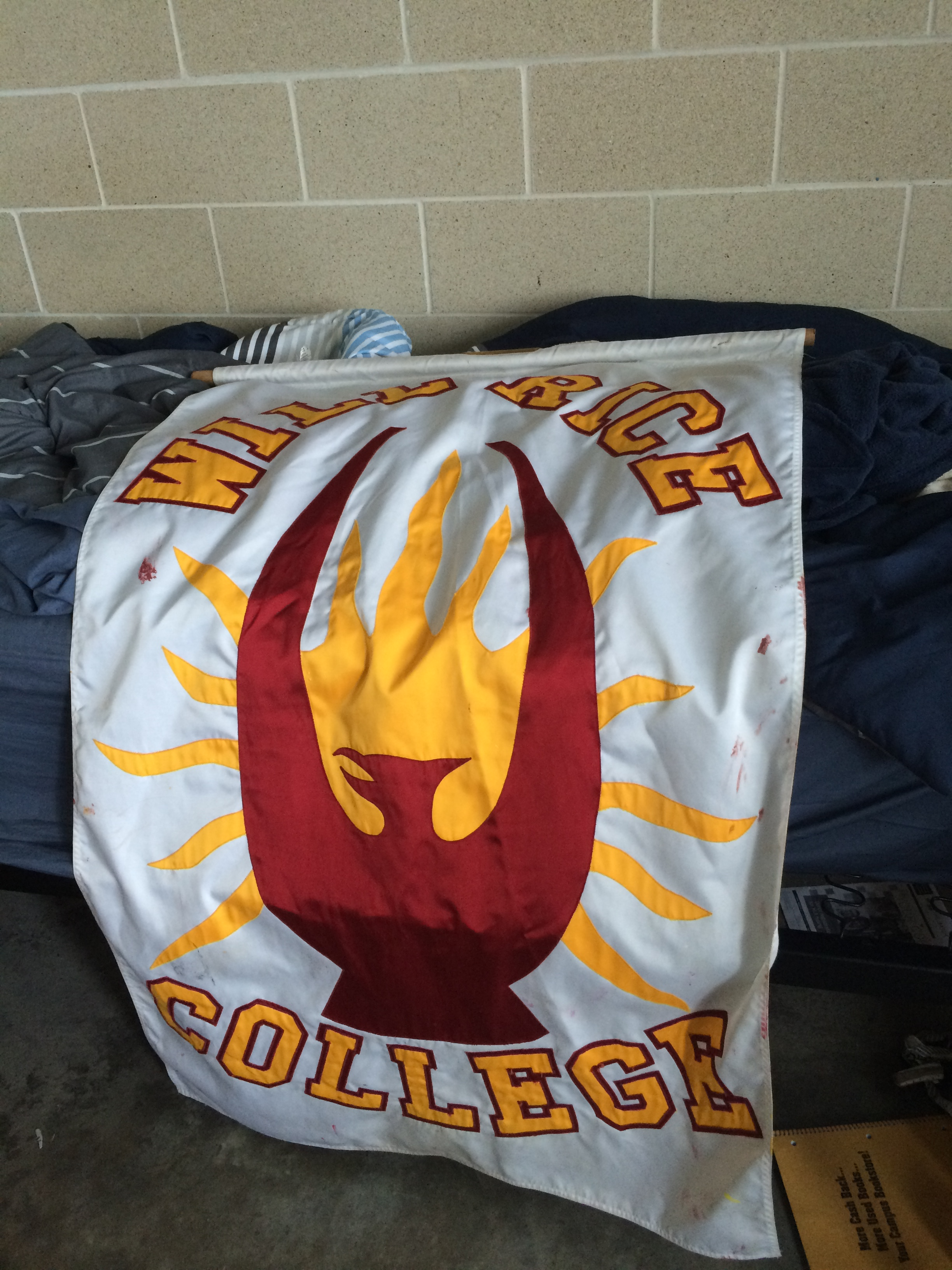
One of Duncan's traditions is stealing Will Rice's flag

Duncan College has also established a Monday night tradition, known as "Monday Night Lights." When a few students went down to play ping-pong one night, they noticed that the ping pong table they had played on actually belonged to Baker College, who took its table back. Instead of going to bed, they made a makeshift table in the quad out of extra tables and using toilet paper as the net. People noticed the table and came down to the quad join in, watch and even play acoustic instruments. Monday Night Lights is now a monthly event. Other traditions include "Duncing" people in the DuncTank outside the commons on their birthdays, temporarily borrowing prized artifacts from other colleges including Will Rice's flag and Jones' trampoline, and a once a semester Nerf Gun capture the flag game throughout the building called Donnybrook.

Architecturally, Duncan has the same features as McMurtry with minor differences emphasized in order to establish its uniqueness. For example, Duncan Commons is rectangular in shape, contrasting the round McMurtry Commons. Also, Duncan quad has different features from McMurtry, such as a fountain by the Commons, smaller trees, and walkways that go across the quad. The interior, however, is virtually the same, as both colleges contain mostly doubles in the hallways and single rooms in the corners, with doubles having a pod bathroom inside and singles sharing common bathrooms. Both also have green roofs and fifth floor doubles and suites that open to the outside. The interior hallways of both Duncan and McMurtry were designed as contrasts to the other two most recently built residential colleges, Martel and Wiess, which have exterior hallways. The pair of McMurtry and Duncan are commonly referred to as McDuncan.

== Chao College ==
Chao College

The Ting Tsung and Wei Fong Chao College is the 12th residential college of Rice University. It opened for the fall semester of 2026. Its construction was funded by a donation from the Chao Family Foundation. It was the first new addition to the residential college system in 17 years. According to Rice University, the dormitory provides nearly 300 on-campus beds. The building was designed by Danish architecture firm Henning Larsen, with Houston-based Kirksey as executive architect, and consists of two residential towers (measuring 5 and 10 stories) linked by a complex of courtyards and terraces.
