= Luis Duno-Gottberg =

Venezuelan academic and professor

- Citizenship: Venezuela; United States
- Occupations: professor; Author
- Known for: Research on Latin American culture
- Title: Lee Hage Jamail Chair in Latin American Studies; Professor of Caribbean & Film Studies
- Awards: Best Paper in the Humanities (Latin American Studies Association, 2010); George R. Brown Award for Superior Teaching (2015, 2017, 2026)

Academic background
- Education: Universidad Central de Venezuela (B.A.); University of Pittsburgh (M.A., PhD, Doctoral Certificate in Cultural Studies)

Academic work
- Discipline: Latin American studies; Caribbean Studies; Film studies; Cultural studies
- Website: https://luisdunogottberg.com/

Luis Duno-Gottberg is a Venezuelan academic and professor at Rice University, where he holds the Lee Hage Jamail Chair in Latin American studies. His research focuses on Caribbean and Latin American culture, visual culture, race, and political violence. Duno-Gottberg has authored and edited works on modern slavery in the Americas, mestizaje in Cuba, and the cultural representations of disasters and incarceration in Latin America.

== Early life and education ==
Duno-Gottberg was born in Venezuela to Estela Gottberg, a neuroscientist, and Pedro Duno, a philosopher. In 1994, he earned a Bachelor of Arts degree in Literature from the Universidad Central de Venezuela, graduating summa cum laude.

He later attended the University of Pittsburgh, where he earned a Master's degree in Latin American Literature in 1996. He also completed a Doctoral Certificate in Cultural Studies. In 2000, he earned his PhD in Latin American Literature at the University of Pittsburgh.

== Career ==
Duno-Gottberg's academic career includes teaching and administrative roles in Venezuela and the United States. He has served as a juror for several literary and professional competitions, including the Latin American Studies Association (LASA) Venezuelan Section Prize (2011), the Rómulo Gallegos International Literary Prize in Venezuela (2013), the José Donoso International Literary Prize in Chile (2022), and the LASA Fernando Coronil Prize for Venezuelan Studies (2022).

He also co-curated the exhibition "La Furia del Viento" at the Fototeca de Cuba, which featured over 120 years of photography documenting earthquakes and hurricanes.

=== 2000–2008 ===
After completing his PhD, Duno-Gottberg returned to Venezuela to join the faculty at Universidad Simón Bolívar. He taught there from 2000 to 2003, where his courses focused on Latin American literature and cultural theory. In 2003, Duno-Gottberg accepted a position at Florida Atlantic University, where he served as Associate professor and Director of Caribbean and Latin American Studies. He also chaired the Comparative literature program before leaving the university in 2008.

=== 2008–present ===
Duno-Gottberg joined Rice University in 2008 and was promoted to full professor in 2019. He served as Department Chair of Spanish, Portuguese, and Latin American Studies from 2016 to 2020. His administrative roles at Rice include serving as the founding Magister of Duncan College (2009–2015) and Magister of Baker College (2017–2023). In 2025, he was appointed the founding Magister of Chao College.

== Notable works ==
=== Books ===
- Albert Camus, Naturaleza: Patria y Exilio
- Solventar las diferencias: La ideología del mestizaje en Cuba (2003)
- La humanidad como mercancía: Introducción a la esclavitud en América y el Caribe (2014)
- El ojo de la serpiente. Fotografía y visualidad del desastre «natural» en cuba (Forthcoming 2027)

=== Fiction ===
- The Complainers Blood. Austin Macauley Publishers Ltd, London (2026)

=== Edited volumes ===
- Carceral Communities: Troubling Prison Worlds in 21st Century Latin America (2021)
- La derecha como autoritarismo en el siglo XXI (2020).
- The Films of Arturo Ripstein: The Sinister Gaze of the World (2019)
- La politica encarnada. Biopolítica y Cultura en la Venezuela Bolivariana (2015)
- Haiti and the Americas (2013)
- Submerged. Sumergido. Alternative Cuban Cinema (2013)
- Miradas al margen. Cine y subalternidad en América Latina (2008)
- Imagen y Subalternidad. El cine de Víctor Gaviria (2003)

=== Articles (Peer Reviewed) ===
- “Lo que dejó la marea: Algunas hipótesis sobre un cine posnacional, desterritorializado y posrentista en Venezuela”, Fantasma Materia. Revista Anual de Cine (N. 2, 2025)
- “The Mythological Machine and The Revolutionary Remains of Hugo Chávez. Reflections on Memorialization and Conservative Returns.” Arizona Journal of Hispanic Cultural Studies. Volume 28, 2024, pp. 243-255
- “Maqui-Naciones Caníbales: Apropiaciones tecnológicas en América Latina / Cannibal Machi-Nations: Technological Appropriations in Latin America”, Accesos. Revista de investigaciones artísticas, Universidad Complutense, 6, pp.90-100, Madrid 2022.
- “Cismas y sismos del latinoamericanismo y la cuestión de la subalternidad: Un homenaje al pensamiento de John Beverley”, A Contracorriente, North Carolina State University. Vol. 19 No. 2 (2022): Winter 2022.
- “¿Precariato revolucionario o las turbas del rey? Nuevos sujetos de la política venezolana y soberanía lumpen (notas para pensar un nuevo pueblo)”, Revista Espacio Abierto, Universidad del Zulia, Venezuela. vol. 31, núm. 2, pp. 121-137, 2022.
- “El cinematógrafo contra el caníbal: Ruido y modernidad en el primer cine sonoro venezolano,” Vivomatografías. Revista de estudios sobre precine y cine silente en Latinoamérica Año 6, n. 6, December 2020.
- “Transaction & Transition. Photographing Change in Contemporary Cuba.” NACLA (North American Congress on Latin America) Report on the Americas, 48.2 (2016): pp. 191-199.
- "Geografías del miedo en el cine venezolano contemporáneo: Soy un delincuente (1976) y Secuestro Express (2005)." Revista Ensayos. Historia y teoría del arte. No. 9 (2011) pp. 40-64.
- “Narrating from the Ruins: Cubagua and La Galera de Tiberio by Enrique Bernardo Núñez.” Journal of Caribbean Literatures, 6.2 (2010): pp. 13-24.
- “Narrativas somáticas y cambio social: Notas para el cuadro venezolano.” Revista Estudios (Special issue on Cuerpos enfermos / Contagios culturales, coordinated by Nathalie Bouzaglo y Javier Guerrero), 17:34 (July-December 2009): pp. 403-437.
- “Social Images of Anti-Apocalypse: Bikers and the Representation of Popular Politics in Venezuela.” A Contracorriente, 6.2 (Winter 2009): pp. 144-172. Available at: http://www.ncsu.edu/project/acontracorriente/D_Gottberg.pdf
- “Huellas de lo Real: Testimonio y cine de la delincuencia en Venezuela y Colombia.” Revista Iberoamericana, LXXIV.223 (2008): pp. 531-555. (Co-authored with Forrest Hylton).
- "El relato de las ruinas: Enrique Bernardo Núñez y su imaginario contra-colonial caribeño." TINKUY (Special issue on Entre las “ruinas” y la descolonización. Reflexiones desde la literatura del Gran Caribe) 13 (June 2010): pp. 77-85.
- Transaction & Transition: Photographing Change in Contemporary Cuba (2016)
- Geografías del miedo en el cine venezolano contemporáneo (2011)

=== Opinion ===
- "Geología de una crisis: las réplicas del temblor", CTXT Revista Contexto, https://ctxt.es/es/20260601/Politica/54010/venezuela-politica-caracas-luis-duno-gottberg.htm
- “Doctrina Donroe. Venezuela después de Maduro”, CTXT Revista Contexto, https://ctxt.es/es/20260601/Firmas/53715/venezuela-nicolas-maduro-delcy-rodriguez-doctrina-donroe-imperialismo-luis-duno-gottberg.htm, 5/06/2026
- “El ídolo dorado de Trump y la ética del monumento¨, ETHIC, Spain, https://ethic.es/idolo-dorado-trump-etica-monumento, 04/26/26
- “Escuchar el acento. Contra las estructuras audibles del poder”, ETHIC, Spain, https://ethic.es/escuchar-acento-contra-estructuras-audibles-poder, 04/03/26.
- “Trump y la transparencia narcisista del poder”, ETHIC, Spain, https://ethic.es/trump-transparencia-narcisista-poder, 02/02/26
- “Intervención militar en Venezuela: las elecciones cuentan, pero el control cuenta más”, El Diario, Spain, 05/01/2026.
- “La mueca autoritaria”, ETHIC, Spain, https://ethic.es/mueca-autoritaria, 01/28/26
- “El Odio como mercancía”, ETHIC, Spain. https://ethic.es/ 01/07/26
- “El hombre Fuerte del resentimiento”, ETHIC, Spain. https://ethic.es/, 12/19/25
- “Pantaleón y la política exterior de Trump con Venezuela”, La Jornada, México, Feb 2025, https://www.jornada.com.mx/noticia/2025/02/15/opinion/pantaleon-y-la-politica-exterior-de-trump-con-venezuela-5630
- “Y nos vamos todos juntos: Migración y resistencia indígena en el contexto de la hegemonía neoliberal”, https://loquierasono.democracia.com.es/textos/migracion-y-resistencia-indigena, 2024.
- “Casas de cartón: cantos de contienda para una modernidad desigual”, https://loquierasono.democracia.com.es/textos/casas-de-carton, , 2024.
- “Tecnologías del odio antinmigrante en la frontera México-EU”, La Jornada, Mexico, 8/18/2023 (With Miguel Tinker-Salas), https://www.jornada.com.mx/2023/08/18/opinion/014a1pol
- “La deshumanización del inmigrante y guerra política en EU”, La Jornada, Mexico, 2023/09/17 (With Miguel Tinker-Salas), https://www.jornada.com.mx/notas/2023/07/20/politica/la-deshumanizacion-del-inmigrante-y-guerra-politica-en-eu/
- “El éxodo Venezolano“, La Jornada, Mexico, december 13, 2022. (With Miguel Tinker-Salas), www.jornada.com.mx/2022/12/13/opinion/018a2pol#.Y5isM48kBHw
- “Katrina y el tercer mundo al norte del Río Bravo,” La Jibarilla at http://www.lajiribilla.cu/2005/n227_09/227_39.html. Also at: Aporrea at http://www.aporrea.org/tiburon/a16599.html (2005).
- “Víctor Gaviria en la tradición del cine latinoamericano,” in Puro Colombia. A Retrospective of Colombian Cinema. Catalog for a film series hosted at Florida Atlantic University and Cinema Paradiso. March 2005.

== Awards and recognitions ==
In 2010, the Venezuelan Studies Section of the LASA awarded Duno-Gottberg the Best Paper in the Humanities award. He received an "Honorary Mention" for best research article from the same organization in 2012. Additionally, he was a recipient of the George R. Brown Award for Superior Teaching at Rice University in 2015, 2017, and 2026.
