= Essays in French Literature and Culture =

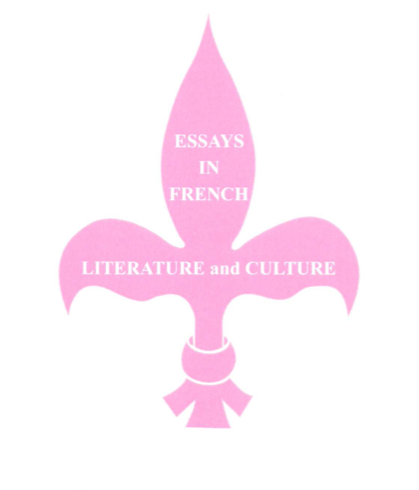
- Discipline: French studies
- Language: French, English
- Edited by: Hélène Jaccomard

Publication details
- Former name: Essays in French Literature
- History: 1964–present
- Publisher: The University of Western Australia
- Frequency: Yearly

Standard abbreviations
- ISO 4: Essays Fr. Lit. Cult.

Indexing
- ISSN: 1835-7040

Links
- Journal homepage

Essays in French Literature and Culture is an annual peer-reviewed academic journal published by the University of Western Australia. It was established in 1964 by James R. Lawler, the Foundation Chair of French Studies at this university. The journal focuses on French Studies, in a broad sense. From its inception, the journal's main aim has been "to draw attention to broader aspects of French literary culture". Since 2022, the journal has. been available both in print and in soft copies, as well as Open Access for free (after a 3 months grace period). and indexed in the Directory of Open Access Journals.

== History ==
The journal was established in 1964 by James R. Lawler. In 1975, the journal's editorship passed on to Denis Boak who, in a commemorative issue celebrating the journal's fiftieth anniversary, argued that Essays in French Literature was a "free-standing intellectual endeavour" providing "an extra outlet for young scholars to publish". He was succeeded by Andrew Hunwick in 1995. Hélène Jaccomard took over in 2007.
A growing interest in cultural studies in the field of French studies led to a widening of the scope of the journal and its renaming in 2008. The new title reflects this wider emphasis on culture.

In the context of the crisis in academic publishing, and as one of only two French Studies academic journals in Australia, Essays in French Literature and Culture has survived due to the quality of the articles it stringently selects, the thorough double-blind evaluation by independent assessors, and its widening readership which is its only financial means of support.

In the first forty years of its existence, the journal published essays spontaneously submitted to the Editors. Since 2007 many issues have been thematic and guest edited by experts in the field.
The journal's standing is acknowledged by the Australian Society of French Studies and Informit database.

== Editorial Board ==
- Prof. Hélène Jaccomard, managing editor, The University of Western Australia
- Associate Professor Bonnie Thomas, associate editor, The University of Western Australia
- Prof. Véronique Duché, University of Melbourne
- Dr Paul Gibbard, The University of Western Australia
- Dr Rosemary Lancaster, The University of Western Australia
- Prof. Louise Hardwick, University of Birmingham
- Prof. Srilata Ravi, University of Alberta
- Dr Jean-Marie Volet, The University of Western Australia.
- Dr Kate Averis, The University of Western Australia.

== Current issue nr 63 (2026) ==
"Poétique, politique et éthique du corps dans l'œuvre de Houellebecq", Guest-edited by Bertrand Bourgeois, Sophie Patrick and Klem James

Bertrand Bourgeois, Klem James, Sophie Patrick, “Introduction: The body in Michel Houellebecq’s works: background and perspectives”
Yusuke Yagi, “Le corps sans miracle et la chair tactile: une lecture des premiers recueils poétiques de Michel Houellebecq”
Xinyi Liu, “Le corps sans âme ou bien le corps de l’âme? Le cas des Particules élémentaires”
Sophie Patrick and Klem James, “The Overcoming of Mind-Body Dualism in the Novels of Michel Houellebecq”
Patrice Vibert, “Les deux sciences des corps dans l’œuvre de Michel Houellebecq”
Silvia Arnoldi, “The Collapse of Agency: Houellebecq’s Neoliberal Ideal Type”
Fabien Siles, “Malaise spatio-corporel dans l’œuvre littéraire de Michel Houellebecq”
Bertrand Bourgeois, “Imaginaire du corps décadent dans Anéantir de Michel Houellebecq”
Non-Thematic
Liu Yang, “Speaking in Silence: Poetic Resilience in Mariama Bâ’s Une si longue lettre”

== Forthcoming Issue ==
- Issue 64 (2027) En scène ! Regards sur le théâtre français et francophone contemporain’/ To the Stage ! Perspectives on Contemporary French and Francophone Theater’ (Open)

== Recent Issues (2008-2026) ==
- issue nr 45: Foreign? Writing in French (2008)
- issue nr 46 : Sports (2009)
- issue nr 47 and 48: Landscape and Memory (2010 and 2011)
- issue nr 49: The Paratext (2012)
- issue nr 50: Playtime (2013)
- issue nr 51: Représenter la Grande Guerre: les écrivains et les artistes face à l’épreuve (1914-1920) (2014)
- issue nr 52: Diaspora, Afropolitanism and Congolese Literature (2015)
- issue nr 53: Conflict, dialogue and representation (2016)
- issue nr 54: Hidden Words, Hidden Worlds (France 1939–1945) (2017)
- issue nr 55 : Miscellaneous (2018).
- issue nr 56 : “Mines de rien”. L’Antillaise et l’Afropéenne face aux tropologies, entre mythes et réalités au fil du temps (2019)
- issue nr 57 : Identité et Environnement (2020)
- issue nr 58 : The Critical French Medical Humanities (2021)
- issue nr 59 : Retranslation revisited/La Retraduction revisitée (2022)
- issue nr 60 : Matters of Taste/Questions de goûts, Edited by Prof.Véronique Duché, A. R. Chisholm Professor of French at the University of Melbourne.(2023)
- issue nr 61: "Pioneering the Field of Francophone Caribbean Literature" A la mémoire de Professeure Beverley Ormerod Noakes, Edited by Professor Srilata Ravi, University of Alberta, and A/Professor Bonnie Thomas, The University of Western Australia. (2024)
- issue nr 62: L’argent romanesque (20 et 21ème siècles)/ Novelistic Money (2025)
- issue nr 63: "Poétique, politique et éthique du corps dans l'œuvre de Houellebecq", Guest-edited by Bertrand Bourgeois, Sophie Patrick and Klem James (2026)

== Abstracting and indexing ==
The journal is abstracted and indexed in the Emerging Sources Citation Index, and EBSCO and ProQuest databases. It is indexed on the Directory of Open Access Journals (DOAJ).
